= List of Jupiter trojans (Greek camp) (600001–700000) =

This is a partial list of Jupiter's L_{4} trojans (60° ahead of Jupiter) with numbers 600001–700000. If available, an object's mean diameter is taken from the NEOWISE data release, which the Small-Body Database has also adopted. Mean diameters are rounded to two significant figures if smaller than 100 kilometers. Estimates are in italics and calculated from a magnitude-to-diameter conversion, using an assumed albedo of 0.057.

== 600001–700000 ==
This list contains 1058 objects sorted in numerical order.

Designation	Discovery			Orbital description					Diam.	Remarks	Refs
Designation	Date	Observer	Site	a (AU)	e	i (°)	q (AU)	Q (AU)	Diam.	Remarks	Refs
(600435) 2011 WL_{65}	25 November 2011	Pan-STARRS	Haleakala	5.225	0.086	23.9	4.773	5.676	9.6 km	–	catalog · MPC · JPL
(600437) 2011 WG_{69}	13 October 2010	Mount Lemmon Survey	Mount Lemmon	5.129	0.038	6.3	4.934	5.325	8.1 km	–	catalog · MPC · JPL
(600457) 2011 WT_{157}	17 January 2013	Pan-STARRS	Haleakala	5.202	0.012	3.3	5.137	5.266	7.4 km	–	catalog · MPC · JPL
(600463) 2011 WD_{174}	28 November 2011	Mount Lemmon Survey	Mount Lemmon	5.295	0.030	22.1	5.134	5.456	8.9 km	–	catalog · MPC · JPL
(600466) 2011 WQ_{176}	26 November 2011	Mount Lemmon Survey	Mount Lemmon	5.275	0.094	11.1	4.780	5.770	7.8 km	–	catalog · MPC · JPL
(600484) 2011 YT_{33}	26 December 2011	Spacewatch	Kitt Peak	5.289	0.066	12.9	4.942	5.637	7.9 km	–	catalog · MPC · JPL
(600486) 2011 YF_{39}	1 April 2003	SDSS Collaboration	Apache Point	5.266	0.081	17.0	4.839	5.693	7.9 km	–	catalog · MPC · JPL
(600492) 2011 YM_{56}	1 October 2008	Mount Lemmon Survey	Mount Lemmon	5.177	0.050	6.4	4.917	5.437	6.6 km	–	catalog · MPC · JPL
(600496) 2011 YN_{73}	13 November 2010	Mount Lemmon Survey	Mount Lemmon	5.220	0.115	13.4	4.619	5.822	6.9 km	–	catalog · MPC · JPL
(600506) 2011 YW_{89}	31 December 2011	Mount Lemmon Survey	Mount Lemmon	5.291	0.065	17.2	4.946	5.635	7.7 km	–	catalog · MPC · JPL
(600507) 2011 YE_{91}	29 December 2011	Mount Lemmon Survey	Mount Lemmon	5.229	0.064	10.3	4.895	5.564	6.7 km	–	catalog · MPC · JPL
(600508) 2011 YG_{93}	27 December 2011	Spacewatch	Kitt Peak	5.276	0.101	21.5	4.742	5.811	7.2 km	–	catalog · MPC · JPL
(600515) 2012 AK_{18}	28 December 2011	Mount Lemmon Survey	Mount Lemmon	5.223	0.029	30.3	5.073	5.373	7.7 km	–	catalog · MPC · JPL
(600518) 2012 AG_{23}	2 January 2012	Mount Lemmon Survey	Mount Lemmon	5.153	0.073	16.4	4.778	5.528	8.5 km	–	catalog · MPC · JPL
(600526) 2012 AH_{31}	1 January 2012	Mount Lemmon Survey	Mount Lemmon	5.180	0.046	3.3	4.944	5.417	6.1 km	–	catalog · MPC · JPL
(600527) 2012 AP_{33}	2 January 2012	Mount Lemmon Survey	Mount Lemmon	5.263	0.073	19.6	4.878	5.647	7.4 km	–	catalog · MPC · JPL
(600548) 2012 BJ_{60}	26 October 2009	Mount Lemmon Survey	Mount Lemmon	5.254	0.100	15.1	4.731	5.777	9.8 km	–	catalog · MPC · JPL
(600549) 2012 BT_{60}	24 January 2012	Pan-STARRS	Haleakala	5.264	0.106	18.9	4.705	5.823	7.1 km	–	catalog · MPC · JPL
(600551) 2012 BO_{64}	20 January 2012	Mount Lemmon Survey	Mount Lemmon	5.259	0.032	4.8	5.093	5.425	7.2 km	–	catalog · MPC · JPL
(600556) 2012 BB_{79}	18 December 2011	ESA OGS	ESA OGS	5.213	0.116	22.2	4.610	5.816	8.8 km	–	catalog · MPC · JPL
(600558) 2012 BQ_{96}	29 December 2011	Mount Lemmon Survey	Mount Lemmon	5.187	0.072	24.2	4.814	5.559	7.4 km	–	catalog · MPC · JPL
(600564) 2012 BC_{123}	21 January 2012	Spacewatch	Kitt Peak	5.192	0.065	16.4	4.854	5.530	7.4 km	–	catalog · MPC · JPL
(600579) 2012 BD_{155}	3 November 2010	Spacewatch	Kitt Peak	5.296	0.077	8.3	4.889	5.702	7.2 km	–	catalog · MPC · JPL
(600598) 2012 BS_{173}	6 October 2008	Mount Lemmon Survey	Mount Lemmon	5.268	0.052	8.5	4.995	5.541	6.4 km	–	catalog · MPC · JPL
(600605) 2012 BO_{180}	18 January 2012	Mount Lemmon Survey	Mount Lemmon	5.275	0.059	22.6	4.962	5.589	7.0 km	–	catalog · MPC · JPL
(600610) 2012 CF_{18}	24 September 2008	Spacewatch	Kitt Peak	5.303	0.106	4.7	4.744	5.863	6.0 km	–	catalog · MPC · JPL
601227 Ammann	18 December 2012	M. Ory	Oukaïmeden	5.226	0.097	8.2	4.720	5.731	6.8 km	–	catalog · MPC · JPL
(601244) 2013 AL_{23}	5 January 2013	Mount Lemmon Survey	Mount Lemmon	5.172	0.048	19.9	4.923	5.420	9.6 km	–	catalog · MPC · JPL
(601246) 2013 AX_{49}	22 December 2012	Pan-STARRS	Haleakala	5.141	0.038	12.8	4.944	5.337	7.3 km	–	catalog · MPC · JPL
(601253) 2013 AA_{70}	31 August 2007	K. Sárneczky; L. Kiss	Siding Spring	5.169	0.027	17.5	5.031	5.307	11 km	–	catalog · MPC · JPL
(601254) 2013 AQ_{70}	1 May 2004	Spacewatch	Kitt Peak	5.291	0.046	16.0	5.047	5.534	7.9 km	–	catalog · MPC · JPL
(601255) 2013 AC_{71}	10 January 2013	Pan-STARRS	Haleakala	5.135	0.063	18.6	4.814	5.456	11 km	–	catalog · MPC · JPL
(601271) 2013 AD_{129}	10 January 2013	Pan-STARRS	Haleakala	5.204	0.085	21.2	4.761	5.647	9.1 km	–	catalog · MPC · JPL
(601272) 2013 AT_{129}	10 January 2013	Pan-STARRS	Haleakala	5.252	0.029	22.5	5.098	5.407	9.8 km	–	catalog · MPC · JPL
(601274) 2013 AT_{135}	10 January 2013	Pan-STARRS	Haleakala	5.151	0.013	7.4	5.081	5.220	6.7 km	–	catalog · MPC · JPL
(601275) 2013 AV_{135}	10 January 2013	Pan-STARRS	Haleakala	5.294	0.048	8.4	5.041	5.547	8.9 km	–	catalog · MPC · JPL
(601282) 2013 AW_{167}	17 October 2010	Mount Lemmon Survey	Mount Lemmon	5.255	0.035	9.8	5.071	5.439	6.6 km	–	catalog · MPC · JPL
(601285) 2013 AX_{183}	10 January 2013	Pan-STARRS	Haleakala	5.273	0.014	7.7	5.200	5.346	8.3 km	–	catalog · MPC · JPL
(601292) 2013 AS_{194}	10 January 2013	Spacewatch	Kitt Peak	5.207	0.059	33.1	4.902	5.512	9.2 km	–	catalog · MPC · JPL
(601293) 2013 AW_{194}	5 January 2013	Spacewatch	Kitt Peak	5.224	0.084	32.8	4.783	5.665	7.3 km	–	catalog · MPC · JPL
(601294) 2013 AD_{195}	10 January 2013	Pan-STARRS	Haleakala	5.170	0.062	29.5	4.850	5.490	6.5 km	–	catalog · MPC · JPL
(601297) 2013 AB_{199}	5 January 2013	Spacewatch	Kitt Peak	5.136	0.061	5.1	4.821	5.450	6.6 km	–	catalog · MPC · JPL
(601298) 2013 AY_{199}	10 January 2013	Pan-STARRS	Haleakala	5.191	0.059	9.7	4.885	5.497	6.1 km	–	catalog · MPC · JPL
(601299) 2013 AD_{200}	9 January 2013	Spacewatch	Kitt Peak	5.231	0.055	10.0	4.942	5.519	6.9 km	–	catalog · MPC · JPL
(601300) 2013 AU_{201}	10 January 2013	Pan-STARRS	Haleakala	5.104	0.085	9.2	4.668	5.540	6.1 km	–	catalog · MPC · JPL
(601301) 2013 BD	28 September 2009	Mount Lemmon Survey	Mount Lemmon	5.214	0.024	8.4	5.090	5.338	6.8 km	–	catalog · MPC · JPL
(601302) 2013 BF	27 February 2015	Pan-STARRS	Haleakala	5.179	0.030	6.7	5.022	5.337	5.7 km	–	catalog · MPC · JPL
(601304) 2013 BU	11 October 2010	Mount Lemmon Survey	Mount Lemmon	5.135	0.048	6.7	4.890	5.379	6.7 km	–	catalog · MPC · JPL
(601305) 2013 BQ_{1}	8 December 2012	Spacewatch	Kitt Peak	5.292	0.134	6.9	4.582	6.001	7.1 km	–	catalog · MPC · JPL
(601306) 2013 BR_{1}	23 December 2012	Pan-STARRS	Haleakala	5.160	0.074	8.1	4.779	5.541	5.9 km	–	catalog · MPC · JPL
(601311) 2013 BA_{17}	14 May 2005	Spacewatch	Kitt Peak	5.257	0.047	32.0	5.009	5.506	14 km	–	catalog · MPC · JPL
(601312) 2013 BF_{17}	16 January 2013	Mount Lemmon Survey	Mount Lemmon	5.203	0.053	14.0	4.925	5.481	6.6 km	–	catalog · MPC · JPL
(601314) 2013 BU_{33}	17 January 2013	Pan-STARRS	Haleakala	5.166	0.035	10.3	4.985	5.348	7.7 km	–	catalog · MPC · JPL
(601317) 2013 BV_{41}	10 January 2013	Pan-STARRS	Haleakala	5.106	0.110	8.5	4.543	5.668	6.9 km	–	catalog · MPC · JPL
(601318) 2013 BU_{42}	18 January 2013	Mount Lemmon Survey	Mount Lemmon	5.198	0.054	12.1	4.918	5.478	9.0 km	–	catalog · MPC · JPL
(601321) 2013 BM_{51}	16 January 2013	Pan-STARRS	Haleakala	5.221	0.054	6.8	4.938	5.505	6.3 km	–	catalog · MPC · JPL
(601323) 2013 BC_{58}	5 January 2013	Mount Lemmon Survey	Mount Lemmon	5.188	0.098	4.6	4.681	5.694	6.1 km	–	catalog · MPC · JPL
(601325) 2013 BW_{74}	17 January 2013	Pan-STARRS	Haleakala	5.243	0.029	31.4	5.090	5.396	10 km	–	catalog · MPC · JPL
(601329) 2013 BP_{82}	18 September 2009	Spacewatch	Kitt Peak	5.229	0.052	10.9	4.954	5.503	5.9 km	–	catalog · MPC · JPL
(601340) 2013 BX_{93}	18 January 2013	Spacewatch	Kitt Peak	5.216	0.052	21.4	4.948	5.485	8.5 km	–	catalog · MPC · JPL
(601341) 2013 BP_{94}	22 January 2013	Mount Lemmon Survey	Mount Lemmon	5.154	0.038	24.3	4.956	5.352	7.6 km	–	catalog · MPC · JPL
(601347) 2013 CH_{13}	11 September 2007	Mount Lemmon Survey	Mount Lemmon	5.204	0.028	22.3	5.056	5.351	11 km	–	catalog · MPC · JPL
(601351) 2013 CL_{26}	3 February 2013	Pan-STARRS	Haleakala	5.160	0.117	11.2	4.558	5.762	7.4 km	–	catalog · MPC · JPL
(601352) 2013 CX_{28}	6 January 2013	Spacewatch	Kitt Peak	5.228	0.125	15.8	4.572	5.884	7.5 km	–	catalog · MPC · JPL
(601360) 2013 CA_{51}	10 January 2013	Pan-STARRS	Haleakala	5.164	0.064	10.0	4.832	5.497	7.6 km	–	catalog · MPC · JPL
(601376) 2013 CV_{97}	26 December 2011	Spacewatch	Kitt Peak	5.287	0.087	10.1	4.829	5.744	7.9 km	–	catalog · MPC · JPL
(601377) 2013 CF_{107}	9 February 2013	Pan-STARRS	Haleakala	5.237	0.071	13.6	4.865	5.608	6.4 km	–	catalog · MPC · JPL
(601392) 2013 CU_{152}	27 December 2011	Spacewatch	Kitt Peak	5.246	0.122	11.8	4.606	5.886	6.6 km	–	catalog · MPC · JPL
(601394) 2013 CN_{157}	10 October 2008	Mount Lemmon Survey	Mount Lemmon	5.227	0.083	7.8	4.793	5.661	6.6 km	–	catalog · MPC · JPL
(601397) 2013 CX_{167}	3 February 2013	Pan-STARRS	Haleakala	5.221	0.050	9.4	4.958	5.485	6.3 km	–	catalog · MPC · JPL
(601403) 2013 CW_{176}	19 September 2009	Spacewatch	Kitt Peak	5.274	0.105	8.1	4.719	5.828	7.8 km	–	catalog · MPC · JPL
(601408) 2013 CS_{194}	23 September 2008	Mount Lemmon Survey	Mount Lemmon	5.184	0.048	6.8	4.934	5.434	7.1 km	–	catalog · MPC · JPL
(601410) 2013 CP_{196}	10 December 2010	Mount Lemmon Survey	Mount Lemmon	5.162	0.136	8.4	4.459	5.866	6.5 km	–	catalog · MPC · JPL
(601411) 2013 CY_{197}	29 December 2011	Mount Lemmon Survey	Mount Lemmon	5.303	0.028	20.3	5.157	5.449	8.6 km	–	catalog · MPC · JPL
(601416) 2013 CB_{204}	19 January 2013	Spacewatch	Kitt Peak	5.242	0.138	21.3	4.517	5.966	6.9 km	–	catalog · MPC · JPL
(601424) 2013 CK_{223}	5 June 2016	Pan-STARRS	Haleakala	5.210	0.107	10.9	4.654	5.767	5.5 km	–	catalog · MPC · JPL
(601425) 2013 CO_{223}	10 November 2010	Mount Lemmon Survey	Mount Lemmon	5.336	0.065	11.4	4.990	5.683	7.0 km	–	catalog · MPC · JPL
(601433) 2013 CX_{235}	2 April 2016	Pan-STARRS	Haleakala	5.307	0.034	30.3	5.124	5.489	9.1 km	–	catalog · MPC · JPL
(601434) 2013 CF_{236}	3 April 2016	Pan-STARRS	Haleakala	5.102	0.024	11.7	4.980	5.223	6.6 km	–	catalog · MPC · JPL
(601436) 2013 CS_{237}	11 May 2016	Mount Lemmon Survey	Mount Lemmon	5.242	0.040	15.6	5.030	5.454	6.8 km	–	catalog · MPC · JPL
(601438) 2013 CG_{239}	14 February 2013	Mount Lemmon Survey	Mount Lemmon	5.197	0.079	14.9	4.785	5.608	6.9 km	–	catalog · MPC · JPL
(601441) 2013 CK_{243}	5 February 2013	Spacewatch	Kitt Peak	5.237	0.042	13.9	5.019	5.455	7.0 km	–	catalog · MPC · JPL
(601442) 2013 CM_{244}	3 February 2013	Pan-STARRS	Haleakala	5.200	0.114	10.1	4.608	5.793	7.3 km	–	catalog · MPC · JPL
(601443) 2013 CR_{244}	9 February 2013	Pan-STARRS	Haleakala	5.251	0.053	10.1	4.970	5.531	6.7 km	–	catalog · MPC · JPL
(601446) 2013 CA_{248}	15 February 2013	Pan-STARRS	Haleakala	5.192	0.065	8.2	4.856	5.527	6.1 km	–	catalog · MPC · JPL
(601454) 2013 DT_{21}	16 February 2013	Mount Lemmon Survey	Mount Lemmon	5.283	0.023	15.4	5.163	5.403	7.5 km	–	catalog · MPC · JPL
(601499) 2013 EZ_{145}	28 September 2009	Mount Lemmon Survey	Mount Lemmon	5.227	0.139	10.1	4.499	5.955	6.0 km	–	catalog · MPC · JPL
(601514) 2013 FM_{1}	4 September 2008	Spacewatch	Kitt Peak	5.297	0.086	16.1	4.841	5.753	8.6 km	–	catalog · MPC · JPL
(602088) 2014 DB_{50}	10 January 2013	Pan-STARRS	Haleakala	5.223	0.097	13.7	4.719	5.728	9.7 km	–	catalog · MPC · JPL
(602090) 2014 DJ_{50}	6 January 2013	Spacewatch	Kitt Peak	5.159	0.119	5.1	4.543	5.775	6.0 km	–	catalog · MPC · JPL
(602092) 2014 DZ_{53}	8 February 2013	Pan-STARRS	Haleakala	5.229	0.026	3.9	5.094	5.365	6.6 km	–	catalog · MPC · JPL
(602113) 2014 DN_{83}	10 January 2013	Pan-STARRS	Haleakala	5.189	0.074	11.0	4.803	5.575	7.2 km	–	catalog · MPC · JPL
(602133) 2014 DC_{119}	26 September 2009	Spacewatch	Kitt Peak	5.062	0.073	9.2	4.695	5.430	7.1 km	–	catalog · MPC · JPL
(602134) 2014 DN_{119}	25 September 2008	Mount Lemmon Survey	Mount Lemmon	5.306	0.058	9.6	4.997	5.615	7.4 km	–	catalog · MPC · JPL
(602136) 2014 DP_{122}	13 February 2002	Spacewatch	Kitt Peak	5.240	0.040	9.6	5.032	5.448	6.9 km	–	catalog · MPC · JPL
(602145) 2014 DM_{135}	2 February 2013	Mount Lemmon Survey	Mount Lemmon	5.222	0.122	5.8	4.586	5.857	6.5 km	–	catalog · MPC · JPL
(602194) 2014 EW_{31}	25 December 2010	Mount Lemmon Survey	Mount Lemmon	5.193	0.046	8.4	4.956	5.430	8.4 km	–	catalog · MPC · JPL
(602210) 2014 EZ_{58}	20 September 2008	Mount Lemmon Survey	Mount Lemmon	5.145	0.020	6.4	5.041	5.250	6.9 km	–	catalog · MPC · JPL
(602211) 2014 EJ_{65}	6 September 2008	Spacewatch	Kitt Peak	5.274	0.064	7.5	4.939	5.610	7.4 km	–	catalog · MPC · JPL
(602215) 2014 EL_{94}	3 September 2008	Spacewatch	Kitt Peak	5.144	0.049	7.2	4.895	5.394	7.1 km	–	catalog · MPC · JPL
(602219) 2014 EX_{101}	5 September 2010	Mount Lemmon Survey	Mount Lemmon	5.148	0.074	6.5	4.765	5.531	5.6 km	–	catalog · MPC · JPL
(602224) 2014 EH_{117}	5 January 2013	Spacewatch	Kitt Peak	5.243	0.028	21.6	5.098	5.388	7.5 km	–	catalog · MPC · JPL
(602227) 2014 EL_{120}	23 June 2017	Pan-STARRS	Haleakala	5.220	0.078	13.6	4.814	5.627	6.1 km	–	catalog · MPC · JPL
(602232) 2014 EA_{129}	15 November 2010	Spacewatch	Kitt Peak	5.245	0.067	8.7	4.894	5.596	10 km	–	catalog · MPC · JPL
(602238) 2014 EC_{182}	5 September 2008	Spacewatch	Kitt Peak	5.250	0.051	11.5	4.983	5.518	8.4 km	–	catalog · MPC · JPL
(602239) 2014 EG_{188}	24 August 2008	Spacewatch	Kitt Peak	5.146	0.011	5.9	5.091	5.201	7.3 km	–	catalog · MPC · JPL
(602247) 2014 EJ_{224}	5 September 2007	Mount Lemmon Survey	Mount Lemmon	5.279	0.027	13.8	5.137	5.421	8.8 km	–	catalog · MPC · JPL
(602250) 2014 EH_{234}	5 September 2008	Spacewatch	Kitt Peak	5.277	0.087	16.3	4.818	5.736	6.4 km	–	catalog · MPC · JPL
(602254) 2014 EO_{247}	28 December 2011	Mount Lemmon Survey	Mount Lemmon	5.271	0.069	17.3	4.908	5.635	7.6 km	–	catalog · MPC · JPL
(602258) 2014 ER_{254}	6 March 2014	Mount Lemmon Survey	Mount Lemmon	5.102	0.003	7.8	5.087	5.117	7.0 km	–	catalog · MPC · JPL
(602261) 2014 FE_{2}	1 April 2003	SDSS Collaboration	Apache Point	5.226	0.044	16.0	4.997	5.454	6.6 km	–	catalog · MPC · JPL
(602263) 2014 FJ_{4}	16 October 2010	R. Holmes	Charleston	5.203	0.125	9.0	4.553	5.854	8.4 km	–	catalog · MPC · JPL
(602283) 2014 FG_{38}	22 November 2011	Mount Lemmon Survey	Mount Lemmon	5.157	0.098	22.3	4.653	5.661	7.9 km	–	catalog · MPC · JPL
(602321) 2014 GH_{48}	8 March 2014	Mount Lemmon Survey	Mount Lemmon	5.253	0.030	12.0	5.094	5.411	7.5 km	–	catalog · MPC · JPL
(602323) 2014 GO_{53}	12 November 2010	Mount Lemmon Survey	Mount Lemmon	5.200	0.123	13.6	4.560	5.840	7.6 km	–	catalog · MPC · JPL
(602363) 2014 HG_{147}	29 September 2008	Mount Lemmon Survey	Mount Lemmon	5.213	0.081	10.6	4.790	5.636	9.1 km	–	catalog · MPC · JPL
(603370) 2015 BG_{590}	30 January 2015	Pan-STARRS	Haleakala	5.102	0.066	13.0	4.765	5.440	7.4 km	–	catalog · MPC · JPL
(603372) 2015 BE_{597}	28 January 2015	Pan-STARRS	Haleakala	5.161	0.071	9.4	4.794	5.529	6.0 km	–	catalog · MPC · JPL
(603375) 2015 BE_{608}	28 January 2015	Pan-STARRS	Haleakala	5.092	0.055	12.5	4.810	5.375	6.7 km	–	catalog · MPC · JPL
(603491) 2015 DP_{166}	10 April 2005	Kitt Peak Obs.	Kitt Peak	5.149	0.039	9.7	4.946	5.352	8.2 km	–	catalog · MPC · JPL
(603516) 2015 DZ_{224}	17 February 2015	Pan-STARRS	Haleakala	5.208	0.029	28.5	5.059	5.358	8.9 km	–	catalog · MPC · JPL
(603580) 2015 FE_{70}	29 December 2011	Mount Lemmon Survey	Mount Lemmon	5.288	0.090	27.5	4.811	5.764	8.6 km	–	catalog · MPC · JPL
(603584) 2015 FJ_{74}	2 October 2008	Mount Lemmon Survey	Mount Lemmon	5.155	0.004	8.0	5.137	5.173	7.8 km	–	catalog · MPC · JPL
(603588) 2015 FD_{78}	28 December 2011	Mount Lemmon Survey	Mount Lemmon	5.258	0.065	9.1	4.916	5.599	7.5 km	–	catalog · MPC · JPL
(603617) 2015 FJ_{139}	22 October 2009	Mount Lemmon Survey	Mount Lemmon	5.275	0.002	8.3	5.265	5.284	6.9 km	–	catalog · MPC · JPL
(603620) 2015 FS_{146}	10 January 2013	Pan-STARRS	Haleakala	5.274	0.020	9.9	5.167	5.381	7.6 km	–	catalog · MPC · JPL
(603628) 2015 FW_{155}	21 March 2015	Pan-STARRS	Haleakala	5.272	0.036	5.3	5.080	5.464	7.2 km	–	catalog · MPC · JPL
(603629) 2015 FZ_{155}	11 November 2010	Mount Lemmon Survey	Mount Lemmon	5.221	0.055	6.9	4.935	5.506	6.8 km	–	catalog · MPC · JPL
(603631) 2015 FM_{162}	1 December 2010	Mount Lemmon Survey	Mount Lemmon	5.171	0.042	8.6	4.953	5.388	7.9 km	–	catalog · MPC · JPL
(603635) 2015 FH_{167}	25 April 2004	Spacewatch	Kitt Peak	5.216	0.154	23.0	4.412	6.020	6.9 km	–	catalog · MPC · JPL
(603636) 2015 FP_{169}	10 January 2013	Pan-STARRS	Haleakala	5.281	0.025	2.9	5.149	5.413	6.5 km	–	catalog · MPC · JPL
(603663) 2015 FS_{217}	25 September 2009	Spacewatch	Kitt Peak	5.143	0.062	7.8	4.824	5.461	6.3 km	–	catalog · MPC · JPL
(603709) 2015 FQ_{305}	30 November 2011	Mount Lemmon Survey	Mount Lemmon	5.102	0.013	8.2	5.034	5.171	7.1 km	–	catalog · MPC · JPL
(603740) 2015 FN_{347}	18 January 2013	Pan-STARRS	Haleakala	5.308	0.025	26.5	5.177	5.438	8.8 km	–	catalog · MPC · JPL
(603742) 2015 FJ_{349}	31 March 2003	SDSS Collaboration	Apache Point	5.299	0.080	21.3	4.873	5.725	8.6 km	–	catalog · MPC · JPL
(603743) 2015 FF_{354}	29 December 2011	Mount Lemmon Survey	Mount Lemmon	5.278	0.034	7.8	5.098	5.459	7.3 km	–	catalog · MPC · JPL
(603745) 2015 FM_{356}	14 October 2009	Mount Lemmon Survey	Mount Lemmon	5.158	0.059	6.1	4.853	5.462	7.4 km	–	catalog · MPC · JPL
(603747) 2015 FQ_{357}	6 October 2008	Mount Lemmon Survey	Mount Lemmon	5.184	0.015	8.0	5.105	5.262	7.1 km	–	catalog · MPC · JPL
(603763) 2015 FK_{386}	29 October 2010	Mount Lemmon Survey	Mount Lemmon	5.228	0.089	11.3	4.764	5.691	8.3 km	–	catalog · MPC · JPL
(603765) 2015 FP_{392}	15 October 2009	Mount Lemmon Survey	Mount Lemmon	5.177	0.083	10.4	4.749	5.605	8.4 km	–	catalog · MPC · JPL
(603767) 2015 FP_{393}	24 March 2015	Pan-STARRS	Haleakala	5.274	0.027	22.0	5.131	5.417	6.8 km	–	catalog · MPC · JPL
(603768) 2015 FQ_{393}	17 October 2009	Mount Lemmon Survey	Mount Lemmon	5.257	0.026	20.0	5.119	5.395	8.1 km	–	catalog · MPC · JPL
(603787) 2015 FU_{423}	29 March 2015	Pan-STARRS	Haleakala	5.174	0.026	17.1	5.042	5.307	7.7 km	–	catalog · MPC · JPL
(603819) 2015 GW_{30}	20 January 2013	Spacewatch	Kitt Peak	5.221	0.033	3.3	5.047	5.395	7.3 km	–	catalog · MPC · JPL
(603828) 2015 GE_{47}	13 February 2002	SDSS Collaboration	Apache Point	5.157	0.043	13.6	4.937	5.378	7.9 km	–	catalog · MPC · JPL
(603835) 2015 GT_{63}	14 April 2015	Mount Lemmon Survey	Mount Lemmon	5.253	0.029	7.7	5.103	5.403	6.4 km	–	catalog · MPC · JPL
(603836) 2015 GA_{65}	13 April 2015	Pan-STARRS	Haleakala	5.207	0.053	22.1	4.929	5.484	8.2 km	–	catalog · MPC · JPL
(603843) 2015 HF_{17}	2 November 2010	Mount Lemmon Survey	Mount Lemmon	5.107	0.076	3.8	4.719	5.495	6.6 km	–	catalog · MPC · JPL
(603868) 2015 HJ_{47}	28 September 2009	Mount Lemmon Survey	Mount Lemmon	5.184	0.045	7.6	4.949	5.418	7.8 km	–	catalog · MPC · JPL
(603925) 2015 HV_{122}	22 October 2009	Mount Lemmon Survey	Mount Lemmon	5.241	0.073	9.1	4.858	5.623	7.0 km	–	catalog · MPC · JPL
(603928) 2015 HG_{126}	4 January 2012	Mount Lemmon Survey	Mount Lemmon	5.148	0.030	3.9	4.994	5.301	6.2 km	–	catalog · MPC · JPL
(604173) 2015 MS_{23}	2 January 2012	Mount Lemmon Survey	Mount Lemmon	5.241	0.059	6.1	4.934	5.548	7.3 km	–	catalog · MPC · JPL
(605359) 2016 GU_{175}	13 November 2010	Mount Lemmon Survey	Mount Lemmon	5.161	0.049	8.6	4.910	5.412	7.3 km	–	catalog · MPC · JPL
(605418) 2016 HR_{31}	30 April 2016	Pan-STARRS	Haleakala	5.270	0.042	8.0	5.050	5.490	6.1 km	–	catalog · MPC · JPL
(605441) 2016 LY_{4}	13 May 2004	Spacewatch	Kitt Peak	5.249	0.032	23.9	5.083	5.415	9.9 km	–	catalog · MPC · JPL
(605444) 2016 LY_{20}	2 November 2010	Spacewatch	Kitt Peak	5.143	0.039	14.1	4.941	5.346	7.1 km	–	catalog · MPC · JPL
(606621) 2018 LT_{22}	20 September 2009	Mount Lemmon Survey	Mount Lemmon	5.216	0.021	7.8	5.106	5.326	6.2 km	–	catalog · MPC · JPL
(606630) 2018 MA_{18}	16 June 2018	Pan-STARRS	Haleakala	5.232	0.083	15.5	4.796	5.668	6.5 km	–	catalog · MPC · JPL
(606642) 2018 NU_{37}	10 July 2018	Pan-STARRS	Haleakala	5.233	0.078	9.3	4.825	5.641	6.4 km	–	catalog · MPC · JPL
(606917) 2019 MJ_{12}	30 June 2019	Pan-STARRS	Haleakala	5.185	0.172	11.9	4.292	6.079	6.3 km	–	catalog · MPC · JPL
(606918) 2019 MF_{15}	23 February 2015	Pan-STARRS	Haleakala	5.221	0.086	20.2	4.770	5.671	7.0 km	–	catalog · MPC · JPL
(606923) 2019 NC_{10}	10 January 2013	Pan-STARRS	Haleakala	5.293	0.037	7.9	5.098	5.487	5.9 km	–	catalog · MPC · JPL
(606927) 2019 NJ_{38}	4 July 2019	Pan-STARRS	Haleakala	5.292	0.064	7.0	4.954	5.631	6.0 km	–	catalog · MPC · JPL
(606929) 2019 OZ_{6}	28 February 2014	Pan-STARRS	Haleakala	5.196	0.047	8.9	4.954	5.438	6.3 km	–	catalog · MPC · JPL
(606933) 2019 PC_{37}	21 March 2015	Pan-STARRS	Haleakala	5.224	0.095	22.0	4.730	5.718	8.2 km	–	catalog · MPC · JPL
(606936) 2019 RL_{57}	18 June 2018	Pan-STARRS	Haleakala	5.274	0.032	6.2	5.107	5.441	6.1 km	–	catalog · MPC · JPL
(606987) 2020 PM_{55}	29 October 2010	Mount Lemmon Survey	Mount Lemmon	5.103	0.056	11.9	4.818	5.389	6.7 km	–	catalog · MPC · JPL
(606989) 2020 RV_{41}	5 September 2008	Spacewatch	Kitt Peak	5.129	0.062	6.4	4.812	5.445	6.6 km	–	catalog · MPC · JPL
(606990) 2020 RF_{98}	29 September 2009	Mount Lemmon Survey	Mount Lemmon	5.190	0.095	9.0	4.699	5.680	6.3 km	–	catalog · MPC · JPL
(606993) 2020 SU_{68}	13 December 2010	Mount Lemmon Survey	Mount Lemmon	5.127	0.050	10.4	4.871	5.383	7.0 km	–	catalog · MPC · JPL
(607225) 1999 XU_{265}	5 February 2013	Spacewatch	Kitt Peak	5.186	0.025	7.5	5.056	5.316	7.8 km	–	catalog · MPC · JPL
(607653) 2002 CD_{326}	8 February 2002	R. Millis; M. W. Buie	Kitt Peak	5.204	0.064	3.0	4.870	5.539	6.3 km	–	catalog · MPC · JPL
(607654) 2002 CS_{326}	15 September 2007	Mount Lemmon Survey	Mount Lemmon	5.193	0.138	18.8	4.475	5.910	5.8 km	–	catalog · MPC · JPL
(607657) 2002 CD_{328}	21 January 2015	Pan-STARRS	Haleakala	5.204	0.061	16.5	4.889	5.519	7.4 km	–	catalog · MPC · JPL
(607668) 2002 EN_{157}	5 April 2003	Spacewatch	Kitt Peak	5.142	0.077	7.6	4.745	5.539	7.1 km	–	catalog · MPC · JPL
(607687) 2002 FA_{42}	9 March 2002	Spacewatch	Kitt Peak	5.121	0.084	6.4	4.691	5.550	7.2 km	–	catalog · MPC · JPL
(607689) 2002 FE_{44}	10 January 2013	Pan-STARRS	Haleakala	5.201	0.040	6.2	4.992	5.410	6.2 km	–	catalog · MPC · JPL
(608094) 2003 GQ_{57}	16 February 2015	Pan-STARRS	Haleakala	5.198	0.083	27.2	4.768	5.627	7.0 km	–	catalog · MPC · JPL
(608104) 2003 GG_{62}	26 January 2012	Pan-STARRS	Haleakala	5.129	0.082	4.3	4.709	5.550	6.6 km	–	catalog · MPC · JPL
(608108) 2003 GG_{65}	9 October 2008	Mount Lemmon Survey	Mount Lemmon	5.252	0.054	4.0	4.968	5.535	6.6 km	–	catalog · MPC · JPL
(608114) 2003 HF_{60}	22 June 2004	Spacewatch	Kitt Peak	5.290	0.026	20.3	5.152	5.427	8.6 km	–	catalog · MPC · JPL
(610975) 2006 OP_{25}	19 July 2006	Mauna Kea Obs.	Mauna Kea	5.169	0.029	1.6	5.021	5.317	5.9 km	–	catalog · MPC · JPL
(611049) 2006 QT_{189}	27 August 2006	Spacewatch	Kitt Peak	5.262	0.025	7.3	5.128	5.396	7.3 km	–	catalog · MPC · JPL
(613798) 2007 RK_{185}	13 September 2007	Mount Lemmon Survey	Mount Lemmon	5.296	0.065	9.1	4.951	5.642	6.1 km	–	catalog · MPC · JPL
(614015) 2008 QK_{42}	24 August 2008	Spacewatch	Kitt Peak	5.135	0.039	6.3	4.935	5.336	6.6 km	–	catalog · MPC · JPL
(614031) 2008 RK_{58}	3 September 2008	Spacewatch	Kitt Peak	5.208	0.103	17.4	4.671	5.744	8.5 km	–	catalog · MPC · JPL
(614036) 2008 RJ_{88}	5 September 2008	Spacewatch	Kitt Peak	5.215	0.075	9.7	4.822	5.607	7.0 km	–	catalog · MPC · JPL
(614041) 2008 RA_{112}	4 September 2008	Spacewatch	Kitt Peak	5.163	0.094	3.8	4.679	5.647	6.1 km	–	catalog · MPC · JPL
(614044) 2008 RL_{122}	3 September 2008	Spacewatch	Kitt Peak	5.286	0.102	3.4	4.745	5.827	6.2 km	–	catalog · MPC · JPL
(614045) 2008 RY_{124}	6 September 2008	Spacewatch	Kitt Peak	5.277	0.086	4.1	4.824	5.731	6.5 km	–	catalog · MPC · JPL
(614047) 2008 RK_{127}	6 September 2008	Spacewatch	Kitt Peak	5.135	0.046	7.6	4.900	5.369	7.7 km	–	catalog · MPC · JPL
(614067) 2008 SD_{86}	20 September 2008	Spacewatch	Kitt Peak	5.211	0.107	10.8	4.656	5.766	6.5 km	–	catalog · MPC · JPL
(614080) 2008 SH_{120}	22 September 2008	Mount Lemmon Survey	Mount Lemmon	5.238	0.233	0.3	4.016	6.460	6.6 km	–	catalog · MPC · JPL
(614114) 2008 SG_{262}	24 September 2008	Spacewatch	Kitt Peak	5.264	0.165	3.1	4.395	6.132	6.2 km	–	catalog · MPC · JPL
(614118) 2008 SP_{275}	23 September 2008	Spacewatch	Kitt Peak	5.200	0.087	6.4	4.749	5.651	6.7 km	–	catalog · MPC · JPL
(614119) 2008 SU_{275}	23 September 2008	Mount Lemmon Survey	Mount Lemmon	5.233	0.062	7.6	4.911	5.555	6.8 km	–	catalog · MPC · JPL
(614120) 2008 SV_{275}	23 September 2008	Mount Lemmon Survey	Mount Lemmon	5.259	0.080	3.4	4.836	5.682	6.9 km	–	catalog · MPC · JPL
(614121) 2008 SJ_{276}	23 September 2008	Mount Lemmon Survey	Mount Lemmon	5.165	0.054	9.1	4.886	5.444	6.9 km	–	catalog · MPC · JPL
(614122) 2008 SX_{276}	24 September 2008	Mount Lemmon Survey	Mount Lemmon	5.183	0.117	11.8	4.576	5.789	7.1 km	–	catalog · MPC · JPL
(614145) 2008 TP_{34}	1 October 2008	Mount Lemmon Survey	Mount Lemmon	5.176	0.095	7.3	4.682	5.670	9.2 km	–	catalog · MPC · JPL
(614468) 2009 RK_{72}	15 September 2009	Spacewatch	Kitt Peak	5.205	0.193	10.5	4.199	6.211	8.0 km	–	catalog · MPC · JPL
(614507) 2009 ST_{310}	18 September 2009	Spacewatch	Kitt Peak	5.200	0.045	16.9	4.968	5.433	7.5 km	–	catalog · MPC · JPL
(614524) 2009 UC_{28}	22 October 2009	Mount Lemmon Survey	Mount Lemmon	5.229	0.158	3.8	4.403	6.055	6.0 km	–	catalog · MPC · JPL
(614528) 2009 UG_{57}	23 October 2009	Mount Lemmon Survey	Mount Lemmon	5.247	0.088	6.3	4.785	5.709	7.1 km	–	catalog · MPC · JPL
(614530) 2009 UZ_{73}	21 October 2009	Mount Lemmon Survey	Mount Lemmon	5.216	0.098	3.2	4.702	5.730	6.9 km	–	catalog · MPC · JPL
(614569) 2009 WE_{59}	16 November 2009	Mount Lemmon Survey	Mount Lemmon	5.224	0.129	7.4	4.553	5.896	6.5 km	–	catalog · MPC · JPL
(614573) 2009 WG_{94}	20 November 2009	Spacewatch	Kitt Peak	5.216	0.114	14.8	4.620	5.812	6.1 km	–	catalog · MPC · JPL
(622251) 2013 EN_{69}	15 September 2007	Mount Lemmon Survey	Mount Lemmon	5.210	0.017	19.1	5.120	5.299	7.6 km	–	catalog · MPC · JPL
(626419) 2007 RQ_{72}	10 August 2007	Spacewatch	Kitt Peak	5.207	0.126	12.4	4.548	5.865	6.5 km	–	catalog · MPC · JPL
(629053) 1996 RP_{8}	6 September 1996	Spacewatch	Kitt Peak	5.185	0.072	9.3	4.809	5.561	8.3 km	–	catalog · MPC · JPL
(629083) 1998 WM_{46}	28 October 2010	Mount Lemmon Survey	Mount Lemmon	5.220	0.084	10.4	4.784	5.657	8.1 km	–	catalog · MPC · JPL
(629153) 2000 BM_{53}	15 December 1999	Spacewatch	Kitt Peak	5.260	0.066	7.6	4.912	5.607	7.8 km	–	catalog · MPC · JPL
(629259) 2001 DS_{113}	13 February 2002	Spacewatch	Kitt Peak	5.187	0.076	4.2	4.795	5.580	7.7 km	–	catalog · MPC · JPL
(629439) 2002 EO_{144}	13 March 2002	NEAT	Palomar	5.209	0.039	20.9	5.009	5.410	12 km	–	catalog · MPC · JPL
(629443) 2002 EA_{171}	18 September 2009	Spacewatch	Kitt Peak	5.245	0.031	8.7	5.080	5.409	7.1 km	–	catalog · MPC · JPL
(629451) 2002 GP_{163}	3 September 2008	Spacewatch	Kitt Peak	5.294	0.033	3.0	5.121	5.467	7.8 km	–	catalog · MPC · JPL
(629455) 2002 GH_{197}	18 September 2009	Spacewatch	Kitt Peak	5.108	0.077	6.0	4.715	5.501	7.4 km	–	catalog · MPC · JPL
(629692) 2003 GL_{21}	7 April 2003	Spacewatch	Kitt Peak	5.235	0.038	9.8	5.037	5.432	7.5 km	–	catalog · MPC · JPL
(629695) 2003 GE_{57}	8 April 2003	Spacewatch	Kitt Peak	5.176	0.093	6.5	4.694	5.657	8.1 km	–	catalog · MPC · JPL
(629702) 2003 GG_{64}	19 January 2013	Mount Lemmon Survey	Mount Lemmon	5.257	0.044	10.1	5.025	5.488	9.3 km	–	catalog · MPC · JPL
(629704) 2003 HV_{25}	25 April 2003	Spacewatch	Kitt Peak	5.203	0.050	5.2	4.945	5.462	7.9 km	–	catalog · MPC · JPL
(629709) 2003 HW_{60}	26 April 2004	Spacewatch	Kitt Peak	5.188	0.033	13.0	5.016	5.359	11 km	–	catalog · MPC · JPL
(631546) 2007 PA_{33}	8 November 2010	Mount Lemmon Survey	Mount Lemmon	5.224	0.074	6.6	4.838	5.610	6.2 km	–	catalog · MPC · JPL
(631570) 2007 RB_{64}	2 February 2001	Spacewatch	Kitt Peak	5.276	0.026	2.1	5.141	5.411	7.8 km	–	catalog · MPC · JPL
(631626) 2007 RP_{329}	28 March 2003	K. Sárneczky	Piszkéstető	5.135	0.043	6.2	4.916	5.353	8.7 km	–	catalog · MPC · JPL
(631753) 2007 TY_{454}	9 October 2007	Spacewatch	Kitt Peak	5.181	0.040	16.7	4.976	5.387	8.7 km	–	catalog · MPC · JPL
(632547) 2008 QU_{51}	24 August 2008	Spacewatch	Kitt Peak	5.229	0.062	11.7	4.906	5.553	6.6 km	–	catalog · MPC · JPL
(632548) 2008 RG_{3}	2 September 2008	Spacewatch	Kitt Peak	5.168	0.016	9.6	5.084	5.252	12 km	–	catalog · MPC · JPL
(632554) 2008 RG_{21}	4 September 2008	Spacewatch	Kitt Peak	5.328	0.095	6.1	4.823	5.833	7.4 km	–	catalog · MPC · JPL
(632577) 2008 RS_{149}	15 September 2009	Spacewatch	Kitt Peak	5.185	0.044	7.5	4.959	5.412	7.7 km	–	catalog · MPC · JPL
(632578) 2008 RC_{150}	2 October 2010	Mount Lemmon Survey	Mount Lemmon	5.191	0.065	8.0	4.852	5.530	7.8 km	–	catalog · MPC · JPL
(632581) 2008 RH_{167}	3 September 2008	Spacewatch	Kitt Peak	5.265	0.076	3.9	4.862	5.667	7.3 km	–	catalog · MPC · JPL
(632584) 2008 RD_{174}	9 September 2008	Mount Lemmon Survey	Mount Lemmon	5.248	0.068	8.3	4.890	5.605	7.7 km	–	catalog · MPC · JPL
(632586) 2008 RA_{176}	5 September 2008	Spacewatch	Kitt Peak	5.304	0.102	11.4	4.762	5.846	6.6 km	–	catalog · MPC · JPL
(632588) 2008 RZ_{181}	6 September 2008	Mount Lemmon Survey	Mount Lemmon	5.205	0.065	1.0	4.869	5.542	6.6 km	–	catalog · MPC · JPL
(632619) 2008 SV_{227}	28 September 2008	Mount Lemmon Survey	Mount Lemmon	5.199	0.019	8.4	5.100	5.298	9.3 km	–	catalog · MPC · JPL
(632621) 2008 SO_{228}	28 September 2008	Mount Lemmon Survey	Mount Lemmon	5.290	0.082	7.6	4.855	5.725	6.7 km	–	catalog · MPC · JPL
(632640) 2008 SA_{346}	20 September 2008	Mount Lemmon Survey	Mount Lemmon	5.249	0.067	5.9	4.898	5.601	6.2 km	–	catalog · MPC · JPL
(632647) 2008 TD_{30}	9 April 2002	M. W. Buie; A. B. Jordan	Cerro Tololo	5.363	0.061	3.3	5.034	5.693	6.7 km	–	catalog · MPC · JPL
(632678) 2008 TN_{211}	10 October 2008	Mount Lemmon Survey	Mount Lemmon	5.335	0.072	8.6	4.952	5.719	7.5 km	–	catalog · MPC · JPL
(632680) 2008 TU_{216}	1 October 2008	Mount Lemmon Survey	Mount Lemmon	5.249	0.064	8.6	4.912	5.586	7.4 km	–	catalog · MPC · JPL
(632700) 2008 UE_{88}	26 September 2008	Spacewatch	Kitt Peak	5.195	0.059	15.7	4.887	5.504	6.5 km	–	catalog · MPC · JPL
(632703) 2008 UY_{128}	10 October 2008	Mount Lemmon Survey	Mount Lemmon	5.294	0.031	7.1	5.129	5.460	8.6 km	–	catalog · MPC · JPL
(632775) 2008 VQ_{81}	27 March 2003	Spacewatch	Kitt Peak	5.151	0.018	7.6	5.059	5.243	10 km	–	catalog · MPC · JPL
(633323) 2009 QR_{75}	18 August 2009	Spacewatch	Kitt Peak	5.150	0.052	10.8	4.882	5.418	7.4 km	–	catalog · MPC · JPL
(633338) 2009 RG_{57}	15 September 2009	Spacewatch	Kitt Peak	5.150	0.086	8.4	4.709	5.591	6.6 km	–	catalog · MPC · JPL
(633346) 2009 RZ_{80}	15 September 2009	Spacewatch	Kitt Peak	5.173	0.081	7.3	4.755	5.592	7.4 km	–	catalog · MPC · JPL
(633399) 2009 SU_{151}	20 September 2009	Spacewatch	Kitt Peak	5.088	0.083	11.0	4.664	5.512	9.3 km	–	catalog · MPC · JPL
(633401) 2009 ST_{155}	12 September 2009	Spacewatch	Kitt Peak	5.159	0.105	8.2	4.620	5.699	6.8 km	–	catalog · MPC · JPL
(633426) 2009 SS_{201}	22 September 2009	Spacewatch	Kitt Peak	5.215	0.013	9.3	5.145	5.284	7.9 km	–	catalog · MPC · JPL
(633437) 2009 SW_{246}	7 September 2008	Mount Lemmon Survey	Mount Lemmon	5.181	0.076	8.1	4.785	5.577	7.5 km	–	catalog · MPC · JPL
(633441) 2009 SB_{252}	21 September 2009	Spacewatch	Kitt Peak	5.224	0.028	5.3	5.076	5.372	6.6 km	–	catalog · MPC · JPL
(633447) 2009 SX_{263}	23 September 2009	Mount Lemmon Survey	Mount Lemmon	5.170	0.164	8.8	4.323	6.017	6.7 km	–	catalog · MPC · JPL
(633449) 2009 SH_{272}	20 September 2009	Spacewatch	Kitt Peak	5.141	0.095	7.2	4.651	5.631	6.5 km	–	catalog · MPC · JPL
(633468) 2009 SP_{320}	21 September 2009	Mount Lemmon Survey	Mount Lemmon	5.175	0.172	13.5	4.286	6.063	7.0 km	–	catalog · MPC · JPL
(633469) 2009 SE_{321}	21 September 2009	Spacewatch	Kitt Peak	5.211	0.035	7.5	5.030	5.393	7.0 km	–	catalog · MPC · JPL
(633470) 2009 SZ_{322}	18 September 2009	Spacewatch	Kitt Peak	5.157	0.072	24.2	4.786	5.528	7.7 km	–	catalog · MPC · JPL
(633472) 2009 SB_{326}	24 April 2003	Spacewatch	Kitt Peak	5.284	0.062	8.2	4.957	5.611	9.9 km	–	catalog · MPC · JPL
(633475) 2009 SX_{354}	29 September 2009	Spacewatch	Kitt Peak	5.107	0.079	8.0	4.702	5.513	7.0 km	–	catalog · MPC · JPL
(633476) 2009 SU_{355}	13 February 2002	Spacewatch	Kitt Peak	5.228	0.059	7.1	4.919	5.537	6.5 km	–	catalog · MPC · JPL
(633477) 2009 SD_{356}	27 September 2009	Spacewatch	Kitt Peak	5.209	0.049	7.3	4.956	5.462	6.5 km	–	catalog · MPC · JPL
(633503) 2009 SS_{409}	18 September 2009	Spacewatch	Kitt Peak	5.133	0.098	7.1	4.629	5.638	6.1 km	–	catalog · MPC · JPL
(633508) 2009 ST_{414}	20 September 2009	Spacewatch	Kitt Peak	5.323	0.095	6.1	4.817	5.829	6.8 km	–	catalog · MPC · JPL
(633527) 2009 UP_{3}	19 October 2009	A. Lowe	Mayhill	5.211	0.032	14.2	5.045	5.378	12 km	–	catalog · MPC · JPL
(633566) 2009 UU_{120}	12 September 2009	Spacewatch	Kitt Peak	5.111	0.062	9.3	4.795	5.427	6.3 km	–	catalog · MPC · JPL
(633580) 2009 UG_{171}	20 October 2012	Mount Lemmon Survey	Mount Lemmon	5.182	0.040	24.0	4.974	5.390	8.3 km	–	catalog · MPC · JPL
(633581) 2009 UX_{173}	22 October 2009	Mount Lemmon Survey	Mount Lemmon	5.261	0.067	7.3	4.911	5.612	7.8 km	–	catalog · MPC · JPL
(633585) 2009 UF_{179}	22 October 2009	Mount Lemmon Survey	Mount Lemmon	5.299	0.098	7.0	4.779	5.819	6.9 km	–	catalog · MPC · JPL
(633590) 2009 UK_{190}	18 October 2009	Mount Lemmon Survey	Mount Lemmon	5.199	0.057	6.4	4.904	5.494	6.4 km	–	catalog · MPC · JPL
(633625) 2009 VD_{128}	8 November 2009	Mount Lemmon Survey	Mount Lemmon	5.279	0.048	6.1	5.026	5.533	6.6 km	–	catalog · MPC · JPL
(633672) 2009 WH_{113}	26 September 2009	Spacewatch	Kitt Peak	5.183	0.046	10.5	4.945	5.421	8.3 km	–	catalog · MPC · JPL
(633819) 2010 CC_{252}	28 January 2015	Pan-STARRS	Haleakala	5.282	0.024	17.4	5.154	5.409	7.9 km	–	catalog · MPC · JPL
(633940) 2010 RF_{214}	4 September 2010	Spacewatch	Kitt Peak	5.156	0.127	11.6	4.502	5.811	6.6 km	–	catalog · MPC · JPL
(633970) 2010 TP_{221}	13 October 2010	Mount Lemmon Survey	Mount Lemmon	5.121	0.060	13.7	4.814	5.428	6.3 km	–	catalog · MPC · JPL
(633984) 2010 UU_{124}	30 October 2010	Mount Lemmon Survey	Mount Lemmon	5.184	0.042	9.8	4.967	5.402	6.9 km	–	catalog · MPC · JPL
(634003) 2010 VV_{180}	25 September 2009	Spacewatch	Kitt Peak	5.162	0.156	12.0	4.357	5.966	6.9 km	–	catalog · MPC · JPL
(634008) 2010 VJ_{225}	1 November 2010	Mount Lemmon Survey	Mount Lemmon	5.103	0.111	6.2	4.536	5.670	6.4 km	–	catalog · MPC · JPL
(634013) 2010 VS_{244}	24 March 2015	Pan-STARRS	Haleakala	5.101	0.092	9.0	4.632	5.570	6.1 km	–	catalog · MPC · JPL
(634018) 2010 VE_{263}	1 November 2010	Spacewatch	Kitt Peak	5.162	0.083	15.4	4.736	5.588	7.9 km	–	catalog · MPC · JPL
(634022) 2010 VF_{275}	13 November 2010	Mount Lemmon Survey	Mount Lemmon	5.203	0.060	12.7	4.892	5.513	7.3 km	–	catalog · MPC · JPL
(634034) 2010 XB_{22}	4 December 2010	Z. Kuli; K. Sárneczky	Piszkéstető	5.223	0.138	7.9	4.504	5.943	6.1 km	–	catalog · MPC · JPL
(634040) 2010 XR_{70}	5 September 2010	Mount Lemmon Survey	Mount Lemmon	5.113	0.069	18.7	4.758	5.468	7.7 km	–	catalog · MPC · JPL
(634041) 2010 XJ_{74}	8 November 2010	Mount Lemmon Survey	Mount Lemmon	5.246	0.130	19.3	4.562	5.930	9.2 km	–	catalog · MPC · JPL
(634475) 2011 SP_{277}	2 November 2010	Spacewatch	Kitt Peak	5.302	0.072	10.6	4.922	5.681	8.5 km	–	catalog · MPC · JPL
(634565) 2011 WA_{24}	26 October 2011	Pan-STARRS	Haleakala	5.082	0.051	2.2	4.824	5.339	5.9 km	–	catalog · MPC · JPL
(634570) 2011 WK_{46}	26 November 2011	Pan-STARRS	Haleakala	5.211	0.062	7.6	4.885	5.536	9.7 km	–	catalog · MPC · JPL
(634583) 2011 WF_{184}	25 November 2011	Pan-STARRS	Haleakala	5.212	0.062	6.0	4.887	5.538	6.3 km	–	catalog · MPC · JPL
(634585) 2011 YV_{5}	17 September 2009	Spacewatch	Kitt Peak	5.224	0.129	6.7	4.551	5.898	7.0 km	–	catalog · MPC · JPL
(634587) 2011 YK_{32}	14 October 2010	Mount Lemmon Survey	Mount Lemmon	5.143	0.056	7.3	4.855	5.432	7.2 km	–	catalog · MPC · JPL
(634591) 2011 YU_{71}	28 September 2009	Mount Lemmon Survey	Mount Lemmon	5.135	0.082	8.8	4.713	5.557	8.6 km	–	catalog · MPC · JPL
(634593) 2011 YD_{96}	29 December 2011	Mount Lemmon Survey	Mount Lemmon	5.201	0.060	8.5	4.889	5.513	6.5 km	–	catalog · MPC · JPL
(634594) 2012 AG_{4}	1 January 2012	Mount Lemmon Survey	Mount Lemmon	5.170	0.112	30.9	4.591	5.750	8.9 km	–	catalog · MPC · JPL
(634596) 2012 AC_{8}	8 October 2008	Spacewatch	Kitt Peak	5.273	0.020	6.6	5.167	5.379	8.2 km	–	catalog · MPC · JPL
(634597) 2012 AM_{12}	22 October 2009	Mount Lemmon Survey	Mount Lemmon	5.233	0.139	6.2	4.507	5.959	7.9 km	–	catalog · MPC · JPL
(634601) 2012 BT_{2}	5 June 2005	Spacewatch	Kitt Peak	5.268	0.082	19.2	4.836	5.700	11 km	–	catalog · MPC · JPL
(634604) 2012 BA_{42}	5 November 1996	Spacewatch	Kitt Peak	5.334	0.043	8.4	5.102	5.565	8.7 km	–	catalog · MPC · JPL
(634633) 2012 BO_{185}	20 November 2009	Mount Lemmon Survey	Mount Lemmon	5.310	0.107	3.8	4.740	5.879	6.4 km	–	catalog · MPC · JPL
(634641) 2012 CV_{45}	1 October 2008	Mount Lemmon Survey	Mount Lemmon	5.198	0.052	12.3	4.929	5.468	7.2 km	–	catalog · MPC · JPL
(634760) 2012 JK_{67}	6 November 2010	Mount Lemmon Survey	Mount Lemmon	5.155	0.086	15.5	4.712	5.598	8.0 km	–	catalog · MPC · JPL
(635019) 2012 UF_{163}	22 October 2012	Spacewatch	Kitt Peak	5.242	0.102	10.1	4.706	5.778	11 km	–	catalog · MPC · JPL
(635143) 2013 AX_{53}	13 February 2002	SDSS Collaboration	Apache Point	5.160	0.052	20.2	4.891	5.429	13 km	–	catalog · MPC · JPL
(635151) 2013 AV_{75}	12 January 2013	W. Bickel	Bergisch Gladbach	5.124	0.022	22.1	5.010	5.239	9.7 km	–	catalog · MPC · JPL
(635155) 2013 AQ_{95}	4 January 2013	Spacewatch	Kitt Peak	5.174	0.125	19.5	4.524	5.823	10 km	–	catalog · MPC · JPL
(635161) 2013 AJ_{104}	3 November 2007	Mount Lemmon Survey	Mount Lemmon	5.184	0.125	16.9	4.538	5.831	13 km	–	catalog · MPC · JPL
(635162) 2013 AV_{111}	13 January 2013	ESA OGS	ESA OGS	5.163	0.069	10.1	4.807	5.520	6.9 km	–	catalog · MPC · JPL
(635165) 2013 AX_{116}	5 January 2013	Spacewatch	Kitt Peak	5.178	0.074	18.5	4.797	5.558	8.1 km	–	catalog · MPC · JPL
(635174) 2013 AQ_{156}	4 January 2013	CTIO-DECam	Cerro Tololo-DECam	5.220	0.114	17.1	4.627	5.812	7.3 km	–	catalog · MPC · JPL
(635176) 2013 AM_{166}	18 September 2009	Spacewatch	Kitt Peak	5.187	0.052	9.7	4.917	5.457	5.9 km	–	catalog · MPC · JPL
(635185) 2013 BT	30 May 2006	Mount Lemmon Survey	Mount Lemmon	5.218	0.070	31.6	4.850	5.585	11 km	–	catalog · MPC · JPL
(635186) 2013 BE_{1}	23 December 2012	Pan-STARRS	Haleakala	5.196	0.104	22.4	4.658	5.735	7.3 km	–	catalog · MPC · JPL
(635187) 2013 BP_{1}	16 December 2011	Pan-STARRS	Haleakala	5.245	0.068	30.1	4.891	5.600	10 km	–	catalog · MPC · JPL
(635188) 2013 BH_{2}	16 January 2013	Pan-STARRS	Haleakala	5.107	0.042	7.8	4.892	5.322	6.4 km	–	catalog · MPC · JPL
(635191) 2013 BJ_{11}	13 October 2010	Spacewatch	Kitt Peak	5.123	0.044	8.6	4.900	5.346	7.5 km	–	catalog · MPC · JPL
(635192) 2013 BP_{14}	30 September 1997	AMOS	Haleakala	5.126	0.077	10.9	4.729	5.522	10 km	–	catalog · MPC · JPL
(635193) 2013 BZ_{15}	6 April 2002	Cerro Tololo Obs.	Cerro Tololo	5.105	0.055	6.8	4.824	5.385	6.1 km	–	catalog · MPC · JPL
(635194) 2013 BT_{17}	12 November 2012	Mount Lemmon Survey	Mount Lemmon	5.183	0.078	15.4	4.781	5.585	8.7 km	–	catalog · MPC · JPL
(635195) 2013 BT_{27}	16 September 2009	Spacewatch	Kitt Peak	5.169	0.045	8.0	4.934	5.404	8.5 km	–	catalog · MPC · JPL
(635202) 2013 BP_{60}	10 September 2010	Spacewatch	Kitt Peak	5.244	0.055	10.0	4.955	5.532	8.8 km	–	catalog · MPC · JPL
(635204) 2013 BB_{69}	20 January 2013	Spacewatch	Kitt Peak	5.097	0.063	5.4	4.777	5.417	5.9 km	–	catalog · MPC · JPL
(635205) 2013 BD_{73}	16 January 2013	Mount Lemmon Survey	Mount Lemmon	5.204	0.100	11.8	4.683	5.726	7.0 km	–	catalog · MPC · JPL
(635212) 2013 BE_{99}	20 January 2013	Spacewatch	Kitt Peak	5.196	0.055	7.6	4.909	5.483	6.5 km	–	catalog · MPC · JPL
(635213) 2013 BQ_{102}	19 January 2013	Spacewatch	Kitt Peak	5.130	0.070	5.0	4.772	5.487	6.5 km	–	catalog · MPC · JPL
(635221) 2013 CV_{28}	7 September 2008	Mount Lemmon Survey	Mount Lemmon	5.142	0.062	3.6	4.826	5.459	7.1 km	–	catalog · MPC · JPL
(635224) 2013 CC_{41}	14 October 2009	Mount Lemmon Survey	Mount Lemmon	5.207	0.067	2.6	4.858	5.556	7.0 km	–	catalog · MPC · JPL
(635232) 2013 CX_{63}	8 February 2013	Pan-STARRS	Haleakala	5.285	0.065	10.6	4.940	5.629	8.2 km	–	catalog · MPC · JPL
(635240) 2013 CK_{104}	20 January 2013	Spacewatch	Kitt Peak	5.229	0.081	10.1	4.805	5.653	7.9 km	–	catalog · MPC · JPL
(635242) 2013 CC_{111}	28 September 2009	Spacewatch	Kitt Peak	5.227	0.108	7.8	4.660	5.793	7.3 km	–	catalog · MPC · JPL
(635255) 2013 CF_{200}	27 October 2009	Mount Lemmon Survey	Mount Lemmon	5.143	0.098	7.6	4.637	5.649	6.4 km	–	catalog · MPC · JPL
(635256) 2013 CE_{201}	11 September 2007	Mount Lemmon Survey	Mount Lemmon	5.105	0.041	11.4	4.898	5.312	8.0 km	–	catalog · MPC · JPL
(635266) 2013 CD_{219}	21 September 2009	Spacewatch	Kitt Peak	5.185	0.083	11.6	4.757	5.614	6.2 km	–	catalog · MPC · JPL
(635267) 2013 CP_{223}	10 September 2007	Spacewatch	Kitt Peak	5.243	0.047	7.3	4.996	5.489	8.2 km	–	catalog · MPC · JPL
(635270) 2013 CB_{249}	15 February 2013	Pan-STARRS	Haleakala	5.194	0.083	6.2	4.761	5.627	6.7 km	–	catalog · MPC · JPL
(635272) 2013 DK	5 February 2013	Spacewatch	Kitt Peak	5.201	0.052	8.1	4.929	5.474	7.2 km	–	catalog · MPC · JPL
(635302) 2013 EM_{154}	26 January 2000	Spacewatch	Kitt Peak	5.310	0.094	6.2	4.810	5.810	7.6 km	–	catalog · MPC · JPL
(635637) 2013 YK_{105}	11 August 2007	W. Bickel	Bergisch Gladbach	5.214	0.042	15.6	4.993	5.436	9.9 km	–	catalog · MPC · JPL
(635741) 2014 DA_{42}	5 January 2013	Mount Lemmon Survey	Mount Lemmon	5.185	0.023	10.0	5.067	5.303	8.2 km	–	catalog · MPC · JPL
(635769) 2014 DK_{123}	11 October 2010	Mount Lemmon Survey	Mount Lemmon	5.150	0.106	4.7	4.604	5.697	6.6 km	–	catalog · MPC · JPL
(635794) 2014 EM_{16}	16 September 2009	Spacewatch	Kitt Peak	5.269	0.034	4.9	5.089	5.448	8.2 km	–	catalog · MPC · JPL
(635818) 2014 EQ_{55}	10 November 2010	Mount Lemmon Survey	Mount Lemmon	5.149	0.055	5.2	4.866	5.432	6.9 km	–	catalog · MPC · JPL
(635822) 2014 EX_{69}	24 August 2008	Spacewatch	Kitt Peak	5.150	0.036	6.1	4.967	5.333	7.4 km	–	catalog · MPC · JPL
(635825) 2014 EO_{74}	18 January 2013	Pan-STARRS	Haleakala	5.228	0.043	9.9	5.005	5.451	7.2 km	–	catalog · MPC · JPL
(635826) 2014 ES_{95}	7 September 2008	Mount Lemmon Survey	Mount Lemmon	5.122	0.092	6.7	4.648	5.595	6.8 km	–	catalog · MPC · JPL
(635836) 2014 EP_{148}	28 February 2014	Pan-STARRS	Haleakala	5.205	0.147	15.8	4.438	5.972	6.0 km	–	catalog · MPC · JPL
(635846) 2014 EN_{243}	30 October 2010	Mount Lemmon Survey	Mount Lemmon	5.256	0.088	11.1	4.796	5.717	7.4 km	–	catalog · MPC · JPL
(635887) 2014 GL_{9}	23 October 2009	Mount Lemmon Survey	Mount Lemmon	5.253	0.010	7.0	5.202	5.303	7.5 km	–	catalog · MPC · JPL
(635896) 2014 GC_{48}	7 April 2014	Mount Lemmon Survey	Mount Lemmon	5.250	0.079	18.1	4.837	5.663	9.7 km	–	catalog · MPC · JPL
(635925) 2014 HY_{143}	3 September 2008	Spacewatch	Kitt Peak	5.215	0.066	9.8	4.869	5.562	8.7 km	–	catalog · MPC · JPL
(635997) 2014 KZ_{84}	18 November 2011	Mount Lemmon Survey	Mount Lemmon	5.250	0.066	10.9	4.903	5.597	10 km	–	catalog · MPC · JPL
(637117) 2015 BG_{513}	2 May 2003	Spacewatch	Kitt Peak	5.298	0.026	9.0	5.161	5.435	10 km	–	catalog · MPC · JPL
(637118) 2015 BJ_{521}	3 September 2008	Spacewatch	Kitt Peak	5.215	0.011	2.8	5.158	5.272	6.8 km	–	catalog · MPC · JPL
(637219) 2015 DZ_{124}	1 December 2011	Pan-STARRS	Haleakala	5.144	0.044	13.2	4.915	5.372	8.5 km	–	catalog · MPC · JPL
(637261) 2015 DT_{225}	31 March 2003	Spacewatch	Kitt Peak	5.185	0.038	7.2	4.990	5.380	8.3 km	–	catalog · MPC · JPL
(637308) 2015 ER_{64}	22 April 2004	Spacewatch	Kitt Peak	5.217	0.027	20.4	5.074	5.359	11 km	–	catalog · MPC · JPL
(637316) 2015 FP_{40}	10 September 2007	Mount Lemmon Survey	Mount Lemmon	5.295	0.020	1.6	5.191	5.400	8.0 km	–	catalog · MPC · JPL
(637340) 2015 FC_{140}	16 March 2015	Spacewatch	Kitt Peak	5.198	0.113	20.1	4.611	5.785	7.4 km	–	catalog · MPC · JPL
(637344) 2015 FF_{141}	17 October 2010	Mount Lemmon Survey	Mount Lemmon	5.285	0.091	6.6	4.804	5.766	8.5 km	–	catalog · MPC · JPL
(637430) 2015 FM_{354}	30 March 2003	M. W. Buie; A. B. Jordan	Kitt Peak	5.233	0.106	10.2	4.676	5.790	6.9 km	–	catalog · MPC · JPL
(637432) 2015 FJ_{356}	5 September 2008	Spacewatch	Kitt Peak	5.241	0.090	14.0	4.772	5.710	8.2 km	–	catalog · MPC · JPL
(637439) 2015 FN_{361}	2 February 2001	Spacewatch	Kitt Peak	5.262	0.075	5.5	4.869	5.655	6.5 km	–	catalog · MPC · JPL
(637466) 2015 FW_{437}	21 March 2015	Pan-STARRS	Haleakala	5.149	0.058	13.7	4.849	5.450	7.1 km	–	catalog · MPC · JPL
(637467) 2015 FB_{440}	25 March 2015	Pan-STARRS	Haleakala	5.223	0.037	14.7	5.029	5.418	7.6 km	–	catalog · MPC · JPL
(637476) 2015 GP_{17}	16 August 2009	Spacewatch	Kitt Peak	5.114	0.064	9.6	4.785	5.443	8.3 km	–	catalog · MPC · JPL
(637485) 2015 GZ_{35}	2 October 2008	Mount Lemmon Survey	Mount Lemmon	5.074	0.034	8.3	4.900	5.248	7.0 km	–	catalog · MPC · JPL
(637494) 2015 GW_{50}	30 May 2003	M. W. Buie; K. J. Meech	Cerro Tololo	5.183	0.023	5.9	5.064	5.303	8.0 km	–	catalog · MPC · JPL
(637495) 2015 GX_{50}	17 October 2010	Mount Lemmon Survey	Mount Lemmon	5.165	0.098	9.7	4.659	5.670	8.2 km	–	catalog · MPC · JPL
(637498) 2015 HD_{4}	21 June 2007	Mount Lemmon Survey	Mount Lemmon	5.162	0.059	11.3	4.860	5.464	8.2 km	–	catalog · MPC · JPL
(637499) 2015 HM_{5}	30 July 2008	Spacewatch	Kitt Peak	5.195	0.076	25.6	4.802	5.589	10 km	–	catalog · MPC · JPL
(637502) 2015 HC_{18}	25 September 2008	Mount Lemmon Survey	Mount Lemmon	5.186	0.034	4.8	5.011	5.362	8.3 km	–	catalog · MPC · JPL
(637516) 2015 HB_{42}	14 October 1998	Spacewatch	Kitt Peak	5.126	0.016	11.0	5.047	5.206	9.8 km	–	catalog · MPC · JPL
(637537) 2015 HP_{76}	9 October 2008	Mount Lemmon Survey	Mount Lemmon	5.327	0.051	4.5	5.057	5.597	7.9 km	–	catalog · MPC · JPL
(637541) 2015 HD_{79}	14 September 2009	Spacewatch	Kitt Peak	5.196	0.059	10.2	4.890	5.501	9.8 km	–	catalog · MPC · JPL
(637545) 2015 HL_{89}	1 October 2008	Mount Lemmon Survey	Mount Lemmon	5.228	0.046	6.7	4.986	5.470	7.8 km	–	catalog · MPC · JPL
(637566) 2015 HU_{152}	24 August 2007	Spacewatch	Kitt Peak	5.176	0.035	4.5	4.993	5.359	7.2 km	–	catalog · MPC · JPL
(637597) 2015 HR_{219}	24 February 2014	Pan-STARRS	Haleakala	5.141	0.115	11.3	4.549	5.732	6.5 km	–	catalog · MPC · JPL
(637642) 2015 KJ_{64}	2 December 2010	Mount Lemmon Survey	Mount Lemmon	5.207	0.056	8.4	4.915	5.499	8.3 km	–	catalog · MPC · JPL
(637718) 2015 LE_{40}	10 October 2010	Mount Lemmon Survey	Mount Lemmon	5.179	0.080	10.1	4.763	5.595	8.5 km	–	catalog · MPC · JPL
(637730) 2015 MR_{25}	9 October 2010	Mount Lemmon Survey	Mount Lemmon	5.269	0.178	9.4	4.333	6.205	6.6 km	–	catalog · MPC · JPL
(638923) 2016 GV_{178}	26 October 2011	Pan-STARRS	Haleakala	5.142	0.068	14.3	4.793	5.490	7.4 km	–	catalog · MPC · JPL
(638936) 2016 GY_{236}	27 September 2009	Mount Lemmon Survey	Mount Lemmon	5.203	0.036	8.9	5.017	5.389	9.5 km	–	catalog · MPC · JPL
(638944) 2016 GV_{252}	4 April 2016	Mount Lemmon Survey	Mount Lemmon	5.253	0.059	21.4	4.942	5.564	8.1 km	–	catalog · MPC · JPL
(638970) 2016 JA_{8}	26 October 2011	Pan-STARRS	Haleakala	5.161	0.138	14.0	4.449	5.872	7.9 km	–	catalog · MPC · JPL
(638994) 2016 LJ_{24}	22 June 2004	Spacewatch	Kitt Peak	5.252	0.049	19.3	4.994	5.510	9.3 km	–	catalog · MPC · JPL
(639002) 2016 MB_{2}	26 February 2014	Mount Lemmon Survey	Mount Lemmon	5.194	0.022	9.8	5.077	5.310	8.1 km	–	catalog · MPC · JPL
(639940) 2018 NP_{6}	3 February 2013	Pan-STARRS	Haleakala	5.292	0.005	6.0	5.267	5.317	7.3 km	–	catalog · MPC · JPL
(640015) 1995 QG_{12}	22 August 1995	Spacewatch	Kitt Peak	5.207	0.041	17.0	4.996	5.418	9.5 km	–	catalog · MPC · JPL
(640062) 1996 RO_{20}	15 September 1996	Spacewatch	Kitt Peak	5.269	0.023	28.4	5.146	5.391	8.8 km	–	catalog · MPC · JPL
(640064) 1996 RG_{34}	1 April 2003	SDSS Collaboration	Apache Point	5.209	0.067	19.5	4.860	5.559	9.7 km	–	catalog · MPC · JPL
(640110) 1998 SS_{179}	9 April 2003	Spacewatch	Kitt Peak	5.129	0.089	16.9	4.674	5.584	7.8 km	–	catalog · MPC · JPL
(640113) 1998 TY_{21}	13 October 1998	Spacewatch	Kitt Peak	5.095	0.066	24.5	4.757	5.433	7.9 km	–	catalog · MPC · JPL
(640116) 1998 VH_{57}	30 September 2010	Mount Lemmon Survey	Mount Lemmon	5.202	0.099	10.3	4.686	5.718	9.3 km	–	catalog · MPC · JPL
(640119) 1998 WQ_{38}	15 November 1998	Spacewatch	Kitt Peak	5.161	0.101	15.7	4.642	5.681	7.8 km	–	catalog · MPC · JPL
(640123) 1998 WX_{46}	10 November 2010	Mount Lemmon Survey	Mount Lemmon	5.244	0.182	4.1	4.288	6.201	6.1 km	–	catalog · MPC · JPL
(640220) 1999 XO_{266}	5 December 1999	Spacewatch	Kitt Peak	5.154	0.062	13.9	4.835	5.472	9.2 km	–	catalog · MPC · JPL
(640222) 1999 YF_{20}	26 January 2012	Pan-STARRS	Haleakala	5.231	0.041	14.6	5.019	5.444	6.3 km	–	catalog · MPC · JPL
(640224) 1999 YN_{30}	15 September 2009	Spacewatch	Kitt Peak	5.244	0.106	2.3	4.689	5.798	6.5 km	–	catalog · MPC · JPL
(640229) 2000 AR_{259}	6 December 2010	Mount Lemmon Survey	Mount Lemmon	5.257	0.129	12.6	4.579	5.934	6.9 km	–	catalog · MPC · JPL
(640230) 2000 AZ_{259}	3 December 2010	Spacewatch	Kitt Peak	5.177	0.086	6.8	4.730	5.623	6.7 km	–	catalog · MPC · JPL
(640771) 2002 CH_{326}	12 February 2013	Pan-STARRS	Haleakala	5.191	0.008	22.9	5.149	5.232	6.6 km	–	catalog · MPC · JPL
(640772) 2002 CJ_{326}	6 November 2010	Mount Lemmon Survey	Mount Lemmon	5.148	0.073	9.1	4.773	5.522	6.2 km	–	catalog · MPC · JPL
(640776) 2002 CA_{327}	16 October 2009	Mount Lemmon Survey	Mount Lemmon	5.203	0.050	9.9	4.940	5.465	6.4 km	–	catalog · MPC · JPL
(640796) 2002 EQ_{157}	11 March 2002	Spacewatch	Kitt Peak	5.243	0.093	4.2	4.756	5.730	6.6 km	–	catalog · MPC · JPL
(640812) 2002 EC_{171}	5 March 2002	SDSS Collaboration	Apache Point	5.210	0.031	18.9	5.047	5.374	6.8 km	–	catalog · MPC · JPL
(640813) 2002 EF_{171}	13 October 2010	Spacewatch	Kitt Peak	5.255	0.092	8.4	4.773	5.737	7.2 km	–	catalog · MPC · JPL
(640849) 2002 GN_{197}	19 January 2012	Mount Lemmon Survey	Mount Lemmon	5.107	0.056	12.3	4.819	5.395	7.2 km	–	catalog · MPC · JPL
(641191) 2003 FN_{122}	31 March 2003	Cerro Tololo Obs.	Cerro Tololo	5.178	0.045	2.8	4.947	5.409	5.9 km	–	catalog · MPC · JPL
(641193) 2003 FB_{125}	30 March 2003	M. W. Buie; A. B. Jordan	Kitt Peak	5.155	0.042	28.3	4.938	5.372	8.4 km	–	catalog · MPC · JPL
(641206) 2003 FS_{139}	12 November 2010	Mount Lemmon Survey	Mount Lemmon	5.189	0.060	9.2	4.879	5.499	9.5 km	–	catalog · MPC · JPL
(641210) 2003 FT_{140}	27 December 2011	Mount Lemmon Survey	Mount Lemmon	5.156	0.075	18.8	4.771	5.542	8.6 km	–	catalog · MPC · JPL
(641221) 2003 GP_{58}	28 December 2011	Mount Lemmon Survey	Mount Lemmon	5.210	0.083	2.8	4.776	5.645	7.7 km	–	catalog · MPC · JPL
(641234) 2003 GJ_{64}	5 April 2003	Spacewatch	Kitt Peak	5.117	0.039	26.2	4.916	5.318	8.7 km	–	catalog · MPC · JPL
(641235) 2003 GM_{64}	27 February 2014	Mount Lemmon Survey	Mount Lemmon	5.122	0.044	22.0	4.897	5.347	7.9 km	–	catalog · MPC · JPL
(641694) 2004 KW_{21}	10 November 2009	Mount Lemmon Survey	Mount Lemmon	5.169	0.054	10.6	4.891	5.446	8.1 km	–	catalog · MPC · JPL
(641696) 2004 KK_{22}	1 November 2008	Mount Lemmon Survey	Mount Lemmon	5.195	0.041	11.9	4.980	5.410	7.6 km	–	catalog · MPC · JPL
(641702) 2004 LR_{32}	3 September 2008	Spacewatch	Kitt Peak	5.242	0.033	16.3	5.068	5.416	7.2 km	–	catalog · MPC · JPL
(645329) 2007 PX_{4}	9 August 2007	Spacewatch	Kitt Peak	5.245	0.062	9.5	4.919	5.572	7.1 km	–	catalog · MPC · JPL
(645339) 2007 PO_{52}	26 January 2012	Pan-STARRS	Haleakala	5.206	0.099	20.3	4.692	5.720	6.8 km	–	catalog · MPC · JPL
(645396) 2007 RJ_{198}	13 September 2007	Mount Lemmon Survey	Mount Lemmon	5.192	0.053	24.7	4.915	5.469	6.3 km	–	catalog · MPC · JPL
(645397) 2007 RL_{198}	13 September 2007	Mount Lemmon Survey	Mount Lemmon	5.241	0.084	24.2	4.803	5.679	8.0 km	–	catalog · MPC · JPL
(645460) 2007 RX_{347}	18 February 2015	Pan-STARRS	Haleakala	5.180	0.044	11.7	4.951	5.409	7.3 km	–	catalog · MPC · JPL
(645461) 2007 RD_{348}	10 November 2009	Mount Lemmon Survey	Mount Lemmon	5.216	0.162	3.6	4.374	6.059	6.7 km	–	catalog · MPC · JPL
(645472) 2007 RB_{356}	11 September 2007	Spacewatch	Kitt Peak	5.280	0.105	17.1	4.725	5.835	7.1 km	–	catalog · MPC · JPL
(645480) 2007 RX_{377}	10 September 2007	Spacewatch	Kitt Peak	5.242	0.038	4.7	5.040	5.444	5.9 km	–	catalog · MPC · JPL
(645487) 2007 SN_{27}	8 October 2008	Spacewatch	Kitt Peak	5.163	0.060	9.0	4.851	5.475	7.5 km	–	catalog · MPC · JPL
(645581) 2007 TJ_{359}	12 September 2007	Spacewatch	Kitt Peak	5.245	0.047	3.9	4.998	5.492	6.2 km	–	catalog · MPC · JPL
(647067) 2008 OW_{32}	29 July 2008	Spacewatch	Kitt Peak	5.282	0.095	19.5	4.782	5.783	8.0 km	–	catalog · MPC · JPL
(647068) 2008 OY_{32}	30 July 2008	Mount Lemmon Survey	Mount Lemmon	5.179	0.083	9.7	4.750	5.608	6.7 km	–	catalog · MPC · JPL
(647102) 2008 QO_{51}	24 August 2008	Spacewatch	Kitt Peak	5.151	0.061	14.8	4.838	5.464	5.9 km	–	catalog · MPC · JPL
(647118) 2008 RV_{45}	2 September 2008	Spacewatch	Kitt Peak	5.300	0.102	8.1	4.757	5.843	5.9 km	–	catalog · MPC · JPL
(647127) 2008 RA_{57}	3 September 2008	Spacewatch	Kitt Peak	5.237	0.094	5.4	4.747	5.727	6.4 km	–	catalog · MPC · JPL
(647134) 2008 RG_{83}	4 September 2008	Spacewatch	Kitt Peak	5.204	0.082	7.7	4.779	5.629	6.5 km	–	catalog · MPC · JPL
(647141) 2008 RZ_{90}	29 July 2008	Spacewatch	Kitt Peak	5.113	0.115	14.5	4.527	5.699	7.5 km	–	catalog · MPC · JPL
(647147) 2008 RN_{109}	2 September 2008	Spacewatch	Kitt Peak	5.305	0.036	7.9	5.112	5.498	7.8 km	–	catalog · MPC · JPL
(647150) 2008 RV_{113}	6 September 2008	Spacewatch	Kitt Peak	5.345	0.071	11.9	4.967	5.723	6.2 km	–	catalog · MPC · JPL
(647152) 2008 RO_{121}	2 September 2008	Spacewatch	Kitt Peak	5.251	0.097	29.8	4.743	5.758	7.5 km	–	catalog · MPC · JPL
(647153) 2008 RN_{122}	4 September 2008	Spacewatch	Kitt Peak	5.179	0.109	28.1	4.614	5.744	7.2 km	–	catalog · MPC · JPL
(647155) 2008 RB_{124}	6 September 2008	Spacewatch	Kitt Peak	5.243	0.054	30.2	4.959	5.528	8.2 km	–	catalog · MPC · JPL
(647161) 2008 RQ_{147}	4 September 2008	Spacewatch	Kitt Peak	5.215	0.089	20.7	4.749	5.682	7.4 km	–	catalog · MPC · JPL
(647170) 2008 RV_{152}	4 September 2008	Spacewatch	Kitt Peak	5.194	0.058	5.3	4.894	5.494	7.2 km	–	catalog · MPC · JPL
(647178) 2008 RV_{157}	3 September 2008	Spacewatch	Kitt Peak	5.160	0.095	14.3	4.670	5.650	7.1 km	–	catalog · MPC · JPL
(647183) 2008 RM_{161}	3 September 2008	Spacewatch	Kitt Peak	5.243	0.078	4.0	4.836	5.650	7.7 km	–	catalog · MPC · JPL
(647187) 2008 RL_{164}	6 September 2008	Mount Lemmon Survey	Mount Lemmon	5.191	0.084	15.9	4.753	5.629	7.6 km	–	catalog · MPC · JPL
(647192) 2008 RF_{166}	2 January 2012	Mount Lemmon Survey	Mount Lemmon	5.283	0.152	9.5	4.481	6.085	6.0 km	–	catalog · MPC · JPL
(647195) 2008 RL_{167}	4 September 2008	Spacewatch	Kitt Peak	5.227	0.046	4.2	4.988	5.466	7.1 km	–	catalog · MPC · JPL
(647201) 2008 RM_{172}	7 September 2008	Mount Lemmon Survey	Mount Lemmon	5.208	0.137	18.7	4.493	5.923	7.3 km	–	catalog · MPC · JPL
(647205) 2008 RT_{174}	4 September 2008	Spacewatch	Kitt Peak	5.281	0.086	7.8	4.825	5.736	7.9 km	–	catalog · MPC · JPL
(647206) 2008 RU_{174}	2 September 2008	Spacewatch	Kitt Peak	5.153	0.089	21.0	4.694	5.612	7.1 km	–	catalog · MPC · JPL
(647207) 2008 RW_{174}	3 September 2008	Spacewatch	Kitt Peak	5.184	0.073	5.7	4.805	5.564	7.4 km	–	catalog · MPC · JPL
(647209) 2008 RQ_{175}	6 September 2008	Mount Lemmon Survey	Mount Lemmon	5.169	0.014	31.2	5.099	5.240	8.1 km	–	catalog · MPC · JPL
(647210) 2008 RY_{175}	2 September 2008	Spacewatch	Kitt Peak	5.125	0.054	4.4	4.849	5.400	6.7 km	–	catalog · MPC · JPL
(647215) 2008 RW_{180}	3 September 2008	Spacewatch	Kitt Peak	5.237	0.061	5.0	4.916	5.558	7.3 km	–	catalog · MPC · JPL
(647232) 2008 SW_{73}	4 September 2008	Spacewatch	Kitt Peak	5.189	0.015	6.7	5.109	5.270	7.6 km	–	catalog · MPC · JPL
(647235) 2008 SD_{77}	23 September 2008	Mount Lemmon Survey	Mount Lemmon	5.180	0.080	10.5	4.764	5.596	6.3 km	–	catalog · MPC · JPL
(647258) 2008 SV_{133}	23 September 2008	Spacewatch	Kitt Peak	5.234	0.109	11.2	4.665	5.803	6.8 km	–	catalog · MPC · JPL
(647271) 2008 SB_{171}	21 September 2008	Mount Lemmon Survey	Mount Lemmon	5.161	0.095	21.0	4.669	5.653	7.0 km	–	catalog · MPC · JPL
(647288) 2008 SE_{214}	29 September 2008	Mount Lemmon Survey	Mount Lemmon	5.161	0.043	7.2	4.942	5.381	6.5 km	–	catalog · MPC · JPL
(647293) 2008 SE_{221}	25 September 2008	Mount Lemmon Survey	Mount Lemmon	5.083	0.043	4.8	4.867	5.299	6.7 km	–	catalog · MPC · JPL
(647294) 2008 SC_{223}	25 September 2008	Mount Lemmon Survey	Mount Lemmon	5.293	0.031	18.4	5.127	5.459	6.9 km	–	catalog · MPC · JPL
(647295) 2008 SY_{230}	28 September 2008	Mount Lemmon Survey	Mount Lemmon	5.222	0.068	6.3	4.865	5.579	6.4 km	–	catalog · MPC · JPL
(647307) 2008 SY_{274}	22 September 2008	Spacewatch	Kitt Peak	5.271	0.033	6.5	5.098	5.444	7.4 km	–	catalog · MPC · JPL
(647308) 2008 SY_{275}	23 September 2008	Mount Lemmon Survey	Mount Lemmon	5.159	0.087	1.8	4.709	5.609	6.8 km	–	catalog · MPC · JPL
(647309) 2008 SE_{276}	23 September 2008	Mount Lemmon Survey	Mount Lemmon	5.258	0.071	20.8	4.882	5.633	8.2 km	–	catalog · MPC · JPL
(647310) 2008 SZ_{276}	24 September 2008	Mount Lemmon Survey	Mount Lemmon	5.286	0.068	7.5	4.928	5.643	7.3 km	–	catalog · MPC · JPL
(647311) 2008 SB_{277}	24 September 2008	Mount Lemmon Survey	Mount Lemmon	5.121	0.101	20.6	4.604	5.638	6.7 km	–	catalog · MPC · JPL
(647312) 2008 SP_{277}	24 September 2008	Spacewatch	Kitt Peak	5.342	0.049	7.6	5.079	5.605	7.2 km	–	catalog · MPC · JPL
(647345) 2008 SP_{332}	2 November 2010	Mount Lemmon Survey	Mount Lemmon	5.203	0.051	3.1	4.940	5.466	6.8 km	–	catalog · MPC · JPL
(647348) 2008 SN_{334}	16 February 2015	Pan-STARRS	Haleakala	5.172	0.059	16.8	4.866	5.478	7.9 km	–	catalog · MPC · JPL
(647349) 2008 SJ_{336}	8 November 2009	Mount Lemmon Survey	Mount Lemmon	5.288	0.064	11.3	4.951	5.625	7.5 km	–	catalog · MPC · JPL
(647357) 2008 SG_{340}	28 September 2008	Mount Lemmon Survey	Mount Lemmon	5.144	0.044	9.6	4.916	5.372	6.5 km	–	catalog · MPC · JPL
(647367) 2008 SH_{344}	25 September 2008	Mount Lemmon Survey	Mount Lemmon	5.185	0.095	31.7	4.692	5.677	7.9 km	–	catalog · MPC · JPL
(647368) 2008 SU_{346}	23 September 2008	Spacewatch	Kitt Peak	5.309	0.061	6.3	4.983	5.635	8.3 km	–	catalog · MPC · JPL
(647370) 2008 SF_{347}	22 September 2008	Mount Lemmon Survey	Mount Lemmon	5.262	0.059	9.3	4.950	5.575	7.2 km	–	catalog · MPC · JPL
(647372) 2008 SY_{347}	23 September 2008	Mount Lemmon Survey	Mount Lemmon	5.310	0.056	8.5	5.014	5.607	7.1 km	–	catalog · MPC · JPL
(647373) 2008 SA_{348}	20 September 2008	Mount Lemmon Survey	Mount Lemmon	5.326	0.097	28.1	4.810	5.842	7.9 km	–	catalog · MPC · JPL
(647406) 2008 TZ_{75}	2 October 2008	Mount Lemmon Survey	Mount Lemmon	5.270	0.085	3.3	4.823	5.717	6.8 km	–	catalog · MPC · JPL
(647417) 2008 TD_{117}	3 September 2008	Spacewatch	Kitt Peak	5.233	0.034	5.1	5.053	5.413	7.2 km	–	catalog · MPC · JPL
(647425) 2008 TR_{142}	9 October 2008	Mount Lemmon Survey	Mount Lemmon	5.246	0.080	5.1	4.825	5.668	6.2 km	–	catalog · MPC · JPL
(647474) 2008 TY_{217}	6 October 2008	Mount Lemmon Survey	Mount Lemmon	5.251	0.039	8.5	5.046	5.457	7.3 km	–	catalog · MPC · JPL
(647478) 2008 TW_{220}	1 October 2008	Mount Lemmon Survey	Mount Lemmon	5.183	0.124	8.1	4.540	5.826	6.0 km	–	catalog · MPC · JPL
(647480) 2008 TH_{222}	7 October 2008	Mount Lemmon Survey	Mount Lemmon	5.217	0.040	32.0	5.007	5.427	11 km	–	catalog · MPC · JPL
(647483) 2008 TK_{224}	2 October 2008	Spacewatch	Kitt Peak	5.238	0.136	16.8	4.524	5.951	6.7 km	–	catalog · MPC · JPL
(647485) 2008 TR_{227}	10 October 2008	Mount Lemmon Survey	Mount Lemmon	5.213	0.095	7.5	4.715	5.710	5.9 km	–	catalog · MPC · JPL
(647500) 2008 UP_{25}	10 October 2008	Spacewatch	Kitt Peak	5.215	0.081	7.3	4.792	5.639	6.4 km	–	catalog · MPC · JPL
(647518) 2008 UQ_{79}	23 September 2008	Spacewatch	Kitt Peak	5.351	0.043	4.5	5.122	5.581	6.5 km	–	catalog · MPC · JPL
(647567) 2008 UG_{253}	27 October 2008	Mount Lemmon Survey	Mount Lemmon	5.299	0.040	9.1	5.085	5.513	6.6 km	–	catalog · MPC · JPL
(647625) 2008 UO_{396}	27 December 2011	Mount Lemmon Survey	Mount Lemmon	5.146	0.059	12.9	4.843	5.449	7.2 km	–	catalog · MPC · JPL
(647627) 2008 UC_{397}	16 February 2015	Pan-STARRS	Haleakala	5.197	0.132	9.4	4.510	5.884	6.3 km	–	catalog · MPC · JPL
(647631) 2008 UQ_{400}	3 October 2008	Mount Lemmon Survey	Mount Lemmon	5.204	0.093	8.2	4.718	5.689	7.0 km	–	catalog · MPC · JPL
(647720) 2008 WC_{65}	9 October 2008	Spacewatch	Kitt Peak	5.200	0.069	3.6	4.840	5.561	6.2 km	–	catalog · MPC · JPL
(648210) 2009 RY_{35}	14 September 2009	Spacewatch	Kitt Peak	5.182	0.258	9.7	3.843	6.521	5.0 km	–	catalog · MPC · JPL
(648219) 2009 RE_{51}	6 September 2008	Mount Lemmon Survey	Mount Lemmon	5.213	0.155	0.5	4.406	6.021	5.6 km	–	catalog · MPC · JPL
(648222) 2009 RA_{64}	15 September 2009	Spacewatch	Kitt Peak	5.135	0.077	6.5	4.740	5.530	6.6 km	–	catalog · MPC · JPL
(648223) 2009 RG_{64}	15 September 2009	Spacewatch	Kitt Peak	5.162	0.146	1.3	4.409	5.915	6.1 km	–	catalog · MPC · JPL
(648229) 2009 RF_{80}	15 September 2009	Spacewatch	Kitt Peak	5.164	0.083	9.7	4.735	5.594	7.7 km	–	catalog · MPC · JPL
(648231) 2009 RE_{82}	15 September 2009	Spacewatch	Kitt Peak	5.189	0.137	6.7	4.478	5.901	5.4 km	–	catalog · MPC · JPL
(648232) 2009 RU_{82}	15 September 2009	Spacewatch	Kitt Peak	5.278	0.057	5.2	4.975	5.581	7.5 km	–	catalog · MPC · JPL
(648234) 2009 RN_{83}	15 September 2009	Spacewatch	Kitt Peak	5.204	0.111	6.6	4.627	5.781	5.6 km	–	catalog · MPC · JPL
(648256) 2009 SY_{66}	6 September 2008	Spacewatch	Kitt Peak	5.227	0.081	11.1	4.803	5.651	7.3 km	–	catalog · MPC · JPL
(648271) 2009 SE_{121}	18 September 2009	Spacewatch	Kitt Peak	5.166	0.094	3.4	4.682	5.650	6.0 km	–	catalog · MPC · JPL
(648276) 2009 ST_{129}	18 September 2009	Spacewatch	Kitt Peak	5.254	0.056	8.3	4.960	5.547	7.0 km	–	catalog · MPC · JPL
(648299) 2009 SV_{184}	6 September 2008	Mount Lemmon Survey	Mount Lemmon	5.233	0.102	7.8	4.702	5.765	5.7 km	–	catalog · MPC · JPL
(648301) 2009 SE_{188}	21 September 2009	Spacewatch	Kitt Peak	5.142	0.066	6.1	4.802	5.483	6.4 km	–	catalog · MPC · JPL
(648325) 2009 SN_{238}	16 September 2009	CSS	Catalina	5.211	0.204	15.4	4.151	6.272	8.4 km	–	catalog · MPC · JPL
(648329) 2009 SA_{247}	18 September 2009	Spacewatch	Kitt Peak	5.132	0.106	6.6	4.587	5.676	6.0 km	–	catalog · MPC · JPL
(648330) 2009 SY_{247}	21 September 2009	Mount Lemmon Survey	Mount Lemmon	5.053	0.045	6.0	4.824	5.282	7.3 km	–	catalog · MPC · JPL
(648332) 2009 SA_{254}	18 September 2009	Spacewatch	Kitt Peak	5.284	0.038	25.9	5.084	5.485	8.0 km	–	catalog · MPC · JPL
(648341) 2009 SK_{290}	21 September 2009	Spacewatch	Kitt Peak	5.284	0.041	33.0	5.069	5.499	7.9 km	–	catalog · MPC · JPL
(648348) 2009 SP_{321}	21 September 2009	Spacewatch	Kitt Peak	5.197	0.081	9.9	4.779	5.616	7.4 km	–	catalog · MPC · JPL
(648362) 2009 SA_{370}	21 September 2009	Mount Lemmon Survey	Mount Lemmon	5.163	0.115	4.5	4.570	5.756	7.0 km	–	catalog · MPC · JPL
(648383) 2009 SO_{404}	20 September 2009	Spacewatch	Kitt Peak	5.145	0.075	6.2	4.758	5.533	6.2 km	–	catalog · MPC · JPL
(648384) 2009 SL_{406}	17 September 2009	Spacewatch	Kitt Peak	5.186	0.029	6.2	5.038	5.334	6.6 km	–	catalog · MPC · JPL
(648388) 2009 SH_{419}	21 September 2009	Mount Lemmon Survey	Mount Lemmon	5.286	0.050	7.5	5.023	5.549	6.3 km	–	catalog · MPC · JPL
(648389) 2009 SL_{419}	21 September 2009	Mount Lemmon Survey	Mount Lemmon	5.214	0.071	7.8	4.842	5.586	6.7 km	–	catalog · MPC · JPL
(648390) 2009 SW_{419}	6 April 2002	Spacewatch	Kitt Peak	5.295	0.103	7.4	4.752	5.838	6.6 km	–	catalog · MPC · JPL
(648401) 2009 TT_{30}	15 October 2009	Mount Lemmon Survey	Mount Lemmon	5.218	0.100	25.1	4.694	5.742	8.1 km	–	catalog · MPC · JPL
(648410) 2009 TG_{54}	14 October 2009	Mount Lemmon Survey	Mount Lemmon	5.289	0.049	8.8	5.032	5.545	7.5 km	–	catalog · MPC · JPL
(648415) 2009 UW_{8}	16 October 2009	Mount Lemmon Survey	Mount Lemmon	5.158	0.087	9.8	4.711	5.605	6.4 km	–	catalog · MPC · JPL
(648430) 2009 UM_{56}	23 October 2009	Mount Lemmon Survey	Mount Lemmon	5.278	0.099	7.1	4.756	5.800	6.4 km	–	catalog · MPC · JPL
(648448) 2009 UF_{100}	23 October 2009	Mount Lemmon Survey	Mount Lemmon	5.240	0.014	31.9	5.165	5.315	11 km	–	catalog · MPC · JPL
(648458) 2009 UL_{126}	6 September 2008	Spacewatch	Kitt Peak	5.226	0.103	11.5	4.687	5.764	6.8 km	–	catalog · MPC · JPL
(648467) 2009 UD_{159}	18 September 2009	Spacewatch	Kitt Peak	5.193	0.091	6.4	4.720	5.667	6.4 km	–	catalog · MPC · JPL
(648468) 2009 UE_{159}	28 January 2015	Pan-STARRS	Haleakala	5.144	0.040	8.2	4.938	5.350	7.7 km	–	catalog · MPC · JPL
(648480) 2009 UU_{180}	22 October 2009	Mount Lemmon Survey	Mount Lemmon	5.168	0.096	8.3	4.674	5.661	6.5 km	–	catalog · MPC · JPL
(648484) 2009 UG_{189}	27 October 2009	Mount Lemmon Survey	Mount Lemmon	5.253	0.087	7.4	4.794	5.712	6.4 km	–	catalog · MPC · JPL
(648485) 2009 UT_{189}	24 October 2009	Spacewatch	Kitt Peak	5.145	0.091	6.4	4.677	5.612	5.5 km	–	catalog · MPC · JPL
(648486) 2009 VK_{4}	24 October 2009	Spacewatch	Kitt Peak	5.253	0.089	14.3	4.784	5.722	9.2 km	–	catalog · MPC · JPL
(648491) 2009 VD_{14}	29 September 2008	Spacewatch	Kitt Peak	5.265	0.055	2.6	4.975	5.556	6.1 km	–	catalog · MPC · JPL
(648500) 2009 VG_{34}	24 October 2009	Spacewatch	Kitt Peak	5.239	0.023	6.0	5.118	5.359	7.4 km	–	catalog · MPC · JPL
(648504) 2009 VZ_{53}	5 September 2008	Spacewatch	Kitt Peak	5.286	0.066	5.4	4.938	5.634	6.4 km	–	catalog · MPC · JPL
(648523) 2009 VX_{118}	8 November 2009	Mount Lemmon Survey	Mount Lemmon	5.127	0.040	3.4	4.920	5.335	6.1 km	–	catalog · MPC · JPL
(648530) 2009 VV_{128}	10 November 2009	Spacewatch	Kitt Peak	5.288	0.043	11.2	5.062	5.513	7.4 km	–	catalog · MPC · JPL
(648531) 2009 VF_{129}	11 November 2009	Spacewatch	Kitt Peak	5.233	0.074	5.5	4.844	5.623	6.1 km	–	catalog · MPC · JPL
(648538) 2009 WJ_{8}	1 October 2008	Mount Lemmon Survey	Mount Lemmon	5.270	0.130	7.1	4.583	5.956	6.1 km	–	catalog · MPC · JPL
(648544) 2009 WQ_{21}	18 November 2009	Mount Lemmon Survey	Mount Lemmon	5.260	0.029	11.9	5.109	5.412	8.5 km	–	catalog · MPC · JPL
(648556) 2009 WJ_{58}	22 October 2009	Mount Lemmon Survey	Mount Lemmon	5.205	0.036	15.4	5.017	5.393	7.8 km	–	catalog · MPC · JPL
(648564) 2009 WT_{67}	21 September 2008	Spacewatch	Kitt Peak	5.239	0.047	12.8	4.995	5.483	7.2 km	–	catalog · MPC · JPL
(648596) 2009 WO_{137}	16 November 2009	Mount Lemmon Survey	Mount Lemmon	5.282	0.094	8.4	4.785	5.778	7.3 km	–	catalog · MPC · JPL
(648611) 2009 WV_{154}	7 September 2008	Mount Lemmon Survey	Mount Lemmon	5.325	0.024	12.3	5.197	5.453	9.5 km	–	catalog · MPC · JPL
(648620) 2009 WL_{190}	23 August 2007	Spacewatch	Kitt Peak	5.206	0.081	2.7	4.787	5.625	7.1 km	–	catalog · MPC · JPL
(648633) 2009 WY_{218}	22 September 2009	Mount Lemmon Survey	Mount Lemmon	5.247	0.108	4.4	4.679	5.816	6.0 km	–	catalog · MPC · JPL
(648636) 2009 WQ_{226}	17 November 2009	Mount Lemmon Survey	Mount Lemmon	5.206	0.049	4.1	4.948	5.463	5.8 km	–	catalog · MPC · JPL
(648638) 2009 WK_{230}	17 November 2009	Mount Lemmon Survey	Mount Lemmon	5.155	0.008	8.4	5.114	5.196	6.8 km	–	catalog · MPC · JPL
(648667) 2009 WY_{288}	24 November 2009	Mount Lemmon Survey	Mount Lemmon	5.213	0.104	17.1	4.671	5.756	6.3 km	–	catalog · MPC · JPL
(648669) 2009 WZ_{293}	18 November 2009	Spacewatch	Kitt Peak	5.263	0.060	13.5	4.946	5.581	7.0 km	–	catalog · MPC · JPL
(648672) 2009 WB_{299}	16 November 2009	Mount Lemmon Survey	Mount Lemmon	5.209	0.008	7.3	5.167	5.251	6.9 km	–	catalog · MPC · JPL
(648677) 2009 XX_{11}	8 October 2008	Spacewatch	Kitt Peak	5.291	0.041	6.4	5.075	5.506	8.3 km	–	catalog · MPC · JPL
(649014) 2010 TW_{221}	13 October 2010	Mount Lemmon Survey	Mount Lemmon	5.178	0.128	15.0	4.517	5.839	7.0 km	–	catalog · MPC · JPL
(649015) 2010 TY_{221}	13 October 2010	Mount Lemmon Survey	Mount Lemmon	5.172	0.114	14.9	4.581	5.762	7.7 km	–	catalog · MPC · JPL
(649078) 2010 VH_{109}	6 November 2010	Mount Lemmon Survey	Mount Lemmon	5.205	0.058	7.4	4.900	5.509	7.1 km	–	catalog · MPC · JPL
(649092) 2010 VM_{163}	10 November 2010	Spacewatch	Kitt Peak	5.215	0.053	3.7	4.941	5.490	6.4 km	–	catalog · MPC · JPL
(649099) 2010 VT_{185}	30 October 2010	Mount Lemmon Survey	Mount Lemmon	5.150	0.108	7.7	4.596	5.705	6.2 km	–	catalog · MPC · JPL
(649122) 2010 VS_{253}	1 November 2010	Spacewatch	Kitt Peak	5.238	0.105	21.5	4.688	5.788	8.9 km	–	catalog · MPC · JPL
(649124) 2010 VW_{257}	3 November 2010	Spacewatch	Kitt Peak	5.218	0.124	7.7	4.568	5.867	6.6 km	–	catalog · MPC · JPL
(649125) 2010 VC_{263}	10 November 2010	Mount Lemmon Survey	Mount Lemmon	5.254	0.081	10.0	4.830	5.679	7.0 km	–	catalog · MPC · JPL
(649128) 2010 VJ_{270}	11 November 2010	Mount Lemmon Survey	Mount Lemmon	5.253	0.085	1.8	4.808	5.697	6.0 km	–	catalog · MPC · JPL
(649136) 2010 WB_{30}	27 November 2010	Mount Lemmon Survey	Mount Lemmon	5.260	0.053	3.8	4.981	5.538	5.9 km	–	catalog · MPC · JPL
(649163) 2010 XT_{52}	21 September 2009	Mount Lemmon Survey	Mount Lemmon	5.137	0.189	5.4	4.165	6.109	5.4 km	–	catalog · MPC · JPL
(649168) 2010 XD_{56}	12 November 2010	R. Holmes	Charleston	5.218	0.080	27.0	4.803	5.633	7.5 km	–	catalog · MPC · JPL
(649169) 2010 XS_{66}	24 September 2008	Mount Lemmon Survey	Mount Lemmon	5.147	0.073	8.2	4.772	5.523	7.0 km	–	catalog · MPC · JPL
(649178) 2010 XR_{113}	3 December 2010	Mount Lemmon Survey	Mount Lemmon	5.075	0.117	3.0	4.483	5.668	5.1 km	–	catalog · MPC · JPL
(649181) 2010 XK_{119}	2 December 2010	Mount Lemmon Survey	Mount Lemmon	5.262	0.044	8.0	5.033	5.492	6.2 km	–	catalog · MPC · JPL
(649397) 2011 EB_{106}	28 February 2014	Pan-STARRS	Haleakala	5.267	0.059	5.1	4.956	5.577	6.9 km	–	catalog · MPC · JPL
(650120) 2011 WO_{113}	16 November 2011	Spacewatch	Kitt Peak	5.155	0.074	30.3	4.773	5.538	10 km	–	catalog · MPC · JPL
(650121) 2011 WQ_{113}	25 November 2011	Pan-STARRS	Haleakala	5.164	0.085	5.2	4.724	5.605	7.7 km	–	catalog · MPC · JPL
(650135) 2011 WS_{157}	5 January 2013	Mount Lemmon Survey	Mount Lemmon	5.175	0.099	4.0	4.662	5.687	7.1 km	–	catalog · MPC · JPL
(650157) 2011 YW_{43}	22 September 2009	Spacewatch	Kitt Peak	5.215	0.133	5.9	4.520	5.910	6.5 km	–	catalog · MPC · JPL
(650158) 2011 YG_{44}	27 December 2011	Spacewatch	Kitt Peak	5.248	0.052	12.0	4.974	5.522	7.0 km	–	catalog · MPC · JPL
(650161) 2011 YO_{57}	29 December 2011	Spacewatch	Kitt Peak	5.220	0.013	18.7	5.155	5.286	8.0 km	–	catalog · MPC · JPL
(650177) 2012 AT_{21}	1 January 2012	Mount Lemmon Survey	Mount Lemmon	5.270	0.034	12.0	5.092	5.449	6.8 km	–	catalog · MPC · JPL
(650179) 2012 AJ_{31}	2 January 2012	Mount Lemmon Survey	Mount Lemmon	5.238	0.084	6.7	4.796	5.680	6.6 km	–	catalog · MPC · JPL
(650180) 2012 AD_{33}	2 January 2012	Spacewatch	Kitt Peak	5.332	0.034	15.0	5.152	5.511	7.2 km	–	catalog · MPC · JPL
(650184) 2012 AB_{36}	2 January 2012	Mount Lemmon Survey	Mount Lemmon	5.236	0.155	9.7	4.423	6.049	5.9 km	–	catalog · MPC · JPL
(650188) 2012 BL_{7}	6 September 2008	Spacewatch	Kitt Peak	5.277	0.057	1.2	4.975	5.579	6.7 km	–	catalog · MPC · JPL
(650190) 2012 BF_{36}	19 January 2012	Mount Lemmon Survey	Mount Lemmon	5.237	0.061	7.6	4.919	5.554	6.9 km	–	catalog · MPC · JPL
(650193) 2012 BH_{60}	11 November 2009	Spacewatch	Kitt Peak	5.295	0.074	18.2	4.903	5.686	7.2 km	–	catalog · MPC · JPL
(650194) 2012 BM_{60}	1 October 2008	Mount Lemmon Survey	Mount Lemmon	5.193	0.092	13.4	4.717	5.669	6.6 km	–	catalog · MPC · JPL
(650195) 2012 BP_{60}	24 January 2012	Pan-STARRS	Haleakala	5.290	0.140	17.5	4.550	6.030	8.3 km	–	catalog · MPC · JPL
(650212) 2012 BP_{97}	27 October 2009	Mount Lemmon Survey	Mount Lemmon	5.270	0.051	13.8	5.003	5.537	7.1 km	–	catalog · MPC · JPL
(650217) 2012 BR_{123}	2 October 2008	Mount Lemmon Survey	Mount Lemmon	5.245	0.073	14.5	4.863	5.626	9.5 km	–	catalog · MPC · JPL
(650219) 2012 BW_{133}	3 April 2008	Mount Lemmon Survey	Mount Lemmon	5.121	0.063	38.3	4.798	5.443	13 km	–	catalog · MPC · JPL
(650227) 2012 BC_{155}	4 December 2010	Mount Lemmon Survey	Mount Lemmon	5.184	0.026	7.2	5.051	5.317	6.3 km	–	catalog · MPC · JPL
(650228) 2012 BG_{155}	19 June 2015	Pan-STARRS	Haleakala	5.299	0.006	4.4	5.265	5.332	6.3 km	–	catalog · MPC · JPL
(650230) 2012 BF_{186}	26 January 2012	Mount Lemmon Survey	Mount Lemmon	5.235	0.135	9.8	4.529	5.941	5.8 km	–	catalog · MPC · JPL
(650233) 2012 BH_{188}	26 January 2012	Mount Lemmon Survey	Mount Lemmon	5.161	0.033	3.5	4.989	5.333	6.2 km	–	catalog · MPC · JPL
(650237) 2012 CG_{17}	3 February 2012	Pan-STARRS	Haleakala	5.218	0.021	6.1	5.107	5.330	6.0 km	–	catalog · MPC · JPL
(650254) 2012 CU_{57}	7 October 2008	Mount Lemmon Survey	Mount Lemmon	5.236	0.093	8.9	4.748	5.724	7.3 km	–	catalog · MPC · JPL
(650985) 2012 UL_{166}	30 December 2011	Mount Lemmon Survey	Mount Lemmon	5.178	0.053	27.8	4.903	5.454	12 km	–	catalog · MPC · JPL
(651317) 2012 YQ_{9}	24 September 2009	Spacewatch	Kitt Peak	5.157	0.071	16.0	4.793	5.521	7.4 km	–	catalog · MPC · JPL
(651362) 2013 AT_{36}	20 October 2012	Mount Lemmon Survey	Mount Lemmon	5.091	0.095	26.1	4.610	5.573	8.2 km	–	catalog · MPC · JPL
(651373) 2013 AQ_{55}	6 January 2013	Spacewatch	Kitt Peak	5.176	0.062	9.5	4.854	5.498	7.1 km	–	catalog · MPC · JPL
(651409) 2013 AZ_{103}	6 January 2013	Spacewatch	Kitt Peak	5.225	0.060	25.5	4.913	5.537	10 km	–	catalog · MPC · JPL
(651431) 2013 AQ_{132}	12 December 1998	Spacewatch	Kitt Peak	5.252	0.093	12.1	4.765	5.740	9.2 km	–	catalog · MPC · JPL
(651432) 2013 AF_{133}	6 January 2013	Spacewatch	Kitt Peak	5.153	0.107	21.0	4.603	5.704	7.1 km	–	catalog · MPC · JPL
(651433) 2013 AO_{133}	9 January 2013	Spacewatch	Kitt Peak	5.245	0.056	7.6	4.952	5.538	7.8 km	–	catalog · MPC · JPL
(651470) 2013 AH_{203}	10 January 2013	Pan-STARRS	Haleakala	5.126	0.077	8.7	4.732	5.520	6.1 km	–	catalog · MPC · JPL
(651480) 2013 BB_{17}	2 November 2010	Mount Lemmon Survey	Mount Lemmon	5.208	0.096	7.9	4.707	5.709	6.5 km	–	catalog · MPC · JPL
(651498) 2013 BZ_{58}	19 September 1998	SDSS Collaboration	Apache Point	5.146	0.050	17.6	4.888	5.404	8.3 km	–	catalog · MPC · JPL
(651501) 2013 BV_{60}	7 January 2013	Spacewatch	Kitt Peak	5.131	0.086	23.6	4.690	5.572	8.3 km	–	catalog · MPC · JPL
(651515) 2013 BO_{91}	14 January 2013	ESA OGS	ESA OGS	5.278	0.070	18.6	4.907	5.649	9.2 km	–	catalog · MPC · JPL
(651519) 2013 BR_{96}	17 January 2013	Spacewatch	Kitt Peak	5.156	0.089	10.0	4.698	5.613	7.3 km	–	catalog · MPC · JPL
(651538) 2013 CS_{39}	27 September 2009	Mount Lemmon Survey	Mount Lemmon	5.316	0.044	10.3	5.080	5.552	8.6 km	–	catalog · MPC · JPL
(651544) 2013 CY_{48}	17 January 2013	Pan-STARRS	Haleakala	5.168	0.030	11.1	5.010	5.325	7.5 km	–	catalog · MPC · JPL
(651551) 2013 CC_{61}	21 April 2004	Spacewatch	Kitt Peak	5.211	0.052	15.8	4.940	5.482	10 km	–	catalog · MPC · JPL
(651561) 2013 CS_{78}	5 January 2013	Mount Lemmon Survey	Mount Lemmon	5.191	0.070	25.8	4.828	5.554	8.3 km	–	catalog · MPC · JPL
(651563) 2013 CZ_{80}	8 February 2013	Pan-STARRS	Haleakala	5.222	0.052	21.4	4.949	5.495	8.5 km	–	catalog · MPC · JPL
(651569) 2013 CO_{93}	6 February 2002	R. Millis; M. W. Buie	Kitt Peak	5.161	0.036	8.2	4.973	5.350	6.5 km	–	catalog · MPC · JPL
(651579) 2013 CM_{105}	9 February 2013	Pan-STARRS	Haleakala	5.216	0.074	15.1	4.831	5.601	6.6 km	–	catalog · MPC · JPL
(651604) 2013 CE_{140}	20 January 2013	Spacewatch	Kitt Peak	5.255	0.064	18.0	4.917	5.592	8.0 km	–	catalog · MPC · JPL
(651608) 2013 CU_{145}	14 February 2013	Spacewatch	Kitt Peak	5.301	0.068	14.9	4.940	5.662	8.1 km	–	catalog · MPC · JPL
(651609) 2013 CV_{146}	2 January 2012	Spacewatch	Kitt Peak	5.266	0.047	8.6	5.017	5.515	6.7 km	–	catalog · MPC · JPL
(651618) 2013 CT_{160}	9 October 2008	Spacewatch	Kitt Peak	5.188	0.103	18.3	4.652	5.724	6.6 km	–	catalog · MPC · JPL
(651623) 2013 CM_{170}	23 September 2008	Spacewatch	Kitt Peak	5.279	0.069	6.1	4.913	5.646	7.9 km	–	catalog · MPC · JPL
(651633) 2013 CR_{193}	3 December 2010	Mount Lemmon Survey	Mount Lemmon	5.259	0.046	7.4	5.019	5.499	7.9 km	–	catalog · MPC · JPL
(651634) 2013 CR_{194}	1 February 2013	Spacewatch	Kitt Peak	5.113	0.060	12.0	4.808	5.418	6.9 km	–	catalog · MPC · JPL
(651635) 2013 CB_{197}	28 January 2012	Pan-STARRS	Haleakala	5.245	0.085	22.1	4.798	5.691	6.6 km	–	catalog · MPC · JPL
(651637) 2013 CN_{200}	28 September 2008	Mount Lemmon Survey	Mount Lemmon	5.306	0.025	8.3	5.176	5.437	7.3 km	–	catalog · MPC · JPL
(651650) 2013 CO_{218}	6 December 2010	Mount Lemmon Survey	Mount Lemmon	5.169	0.125	3.8	4.523	5.816	5.7 km	–	catalog · MPC · JPL
(651664) 2013 CG_{245}	14 February 2013	Pan-STARRS	Haleakala	5.172	0.179	16.7	4.246	6.097	5.7 km	–	catalog · MPC · JPL
(651665) 2013 CA_{249}	8 February 2013	Pan-STARRS	Haleakala	5.155	0.095	9.5	4.663	5.646	6.6 km	–	catalog · MPC · JPL
(651667) 2013 CV_{251}	8 February 2013	Pan-STARRS	Haleakala	5.252	0.030	7.4	5.096	5.407	6.7 km	–	catalog · MPC · JPL
(651673) 2013 CO_{255}	23 October 2009	Mount Lemmon Survey	Mount Lemmon	5.207	0.036	8.6	5.021	5.393	6.6 km	–	catalog · MPC · JPL
(651678) 2013 CF_{259}	14 February 2013	CSS	Catalina	5.184	0.223	13.5	4.027	6.341	6.7 km	–	catalog · MPC · JPL
(651685) 2013 DL_{5}	1 January 2012	Mount Lemmon Survey	Mount Lemmon	5.267	0.070	0.3	4.898	5.637	6.4 km	–	catalog · MPC · JPL
(651687) 2013 DY_{7}	5 September 2008	Spacewatch	Kitt Peak	5.140	0.015	19.3	5.063	5.217	7.9 km	–	catalog · MPC · JPL
(651726) 2013 EW_{61}	8 March 2013	Pan-STARRS	Haleakala	5.163	0.064	6.5	4.833	5.493	5.8 km	–	catalog · MPC · JPL
(651732) 2013 EZ_{75}	13 September 2007	Mount Lemmon Survey	Mount Lemmon	5.262	0.031	6.2	5.101	5.423	7.4 km	–	catalog · MPC · JPL
(651754) 2013 EK_{131}	14 February 2013	Spacewatch	Kitt Peak	5.164	0.061	11.0	4.850	5.479	5.6 km	–	catalog · MPC · JPL
(651757) 2013 EH_{141}	18 January 2013	Mount Lemmon Survey	Mount Lemmon	5.175	0.020	9.4	5.073	5.276	6.2 km	–	catalog · MPC · JPL
(651758) 2013 EA_{146}	7 September 2008	Mount Lemmon Survey	Mount Lemmon	5.140	0.093	6.9	4.660	5.620	7.4 km	–	catalog · MPC · JPL
(651762) 2013 EB_{175}	2 March 2013	Mount Lemmon Survey	Mount Lemmon	5.186	0.056	7.0	4.894	5.478	6.1 km	–	catalog · MPC · JPL
(652323) 2013 YG_{32}	3 September 2008	Spacewatch	Kitt Peak	5.143	0.071	8.6	4.780	5.506	9.9 km	–	catalog · MPC · JPL
(652478) 2014 BY_{37}	23 January 2014	Mount Lemmon Survey	Mount Lemmon	5.205	0.083	20.0	4.771	5.640	6.7 km	–	catalog · MPC · JPL
(652532) 2014 CR_{23}	9 February 2014	Pan-STARRS	Haleakala	5.238	0.034	10.9	5.062	5.414	7.2 km	–	catalog · MPC · JPL
(652539) 2014 CM_{32}	10 February 2014	Pan-STARRS	Haleakala	5.163	0.076	24.6	4.770	5.555	8.8 km	–	catalog · MPC · JPL
(652545) 2014 DE_{6}	30 September 2010	Mount Lemmon Survey	Mount Lemmon	5.162	0.017	23.7	5.076	5.248	9.5 km	–	catalog · MPC · JPL
(652580) 2014 DH_{56}	24 November 2000	La Silla Obs.	La Silla	5.191	0.032	4.5	5.027	5.355	6.9 km	–	catalog · MPC · JPL
(652587) 2014 DB_{67}	26 February 2014	Pan-STARRS	Haleakala	5.348	0.044	9.4	5.111	5.585	7.3 km	–	catalog · MPC · JPL
(652590) 2014 DL_{68}	24 October 2009	Spacewatch	Kitt Peak	5.251	0.053	8.6	4.974	5.528	7.8 km	–	catalog · MPC · JPL
(652594) 2014 DM_{71}	7 October 2008	Mount Lemmon Survey	Mount Lemmon	5.250	0.025	8.8	5.120	5.381	7.6 km	–	catalog · MPC · JPL
(652599) 2014 DM_{73}	2 January 2012	Spacewatch	Kitt Peak	5.212	0.019	8.6	5.114	5.310	7.3 km	–	catalog · MPC · JPL
(652639) 2014 DW_{136}	28 February 2014	Pan-STARRS	Haleakala	5.192	0.034	7.0	5.017	5.368	6.5 km	–	catalog · MPC · JPL
(652644) 2014 DX_{143}	2 September 2008	Spacewatch	Kitt Peak	5.156	0.060	7.6	4.848	5.465	5.4 km	–	catalog · MPC · JPL
(652674) 2014 DF_{181}	7 April 2002	M. W. Buie; A. B. Jordan	Cerro Tololo	5.180	0.057	8.1	4.883	5.476	6.6 km	–	catalog · MPC · JPL
(652675) 2014 DJ_{181}	26 February 2014	Pan-STARRS	Haleakala	5.227	0.014	19.4	5.156	5.298	6.2 km	–	catalog · MPC · JPL
(652678) 2014 DA_{190}	26 February 2014	Mount Lemmon Survey	Mount Lemmon	5.278	0.044	24.5	5.046	5.510	6.7 km	–	catalog · MPC · JPL
(652683) 2014 EE_{3}	5 September 2008	Spacewatch	Kitt Peak	5.220	0.004	31.2	5.197	5.243	8.1 km	–	catalog · MPC · JPL
(652687) 2014 EX_{18}	9 February 2014	Pan-STARRS	Haleakala	5.168	0.090	28.2	4.705	5.632	8.0 km	–	catalog · MPC · JPL
(652702) 2014 ET_{37}	23 September 2009	Mount Lemmon Survey	Mount Lemmon	5.313	0.052	19.0	5.038	5.589	10 km	–	catalog · MPC · JPL
(652721) 2014 EM_{66}	14 April 2016	Pan-STARRS	Haleakala	5.297	0.055	14.8	5.007	5.586	7.2 km	–	catalog · MPC · JPL
(652725) 2014 EC_{68}	17 January 2013	Pan-STARRS	Haleakala	5.136	0.100	3.9	4.623	5.648	5.4 km	–	catalog · MPC · JPL
(652741) 2014 EV_{102}	12 November 2010	Mount Lemmon Survey	Mount Lemmon	5.242	0.086	7.7	4.791	5.694	5.9 km	–	catalog · MPC · JPL
(652747) 2014 EL_{114}	13 November 2010	Spacewatch	Kitt Peak	5.267	0.025	6.9	5.134	5.400	6.7 km	–	catalog · MPC · JPL
(652750) 2014 EL_{118}	18 April 2015	CTIO-DECam	Cerro Tololo-DECam	5.195	0.108	8.7	4.635	5.755	6.3 km	–	catalog · MPC · JPL
(652761) 2014 EV_{147}	17 September 2009	Spacewatch	Kitt Peak	5.172	0.037	7.1	4.979	5.364	6.9 km	–	catalog · MPC · JPL
(652763) 2014 EL_{155}	10 January 2013	Pan-STARRS	Haleakala	5.135	0.020	6.8	5.033	5.236	7.2 km	–	catalog · MPC · JPL
(652766) 2014 EX_{156}	28 February 2014	Pan-STARRS	Haleakala	5.197	0.151	15.2	4.411	5.982	6.5 km	–	catalog · MPC · JPL
(652767) 2014 EL_{158}	18 April 2015	CTIO-DECam	Cerro Tololo-DECam	5.265	0.086	14.1	4.814	5.716	5.5 km	–	catalog · MPC · JPL
(652778) 2014 EZ_{180}	7 November 2010	Mount Lemmon Survey	Mount Lemmon	5.277	0.092	7.9	4.794	5.761	6.2 km	–	catalog · MPC · JPL
(652798) 2014 EH_{222}	2 March 2014	CTIO-DECam	Cerro Tololo-DECam	5.098	0.081	7.7	4.684	5.512	5.3 km	–	catalog · MPC · JPL
(652810) 2014 EW_{253}	12 November 2010	Mount Lemmon Survey	Mount Lemmon	5.195	0.050	9.7	4.935	5.455	7.5 km	–	catalog · MPC · JPL
(652818) 2014 FW_{2}	12 March 2014	Mount Lemmon Survey	Mount Lemmon	5.224	0.122	12.6	4.587	5.861	8.5 km	–	catalog · MPC · JPL
(652865) 2014 FZ_{51}	22 February 2014	Mount Lemmon Survey	Mount Lemmon	5.199	0.085	25.8	4.755	5.643	8.2 km	–	catalog · MPC · JPL
(652868) 2014 FG_{61}	27 September 2009	Spacewatch	Kitt Peak	5.237	0.107	7.5	4.674	5.799	6.2 km	–	catalog · MPC · JPL
(652894) 2014 GN_{10}	11 September 2007	Mount Lemmon Survey	Mount Lemmon	5.208	0.027	6.6	5.067	5.348	8.6 km	–	catalog · MPC · JPL
(652945) 2014 HJ_{11}	22 September 2008	Spacewatch	Kitt Peak	5.205	0.031	24.1	5.046	5.364	8.3 km	–	catalog · MPC · JPL
(653060) 2014 HJ_{211}	26 February 2014	Pan-STARRS	Haleakala	5.267	0.010	27.8	5.214	5.321	7.8 km	–	catalog · MPC · JPL
(653188) 2014 KH_{85}	22 January 2013	Mount Lemmon Survey	Mount Lemmon	5.238	0.073	11.9	4.853	5.623	11 km	–	catalog · MPC · JPL
(654570) 2015 BM_{521}	10 September 2007	Mount Lemmon Survey	Mount Lemmon	5.209	0.047	14.1	4.966	5.453	6.9 km	–	catalog · MPC · JPL
(654644) 2015 CR_{59}	19 April 2004	Spacewatch	Kitt Peak	5.107	0.078	8.0	4.709	5.505	7.8 km	–	catalog · MPC · JPL
(654717) 2015 DO_{136}	23 December 2012	Pan-STARRS	Haleakala	5.146	0.008	17.9	5.102	5.189	7.1 km	–	catalog · MPC · JPL
(654769) 2015 DS_{225}	16 February 2015	Pan-STARRS	Haleakala	5.221	0.045	15.1	4.987	5.455	7.3 km	–	catalog · MPC · JPL
(654845) 2015 ET_{60}	15 March 2015	Pan-STARRS	Haleakala	5.150	0.112	19.5	4.571	5.728	7.9 km	–	catalog · MPC · JPL
(654878) 2015 FG_{69}	12 December 2012	Mount Lemmon Survey	Mount Lemmon	5.195	0.146	20.5	4.438	5.952	7.4 km	–	catalog · MPC · JPL
(654905) 2015 FO_{109}	4 September 2008	Spacewatch	Kitt Peak	5.114	0.048	7.4	4.868	5.359	6.4 km	–	catalog · MPC · JPL
(654907) 2015 FK_{111}	20 March 2015	Pan-STARRS	Haleakala	5.281	0.023	12.5	5.157	5.405	7.3 km	–	catalog · MPC · JPL
(654924) 2015 FA_{143}	20 September 2009	Spacewatch	Kitt Peak	5.242	0.069	8.7	4.882	5.603	8.1 km	–	catalog · MPC · JPL
(654952) 2015 FB_{175}	16 November 2009	Mount Lemmon Survey	Mount Lemmon	5.204	0.033	17.6	5.032	5.376	7.1 km	–	catalog · MPC · JPL
(655056) 2015 FM_{359}	2 October 2008	Spacewatch	Kitt Peak	5.246	0.086	17.1	4.795	5.696	7.6 km	–	catalog · MPC · JPL
(655060) 2015 FH_{361}	17 March 2015	Pan-STARRS	Haleakala	5.232	0.055	9.3	4.943	5.521	7.2 km	–	catalog · MPC · JPL
(655074) 2015 FR_{388}	28 October 2010	Mount Lemmon Survey	Mount Lemmon	5.267	0.023	6.1	5.143	5.390	8.2 km	–	catalog · MPC · JPL
(655079) 2015 FT_{391}	20 March 2015	Pan-STARRS	Haleakala	5.240	0.050	6.6	4.980	5.500	6.9 km	–	catalog · MPC · JPL
(655095) 2015 FS_{439}	21 March 2015	Pan-STARRS	Haleakala	5.208	0.006	35.5	5.175	5.241	7.4 km	–	catalog · MPC · JPL
(655120) 2015 GC_{26}	11 November 2010	Spacewatch	Kitt Peak	5.231	0.068	20.8	4.877	5.586	8.6 km	–	catalog · MPC · JPL
(655140) 2015 GH_{67}	3 February 2000	Spacewatch	Kitt Peak	5.292	0.029	12.8	5.139	5.445	7.6 km	–	catalog · MPC · JPL
(655259) 2015 HC_{172}	8 February 2002	Spacewatch	Kitt Peak	5.181	0.204	6.7	4.123	6.238	6.8 km	–	catalog · MPC · JPL
(655283) 2015 HM_{218}	20 April 2015	Pan-STARRS	Haleakala	5.205	0.013	10.1	5.139	5.271	6.9 km	–	catalog · MPC · JPL
(655290) 2015 HU_{247}	19 April 2015	CTIO-DECam	Cerro Tololo-DECam	5.248	0.078	9.6	4.840	5.655	5.3 km	–	catalog · MPC · JPL
(655303) 2015 HC_{355}	18 April 2015	CTIO-DECam	Cerro Tololo-DECam	5.274	0.064	15.9	4.935	5.613	6.6 km	–	catalog · MPC · JPL
(655316) 2015 JJ_{21}	11 May 2015	Mount Lemmon Survey	Mount Lemmon	5.158	0.119	22.6	4.545	5.772	9.1 km	–	catalog · MPC · JPL
(655477) 2015 MF_{43}	15 December 2010	Mount Lemmon Survey	Mount Lemmon	5.172	0.117	13.5	4.570	5.775	7.6 km	–	catalog · MPC · JPL
(655554) 2015 NF_{38}	14 February 2013	Pan-STARRS	Haleakala	5.259	0.077	19.8	4.854	5.664	6.7 km	–	catalog · MPC · JPL
(657066) 2016 GZ_{187}	18 February 2014	Mount Lemmon Survey	Mount Lemmon	5.149	0.021	8.0	5.041	5.258	6.9 km	–	catalog · MPC · JPL
(657077) 2016 GH_{215}	6 February 2002	R. Millis; M. W. Buie	Kitt Peak	5.154	0.105	25.1	4.614	5.694	7.5 km	–	catalog · MPC · JPL
(657114) 2016 GN_{278}	5 April 2016	Pan-STARRS	Haleakala	5.133	0.039	8.1	4.935	5.332	6.5 km	–	catalog · MPC · JPL
(657210) 2016 MQ_{2}	7 March 2014	Spacewatch	Kitt Peak	5.241	0.064	7.2	4.908	5.574	6.9 km	–	catalog · MPC · JPL
(659000) 2018 LB_{25}	15 June 2018	Pan-STARRS	Haleakala	5.245	0.044	13.2	5.012	5.478	6.6 km	–	catalog · MPC · JPL
(659011) 2018 NW_{24}	12 July 2018	Pan-STARRS	Haleakala	5.231	0.050	19.4	4.970	5.492	6.2 km	–	catalog · MPC · JPL
(659012) 2018 NR_{26}	8 July 2018	Pan-STARRS	Haleakala	5.165	0.069	12.9	4.811	5.519	6.3 km	–	catalog · MPC · JPL
(659013) 2018 NB_{28}	24 April 2014	CTIO-DECam	Cerro Tololo-DECam	5.257	0.103	14.6	4.717	5.797	5.8 km	–	catalog · MPC · JPL
(659014) 2018 NZ_{38}	4 December 2010	Mount Lemmon Survey	Mount Lemmon	5.258	0.087	8.0	4.803	5.713	6.1 km	–	catalog · MPC · JPL
(659020) 2018 PP_{11}	18 April 2015	CTIO-DECam	Cerro Tololo-DECam	5.190	0.036	8.8	5.001	5.379	6.2 km	–	catalog · MPC · JPL
(659022) 2018 PG_{43}	5 August 2018	Pan-STARRS	Haleakala	5.280	0.013	8.5	5.211	5.348	6.8 km	–	catalog · MPC · JPL
(659522) 2019 LC_{4}	3 November 2010	Mount Lemmon Survey	Mount Lemmon	5.172	0.079	26.3	4.765	5.580	9.0 km	–	catalog · MPC · JPL
(659526) 2019 ME_{17}	30 June 2019	Pan-STARRS	Haleakala	5.245	0.089	14.5	4.779	5.711	7.0 km	–	catalog · MPC · JPL
(659529) 2019 NY_{7}	1 July 2019	Pan-STARRS	Haleakala	5.135	0.041	8.3	4.923	5.347	5.6 km	–	catalog · MPC · JPL
(659530) 2019 NK_{8}	27 February 2014	Mount Lemmon Survey	Mount Lemmon	5.145	0.033	1.8	4.976	5.315	7.0 km	–	catalog · MPC · JPL
(659531) 2019 NO_{8}	24 January 2012	Pan-STARRS	Haleakala	5.240	0.114	28.3	4.641	5.840	6.9 km	–	catalog · MPC · JPL
(659532) 2019 NB_{9}	7 September 2008	Mount Lemmon Survey	Mount Lemmon	5.149	0.097	5.5	4.648	5.650	6.0 km	–	catalog · MPC · JPL
(659533) 2019 NX_{9}	5 February 2013	Spacewatch	Kitt Peak	5.163	0.091	11.3	4.694	5.632	6.0 km	–	catalog · MPC · JPL
(659534) 2019 NR_{13}	27 November 2010	Mount Lemmon Survey	Mount Lemmon	5.166	0.101	0.7	4.643	5.688	5.1 km	–	catalog · MPC · JPL
(659538) 2019 NV_{36}	1 July 2019	Pan-STARRS	Haleakala	5.168	0.095	14.3	4.679	5.657	6.7 km	–	catalog · MPC · JPL
(659539) 2019 NC_{37}	10 July 2019	Pan-STARRS	Haleakala	5.158	0.116	10.5	4.559	5.756	6.6 km	–	catalog · MPC · JPL
(659543) 2019 NK_{38}	7 July 2019	Pan-STARRS	Haleakala	5.244	0.206	8.2	4.164	6.324	5.9 km	–	catalog · MPC · JPL
(659544) 2019 NJ_{46}	4 July 2019	Pan-STARRS	Haleakala	5.264	0.161	11.0	4.417	6.110	7.0 km	–	catalog · MPC · JPL
(659545) 2019 NX_{51}	19 April 2015	CTIO-DECam	Cerro Tololo-DECam	5.186	0.091	8.8	4.716	5.657	6.0 km	–	catalog · MPC · JPL
(659546) 2019 NY_{51}	17 April 2015	CTIO-DECam	Cerro Tololo-DECam	5.184	0.093	9.0	4.700	5.669	5.7 km	–	catalog · MPC · JPL
(659548) 2019 NO_{64}	1 July 2019	Pan-STARRS	Haleakala	5.227	0.026	6.2	5.094	5.361	5.3 km	–	catalog · MPC · JPL
(659555) 2019 OG_{8}	19 January 2013	Mount Lemmon Survey	Mount Lemmon	5.105	0.056	2.3	4.818	5.392	6.4 km	–	catalog · MPC · JPL
(659566) 2019 OW_{24}	28 July 2019	Pan-STARRS	Haleakala	5.204	0.119	15.6	4.582	5.826	6.8 km	–	catalog · MPC · JPL
(659567) 2019 ON_{26}	30 June 2019	Pan-STARRS	Haleakala	5.182	0.106	21.2	4.635	5.729	6.5 km	–	catalog · MPC · JPL
(659568) 2019 OD_{31}	6 September 2008	Mount Lemmon Survey	Mount Lemmon	5.145	0.078	4.1	4.746	5.544	5.4 km	–	catalog · MPC · JPL
(659569) 2019 OY_{31}	30 July 2019	Pan-STARRS	Haleakala	5.195	0.051	5.5	4.929	5.461	6.2 km	–	catalog · MPC · JPL
(659571) 2019 PA_{5}	4 January 2012	Spacewatch	Kitt Peak	5.260	0.106	6.7	4.705	5.815	6.0 km	–	catalog · MPC · JPL
(659572) 2019 PQ_{8}	10 January 2013	Pan-STARRS	Haleakala	5.279	0.024	7.7	5.151	5.407	6.6 km	–	catalog · MPC · JPL
(659573) 2019 PS_{10}	24 September 2008	Spacewatch	Kitt Peak	5.316	0.071	3.1	4.938	5.693	6.7 km	–	catalog · MPC · JPL
(659579) 2019 PU_{41}	18 April 2015	CTIO-DECam	Cerro Tololo-DECam	5.122	0.093	6.9	4.646	5.597	5.3 km	–	catalog · MPC · JPL
(659581) 2019 PZ_{54}	5 August 2019	Pan-STARRS	Haleakala	5.259	0.086	6.1	4.805	5.713	6.3 km	–	catalog · MPC · JPL
(659582) 2019 PG_{59}	5 August 2019	Pan-STARRS	Haleakala	5.233	0.042	12.9	5.013	5.452	6.2 km	–	catalog · MPC · JPL
(659583) 2019 PW_{60}	18 April 2015	CTIO-DECam	Cerro Tololo-DECam	5.188	0.027	7.5	5.047	5.329	5.7 km	–	catalog · MPC · JPL
(659584) 2019 PX_{60}	8 August 2019	Pan-STARRS	Haleakala	5.202	0.098	15.8	4.694	5.710	5.8 km	–	catalog · MPC · JPL
(659586) 2019 PV_{67}	8 August 2019	Pan-STARRS	Haleakala	5.246	0.099	3.8	4.726	5.767	5.9 km	–	catalog · MPC · JPL
(659587) 2019 PE_{68}	1 October 2008	Mount Lemmon Survey	Mount Lemmon	5.338	0.029	10.4	5.181	5.494	6.3 km	–	catalog · MPC · JPL
(659593) 2019 QM_{36}	27 February 2014	Pan-STARRS	Haleakala	5.181	0.078	9.9	4.776	5.585	5.9 km	–	catalog · MPC · JPL
(659594) 2019 QB_{44}	18 May 2015	Pan-STARRS	Haleakala	5.235	0.028	7.7	5.086	5.384	6.4 km	–	catalog · MPC · JPL
(659595) 2019 QO_{53}	29 August 2019	Pan-STARRS	Haleakala	5.146	0.102	8.3	4.622	5.670	5.7 km	–	catalog · MPC · JPL
(659604) 2019 RA_{42}	9 October 2008	Mount Lemmon Survey	Mount Lemmon	5.170	0.057	2.2	4.876	5.465	6.4 km	–	catalog · MPC · JPL
(659631) 2019 SN_{136}	11 May 2015	Mount Lemmon Survey	Mount Lemmon	5.272	0.038	5.1	5.072	5.472	6.7 km	–	catalog · MPC · JPL
(659776) 2020 OP_{48}	17 July 2020	Pan-STARRS	Haleakala	5.230	0.046	16.9	4.990	5.469	6.8 km	–	catalog · MPC · JPL
(659778) 2020 PO_{25}	13 August 2020	Pan-STARRS 2	Haleakala	5.284	0.052	13.1	5.008	5.561	7.8 km	–	catalog · MPC · JPL
(659779) 2020 PY_{25}	15 August 2020	Pan-STARRS	Haleakala	5.195	0.177	12.3	4.274	6.116	5.9 km	–	catalog · MPC · JPL
(659780) 2020 PP_{39}	19 April 2015	CTIO-DECam	Cerro Tololo-DECam	5.357	0.046	5.9	5.112	5.603	6.5 km	–	catalog · MPC · JPL
(659781) 2020 QH_{11}	8 January 2013	Mount Lemmon Survey	Mount Lemmon	5.258	0.115	10.3	4.654	5.861	7.9 km	–	catalog · MPC · JPL
(659782) 2020 QT_{18}	6 June 2016	Pan-STARRS	Haleakala	5.206	0.106	23.8	4.655	5.758	7.8 km	–	catalog · MPC · JPL
(659783) 2020 QM_{30}	18 August 2020	Mount Lemmon Survey	Mount Lemmon	5.258	0.120	17.9	4.629	5.886	6.1 km	–	catalog · MPC · JPL
(659784) 2020 QA_{31}	23 August 2020	Pan-STARRS	Haleakala	5.191	0.143	16.9	4.450	5.932	5.8 km	–	catalog · MPC · JPL
(659785) 2020 QD_{65}	19 April 2015	CTIO-DECam	Cerro Tololo-DECam	5.279	0.072	13.6	4.897	5.661	5.8 km	–	catalog · MPC · JPL
(659786) 2020 QE_{84}	18 April 2015	CTIO-DECam	Cerro Tololo-DECam	5.284	0.113	6.1	4.685	5.883	6.0 km	–	catalog · MPC · JPL
(659787) 2020 RF_{84}	3 September 2008	Spacewatch	Kitt Peak	5.272	0.108	7.1	4.704	5.839	6.0 km	–	catalog · MPC · JPL
(659788) 2020 RX_{86}	19 September 2008	Spacewatch	Kitt Peak	5.242	0.045	9.1	5.004	5.481	6.4 km	–	catalog · MPC · JPL
(659789) 2020 RU_{88}	7 September 2008	Mount Lemmon Survey	Mount Lemmon	5.171	0.126	11.0	4.521	5.820	6.2 km	–	catalog · MPC · JPL
(659790) 2020 RP_{117}	18 May 2015	Pan-STARRS	Haleakala	5.161	0.100	20.0	4.647	5.675	6.9 km	–	catalog · MPC · JPL
(659791) 2020 RT_{118}	9 September 2020	Pan-STARRS	Haleakala	5.176	0.143	12.0	4.436	5.916	5.7 km	–	catalog · MPC · JPL
(659793) 2020 SZ_{62}	26 February 2014	Pan-STARRS	Haleakala	5.305	0.041	6.6	5.088	5.521	6.7 km	–	catalog · MPC · JPL
(659794) 2020 SV_{70}	16 September 2020	Pan-STARRS	Haleakala	5.250	0.101	7.5	4.718	5.782	5.9 km	–	catalog · MPC · JPL
(659795) 2020 TF_{12}	24 September 2008	Spacewatch	Kitt Peak	5.245	0.090	7.1	4.772	5.717	6.6 km	–	catalog · MPC · JPL
(659930) 2021 PC_{4}	9 January 2013	CSS	Catalina	5.121	0.123	22.5	4.493	5.749	8.8 km	–	catalog · MPC · JPL
(659948) 2021 SO_{41}	16 February 2015	Pan-STARRS	Haleakala	5.266	0.036	7.7	5.078	5.454	6.3 km	–	catalog · MPC · JPL
(659949) 2021 TC_{53}	18 April 2015	CTIO-DECam	Cerro Tololo-DECam	5.272	0.081	9.9	4.844	5.700	5.7 km	–	catalog · MPC · JPL
(659950) 2021 TV_{60}	8 November 2010	Mount Lemmon Survey	Mount Lemmon	5.172	0.118	6.3	4.560	5.785	5.8 km	–	catalog · MPC · JPL
(659951) 2021 UK_{1}	18 September 2020	Pan-STARRS	Haleakala	5.181	0.109	23.2	4.616	5.747	7.4 km	–	catalog · MPC · JPL
(659953) 2021 UX_{87}	24 October 2009	Spacewatch	Kitt Peak	5.288	0.078	6.7	4.878	5.698	6.2 km	–	catalog · MPC · JPL
(659954) 2021 VD_{12}	24 October 2009	Spacewatch	Kitt Peak	5.224	0.061	18.4	4.905	5.542	6.5 km	–	catalog · MPC · JPL
(660533) 2002 CO_{231}	15 February 2002	A. C. Becker	Cerro Tololo	5.260	0.069	38.1	4.897	5.624	7.3 km	–	catalog · MPC · JPL
(660534) 2002 CP_{231}	15 February 2002	A. C. Becker	Cerro Tololo	5.262	0.076	9.9	4.860	5.664	7.3 km	–	catalog · MPC · JPL
(663528) 2007 RD_{123}	12 September 2007	Mount Lemmon Survey	Mount Lemmon	5.198	0.068	4.4	4.844	5.553	5.2 km	–	catalog · MPC · JPL
(663583) 2007 RS_{352}	9 September 2008	Spacewatch	Kitt Peak	5.168	0.064	12.5	4.839	5.497	6.0 km	–	catalog · MPC · JPL
(664487) 2008 RG_{65}	4 September 2008	Spacewatch	Kitt Peak	5.293	0.045	8.1	5.056	5.530	7.5 km	–	catalog · MPC · JPL
(664524) 2008 RB_{167}	7 September 2008	Mount Lemmon Survey	Mount Lemmon	5.222	0.042	31.0	5.001	5.443	7.2 km	–	catalog · MPC · JPL
(664544) 2008 SR_{27}	19 September 2008	Spacewatch	Kitt Peak	5.291	0.062	28.6	4.961	5.621	9.5 km	–	catalog · MPC · JPL
(664643) 2008 SE_{275}	22 September 2008	Spacewatch	Kitt Peak	5.271	0.083	12.3	4.832	5.710	6.8 km	–	catalog · MPC · JPL
(664644) 2008 SV_{277}	25 September 2008	Mount Lemmon Survey	Mount Lemmon	5.283	0.109	20.5	4.707	5.860	8.5 km	–	catalog · MPC · JPL
(664675) 2008 SG_{334}	29 September 2008	Mount Lemmon Survey	Mount Lemmon	5.290	0.065	39.9	4.948	5.632	8.4 km	–	catalog · MPC · JPL
(664783) 2008 TN_{222}	9 October 2008	Mount Lemmon Survey	Mount Lemmon	5.250	0.036	13.2	5.059	5.440	5.1 km	–	catalog · MPC · JPL
(665537) 2009 RD_{17}	12 September 2009	Spacewatch	Kitt Peak	5.186	0.019	21.8	5.089	5.283	7.3 km	–	catalog · MPC · JPL
(665554) 2009 RA_{43}	15 September 2009	Spacewatch	Kitt Peak	5.191	0.088	7.3	4.736	5.646	7.0 km	–	catalog · MPC · JPL
(665562) 2009 RA_{57}	15 September 2009	Spacewatch	Kitt Peak	5.228	0.132	8.5	4.536	5.919	7.3 km	–	catalog · MPC · JPL
(665568) 2009 RZ_{68}	15 September 2009	Spacewatch	Kitt Peak	5.237	0.175	13.3	4.319	6.156	7.1 km	–	catalog · MPC · JPL
(665573) 2009 RX_{79}	12 November 2010	Mount Lemmon Survey	Mount Lemmon	5.148	0.191	6.2	4.165	6.131	7.0 km	–	catalog · MPC · JPL
(665576) 2009 RZ_{81}	14 September 2009	Spacewatch	Kitt Peak	5.213	0.083	32.1	4.781	5.644	6.6 km	–	catalog · MPC · JPL
(665577) 2009 RO_{82}	12 September 2009	Spacewatch	Kitt Peak	5.158	0.158	6.9	4.344	5.972	5.7 km	–	catalog · MPC · JPL
(665603) 2009 SP_{46}	16 September 2009	Spacewatch	Kitt Peak	5.177	0.141	8.8	4.447	5.908	6.6 km	–	catalog · MPC · JPL
(665604) 2009 SD_{47}	16 September 2009	Spacewatch	Kitt Peak	5.217	0.118	19.8	4.602	5.831	7.8 km	–	catalog · MPC · JPL
(665612) 2009 SP_{69}	17 September 2009	Spacewatch	Kitt Peak	5.233	0.158	5.6	4.408	6.059	5.8 km	–	catalog · MPC · JPL
(665639) 2009 SQ_{137}	18 September 2009	Spacewatch	Kitt Peak	5.144	0.111	6.5	4.572	5.716	5.3 km	–	catalog · MPC · JPL
(665642) 2009 SC_{142}	15 September 2009	Spacewatch	Kitt Peak	5.236	0.157	14.4	4.416	6.056	6.4 km	–	catalog · MPC · JPL
(665643) 2009 SF_{148}	19 September 2009	Mount Lemmon Survey	Mount Lemmon	5.132	0.084	6.3	4.700	5.564	6.7 km	–	catalog · MPC · JPL
(665651) 2009 SE_{159}	20 September 2009	Spacewatch	Kitt Peak	5.161	0.105	20.3	4.619	5.702	6.7 km	–	catalog · MPC · JPL
(665700) 2009 SH_{249}	18 September 2009	Spacewatch	Kitt Peak	5.263	0.027	4.9	5.120	5.407	7.7 km	–	catalog · MPC · JPL
(665702) 2009 SA_{251}	20 September 2009	Spacewatch	Kitt Peak	5.158	0.064	2.0	4.826	5.490	5.6 km	–	catalog · MPC · JPL
(665724) 2009 ST_{289}	25 September 2009	Spacewatch	Kitt Peak	5.176	0.134	7.7	4.482	5.871	7.5 km	–	catalog · MPC · JPL
(665731) 2009 ST_{306}	17 September 2009	Spacewatch	Kitt Peak	5.222	0.056	19.8	4.928	5.517	6.6 km	–	catalog · MPC · JPL
(665733) 2009 SE_{313}	18 September 2009	Spacewatch	Kitt Peak	5.224	0.089	25.0	4.762	5.686	7.5 km	–	catalog · MPC · JPL
(665748) 2009 SC_{370}	22 September 2009	Mount Lemmon Survey	Mount Lemmon	5.267	0.042	23.9	5.043	5.491	7.8 km	–	catalog · MPC · JPL
(665774) 2009 SV_{393}	28 September 2009	Mount Lemmon Survey	Mount Lemmon	5.142	0.117	21.1	4.540	5.743	6.7 km	–	catalog · MPC · JPL
(665776) 2009 SO_{396}	29 September 2009	Mount Lemmon Survey	Mount Lemmon	5.247	0.098	15.4	4.734	5.761	7.0 km	–	catalog · MPC · JPL
(665778) 2009 SU_{396}	28 September 2009	Mount Lemmon Survey	Mount Lemmon	5.118	0.103	8.7	4.589	5.647	6.4 km	–	catalog · MPC · JPL
(665780) 2009 SP_{401}	19 September 2009	Mount Lemmon Survey	Mount Lemmon	5.168	0.082	20.2	4.745	5.591	6.7 km	–	catalog · MPC · JPL
(665782) 2009 SA_{404}	22 September 2009	Mount Lemmon Survey	Mount Lemmon	5.248	0.122	10.5	4.608	5.889	5.9 km	–	catalog · MPC · JPL
(665783) 2009 SN_{404}	21 September 2009	Spacewatch	Kitt Peak	5.218	0.098	25.3	4.707	5.729	6.0 km	–	catalog · MPC · JPL
(665784) 2009 SU_{404}	29 September 2009	Mount Lemmon Survey	Mount Lemmon	5.210	0.240	8.4	3.961	6.459	6.1 km	–	catalog · MPC · JPL
(665786) 2009 SL_{412}	18 September 2009	Spacewatch	Kitt Peak	5.177	0.111	27.2	4.604	5.750	7.3 km	–	catalog · MPC · JPL
(665787) 2009 SW_{412}	20 September 2009	Mount Lemmon Survey	Mount Lemmon	5.149	0.025	19.4	5.018	5.280	8.0 km	–	catalog · MPC · JPL
(665788) 2009 SH_{413}	22 September 2009	Spacewatch	Kitt Peak	5.114	0.076	22.2	4.724	5.504	6.5 km	–	catalog · MPC · JPL
(665790) 2009 SU_{414}	18 September 2009	Spacewatch	Kitt Peak	5.256	0.130	7.6	4.572	5.940	6.1 km	–	catalog · MPC · JPL
(665792) 2009 SN_{420}	29 September 2009	Mount Lemmon Survey	Mount Lemmon	5.230	0.113	11.5	4.641	5.819	6.2 km	–	catalog · MPC · JPL
(665794) 2009 SR_{421}	17 September 2009	Spacewatch	Kitt Peak	5.161	0.071	9.2	4.796	5.527	6.0 km	–	catalog · MPC · JPL
(665848) 2009 UQ_{45}	18 October 2009	Mount Lemmon Survey	Mount Lemmon	5.139	0.047	14.2	4.899	5.379	7.1 km	–	catalog · MPC · JPL
(665857) 2009 UC_{62}	17 October 2009	Mount Lemmon Survey	Mount Lemmon	5.129	0.077	8.1	4.735	5.523	6.3 km	–	catalog · MPC · JPL
(665891) 2009 UX_{143}	22 October 2009	Mount Lemmon Survey	Mount Lemmon	5.166	0.086	20.3	4.722	5.610	7.5 km	–	catalog · MPC · JPL
(665892) 2009 UZ_{148}	29 September 2009	Spacewatch	Kitt Peak	5.248	0.116	30.4	4.637	5.858	7.1 km	–	catalog · MPC · JPL
(665893) 2009 UB_{151}	24 October 2009	Spacewatch	Kitt Peak	5.300	0.121	17.2	4.657	5.942	6.8 km	–	catalog · MPC · JPL
(665894) 2009 UA_{155}	23 October 2009	Mount Lemmon Survey	Mount Lemmon	5.274	0.183	11.2	4.307	6.241	6.2 km	–	catalog · MPC · JPL
(665919) 2009 UK_{179}	23 October 2009	Mount Lemmon Survey	Mount Lemmon	5.275	0.025	13.4	5.144	5.407	7.4 km	–	catalog · MPC · JPL
(665920) 2009 UO_{179}	18 October 2009	Mount Lemmon Survey	Mount Lemmon	5.160	0.091	29.5	4.691	5.630	7.2 km	–	catalog · MPC · JPL
(665921) 2009 UZ_{183}	23 October 2009	Mount Lemmon Survey	Mount Lemmon	5.247	0.095	7.9	4.748	5.746	6.8 km	–	catalog · MPC · JPL
(665927) 2009 VR_{11}	8 November 2009	Mount Lemmon Survey	Mount Lemmon	5.204	0.103	3.8	4.665	5.742	5.7 km	–	catalog · MPC · JPL
(665945) 2009 VV_{29}	9 November 2009	CSS	Catalina	5.242	0.105	9.4	4.690	5.794	6.3 km	–	catalog · MPC · JPL
(665957) 2009 VG_{52}	24 October 2009	Spacewatch	Kitt Peak	5.269	0.067	5.6	4.919	5.620	6.6 km	–	catalog · MPC · JPL
(666014) 2009 WW_{58}	16 November 2009	Mount Lemmon Survey	Mount Lemmon	5.289	0.067	2.5	4.933	5.645	7.1 km	–	catalog · MPC · JPL
(666108) 2009 WP_{228}	17 November 2009	Mount Lemmon Survey	Mount Lemmon	5.207	0.068	13.0	4.855	5.559	7.8 km	–	catalog · MPC · JPL
(666114) 2009 WV_{231}	17 November 2009	Mount Lemmon Survey	Mount Lemmon	5.245	0.089	13.5	4.776	5.715	7.3 km	–	catalog · MPC · JPL
(666158) 2009 WX_{286}	6 November 2010	Spacewatch	Kitt Peak	5.190	0.095	3.2	4.696	5.685	6.1 km	–	catalog · MPC · JPL
(666163) 2009 WM_{291}	23 November 2009	Mount Lemmon Survey	Mount Lemmon	5.299	0.037	6.4	5.105	5.493	6.6 km	–	catalog · MPC · JPL
(666300) 2010 CO_{255}	26 January 2012	Pan-STARRS	Haleakala	5.260	0.103	16.3	4.720	5.801	7.6 km	–	catalog · MPC · JPL
(666631) 2010 RB_{220}	5 September 2010	Mount Lemmon Survey	Mount Lemmon	5.166	0.106	24.6	4.617	5.716	7.1 km	–	catalog · MPC · JPL
(666760) 2010 TF_{215}	13 October 2010	Mount Lemmon Survey	Mount Lemmon	5.202	0.079	6.1	4.793	5.612	7.8 km	–	catalog · MPC · JPL
(666768) 2010 TA_{241}	13 October 2010	Mount Lemmon Survey	Mount Lemmon	5.139	0.090	7.4	4.674	5.604	4.9 km	–	catalog · MPC · JPL
(666799) 2010 UK_{97}	28 October 2010	Mount Lemmon Survey	Mount Lemmon	5.172	0.140	13.9	4.446	5.898	6.8 km	–	catalog · MPC · JPL
(666818) 2010 UR_{130}	29 October 2010	Mount Lemmon Survey	Mount Lemmon	5.198	0.150	21.8	4.419	5.976	6.7 km	–	catalog · MPC · JPL
(666844) 2010 VC_{52}	3 November 2010	Mount Lemmon Survey	Mount Lemmon	5.146	0.096	23.9	4.652	5.640	7.2 km	–	catalog · MPC · JPL
(666866) 2010 VN_{122}	8 November 2010	Mount Lemmon Survey	Mount Lemmon	5.155	0.147	25.7	4.397	5.914	9.2 km	–	catalog · MPC · JPL
(666874) 2010 VV_{148}	6 November 2010	Mount Lemmon Survey	Mount Lemmon	5.123	0.065	8.6	4.789	5.456	6.5 km	–	catalog · MPC · JPL
(666876) 2010 VS_{157}	29 October 2010	Mount Lemmon Survey	Mount Lemmon	5.116	0.049	5.0	4.863	5.369	6.2 km	–	catalog · MPC · JPL
(666879) 2010 VZ_{168}	10 November 2010	Mount Lemmon Survey	Mount Lemmon	5.240	0.051	10.3	4.973	5.507	6.4 km	–	catalog · MPC · JPL
(666881) 2010 VT_{170}	10 November 2010	Mount Lemmon Survey	Mount Lemmon	5.205	0.121	3.0	4.576	5.835	6.6 km	–	catalog · MPC · JPL
(666913) 2010 VU_{237}	11 November 2010	Mount Lemmon Survey	Mount Lemmon	5.157	0.189	1.7	4.181	6.133	4.9 km	–	catalog · MPC · JPL
(666916) 2010 VX_{245}	13 November 2010	Mount Lemmon Survey	Mount Lemmon	5.190	0.133	7.1	4.498	5.881	6.5 km	–	catalog · MPC · JPL
(666917) 2010 VA_{246}	5 November 2010	Spacewatch	Kitt Peak	5.186	0.057	16.3	4.890	5.482	7.2 km	–	catalog · MPC · JPL
(666926) 2010 VD_{257}	12 November 2010	Mount Lemmon Survey	Mount Lemmon	5.120	0.009	8.7	5.073	5.168	6.7 km	–	catalog · MPC · JPL
(666927) 2010 VD_{263}	6 November 2010	Mount Lemmon Survey	Mount Lemmon	5.161	0.130	10.0	4.492	5.829	5.7 km	–	catalog · MPC · JPL
(666938) 2010 WA_{6}	27 November 2010	Mount Lemmon Survey	Mount Lemmon	5.189	0.102	7.6	4.660	5.718	6.3 km	–	catalog · MPC · JPL
(666973) 2010 XX_{26}	27 September 2009	Spacewatch	Kitt Peak	5.181	0.035	9.9	4.998	5.365	6.9 km	–	catalog · MPC · JPL
(667017) 2010 XW_{114}	13 December 2010	Mount Lemmon Survey	Mount Lemmon	5.220	0.161	16.8	4.380	6.060	6.3 km	–	catalog · MPC · JPL
(667019) 2010 XN_{118}	14 December 2010	Mount Lemmon Survey	Mount Lemmon	5.284	0.177	11.5	4.350	6.219	5.7 km	–	catalog · MPC · JPL
(667020) 2010 XQ_{119}	3 December 2010	Mount Lemmon Survey	Mount Lemmon	5.177	0.147	2.9	4.416	5.939	5.1 km	–	catalog · MPC · JPL
(667022) 2010 XU_{121}	2 December 2010	Spacewatch	Kitt Peak	5.161	0.198	15.5	4.141	6.182	6.8 km	–	catalog · MPC · JPL
(667085) 2011 BT_{24}	12 November 2010	Mount Lemmon Survey	Mount Lemmon	5.192	0.228	27.2	4.008	6.375	7.8 km	–	catalog · MPC · JPL
(668444) 2011 YJ_{50}	26 December 2011	Mount Lemmon Survey	Mount Lemmon	5.198	0.123	12.7	4.557	5.839	6.4 km	–	catalog · MPC · JPL
(668486) 2011 YY_{90}	29 December 2011	Mount Lemmon Survey	Mount Lemmon	5.282	0.021	31.8	5.172	5.391	8.5 km	–	catalog · MPC · JPL
(668487) 2011 YB_{91}	26 December 2011	Spacewatch	Kitt Peak	5.234	0.066	9.6	4.889	5.578	7.3 km	–	catalog · MPC · JPL
(668523) 2012 AR_{33}	2 January 2012	Mount Lemmon Survey	Mount Lemmon	5.242	0.159	14.1	4.409	6.075	6.7 km	–	catalog · MPC · JPL
(668526) 2012 AS_{36}	2 January 2012	Mount Lemmon Survey	Mount Lemmon	5.093	0.060	8.3	4.789	5.396	6.2 km	–	catalog · MPC · JPL
(668540) 2012 BT_{38}	14 December 2010	Mount Lemmon Survey	Mount Lemmon	5.171	0.123	8.6	4.536	5.805	6.1 km	–	catalog · MPC · JPL
(668550) 2012 BR_{76}	23 September 2008	Mount Lemmon Survey	Mount Lemmon	5.248	0.061	4.3	4.929	5.567	6.7 km	–	catalog · MPC · JPL
(668551) 2012 BS_{76}	26 January 2012	Pan-STARRS	Haleakala	5.264	0.038	5.3	5.066	5.462	6.1 km	–	catalog · MPC · JPL
(668560) 2012 BQ_{92}	26 January 2012	Pan-STARRS	Haleakala	5.265	0.060	19.2	4.949	5.581	7.5 km	–	catalog · MPC · JPL
(668561) 2012 BP_{96}	29 December 2011	Mount Lemmon Survey	Mount Lemmon	5.280	0.136	10.2	4.560	6.000	6.0 km	–	catalog · MPC · JPL
(668574) 2012 BD_{141}	16 November 2009	Mount Lemmon Survey	Mount Lemmon	5.250	0.106	11.3	4.691	5.808	6.3 km	–	catalog · MPC · JPL
(668577) 2012 BF_{151}	26 January 2012	Pan-STARRS	Haleakala	5.185	0.122	11.0	4.551	5.819	6.5 km	–	catalog · MPC · JPL
(668594) 2012 BU_{172}	26 January 2012	Mount Lemmon Survey	Mount Lemmon	5.202	0.079	8.7	4.790	5.615	6.4 km	–	catalog · MPC · JPL
(668595) 2012 BZ_{172}	19 January 2012	Spacewatch	Kitt Peak	5.285	0.073	14.9	4.898	5.671	7.2 km	–	catalog · MPC · JPL
(668600) 2012 BM_{178}	26 January 2012	Pan-STARRS	Haleakala	5.217	0.099	11.7	4.702	5.732	6.4 km	–	catalog · MPC · JPL
(668601) 2012 BJ_{179}	20 January 2012	Mount Lemmon Survey	Mount Lemmon	5.267	0.066	12.3	4.917	5.616	6.7 km	–	catalog · MPC · JPL
(668602) 2012 BA_{184}	26 January 2012	Mount Lemmon Survey	Mount Lemmon	5.335	0.064	0.9	4.993	5.677	5.3 km	–	catalog · MPC · JPL
(669570) 2012 YS_{23}	23 December 2012	Pan-STARRS	Haleakala	5.254	0.032	20.0	5.085	5.423	7.9 km	–	catalog · MPC · JPL
(669596) 2013 AV_{36}	20 October 2012	Mount Lemmon Survey	Mount Lemmon	5.165	0.066	20.2	4.825	5.505	9.4 km	–	catalog · MPC · JPL
(669647) 2013 AJ_{133}	7 January 2013	Spacewatch	Kitt Peak	5.110	0.057	6.6	4.820	5.399	6.7 km	–	catalog · MPC · JPL
(669686) 2013 AQ_{194}	10 January 2013	Spacewatch	Kitt Peak	5.232	0.083	30.5	4.798	5.666	7.6 km	–	catalog · MPC · JPL
(669697) 2013 AG_{205}	6 January 2013	Spacewatch	Kitt Peak	5.109	0.067	31.3	4.765	5.454	7.7 km	–	catalog · MPC · JPL
(669699) 2013 BX	6 January 2013	Spacewatch	Kitt Peak	5.207	0.033	16.0	5.035	5.378	9.6 km	–	catalog · MPC · JPL
(669705) 2013 BD_{16}	4 November 2010	Mount Lemmon Survey	Mount Lemmon	5.109	0.062	22.2	4.793	5.425	6.8 km	–	catalog · MPC · JPL
(669707) 2013 BS_{17}	12 December 2012	Mount Lemmon Survey	Mount Lemmon	5.124	0.090	7.8	4.664	5.584	6.3 km	–	catalog · MPC · JPL
(669712) 2013 BD_{28}	3 January 2013	Pan-STARRS	Haleakala	5.237	0.121	34.4	4.604	5.871	10 km	–	catalog · MPC · JPL
(669718) 2013 BZ_{44}	18 January 2013	Pan-STARRS	Haleakala	5.248	0.098	15.3	4.732	5.765	7.8 km	–	catalog · MPC · JPL
(669755) 2013 BS_{98}	18 January 2013	Mount Lemmon Survey	Mount Lemmon	5.167	0.082	6.7	4.743	5.591	6.1 km	–	catalog · MPC · JPL
(669759) 2013 BT_{101}	18 January 2013	Mount Lemmon Survey	Mount Lemmon	5.160	0.137	14.7	4.453	5.867	6.4 km	–	catalog · MPC · JPL
(669773) 2013 CM_{11}	1 January 2012	Mount Lemmon Survey	Mount Lemmon	5.147	0.044	8.9	4.920	5.374	7.0 km	–	catalog · MPC · JPL
(669796) 2013 CA_{56}	8 February 2013	Pan-STARRS	Haleakala	5.264	0.051	19.1	4.997	5.530	6.7 km	–	catalog · MPC · JPL
(669811) 2013 CQ_{74}	7 January 2013	Spacewatch	Kitt Peak	5.271	0.060	26.6	4.952	5.590	11 km	–	catalog · MPC · JPL
(669826) 2013 CK_{100}	29 December 2011	Mount Lemmon Survey	Mount Lemmon	5.146	0.094	18.0	4.661	5.631	7.8 km	–	catalog · MPC · JPL
(669857) 2013 CX_{152}	3 January 2012	Mount Lemmon Survey	Mount Lemmon	5.274	0.106	27.7	4.713	5.835	7.4 km	–	catalog · MPC · JPL
(669862) 2013 CW_{155}	4 September 2008	Spacewatch	Kitt Peak	5.231	0.082	8.1	4.804	5.658	6.9 km	–	catalog · MPC · JPL
(669864) 2013 CC_{160}	14 February 2013	Pan-STARRS	Haleakala	5.184	0.066	7.0	4.839	5.528	6.5 km	–	catalog · MPC · JPL
(669888) 2013 CF_{185}	8 February 2013	Mount Lemmon Survey	Mount Lemmon	5.121	0.140	22.3	4.405	5.838	7.3 km	–	catalog · MPC · JPL
(669903) 2013 CR_{205}	10 January 2013	Pan-STARRS	Haleakala	5.174	0.017	20.1	5.084	5.264	7.9 km	–	catalog · MPC · JPL
(669915) 2013 CW_{220}	9 February 2013	Pan-STARRS	Haleakala	5.249	0.039	11.2	5.042	5.455	6.5 km	–	catalog · MPC · JPL
(669933) 2013 CT_{240}	8 February 2013	Pan-STARRS	Haleakala	5.211	0.120	6.6	4.587	5.835	5.7 km	–	catalog · MPC · JPL
(669937) 2013 CN_{246}	8 February 2013	Pan-STARRS	Haleakala	5.135	0.093	8.2	4.655	5.614	5.5 km	–	catalog · MPC · JPL
(669938) 2013 CQ_{249}	8 February 2013	Spacewatch	Kitt Peak	5.241	0.036	11.4	5.052	5.429	7.4 km	–	catalog · MPC · JPL
(669944) 2013 CG_{254}	8 February 2013	Pan-STARRS	Haleakala	5.247	0.137	12.5	4.531	5.964	5.9 km	–	catalog · MPC · JPL
(670961) 2014 DB_{169}	26 February 2014	Mount Lemmon Survey	Mount Lemmon	5.138	0.033	8.7	4.970	5.307	6.2 km	–	catalog · MPC · JPL
(670965) 2014 DJ_{177}	25 February 2014	Spacewatch	Kitt Peak	5.204	0.073	31.3	4.825	5.583	8.2 km	–	catalog · MPC · JPL
(670966) 2014 DQ_{177}	26 February 2014	Pan-STARRS	Haleakala	5.202	0.087	27.6	4.749	5.655	8.1 km	–	catalog · MPC · JPL
(670976) 2014 DB_{194}	8 December 2012	Mount Lemmon Survey	Mount Lemmon	5.101	0.102	1.5	4.579	5.623	5.5 km	–	catalog · MPC · JPL
(670979) 2014 ET_{3}	22 February 2014	Spacewatch	Kitt Peak	5.135	0.016	26.1	5.053	5.217	7.9 km	–	catalog · MPC · JPL
(670984) 2014 EH_{12}	27 November 2011	L. Bernasconi	Les Engarouines	5.275	0.057	18.7	4.976	5.575	9.6 km	–	catalog · MPC · JPL
(670992) 2014 EP_{34}	19 September 2009	CSS	Catalina	5.154	0.195	21.6	4.148	6.159	9.6 km	–	catalog · MPC · JPL
(671008) 2014 EG_{68}	8 November 2009	Spacewatch	Kitt Peak	5.282	0.022	7.3	5.168	5.397	7.8 km	–	catalog · MPC · JPL
(671017) 2014 ED_{101}	22 September 2009	Mount Lemmon Survey	Mount Lemmon	5.179	0.082	11.8	4.754	5.604	7.8 km	–	catalog · MPC · JPL
(671019) 2014 EQ_{108}	20 September 2009	Spacewatch	Kitt Peak	5.143	0.070	9.4	4.783	5.503	6.1 km	–	catalog · MPC · JPL
(671023) 2014 EC_{116}	3 March 2014	CTIO-DECam	Cerro Tololo-DECam	5.204	0.026	24.0	5.068	5.341	6.5 km	–	catalog · MPC · JPL
(671024) 2014 EK_{118}	13 April 2015	Pan-STARRS	Haleakala	5.238	0.075	8.6	4.845	5.632	6.3 km	–	catalog · MPC · JPL
(671025) 2014 ET_{118}	10 November 2010	Mount Lemmon Survey	Mount Lemmon	5.130	0.090	6.6	4.666	5.594	5.6 km	–	catalog · MPC · JPL
(671036) 2014 EB_{188}	2 March 2014	CTIO-DECam	Cerro Tololo-DECam	5.192	0.073	14.4	4.813	5.571	5.7 km	–	catalog · MPC · JPL
(671039) 2014 EM_{219}	29 July 2008	Mount Lemmon Survey	Mount Lemmon	5.183	0.063	16.0	4.856	5.509	8.7 km	–	catalog · MPC · JPL
(671055) 2014 FT_{4}	22 January 2013	Mount Lemmon Survey	Mount Lemmon	5.129	0.068	8.6	4.779	5.478	7.1 km	–	catalog · MPC · JPL
(671056) 2014 FU_{4}	27 September 2009	Mount Lemmon Survey	Mount Lemmon	5.187	0.022	8.4	5.072	5.302	6.0 km	–	catalog · MPC · JPL
(671073) 2014 FT_{43}	27 November 2010	Mount Lemmon Survey	Mount Lemmon	5.132	0.081	8.0	4.716	5.548	6.2 km	–	catalog · MPC · JPL
(671146) 2014 GA_{72}	5 April 2014	Pan-STARRS	Haleakala	5.209	0.148	10.1	4.436	5.982	6.8 km	–	catalog · MPC · JPL
(673520) 2015 DO_{133}	27 September 2012	Pan-STARRS	Haleakala	5.175	0.090	19.6	4.707	5.643	8.2 km	–	catalog · MPC · JPL
(673607) 2015 DQ_{280}	27 February 2015	Pan-STARRS	Haleakala	5.165	0.041	10.4	4.952	5.378	6.7 km	–	catalog · MPC · JPL
(673681) 2015 FE_{45}	28 September 2009	Mount Lemmon Survey	Mount Lemmon	5.221	0.119	24.9	4.600	5.841	7.2 km	–	catalog · MPC · JPL
(673726) 2015 FW_{154}	21 March 2015	Pan-STARRS	Haleakala	5.256	0.012	28.3	5.191	5.321	7.1 km	–	catalog · MPC · JPL
(673732) 2015 FJ_{166}	15 September 2009	Spacewatch	Kitt Peak	5.152	0.034	27.0	4.978	5.327	8.4 km	–	catalog · MPC · JPL
(673751) 2015 FQ_{211}	28 September 2009	Mount Lemmon Survey	Mount Lemmon	5.139	0.042	8.6	4.924	5.354	6.9 km	–	catalog · MPC · JPL
(673769) 2015 FU_{234}	25 September 2009	Spacewatch	Kitt Peak	5.223	0.014	9.4	5.148	5.297	7.1 km	–	catalog · MPC · JPL
(673845) 2015 FC_{358}	8 February 2013	Pan-STARRS	Haleakala	5.180	0.052	9.2	4.913	5.448	6.8 km	–	catalog · MPC · JPL
(673848) 2015 FR_{360}	17 March 2015	Pan-STARRS	Haleakala	5.203	0.046	12.1	4.965	5.441	7.2 km	–	catalog · MPC · JPL
(673853) 2015 FN_{373}	18 March 2015	Pan-STARRS	Haleakala	5.173	0.015	27.9	5.093	5.253	7.9 km	–	catalog · MPC · JPL
(673896) 2015 GQ_{19}	11 April 2015	Mount Lemmon Survey	Mount Lemmon	5.089	0.041	9.1	4.880	5.298	6.1 km	–	catalog · MPC · JPL
(673981) 2015 HH_{125}	25 October 2009	Spacewatch	Kitt Peak	5.294	0.093	19.3	4.802	5.785	7.4 km	–	catalog · MPC · JPL
(674014) 2015 HY_{216}	24 April 2015	Pan-STARRS	Haleakala	5.222	0.021	21.2	5.111	5.334	7.9 km	–	catalog · MPC · JPL
(674017) 2015 HL_{241}	30 April 2016	Pan-STARRS	Haleakala	5.219	0.088	7.1	4.757	5.681	6.0 km	–	catalog · MPC · JPL
(674024) 2015 JP_{7}	15 May 2015	Pan-STARRS	Haleakala	5.142	0.095	19.6	4.654	5.629	6.7 km	–	catalog · MPC · JPL
(674028) 2015 JT_{19}	13 May 2015	Mount Lemmon Survey	Mount Lemmon	5.213	0.094	8.4	4.721	5.705	7.2 km	–	catalog · MPC · JPL
(674068) 2015 KW_{64}	2 January 2012	Spacewatch	Kitt Peak	5.251	0.065	8.5	4.909	5.593	6.5 km	–	catalog · MPC · JPL
(676348) 2016 EN_{299}	15 March 2016	Pan-STARRS	Haleakala	5.221	0.046	31.1	4.981	5.462	8.0 km	–	catalog · MPC · JPL
(676457) 2016 GN_{164}	13 November 2010	Mount Lemmon Survey	Mount Lemmon	5.140	0.065	9.2	4.808	5.473	6.2 km	–	catalog · MPC · JPL
(676539) 2016 GQ_{277}	10 April 2016	Pan-STARRS	Haleakala	5.291	0.010	22.5	5.237	5.345	7.9 km	–	catalog · MPC · JPL
(676550) 2016 GE_{304}	8 February 2013	Pan-STARRS	Haleakala	5.139	0.057	12.8	4.846	5.433	6.4 km	–	catalog · MPC · JPL
(676553) 2016 GT_{311}	10 April 2016	Pan-STARRS	Haleakala	5.108	0.031	31.2	4.949	5.266	7.3 km	–	catalog · MPC · JPL
(676560) 2016 HQ_{11}	17 October 2010	Mount Lemmon Survey	Mount Lemmon	5.144	0.098	7.5	4.642	5.647	8.4 km	–	catalog · MPC · JPL
(676576) 2016 HC_{31}	30 April 2016	Pan-STARRS	Haleakala	5.182	0.045	33.5	4.950	5.413	7.4 km	–	catalog · MPC · JPL
(676616) 2016 KQ_{7}	14 November 2010	Mount Lemmon Survey	Mount Lemmon	5.152	0.028	8.0	5.009	5.295	6.8 km	–	catalog · MPC · JPL
(676667) 2016 LK_{81}	3 June 2016	Pan-STARRS	Haleakala	5.219	0.078	30.0	4.809	5.629	7.9 km	–	catalog · MPC · JPL
(679016) 2018 LQ_{24}	12 June 2018	Pan-STARRS	Haleakala	5.243	0.147	17.7	4.472	6.014	7.6 km	–	catalog · MPC · JPL
(679024) 2018 MT_{20}	18 June 2018	Pan-STARRS	Haleakala	5.201	0.028	14.3	5.054	5.348	6.5 km	–	catalog · MPC · JPL
(679026) 2018 MT_{23}	18 June 2018	Pan-STARRS	Haleakala	5.273	0.079	29.5	4.859	5.687	7.4 km	–	catalog · MPC · JPL
(679030) 2018 NU_{15}	10 July 2018	Pan-STARRS	Haleakala	5.184	0.124	18.7	4.540	5.827	7.0 km	–	catalog · MPC · JPL
(679050) 2018 PM_{75}	5 August 2018	Pan-STARRS	Haleakala	5.245	0.072	3.9	4.869	5.621	4.4 km	–	catalog · MPC · JPL
(679525) 2019 KO_{4}	29 May 2019	Pan-STARRS	Haleakala	5.225	0.085	30.6	4.779	5.670	11 km	–	catalog · MPC · JPL
(679532) 2019 LC_{2}	4 June 2005	Spacewatch	Kitt Peak	5.225	0.072	20.2	4.851	5.600	9.3 km	–	catalog · MPC · JPL
(679541) 2019 MQ_{15}	18 April 2015	CTIO-DECam	Cerro Tololo-DECam	5.252	0.115	11.4	4.645	5.858	6.2 km	–	catalog · MPC · JPL
(679543) 2019 NM_{9}	1 July 2019	Pan-STARRS	Haleakala	5.252	0.092	18.4	4.770	5.734	5.6 km	–	catalog · MPC · JPL
(679546) 2019 NQ_{47}	1 July 2019	Pan-STARRS	Haleakala	5.273	0.202	12.9	4.209	6.336	5.7 km	–	catalog · MPC · JPL
(679547) 2019 NA_{48}	1 July 2019	Pan-STARRS	Haleakala	5.188	0.160	14.8	4.358	6.019	6.1 km	–	catalog · MPC · JPL
(679548) 2019 NK_{48}	1 July 2019	Pan-STARRS	Haleakala	5.225	0.088	22.5	4.763	5.687	7.4 km	–	catalog · MPC · JPL
(679549) 2019 NM_{58}	18 April 2015	CTIO-DECam	Cerro Tololo-DECam	5.100	0.030	14.3	4.945	5.255	7.2 km	–	catalog · MPC · JPL
(679550) 2019 NZ_{59}	6 July 2019	Pan-STARRS	Haleakala	5.179	0.137	16.2	4.471	5.887	7.3 km	–	catalog · MPC · JPL
(679557) 2019 OZ_{25}	21 September 2009	Mount Lemmon Survey	Mount Lemmon	5.122	0.058	9.9	4.823	5.421	6.3 km	–	catalog · MPC · JPL
(679558) 2019 OM_{26}	25 July 2019	Pan-STARRS	Haleakala	5.225	0.115	12.8	4.626	5.824	6.6 km	–	catalog · MPC · JPL
(679559) 2019 OP_{26}	17 April 2015	CTIO-DECam	Cerro Tololo-DECam	5.218	0.105	27.2	4.670	5.765	6.8 km	–	catalog · MPC · JPL
(679560) 2019 ON_{27}	28 July 2019	Pan-STARRS 2	Haleakala	5.178	0.094	8.5	4.691	5.664	6.4 km	–	catalog · MPC · JPL
(679561) 2019 OZ_{27}	18 April 2015	CTIO-DECam	Cerro Tololo-DECam	5.288	0.102	17.6	4.749	5.828	7.7 km	–	catalog · MPC · JPL
(679562) 2019 OC_{32}	26 July 2019	Pan-STARRS	Haleakala	5.183	0.138	15.7	4.470	5.896	5.5 km	–	catalog · MPC · JPL
(679568) 2019 PV_{44}	8 August 2019	Pan-STARRS 2	Haleakala	5.103	0.045	12.1	4.876	5.331	6.8 km	–	catalog · MPC · JPL
(679569) 2019 PK_{51}	8 August 2019	Pan-STARRS	Haleakala	5.205	0.139	14.8	4.482	5.928	6.5 km	–	catalog · MPC · JPL
(679570) 2019 PL_{51}	13 October 2010	Mount Lemmon Survey	Mount Lemmon	5.133	0.080	6.5	4.725	5.542	5.1 km	–	catalog · MPC · JPL
(679572) 2019 QM_{8}	31 March 2015	Pan-STARRS	Haleakala	5.260	0.021	27.2	5.151	5.369	8.6 km	–	catalog · MPC · JPL
(679579) 2019 QT_{40}	27 August 2019	Mount Lemmon Survey	Mount Lemmon	5.170	0.045	31.5	4.938	5.402	8.3 km	–	catalog · MPC · JPL
(679582) 2019 QP_{57}	28 August 2019	Pan-STARRS	Haleakala	5.229	0.099	4.0	4.712	5.745	5.0 km	–	catalog · MPC · JPL
(679583) 2019 QS_{74}	29 August 2019	Pan-STARRS	Haleakala	5.220	0.137	12.7	4.502	5.937	4.9 km	–	catalog · MPC · JPL
(679589) 2019 RT_{28}	20 May 2015	CTIO-DECam	Cerro Tololo-DECam	5.239	0.040	3.5	5.032	5.447	5.9 km	–	catalog · MPC · JPL
(679594) 2019 RR_{67}	6 September 2019	Pan-STARRS	Haleakala	5.204	0.075	6.7	4.813	5.594	4.8 km	–	catalog · MPC · JPL
(679782) 2020 OT_{81}	17 October 2010	Mount Lemmon Survey	Mount Lemmon	5.200	0.069	10.4	4.843	5.557	7.6 km	–	catalog · MPC · JPL
(679792) 2020 QH_{40}	8 November 2010	Spacewatch	Kitt Peak	5.203	0.132	18.6	4.518	5.888	6.8 km	–	catalog · MPC · JPL
(679793) 2020 QL_{42}	6 September 2008	Mount Lemmon Survey	Mount Lemmon	5.235	0.173	1.2	4.330	6.140	5.3 km	–	catalog · MPC · JPL
(679794) 2020 QE_{65}	28 September 2009	Mount Lemmon Survey	Mount Lemmon	5.152	0.086	8.6	4.710	5.593	6.6 km	–	catalog · MPC · JPL
(679796) 2020 QR_{71}	11 November 2010	Mount Lemmon Survey	Mount Lemmon	5.135	0.099	6.2	4.626	5.643	6.0 km	–	catalog · MPC · JPL
(679797) 2020 QA_{84}	9 October 2010	Mount Lemmon Survey	Mount Lemmon	5.195	0.208	3.7	4.117	6.274	5.3 km	–	catalog · MPC · JPL
(679799) 2020 RS_{28}	3 November 2010	Mount Lemmon Survey	Mount Lemmon	5.090	0.054	13.2	4.816	5.365	6.7 km	–	catalog · MPC · JPL
(679801) 2020 RS_{88}	15 September 2009	Spacewatch	Kitt Peak	5.165	0.085	9.1	4.726	5.605	5.6 km	–	catalog · MPC · JPL
(679802) 2020 RU_{99}	5 June 2016	Pan-STARRS	Haleakala	5.335	0.089	16.2	4.862	5.809	6.8 km	–	catalog · MPC · JPL
(679803) 2020 RW_{103}	15 September 2009	Spacewatch	Kitt Peak	5.186	0.123	1.6	4.547	5.826	5.0 km	–	catalog · MPC · JPL
(679804) 2020 RF_{117}	18 April 2015	CTIO-DECam	Cerro Tololo-DECam	5.147	0.122	11.2	4.520	5.775	5.1 km	–	catalog · MPC · JPL
(679805) 2020 RA_{130}	18 April 2015	CTIO-DECam	Cerro Tololo-DECam	5.159	0.049	8.4	4.908	5.409	5.4 km	–	catalog · MPC · JPL
(679806) 2020 SA_{28}	17 September 2019	Pan-STARRS	Haleakala	5.175	0.012	21.3	5.112	5.237	7.1 km	–	catalog · MPC · JPL
(679810) 2020 SS_{69}	23 March 2015	L. H. Wasserman; M. W. Buie	Kitt Peak	5.136	0.023	20.8	5.020	5.252	7.8 km	–	catalog · MPC · JPL
(679812) 2020 SE_{84}	19 April 2015	CTIO-DECam	Cerro Tololo-DECam	5.186	0.117	11.6	4.581	5.791	5.9 km	–	catalog · MPC · JPL
(679813) 2020 SK_{84}	26 February 2014	Pan-STARRS	Haleakala	5.221	0.079	18.5	4.811	5.632	6.1 km	–	catalog · MPC · JPL
(679817) 2020 TV_{69}	10 October 2020	Pan-STARRS	Haleakala	5.174	0.067	9.4	4.828	5.520	5.9 km	–	catalog · MPC · JPL
(679818) 2020 TT_{77}	29 April 2015	M. Altmann; T. Prusti	Cerro Paranal	5.251	0.126	13.5	4.589	5.914	6.2 km	–	catalog · MPC · JPL
(679935) 2021 RR_{46}	4 September 2021	Pan-STARRS	Haleakala	5.281	0.124	27.2	4.625	5.936	7.0 km	–	catalog · MPC · JPL
(679939) 2021 RK_{64}	30 October 2010	Spacewatch	Kitt Peak	5.182	0.082	32.8	4.757	5.606	6.4 km	–	catalog · MPC · JPL
(679957) 2021 TL_{36}	9 August 2019	Pan-STARRS	Haleakala	5.099	0.106	6.7	4.560	5.638	5.2 km	–	catalog · MPC · JPL
(679958) 2021 TT_{42}	6 November 2010	Mount Lemmon Survey	Mount Lemmon	5.191	0.151	6.7	4.407	5.976	6.0 km	–	catalog · MPC · JPL
(679959) 2021 TR_{45}	17 January 2013	Mount Lemmon Survey	Mount Lemmon	5.211	0.105	5.0	4.665	5.758	6.0 km	–	catalog · MPC · JPL
(679960) 2021 UL_{20}	28 August 2019	Pan-STARRS	Haleakala	5.272	0.051	11.7	5.004	5.539	5.3 km	–	catalog · MPC · JPL
(680153) 1999 YO_{30}	13 October 2010	Mount Lemmon Survey	Mount Lemmon	5.141	0.056	9.3	4.853	5.429	7.8 km	–	catalog · MPC · JPL
(680484) 2002 GE_{31}	7 April 2002	Cerro Tololo Obs.	Cerro Tololo	5.263	0.096	7.2	4.759	5.768	6.3 km	–	catalog · MPC · JPL
(683198) 2007 RE_{166}	10 September 2007	Spacewatch	Kitt Peak	5.281	0.064	7.9	4.944	5.618	6.3 km	–	catalog · MPC · JPL
(683217) 2007 RY_{196}	13 September 2007	Mount Lemmon Survey	Mount Lemmon	5.176	0.047	8.4	4.934	5.418	7.0 km	–	catalog · MPC · JPL
(683262) 2007 RK_{351}	19 January 2013	Spacewatch	Kitt Peak	5.294	0.040	5.3	5.080	5.508	7.4 km	–	catalog · MPC · JPL
(684304) 2008 RO_{186}	6 September 2008	Spacewatch	Kitt Peak	5.282	0.090	7.8	4.805	5.759	6.0 km	–	catalog · MPC · JPL
(684390) 2008 SZ_{338}	23 September 2008	Spacewatch	Kitt Peak	5.214	0.060	9.3	4.900	5.529	6.7 km	–	catalog · MPC · JPL
(684519) 2008 TY_{232}	9 October 2008	Mount Lemmon Survey	Mount Lemmon	5.266	0.048	9.8	5.011	5.522	6.9 km	–	catalog · MPC · JPL
(685432) 2009 SS_{301}	16 September 2009	Spacewatch	Kitt Peak	5.246	0.071	7.9	4.875	5.617	6.7 km	–	catalog · MPC · JPL
(685439) 2009 SU_{319}	20 September 2009	Spacewatch	Kitt Peak	5.200	0.070	7.8	4.835	5.565	6.4 km	–	catalog · MPC · JPL
(685492) 2009 SD_{411}	19 September 2009	Spacewatch	Kitt Peak	5.202	0.061	15.1	4.883	5.522	7.1 km	–	catalog · MPC · JPL
(685496) 2009 SN_{415}	28 September 2009	Spacewatch	Kitt Peak	5.168	0.099	2.2	4.658	5.678	6.0 km	–	catalog · MPC · JPL
(685498) 2009 SK_{419}	25 September 2009	Spacewatch	Kitt Peak	5.203	0.023	5.7	5.083	5.324	7.2 km	–	catalog · MPC · JPL
(685595) 2009 UG_{196}	20 April 2015	CTIO-DECam	Cerro Tololo-DECam	5.207	0.043	4.6	4.982	5.431	4.9 km	–	catalog · MPC · JPL
(685609) 2009 VF_{54}	24 October 2009	Spacewatch	Kitt Peak	5.178	0.098	7.6	4.672	5.684	5.6 km	–	catalog · MPC · JPL
(686318) 2010 TX_{221}	12 October 2010	Mount Lemmon Survey	Mount Lemmon	5.173	0.068	8.1	4.823	5.523	7.5 km	–	catalog · MPC · JPL
(686489) 2010 VZ_{262}	2 November 2010	Mount Lemmon Survey	Mount Lemmon	5.139	0.030	8.6	4.985	5.293	7.8 km	–	catalog · MPC · JPL
(686521) 2010 WZ_{18}	12 November 2010	Spacewatch	Kitt Peak	5.299	0.081	6.8	4.869	5.729	6.5 km	–	catalog · MPC · JPL
(686589) 2010 XY_{111}	13 December 2010	Mount Lemmon Survey	Mount Lemmon	5.196	0.073	11.6	4.819	5.573	6.6 km	–	catalog · MPC · JPL
(686593) 2010 XO_{115}	14 December 2010	Mount Lemmon Survey	Mount Lemmon	5.255	0.125	9.5	4.596	5.914	6.1 km	–	catalog · MPC · JPL
(686656) 2011 AV_{94}	13 January 2011	Mount Lemmon Survey	Mount Lemmon	5.281	0.099	21.0	4.760	5.802	7.9 km	–	catalog · MPC · JPL
(687660) 2011 WF_{164}	12 March 2013	Mount Lemmon Survey	Mount Lemmon	5.243	0.149	10.0	4.464	6.023	6.4 km	–	catalog · MPC · JPL
(687769) 2012 AR_{38}	4 January 2012	Mount Lemmon Survey	Mount Lemmon	5.215	0.087	17.5	4.764	5.667	5.9 km	–	catalog · MPC · JPL
(687868) 2012 BB_{181}	26 January 2012	Pan-STARRS	Haleakala	5.165	0.021	8.8	5.056	5.274	6.5 km	–	catalog · MPC · JPL
(687878) 2012 BA_{188}	20 January 2012	Spacewatch	Kitt Peak	5.158	0.043	10.7	4.936	5.381	6.5 km	–	catalog · MPC · JPL
(687929) 2012 CF_{75}	1 February 2012	Mount Lemmon Survey	Mount Lemmon	5.330	0.070	1.9	4.958	5.703	5.4 km	–	catalog · MPC · JPL
(688844) 2013 AS_{64}	10 January 2013	Pan-STARRS	Haleakala	5.248	0.021	6.5	5.137	5.360	6.7 km	–	catalog · MPC · JPL
(688858) 2013 AS_{106}	10 January 2013	Pan-STARRS	Haleakala	5.218	0.109	8.6	4.650	5.785	7.0 km	–	catalog · MPC · JPL
(688908) 2013 BD_{1}	17 October 2009	Mount Lemmon Survey	Mount Lemmon	5.182	0.031	6.1	5.022	5.342	7.2 km	–	catalog · MPC · JPL
(688920) 2013 BE_{17}	25 September 2009	Spacewatch	Kitt Peak	5.215	0.016	7.8	5.133	5.296	7.4 km	–	catalog · MPC · JPL
(688949) 2013 BX_{55}	29 October 2010	Mount Lemmon Survey	Mount Lemmon	5.176	0.048	3.6	4.927	5.426	6.9 km	–	catalog · MPC · JPL
(688990) 2013 BU_{106}	20 January 2013	Spacewatch	Kitt Peak	5.119	0.050	8.1	4.865	5.373	6.0 km	–	catalog · MPC · JPL
(689011) 2013 CW_{42}	5 February 2013	Spacewatch	Kitt Peak	5.194	0.079	8.5	4.781	5.606	5.7 km	–	catalog · MPC · JPL
(689063) 2013 CP_{145}	14 February 2013	Spacewatch	Kitt Peak	5.170	0.065	11.8	4.832	5.508	6.6 km	–	catalog · MPC · JPL
(689072) 2013 CQ_{154}	10 August 2007	Spacewatch	Kitt Peak	5.200	0.016	7.1	5.115	5.284	6.2 km	–	catalog · MPC · JPL
(689120) 2013 CL_{219}	9 February 2013	Pan-STARRS	Haleakala	5.153	0.057	4.7	4.860	5.446	6.0 km	–	catalog · MPC · JPL
(689121) 2013 CC_{220}	6 November 2010	Mount Lemmon Survey	Mount Lemmon	5.283	0.108	4.3	4.711	5.856	6.3 km	–	catalog · MPC · JPL
(689155) 2013 CV_{243}	20 January 2012	Mount Lemmon Survey	Mount Lemmon	5.221	0.071	5.5	4.851	5.592	6.0 km	–	catalog · MPC · JPL
(689160) 2013 CD_{251}	5 February 2013	Mount Lemmon Survey	Mount Lemmon	5.157	0.052	12.3	4.891	5.424	6.6 km	–	catalog · MPC · JPL
(690221) 2014 CZ_{32}	10 February 2014	Pan-STARRS	Haleakala	5.116	0.084	19.7	4.685	5.547	7.3 km	–	catalog · MPC · JPL
(690257) 2014 DA_{92}	10 January 2013	Pan-STARRS	Haleakala	5.285	0.050	3.8	5.021	5.548	6.1 km	–	catalog · MPC · JPL
(690259) 2014 DY_{92}	9 February 2014	Pan-STARRS	Haleakala	5.247	0.086	5.9	4.795	5.700	6.8 km	–	catalog · MPC · JPL
(690267) 2014 DH_{102}	27 February 2014	Mount Lemmon Survey	Mount Lemmon	5.086	0.022	1.7	4.977	5.196	6.3 km	–	catalog · MPC · JPL
(690291) 2014 DT_{168}	28 February 2014	Pan-STARRS	Haleakala	5.314	0.094	7.8	4.816	5.813	7.5 km	–	catalog · MPC · JPL
(690314) 2014 DN_{191}	26 February 2014	Pan-STARRS	Haleakala	5.210	0.055	7.6	4.922	5.498	6.2 km	–	catalog · MPC · JPL
(690386) 2014 EV_{198}	18 September 2009	Spacewatch	Kitt Peak	5.134	0.053	6.0	4.862	5.406	6.7 km	–	catalog · MPC · JPL
(690395) 2014 EU_{238}	13 October 2010	Mount Lemmon Survey	Mount Lemmon	5.177	0.034	9.9	4.999	5.355	7.0 km	–	catalog · MPC · JPL
(690404) 2014 EM_{257}	11 March 2014	Mount Lemmon Survey	Mount Lemmon	5.197	0.067	14.5	4.848	5.547	6.3 km	–	catalog · MPC · JPL
(690409) 2014 FZ_{13}	20 March 2014	Mount Lemmon Survey	Mount Lemmon	5.159	0.082	20.6	4.737	5.581	6.9 km	–	catalog · MPC · JPL
(690430) 2014 FN_{88}	23 March 2014	Mount Lemmon Survey	Mount Lemmon	5.178	0.082	12.0	4.756	5.600	7.2 km	–	catalog · MPC · JPL
(693054) 2015 DG_{135}	17 February 2015	Pan-STARRS	Haleakala	5.279	0.028	16.9	5.130	5.428	8.4 km	–	catalog · MPC · JPL
(693398) 2015 FB_{426}	25 March 2015	Pan-STARRS	Haleakala	5.298	0.044	16.5	5.067	5.529	6.8 km	–	catalog · MPC · JPL
(693421) 2015 FR_{459}	25 April 2004	Spacewatch	Kitt Peak	5.174	0.114	3.9	4.586	5.763	6.5 km	–	catalog · MPC · JPL
(693525) 2015 HL_{118}	16 September 2009	Spacewatch	Kitt Peak	5.171	0.058	8.1	4.871	5.471	6.1 km	–	catalog · MPC · JPL
(693536) 2015 HU_{135}	16 February 2013	Mount Lemmon Survey	Mount Lemmon	5.243	0.067	11.8	4.889	5.597	6.5 km	–	catalog · MPC · JPL
(693644) 2015 KF_{67}	25 September 2008	Spacewatch	Kitt Peak	5.195	0.075	21.0	4.808	5.582	6.5 km	–	catalog · MPC · JPL
(696302) 2016 GD_{174}	30 November 2011	Mount Lemmon Survey	Mount Lemmon	5.169	0.001	7.9	5.161	5.177	6.7 km	–	catalog · MPC · JPL
(698720) 2018 NR_{29}	8 July 2018	Pan-STARRS	Haleakala	5.192	0.093	7.7	4.710	5.675	5.6 km	–	catalog · MPC · JPL
(698738) 2018 PP_{72}	28 February 2014	Pan-STARRS	Haleakala	5.216	0.025	6.9	5.087	5.344	6.5 km	–	catalog · MPC · JPL
(699314) 2019 NJ_{48}	1 July 2019	Pan-STARRS	Haleakala	5.187	0.102	20.1	4.655	5.718	7.7 km	–	catalog · MPC · JPL
(699326) 2019 OH_{26}	25 July 2019	Pan-STARRS	Haleakala	5.252	0.049	23.0	4.997	5.507	9.1 km	–	catalog · MPC · JPL
(699338) 2019 QU_{34}	15 February 2013	Pan-STARRS	Haleakala	5.190	0.005	13.7	5.166	5.215	6.5 km	–	catalog · MPC · JPL
(699340) 2019 QK_{74}	21 September 2009	Mount Lemmon Survey	Mount Lemmon	5.287	0.062	1.6	4.957	5.617	6.1 km	–	catalog · MPC · JPL
(699356) 2019 TG_{43}	23 April 2014	Pan-STARRS	Haleakala	5.171	0.003	18.5	5.155	5.188	6.8 km	–	catalog · MPC · JPL
(699684) 2020 RW_{87}	19 April 2015	CTIO-DECam	Cerro Tololo-DECam	5.137	0.085	6.3	4.700	5.573	5.5 km	–	catalog · MPC · JPL
(699685) 2020 RE_{88}	26 January 2012	Mount Lemmon Survey	Mount Lemmon	5.265	0.066	11.7	4.917	5.612	5.9 km	–	catalog · MPC · JPL
(699688) 2020 RK_{101}	13 November 2010	Mount Lemmon Survey	Mount Lemmon	5.129	0.031	6.1	4.971	5.287	6.5 km	–	catalog · MPC · JPL
(699693) 2020 RX_{120}	13 September 2020	Pan-STARRS	Haleakala	5.136	0.069	7.0	4.780	5.491	5.9 km	–	catalog · MPC · JPL
(699706) 2020 TL_{65}	23 April 2014	CTIO-DECam	Cerro Tololo-DECam	5.173	0.067	3.6	4.825	5.521	5.8 km	–	catalog · MPC · JPL
(699901) 2021 TS_{70}	28 February 2014	Pan-STARRS	Haleakala	5.192	0.023	13.4	5.072	5.311	6.9 km	–	catalog · MPC · JPL
(699939) 2021 VZ	26 February 2014	Pan-STARRS	Haleakala	5.256	0.052	9.0	4.981	5.531	6.8 km	–	catalog · MPC · JPL

back to top
