= List of minor planets: 687001–688000 =

The following is a partial list of minor planets, running from minor-planet number 687001 through 688000, inclusive. The primary data for this and other partial lists is based on JPL's "Small-Body Orbital Elements" and data available from the Minor Planet Center. Critical list information is also provided by the MPC, unless otherwise specified from Lowell Observatory. A detailed description of the table's columns and additional sources are given on the main page including a complete list of every page in this series, and a statistical break-up on the dynamical classification of minor planets.

Also see the summary list of all named bodies in numerical and alphabetical order, and the corresponding naming citations for the number range of this particular list. New namings may only be added to this list after official publication, as the preannouncement of names is condemned by the Working Group for Small Bodies Nomenclature of the International Astronomical Union.

Near-Earth obj.	MBA (inner)	MBA (outer)	Centaur
Mars-crosser	MBA (middle)	Jupiter trojan	Trans-Neptunian obj.
Unclassified

== 687001–687100 ==
Designation			Discovery			Properties		Ref
Permanent	Provisional	Named after	Date	Site	Discoverer(s)	Category	Diam.	Ref
687001	2011 GF_{106}	—	April 5, 2011	Kitt Peak	Spacewatch	·	1.1 km	MPC · JPL
687002	2011 GG_{106}	—	April 13, 2011	Kitt Peak	Spacewatch	·	1.0 km	MPC · JPL
687003	2011 GF_{110}	—	April 1, 2011	Mount Lemmon	Mount Lemmon Survey	·	440 m	MPC · JPL
687004	2011 HM_{6}	—	April 26, 2011	Tzec Maun	E. Schwab	(1547)	1.5 km	MPC · JPL
687005	2011 HA_{7}	—	April 24, 2011	Kitt Peak	Spacewatch	JUN	830 m	MPC · JPL
687006	2011 HA_{8}	—	April 28, 2011	Mount Lemmon	Mount Lemmon Survey	H	320 m	MPC · JPL
687007	2011 HS_{9}	—	April 6, 2011	Mount Lemmon	Mount Lemmon Survey	·	1.5 km	MPC · JPL
687008	2011 HT_{9}	—	April 6, 2011	Mount Lemmon	Mount Lemmon Survey	·	1.2 km	MPC · JPL
687009	2011 HY_{11}	—	April 22, 2011	Kitt Peak	Spacewatch	·	1.2 km	MPC · JPL
687010	2011 HO_{12}	—	April 10, 2005	Mount Lemmon	Mount Lemmon Survey	·	2.8 km	MPC · JPL
687011	2011 HV_{15}	—	April 24, 2011	Mount Lemmon	Mount Lemmon Survey	·	1.3 km	MPC · JPL
687012	2011 HL_{16}	—	April 24, 2011	Mount Lemmon	Mount Lemmon Survey	ADE	1.3 km	MPC · JPL
687013	2011 HM_{18}	—	April 26, 2011	Mount Lemmon	Mount Lemmon Survey	·	700 m	MPC · JPL
687014	2011 HZ_{21}	—	April 5, 2003	Kitt Peak	Spacewatch	·	940 m	MPC · JPL
687015	2011 HU_{28}	—	March 27, 2011	Kitt Peak	Spacewatch	·	1.2 km	MPC · JPL
687016	2011 HK_{34}	—	February 26, 2004	Kitt Peak	Deep Ecliptic Survey	·	650 m	MPC · JPL
687017	2011 HA_{40}	—	April 11, 2011	Mount Lemmon	Mount Lemmon Survey	·	3.1 km	MPC · JPL
687018	2011 HG_{41}	—	November 19, 2008	Catalina	CSS	EUN	1.2 km	MPC · JPL
687019	2011 HA_{43}	—	April 6, 2011	Mount Lemmon	Mount Lemmon Survey	·	670 m	MPC · JPL
687020	2011 HD_{44}	—	September 28, 2008	Mount Lemmon	Mount Lemmon Survey	·	1.3 km	MPC · JPL
687021	2011 HA_{48}	—	February 11, 2002	Kitt Peak	Spacewatch	·	1.3 km	MPC · JPL
687022	2011 HU_{51}	—	September 19, 1998	Apache Point	SDSS	·	810 m	MPC · JPL
687023	2011 HX_{52}	—	April 6, 2011	Mount Lemmon	Mount Lemmon Survey	·	1.2 km	MPC · JPL
687024	2011 HW_{55}	—	April 27, 2011	Mount Lemmon	Mount Lemmon Survey	·	1.5 km	MPC · JPL
687025	2011 HT_{61}	—	April 28, 2011	Haleakala	Pan-STARRS 1	H	310 m	MPC · JPL
687026	2011 HH_{69}	—	April 23, 2011	Haleakala	Pan-STARRS 1	·	1.3 km	MPC · JPL
687027	2011 HD_{70}	—	April 24, 2011	Mount Lemmon	Mount Lemmon Survey	·	1.3 km	MPC · JPL
687028	2011 HR_{70}	—	March 13, 2011	Mount Lemmon	Mount Lemmon Survey	·	1.6 km	MPC · JPL
687029	2011 HX_{73}	—	December 11, 2009	Mount Lemmon	Mount Lemmon Survey	·	1.4 km	MPC · JPL
687030	2011 HC_{80}	—	April 30, 2011	Mount Lemmon	Mount Lemmon Survey	H	380 m	MPC · JPL
687031	2011 HB_{82}	—	March 1, 2011	Mount Lemmon	Mount Lemmon Survey	·	1.4 km	MPC · JPL
687032	2011 HM_{85}	—	April 23, 2011	Haleakala	Pan-STARRS 1	·	850 m	MPC · JPL
687033	2011 HZ_{89}	—	April 6, 2011	Mount Lemmon	Mount Lemmon Survey	·	2.7 km	MPC · JPL
687034	2011 HW_{90}	—	April 2, 2011	Kitt Peak	Spacewatch	·	1.3 km	MPC · JPL
687035	2011 HA_{91}	—	April 3, 2011	Haleakala	Pan-STARRS 1	·	1.2 km	MPC · JPL
687036	2011 HN_{91}	—	March 25, 2011	Kitt Peak	Spacewatch	THM	2.1 km	MPC · JPL
687037	2011 HW_{92}	—	April 25, 2011	Mount Lemmon	Mount Lemmon Survey	·	1.3 km	MPC · JPL
687038	2011 HM_{94}	—	March 14, 2011	Kitt Peak	Spacewatch	THM	2.2 km	MPC · JPL
687039	2011 HH_{102}	—	April 30, 2011	Mount Lemmon	Mount Lemmon Survey	·	1.3 km	MPC · JPL
687040	2011 HY_{103}	—	April 22, 2011	Kitt Peak	Spacewatch	HYG	2.9 km	MPC · JPL
687041	2011 HE_{104}	—	April 30, 2011	Mount Lemmon	Mount Lemmon Survey	·	1.2 km	MPC · JPL
687042	2011 HH_{106}	—	April 24, 2011	Kitt Peak	Spacewatch	·	1.3 km	MPC · JPL
687043	2011 HL_{107}	—	November 7, 2012	Mount Lemmon	Mount Lemmon Survey	·	550 m	MPC · JPL
687044	2011 HH_{108}	—	October 10, 2015	Haleakala	Pan-STARRS 1	·	470 m	MPC · JPL
687045	2011 HR_{108}	—	September 26, 2017	Haleakala	Pan-STARRS 1	·	1.2 km	MPC · JPL
687046	2011 HD_{109}	—	March 21, 2015	Mount Lemmon	Mount Lemmon Survey	·	1.1 km	MPC · JPL
687047	2011 HM_{110}	—	April 28, 2011	Catalina	CSS	·	720 m	MPC · JPL
687048	2011 HY_{111}	—	April 27, 2011	Kitt Peak	Spacewatch	·	1.3 km	MPC · JPL
687049	2011 HU_{113}	—	March 13, 2011	Mount Lemmon	Mount Lemmon Survey	·	420 m	MPC · JPL
687050	2011 JE_{2}	—	May 1, 2011	Bergisch Gladbach	W. Bickel	·	1.4 km	MPC · JPL
687051	2011 JP_{6}	—	May 3, 2011	Kitt Peak	Spacewatch	PHO	960 m	MPC · JPL
687052	2011 JV_{8}	—	May 1, 2011	Haleakala	Pan-STARRS 1	·	1.5 km	MPC · JPL
687053	2011 JP_{13}	—	April 30, 2011	Haleakala	Pan-STARRS 1	HNS	1.1 km	MPC · JPL
687054	2011 JS_{16}	—	March 26, 2011	Kitt Peak	Spacewatch	EUN	940 m	MPC · JPL
687055	2011 JM_{20}	—	September 6, 2008	Mount Lemmon	Mount Lemmon Survey	·	1.4 km	MPC · JPL
687056	2011 JT_{23}	—	May 1, 2011	Haleakala	Pan-STARRS 1	·	1.4 km	MPC · JPL
687057	2011 JV_{33}	—	May 8, 2011	Mount Lemmon	Mount Lemmon Survey	JUN	840 m	MPC · JPL
687058	2011 JZ_{33}	—	December 13, 2013	Mount Lemmon	Mount Lemmon Survey	·	1.5 km	MPC · JPL
687059	2011 JB_{34}	—	December 14, 2013	Mount Lemmon	Mount Lemmon Survey	·	1.5 km	MPC · JPL
687060	2011 JA_{36}	—	October 8, 2015	Haleakala	Pan-STARRS 1	·	530 m	MPC · JPL
687061	2011 JH_{37}	—	May 6, 2011	Mount Lemmon	Mount Lemmon Survey	·	1.3 km	MPC · JPL
687062	2011 JM_{37}	—	May 1, 2011	Haleakala	Pan-STARRS 1	EUN	1.1 km	MPC · JPL
687063	2011 KP	—	May 21, 2011	Mount Lemmon	Mount Lemmon Survey	H	350 m	MPC · JPL
687064	2011 KH_{1}	—	April 26, 2011	Kitt Peak	Spacewatch	·	1.3 km	MPC · JPL
687065	2011 KR_{1}	—	July 6, 2003	Kitt Peak	Spacewatch	·	1.5 km	MPC · JPL
687066	2011 KN_{4}	—	October 8, 2004	Palomar	NEAT	H	600 m	MPC · JPL
687067	2011 KN_{7}	—	May 21, 2011	Mount Lemmon	Mount Lemmon Survey	·	1.2 km	MPC · JPL
687068	2011 KZ_{13}	—	September 7, 2004	Socorro	LINEAR	·	1.5 km	MPC · JPL
687069	2011 KP_{30}	—	May 23, 2011	Mount Lemmon	Mount Lemmon Survey	·	540 m	MPC · JPL
687070	2011 KN_{33}	—	April 9, 2002	Palomar	NEAT	·	1.3 km	MPC · JPL
687071	2011 KT_{36}	—	May 12, 2011	Mount Lemmon	Mount Lemmon Survey	THM	2.3 km	MPC · JPL
687072	2011 KS_{38}	—	September 15, 2003	Palomar	NEAT	EUN	1.1 km	MPC · JPL
687073	2011 KG_{40}	—	May 24, 2011	Haleakala	Pan-STARRS 1	EUN	1.1 km	MPC · JPL
687074	2011 KE_{41}	—	September 23, 2008	Kitt Peak	Spacewatch	·	1.1 km	MPC · JPL
687075	2011 KH_{44}	—	April 5, 2011	Mount Lemmon	Mount Lemmon Survey	·	1.4 km	MPC · JPL
687076	2011 KO_{50}	—	July 24, 2003	Palomar	NEAT	·	1.1 km	MPC · JPL
687077	2011 KU_{50}	—	May 22, 2011	Mount Lemmon	Mount Lemmon Survey	H	350 m	MPC · JPL
687078	2011 KV_{50}	—	November 27, 2013	Haleakala	Pan-STARRS 1	PAD	1.1 km	MPC · JPL
687079	2011 KE_{51}	—	April 10, 2015	Mount Lemmon	Mount Lemmon Survey	HNS	780 m	MPC · JPL
687080	2011 KF_{51}	—	May 21, 2011	Mount Lemmon	Mount Lemmon Survey	·	1.7 km	MPC · JPL
687081	2011 KS_{51}	—	July 4, 2016	Haleakala	Pan-STARRS 1	·	1.2 km	MPC · JPL
687082	2011 KN_{52}	—	May 25, 2011	Kitt Peak	Spacewatch	HNS	1.1 km	MPC · JPL
687083	2011 KT_{54}	—	February 27, 2014	Kitt Peak	Spacewatch	·	540 m	MPC · JPL
687084	2011 KJ_{56}	—	May 22, 2011	Mount Lemmon	Mount Lemmon Survey	·	1.6 km	MPC · JPL
687085	2011 KC_{57}	—	May 24, 2011	Mount Lemmon	Mount Lemmon Survey	·	1.4 km	MPC · JPL
687086	2011 KD_{59}	—	May 26, 2011	Mount Lemmon	Mount Lemmon Survey	HNS	960 m	MPC · JPL
687087	2011 KH_{59}	—	May 28, 2011	Kitt Peak	Spacewatch	H	370 m	MPC · JPL
687088	2011 LZ_{1}	—	June 3, 2011	Mount Lemmon	Mount Lemmon Survey	·	1.5 km	MPC · JPL
687089	2011 LT_{3}	—	June 4, 2011	Mount Lemmon	Mount Lemmon Survey	MRX	770 m	MPC · JPL
687090	2011 LW_{9}	—	October 2, 2008	Kitt Peak	Spacewatch	·	1.2 km	MPC · JPL
687091	2011 LH_{10}	—	June 4, 2011	Mount Lemmon	Mount Lemmon Survey	·	1.2 km	MPC · JPL
687092	2011 LY_{12}	—	June 7, 2011	Haleakala	Pan-STARRS 1	·	1.3 km	MPC · JPL
687093	2011 LK_{15}	—	October 29, 2008	Kitt Peak	Spacewatch	URS	3.5 km	MPC · JPL
687094	2011 LA_{16}	—	June 8, 2011	Mount Lemmon	Mount Lemmon Survey	·	1.2 km	MPC · JPL
687095	2011 LH_{18}	—	July 22, 2007	Lulin	LUSS	·	1.8 km	MPC · JPL
687096	2011 LU_{23}	—	May 14, 2011	Mount Lemmon	Mount Lemmon Survey	·	470 m	MPC · JPL
687097	2011 LB_{24}	—	February 2, 2006	Kitt Peak	Spacewatch	·	1.2 km	MPC · JPL
687098	2011 LO_{24}	—	June 6, 2011	Haleakala	Pan-STARRS 1	·	1.3 km	MPC · JPL
687099	2011 LD_{26}	—	October 10, 2004	Kitt Peak	Spacewatch	·	1.1 km	MPC · JPL
687100	2011 LF_{30}	—	October 21, 2012	Nogales	M. Schwartz, P. R. Holvorcem	·	1.4 km	MPC · JPL

== 687101–687200 ==
back to top

Designation			Discovery			Properties		Ref
Permanent	Provisional	Named after	Date	Site	Discoverer(s)	Category	Diam.	Ref
687101	2011 LP_{30}	—	December 4, 2012	Mount Lemmon	Mount Lemmon Survey	·	1.4 km	MPC · JPL
687102	2011 LX_{31}	—	June 3, 2011	Mount Lemmon	Mount Lemmon Survey	·	520 m	MPC · JPL
687103	2011 LH_{34}	—	June 4, 2011	Mount Lemmon	Mount Lemmon Survey	·	1.3 km	MPC · JPL
687104	2011 MA_{8}	—	June 24, 2011	Kitt Peak	Spacewatch	H	460 m	MPC · JPL
687105	2011 MG_{10}	—	June 30, 2011	Haleakala	Pan-STARRS 1	·	1.9 km	MPC · JPL
687106	2011 NJ_{6}	—	July 2, 2011	Kitt Peak	Spacewatch	GEF	1.0 km	MPC · JPL
687107	2011 NU_{6}	—	July 1, 2011	Kitt Peak	Spacewatch	·	1.5 km	MPC · JPL
687108	2011 ON_{1}	—	October 3, 2002	Palomar	NEAT	DOR	2.4 km	MPC · JPL
687109	2011 OF_{6}	—	July 25, 2011	Haleakala	Pan-STARRS 1	·	800 m	MPC · JPL
687110	2011 OJ_{17}	—	July 29, 2011	Haleakala	Pan-STARRS 1	·	1.7 km	MPC · JPL
687111	2011 ON_{18}	—	July 26, 2011	Haleakala	Pan-STARRS 1	H	390 m	MPC · JPL
687112	2011 OP_{19}	—	June 26, 2011	Mount Lemmon	Mount Lemmon Survey	·	1.6 km	MPC · JPL
687113	2011 OR_{22}	—	July 26, 2011	Haleakala	Pan-STARRS 1	·	2.3 km	MPC · JPL
687114	2011 OQ_{24}	—	July 21, 2011	Charleston	R. Holmes	·	950 m	MPC · JPL
687115	2011 OR_{27}	—	June 22, 2011	Mount Lemmon	Mount Lemmon Survey	MAR	860 m	MPC · JPL
687116	2011 OW_{28}	—	July 28, 2011	Haleakala	Pan-STARRS 1	·	1.8 km	MPC · JPL
687117	2011 OR_{29}	—	July 26, 2011	Haleakala	Pan-STARRS 1	BRA	1.5 km	MPC · JPL
687118	2011 OY_{31}	—	July 31, 2011	Haleakala	Pan-STARRS 1	·	650 m	MPC · JPL
687119	2011 OF_{33}	—	October 10, 2008	Mount Lemmon	Mount Lemmon Survey	·	590 m	MPC · JPL
687120	2011 OT_{33}	—	June 22, 2011	Mount Lemmon	Mount Lemmon Survey	·	1.1 km	MPC · JPL
687121	2011 OU_{36}	—	August 1, 2011	Haleakala	Pan-STARRS 1	·	1.6 km	MPC · JPL
687122	2011 OM_{38}	—	July 28, 2011	Haleakala	Pan-STARRS 1	AEO	1.0 km	MPC · JPL
687123	2011 OF_{41}	—	February 1, 2009	Mount Lemmon	Mount Lemmon Survey	·	1.6 km	MPC · JPL
687124	2011 OO_{42}	—	August 24, 2008	Kitt Peak	Spacewatch	·	640 m	MPC · JPL
687125	2011 OK_{50}	—	September 9, 2007	Mount Lemmon	Mount Lemmon Survey	AST	1.4 km	MPC · JPL
687126	2011 OW_{55}	—	September 22, 2008	Kitt Peak	Spacewatch	·	550 m	MPC · JPL
687127	2011 OW_{57}	—	July 31, 2011	Haleakala	Pan-STARRS 1	·	510 m	MPC · JPL
687128	2011 OU_{61}	—	April 24, 2014	Haleakala	Pan-STARRS 1	·	600 m	MPC · JPL
687129	2011 OE_{63}	—	January 11, 2014	Mount Lemmon	Mount Lemmon Survey	·	920 m	MPC · JPL
687130	2011 OC_{66}	—	October 10, 2012	Haleakala	Pan-STARRS 1	·	2.7 km	MPC · JPL
687131	2011 OC_{68}	—	July 28, 2011	Haleakala	Pan-STARRS 1	·	1.4 km	MPC · JPL
687132	2011 OQ_{68}	—	May 21, 2015	Haleakala	Pan-STARRS 1	·	1.7 km	MPC · JPL
687133	2011 OY_{68}	—	December 4, 2012	Kitt Peak	Spacewatch	PHO	850 m	MPC · JPL
687134	2011 OH_{69}	—	March 28, 2015	Haleakala	Pan-STARRS 1	·	1.5 km	MPC · JPL
687135	2011 OW_{69}	—	July 28, 2011	Haleakala	Pan-STARRS 1	·	1.4 km	MPC · JPL
687136	2011 OM_{74}	—	July 25, 2011	Haleakala	Pan-STARRS 1	KOR	1.1 km	MPC · JPL
687137	2011 OV_{75}	—	July 27, 2011	Haleakala	Pan-STARRS 1	HOF	2.0 km	MPC · JPL
687138	2011 PV_{4}	—	August 2, 2011	La Sagra	OAM	·	1.3 km	MPC · JPL
687139	2011 PH_{17}	—	December 22, 2012	Haleakala	Pan-STARRS 1	·	540 m	MPC · JPL
687140	2011 PS_{19}	—	May 4, 2016	Haleakala	Pan-STARRS 1	H	440 m	MPC · JPL
687141	2011 PB_{20}	—	January 18, 2018	Haleakala	Pan-STARRS 1	·	1.3 km	MPC · JPL
687142	2011 PL_{21}	—	October 22, 2011	Mount Lemmon	Mount Lemmon Survey	·	1.3 km	MPC · JPL
687143	2011 PU_{22}	—	August 10, 2011	Haleakala	Pan-STARRS 1	·	1.5 km	MPC · JPL
687144	2011 PB_{23}	—	September 30, 2016	Haleakala	Pan-STARRS 1	EOS	1.2 km	MPC · JPL
687145	2011 QT_{1}	—	November 15, 2007	Mount Lemmon	Mount Lemmon Survey	·	1.5 km	MPC · JPL
687146	2011 QS_{3}	—	August 18, 2011	Haleakala	Pan-STARRS 1	·	1.5 km	MPC · JPL
687147	2011 QL_{7}	—	July 28, 2011	Haleakala	Pan-STARRS 1	MRX	770 m	MPC · JPL
687148	2011 QD_{8}	—	August 22, 2011	Haleakala	Pan-STARRS 1	H	340 m	MPC · JPL
687149	2011 QS_{25}	—	April 29, 2006	Kitt Peak	Spacewatch	·	1.3 km	MPC · JPL
687150	2011 QF_{33}	—	August 23, 2011	Haleakala	Pan-STARRS 1	·	1.5 km	MPC · JPL
687151	2011 QY_{33}	—	November 24, 2008	Kitt Peak	Spacewatch	·	610 m	MPC · JPL
687152	2011 QU_{38}	—	March 12, 2002	Palomar	NEAT	·	1.4 km	MPC · JPL
687153	2011 QP_{41}	—	May 7, 2011	Mount Lemmon	Mount Lemmon Survey	·	1.9 km	MPC · JPL
687154	2011 QT_{47}	—	August 31, 2011	Haleakala	Pan-STARRS 1	L5	6.9 km	MPC · JPL
687155	2011 QW_{48}	—	August 24, 2011	Haleakala	Pan-STARRS 1	·	1.5 km	MPC · JPL
687156	2011 QO_{50}	—	August 24, 2011	Haleakala	Pan-STARRS 1	KOR	960 m	MPC · JPL
687157	2011 QT_{52}	—	August 29, 2011	Siding Spring	SSS	·	1.5 km	MPC · JPL
687158	2011 QU_{57}	—	August 30, 2011	Haleakala	Pan-STARRS 1	DOR	1.5 km	MPC · JPL
687159	2011 QQ_{61}	—	August 31, 2011	Haleakala	Pan-STARRS 1	·	760 m	MPC · JPL
687160	2011 QS_{67}	—	June 8, 2011	Haleakala	Pan-STARRS 1	·	1.5 km	MPC · JPL
687161	2011 QF_{71}	—	August 27, 2011	Haleakala	Pan-STARRS 1	·	740 m	MPC · JPL
687162	2011 QK_{75}	—	August 21, 2011	Haleakala	Pan-STARRS 1	·	1.4 km	MPC · JPL
687163	2011 QF_{79}	—	September 28, 2008	Mount Lemmon	Mount Lemmon Survey	·	650 m	MPC · JPL
687164	2011 QR_{81}	—	August 24, 2011	Haleakala	Pan-STARRS 1	·	570 m	MPC · JPL
687165	2011 QD_{83}	—	January 17, 2009	Kitt Peak	Spacewatch	·	1.7 km	MPC · JPL
687166	2011 QN_{83}	—	January 20, 2009	Kitt Peak	Spacewatch	·	1.4 km	MPC · JPL
687167	2011 QZ_{94}	—	August 31, 2011	Haleakala	Pan-STARRS 1	·	1.3 km	MPC · JPL
687168	2011 QV_{95}	—	July 31, 2011	Mayhill-ISON	L. Elenin	·	580 m	MPC · JPL
687169	2011 QO_{97}	—	August 31, 2011	Haleakala	Pan-STARRS 1	·	1.4 km	MPC · JPL
687170	2011 QF_{99}	—	August 29, 2011	Mauna Kea	Alexandersen, M.	UT	60 km	MPC · JPL
687171	2011 QU_{99}	—	August 27, 2011	Haleakala	Pan-STARRS 1	·	1.5 km	MPC · JPL
687172	2011 QC_{100}	—	August 27, 2011	Haleakala	Pan-STARRS 1	·	1.7 km	MPC · JPL
687173	2011 QZ_{101}	—	April 4, 2014	Mount Lemmon	Mount Lemmon Survey	·	1.8 km	MPC · JPL
687174	2011 QB_{102}	—	August 30, 2011	Haleakala	Pan-STARRS 1	BRA	1.2 km	MPC · JPL
687175	2011 QJ_{102}	—	March 28, 2015	Haleakala	Pan-STARRS 1	·	1.4 km	MPC · JPL
687176	2011 QQ_{102}	—	August 26, 2011	Piszkés-tető	K. Sárneczky, S. Kürti	·	1.8 km	MPC · JPL
687177	2011 QB_{103}	—	August 29, 2016	Mount Lemmon	Mount Lemmon Survey	·	1.7 km	MPC · JPL
687178	2011 QK_{106}	—	September 25, 2016	Haleakala	Pan-STARRS 1	·	1.7 km	MPC · JPL
687179	2011 QD_{110}	—	August 24, 2011	Haleakala	Pan-STARRS 1	MAS	580 m	MPC · JPL
687180	2011 QJ_{110}	—	August 27, 2011	Zelenchukskaya Stn	T. V. Krjačko, Satovski, B.	·	1.6 km	MPC · JPL
687181	2011 QL_{110}	—	August 27, 2011	Haleakala	Pan-STARRS 1	·	880 m	MPC · JPL
687182	2011 QZ_{110}	—	August 31, 2011	Haleakala	Pan-STARRS 1	·	1.5 km	MPC · JPL
687183	2011 QX_{114}	—	August 31, 2011	Haleakala	Pan-STARRS 1	·	490 m	MPC · JPL
687184	2011 QL_{116}	—	August 24, 2011	Haleakala	Pan-STARRS 1	KOR	1.1 km	MPC · JPL
687185	2011 QP_{116}	—	August 30, 2011	Kitt Peak	Spacewatch	KOR	1.1 km	MPC · JPL
687186	2011 RS_{5}	—	September 5, 2011	Haleakala	Pan-STARRS 1	·	1.4 km	MPC · JPL
687187	2011 RX_{6}	—	August 31, 2011	Haleakala	Pan-STARRS 1	·	500 m	MPC · JPL
687188	2011 RG_{9}	—	September 6, 2011	Haleakala	Pan-STARRS 1	·	1.4 km	MPC · JPL
687189	2011 RR_{13}	—	March 2, 2006	Kitt Peak	Spacewatch	·	840 m	MPC · JPL
687190	2011 RG_{15}	—	December 6, 2007	Mount Lemmon	Mount Lemmon Survey	·	1.4 km	MPC · JPL
687191	2011 RW_{17}	—	September 4, 2011	Haleakala	Pan-STARRS 1	KOR	1.0 km	MPC · JPL
687192	2011 RA_{21}	—	September 2, 2011	Haleakala	Pan-STARRS 1	KOR	1.0 km	MPC · JPL
687193	2011 RF_{21}	—	September 4, 2011	Haleakala	Pan-STARRS 1	V	400 m	MPC · JPL
687194	2011 RZ_{22}	—	January 20, 2013	Kitt Peak	Spacewatch	·	1.4 km	MPC · JPL
687195	2011 RD_{25}	—	January 3, 2013	Mount Lemmon	Mount Lemmon Survey	·	1.5 km	MPC · JPL
687196	2011 RF_{26}	—	September 2, 2011	Haleakala	Pan-STARRS 1	L5	7.0 km	MPC · JPL
687197	2011 RX_{27}	—	September 8, 2011	Kitt Peak	Spacewatch	·	660 m	MPC · JPL
687198	2011 RY_{27}	—	September 4, 2011	Haleakala	Pan-STARRS 1	EOS	1.6 km	MPC · JPL
687199	2011 RW_{29}	—	September 4, 2011	Haleakala	Pan-STARRS 1	·	1.5 km	MPC · JPL
687200	2011 RN_{30}	—	September 7, 2011	Kitt Peak	Spacewatch	·	2.0 km	MPC · JPL

== 687201–687300 ==
back to top

Designation			Discovery			Properties		Ref
Permanent	Provisional	Named after	Date	Site	Discoverer(s)	Category	Diam.	Ref
687201	2011 RF_{32}	—	September 4, 2011	Haleakala	Pan-STARRS 1	·	1.2 km	MPC · JPL
687202	2011 RF_{33}	—	September 4, 2011	Haleakala	Pan-STARRS 1	·	550 m	MPC · JPL
687203	2011 RM_{35}	—	September 2, 2011	Haleakala	Pan-STARRS 1	·	1.9 km	MPC · JPL
687204	2011 RX_{35}	—	September 4, 2011	Haleakala	Pan-STARRS 1	·	1.5 km	MPC · JPL
687205	2011 RV_{36}	—	September 2, 2011	Haleakala	Pan-STARRS 1	·	1.4 km	MPC · JPL
687206	2011 RN_{41}	—	September 4, 2011	Haleakala	Pan-STARRS 1	PHO	710 m	MPC · JPL
687207	2011 RK_{42}	—	September 2, 2011	Haleakala	Pan-STARRS 1	·	1.6 km	MPC · JPL
687208	2011 SV_{1}	—	August 20, 2011	Haleakala	Pan-STARRS 1	·	1.1 km	MPC · JPL
687209	2011 SL_{2}	—	September 2, 2011	Haleakala	Pan-STARRS 1	·	540 m	MPC · JPL
687210	2011 SW_{9}	—	March 3, 2009	Kitt Peak	Spacewatch	EOS	1.5 km	MPC · JPL
687211	2011 SW_{12}	—	September 19, 2011	Mount Lemmon	Mount Lemmon Survey	L5	6.2 km	MPC · JPL
687212	2011 SH_{20}	—	September 20, 2011	Haleakala	Pan-STARRS 1	·	2.9 km	MPC · JPL
687213	2011 SU_{20}	—	November 4, 2002	Palomar	NEAT	·	1.9 km	MPC · JPL
687214	2011 SD_{23}	—	September 18, 2011	Mount Lemmon	Mount Lemmon Survey	NYS	870 m	MPC · JPL
687215	2011 SO_{30}	—	September 20, 2011	Zelenchukskaya Stn	T. V. Krjačko, Satovski, B.	V	550 m	MPC · JPL
687216	2011 SU_{34}	—	August 26, 2011	Haleakala	Pan-STARRS 1	GEF	1.0 km	MPC · JPL
687217	2011 SW_{35}	—	September 20, 2011	Kitt Peak	Spacewatch	·	740 m	MPC · JPL
687218	2011 SX_{38}	—	September 21, 2011	Kitt Peak	Spacewatch	·	890 m	MPC · JPL
687219	2011 SE_{52}	—	September 18, 2011	Mount Lemmon	Mount Lemmon Survey	·	1.5 km	MPC · JPL
687220	2011 SN_{55}	—	September 23, 2011	Haleakala	Pan-STARRS 1	·	1.5 km	MPC · JPL
687221	2011 SG_{57}	—	September 23, 2011	Haleakala	Pan-STARRS 1	·	1.3 km	MPC · JPL
687222	2011 SW_{58}	—	October 31, 2007	Mount Lemmon	Mount Lemmon Survey	·	1.3 km	MPC · JPL
687223	2011 SC_{59}	—	September 18, 2011	Mount Lemmon	Mount Lemmon Survey	·	1.4 km	MPC · JPL
687224	2011 SP_{59}	—	September 18, 2011	Mount Lemmon	Mount Lemmon Survey	·	960 m	MPC · JPL
687225	2011 SP_{60}	—	September 19, 2011	Haleakala	Pan-STARRS 1	·	1.6 km	MPC · JPL
687226	2011 SH_{61}	—	August 29, 2011	Haleakala	Pan-STARRS 1	H	360 m	MPC · JPL
687227	2011 SH_{62}	—	September 21, 2011	Haleakala	Pan-STARRS 1	KOR	1.0 km	MPC · JPL
687228	2011 SX_{63}	—	September 19, 2011	Haleakala	Pan-STARRS 1	·	2.1 km	MPC · JPL
687229	2011 SO_{64}	—	September 23, 2011	Haleakala	Pan-STARRS 1	·	1.2 km	MPC · JPL
687230	2011 SV_{72}	—	February 19, 2009	Kitt Peak	Spacewatch	·	1.6 km	MPC · JPL
687231	2011 SV_{73}	—	November 3, 2007	Kitt Peak	Spacewatch	·	990 m	MPC · JPL
687232	2011 SG_{74}	—	September 19, 2011	Haleakala	Pan-STARRS 1	·	1.5 km	MPC · JPL
687233	2011 SY_{78}	—	September 20, 2011	Mount Lemmon	Mount Lemmon Survey	·	1.7 km	MPC · JPL
687234	2011 SJ_{90}	—	September 22, 2011	Kitt Peak	Spacewatch	DOR	2.0 km	MPC · JPL
687235	2011 SJ_{92}	—	December 21, 2006	Catalina	CSS	·	2.7 km	MPC · JPL
687236	2011 SD_{93}	—	December 5, 2007	Kitt Peak	Spacewatch	AGN	900 m	MPC · JPL
687237	2011 SW_{93}	—	September 11, 2004	Kitt Peak	Spacewatch	(2076)	680 m	MPC · JPL
687238	2011 SF_{95}	—	January 29, 2009	Mount Lemmon	Mount Lemmon Survey	·	980 m	MPC · JPL
687239	2011 SH_{95}	—	September 4, 2011	Haleakala	Pan-STARRS 1	KOR	1.1 km	MPC · JPL
687240	2011 SE_{101}	—	September 24, 2011	Mount Lemmon	Mount Lemmon Survey	KOR	1.0 km	MPC · JPL
687241	2011 SR_{101}	—	September 24, 2011	Mount Lemmon	Mount Lemmon Survey	·	940 m	MPC · JPL
687242	2011 SW_{113}	—	August 31, 2011	Siding Spring	SSS	·	2.0 km	MPC · JPL
687243	2011 SQ_{117}	—	March 9, 2002	Kitt Peak	Spacewatch	·	870 m	MPC · JPL
687244	2011 SJ_{118}	—	August 9, 2004	Siding Spring	SSS	·	790 m	MPC · JPL
687245	2011 SX_{119}	—	September 8, 2011	Kitt Peak	Spacewatch	·	550 m	MPC · JPL
687246	2011 SJ_{122}	—	October 24, 2003	Kitt Peak	Spacewatch	·	1.1 km	MPC · JPL
687247	2011 SQ_{124}	—	September 23, 2011	Haleakala	Pan-STARRS 1	NYS	980 m	MPC · JPL
687248	2011 SP_{128}	—	August 29, 2006	Kitt Peak	Spacewatch	·	1.4 km	MPC · JPL
687249	2011 SD_{129}	—	September 20, 2011	Kitt Peak	Spacewatch	·	1.4 km	MPC · JPL
687250	2011 SG_{137}	—	April 20, 2007	Kitt Peak	Spacewatch	·	520 m	MPC · JPL
687251	2011 SQ_{137}	—	September 4, 2011	Haleakala	Pan-STARRS 1	NYS	730 m	MPC · JPL
687252	2011 SZ_{138}	—	September 30, 2006	Mount Lemmon	Mount Lemmon Survey	·	1.5 km	MPC · JPL
687253	2011 SS_{141}	—	March 26, 2009	Kitt Peak	Spacewatch	·	1.8 km	MPC · JPL
687254	2011 SJ_{143}	—	October 10, 2004	Kitt Peak	Spacewatch	·	750 m	MPC · JPL
687255	2011 SD_{144}	—	September 26, 2011	Haleakala	Pan-STARRS 1	MAS	550 m	MPC · JPL
687256	2011 SG_{146}	—	September 26, 2011	Kitt Peak	Spacewatch	·	1.5 km	MPC · JPL
687257	2011 SE_{148}	—	August 28, 2006	Kitt Peak	Spacewatch	KOR	1.0 km	MPC · JPL
687258	2011 SS_{153}	—	September 26, 2006	Kitt Peak	Spacewatch	KOR	1.0 km	MPC · JPL
687259	2011 SF_{154}	—	September 26, 2011	Haleakala	Pan-STARRS 1	KOR	1.1 km	MPC · JPL
687260	2011 SJ_{155}	—	September 26, 2011	Haleakala	Pan-STARRS 1	·	490 m	MPC · JPL
687261	2011 ST_{155}	—	October 11, 2007	Kitt Peak	Spacewatch	·	1.3 km	MPC · JPL
687262	2011 SX_{155}	—	September 26, 2011	Haleakala	Pan-STARRS 1	·	830 m	MPC · JPL
687263	2011 SF_{157}	—	September 8, 2011	Kitt Peak	Spacewatch	·	1.5 km	MPC · JPL
687264	2011 SX_{157}	—	September 27, 2011	Les Engarouines	L. Bernasconi	·	1.7 km	MPC · JPL
687265	2011 SU_{161}	—	September 16, 2006	Kitt Peak	Spacewatch	·	1.9 km	MPC · JPL
687266	2011 SO_{163}	—	September 23, 2011	Kitt Peak	Spacewatch	·	860 m	MPC · JPL
687267	2011 ST_{163}	—	September 23, 2011	Kitt Peak	Spacewatch	(2076)	670 m	MPC · JPL
687268	2011 SU_{166}	—	September 26, 2011	Drebach	~Knöfel, A.	·	1.5 km	MPC · JPL
687269	2011 SZ_{181}	—	November 17, 1998	Kitt Peak	Spacewatch	·	1.5 km	MPC · JPL
687270	2011 SQ_{188}	—	November 20, 2008	Mount Lemmon	Mount Lemmon Survey	·	800 m	MPC · JPL
687271	2011 ST_{188}	—	December 22, 2003	Kitt Peak	Spacewatch	·	1.8 km	MPC · JPL
687272	2011 SL_{193}	—	December 21, 2008	Kitt Peak	Spacewatch	·	830 m	MPC · JPL
687273	2011 SQ_{198}	—	February 4, 2009	Mount Lemmon	Mount Lemmon Survey	·	1.7 km	MPC · JPL
687274	2011 SV_{198}	—	August 23, 2011	Charleston	R. Holmes	·	560 m	MPC · JPL
687275	2011 SJ_{200}	—	August 23, 2011	Haleakala	Pan-STARRS 1	·	1.5 km	MPC · JPL
687276	2011 SD_{205}	—	September 20, 2011	Kitt Peak	Spacewatch	·	2.7 km	MPC · JPL
687277	2011 SH_{207}	—	October 23, 2003	Kitt Peak	Spacewatch	MAR	880 m	MPC · JPL
687278	2011 SR_{211}	—	February 9, 2005	Mount Lemmon	Mount Lemmon Survey	(7744)	1.3 km	MPC · JPL
687279	2011 SW_{220}	—	October 16, 2007	Mount Lemmon	Mount Lemmon Survey	·	1.5 km	MPC · JPL
687280	2011 SW_{221}	—	September 26, 2011	Haleakala	Pan-STARRS 1	·	1.0 km	MPC · JPL
687281	2011 SL_{224}	—	September 28, 2011	Mount Lemmon	Mount Lemmon Survey	NEM	2.2 km	MPC · JPL
687282	2011 SM_{224}	—	September 28, 2011	Mount Lemmon	Mount Lemmon Survey	V	500 m	MPC · JPL
687283	2011 SU_{224}	—	August 10, 2011	Haleakala	Pan-STARRS 1	·	1.7 km	MPC · JPL
687284	2011 SZ_{229}	—	September 4, 2011	Haleakala	Pan-STARRS 1	·	1.4 km	MPC · JPL
687285	2011 SO_{233}	—	September 27, 2011	Mount Lemmon	Mount Lemmon Survey	·	2.1 km	MPC · JPL
687286	2011 SK_{234}	—	September 4, 2011	Haleakala	Pan-STARRS 1	·	1.6 km	MPC · JPL
687287	2011 SJ_{241}	—	September 26, 2011	Mount Lemmon	Mount Lemmon Survey	·	1.6 km	MPC · JPL
687288	2011 SR_{243}	—	March 1, 2009	Kitt Peak	Spacewatch	·	1.3 km	MPC · JPL
687289	2011 SW_{244}	—	September 27, 2011	ESA OGS	ESA OGS	·	590 m	MPC · JPL
687290	2011 SJ_{256}	—	September 20, 2011	Kitt Peak	Spacewatch	·	690 m	MPC · JPL
687291	2011 SL_{258}	—	September 23, 2011	Kitt Peak	Spacewatch	·	1.5 km	MPC · JPL
687292	2011 SO_{263}	—	August 19, 2001	Cerro Tololo	Deep Ecliptic Survey	·	1.8 km	MPC · JPL
687293	2011 SF_{269}	—	November 16, 2006	Mount Lemmon	Mount Lemmon Survey	·	1.8 km	MPC · JPL
687294	2011 SM_{270}	—	September 7, 2011	Kitt Peak	Spacewatch	AGN	1.0 km	MPC · JPL
687295	2011 SQ_{273}	—	November 16, 2011	Mount Lemmon	Mount Lemmon Survey	·	1.0 km	MPC · JPL
687296	2011 SC_{278}	—	September 14, 2006	Eskridge	Tibbets, D.	KOR	1.0 km	MPC · JPL
687297	2011 SJ_{279}	—	September 23, 2011	Mount Lemmon	Mount Lemmon Survey	KOR	1 km	MPC · JPL
687298	2011 SN_{279}	—	September 23, 2011	Haleakala	Pan-STARRS 1	·	1.5 km	MPC · JPL
687299	2011 SB_{282}	—	September 19, 2011	Haleakala	Pan-STARRS 1	·	2.5 km	MPC · JPL
687300	2011 SW_{283}	—	December 23, 2012	Haleakala	Pan-STARRS 1	·	2.4 km	MPC · JPL

== 687301–687400 ==
back to top

Designation			Discovery			Properties		Ref
Permanent	Provisional	Named after	Date	Site	Discoverer(s)	Category	Diam.	Ref
687301	2011 SF_{285}	—	May 5, 2010	Vail-Jarnac	Jarnac	·	2.0 km	MPC · JPL
687302	2011 SK_{285}	—	December 22, 2012	Haleakala	Pan-STARRS 1	·	1.7 km	MPC · JPL
687303	2011 SX_{285}	—	September 21, 2011	Haleakala	Pan-STARRS 1	DOR	1.8 km	MPC · JPL
687304	2011 SF_{287}	—	September 24, 2011	Haleakala	Pan-STARRS 1	·	1.7 km	MPC · JPL
687305	2011 ST_{288}	—	September 29, 2011	Kitt Peak	Spacewatch	·	1.4 km	MPC · JPL
687306	2011 SM_{290}	—	September 24, 2011	Haleakala	Pan-STARRS 1	·	1.5 km	MPC · JPL
687307	2011 SN_{290}	—	December 11, 2001	Socorro	LINEAR	·	1.6 km	MPC · JPL
687308	2011 SH_{295}	—	July 14, 2016	Haleakala	Pan-STARRS 1	·	2.4 km	MPC · JPL
687309	2011 SN_{295}	—	September 20, 2011	Haleakala	Pan-STARRS 1	·	680 m	MPC · JPL
687310	2011 SP_{295}	—	September 23, 2011	Haleakala	Pan-STARRS 1	·	1.6 km	MPC · JPL
687311	2011 SB_{296}	—	January 10, 2013	Haleakala	Pan-STARRS 1	THM	1.6 km	MPC · JPL
687312	2011 SD_{299}	—	March 13, 2013	Mount Lemmon	Mount Lemmon Survey	·	780 m	MPC · JPL
687313	2011 ST_{299}	—	October 31, 2008	Kitt Peak	Spacewatch	·	810 m	MPC · JPL
687314	2011 SX_{302}	—	December 23, 2017	Haleakala	Pan-STARRS 1	KOR	1.0 km	MPC · JPL
687315	2011 SK_{303}	—	September 26, 2011	Haleakala	Pan-STARRS 1	KOR	1.1 km	MPC · JPL
687316	2011 SW_{305}	—	December 21, 2012	Mount Lemmon	Mount Lemmon Survey	·	1.5 km	MPC · JPL
687317	2011 SC_{308}	—	September 23, 2011	Mount Lemmon	Mount Lemmon Survey	·	1.3 km	MPC · JPL
687318	2011 SQ_{308}	—	September 26, 2011	Haleakala	Pan-STARRS 1	·	910 m	MPC · JPL
687319	2011 ST_{308}	—	September 21, 2011	Haleakala	Pan-STARRS 1	KOR	1.1 km	MPC · JPL
687320	2011 SM_{309}	—	September 23, 2011	Haleakala	Pan-STARRS 1	·	460 m	MPC · JPL
687321	2011 SN_{309}	—	September 24, 2011	Mount Lemmon	Mount Lemmon Survey	·	1.4 km	MPC · JPL
687322	2011 SK_{310}	—	September 18, 2011	Mount Lemmon	Mount Lemmon Survey	·	1.3 km	MPC · JPL
687323	2011 SS_{310}	—	September 30, 2011	Mount Lemmon	Mount Lemmon Survey	·	1.7 km	MPC · JPL
687324	2011 SC_{313}	—	September 19, 2011	Haleakala	Pan-STARRS 1	·	1.4 km	MPC · JPL
687325	2011 SP_{313}	—	September 23, 2011	Haleakala	Pan-STARRS 1	·	1.6 km	MPC · JPL
687326	2011 SS_{313}	—	September 25, 2011	Haleakala	Pan-STARRS 1	·	1.5 km	MPC · JPL
687327	2011 SV_{313}	—	September 20, 2011	Haleakala	Pan-STARRS 1	AEO	900 m	MPC · JPL
687328	2011 SC_{314}	—	September 26, 2011	Haleakala	Pan-STARRS 1	KOR	1.0 km	MPC · JPL
687329	2011 SK_{314}	—	September 22, 2011	Kitt Peak	Spacewatch	·	1.5 km	MPC · JPL
687330	2011 SN_{314}	—	September 26, 2011	Haleakala	Pan-STARRS 1	·	580 m	MPC · JPL
687331	2011 SY_{314}	—	September 26, 2011	Haleakala	Pan-STARRS 1	KOR	1.0 km	MPC · JPL
687332	2011 SC_{315}	—	September 18, 2011	Mount Lemmon	Mount Lemmon Survey	·	610 m	MPC · JPL
687333	2011 SB_{317}	—	September 23, 2011	Kitt Peak	Spacewatch	·	1.5 km	MPC · JPL
687334	2011 SL_{318}	—	September 20, 2011	Haleakala	Pan-STARRS 1	·	1.5 km	MPC · JPL
687335	2011 SM_{319}	—	September 28, 2011	Kitt Peak	Spacewatch	·	1.6 km	MPC · JPL
687336	2011 SL_{327}	—	September 18, 2011	Mount Lemmon	Mount Lemmon Survey	·	1.4 km	MPC · JPL
687337	2011 SU_{327}	—	September 23, 2011	Haleakala	Pan-STARRS 1	KOR	1.1 km	MPC · JPL
687338	2011 SJ_{329}	—	September 26, 2011	Kitt Peak	Spacewatch	·	2.0 km	MPC · JPL
687339	2011 SV_{329}	—	September 24, 2011	Haleakala	Pan-STARRS 1	·	710 m	MPC · JPL
687340	2011 SA_{330}	—	September 23, 2011	Haleakala	Pan-STARRS 1	·	1.5 km	MPC · JPL
687341	2011 SH_{330}	—	September 26, 2011	Mount Lemmon	Mount Lemmon Survey	·	710 m	MPC · JPL
687342	2011 SQ_{331}	—	September 27, 2011	Mount Lemmon	Mount Lemmon Survey	·	660 m	MPC · JPL
687343	2011 SY_{331}	—	September 23, 2011	Mount Lemmon	Mount Lemmon Survey	·	1.7 km	MPC · JPL
687344	2011 SP_{332}	—	September 21, 2011	Mount Lemmon	Mount Lemmon Survey	KOR	1.2 km	MPC · JPL
687345	2011 SX_{333}	—	September 23, 2011	Haleakala	Pan-STARRS 1	·	1.3 km	MPC · JPL
687346	2011 SC_{334}	—	September 26, 2011	Mount Lemmon	Mount Lemmon Survey	KOR	1.1 km	MPC · JPL
687347	2011 SS_{335}	—	September 24, 2011	Haleakala	Pan-STARRS 1	·	2.1 km	MPC · JPL
687348	2011 ST_{336}	—	September 26, 2011	Haleakala	Pan-STARRS 1	·	1.5 km	MPC · JPL
687349	2011 SU_{336}	—	September 19, 2011	Haleakala	Pan-STARRS 1	EOS	1.4 km	MPC · JPL
687350	2011 SY_{336}	—	September 26, 2011	Mount Lemmon	Mount Lemmon Survey	·	1.5 km	MPC · JPL
687351	2011 SH_{337}	—	September 24, 2011	Haleakala	Pan-STARRS 1	·	1.8 km	MPC · JPL
687352	2011 ST_{337}	—	September 19, 2011	Haleakala	Pan-STARRS 1	·	1.9 km	MPC · JPL
687353	2011 SS_{338}	—	September 26, 2011	Mount Lemmon	Mount Lemmon Survey	·	1.7 km	MPC · JPL
687354	2011 SE_{339}	—	September 20, 2011	Haleakala	Pan-STARRS 1	·	1.5 km	MPC · JPL
687355	2011 SU_{341}	—	September 23, 2011	Haleakala	Pan-STARRS 1	KOR	980 m	MPC · JPL
687356	2011 SW_{341}	—	September 18, 2011	Mount Lemmon	Mount Lemmon Survey	KOR	980 m	MPC · JPL
687357	2011 SP_{342}	—	September 23, 2011	Kitt Peak	Spacewatch	·	1.6 km	MPC · JPL
687358	2011 SY_{342}	—	September 26, 2011	Mount Lemmon	Mount Lemmon Survey	·	1.6 km	MPC · JPL
687359	2011 ST_{344}	—	September 24, 2011	Haleakala	Pan-STARRS 1	·	1.6 km	MPC · JPL
687360	2011 SO_{348}	—	September 27, 2011	Mount Lemmon	Mount Lemmon Survey	·	1.6 km	MPC · JPL
687361	2011 SE_{353}	—	September 20, 2011	Mount Lemmon	Mount Lemmon Survey	EOS	1.6 km	MPC · JPL
687362	2011 SL_{353}	—	September 26, 2011	Mount Lemmon	Mount Lemmon Survey	AST	1.3 km	MPC · JPL
687363	2011 SX_{357}	—	September 27, 2011	Mount Lemmon	Mount Lemmon Survey	EOS	1.5 km	MPC · JPL
687364	2011 SM_{358}	—	September 23, 2011	Kitt Peak	Spacewatch	·	1.5 km	MPC · JPL
687365	2011 TC_{1}	—	November 10, 2004	Kitt Peak	Spacewatch	·	1.5 km	MPC · JPL
687366	2011 TQ_{6}	—	November 2, 2007	Kitt Peak	Spacewatch	AGN	950 m	MPC · JPL
687367	2011 TV_{7}	—	October 3, 2011	Bergisch Gladbach	W. Bickel	·	1.9 km	MPC · JPL
687368	2011 TP_{8}	—	October 5, 2011	Haleakala	Pan-STARRS 1	H	440 m	MPC · JPL
687369	2011 TV_{10}	—	September 7, 2011	Kitt Peak	Spacewatch	·	1.7 km	MPC · JPL
687370	2011 TX_{11}	—	August 16, 2006	Palomar	NEAT	MRX	970 m	MPC · JPL
687371	2011 TD_{18}	—	October 4, 2011	La Sagra	OAM	JUN	920 m	MPC · JPL
687372	2011 TC_{21}	—	October 1, 2011	Kitt Peak	Spacewatch	·	1.6 km	MPC · JPL
687373	2011 TH_{21}	—	October 1, 2011	Mount Lemmon	Mount Lemmon Survey	·	1.3 km	MPC · JPL
687374	2011 TE_{22}	—	October 1, 2011	Mount Lemmon	Mount Lemmon Survey	·	2.1 km	MPC · JPL
687375	2011 TB_{23}	—	October 1, 2011	Kitt Peak	Spacewatch	·	1.4 km	MPC · JPL
687376	2011 UC_{5}	—	October 18, 2011	Mount Lemmon	Mount Lemmon Survey	KOR	960 m	MPC · JPL
687377	2011 US_{11}	—	September 21, 2011	Haleakala	Pan-STARRS 1	TIN	750 m	MPC · JPL
687378	2011 UN_{12}	—	October 16, 2011	Kitt Peak	Spacewatch	·	1.3 km	MPC · JPL
687379	2011 UX_{15}	—	December 19, 2007	Bergisch Gladbach	W. Bickel	HOF	2.1 km	MPC · JPL
687380	2011 UH_{19}	—	October 19, 2011	Mount Lemmon	Mount Lemmon Survey	·	850 m	MPC · JPL
687381	2011 UJ_{19}	—	January 15, 2009	Kitt Peak	Spacewatch	·	720 m	MPC · JPL
687382	2011 UN_{22}	—	September 23, 2011	Kitt Peak	Spacewatch	·	700 m	MPC · JPL
687383	2011 UK_{23}	—	November 30, 2005	Kitt Peak	Spacewatch	·	560 m	MPC · JPL
687384	2011 UC_{25}	—	September 21, 2011	Mount Lemmon	Mount Lemmon Survey	EOS	1.4 km	MPC · JPL
687385	2011 UD_{25}	—	September 27, 2006	Mount Lemmon	Mount Lemmon Survey	KOR	1.1 km	MPC · JPL
687386	2011 UR_{33}	—	October 1, 2011	Kitt Peak	Spacewatch	·	1.8 km	MPC · JPL
687387	2011 UG_{35}	—	October 19, 2011	Mount Lemmon	Mount Lemmon Survey	·	2.9 km	MPC · JPL
687388	2011 UF_{36}	—	September 23, 2011	Mount Lemmon	Mount Lemmon Survey	HNS	1.2 km	MPC · JPL
687389	2011 UH_{36}	—	October 19, 2011	Mount Lemmon	Mount Lemmon Survey	·	1.8 km	MPC · JPL
687390	2011 UL_{36}	—	October 19, 2011	Mount Lemmon	Mount Lemmon Survey	MAS	510 m	MPC · JPL
687391	2011 UV_{38}	—	October 20, 2011	Mount Lemmon	Mount Lemmon Survey	·	1.3 km	MPC · JPL
687392	2011 UW_{41}	—	September 22, 2011	Kitt Peak	Spacewatch	V	470 m	MPC · JPL
687393	2011 UC_{48}	—	October 18, 2011	Kitt Peak	Spacewatch	·	2.5 km	MPC · JPL
687394	2011 UM_{56}	—	October 18, 2011	Mount Lemmon	Mount Lemmon Survey	·	2.3 km	MPC · JPL
687395	2011 UP_{58}	—	October 19, 2011	Mount Lemmon	Mount Lemmon Survey	EOS	1.2 km	MPC · JPL
687396	2011 UF_{61}	—	October 18, 2011	Mount Lemmon	Mount Lemmon Survey	·	780 m	MPC · JPL
687397	2011 UG_{74}	—	October 19, 2011	Kitt Peak	Spacewatch	·	570 m	MPC · JPL
687398	2011 UQ_{77}	—	October 19, 2011	Kitt Peak	Spacewatch	·	1.9 km	MPC · JPL
687399	2011 UX_{80}	—	October 19, 2011	Kitt Peak	Spacewatch	·	1.1 km	MPC · JPL
687400	2011 UJ_{84}	—	April 10, 2003	Kitt Peak	Spacewatch	EOS	1.8 km	MPC · JPL

== 687401–687500 ==
back to top

Designation			Discovery			Properties		Ref
Permanent	Provisional	Named after	Date	Site	Discoverer(s)	Category	Diam.	Ref
687401	2011 UG_{87}	—	September 20, 2011	Mount Lemmon	Mount Lemmon Survey	·	2.6 km	MPC · JPL
687402	2011 UC_{94}	—	October 18, 2011	Mount Lemmon	Mount Lemmon Survey	·	910 m	MPC · JPL
687403	2011 UA_{99}	—	March 4, 2005	Mount Lemmon	Mount Lemmon Survey	·	960 m	MPC · JPL
687404	2011 UH_{100}	—	October 20, 2011	Mount Lemmon	Mount Lemmon Survey	KOR	1.2 km	MPC · JPL
687405	2011 UC_{104}	—	September 23, 2011	Kitt Peak	Spacewatch	·	660 m	MPC · JPL
687406	2011 UA_{106}	—	September 18, 2003	Kitt Peak	Spacewatch	T_{j} (2.98)	3.3 km	MPC · JPL
687407	2011 UQ_{122}	—	October 19, 2011	Mount Lemmon	Mount Lemmon Survey	·	1.2 km	MPC · JPL
687408	2011 UC_{124}	—	September 23, 2011	Haleakala	Pan-STARRS 1	·	900 m	MPC · JPL
687409	2011 UZ_{125}	—	October 20, 2011	Kitt Peak	Spacewatch	·	1.5 km	MPC · JPL
687410	2011 UC_{130}	—	September 19, 2006	Kitt Peak	Spacewatch	KOR	1.2 km	MPC · JPL
687411	2011 UD_{134}	—	September 24, 2011	Haleakala	Pan-STARRS 1	EOS	1.3 km	MPC · JPL
687412	2011 UR_{138}	—	August 16, 2002	Palomar	NEAT	·	1.2 km	MPC · JPL
687413	2011 UX_{139}	—	October 23, 2011	Kitt Peak	Spacewatch	·	1.6 km	MPC · JPL
687414	2011 UT_{144}	—	March 26, 2004	Kitt Peak	Spacewatch	·	1.8 km	MPC · JPL
687415	2011 UL_{148}	—	October 22, 2011	Kitt Peak	Spacewatch	KOR	1.1 km	MPC · JPL
687416	2011 UM_{150}	—	October 3, 2011	Mount Lemmon	Mount Lemmon Survey	EOS	1.3 km	MPC · JPL
687417	2011 UP_{151}	—	October 25, 2011	Haleakala	Pan-STARRS 1	·	1.7 km	MPC · JPL
687418	2011 UZ_{151}	—	October 24, 2011	Haleakala	Pan-STARRS 1	H	510 m	MPC · JPL
687419	2011 UF_{154}	—	September 27, 2011	Mount Lemmon	Mount Lemmon Survey	H	410 m	MPC · JPL
687420	2011 UZ_{157}	—	September 20, 1995	Kitt Peak	Spacewatch	·	1.4 km	MPC · JPL
687421	2011 UF_{161}	—	October 5, 2011	Les Engarouines	L. Bernasconi	·	1 km	MPC · JPL
687422	2011 UJ_{167}	—	December 4, 2007	Kitt Peak	Spacewatch	·	1.7 km	MPC · JPL
687423	2011 UM_{175}	—	October 24, 2011	Kitt Peak	Spacewatch	·	940 m	MPC · JPL
687424	2011 UU_{175}	—	October 20, 2011	Kitt Peak	Spacewatch	·	680 m	MPC · JPL
687425	2011 US_{182}	—	October 25, 2011	Haleakala	Pan-STARRS 1	·	1.7 km	MPC · JPL
687426	2011 UX_{185}	—	October 25, 2011	Haleakala	Pan-STARRS 1	·	1.5 km	MPC · JPL
687427	2011 UU_{188}	—	October 26, 2011	Haleakala	Pan-STARRS 1	·	1.6 km	MPC · JPL
687428	2011 UB_{195}	—	April 17, 2005	Kitt Peak	Spacewatch	·	1.7 km	MPC · JPL
687429	2011 UM_{203}	—	October 26, 2011	Haleakala	Pan-STARRS 1	·	1.4 km	MPC · JPL
687430	2011 UM_{207}	—	September 26, 2006	Mount Lemmon	Mount Lemmon Survey	WIT	850 m	MPC · JPL
687431	2011 UG_{208}	—	August 29, 2006	Kitt Peak	Spacewatch	HOF	2.4 km	MPC · JPL
687432	2011 UM_{209}	—	October 24, 2011	Mount Lemmon	Mount Lemmon Survey	·	1.6 km	MPC · JPL
687433	2011 UP_{209}	—	October 24, 2011	Mount Lemmon	Mount Lemmon Survey	EOS	1.1 km	MPC · JPL
687434	2011 UU_{209}	—	February 5, 2009	Kitt Peak	Spacewatch	·	810 m	MPC · JPL
687435	2011 UQ_{210}	—	October 24, 2011	Mount Lemmon	Mount Lemmon Survey	·	1.6 km	MPC · JPL
687436	2011 UW_{210}	—	October 2, 2011	Bergisch Gladbach	W. Bickel	EOS	1.4 km	MPC · JPL
687437	2011 UM_{211}	—	September 30, 2011	Kitt Peak	Spacewatch	·	1.5 km	MPC · JPL
687438	2011 UT_{213}	—	October 4, 2011	Bergisch Gladbach	W. Bickel	·	1.4 km	MPC · JPL
687439	2011 UH_{216}	—	October 24, 2011	Mount Lemmon	Mount Lemmon Survey	·	1.6 km	MPC · JPL
687440	2011 UU_{221}	—	October 28, 2006	Mount Lemmon	Mount Lemmon Survey	·	1.2 km	MPC · JPL
687441	2011 UR_{224}	—	September 25, 2000	Kitt Peak	Spacewatch	·	830 m	MPC · JPL
687442	2011 UQ_{225}	—	October 20, 2011	Mount Lemmon	Mount Lemmon Survey	·	1.8 km	MPC · JPL
687443	2011 UJ_{229}	—	September 26, 2006	Kitt Peak	Spacewatch	KOR	920 m	MPC · JPL
687444	2011 UZ_{230}	—	October 19, 2011	Mount Lemmon	Mount Lemmon Survey	·	670 m	MPC · JPL
687445	2011 UF_{233}	—	September 18, 2006	Kitt Peak	Spacewatch	KOR	950 m	MPC · JPL
687446	2011 UJ_{233}	—	October 18, 2011	Mount Lemmon	Mount Lemmon Survey	·	1.4 km	MPC · JPL
687447	2011 UE_{234}	—	October 23, 2011	Kitt Peak	Spacewatch	·	1.5 km	MPC · JPL
687448	2011 UF_{244}	—	October 25, 2011	Haleakala	Pan-STARRS 1	·	950 m	MPC · JPL
687449	2011 UF_{247}	—	October 26, 2011	Haleakala	Pan-STARRS 1	EOS	1.2 km	MPC · JPL
687450	2011 UH_{248}	—	October 26, 2011	Haleakala	Pan-STARRS 1	·	1.6 km	MPC · JPL
687451	2011 UB_{250}	—	September 24, 2011	Mount Lemmon	Mount Lemmon Survey	NYS	730 m	MPC · JPL
687452	2011 UW_{257}	—	October 23, 2011	Kitt Peak	Spacewatch	HOF	2.2 km	MPC · JPL
687453	2011 UK_{260}	—	September 15, 2007	Kitt Peak	Spacewatch	·	870 m	MPC · JPL
687454	2011 UC_{264}	—	February 21, 2009	Kitt Peak	Spacewatch	·	890 m	MPC · JPL
687455	2011 UE_{267}	—	September 22, 2011	Kitt Peak	Spacewatch	·	590 m	MPC · JPL
687456	2011 UO_{269}	—	November 30, 2007	Lulin	LUSS	(5)	1.1 km	MPC · JPL
687457	2011 UA_{272}	—	November 19, 2007	Kitt Peak	Spacewatch	·	1.8 km	MPC · JPL
687458	2011 UP_{274}	—	October 30, 2011	Mount Lemmon	Mount Lemmon Survey	KOR	1.0 km	MPC · JPL
687459	2011 UE_{282}	—	October 20, 2011	Mount Lemmon	Mount Lemmon Survey	·	2.1 km	MPC · JPL
687460	2011 UJ_{282}	—	October 28, 2011	Catalina	CSS	·	990 m	MPC · JPL
687461	2011 UN_{290}	—	October 29, 2011	Haleakala	Pan-STARRS 1	·	810 m	MPC · JPL
687462	2011 UJ_{297}	—	October 21, 2011	Kitt Peak	Spacewatch	·	1.7 km	MPC · JPL
687463	2011 UL_{299}	—	January 16, 2005	Kitt Peak	Spacewatch	MAS	520 m	MPC · JPL
687464	2011 UE_{304}	—	October 21, 2011	Piszkéstető	K. Sárneczky	·	1.7 km	MPC · JPL
687465	2011 UT_{306}	—	October 18, 2011	Catalina	CSS	·	2.0 km	MPC · JPL
687466	2011 UY_{308}	—	September 20, 2011	Mount Lemmon	Mount Lemmon Survey	·	1.9 km	MPC · JPL
687467	2011 US_{309}	—	October 26, 2011	Mayhill-ISON	L. Elenin	·	1.6 km	MPC · JPL
687468	2011 UB_{311}	—	October 30, 2011	Kitt Peak	Spacewatch	·	770 m	MPC · JPL
687469	2011 UX_{312}	—	December 14, 2004	Kitt Peak	Spacewatch	MAS	590 m	MPC · JPL
687470	2011 UF_{315}	—	October 18, 2011	Kitt Peak	Spacewatch	·	570 m	MPC · JPL
687471	2011 UT_{315}	—	October 20, 2011	Mount Lemmon	Mount Lemmon Survey	·	1.1 km	MPC · JPL
687472	2011 UO_{318}	—	October 30, 2011	Mount Lemmon	Mount Lemmon Survey	NYS	820 m	MPC · JPL
687473	2011 UM_{323}	—	August 27, 2006	Kitt Peak	Spacewatch	·	1.6 km	MPC · JPL
687474	2011 UC_{327}	—	March 29, 2009	Kitt Peak	Spacewatch	KOR	1.3 km	MPC · JPL
687475	2011 UB_{330}	—	October 23, 2011	Mount Lemmon	Mount Lemmon Survey	·	870 m	MPC · JPL
687476	2011 UD_{333}	—	October 28, 2011	Mount Lemmon	Mount Lemmon Survey	·	1.8 km	MPC · JPL
687477	2011 UC_{336}	—	September 21, 2011	Kitt Peak	Spacewatch	·	1.4 km	MPC · JPL
687478	2011 UM_{336}	—	September 23, 2011	Haleakala	Pan-STARRS 1	·	770 m	MPC · JPL
687479	2011 US_{336}	—	June 8, 2011	Haleakala	Pan-STARRS 1	·	1.1 km	MPC · JPL
687480	2011 UZ_{336}	—	October 3, 2004	Palomar	NEAT	·	690 m	MPC · JPL
687481	2011 UF_{340}	—	August 19, 2001	Cerro Tololo	Deep Ecliptic Survey	·	1.6 km	MPC · JPL
687482	2011 UP_{342}	—	October 4, 2004	Kitt Peak	Spacewatch	·	660 m	MPC · JPL
687483	2011 UZ_{350}	—	October 19, 2011	Mount Lemmon	Mount Lemmon Survey	·	1.6 km	MPC · JPL
687484	2011 UC_{351}	—	October 19, 2011	Mount Lemmon	Mount Lemmon Survey	EOS	1.2 km	MPC · JPL
687485	2011 UJ_{355}	—	September 20, 2011	Kitt Peak	Spacewatch	·	790 m	MPC · JPL
687486	2011 UW_{356}	—	October 20, 2011	Mount Lemmon	Mount Lemmon Survey	·	1.3 km	MPC · JPL
687487	2011 UV_{357}	—	December 22, 2008	Kitt Peak	Spacewatch	·	810 m	MPC · JPL
687488	2011 UZ_{357}	—	September 25, 2011	Haleakala	Pan-STARRS 1	·	1.2 km	MPC · JPL
687489	2011 UC_{359}	—	October 20, 2011	Mount Lemmon	Mount Lemmon Survey	NYS	840 m	MPC · JPL
687490	2011 UU_{360}	—	December 22, 2003	Kitt Peak	Spacewatch	·	1.2 km	MPC · JPL
687491	2011 UP_{363}	—	August 19, 2006	Kitt Peak	Spacewatch	·	1.3 km	MPC · JPL
687492	2011 UX_{363}	—	October 22, 2011	Mount Lemmon	Mount Lemmon Survey	·	1.6 km	MPC · JPL
687493	2011 UW_{364}	—	October 21, 2006	Mount Lemmon	Mount Lemmon Survey	·	1.5 km	MPC · JPL
687494	2011 UZ_{364}	—	October 22, 2011	Mount Lemmon	Mount Lemmon Survey	·	1.3 km	MPC · JPL
687495	2011 UV_{366}	—	September 27, 2006	Kitt Peak	Spacewatch	KOR	1.0 km	MPC · JPL
687496	2011 UA_{371}	—	October 23, 2011	Mount Lemmon	Mount Lemmon Survey	·	1.5 km	MPC · JPL
687497	2011 UE_{371}	—	November 15, 2006	Mount Lemmon	Mount Lemmon Survey	·	1.2 km	MPC · JPL
687498	2011 UH_{372}	—	October 23, 2011	Mount Lemmon	Mount Lemmon Survey	·	1.5 km	MPC · JPL
687499	2011 UZ_{372}	—	October 23, 2011	Mount Lemmon	Mount Lemmon Survey	HOF	2.2 km	MPC · JPL
687500	2011 UJ_{384}	—	October 24, 2011	Haleakala	Pan-STARRS 1	·	1.6 km	MPC · JPL

== 687501–687600 ==
back to top

Designation			Discovery			Properties		Ref
Permanent	Provisional	Named after	Date	Site	Discoverer(s)	Category	Diam.	Ref
687501	2011 UB_{390}	—	October 26, 2011	Mayhill-ISON	L. Elenin	H	710 m	MPC · JPL
687502	2011 UZ_{393}	—	September 14, 2006	Kitt Peak	Spacewatch	·	1.4 km	MPC · JPL
687503	2011 UE_{394}	—	October 28, 2011	Mount Lemmon	Mount Lemmon Survey	·	1.4 km	MPC · JPL
687504	2011 US_{394}	—	September 30, 2011	Kitt Peak	Spacewatch	WIT	1.0 km	MPC · JPL
687505	2011 UC_{400}	—	October 23, 2011	Mount Lemmon	Mount Lemmon Survey	·	1.6 km	MPC · JPL
687506	2011 US_{408}	—	September 26, 2011	Mount Lemmon	Mount Lemmon Survey	KOR	1.1 km	MPC · JPL
687507	2011 UG_{417}	—	October 25, 2011	Haleakala	Pan-STARRS 1	·	1.0 km	MPC · JPL
687508	2011 US_{417}	—	October 26, 2011	Haleakala	Pan-STARRS 1	·	1.6 km	MPC · JPL
687509	2011 UN_{418}	—	October 26, 2011	Haleakala	Pan-STARRS 1	NEM	2.1 km	MPC · JPL
687510	2011 UK_{419}	—	October 20, 2011	Mount Lemmon	Mount Lemmon Survey	EOS	1.6 km	MPC · JPL
687511	2011 US_{420}	—	October 26, 2011	Haleakala	Pan-STARRS 1	·	1.9 km	MPC · JPL
687512	2011 UT_{420}	—	October 23, 2011	Haleakala	Pan-STARRS 1	V	470 m	MPC · JPL
687513	2011 UK_{424}	—	October 31, 2011	Mount Lemmon	Mount Lemmon Survey	EUN	670 m	MPC · JPL
687514	2011 UY_{424}	—	January 10, 2013	Haleakala	Pan-STARRS 1	·	2.1 km	MPC · JPL
687515	2011 UA_{426}	—	October 24, 2011	Haleakala	Pan-STARRS 1	·	1.2 km	MPC · JPL
687516	2011 UY_{427}	—	October 25, 2016	Haleakala	Pan-STARRS 1	·	1.6 km	MPC · JPL
687517	2011 UF_{429}	—	August 30, 2014	Oukaïmeden	M. Ory	(2076)	650 m	MPC · JPL
687518	2011 UX_{435}	—	November 18, 2017	Haleakala	Pan-STARRS 1	·	2.2 km	MPC · JPL
687519	2011 UH_{436}	—	October 6, 2016	Haleakala	Pan-STARRS 1	·	2.0 km	MPC · JPL
687520	2011 UD_{437}	—	October 19, 2011	Kitt Peak	Spacewatch	·	610 m	MPC · JPL
687521	2011 UK_{437}	—	May 27, 2014	Haleakala	Pan-STARRS 1	·	650 m	MPC · JPL
687522	2011 UM_{437}	—	October 20, 2011	Kitt Peak	Spacewatch	·	850 m	MPC · JPL
687523	2011 UE_{438}	—	October 19, 2011	Kitt Peak	Spacewatch	·	1.8 km	MPC · JPL
687524	2011 UU_{438}	—	October 16, 2011	Haleakala	Pan-STARRS 1	·	650 m	MPC · JPL
687525	2011 UK_{441}	—	April 17, 2013	Siding Spring	SSS	·	2.4 km	MPC · JPL
687526	2011 UZ_{441}	—	November 7, 2016	Mount Lemmon	Mount Lemmon Survey	·	1.4 km	MPC · JPL
687527	2011 UK_{442}	—	October 26, 2011	Haleakala	Pan-STARRS 1	·	1.3 km	MPC · JPL
687528	2011 UL_{442}	—	October 26, 2011	Haleakala	Pan-STARRS 1	NAE	1.6 km	MPC · JPL
687529	2011 UJ_{444}	—	October 26, 2011	Haleakala	Pan-STARRS 1	·	1.5 km	MPC · JPL
687530	2011 UY_{446}	—	October 23, 2011	Mount Lemmon	Mount Lemmon Survey	·	1.5 km	MPC · JPL
687531	2011 UK_{447}	—	September 19, 1998	Apache Point	SDSS Collaboration	·	910 m	MPC · JPL
687532	2011 UH_{448}	—	October 24, 2011	Haleakala	Pan-STARRS 1	·	1.3 km	MPC · JPL
687533	2011 UT_{448}	—	October 18, 2011	Kitt Peak	Spacewatch	·	910 m	MPC · JPL
687534	2011 UG_{449}	—	October 17, 2011	Kitt Peak	Spacewatch	·	1.5 km	MPC · JPL
687535	2011 UO_{450}	—	October 24, 2011	Haleakala	Pan-STARRS 1	V	440 m	MPC · JPL
687536	2011 US_{450}	—	October 24, 2011	Haleakala	Pan-STARRS 1	·	790 m	MPC · JPL
687537	2011 US_{452}	—	October 26, 2011	Haleakala	Pan-STARRS 1	EOS	1.5 km	MPC · JPL
687538	2011 UV_{453}	—	October 23, 2011	Mount Lemmon	Mount Lemmon Survey	·	1.8 km	MPC · JPL
687539	2011 UY_{453}	—	October 19, 2011	Mount Lemmon	Mount Lemmon Survey	·	1.5 km	MPC · JPL
687540	2011 UH_{455}	—	October 21, 2011	Mount Lemmon	Mount Lemmon Survey	KOR	1.3 km	MPC · JPL
687541	2011 UV_{455}	—	October 26, 2011	Haleakala	Pan-STARRS 1	EOS	1.6 km	MPC · JPL
687542	2011 UB_{457}	—	October 25, 2011	Haleakala	Pan-STARRS 1	EOS	1.3 km	MPC · JPL
687543	2011 UD_{460}	—	October 22, 2011	Mount Lemmon	Mount Lemmon Survey	KOR	1 km	MPC · JPL
687544	2011 UQ_{460}	—	October 25, 2011	Haleakala	Pan-STARRS 1	·	1.9 km	MPC · JPL
687545	2011 UU_{463}	—	October 26, 2011	Haleakala	Pan-STARRS 1	·	870 m	MPC · JPL
687546	2011 UD_{464}	—	October 20, 2011	Mount Lemmon	Mount Lemmon Survey	·	1.2 km	MPC · JPL
687547	2011 UE_{464}	—	October 20, 2011	Mount Lemmon	Mount Lemmon Survey	·	1.6 km	MPC · JPL
687548	2011 UR_{469}	—	October 20, 2011	Mount Lemmon	Mount Lemmon Survey	KOR	950 m	MPC · JPL
687549	2011 UU_{471}	—	October 26, 2011	Haleakala	Pan-STARRS 1	EOS	1.4 km	MPC · JPL
687550	2011 UZ_{472}	—	October 26, 2011	Haleakala	Pan-STARRS 1	V	440 m	MPC · JPL
687551	2011 UU_{473}	—	October 21, 2011	Mount Lemmon	Mount Lemmon Survey	·	1.9 km	MPC · JPL
687552	2011 UQ_{474}	—	October 26, 2011	Haleakala	Pan-STARRS 1	·	1.3 km	MPC · JPL
687553	2011 UG_{475}	—	October 23, 2011	Haleakala	Pan-STARRS 1	·	1.6 km	MPC · JPL
687554	2011 UQ_{475}	—	October 22, 2011	Mount Lemmon	Mount Lemmon Survey	·	1.4 km	MPC · JPL
687555	2011 UO_{476}	—	October 23, 2011	Haleakala	Pan-STARRS 1	·	1.9 km	MPC · JPL
687556	2011 UQ_{476}	—	October 24, 2011	Mount Lemmon	Mount Lemmon Survey	·	630 m	MPC · JPL
687557	2011 US_{476}	—	October 30, 2011	Mount Lemmon	Mount Lemmon Survey	EOS	1.3 km	MPC · JPL
687558	2011 UY_{476}	—	October 25, 2011	Haleakala	Pan-STARRS 1	V	530 m	MPC · JPL
687559	2011 UA_{477}	—	October 24, 2011	Haleakala	Pan-STARRS 1	·	2.3 km	MPC · JPL
687560	2011 UC_{477}	—	October 19, 2011	Mount Lemmon	Mount Lemmon Survey	·	1.6 km	MPC · JPL
687561	2011 UK_{479}	—	October 25, 2011	Haleakala	Pan-STARRS 1	·	1.7 km	MPC · JPL
687562	2011 UH_{480}	—	October 26, 2011	Haleakala	Pan-STARRS 1	·	1.6 km	MPC · JPL
687563	2011 UA_{482}	—	October 26, 2011	Haleakala	Pan-STARRS 1	·	1.6 km	MPC · JPL
687564	2011 UD_{482}	—	October 24, 2011	Haleakala	Pan-STARRS 1	·	1.5 km	MPC · JPL
687565	2011 UU_{482}	—	October 23, 2011	Haleakala	Pan-STARRS 1	EOS	1.3 km	MPC · JPL
687566	2011 UY_{482}	—	October 19, 2011	Haleakala	Pan-STARRS 1	·	1.8 km	MPC · JPL
687567	2011 UL_{486}	—	October 26, 2011	Haleakala	Pan-STARRS 1	EOS	1.3 km	MPC · JPL
687568	2011 UW_{487}	—	October 25, 2011	Haleakala	Pan-STARRS 1	·	1.7 km	MPC · JPL
687569	2011 UH_{488}	—	October 26, 2011	Haleakala	Pan-STARRS 1	·	2.3 km	MPC · JPL
687570	2011 UU_{489}	—	October 22, 2011	Charleston	R. Holmes	EOS	1.3 km	MPC · JPL
687571	2011 UQ_{490}	—	October 24, 2011	Haleakala	Pan-STARRS 1	·	870 m	MPC · JPL
687572	2011 UT_{490}	—	October 24, 2011	Haleakala	Pan-STARRS 1	THM	1.3 km	MPC · JPL
687573	2011 UP_{499}	—	October 24, 2011	Mount Lemmon	Mount Lemmon Survey	·	1.7 km	MPC · JPL
687574	2011 UU_{504}	—	October 18, 2011	Mount Lemmon	Mount Lemmon Survey	·	1.3 km	MPC · JPL
687575	2011 UV_{504}	—	October 26, 2011	Haleakala	Pan-STARRS 1	·	1.9 km	MPC · JPL
687576	2011 UX_{504}	—	October 23, 2011	Haleakala	Pan-STARRS 1	·	1.5 km	MPC · JPL
687577	2011 UY_{504}	—	October 23, 2011	Haleakala	Pan-STARRS 1	·	2.0 km	MPC · JPL
687578	2011 VQ	—	October 23, 2011	Mount Lemmon	Mount Lemmon Survey	EOS	1.3 km	MPC · JPL
687579	2011 VS	—	November 1, 2011	Mount Lemmon	Mount Lemmon Survey	·	2.3 km	MPC · JPL
687580	2011 VM_{2}	—	August 30, 2002	Palomar	NEAT	·	1.2 km	MPC · JPL
687581	2011 VE_{4}	—	November 2, 2011	Mount Lemmon	Mount Lemmon Survey	·	1.9 km	MPC · JPL
687582	2011 VP_{4}	—	November 2, 2011	Mount Lemmon	Mount Lemmon Survey	·	1.8 km	MPC · JPL
687583	2011 VD_{6}	—	April 1, 2009	Kitt Peak	Spacewatch	·	1.6 km	MPC · JPL
687584	2011 VU_{7}	—	October 25, 2011	Haleakala	Pan-STARRS 1	·	880 m	MPC · JPL
687585	2011 VG_{10}	—	November 15, 2011	Mount Lemmon	Mount Lemmon Survey	·	1.5 km	MPC · JPL
687586	2011 VZ_{12}	—	October 21, 2006	Kitt Peak	Spacewatch	·	1.8 km	MPC · JPL
687587	2011 VN_{17}	—	October 20, 2011	Mount Lemmon	Mount Lemmon Survey	V	440 m	MPC · JPL
687588	2011 VH_{20}	—	June 1, 2005	Mount Lemmon	Mount Lemmon Survey	·	1.9 km	MPC · JPL
687589	2011 VK_{20}	—	November 15, 2011	Kitt Peak	Spacewatch	·	2.5 km	MPC · JPL
687590	2011 VX_{22}	—	August 21, 2004	Siding Spring	SSS	(2076)	730 m	MPC · JPL
687591	2011 VL_{24}	—	February 9, 2005	Mount Lemmon	Mount Lemmon Survey	·	1.0 km	MPC · JPL
687592	2011 VV_{24}	—	November 2, 2011	Kitt Peak	Spacewatch	·	920 m	MPC · JPL
687593	2011 VX_{25}	—	November 2, 2011	Mount Lemmon	Mount Lemmon Survey	·	1.9 km	MPC · JPL
687594	2011 VP_{28}	—	November 3, 2011	Mount Lemmon	Mount Lemmon Survey	·	2.2 km	MPC · JPL
687595	2011 VE_{29}	—	April 29, 2014	Haleakala	Pan-STARRS 1	EOS	1.3 km	MPC · JPL
687596	2011 VR_{30}	—	November 1, 2011	Kitt Peak	Spacewatch	KOR	1.0 km	MPC · JPL
687597	2011 VB_{31}	—	November 3, 2011	Mount Lemmon	Mount Lemmon Survey	EOS	1.4 km	MPC · JPL
687598	2011 VB_{33}	—	November 15, 2011	Mount Lemmon	Mount Lemmon Survey	NYS	900 m	MPC · JPL
687599	2011 VC_{33}	—	November 15, 2011	Mount Lemmon	Mount Lemmon Survey	·	980 m	MPC · JPL
687600	2011 VH_{33}	—	November 3, 2011	Mount Lemmon	Mount Lemmon Survey	·	1.8 km	MPC · JPL

== 687601–687700 ==
back to top

Designation			Discovery			Properties		Ref
Permanent	Provisional	Named after	Date	Site	Discoverer(s)	Category	Diam.	Ref
687601	2011 VY_{34}	—	November 15, 2011	Mount Lemmon	Mount Lemmon Survey	·	1.6 km	MPC · JPL
687602	2011 VH_{35}	—	November 16, 2006	Kitt Peak	Spacewatch	·	1.1 km	MPC · JPL
687603	2011 VF_{37}	—	November 2, 2011	Kitt Peak	Spacewatch	·	2.1 km	MPC · JPL
687604	2011 WH_{4}	—	November 16, 1998	Kitt Peak	Spacewatch	·	1.2 km	MPC · JPL
687605	2011 WB_{7}	—	October 24, 2011	Haleakala	Pan-STARRS 1	·	1.6 km	MPC · JPL
687606	2011 WF_{8}	—	October 24, 2011	Haleakala	Pan-STARRS 1	NYS	810 m	MPC · JPL
687607	2011 WZ_{8}	—	March 31, 2003	Kitt Peak	Spacewatch	·	600 m	MPC · JPL
687608	2011 WS_{9}	—	November 3, 2011	Kitt Peak	Spacewatch	·	860 m	MPC · JPL
687609	2011 WG_{11}	—	October 26, 2011	Haleakala	Pan-STARRS 1	EOS	1.2 km	MPC · JPL
687610	2011 WN_{19}	—	November 17, 2011	Mount Lemmon	Mount Lemmon Survey	KOR	1.0 km	MPC · JPL
687611	2011 WY_{27}	—	October 24, 2011	Haleakala	Pan-STARRS 1	·	2.1 km	MPC · JPL
687612	2011 WR_{30}	—	September 30, 2002	Haleakala	NEAT	·	2.0 km	MPC · JPL
687613	2011 WP_{34}	—	October 30, 2011	Kitt Peak	Spacewatch	·	1.1 km	MPC · JPL
687614	2011 WL_{35}	—	October 3, 2011	Mount Lemmon	Mount Lemmon Survey	NYS	990 m	MPC · JPL
687615	2011 WC_{38}	—	October 9, 1999	Kitt Peak	Spacewatch	·	2.7 km	MPC · JPL
687616	2011 WN_{38}	—	October 26, 2011	Haleakala	Pan-STARRS 1	·	2.6 km	MPC · JPL
687617	2011 WM_{44}	—	September 22, 2011	Mount Lemmon	Mount Lemmon Survey	·	930 m	MPC · JPL
687618	2011 WK_{52}	—	October 21, 2011	Mount Lemmon	Mount Lemmon Survey	·	1.9 km	MPC · JPL
687619	2011 WP_{53}	—	September 27, 2006	Mount Lemmon	Mount Lemmon Survey	·	1.7 km	MPC · JPL
687620	2011 WT_{56}	—	November 2, 2011	Kitt Peak	Spacewatch	·	1.6 km	MPC · JPL
687621	2011 WU_{61}	—	October 27, 2006	Mount Lemmon	Mount Lemmon Survey	(13314)	2.1 km	MPC · JPL
687622	2011 WL_{66}	—	November 17, 2011	Mount Lemmon	Mount Lemmon Survey	H	430 m	MPC · JPL
687623	2011 WP_{70}	—	November 23, 2011	Mount Lemmon	Mount Lemmon Survey	·	1.4 km	MPC · JPL
687624	2011 WU_{75}	—	October 24, 2011	Haleakala	Pan-STARRS 1	·	1.7 km	MPC · JPL
687625	2011 WG_{79}	—	August 27, 2006	Kitt Peak	Spacewatch	·	1.4 km	MPC · JPL
687626	2011 WB_{81}	—	November 17, 2011	Kitt Peak	Spacewatch	·	1.0 km	MPC · JPL
687627	2011 WY_{94}	—	September 2, 2010	Mount Lemmon	Mount Lemmon Survey	·	1.7 km	MPC · JPL
687628	2011 WE_{95}	—	November 3, 2011	Mount Lemmon	Mount Lemmon Survey	H	460 m	MPC · JPL
687629	2011 WL_{96}	—	November 17, 2011	Mount Lemmon	Mount Lemmon Survey	·	980 m	MPC · JPL
687630	2011 WN_{98}	—	November 23, 2011	Mount Lemmon	Mount Lemmon Survey	·	1.9 km	MPC · JPL
687631	2011 WS_{99}	—	September 7, 2007	La Cañada	Lacruz, J.	·	1.0 km	MPC · JPL
687632	2011 WF_{100}	—	December 13, 2006	Kitt Peak	Spacewatch	·	1.9 km	MPC · JPL
687633	2011 WM_{103}	—	November 3, 2011	Mount Lemmon	Mount Lemmon Survey	·	840 m	MPC · JPL
687634	2011 WU_{103}	—	November 17, 2011	Mayhill-ISON	L. Elenin	·	1.9 km	MPC · JPL
687635	2011 WV_{108}	—	November 30, 2011	Haleakala	Pan-STARRS 1	·	1.4 km	MPC · JPL
687636	2011 WM_{109}	—	October 26, 2011	Haleakala	Pan-STARRS 1	·	1.8 km	MPC · JPL
687637	2011 WF_{111}	—	November 30, 2011	Mount Lemmon	Mount Lemmon Survey	·	1.8 km	MPC · JPL
687638	2011 WA_{118}	—	November 18, 2011	Mount Lemmon	Mount Lemmon Survey	·	2.5 km	MPC · JPL
687639	2011 WJ_{118}	—	August 18, 2006	Kitt Peak	Spacewatch	·	1.7 km	MPC · JPL
687640	2011 WC_{121}	—	October 28, 2011	Mount Lemmon	Mount Lemmon Survey	·	2.3 km	MPC · JPL
687641	2011 WL_{123}	—	November 17, 2011	Mount Lemmon	Mount Lemmon Survey	·	2.4 km	MPC · JPL
687642	2011 WU_{123}	—	November 1, 2011	Mount Lemmon	Mount Lemmon Survey	·	2.6 km	MPC · JPL
687643	2011 WS_{127}	—	October 27, 2011	Mount Lemmon	Mount Lemmon Survey	·	2.1 km	MPC · JPL
687644	2011 WS_{129}	—	November 16, 2011	Mount Lemmon	Mount Lemmon Survey	·	1.7 km	MPC · JPL
687645	2011 WU_{132}	—	November 1, 2011	Zelenchukskaya Stn	T. V. Krjačko, Satovski, B.	·	730 m	MPC · JPL
687646	2011 WZ_{133}	—	March 11, 2008	Kitt Peak	Spacewatch	·	2.3 km	MPC · JPL
687647	2011 WO_{135}	—	December 24, 2006	Kitt Peak	Spacewatch	·	2.1 km	MPC · JPL
687648	2011 WZ_{147}	—	August 14, 2002	Palomar	NEAT	·	1.3 km	MPC · JPL
687649	2011 WS_{156}	—	April 24, 2009	Mount Lemmon	Mount Lemmon Survey	MAS	550 m	MPC · JPL
687650	2011 WK_{160}	—	December 13, 2017	Mount Lemmon	Mount Lemmon Survey	·	1.9 km	MPC · JPL
687651	2011 WO_{160}	—	November 23, 1997	Kitt Peak	Spacewatch	MRX	930 m	MPC · JPL
687652	2011 WT_{160}	—	October 12, 2016	Mount Lemmon	Mount Lemmon Survey	·	3.2 km	MPC · JPL
687653	2011 WJ_{161}	—	April 21, 2006	Kitt Peak	Spacewatch	·	940 m	MPC · JPL
687654	2011 WZ_{161}	—	November 23, 2011	Kitt Peak	Spacewatch	·	1.6 km	MPC · JPL
687655	2011 WN_{162}	—	September 27, 2016	Haleakala	Pan-STARRS 1	EOS	1.3 km	MPC · JPL
687656	2011 WQ_{162}	—	November 26, 2011	Mount Lemmon	Mount Lemmon Survey	·	1.9 km	MPC · JPL
687657	2011 WT_{162}	—	November 26, 2011	Mount Lemmon	Mount Lemmon Survey	TEL	990 m	MPC · JPL
687658	2011 WH_{163}	—	August 15, 2014	Haleakala	Pan-STARRS 1	·	2.9 km	MPC · JPL
687659	2011 WA_{164}	—	November 24, 2011	Haleakala	Pan-STARRS 1	·	2.6 km	MPC · JPL
687660	2011 WF_{164}	—	March 12, 2013	Mount Lemmon	Mount Lemmon Survey	L4	6.3 km	MPC · JPL
687661	2011 WX_{168}	—	April 29, 2014	Haleakala	Pan-STARRS 1	·	2.0 km	MPC · JPL
687662	2011 WB_{169}	—	December 23, 2017	Haleakala	Pan-STARRS 1	·	1.9 km	MPC · JPL
687663	2011 WR_{170}	—	February 7, 2013	Kitt Peak	Spacewatch	·	1.5 km	MPC · JPL
687664	2011 WA_{171}	—	January 13, 2018	Haleakala	Pan-STARRS 1	·	1.6 km	MPC · JPL
687665	2011 WF_{171}	—	October 12, 2015	Haleakala	Pan-STARRS 1	·	940 m	MPC · JPL
687666	2011 WM_{173}	—	June 26, 2015	Haleakala	Pan-STARRS 1	·	1.3 km	MPC · JPL
687667	2011 WZ_{173}	—	November 17, 2011	Mount Lemmon	Mount Lemmon Survey	EOS	1.3 km	MPC · JPL
687668	2011 WH_{174}	—	November 25, 2011	Haleakala	Pan-STARRS 1	·	1.4 km	MPC · JPL
687669	2011 WM_{174}	—	November 30, 2011	Kitt Peak	Spacewatch	·	920 m	MPC · JPL
687670	2011 WS_{174}	—	November 17, 2011	Mount Lemmon	Mount Lemmon Survey	·	870 m	MPC · JPL
687671	2011 WA_{175}	—	November 25, 2011	Haleakala	Pan-STARRS 1	·	800 m	MPC · JPL
687672	2011 WN_{175}	—	November 17, 2011	Kitt Peak	Spacewatch	·	1.4 km	MPC · JPL
687673	2011 WP_{176}	—	November 22, 2011	Mount Lemmon	Mount Lemmon Survey	KOR	1.2 km	MPC · JPL
687674	2011 WV_{178}	—	November 18, 2011	Mount Lemmon	Mount Lemmon Survey	·	1.4 km	MPC · JPL
687675	2011 WJ_{180}	—	September 14, 2007	Catalina	CSS	·	1 km	MPC · JPL
687676	2011 WV_{180}	—	November 30, 2011	Mount Lemmon	Mount Lemmon Survey	THB	1.8 km	MPC · JPL
687677	2011 WD_{181}	—	November 17, 2011	Mount Lemmon	Mount Lemmon Survey	·	580 m	MPC · JPL
687678	2011 WN_{183}	—	November 25, 2011	Haleakala	Pan-STARRS 1	·	2.8 km	MPC · JPL
687679	2011 WT_{183}	—	November 25, 2011	Haleakala	Pan-STARRS 1	·	1.3 km	MPC · JPL
687680	2011 WC_{184}	—	November 30, 2011	Mount Lemmon	Mount Lemmon Survey	EOS	1.5 km	MPC · JPL
687681	2011 WH_{184}	—	November 24, 2011	Haleakala	Pan-STARRS 1	EOS	1.2 km	MPC · JPL
687682	2011 WV_{185}	—	November 24, 2011	Mount Lemmon	Mount Lemmon Survey	EOS	1.5 km	MPC · JPL
687683	2011 WN_{189}	—	November 23, 2011	Mount Lemmon	Mount Lemmon Survey	·	1.6 km	MPC · JPL
687684	2011 XH_{2}	—	August 10, 2010	Kitt Peak	Spacewatch	EOS	1.3 km	MPC · JPL
687685	2011 XH_{3}	—	November 29, 1997	Kitt Peak	Spacewatch	TIN	1 km	MPC · JPL
687686	2011 XN_{4}	—	December 6, 2011	Haleakala	Pan-STARRS 1	·	1.4 km	MPC · JPL
687687	2011 XR_{5}	—	February 14, 2013	Haleakala	Pan-STARRS 1	·	1.4 km	MPC · JPL
687688	2011 XC_{6}	—	November 22, 2017	Haleakala	Pan-STARRS 1	·	1.9 km	MPC · JPL
687689	2011 YX_{1}	—	December 16, 2011	Haleakala	Pan-STARRS 1	·	2.1 km	MPC · JPL
687690	2011 YB_{4}	—	January 8, 1999	Kitt Peak	Spacewatch	·	640 m	MPC · JPL
687691	2011 YQ_{8}	—	December 25, 2011	Mount Lemmon	Mount Lemmon Survey	·	1.9 km	MPC · JPL
687692	2011 YY_{12}	—	February 8, 2008	Mount Lemmon	Mount Lemmon Survey	·	1.6 km	MPC · JPL
687693	2011 YR_{16}	—	November 23, 2006	Kitt Peak	Spacewatch	·	2.0 km	MPC · JPL
687694	2011 YO_{22}	—	December 25, 2011	Kitt Peak	Spacewatch	PHO	790 m	MPC · JPL
687695	2011 YY_{25}	—	December 4, 2007	Catalina	CSS	·	980 m	MPC · JPL
687696	2011 YT_{26}	—	December 26, 2011	Mount Lemmon	Mount Lemmon Survey	·	1.3 km	MPC · JPL
687697	2011 YU_{27}	—	September 26, 2003	Apache Point	SDSS Collaboration	NYS	990 m	MPC · JPL
687698	2011 YW_{31}	—	December 26, 2011	Kitt Peak	Spacewatch	·	1.8 km	MPC · JPL
687699	2011 YJ_{32}	—	December 26, 2011	Kitt Peak	Spacewatch	·	2.3 km	MPC · JPL
687700	2011 YZ_{32}	—	February 25, 2007	Mount Lemmon	Mount Lemmon Survey	·	2.4 km	MPC · JPL

== 687701–687800 ==
back to top

Designation			Discovery			Properties		Ref
Permanent	Provisional	Named after	Date	Site	Discoverer(s)	Category	Diam.	Ref
687701	2011 YM_{33}	—	December 26, 2011	Kitt Peak	Spacewatch	·	720 m	MPC · JPL
687702	2011 YV_{34}	—	December 26, 2011	Kitt Peak	Spacewatch	·	2.3 km	MPC · JPL
687703	2011 YO_{36}	—	December 26, 2011	Mount Lemmon	Mount Lemmon Survey	·	2.6 km	MPC · JPL
687704	2011 YV_{44}	—	November 26, 2011	Mount Lemmon	Mount Lemmon Survey	TIR	2.7 km	MPC · JPL
687705	2011 YE_{45}	—	December 27, 2011	Kitt Peak	Spacewatch	·	2.4 km	MPC · JPL
687706	2011 YP_{48}	—	November 28, 2011	Mount Lemmon	Mount Lemmon Survey	·	830 m	MPC · JPL
687707	2011 YS_{52}	—	December 27, 2011	Mount Lemmon	Mount Lemmon Survey	·	1.5 km	MPC · JPL
687708	2011 YW_{59}	—	December 29, 2011	Kitt Peak	Spacewatch	EOS	1.9 km	MPC · JPL
687709	2011 YF_{65}	—	October 24, 2007	Mount Lemmon	Mount Lemmon Survey	CLA	1.6 km	MPC · JPL
687710	2011 YP_{65}	—	March 2, 2008	Mount Lemmon	Mount Lemmon Survey	·	1.8 km	MPC · JPL
687711	2011 YM_{70}	—	December 16, 2011	Haleakala	Pan-STARRS 1	·	2.1 km	MPC · JPL
687712	2011 YW_{70}	—	December 24, 2011	Mount Lemmon	Mount Lemmon Survey	PHO	630 m	MPC · JPL
687713	2011 YQ_{71}	—	December 26, 2011	Kitt Peak	Spacewatch	·	2.4 km	MPC · JPL
687714	2011 YH_{72}	—	January 28, 2003	Apache Point	SDSS Collaboration	GEF	1.1 km	MPC · JPL
687715	2011 YF_{76}	—	September 29, 2005	Kitt Peak	Spacewatch	EOS	1.2 km	MPC · JPL
687716	2011 YO_{77}	—	January 20, 2012	Mount Lemmon	Mount Lemmon Survey	EOS	1.6 km	MPC · JPL
687717	2011 YU_{80}	—	December 25, 2006	Kitt Peak	Spacewatch	·	2.2 km	MPC · JPL
687718	2011 YV_{81}	—	December 30, 2011	Kitt Peak	Spacewatch	·	1.0 km	MPC · JPL
687719	2011 YN_{82}	—	November 20, 2017	Haleakala	Pan-STARRS 1	EUP	2.4 km	MPC · JPL
687720	2011 YB_{83}	—	October 7, 2016	Haleakala	Pan-STARRS 1	·	2.3 km	MPC · JPL
687721	2011 YE_{83}	—	December 27, 2011	Mount Lemmon	Mount Lemmon Survey	·	2.7 km	MPC · JPL
687722	2011 YK_{83}	—	December 29, 2011	Mount Lemmon	Mount Lemmon Survey	·	2.2 km	MPC · JPL
687723	2011 YT_{83}	—	July 25, 2015	Haleakala	Pan-STARRS 1	·	3.0 km	MPC · JPL
687724	2011 YA_{84}	—	July 4, 2014	Haleakala	Pan-STARRS 1	·	2.2 km	MPC · JPL
687725	2011 YF_{84}	—	December 31, 2011	Kitt Peak	Spacewatch	THB	1.9 km	MPC · JPL
687726	2011 YM_{84}	—	November 23, 2016	Mount Lemmon	Mount Lemmon Survey	·	2.0 km	MPC · JPL
687727	2011 YP_{84}	—	December 29, 2011	Mount Lemmon	Mount Lemmon Survey	·	2.2 km	MPC · JPL
687728	2011 YV_{84}	—	December 24, 2011	Charleston	R. Holmes	·	2.5 km	MPC · JPL
687729	2011 YS_{85}	—	December 30, 2011	Kitt Peak	Spacewatch	·	2.0 km	MPC · JPL
687730	2011 YH_{88}	—	September 9, 2015	Haleakala	Pan-STARRS 1	LIX	2.8 km	MPC · JPL
687731	2011 YO_{88}	—	December 29, 2011	Mount Lemmon	Mount Lemmon Survey	·	2.0 km	MPC · JPL
687732	2011 YU_{88}	—	December 6, 2015	Mount Lemmon	Mount Lemmon Survey	·	850 m	MPC · JPL
687733	2011 YE_{89}	—	December 29, 2011	Mount Lemmon	Mount Lemmon Survey	EOS	1.6 km	MPC · JPL
687734	2011 YL_{91}	—	December 29, 2011	Kitt Peak	Spacewatch	·	1.7 km	MPC · JPL
687735	2011 YZ_{91}	—	December 25, 2011	Kitt Peak	Spacewatch	EOS	1.4 km	MPC · JPL
687736	2011 YC_{92}	—	December 27, 2011	Mount Lemmon	Mount Lemmon Survey	TEL	1.0 km	MPC · JPL
687737	2011 YD_{92}	—	December 31, 2011	Kitt Peak	Spacewatch	·	750 m	MPC · JPL
687738	2011 YR_{92}	—	December 31, 2011	Kitt Peak	Spacewatch	·	530 m	MPC · JPL
687739	2011 YV_{92}	—	December 17, 2011	Mount Lemmon	Mount Lemmon Survey	·	940 m	MPC · JPL
687740	2011 YY_{92}	—	December 29, 2011	Kitt Peak	Spacewatch	EOS	1.2 km	MPC · JPL
687741	2011 YZ_{92}	—	December 29, 2011	Mount Lemmon	Mount Lemmon Survey	EOS	1.4 km	MPC · JPL
687742	2011 YT_{96}	—	December 25, 2011	Kitt Peak	Spacewatch	·	1.9 km	MPC · JPL
687743	2011 YZ_{96}	—	December 25, 2011	Mount Lemmon	Mount Lemmon Survey	EOS	1.6 km	MPC · JPL
687744	2011 YG_{97}	—	December 31, 2011	Kitt Peak	Spacewatch	·	2.0 km	MPC · JPL
687745	2011 YB_{98}	—	December 29, 2011	Mount Lemmon	Mount Lemmon Survey	·	2.2 km	MPC · JPL
687746	2011 YD_{98}	—	November 1, 2010	Mount Lemmon	Mount Lemmon Survey	·	1.6 km	MPC · JPL
687747	2012 AE_{2}	—	December 24, 2011	Mount Lemmon	Mount Lemmon Survey	EOS	2.0 km	MPC · JPL
687748	2012 AH_{2}	—	January 2, 2012	Mayhill-ISON	L. Elenin	·	2.0 km	MPC · JPL
687749	2012 AD_{5}	—	January 4, 2012	Mount Lemmon	Mount Lemmon Survey	NYS	870 m	MPC · JPL
687750	2012 AK_{10}	—	December 20, 2011	ESA OGS	ESA OGS	·	850 m	MPC · JPL
687751	2012 AU_{13}	—	January 14, 2012	Kitt Peak	Spacewatch	NYS	840 m	MPC · JPL
687752	2012 AA_{15}	—	December 25, 2011	Kitt Peak	Spacewatch	·	2.1 km	MPC · JPL
687753	2012 AQ_{18}	—	December 28, 2011	Mount Lemmon	Mount Lemmon Survey	·	1.7 km	MPC · JPL
687754	2012 AA_{27}	—	January 14, 2012	Haleakala	Pan-STARRS 1	EUP	2.8 km	MPC · JPL
687755	2012 AJ_{27}	—	January 2, 2012	Mount Lemmon	Mount Lemmon Survey	·	1.7 km	MPC · JPL
687756	2012 AO_{27}	—	April 30, 2014	Haleakala	Pan-STARRS 1	·	2.7 km	MPC · JPL
687757	2012 AA_{28}	—	January 6, 2012	Kitt Peak	Spacewatch	·	870 m	MPC · JPL
687758	2012 AB_{28}	—	December 26, 2005	Kitt Peak	Spacewatch	·	2.8 km	MPC · JPL
687759	2012 AD_{28}	—	October 9, 2016	Haleakala	Pan-STARRS 1	·	2.3 km	MPC · JPL
687760	2012 AP_{31}	—	January 1, 2012	Mount Lemmon	Mount Lemmon Survey	·	1.5 km	MPC · JPL
687761	2012 AB_{32}	—	January 1, 2012	Mount Lemmon	Mount Lemmon Survey	EOS	1.8 km	MPC · JPL
687762	2012 AC_{32}	—	January 2, 2012	Mount Lemmon	Mount Lemmon Survey	·	2.2 km	MPC · JPL
687763	2012 AE_{32}	—	January 4, 2012	Mount Lemmon	Mount Lemmon Survey	·	2.8 km	MPC · JPL
687764	2012 AO_{32}	—	January 4, 2012	Mount Lemmon	Mount Lemmon Survey	·	2.4 km	MPC · JPL
687765	2012 AS_{32}	—	January 2, 2012	Mount Lemmon	Mount Lemmon Survey	EOS	2.0 km	MPC · JPL
687766	2012 AY_{32}	—	January 1, 2012	Mount Lemmon	Mount Lemmon Survey	LIX	3.4 km	MPC · JPL
687767	2012 AN_{36}	—	January 1, 2012	Mount Lemmon	Mount Lemmon Survey	·	1.9 km	MPC · JPL
687768	2012 AL_{37}	—	January 2, 2012	Mount Lemmon	Mount Lemmon Survey	ELF	2.5 km	MPC · JPL
687769	2012 AR_{38}	—	January 4, 2012	Mount Lemmon	Mount Lemmon Survey	L4	6.0 km	MPC · JPL
687770	2012 BO	—	October 23, 2003	Kitt Peak	Spacewatch	·	1.0 km	MPC · JPL
687771	2012 BA_{7}	—	December 30, 2011	Kitt Peak	Spacewatch	·	1.8 km	MPC · JPL
687772	2012 BP_{8}	—	September 14, 2010	Kitt Peak	Spacewatch	KOR	1.1 km	MPC · JPL
687773	2012 BL_{9}	—	January 18, 2012	Kitt Peak	Spacewatch	·	3.1 km	MPC · JPL
687774	2012 BF_{29}	—	January 18, 2012	Mount Lemmon	Mount Lemmon Survey	EOS	1.8 km	MPC · JPL
687775	2012 BH_{29}	—	April 15, 2008	Mount Lemmon	Mount Lemmon Survey	·	2.9 km	MPC · JPL
687776	2012 BX_{29}	—	January 19, 2012	Haleakala	Pan-STARRS 1	·	2.7 km	MPC · JPL
687777	2012 BG_{36}	—	March 16, 2007	Mount Lemmon	Mount Lemmon Survey	·	1.8 km	MPC · JPL
687778	2012 BP_{39}	—	December 30, 2011	Kitt Peak	Spacewatch	VER	2.1 km	MPC · JPL
687779	2012 BS_{40}	—	April 22, 2009	Mount Lemmon	Mount Lemmon Survey	·	880 m	MPC · JPL
687780	2012 BY_{44}	—	October 12, 2010	Mount Lemmon	Mount Lemmon Survey	·	1.9 km	MPC · JPL
687781	2012 BH_{48}	—	January 20, 2012	Mount Lemmon	Mount Lemmon Survey	·	1.4 km	MPC · JPL
687782	2012 BR_{50}	—	October 8, 2010	Kitt Peak	Spacewatch	THM	1.8 km	MPC · JPL
687783	2012 BT_{50}	—	January 20, 2012	Mount Lemmon	Mount Lemmon Survey	EOS	1.3 km	MPC · JPL
687784	2012 BK_{51}	—	January 21, 2012	Kitt Peak	Spacewatch	·	1.7 km	MPC · JPL
687785	2012 BN_{57}	—	January 24, 2012	Haleakala	Pan-STARRS 1	·	2.1 km	MPC · JPL
687786	2012 BN_{59}	—	January 18, 2012	Mount Lemmon	Mount Lemmon Survey	·	2.3 km	MPC · JPL
687787	2012 BA_{60}	—	January 25, 2012	Haleakala	Pan-STARRS 1	·	2.2 km	MPC · JPL
687788	2012 BL_{62}	—	January 2, 2012	Kitt Peak	Spacewatch	·	2.1 km	MPC · JPL
687789	2012 BG_{64}	—	January 20, 2012	Mount Lemmon	Mount Lemmon Survey	·	1.2 km	MPC · JPL
687790	2012 BH_{64}	—	June 19, 2010	Mount Lemmon	Mount Lemmon Survey	PHO	870 m	MPC · JPL
687791	2012 BN_{64}	—	October 13, 2005	Kitt Peak	Spacewatch	·	1.6 km	MPC · JPL
687792	2012 BH_{65}	—	October 25, 2001	Apache Point	SDSS Collaboration	·	1.7 km	MPC · JPL
687793	2012 BP_{65}	—	November 1, 2005	Mount Lemmon	Mount Lemmon Survey	·	1.7 km	MPC · JPL
687794	2012 BB_{66}	—	January 20, 2012	Mount Lemmon	Mount Lemmon Survey	·	2.0 km	MPC · JPL
687795	2012 BJ_{66}	—	January 2, 2012	Mount Lemmon	Mount Lemmon Survey	PHO	660 m	MPC · JPL
687796	2012 BV_{68}	—	January 21, 2012	Kitt Peak	Spacewatch	·	2.6 km	MPC · JPL
687797	2012 BX_{68}	—	November 4, 2005	Kitt Peak	Spacewatch	·	1.9 km	MPC · JPL
687798	2012 BV_{70}	—	January 21, 2012	Kitt Peak	Spacewatch	·	2.8 km	MPC · JPL
687799	2012 BN_{72}	—	January 21, 2012	Kitt Peak	Spacewatch	·	2.2 km	MPC · JPL
687800	2012 BT_{74}	—	January 24, 2012	Haleakala	Pan-STARRS 1	·	1.9 km	MPC · JPL

== 687801–687900 ==
back to top

Designation			Discovery			Properties		Ref
Permanent	Provisional	Named after	Date	Site	Discoverer(s)	Category	Diam.	Ref
687801	2012 BC_{82}	—	January 27, 2012	Mount Lemmon	Mount Lemmon Survey	THM	1.5 km	MPC · JPL
687802	2012 BL_{84}	—	January 27, 2012	Mount Lemmon	Mount Lemmon Survey	MAS	620 m	MPC · JPL
687803	2012 BF_{89}	—	December 28, 2005	Mount Lemmon	Mount Lemmon Survey	·	2.0 km	MPC · JPL
687804	2012 BL_{89}	—	November 26, 2011	Mount Lemmon	Mount Lemmon Survey	THB	2.4 km	MPC · JPL
687805	2012 BQ_{90}	—	December 22, 2005	Kitt Peak	Spacewatch	·	2.8 km	MPC · JPL
687806	2012 BZ_{93}	—	September 13, 2005	Kitt Peak	Spacewatch	HOF	2.5 km	MPC · JPL
687807	2012 BF_{94}	—	January 17, 2007	Kitt Peak	Spacewatch	·	1.6 km	MPC · JPL
687808	2012 BT_{94}	—	January 20, 2012	Kitt Peak	Spacewatch	AGN	1.0 km	MPC · JPL
687809	2012 BP_{95}	—	January 29, 2012	Mount Lemmon	Mount Lemmon Survey	EOS	1.6 km	MPC · JPL
687810	2012 BP_{106}	—	January 25, 2012	Haleakala	Pan-STARRS 1	·	2.3 km	MPC · JPL
687811	2012 BC_{109}	—	January 27, 2012	Kitt Peak	Spacewatch	·	2.4 km	MPC · JPL
687812	2012 BC_{110}	—	January 27, 2012	Mount Lemmon	Mount Lemmon Survey	TIR	2.4 km	MPC · JPL
687813	2012 BJ_{113}	—	January 27, 2012	Mount Lemmon	Mount Lemmon Survey	·	930 m	MPC · JPL
687814	2012 BT_{113}	—	January 20, 2012	Kitt Peak	Spacewatch	·	2.5 km	MPC · JPL
687815	2012 BK_{116}	—	December 25, 2005	Mount Lemmon	Mount Lemmon Survey	·	2.0 km	MPC · JPL
687816	2012 BE_{120}	—	January 29, 2012	Kitt Peak	Spacewatch	·	2.3 km	MPC · JPL
687817	2012 BL_{120}	—	August 18, 2009	Kitt Peak	Spacewatch	EMA	3.0 km	MPC · JPL
687818	2012 BD_{125}	—	December 27, 2011	Mount Lemmon	Mount Lemmon Survey	·	2.6 km	MPC · JPL
687819	2012 BU_{125}	—	January 1, 2012	Mount Lemmon	Mount Lemmon Survey	·	1.0 km	MPC · JPL
687820	2012 BD_{136}	—	November 10, 2006	Kitt Peak	Spacewatch	·	2.1 km	MPC · JPL
687821	2012 BJ_{139}	—	December 22, 2005	Needville	Dillon, W. G.	·	2.7 km	MPC · JPL
687822	2012 BH_{140}	—	January 2, 2012	Mount Lemmon	Mount Lemmon Survey	·	2.3 km	MPC · JPL
687823	2012 BJ_{141}	—	October 28, 2005	Mount Lemmon	Mount Lemmon Survey	·	3.7 km	MPC · JPL
687824	2012 BR_{141}	—	October 8, 2010	Kitt Peak	Spacewatch	·	1.7 km	MPC · JPL
687825	2012 BH_{142}	—	December 28, 2011	Kitt Peak	Spacewatch	·	2.9 km	MPC · JPL
687826	2012 BO_{142}	—	January 24, 2012	Haleakala	Pan-STARRS 1	·	2.4 km	MPC · JPL
687827	2012 BM_{144}	—	January 26, 2012	Mount Lemmon	Mount Lemmon Survey	VER	2.3 km	MPC · JPL
687828	2012 BA_{145}	—	January 26, 2012	Mount Lemmon	Mount Lemmon Survey	·	2.3 km	MPC · JPL
687829	2012 BE_{152}	—	January 26, 2012	Mount Lemmon	Mount Lemmon Survey	NYS	1.0 km	MPC · JPL
687830	2012 BD_{153}	—	December 29, 2011	Kitt Peak	Spacewatch	·	2.1 km	MPC · JPL
687831	2012 BE_{156}	—	February 21, 2001	Kitt Peak	Spacewatch	·	2.5 km	MPC · JPL
687832	2012 BH_{156}	—	October 7, 2005	Mount Lemmon	Mount Lemmon Survey	·	1.8 km	MPC · JPL
687833	2012 BJ_{156}	—	January 20, 2012	Mount Lemmon	Mount Lemmon Survey	·	1.7 km	MPC · JPL
687834	2012 BS_{157}	—	January 19, 2012	Haleakala	Pan-STARRS 1	·	2.4 km	MPC · JPL
687835	2012 BB_{158}	—	January 19, 2012	Haleakala	Pan-STARRS 1	·	3.5 km	MPC · JPL
687836	2012 BE_{158}	—	January 19, 2012	Haleakala	Pan-STARRS 1	·	2.9 km	MPC · JPL
687837	2012 BW_{158}	—	January 26, 2012	Mount Lemmon	Mount Lemmon Survey	·	2.2 km	MPC · JPL
687838	2012 BE_{160}	—	January 22, 2012	Haleakala	Pan-STARRS 1	EOS	1.5 km	MPC · JPL
687839	2012 BK_{160}	—	January 20, 2012	Mount Lemmon	Mount Lemmon Survey	·	2.5 km	MPC · JPL
687840	2012 BU_{161}	—	January 22, 2012	Haleakala	Pan-STARRS 1	·	2.2 km	MPC · JPL
687841	2012 BN_{162}	—	February 21, 2007	Mount Lemmon	Mount Lemmon Survey	THM	1.7 km	MPC · JPL
687842	2012 BO_{162}	—	January 27, 2012	Mount Lemmon	Mount Lemmon Survey	·	1.8 km	MPC · JPL
687843	2012 BC_{163}	—	November 28, 2016	Haleakala	Pan-STARRS 1	·	1.8 km	MPC · JPL
687844	2012 BR_{163}	—	January 30, 2006	Kitt Peak	Spacewatch	·	2.6 km	MPC · JPL
687845	2012 BT_{163}	—	January 25, 2012	Haleakala	Pan-STARRS 1	·	2.3 km	MPC · JPL
687846	2012 BY_{169}	—	January 19, 2012	Mount Lemmon	Mount Lemmon Survey	·	2.5 km	MPC · JPL
687847	2012 BD_{172}	—	January 27, 2012	Mount Lemmon	Mount Lemmon Survey	EOS	1.6 km	MPC · JPL
687848	2012 BW_{172}	—	September 12, 2016	Haleakala	Pan-STARRS 1	·	2.3 km	MPC · JPL
687849	2012 BF_{175}	—	January 21, 2012	Kitt Peak	Spacewatch	NYS	940 m	MPC · JPL
687850	2012 BQ_{175}	—	January 20, 2012	Mount Lemmon	Mount Lemmon Survey	·	2.7 km	MPC · JPL
687851	2012 BZ_{175}	—	January 26, 2012	Kitt Peak	Spacewatch	·	2.3 km	MPC · JPL
687852	2012 BT_{176}	—	January 21, 2012	Kitt Peak	Spacewatch	·	2.1 km	MPC · JPL
687853	2012 BB_{177}	—	January 26, 2012	Mount Lemmon	Mount Lemmon Survey	EOS	1.6 km	MPC · JPL
687854	2012 BD_{177}	—	January 19, 2012	Haleakala	Pan-STARRS 1	·	2.6 km	MPC · JPL
687855	2012 BH_{177}	—	January 19, 2012	Haleakala	Pan-STARRS 1	·	2.2 km	MPC · JPL
687856	2012 BJ_{177}	—	January 20, 2012	Mount Lemmon	Mount Lemmon Survey	·	2.3 km	MPC · JPL
687857	2012 BK_{177}	—	January 19, 2012	Haleakala	Pan-STARRS 1	·	2.5 km	MPC · JPL
687858	2012 BN_{177}	—	January 20, 2012	Mount Lemmon	Mount Lemmon Survey	·	2.0 km	MPC · JPL
687859	2012 BW_{177}	—	January 19, 2012	Haleakala	Pan-STARRS 1	·	2.1 km	MPC · JPL
687860	2012 BZ_{177}	—	January 19, 2012	Catalina	CSS	·	3.3 km	MPC · JPL
687861	2012 BJ_{178}	—	January 27, 2012	Mount Lemmon	Mount Lemmon Survey	·	2.5 km	MPC · JPL
687862	2012 BR_{178}	—	January 25, 2012	Haleakala	Pan-STARRS 1	EOS	1.5 km	MPC · JPL
687863	2012 BS_{178}	—	January 26, 2012	Mount Lemmon	Mount Lemmon Survey	·	3.1 km	MPC · JPL
687864	2012 BW_{178}	—	January 19, 2012	Haleakala	Pan-STARRS 1	VER	2.3 km	MPC · JPL
687865	2012 BX_{178}	—	January 18, 2012	Mount Lemmon	Mount Lemmon Survey	·	530 m	MPC · JPL
687866	2012 BB_{179}	—	January 27, 2012	Mount Lemmon	Mount Lemmon Survey	EOS	1.6 km	MPC · JPL
687867	2012 BQ_{180}	—	January 19, 2012	Kitt Peak	Spacewatch	·	2.9 km	MPC · JPL
687868	2012 BB_{181}	—	January 26, 2012	Haleakala	Pan-STARRS 1	L4	6.6 km	MPC · JPL
687869	2012 BU_{182}	—	January 19, 2012	Haleakala	Pan-STARRS 1	HYG	2.4 km	MPC · JPL
687870	2012 BM_{185}	—	January 18, 2012	Mount Lemmon	Mount Lemmon Survey	·	2.3 km	MPC · JPL
687871	2012 BS_{185}	—	January 30, 2012	Mount Lemmon	Mount Lemmon Survey	EOS	1.5 km	MPC · JPL
687872	2012 BV_{185}	—	January 26, 2012	Mount Lemmon	Mount Lemmon Survey	·	2.0 km	MPC · JPL
687873	2012 BY_{185}	—	January 30, 2012	Mount Lemmon	Mount Lemmon Survey	·	2.3 km	MPC · JPL
687874	2012 BE_{186}	—	January 19, 2012	Haleakala	Pan-STARRS 1	·	2.2 km	MPC · JPL
687875	2012 BH_{186}	—	January 24, 2012	Haleakala	Pan-STARRS 1	EOS	1.3 km	MPC · JPL
687876	2012 BQ_{186}	—	January 19, 2012	Haleakala	Pan-STARRS 1	·	700 m	MPC · JPL
687877	2012 BG_{187}	—	January 19, 2012	Haleakala	Pan-STARRS 1	·	1.7 km	MPC · JPL
687878	2012 BA_{188}	—	January 20, 2012	Kitt Peak	Spacewatch	L4	6.5 km	MPC · JPL
687879	2012 CM_{8}	—	February 3, 2012	Haleakala	Pan-STARRS 1	·	2.3 km	MPC · JPL
687880	2012 CU_{10}	—	November 4, 2010	Mount Lemmon	Mount Lemmon Survey	·	2.1 km	MPC · JPL
687881	2012 CH_{13}	—	December 30, 2005	Kitt Peak	Spacewatch	·	2.4 km	MPC · JPL
687882	2012 CR_{14}	—	December 31, 2007	Mount Lemmon	Mount Lemmon Survey	·	920 m	MPC · JPL
687883	2012 CU_{16}	—	March 11, 2007	Mount Lemmon	Mount Lemmon Survey	·	2.7 km	MPC · JPL
687884	2012 CO_{18}	—	January 1, 2012	Mount Lemmon	Mount Lemmon Survey	·	2.7 km	MPC · JPL
687885	2012 CQ_{19}	—	February 11, 2012	Mount Lemmon	Mount Lemmon Survey	·	710 m	MPC · JPL
687886	2012 CK_{23}	—	March 13, 2007	Mount Lemmon	Mount Lemmon Survey	LIX	3.0 km	MPC · JPL
687887	2012 CP_{23}	—	March 13, 2007	Mount Lemmon	Mount Lemmon Survey	·	2.3 km	MPC · JPL
687888	2012 CV_{24}	—	January 19, 2012	Haleakala	Pan-STARRS 1	·	2.6 km	MPC · JPL
687889	2012 CZ_{26}	—	March 19, 2007	Mount Lemmon	Mount Lemmon Survey	·	2.0 km	MPC · JPL
687890	2012 CF_{27}	—	January 27, 2007	Kitt Peak	Spacewatch	·	1.7 km	MPC · JPL
687891	2012 CV_{29}	—	February 1, 2012	Kitt Peak	Spacewatch	·	2.6 km	MPC · JPL
687892	2012 CZ_{30}	—	December 25, 2005	Kitt Peak	Spacewatch	·	2.4 km	MPC · JPL
687893	2012 CX_{32}	—	December 13, 2006	Kitt Peak	Spacewatch	·	1.7 km	MPC · JPL
687894	2012 CJ_{34}	—	November 3, 2007	Kitt Peak	Spacewatch	·	730 m	MPC · JPL
687895	2012 CD_{35}	—	August 25, 2000	Cerro Tololo	Deep Ecliptic Survey	HOF	2.1 km	MPC · JPL
687896	2012 CC_{36}	—	January 19, 2012	Haleakala	Pan-STARRS 1	·	2.0 km	MPC · JPL
687897	2012 CT_{39}	—	February 3, 2012	Haleakala	Pan-STARRS 1	·	960 m	MPC · JPL
687898	2012 CE_{48}	—	August 23, 2004	Kitt Peak	Spacewatch	·	1.8 km	MPC · JPL
687899	2012 CL_{48}	—	January 30, 2012	Mount Lemmon	Mount Lemmon Survey	·	2.4 km	MPC · JPL
687900	2012 CL_{53}	—	February 15, 2012	Haleakala	Pan-STARRS 1	EOS	1.7 km	MPC · JPL

== 687901–688000 ==
back to top

Designation			Discovery			Properties		Ref
Permanent	Provisional	Named after	Date	Site	Discoverer(s)	Category	Diam.	Ref
687901	2012 CO_{53}	—	November 26, 2011	Mount Lemmon	Mount Lemmon Survey	·	2.7 km	MPC · JPL
687902	2012 CO_{54}	—	March 25, 2007	Mount Lemmon	Mount Lemmon Survey	·	2.0 km	MPC · JPL
687903	2012 CW_{55}	—	January 3, 2012	Mount Lemmon	Mount Lemmon Survey	VER	2.4 km	MPC · JPL
687904	2012 CB_{56}	—	January 29, 2012	Kitt Peak	Spacewatch	·	1.1 km	MPC · JPL
687905	2012 CG_{58}	—	February 3, 2012	Haleakala	Pan-STARRS 1	VER	2.0 km	MPC · JPL
687906	2012 CN_{58}	—	February 3, 2012	Haleakala	Pan-STARRS 1	·	2.3 km	MPC · JPL
687907	2012 CR_{58}	—	February 1, 2012	Kitt Peak	Spacewatch	·	2.1 km	MPC · JPL
687908	2012 CJ_{59}	—	February 3, 2012	Haleakala	Pan-STARRS 1	V	480 m	MPC · JPL
687909	2012 CM_{59}	—	February 13, 2012	Haleakala	Pan-STARRS 1	·	2.2 km	MPC · JPL
687910	2012 CF_{61}	—	August 24, 2003	Cerro Tololo	Deep Ecliptic Survey	·	2.3 km	MPC · JPL
687911	2012 CP_{61}	—	July 14, 2013	Haleakala	Pan-STARRS 1	·	830 m	MPC · JPL
687912	2012 CJ_{62}	—	December 25, 2005	Mount Lemmon	Mount Lemmon Survey	·	1.9 km	MPC · JPL
687913	2012 CL_{63}	—	December 3, 2015	Haleakala	Pan-STARRS 1	·	2.1 km	MPC · JPL
687914	2012 CY_{63}	—	May 12, 2013	Kitt Peak	Spacewatch	·	2.3 km	MPC · JPL
687915	2012 CA_{64}	—	November 8, 2015	Haleakala	Pan-STARRS 1	EOS	1.4 km	MPC · JPL
687916	2012 CQ_{66}	—	February 3, 2012	Haleakala	Pan-STARRS 1	AGN	810 m	MPC · JPL
687917	2012 CS_{67}	—	February 14, 2012	Haleakala	Pan-STARRS 1	·	1.3 km	MPC · JPL
687918	2012 CT_{67}	—	February 15, 2012	Haleakala	Pan-STARRS 1	EOS	1.6 km	MPC · JPL
687919	2012 CU_{67}	—	November 27, 2010	Mount Lemmon	Mount Lemmon Survey	THM	2.0 km	MPC · JPL
687920	2012 CB_{68}	—	February 15, 2012	Haleakala	Pan-STARRS 1	THM	1.7 km	MPC · JPL
687921	2012 CM_{68}	—	February 15, 2012	Haleakala	Pan-STARRS 1	·	2.1 km	MPC · JPL
687922	2012 CR_{68}	—	February 3, 2012	Mount Lemmon	Mount Lemmon Survey	EOS	1.5 km	MPC · JPL
687923	2012 CD_{70}	—	February 3, 2012	Haleakala	Pan-STARRS 1	THM	1.6 km	MPC · JPL
687924	2012 CT_{70}	—	February 13, 2012	Haleakala	Pan-STARRS 1	·	2.5 km	MPC · JPL
687925	2012 CF_{71}	—	February 13, 2001	Kitt Peak	Spacewatch	·	2.2 km	MPC · JPL
687926	2012 CW_{71}	—	February 3, 2012	Mount Lemmon	Mount Lemmon Survey	·	2.0 km	MPC · JPL
687927	2012 CW_{73}	—	February 4, 2012	Haleakala	Pan-STARRS 1	·	2.3 km	MPC · JPL
687928	2012 CV_{74}	—	December 4, 2016	Mount Lemmon	Mount Lemmon Survey	VER	2.0 km	MPC · JPL
687929	2012 CF_{75}	—	February 1, 2012	Mount Lemmon	Mount Lemmon Survey	L4	5.4 km	MPC · JPL
687930	2012 DY_{2}	—	November 4, 2005	Kitt Peak	Spacewatch	KOR	1.4 km	MPC · JPL
687931	2012 DA_{3}	—	January 30, 2012	Kitt Peak	Spacewatch	·	2.5 km	MPC · JPL
687932	2012 DP_{5}	—	February 16, 2012	Haleakala	Pan-STARRS 1	V	510 m	MPC · JPL
687933	2012 DG_{6}	—	January 31, 2012	Catalina	CSS	·	3.2 km	MPC · JPL
687934	2012 DJ_{6}	—	February 18, 2010	Mount Lemmon	Mount Lemmon Survey	·	280 m	MPC · JPL
687935	2012 DT_{8}	—	October 17, 1995	Kitt Peak	Spacewatch	NYS	950 m	MPC · JPL
687936	2012 DK_{12}	—	February 19, 2012	Kitt Peak	Spacewatch	·	760 m	MPC · JPL
687937	2012 DA_{13}	—	February 25, 2007	Mount Lemmon	Mount Lemmon Survey	·	2.5 km	MPC · JPL
687938	2012 DE_{15}	—	February 20, 2012	Charleston	R. Holmes	EOS	1.6 km	MPC · JPL
687939	2012 DS_{15}	—	September 15, 2009	Kitt Peak	Spacewatch	·	2.5 km	MPC · JPL
687940	2012 DL_{28}	—	February 22, 2012	Kitt Peak	Spacewatch	·	780 m	MPC · JPL
687941	2012 DO_{30}	—	February 19, 2012	Catalina	CSS	EUP	3.3 km	MPC · JPL
687942	2012 DN_{37}	—	February 14, 2012	Haleakala	Pan-STARRS 1	·	2.3 km	MPC · JPL
687943	2012 DW_{50}	—	January 13, 2005	Kitt Peak	Spacewatch	·	640 m	MPC · JPL
687944	2012 DL_{57}	—	February 25, 2012	Mount Lemmon	Mount Lemmon Survey	·	2.1 km	MPC · JPL
687945	2012 DK_{65}	—	January 19, 2008	Kitt Peak	Spacewatch	·	720 m	MPC · JPL
687946	2012 DN_{65}	—	January 19, 2012	Mount Lemmon	Mount Lemmon Survey	·	2.4 km	MPC · JPL
687947	2012 DP_{66}	—	February 24, 2012	Mount Lemmon	Mount Lemmon Survey	·	2.2 km	MPC · JPL
687948	2012 DU_{67}	—	February 25, 2012	Kitt Peak	Spacewatch	·	3.3 km	MPC · JPL
687949	2012 DK_{68}	—	February 25, 2012	Mount Lemmon	Mount Lemmon Survey	·	3.3 km	MPC · JPL
687950	2012 DJ_{70}	—	February 25, 2012	Mount Lemmon	Mount Lemmon Survey	·	1.5 km	MPC · JPL
687951	2012 DB_{80}	—	April 18, 2005	Kitt Peak	Spacewatch	·	1.2 km	MPC · JPL
687952	2012 DL_{84}	—	January 21, 2012	Kitt Peak	Spacewatch	·	3.3 km	MPC · JPL
687953	2012 DS_{84}	—	February 26, 2012	Haleakala	Pan-STARRS 1	·	2.5 km	MPC · JPL
687954	2012 DW_{84}	—	January 19, 2012	Haleakala	Pan-STARRS 1	·	860 m	MPC · JPL
687955	2012 DR_{85}	—	November 15, 2010	Mount Lemmon	Mount Lemmon Survey	THB	2.3 km	MPC · JPL
687956	2012 DY_{88}	—	February 23, 2012	Catalina	CSS	·	2.6 km	MPC · JPL
687957	2012 DQ_{92}	—	September 28, 2000	Kitt Peak	Spacewatch	AGN	960 m	MPC · JPL
687958	2012 DQ_{93}	—	February 19, 2012	Mount Lemmon	Mount Lemmon Survey	EOS	1.3 km	MPC · JPL
687959	2012 DT_{93}	—	February 23, 2012	Mount Lemmon	Mount Lemmon Survey	·	2.4 km	MPC · JPL
687960	2012 DC_{96}	—	February 23, 2012	Mount Lemmon	Mount Lemmon Survey	·	2.4 km	MPC · JPL
687961	2012 DC_{97}	—	February 24, 2012	Catalina	CSS	TIR	2.4 km	MPC · JPL
687962	2012 DF_{97}	—	February 24, 2012	Palomar	Palomar Transient Factory	·	2.2 km	MPC · JPL
687963	2012 DK_{97}	—	October 28, 2010	Mount Lemmon	Mount Lemmon Survey	LUT	3.6 km	MPC · JPL
687964	2012 DK_{100}	—	February 23, 2012	Mount Lemmon	Mount Lemmon Survey	·	2.5 km	MPC · JPL
687965	2012 DP_{100}	—	February 27, 2012	Haleakala	Pan-STARRS 1	EOS	1.4 km	MPC · JPL
687966	2012 DJ_{101}	—	February 27, 2012	Haleakala	Pan-STARRS 1	·	2.2 km	MPC · JPL
687967	2012 DQ_{102}	—	February 23, 2012	Mount Lemmon	Mount Lemmon Survey	MRX	880 m	MPC · JPL
687968	2012 DM_{103}	—	February 2, 2001	Kitt Peak	Spacewatch	·	1.7 km	MPC · JPL
687969	2012 DC_{105}	—	February 28, 2012	Haleakala	Pan-STARRS 1	·	680 m	MPC · JPL
687970	2012 DU_{105}	—	February 28, 2012	Haleakala	Pan-STARRS 1	THM	2.0 km	MPC · JPL
687971	2012 DN_{106}	—	April 26, 2007	Mount Lemmon	Mount Lemmon Survey	T_{j} (2.98)	3.3 km	MPC · JPL
687972	2012 DV_{107}	—	February 21, 2012	Kitt Peak	Spacewatch	·	2.4 km	MPC · JPL
687973	2012 DV_{111}	—	April 15, 2018	Mount Lemmon	Mount Lemmon Survey	EOS	1.9 km	MPC · JPL
687974	2012 DK_{112}	—	May 11, 2013	Mount Lemmon	Mount Lemmon Survey	LIX	2.7 km	MPC · JPL
687975	2012 DX_{112}	—	March 18, 2018	Haleakala	Pan-STARRS 1	·	2.3 km	MPC · JPL
687976	2012 DL_{114}	—	December 22, 2016	Haleakala	Pan-STARRS 1	·	2.4 km	MPC · JPL
687977	2012 DX_{117}	—	February 16, 2012	Haleakala	Pan-STARRS 1	·	2.3 km	MPC · JPL
687978	2012 DL_{118}	—	February 27, 2012	Haleakala	Pan-STARRS 1	·	880 m	MPC · JPL
687979	2012 DA_{119}	—	February 24, 2012	Kitt Peak	Spacewatch	·	2.7 km	MPC · JPL
687980	2012 DZ_{119}	—	February 27, 2012	Haleakala	Pan-STARRS 1	EOS	1.1 km	MPC · JPL
687981	2012 DK_{120}	—	February 19, 2012	Kitt Peak	Spacewatch	·	2.1 km	MPC · JPL
687982	2012 DV_{120}	—	February 23, 2012	Mount Lemmon	Mount Lemmon Survey	·	2.4 km	MPC · JPL
687983	2012 DX_{121}	—	February 27, 2012	Haleakala	Pan-STARRS 1	·	1.3 km	MPC · JPL
687984	2012 DF_{122}	—	February 23, 2012	Mount Lemmon	Mount Lemmon Survey	·	2.6 km	MPC · JPL
687985	2012 DA_{123}	—	February 28, 2012	Haleakala	Pan-STARRS 1	·	2.0 km	MPC · JPL
687986	2012 DO_{125}	—	February 28, 2012	Haleakala	Pan-STARRS 1	·	2.2 km	MPC · JPL
687987	2012 DU_{125}	—	February 20, 2012	Haleakala	Pan-STARRS 1	·	2.1 km	MPC · JPL
687988	2012 DX_{126}	—	February 16, 2012	Haleakala	Pan-STARRS 1	·	1.9 km	MPC · JPL
687989	2012 DT_{127}	—	February 16, 2012	Haleakala	Pan-STARRS 1	EOS	1.5 km	MPC · JPL
687990	2012 DZ_{127}	—	February 22, 2012	Charleston	R. Holmes	VER	2.0 km	MPC · JPL
687991	2012 DU_{129}	—	February 27, 2012	Haleakala	Pan-STARRS 1	·	2.1 km	MPC · JPL
687992	2012 DO_{130}	—	February 28, 2012	Haleakala	Pan-STARRS 1	·	2.1 km	MPC · JPL
687993	2012 EV_{1}	—	February 26, 2012	Haleakala	Pan-STARRS 1	EMA	2.5 km	MPC · JPL
687994	2012 EU_{7}	—	February 24, 2012	Mount Lemmon	Mount Lemmon Survey	·	2.7 km	MPC · JPL
687995	2012 EG_{13}	—	March 15, 2012	Mount Lemmon	Mount Lemmon Survey	VER	2.0 km	MPC · JPL
687996	2012 EQ_{14}	—	November 4, 2010	Mount Lemmon	Mount Lemmon Survey	·	2.3 km	MPC · JPL
687997	2012 EV_{17}	—	March 4, 2012	Mount Lemmon	Mount Lemmon Survey	·	1.5 km	MPC · JPL
687998	2012 EN_{19}	—	March 3, 2012	Kitt Peak	Spacewatch	·	2.2 km	MPC · JPL
687999	2012 EV_{19}	—	March 15, 2012	Kitt Peak	Spacewatch	·	960 m	MPC · JPL
688000	2012 EB_{23}	—	January 18, 2012	Mount Lemmon	Mount Lemmon Survey	·	2.9 km	MPC · JPL

back to top
