= List of minor planets: 655001–656000 =

The following is a partial list of minor planets, running from minor-planet number 655001 through 656000, inclusive. The primary data for this and other partial lists is based on JPL's "Small-Body Orbital Elements" and data available from the Minor Planet Center. Critical list information is also provided by the MPC, unless otherwise specified from Lowell Observatory. A detailed description of the table's columns and additional sources are given on the main page including a complete list of every page in this series, and a statistical break-up on the dynamical classification of minor planets.

Also see the summary list of all named bodies in numerical and alphabetical order, and the corresponding naming citations for the number range of this particular list. New namings may only be added to this list after official publication, as the preannouncement of names is condemned by the Working Group for Small Bodies Nomenclature of the International Astronomical Union.

Near-Earth obj.	MBA (inner)	MBA (outer)	Centaur
Mars-crosser	MBA (middle)	Jupiter trojan	Trans-Neptunian obj.
Unclassified

== 655001–655100 ==
Designation			Discovery			Properties		Ref
Permanent	Provisional	Named after	Date	Site	Discoverer(s)	Category	Diam.	Ref
655001	2015 FF_{252}	—	March 23, 2015	Haleakala	Pan-STARRS 1	EOS	1.3 km	MPC · JPL
655002	2015 FK_{255}	—	May 16, 2012	Mount Lemmon	Mount Lemmon Survey	·	460 m	MPC · JPL
655003	2015 FU_{255}	—	March 23, 2015	Haleakala	Pan-STARRS 1	KOR	1.1 km	MPC · JPL
655004	2015 FP_{256}	—	July 18, 2007	Mount Lemmon	Mount Lemmon Survey	·	1.9 km	MPC · JPL
655005	2015 FQ_{257}	—	March 23, 2015	Haleakala	Pan-STARRS 1	·	1.7 km	MPC · JPL
655006	2015 FB_{258}	—	March 23, 2015	Haleakala	Pan-STARRS 1	·	1.8 km	MPC · JPL
655007	2015 FB_{259}	—	November 1, 2006	Kitt Peak	Spacewatch	·	2.3 km	MPC · JPL
655008	2015 FC_{259}	—	September 17, 2009	Kitt Peak	Spacewatch	·	590 m	MPC · JPL
655009	2015 FR_{259}	—	March 24, 2015	Haleakala	Pan-STARRS 1	·	500 m	MPC · JPL
655010	2015 FX_{259}	—	March 24, 2015	Haleakala	Pan-STARRS 1	·	1.9 km	MPC · JPL
655011	2015 FN_{260}	—	May 22, 2011	Mount Lemmon	Mount Lemmon Survey	·	1.6 km	MPC · JPL
655012	2015 FV_{263}	—	March 17, 2012	Kitt Peak	Spacewatch	·	600 m	MPC · JPL
655013	2015 FP_{265}	—	November 1, 2008	Mount Lemmon	Mount Lemmon Survey	·	1.8 km	MPC · JPL
655014	2015 FR_{265}	—	April 27, 2011	Mount Lemmon	Mount Lemmon Survey	·	1.4 km	MPC · JPL
655015	2015 FA_{267}	—	March 11, 2015	Mount Lemmon	Mount Lemmon Survey	EOS	1.5 km	MPC · JPL
655016	2015 FK_{267}	—	October 6, 2008	Mount Lemmon	Mount Lemmon Survey	·	1.5 km	MPC · JPL
655017	2015 FG_{269}	—	February 26, 2004	Kitt Peak	Deep Ecliptic Survey	·	1.0 km	MPC · JPL
655018	2015 FL_{271}	—	September 14, 2007	Catalina	CSS	·	2.2 km	MPC · JPL
655019	2015 FF_{272}	—	October 29, 2003	Kitt Peak	Spacewatch	·	690 m	MPC · JPL
655020	2015 FH_{272}	—	April 24, 2012	Mount Lemmon	Mount Lemmon Survey	PHO	740 m	MPC · JPL
655021	2015 FE_{276}	—	November 20, 2003	Apache Point	SDSS Collaboration	·	2.0 km	MPC · JPL
655022	2015 FQ_{279}	—	September 22, 2012	Kitt Peak	Spacewatch	·	1.8 km	MPC · JPL
655023	2015 FF_{282}	—	November 1, 2008	Mount Lemmon	Mount Lemmon Survey	·	1.4 km	MPC · JPL
655024	2015 FH_{283}	—	October 7, 2008	Mount Lemmon	Mount Lemmon Survey	·	1.8 km	MPC · JPL
655025	2015 FD_{291}	—	November 24, 2008	Kitt Peak	Spacewatch	EOS	1.6 km	MPC · JPL
655026	2015 FL_{298}	—	March 28, 2015	Haleakala	Pan-STARRS 1	·	2.5 km	MPC · JPL
655027	2015 FN_{298}	—	February 26, 2008	Mount Lemmon	Mount Lemmon Survey	·	580 m	MPC · JPL
655028	2015 FP_{298}	—	March 28, 2015	Haleakala	Pan-STARRS 1	·	1.4 km	MPC · JPL
655029	2015 FT_{301}	—	October 20, 2007	Mount Lemmon	Mount Lemmon Survey	·	2.2 km	MPC · JPL
655030	2015 FG_{302}	—	March 28, 2015	Haleakala	Pan-STARRS 1	·	1.2 km	MPC · JPL
655031	2015 FG_{306}	—	January 25, 2015	Haleakala	Pan-STARRS 1	EUN	940 m	MPC · JPL
655032	2015 FX_{306}	—	November 20, 2008	Kitt Peak	Spacewatch	·	1.8 km	MPC · JPL
655033	2015 FN_{311}	—	January 18, 2009	Kitt Peak	Spacewatch	EOS	1.6 km	MPC · JPL
655034	2015 FF_{314}	—	April 15, 2010	Kitt Peak	Spacewatch	·	2.4 km	MPC · JPL
655035	2015 FE_{316}	—	March 25, 2015	Haleakala	Pan-STARRS 1	·	1.6 km	MPC · JPL
655036	2015 FF_{317}	—	October 21, 2008	Kitt Peak	Spacewatch	BRA	1.0 km	MPC · JPL
655037	2015 FV_{317}	—	March 25, 2015	Haleakala	Pan-STARRS 1	BRA	1.4 km	MPC · JPL
655038	2015 FW_{321}	—	March 25, 2015	Haleakala	Pan-STARRS 1	·	1.9 km	MPC · JPL
655039	2015 FZ_{321}	—	January 24, 2014	Haleakala	Pan-STARRS 1	·	2.5 km	MPC · JPL
655040	2015 FB_{323}	—	August 23, 2003	Palomar	NEAT	GAL	1.6 km	MPC · JPL
655041	2015 FV_{324}	—	November 4, 2007	Mount Lemmon	Mount Lemmon Survey	·	2.2 km	MPC · JPL
655042	2015 FF_{325}	—	March 1, 2009	Kitt Peak	Spacewatch	·	2.4 km	MPC · JPL
655043	2015 FH_{330}	—	June 28, 2011	Mount Lemmon	Mount Lemmon Survey	·	1.9 km	MPC · JPL
655044	2015 FL_{333}	—	June 10, 2004	Campo Imperatore	CINEOS	·	1.2 km	MPC · JPL
655045	2015 FQ_{337}	—	March 30, 2015	Haleakala	Pan-STARRS 1	·	2.6 km	MPC · JPL
655046	2015 FO_{338}	—	October 18, 2012	Haleakala	Pan-STARRS 1	·	1.7 km	MPC · JPL
655047	2015 FP_{339}	—	July 28, 2005	Palomar	NEAT	(58892)	3.0 km	MPC · JPL
655048	2015 FW_{341}	—	September 5, 2011	Bisei	BATTeRS	·	3.2 km	MPC · JPL
655049	2015 FR_{343}	—	April 26, 2011	Mount Lemmon	Mount Lemmon Survey	·	1.3 km	MPC · JPL
655050	2015 FE_{349}	—	March 16, 2015	Haleakala	Pan-STARRS 1	·	2.3 km	MPC · JPL
655051	2015 FK_{350}	—	December 21, 2008	Catalina	CSS	BRA	1.5 km	MPC · JPL
655052	2015 FK_{355}	—	October 29, 2006	Catalina	CSS	·	3.3 km	MPC · JPL
655053	2015 FX_{355}	—	September 19, 2006	Kitt Peak	Spacewatch	·	2.3 km	MPC · JPL
655054	2015 FH_{358}	—	September 27, 2006	Kitt Peak	Spacewatch	·	580 m	MPC · JPL
655055	2015 FR_{358}	—	November 2, 2007	Kitt Peak	Spacewatch	·	1.5 km	MPC · JPL
655056	2015 FM_{359}	—	October 2, 2008	Kitt Peak	Spacewatch	L4	7.6 km	MPC · JPL
655057	2015 FW_{359}	—	October 21, 2012	Haleakala	Pan-STARRS 1	·	2.6 km	MPC · JPL
655058	2015 FS_{360}	—	March 17, 2015	Haleakala	Pan-STARRS 1	RAF	850 m	MPC · JPL
655059	2015 FT_{360}	—	January 13, 2011	Mount Lemmon	Mount Lemmon Survey	·	700 m	MPC · JPL
655060	2015 FH_{361}	—	March 17, 2015	Haleakala	Pan-STARRS 1	L4	7.1 km	MPC · JPL
655061	2015 FL_{364}	—	September 24, 2008	Mount Lemmon	Mount Lemmon Survey	·	1.5 km	MPC · JPL
655062	2015 FX_{368}	—	February 20, 2015	Haleakala	Pan-STARRS 1	BRA	1.3 km	MPC · JPL
655063	2015 FV_{370}	—	May 19, 2005	Mount Lemmon	Mount Lemmon Survey	·	2.9 km	MPC · JPL
655064	2015 FL_{375}	—	November 11, 2004	Kitt Peak	Spacewatch	PAD	1.5 km	MPC · JPL
655065	2015 FL_{379}	—	January 25, 2015	Haleakala	Pan-STARRS 1	GEF	1.1 km	MPC · JPL
655066	2015 FP_{379}	—	January 25, 2015	Haleakala	Pan-STARRS 1	·	1.8 km	MPC · JPL
655067	2015 FX_{379}	—	October 9, 2004	Anderson Mesa	LONEOS	·	1.7 km	MPC · JPL
655068	2015 FT_{380}	—	March 20, 2015	Haleakala	Pan-STARRS 1	·	1.3 km	MPC · JPL
655069	2015 FY_{382}	—	January 23, 2015	Haleakala	Pan-STARRS 1	·	1.8 km	MPC · JPL
655070	2015 FK_{385}	—	September 12, 2007	Mount Lemmon	Mount Lemmon Survey	·	1.9 km	MPC · JPL
655071	2015 FH_{387}	—	November 2, 2007	Kitt Peak	Spacewatch	·	1.5 km	MPC · JPL
655072	2015 FB_{388}	—	December 5, 2007	Kitt Peak	Spacewatch	·	3.0 km	MPC · JPL
655073	2015 FK_{388}	—	November 2, 2007	Mount Lemmon	Mount Lemmon Survey	·	2.6 km	MPC · JPL
655074	2015 FR_{388}	—	October 28, 2010	Mount Lemmon	Mount Lemmon Survey	L4	8.0 km	MPC · JPL
655075	2015 FU_{389}	—	October 20, 2012	Kitt Peak	Spacewatch	·	2.1 km	MPC · JPL
655076	2015 FB_{390}	—	September 2, 1995	Kitt Peak	Spacewatch	·	2.5 km	MPC · JPL
655077	2015 FG_{391}	—	March 20, 2015	Haleakala	Pan-STARRS 1	·	510 m	MPC · JPL
655078	2015 FJ_{391}	—	March 20, 2015	Haleakala	Pan-STARRS 1	·	1.4 km	MPC · JPL
655079	2015 FT_{391}	—	March 20, 2015	Haleakala	Pan-STARRS 1	L4	6.9 km	MPC · JPL
655080	2015 FY_{393}	—	March 21, 2015	Haleakala	Pan-STARRS 1	·	850 m	MPC · JPL
655081	2015 FY_{401}	—	October 20, 2007	Mount Lemmon	Mount Lemmon Survey	·	2.6 km	MPC · JPL
655082	2015 FM_{402}	—	November 12, 2012	Haleakala	Pan-STARRS 1	·	2.3 km	MPC · JPL
655083	2015 FX_{402}	—	November 14, 2012	Mount Lemmon	Mount Lemmon Survey	·	2.6 km	MPC · JPL
655084	2015 FO_{405}	—	March 25, 2015	Haleakala	Pan-STARRS 1	·	540 m	MPC · JPL
655085	2015 FW_{409}	—	March 22, 2015	Haleakala	Pan-STARRS 1	·	2.8 km	MPC · JPL
655086	2015 FQ_{410}	—	February 17, 2004	Kitt Peak	Spacewatch	EOS	1.6 km	MPC · JPL
655087	2015 FS_{410}	—	March 24, 2015	Mount Lemmon	Mount Lemmon Survey	·	1.4 km	MPC · JPL
655088	2015 FR_{414}	—	November 11, 2009	Kitt Peak	Spacewatch	·	830 m	MPC · JPL
655089	2015 FX_{414}	—	October 16, 2006	Catalina	CSS	·	2.3 km	MPC · JPL
655090	2015 FZ_{415}	—	March 16, 2015	Haleakala	Pan-STARRS 1	·	1.9 km	MPC · JPL
655091	2015 FN_{427}	—	March 22, 2015	Haleakala	Pan-STARRS 1	EOS	1.6 km	MPC · JPL
655092	2015 FZ_{429}	—	March 28, 2015	Haleakala	Pan-STARRS 1	·	2.5 km	MPC · JPL
655093	2015 FS_{430}	—	March 22, 2015	Haleakala	Pan-STARRS 1	EOS	1.5 km	MPC · JPL
655094	2015 FT_{431}	—	March 24, 2015	Mount Lemmon	Mount Lemmon Survey	KOR	1.0 km	MPC · JPL
655095	2015 FS_{439}	—	March 21, 2015	Haleakala	Pan-STARRS 1	L4	7.4 km	MPC · JPL
655096	2015 FU_{441}	—	March 29, 2015	Haleakala	Pan-STARRS 1	·	2.5 km	MPC · JPL
655097	2015 FH_{445}	—	March 22, 2015	Haleakala	Pan-STARRS 1	·	2.5 km	MPC · JPL
655098	2015 FR_{445}	—	March 17, 2015	Mount Lemmon	Mount Lemmon Survey	·	1.9 km	MPC · JPL
655099	2015 FJ_{451}	—	March 22, 2015	Haleakala	Pan-STARRS 1	·	3.1 km	MPC · JPL
655100	2015 FC_{456}	—	March 16, 2015	Haleakala	Pan-STARRS 1	·	1.5 km	MPC · JPL

== 655101–655200 ==
back to top

Designation			Discovery			Properties		Ref
Permanent	Provisional	Named after	Date	Site	Discoverer(s)	Category	Diam.	Ref
655101	2015 FJ_{457}	—	October 19, 2006	Kitt Peak	Spacewatch	·	2.6 km	MPC · JPL
655102	2015 FC_{465}	—	November 4, 2007	Kitt Peak	Spacewatch	·	2.1 km	MPC · JPL
655103	2015 GJ_{1}	—	January 19, 2015	ESA OGS	ESA OGS	·	2.2 km	MPC · JPL
655104	2015 GB_{3}	—	August 18, 2009	Kitt Peak	Spacewatch	·	690 m	MPC · JPL
655105	2015 GP_{3}	—	March 27, 2008	Mount Lemmon	Mount Lemmon Survey	·	810 m	MPC · JPL
655106	2015 GA_{4}	—	March 17, 2005	Kitt Peak	Spacewatch	·	490 m	MPC · JPL
655107	2015 GH_{5}	—	October 25, 2005	Mount Lemmon	Mount Lemmon Survey	·	830 m	MPC · JPL
655108	2015 GA_{7}	—	April 10, 2015	Haleakala	Pan-STARRS 1	·	2.0 km	MPC · JPL
655109	2015 GU_{7}	—	January 1, 2014	Haleakala	Pan-STARRS 1	·	2.7 km	MPC · JPL
655110	2015 GZ_{9}	—	January 28, 2015	Haleakala	Pan-STARRS 1	·	1.8 km	MPC · JPL
655111	2015 GS_{15}	—	March 11, 2005	Mount Lemmon	Mount Lemmon Survey	KOR	1.2 km	MPC · JPL
655112	2015 GQ_{16}	—	October 23, 2006	Mount Lemmon	Mount Lemmon Survey	·	2.5 km	MPC · JPL
655113	2015 GT_{16}	—	January 28, 2015	Haleakala	Pan-STARRS 1	·	870 m	MPC · JPL
655114	2015 GD_{17}	—	January 16, 2005	Kitt Peak	Spacewatch	·	1.8 km	MPC · JPL
655115	2015 GL_{19}	—	March 22, 2015	Haleakala	Pan-STARRS 1	EOS	1.6 km	MPC · JPL
655116	2015 GN_{20}	—	September 19, 2003	Kitt Peak	Spacewatch	·	560 m	MPC · JPL
655117	2015 GR_{20}	—	May 20, 2005	Mount Lemmon	Mount Lemmon Survey	·	460 m	MPC · JPL
655118	2015 GH_{21}	—	April 1, 2008	Kitt Peak	Spacewatch	·	890 m	MPC · JPL
655119	2015 GW_{21}	—	April 11, 2015	Mount Lemmon	Mount Lemmon Survey	KOR	1.1 km	MPC · JPL
655120	2015 GC_{26}	—	November 11, 2010	Kitt Peak	Spacewatch	L4	8.8 km	MPC · JPL
655121	2015 GO_{28}	—	January 20, 2015	Haleakala	Pan-STARRS 1	·	1.2 km	MPC · JPL
655122	2015 GD_{30}	—	October 11, 2012	Haleakala	Pan-STARRS 1	·	1.8 km	MPC · JPL
655123	2015 GD_{31}	—	September 16, 2007	Lulin	LUSS	·	2.0 km	MPC · JPL
655124	2015 GH_{31}	—	August 17, 2006	Palomar	NEAT	·	1.8 km	MPC · JPL
655125	2015 GV_{32}	—	March 22, 2015	Haleakala	Pan-STARRS 1	·	1.7 km	MPC · JPL
655126	2015 GH_{35}	—	April 14, 2015	Mount Lemmon	Mount Lemmon Survey	·	1.9 km	MPC · JPL
655127	2015 GW_{37}	—	March 18, 2001	Kitt Peak	Spacewatch	·	2.0 km	MPC · JPL
655128	2015 GE_{38}	—	April 2, 2006	Kitt Peak	Spacewatch	·	1.5 km	MPC · JPL
655129	2015 GL_{42}	—	February 23, 2015	Haleakala	Pan-STARRS 1	·	1.7 km	MPC · JPL
655130	2015 GT_{44}	—	December 4, 2013	Haleakala	Pan-STARRS 1	·	1.3 km	MPC · JPL
655131	2015 GX_{44}	—	May 14, 2005	Kitt Peak	Spacewatch	·	1.5 km	MPC · JPL
655132	2015 GE_{46}	—	April 5, 2011	Siding Spring	SSS	slow	1.6 km	MPC · JPL
655133	2015 GY_{47}	—	November 3, 2007	Kitt Peak	Spacewatch	·	2.2 km	MPC · JPL
655134	2015 GP_{48}	—	October 10, 2013	Haleakala	Pan-STARRS 1	BRA	1.9 km	MPC · JPL
655135	2015 GC_{50}	—	March 27, 2015	Haleakala	Pan-STARRS 1	EOS	1.4 km	MPC · JPL
655136	2015 GM_{62}	—	April 10, 2015	Mount Lemmon	Mount Lemmon Survey	·	1.2 km	MPC · JPL
655137	2015 GS_{63}	—	April 9, 2015	Mount Lemmon	Mount Lemmon Survey	·	1.7 km	MPC · JPL
655138	2015 GU_{63}	—	April 13, 2015	Mount Lemmon	Mount Lemmon Survey	·	1.4 km	MPC · JPL
655139	2015 GD_{65}	—	April 9, 2015	Mount Lemmon	Mount Lemmon Survey	·	1.7 km	MPC · JPL
655140	2015 GH_{67}	—	February 3, 2000	Kitt Peak	Spacewatch	L4	7.4 km	MPC · JPL
655141	2015 GK_{68}	—	April 10, 2015	Mount Lemmon	Mount Lemmon Survey	·	970 m	MPC · JPL
655142	2015 GK_{71}	—	April 11, 2015	Mount Lemmon	Mount Lemmon Survey	·	1.8 km	MPC · JPL
655143	2015 GE_{81}	—	April 13, 2015	Haleakala	Pan-STARRS 1	TEL	1.1 km	MPC · JPL
655144	2015 GH_{81}	—	September 21, 2012	Mount Lemmon	Mount Lemmon Survey	KOR	1.0 km	MPC · JPL
655145	2015 HW_{7}	—	May 27, 2004	Kitt Peak	Spacewatch	·	3.3 km	MPC · JPL
655146	2015 HV_{10}	—	February 16, 2015	Haleakala	Pan-STARRS 1	H	540 m	MPC · JPL
655147	2015 HL_{11}	—	April 12, 2005	Kitt Peak	Spacewatch	·	790 m	MPC · JPL
655148	2015 HX_{11}	—	April 15, 2012	Haleakala	Pan-STARRS 1	·	680 m	MPC · JPL
655149	2015 HO_{13}	—	January 21, 2014	Kitt Peak	Spacewatch	·	2.0 km	MPC · JPL
655150	2015 HY_{14}	—	October 16, 2012	Mount Lemmon	Mount Lemmon Survey	·	1.3 km	MPC · JPL
655151	2015 HH_{15}	—	February 20, 2009	Kitt Peak	Spacewatch	·	2.1 km	MPC · JPL
655152	2015 HS_{15}	—	April 20, 2002	Palomar	NEAT	·	880 m	MPC · JPL
655153	2015 HY_{17}	—	September 25, 2005	Kitt Peak	Spacewatch	·	1.1 km	MPC · JPL
655154	2015 HB_{18}	—	October 6, 2005	Catalina	CSS	ERI	1.3 km	MPC · JPL
655155	2015 HQ_{19}	—	April 9, 2010	Kitt Peak	Spacewatch	EOS	1.4 km	MPC · JPL
655156	2015 HN_{23}	—	April 20, 2015	Haleakala	Pan-STARRS 1	EOS	1.5 km	MPC · JPL
655157	2015 HG_{24}	—	January 31, 2009	Kitt Peak	Spacewatch	·	2.2 km	MPC · JPL
655158	2015 HQ_{24}	—	March 17, 2015	Haleakala	Pan-STARRS 1	·	1.3 km	MPC · JPL
655159	2015 HB_{28}	—	August 28, 2006	Kitt Peak	Spacewatch	·	2.3 km	MPC · JPL
655160	2015 HZ_{28}	—	April 1, 2005	Kitt Peak	Spacewatch	·	660 m	MPC · JPL
655161	2015 HW_{30}	—	May 25, 2006	Mount Lemmon	Mount Lemmon Survey	DOR	1.8 km	MPC · JPL
655162	2015 HP_{35}	—	December 29, 2008	Kitt Peak	Spacewatch	·	1.7 km	MPC · JPL
655163	2015 HZ_{35}	—	March 21, 2015	Haleakala	Pan-STARRS 1	·	780 m	MPC · JPL
655164	2015 HP_{36}	—	December 16, 2007	Kitt Peak	Spacewatch	EOS	1.6 km	MPC · JPL
655165	2015 HQ_{36}	—	May 13, 2007	Kitt Peak	Spacewatch	·	1.1 km	MPC · JPL
655166	2015 HP_{38}	—	February 23, 2015	Haleakala	Pan-STARRS 1	EOS	1.7 km	MPC · JPL
655167	2015 HL_{39}	—	February 20, 2009	Kitt Peak	Spacewatch	EOS	1.8 km	MPC · JPL
655168	2015 HS_{39}	—	January 25, 2009	Kitt Peak	Spacewatch	·	1.9 km	MPC · JPL
655169	2015 HD_{40}	—	February 7, 2003	La Silla	Barbieri, C.	·	2.9 km	MPC · JPL
655170	2015 HV_{45}	—	March 25, 2015	Haleakala	Pan-STARRS 1	·	570 m	MPC · JPL
655171	2015 HY_{47}	—	March 25, 2015	Haleakala	Pan-STARRS 1	·	730 m	MPC · JPL
655172	2015 HB_{48}	—	April 16, 2015	Haleakala	Pan-STARRS 1	V	560 m	MPC · JPL
655173	2015 HR_{49}	—	March 22, 2015	Haleakala	Pan-STARRS 1	·	2.8 km	MPC · JPL
655174	2015 HQ_{53}	—	November 26, 2014	Haleakala	Pan-STARRS 1	·	1.9 km	MPC · JPL
655175	2015 HK_{55}	—	April 27, 2008	Mount Lemmon	Mount Lemmon Survey	(2076)	570 m	MPC · JPL
655176	2015 HR_{55}	—	October 15, 2012	Haleakala	Pan-STARRS 1	·	1.5 km	MPC · JPL
655177	2015 HB_{56}	—	November 6, 2012	Kitt Peak	Spacewatch	·	3.1 km	MPC · JPL
655178	2015 HY_{57}	—	August 26, 2012	Haleakala	Pan-STARRS 1	·	1.1 km	MPC · JPL
655179	2015 HB_{58}	—	November 10, 2006	Kitt Peak	Spacewatch	·	3.9 km	MPC · JPL
655180	2015 HP_{58}	—	April 18, 2015	Haleakala	Pan-STARRS 1	·	550 m	MPC · JPL
655181	2015 HV_{58}	—	September 5, 2011	Haleakala	Pan-STARRS 1	·	2.3 km	MPC · JPL
655182	2015 HE_{61}	—	December 29, 2005	Palomar	NEAT	·	1.5 km	MPC · JPL
655183	2015 HA_{62}	—	April 16, 2005	Kitt Peak	Spacewatch	·	600 m	MPC · JPL
655184	2015 HO_{62}	—	October 22, 2006	Mount Lemmon	Mount Lemmon Survey	·	710 m	MPC · JPL
655185	2015 HD_{65}	—	October 23, 2013	Mount Lemmon	Mount Lemmon Survey	·	510 m	MPC · JPL
655186	2015 HV_{65}	—	March 17, 2015	Haleakala	Pan-STARRS 1	·	390 m	MPC · JPL
655187	2015 HT_{66}	—	April 23, 2015	Haleakala	Pan-STARRS 1	·	470 m	MPC · JPL
655188	2015 HV_{66}	—	September 27, 2006	Kitt Peak	Spacewatch	·	530 m	MPC · JPL
655189	2015 HP_{67}	—	April 23, 2015	Haleakala	Pan-STARRS 1	·	2.5 km	MPC · JPL
655190	2015 HV_{69}	—	April 17, 2015	Mount Lemmon	Mount Lemmon Survey	·	2.5 km	MPC · JPL
655191	2015 HR_{70}	—	March 17, 2015	Haleakala	Pan-STARRS 1	·	2.5 km	MPC · JPL
655192	2015 HD_{71}	—	September 26, 2009	Mount Lemmon	Mount Lemmon Survey	·	630 m	MPC · JPL
655193	2015 HE_{74}	—	June 1, 2008	Mount Lemmon	Mount Lemmon Survey	·	1.3 km	MPC · JPL
655194	2015 HY_{74}	—	April 23, 2015	Haleakala	Pan-STARRS 1	EOS	1.4 km	MPC · JPL
655195	2015 HO_{77}	—	March 4, 2008	Kitt Peak	Spacewatch	·	680 m	MPC · JPL
655196	2015 HR_{79}	—	October 29, 2002	Palomar	NEAT	TIN	910 m	MPC · JPL
655197	2015 HD_{83}	—	November 1, 2000	Socorro	LINEAR	·	1.8 km	MPC · JPL
655198	2015 HP_{86}	—	March 5, 2008	Mount Lemmon	Mount Lemmon Survey	·	700 m	MPC · JPL
655199	2015 HW_{86}	—	March 17, 2015	Haleakala	Pan-STARRS 1	·	1.5 km	MPC · JPL
655200	2015 HY_{88}	—	April 23, 2015	Haleakala	Pan-STARRS 1	·	560 m	MPC · JPL

== 655201–655300 ==
back to top

Designation			Discovery			Properties		Ref
Permanent	Provisional	Named after	Date	Site	Discoverer(s)	Category	Diam.	Ref
655201	2015 HM_{89}	—	April 14, 2005	Kitt Peak	Spacewatch	·	540 m	MPC · JPL
655202	2015 HA_{90}	—	November 1, 2006	Kitt Peak	Spacewatch	EOS	1.6 km	MPC · JPL
655203	2015 HC_{90}	—	April 10, 2015	Mount Lemmon	Mount Lemmon Survey	·	570 m	MPC · JPL
655204	2015 HE_{90}	—	April 11, 2015	Kitt Peak	Spacewatch	·	1.5 km	MPC · JPL
655205	2015 HW_{90}	—	October 18, 2012	Haleakala	Pan-STARRS 1	·	1.3 km	MPC · JPL
655206	2015 HN_{91}	—	April 11, 2008	Kitt Peak	Spacewatch	·	610 m	MPC · JPL
655207	2015 HU_{91}	—	October 5, 2013	Mount Lemmon	Mount Lemmon Survey	·	1.0 km	MPC · JPL
655208	2015 HX_{91}	—	February 21, 2009	Kitt Peak	Spacewatch	·	2.1 km	MPC · JPL
655209	2015 HF_{92}	—	November 2, 2007	Kitt Peak	Spacewatch	·	1.7 km	MPC · JPL
655210	2015 HG_{92}	—	October 1, 2005	Mount Lemmon	Mount Lemmon Survey	·	770 m	MPC · JPL
655211	2015 HF_{93}	—	November 7, 2007	Mount Lemmon	Mount Lemmon Survey	·	2.0 km	MPC · JPL
655212	2015 HL_{93}	—	October 7, 2012	Haleakala	Pan-STARRS 1	NYS	1.1 km	MPC · JPL
655213	2015 HY_{93}	—	April 23, 2015	Haleakala	Pan-STARRS 1	·	1.8 km	MPC · JPL
655214	2015 HG_{94}	—	March 4, 2008	Mount Lemmon	Mount Lemmon Survey	·	560 m	MPC · JPL
655215	2015 HS_{94}	—	July 21, 2006	Mount Lemmon	Mount Lemmon Survey	·	720 m	MPC · JPL
655216	2015 HZ_{94}	—	December 6, 2012	Mount Lemmon	Mount Lemmon Survey	EOS	2.1 km	MPC · JPL
655217	2015 HP_{97}	—	October 11, 1977	Palomar	C. J. van Houten, I. van Houten-Groeneveld, T. Gehrels	·	820 m	MPC · JPL
655218	2015 HS_{97}	—	November 6, 2012	Kitt Peak	Spacewatch	·	2.0 km	MPC · JPL
655219	2015 HM_{99}	—	April 23, 2015	Haleakala	Pan-STARRS 1	(5)	1.3 km	MPC · JPL
655220	2015 HH_{101}	—	September 23, 2011	Kitt Peak	Spacewatch	TIR	2.2 km	MPC · JPL
655221	2015 HJ_{103}	—	March 22, 2015	Haleakala	Pan-STARRS 1	·	2.8 km	MPC · JPL
655222	2015 HZ_{104}	—	January 28, 2014	Mount Lemmon	Mount Lemmon Survey	·	2.6 km	MPC · JPL
655223	2015 HE_{105}	—	January 28, 2015	Haleakala	Pan-STARRS 1	EOS	1.4 km	MPC · JPL
655224	2015 HL_{106}	—	April 23, 2015	Haleakala	Pan-STARRS 1	·	1.8 km	MPC · JPL
655225	2015 HF_{107}	—	January 28, 2015	Haleakala	Pan-STARRS 1	BRA	1.4 km	MPC · JPL
655226	2015 HZ_{108}	—	January 12, 2002	Kitt Peak	Spacewatch	·	2.8 km	MPC · JPL
655227	2015 HE_{111}	—	February 17, 2015	Haleakala	Pan-STARRS 1	·	2.6 km	MPC · JPL
655228	2015 HS_{112}	—	October 6, 2012	Haleakala	Pan-STARRS 1	·	1.0 km	MPC · JPL
655229	2015 HU_{113}	—	April 13, 2015	Haleakala	Pan-STARRS 1	·	2.2 km	MPC · JPL
655230	2015 HH_{114}	—	December 9, 2012	Haleakala	Pan-STARRS 1	EOS	1.9 km	MPC · JPL
655231	2015 HD_{116}	—	March 25, 2015	Haleakala	Pan-STARRS 1	·	2.0 km	MPC · JPL
655232	2015 HH_{118}	—	September 28, 2011	Mount Lemmon	Mount Lemmon Survey	THM	1.9 km	MPC · JPL
655233	2015 HW_{118}	—	March 17, 2015	Haleakala	Pan-STARRS 1	·	1.8 km	MPC · JPL
655234	2015 HT_{130}	—	September 1, 2005	Palomar	NEAT	·	940 m	MPC · JPL
655235	2015 HM_{131}	—	August 28, 2005	Kitt Peak	Spacewatch	·	690 m	MPC · JPL
655236	2015 HZ_{132}	—	April 23, 2015	Haleakala	Pan-STARRS 1	EOS	1.3 km	MPC · JPL
655237	2015 HA_{135}	—	December 9, 2012	Mount Lemmon	Mount Lemmon Survey	·	1.4 km	MPC · JPL
655238	2015 HJ_{135}	—	February 22, 2009	Kitt Peak	Spacewatch	·	1.9 km	MPC · JPL
655239	2015 HC_{143}	—	February 25, 2011	Mount Lemmon	Mount Lemmon Survey	·	510 m	MPC · JPL
655240	2015 HQ_{145}	—	October 11, 2007	Kitt Peak	Spacewatch	·	1.9 km	MPC · JPL
655241	2015 HW_{145}	—	December 31, 2013	Haleakala	Pan-STARRS 1	·	2.1 km	MPC · JPL
655242	2015 HX_{146}	—	March 17, 2015	Haleakala	Pan-STARRS 1	·	2.6 km	MPC · JPL
655243	2015 HP_{148}	—	February 23, 2007	Catalina	CSS	·	1.6 km	MPC · JPL
655244	2015 HV_{149}	—	April 23, 2015	Haleakala	Pan-STARRS 1	·	2.4 km	MPC · JPL
655245	2015 HE_{151}	—	April 23, 2015	Haleakala	Pan-STARRS 1	·	1.6 km	MPC · JPL
655246	2015 HT_{152}	—	March 28, 2008	Kitt Peak	Spacewatch	·	570 m	MPC · JPL
655247	2015 HQ_{154}	—	December 31, 2007	Kitt Peak	Spacewatch	·	650 m	MPC · JPL
655248	2015 HW_{155}	—	May 8, 2011	Mayhill-ISON	L. Elenin	·	1.5 km	MPC · JPL
655249	2015 HX_{158}	—	April 17, 2015	Mount Lemmon	Mount Lemmon Survey	·	2.0 km	MPC · JPL
655250	2015 HF_{159}	—	October 18, 2012	Haleakala	Pan-STARRS 1	EOS	1.5 km	MPC · JPL
655251	2015 HL_{162}	—	April 24, 2015	Haleakala	Pan-STARRS 1	EOS	1.5 km	MPC · JPL
655252	2015 HL_{163}	—	May 9, 2010	Mount Lemmon	Mount Lemmon Survey	·	1.2 km	MPC · JPL
655253	2015 HS_{164}	—	September 25, 2006	Mount Lemmon	Mount Lemmon Survey	·	2.1 km	MPC · JPL
655254	2015 HG_{165}	—	April 12, 2010	WISE	WISE	·	1.2 km	MPC · JPL
655255	2015 HZ_{165}	—	January 28, 2014	Mount Lemmon	Mount Lemmon Survey	·	2.2 km	MPC · JPL
655256	2015 HW_{166}	—	September 26, 2012	Mount Lemmon	Mount Lemmon Survey	·	1.1 km	MPC · JPL
655257	2015 HS_{168}	—	March 1, 2009	Kitt Peak	Spacewatch	THM	2.0 km	MPC · JPL
655258	2015 HT_{168}	—	April 11, 2015	Kitt Peak	Spacewatch	EOS	1.5 km	MPC · JPL
655259	2015 HC_{172}	—	February 8, 2002	Kitt Peak	Spacewatch	L4	6.7 km	MPC · JPL
655260	2015 HW_{174}	—	February 6, 2002	Kitt Peak	Deep Ecliptic Survey	·	740 m	MPC · JPL
655261	2015 HV_{175}	—	October 23, 2003	Kitt Peak	Spacewatch	·	2.4 km	MPC · JPL
655262	2015 HY_{177}	—	September 28, 2003	Kitt Peak	Spacewatch	·	1.3 km	MPC · JPL
655263	2015 HG_{178}	—	January 25, 2015	Haleakala	Pan-STARRS 1	·	570 m	MPC · JPL
655264	2015 HR_{179}	—	January 28, 2015	Haleakala	Pan-STARRS 1	·	2.9 km	MPC · JPL
655265	2015 HQ_{180}	—	May 13, 2005	Mount Lemmon	Mount Lemmon Survey	EOS	2.1 km	MPC · JPL
655266	2015 HT_{181}	—	April 6, 2008	Mount Lemmon	Mount Lemmon Survey	·	790 m	MPC · JPL
655267	2015 HP_{186}	—	November 1, 2007	Catalina	CSS	526	2.7 km	MPC · JPL
655268	2015 HW_{186}	—	September 4, 2011	Haleakala	Pan-STARRS 1	VER	2.3 km	MPC · JPL
655269	2015 HT_{188}	—	April 18, 2015	Haleakala	Pan-STARRS 1	·	2.4 km	MPC · JPL
655270	2015 HB_{190}	—	January 20, 2009	Kitt Peak	Spacewatch	·	1.3 km	MPC · JPL
655271	2015 HG_{191}	—	April 2, 2009	Kitt Peak	Spacewatch	EOS	1.6 km	MPC · JPL
655272	2015 HM_{192}	—	December 29, 2003	Kitt Peak	Spacewatch	·	750 m	MPC · JPL
655273	2015 HU_{193}	—	November 13, 2012	Tenerife	ESA OGS	·	2.7 km	MPC · JPL
655274	2015 HT_{196}	—	April 23, 2015	Haleakala	Pan-STARRS 1	·	900 m	MPC · JPL
655275	2015 HF_{202}	—	April 23, 2015	Haleakala	Pan-STARRS 1	·	2.6 km	MPC · JPL
655276	2015 HF_{204}	—	April 25, 2015	Haleakala	Pan-STARRS 1	·	2.4 km	MPC · JPL
655277	2015 HJ_{208}	—	April 25, 2015	Haleakala	Pan-STARRS 1	·	1.3 km	MPC · JPL
655278	2015 HM_{209}	—	April 18, 2015	Haleakala	Pan-STARRS 1	·	1.5 km	MPC · JPL
655279	2015 HM_{210}	—	April 23, 2015	Haleakala	Pan-STARRS 1	·	1.6 km	MPC · JPL
655280	2015 HD_{217}	—	April 23, 2015	Haleakala	Pan-STARRS 1	·	2.2 km	MPC · JPL
655281	2015 HF_{217}	—	April 23, 2015	Haleakala	Pan-STARRS 1	·	2.3 km	MPC · JPL
655282	2015 HS_{217}	—	April 23, 2015	Haleakala	Pan-STARRS 1	·	1.9 km	MPC · JPL
655283	2015 HM_{218}	—	April 20, 2015	Haleakala	Pan-STARRS 1	L4	7.0 km	MPC · JPL
655284	2015 HQ_{219}	—	April 25, 2015	Haleakala	Pan-STARRS 1	THM	1.7 km	MPC · JPL
655285	2015 HX_{221}	—	April 25, 2015	Haleakala	Pan-STARRS 1	VER	2.0 km	MPC · JPL
655286	2015 HZ_{221}	—	April 23, 2015	Haleakala	Pan-STARRS 1	·	2.1 km	MPC · JPL
655287	2015 HN_{222}	—	April 20, 2015	Haleakala	Pan-STARRS 1	·	500 m	MPC · JPL
655288	2015 HL_{224}	—	April 23, 2015	Haleakala	Pan-STARRS 1	KOR	1.1 km	MPC · JPL
655289	2015 HG_{242}	—	April 18, 2015	Cerro Tololo-DECam	DECam	·	2.2 km	MPC · JPL
655290	2015 HU_{247}	—	April 19, 2015	Cerro Tololo-DECam	DECam	L4	5.4 km	MPC · JPL
655291	2015 HE_{257}	—	April 18, 2015	Cerro Tololo-DECam	DECam	·	1.9 km	MPC · JPL
655292	2015 HB_{262}	—	April 18, 2015	Cerro Tololo-DECam	DECam	·	2.1 km	MPC · JPL
655293	2015 HY_{265}	—	April 19, 2015	Cerro Tololo-DECam	DECam	·	1.5 km	MPC · JPL
655294	2015 HM_{273}	—	April 18, 2015	Cerro Tololo-DECam	DECam	·	1.4 km	MPC · JPL
655295	2015 HH_{287}	—	April 19, 2015	Cerro Tololo-DECam	DECam	·	2.2 km	MPC · JPL
655296	2015 HT_{287}	—	April 18, 2015	Cerro Tololo-DECam	DECam	·	1.8 km	MPC · JPL
655297	2015 HX_{290}	—	May 18, 2015	Haleakala	Pan-STARRS 1	VER	2.2 km	MPC · JPL
655298	2015 HA_{291}	—	April 18, 2015	Cerro Tololo-DECam	DECam	·	2.5 km	MPC · JPL
655299	2015 HY_{292}	—	April 23, 2015	Haleakala	Pan-STARRS 1	·	2.0 km	MPC · JPL
655300	2015 HH_{338}	—	September 19, 2006	Kitt Peak	Spacewatch	·	1.7 km	MPC · JPL

== 655301–655400 ==
back to top

Designation			Discovery			Properties		Ref
Permanent	Provisional	Named after	Date	Site	Discoverer(s)	Category	Diam.	Ref
655301	2015 HD_{350}	—	April 17, 2015	Mount Lemmon	Mount Lemmon Survey	·	2.2 km	MPC · JPL
655302	2015 HO_{352}	—	April 18, 2015	Cerro Tololo-DECam	DECam	·	1.4 km	MPC · JPL
655303	2015 HC_{355}	—	April 18, 2015	Cerro Tololo-DECam	DECam	L4	6.8 km	MPC · JPL
655304	2015 JN	—	September 11, 2005	Socorro	LINEAR	·	740 m	MPC · JPL
655305	2015 JD_{4}	—	April 24, 2015	Haleakala	Pan-STARRS 1	·	700 m	MPC · JPL
655306	2015 JN_{4}	—	April 24, 2015	Haleakala	Pan-STARRS 1	·	1.7 km	MPC · JPL
655307	2015 JE_{5}	—	May 15, 2015	Haleakala	Pan-STARRS 1	(5651)	2.4 km	MPC · JPL
655308	2015 JJ_{5}	—	March 22, 2015	Haleakala	Pan-STARRS 1	·	2.8 km	MPC · JPL
655309	2015 JN_{5}	—	March 22, 2015	Haleakala	Pan-STARRS 1	·	2.9 km	MPC · JPL
655310	2015 JO_{6}	—	October 23, 2012	Haleakala	Pan-STARRS 1	·	3.1 km	MPC · JPL
655311	2015 JE_{8}	—	October 23, 2012	Nogales	M. Schwartz, P. R. Holvorcem	·	3.2 km	MPC · JPL
655312	2015 JB_{10}	—	March 23, 2004	Kitt Peak	Spacewatch	·	1.5 km	MPC · JPL
655313	2015 JN_{10}	—	April 3, 2008	Mount Lemmon	Mount Lemmon Survey	·	820 m	MPC · JPL
655314	2015 JY_{12}	—	May 12, 2015	Mount Lemmon	Mount Lemmon Survey	THM	1.8 km	MPC · JPL
655315	2015 JK_{15}	—	May 14, 2015	Haleakala	Pan-STARRS 1	·	2.9 km	MPC · JPL
655316	2015 JJ_{21}	—	May 11, 2015	Mount Lemmon	Mount Lemmon Survey	L4	9.1 km	MPC · JPL
655317	2015 JK_{21}	—	May 11, 2015	Mount Lemmon	Mount Lemmon Survey	·	2.4 km	MPC · JPL
655318	2015 JU_{26}	—	May 15, 2015	Haleakala	Pan-STARRS 1	EOS	1.7 km	MPC · JPL
655319	2015 KC	—	January 31, 2004	Catalina	CSS	H	660 m	MPC · JPL
655320	2015 KB_{2}	—	May 17, 2015	Haleakala	Pan-STARRS 1	·	2.9 km	MPC · JPL
655321	2015 KG_{6}	—	August 23, 2003	Palomar	NEAT	·	1.4 km	MPC · JPL
655322	2015 KS_{6}	—	September 25, 2011	Haleakala	Pan-STARRS 1	VER	2.0 km	MPC · JPL
655323	2015 KL_{10}	—	December 21, 2006	Mount Lemmon	Mount Lemmon Survey	·	1.2 km	MPC · JPL
655324	2015 KR_{10}	—	April 19, 2015	Kitt Peak	Spacewatch	LUT	4.0 km	MPC · JPL
655325	2015 KB_{11}	—	December 1, 2008	Catalina	CSS	(194)	2.0 km	MPC · JPL
655326	2015 KA_{14}	—	December 6, 2007	Kitt Peak	Spacewatch	TIR	2.6 km	MPC · JPL
655327	2015 KB_{15}	—	May 18, 2015	Haleakala	Pan-STARRS 1	·	530 m	MPC · JPL
655328	2015 KL_{20}	—	March 5, 2011	Mount Lemmon	Mount Lemmon Survey	·	820 m	MPC · JPL
655329	2015 KZ_{22}	—	April 13, 2011	Haleakala	Pan-STARRS 1	·	1.3 km	MPC · JPL
655330	2015 KO_{23}	—	November 23, 2006	Mount Lemmon	Mount Lemmon Survey	·	2.2 km	MPC · JPL
655331	2015 KP_{23}	—	March 14, 2011	Mount Lemmon	Mount Lemmon Survey	V	520 m	MPC · JPL
655332	2015 KB_{24}	—	February 2, 2008	Mount Lemmon	Mount Lemmon Survey	THM	2.0 km	MPC · JPL
655333	2015 KE_{25}	—	January 1, 2014	Haleakala	Pan-STARRS 1	·	2.2 km	MPC · JPL
655334	2015 KZ_{25}	—	October 26, 2009	Mount Lemmon	Mount Lemmon Survey	·	670 m	MPC · JPL
655335	2015 KA_{26}	—	August 21, 2008	Kitt Peak	Spacewatch	·	940 m	MPC · JPL
655336	2015 KG_{26}	—	May 19, 2015	Mount Lemmon	Mount Lemmon Survey	·	2.3 km	MPC · JPL
655337	2015 KL_{26}	—	September 25, 2012	Mount Lemmon	Mount Lemmon Survey	PHO	800 m	MPC · JPL
655338	2015 KL_{27}	—	April 23, 2015	Haleakala	Pan-STARRS 1	·	2.8 km	MPC · JPL
655339	2015 KJ_{28}	—	April 18, 2015	Haleakala	Pan-STARRS 1	EOS	1.6 km	MPC · JPL
655340	2015 KU_{29}	—	October 3, 2013	Kitt Peak	Spacewatch	·	660 m	MPC · JPL
655341	2015 KB_{30}	—	July 30, 2005	Palomar	NEAT	·	630 m	MPC · JPL
655342	2015 KW_{35}	—	November 22, 2012	Catalina	CSS	·	1.5 km	MPC · JPL
655343	2015 KG_{37}	—	July 24, 2003	Palomar	NEAT	MAR	1.3 km	MPC · JPL
655344	2015 KM_{38}	—	May 20, 2015	Mount Lemmon	Mount Lemmon Survey	PHO	630 m	MPC · JPL
655345	2015 KN_{40}	—	November 9, 2013	Haleakala	Pan-STARRS 1	·	620 m	MPC · JPL
655346	2015 KU_{40}	—	February 26, 2014	Mount Lemmon	Mount Lemmon Survey	·	2.4 km	MPC · JPL
655347	2015 KH_{41}	—	May 20, 2015	Haleakala	Pan-STARRS 1	KOR	1.3 km	MPC · JPL
655348	2015 KM_{41}	—	May 20, 2015	Haleakala	Pan-STARRS 1	·	2.3 km	MPC · JPL
655349	2015 KH_{42}	—	October 23, 2009	Mount Lemmon	Mount Lemmon Survey	V	480 m	MPC · JPL
655350	2015 KQ_{42}	—	May 20, 2015	Haleakala	Pan-STARRS 1	·	2.7 km	MPC · JPL
655351	2015 KS_{42}	—	September 14, 2005	Catalina	CSS	·	1.1 km	MPC · JPL
655352	2015 KC_{43}	—	May 20, 2015	Haleakala	Pan-STARRS 1	·	530 m	MPC · JPL
655353	2015 KK_{44}	—	October 20, 2006	Mount Lemmon	Mount Lemmon Survey	·	3.1 km	MPC · JPL
655354	2015 KB_{45}	—	October 20, 2007	Mount Lemmon	Mount Lemmon Survey	(16286)	1.8 km	MPC · JPL
655355	2015 KX_{47}	—	May 20, 2015	Haleakala	Pan-STARRS 1	·	1.9 km	MPC · JPL
655356	2015 KZ_{50}	—	February 19, 2014	Mount Lemmon	Mount Lemmon Survey	EOS	1.6 km	MPC · JPL
655357	2015 KD_{51}	—	May 15, 2015	Haleakala	Pan-STARRS 1	·	3.0 km	MPC · JPL
655358	2015 KX_{53}	—	April 15, 2008	Mount Lemmon	Mount Lemmon Survey	·	730 m	MPC · JPL
655359	2015 KX_{57}	—	March 17, 2015	Haleakala	Pan-STARRS 1	·	880 m	MPC · JPL
655360	2015 KG_{58}	—	April 11, 2008	Kitt Peak	Spacewatch	·	660 m	MPC · JPL
655361	2015 KS_{59}	—	June 27, 2011	Mount Lemmon	Mount Lemmon Survey	·	1.4 km	MPC · JPL
655362	2015 KO_{60}	—	April 23, 2015	Haleakala	Pan-STARRS 1	·	2.2 km	MPC · JPL
655363	2015 KK_{61}	—	December 8, 2012	Mayhill-ISON	L. Elenin	(18466)	2.0 km	MPC · JPL
655364	2015 KU_{62}	—	March 28, 2015	Haleakala	Pan-STARRS 1	·	2.4 km	MPC · JPL
655365	2015 KE_{64}	—	August 25, 2003	Cerro Tololo	Deep Ecliptic Survey	·	1.6 km	MPC · JPL
655366	2015 KQ_{64}	—	September 18, 2009	Kitt Peak	Spacewatch	·	610 m	MPC · JPL
655367	2015 KE_{65}	—	December 11, 2012	Mount Lemmon	Mount Lemmon Survey	EOS	1.7 km	MPC · JPL
655368	2015 KY_{65}	—	November 9, 2007	Catalina	CSS	·	1.8 km	MPC · JPL
655369	2015 KQ_{68}	—	April 19, 2015	Kitt Peak	Spacewatch	V	450 m	MPC · JPL
655370	2015 KJ_{71}	—	May 21, 2015	Haleakala	Pan-STARRS 1	·	2.4 km	MPC · JPL
655371	2015 KW_{72}	—	May 21, 2015	Haleakala	Pan-STARRS 1	·	1.6 km	MPC · JPL
655372	2015 KO_{73}	—	December 5, 2007	Kitt Peak	Spacewatch	·	2.4 km	MPC · JPL
655373	2015 KC_{77}	—	July 7, 2005	Kitt Peak	Spacewatch	·	2.5 km	MPC · JPL
655374	2015 KX_{78}	—	September 25, 2011	Haleakala	Pan-STARRS 1	VER	2.5 km	MPC · JPL
655375	2015 KL_{79}	—	September 25, 2011	Haleakala	Pan-STARRS 1	·	2.4 km	MPC · JPL
655376	2015 KM_{80}	—	January 15, 2008	Mount Lemmon	Mount Lemmon Survey	·	2.9 km	MPC · JPL
655377	2015 KR_{80}	—	May 21, 2015	Haleakala	Pan-STARRS 1	·	2.7 km	MPC · JPL
655378	2015 KY_{81}	—	May 19, 2015	Haleakala	Pan-STARRS 1	EOS	1.6 km	MPC · JPL
655379	2015 KE_{82}	—	May 21, 2015	Haleakala	Pan-STARRS 1	MAR	860 m	MPC · JPL
655380	2015 KG_{86}	—	December 4, 2013	Piszkés-tető	K. Sárneczky, P. Székely	·	3.1 km	MPC · JPL
655381	2015 KD_{88}	—	January 10, 2008	Kitt Peak	Spacewatch	·	2.6 km	MPC · JPL
655382	2015 KJ_{90}	—	April 28, 2008	Mount Lemmon	Mount Lemmon Survey	·	700 m	MPC · JPL
655383	2015 KM_{90}	—	May 21, 2015	Haleakala	Pan-STARRS 1	·	2.0 km	MPC · JPL
655384	2015 KG_{92}	—	April 23, 2015	Haleakala	Pan-STARRS 1	·	720 m	MPC · JPL
655385	2015 KE_{95}	—	October 22, 2011	Mount Lemmon	Mount Lemmon Survey	·	2.2 km	MPC · JPL
655386	2015 KX_{96}	—	September 26, 2012	Mount Lemmon	Mount Lemmon Survey	·	770 m	MPC · JPL
655387	2015 KZ_{97}	—	April 5, 2008	Mount Lemmon	Mount Lemmon Survey	·	690 m	MPC · JPL
655388	2015 KC_{103}	—	May 21, 2015	Haleakala	Pan-STARRS 1	·	480 m	MPC · JPL
655389	2015 KC_{104}	—	September 26, 2011	ESA OGS	ESA OGS	·	2.4 km	MPC · JPL
655390	2015 KP_{105}	—	February 16, 2004	Kitt Peak	Spacewatch	·	2.6 km	MPC · JPL
655391	2015 KK_{106}	—	October 14, 2009	Mount Lemmon	Mount Lemmon Survey	·	690 m	MPC · JPL
655392	2015 KA_{112}	—	November 13, 2006	Catalina	CSS	EUP	3.3 km	MPC · JPL
655393	2015 KN_{113}	—	April 5, 2000	Socorro	LINEAR	·	1.7 km	MPC · JPL
655394	2015 KK_{117}	—	May 21, 2015	Haleakala	Pan-STARRS 1	·	1.5 km	MPC · JPL
655395	2015 KQ_{122}	—	May 28, 2008	Mount Lemmon	Mount Lemmon Survey	·	730 m	MPC · JPL
655396	2015 KS_{123}	—	May 13, 2015	Haleakala	Pan-STARRS 1	PHO	710 m	MPC · JPL
655397	2015 KY_{124}	—	May 7, 2015	Mount Lemmon	Mount Lemmon Survey	·	500 m	MPC · JPL
655398	2015 KD_{128}	—	January 4, 2013	Mount Lemmon	Mount Lemmon Survey	·	3.0 km	MPC · JPL
655399	2015 KR_{131}	—	April 3, 2011	Haleakala	Pan-STARRS 1	·	770 m	MPC · JPL
655400	2015 KP_{134}	—	February 28, 2014	Haleakala	Pan-STARRS 1	·	2.0 km	MPC · JPL

== 655401–655500 ==
back to top

Designation			Discovery			Properties		Ref
Permanent	Provisional	Named after	Date	Site	Discoverer(s)	Category	Diam.	Ref
655401	2015 KQ_{141}	—	October 25, 2011	Mount Lemmon	Mount Lemmon Survey	·	2.3 km	MPC · JPL
655402	2015 KV_{142}	—	May 20, 2015	Mount Lemmon	Mount Lemmon Survey	·	550 m	MPC · JPL
655403	2015 KU_{144}	—	January 13, 2008	Kitt Peak	Spacewatch	·	2.2 km	MPC · JPL
655404	2015 KS_{145}	—	April 6, 2008	Kitt Peak	Spacewatch	·	600 m	MPC · JPL
655405	2015 KD_{149}	—	August 3, 2008	Siding Spring	SSS	·	950 m	MPC · JPL
655406	2015 KF_{150}	—	November 15, 2006	Mount Lemmon	Mount Lemmon Survey	·	2.5 km	MPC · JPL
655407	2015 KK_{150}	—	June 17, 2010	Mount Lemmon	Mount Lemmon Survey	EOS	2.1 km	MPC · JPL
655408	2015 KG_{151}	—	June 17, 2012	Mount Lemmon	Mount Lemmon Survey	·	810 m	MPC · JPL
655409	2015 KB_{152}	—	March 31, 2008	Kitt Peak	Spacewatch	·	620 m	MPC · JPL
655410	2015 KO_{153}	—	January 15, 2008	Mount Lemmon	Mount Lemmon Survey	·	3.5 km	MPC · JPL
655411	2015 KY_{156}	—	December 17, 2001	Socorro	LINEAR	H	440 m	MPC · JPL
655412	2015 KQ_{159}	—	March 13, 2008	Mount Lemmon	Mount Lemmon Survey	PHO	930 m	MPC · JPL
655413	2015 KZ_{160}	—	May 25, 2015	Haleakala	Pan-STARRS 1	·	1.9 km	MPC · JPL
655414	2015 KW_{165}	—	October 23, 2006	Mount Lemmon	Mount Lemmon Survey	·	2.3 km	MPC · JPL
655415	2015 KU_{166}	—	July 29, 2002	Palomar	NEAT	·	1.3 km	MPC · JPL
655416	2015 KB_{181}	—	August 26, 2000	Cerro Tololo	Deep Ecliptic Survey	·	1.5 km	MPC · JPL
655417	2015 KF_{187}	—	May 21, 2015	Haleakala	Pan-STARRS 1	EOS	1.4 km	MPC · JPL
655418	2015 KO_{187}	—	May 25, 2015	Haleakala	Pan-STARRS 1	·	1.4 km	MPC · JPL
655419	2015 KN_{189}	—	May 21, 2015	Haleakala	Pan-STARRS 1	·	1.7 km	MPC · JPL
655420	2015 KX_{191}	—	May 22, 2015	Haleakala	Pan-STARRS 1	·	2.2 km	MPC · JPL
655421	2015 KN_{192}	—	May 16, 2015	Cerro Paranal	Altmann, M., Prusti, T.	·	500 m	MPC · JPL
655422	2015 KP_{192}	—	May 23, 2015	Kitt Peak	Spacewatch	T_{j} (2.99) · EUP	3.0 km	MPC · JPL
655423	2015 KW_{202}	—	May 26, 2015	Haleakala	Pan-STARRS 1	·	2.3 km	MPC · JPL
655424	2015 KB_{204}	—	May 24, 2015	Mount Lemmon	Mount Lemmon Survey	·	2.7 km	MPC · JPL
655425	2015 KG_{220}	—	November 19, 2007	Mount Lemmon	Mount Lemmon Survey	(8737)	2.6 km	MPC · JPL
655426	2015 KB_{235}	—	May 20, 2015	Cerro Tololo	DECam	·	800 m	MPC · JPL
655427	2015 KM_{236}	—	January 28, 2015	Haleakala	Pan-STARRS 1	EOS	1.3 km	MPC · JPL
655428	2015 KR_{243}	—	May 24, 2015	Haleakala	Pan-STARRS 1	·	2.3 km	MPC · JPL
655429	2015 KJ_{250}	—	November 9, 2013	Haleakala	Pan-STARRS 1	·	490 m	MPC · JPL
655430	2015 KP_{321}	—	May 18, 2015	Haleakala	Pan-STARRS 1	VER	2.1 km	MPC · JPL
655431	2015 KZ_{322}	—	May 18, 2015	Mount Lemmon	Mount Lemmon Survey	VER	2.1 km	MPC · JPL
655432	2015 KP_{325}	—	May 21, 2015	Cerro Tololo	DECam	LIX	2.3 km	MPC · JPL
655433	2015 LV_{2}	—	October 20, 2012	Haleakala	Pan-STARRS 1	EOS	2.0 km	MPC · JPL
655434	2015 LJ_{4}	—	May 1, 2003	Kitt Peak	Spacewatch	T_{j} (2.93)	3.6 km	MPC · JPL
655435	2015 LQ_{7}	—	May 14, 2015	Haleakala	Pan-STARRS 1	·	2.9 km	MPC · JPL
655436	2015 LU_{9}	—	August 21, 2008	Kitt Peak	Spacewatch	·	860 m	MPC · JPL
655437	2015 LQ_{10}	—	August 29, 2009	Kitt Peak	Spacewatch	·	610 m	MPC · JPL
655438	2015 LL_{13}	—	April 20, 2004	Kitt Peak	Spacewatch	·	2.9 km	MPC · JPL
655439	2015 LN_{14}	—	July 29, 2008	Kitt Peak	Spacewatch	MAS	560 m	MPC · JPL
655440	2015 LK_{15}	—	June 11, 2015	Haleakala	Pan-STARRS 1	·	2.4 km	MPC · JPL
655441	2015 LX_{15}	—	May 26, 2008	Kitt Peak	Spacewatch	·	690 m	MPC · JPL
655442	2015 LX_{16}	—	October 23, 2006	Mount Lemmon	Mount Lemmon Survey	·	3.7 km	MPC · JPL
655443	2015 LZ_{16}	—	June 11, 2015	Haleakala	Pan-STARRS 1	·	710 m	MPC · JPL
655444	2015 LU_{17}	—	August 9, 2008	La Sagra	OAM	·	750 m	MPC · JPL
655445	2015 LR_{22}	—	April 5, 2011	Kitt Peak	Spacewatch	·	1 km	MPC · JPL
655446	2015 LJ_{26}	—	February 8, 2011	Mount Lemmon	Mount Lemmon Survey	·	590 m	MPC · JPL
655447	2015 LP_{28}	—	January 26, 2015	Haleakala	Pan-STARRS 1	·	1.2 km	MPC · JPL
655448	2015 LF_{29}	—	November 6, 2005	Mount Lemmon	Mount Lemmon Survey	THM	1.8 km	MPC · JPL
655449	2015 LW_{37}	—	May 25, 2015	Mount Lemmon	Mount Lemmon Survey	·	2.4 km	MPC · JPL
655450	2015 LA_{39}	—	March 30, 2015	Haleakala	Pan-STARRS 1	·	1.1 km	MPC · JPL
655451	2015 LO_{49}	—	August 3, 2016	Haleakala	Pan-STARRS 1	·	2.0 km	MPC · JPL
655452	2015 LA_{52}	—	June 15, 2015	Haleakala	Pan-STARRS 1	VER	2.1 km	MPC · JPL
655453	2015 LE_{53}	—	November 26, 2011	Mount Lemmon	Mount Lemmon Survey	·	2.2 km	MPC · JPL
655454	2015 LU_{62}	—	June 11, 2015	Haleakala	Pan-STARRS 1	·	2.4 km	MPC · JPL
655455	2015 MK_{15}	—	June 17, 2015	Haleakala	Pan-STARRS 1	TIR	2.7 km	MPC · JPL
655456	2015 MS_{16}	—	October 23, 2012	Haleakala	Pan-STARRS 1	·	2.9 km	MPC · JPL
655457	2015 MS_{20}	—	October 31, 2005	Kitt Peak	Spacewatch	·	900 m	MPC · JPL
655458	2015 MJ_{23}	—	September 25, 2011	Haleakala	Pan-STARRS 1	·	1.9 km	MPC · JPL
655459	2015 MU_{25}	—	April 20, 2015	Haleakala	Pan-STARRS 1	·	1.9 km	MPC · JPL
655460	2015 MN_{26}	—	December 11, 2012	Mount Lemmon	Mount Lemmon Survey	·	2.6 km	MPC · JPL
655461	2015 MN_{28}	—	August 13, 2012	Kitt Peak	Spacewatch	·	690 m	MPC · JPL
655462	2015 MT_{28}	—	November 24, 2006	Kitt Peak	Spacewatch	·	2.4 km	MPC · JPL
655463	2015 MS_{29}	—	June 11, 2015	Haleakala	Pan-STARRS 1	·	1.5 km	MPC · JPL
655464	2015 MT_{30}	—	May 21, 2015	Haleakala	Pan-STARRS 1	·	2.7 km	MPC · JPL
655465	2015 MV_{30}	—	May 21, 2015	Haleakala	Pan-STARRS 1	·	3.2 km	MPC · JPL
655466	2015 MT_{32}	—	December 13, 2012	Mount Lemmon	Mount Lemmon Survey	·	2.3 km	MPC · JPL
655467	2015 MF_{35}	—	August 10, 2001	Palomar	NEAT	·	1.2 km	MPC · JPL
655468	2015 MW_{35}	—	March 31, 2015	Haleakala	Pan-STARRS 1	·	2.7 km	MPC · JPL
655469	2015 MS_{36}	—	November 26, 2012	Mount Lemmon	Mount Lemmon Survey	EOS	1.5 km	MPC · JPL
655470	2015 MD_{37}	—	October 20, 2003	Kitt Peak	Spacewatch	·	1.5 km	MPC · JPL
655471	2015 MJ_{37}	—	September 23, 2011	Haleakala	Pan-STARRS 1	·	2.5 km	MPC · JPL
655472	2015 MD_{38}	—	May 18, 2015	Haleakala	Pan-STARRS 1	·	1.6 km	MPC · JPL
655473	2015 ML_{38}	—	February 8, 2008	Mount Lemmon	Mount Lemmon Survey	·	2.4 km	MPC · JPL
655474	2015 MQ_{41}	—	February 10, 2014	Haleakala	Pan-STARRS 1	EOS	1.7 km	MPC · JPL
655475	2015 MA_{42}	—	November 2, 2007	Mount Lemmon	Mount Lemmon Survey	EOS	1.2 km	MPC · JPL
655476	2015 MM_{42}	—	August 30, 2000	Kitt Peak	Spacewatch	EOS	1.8 km	MPC · JPL
655477	2015 MF_{43}	—	December 15, 2010	Mount Lemmon	Mount Lemmon Survey	L4	7.6 km	MPC · JPL
655478	2015 MG_{43}	—	March 29, 2015	Haleakala	Pan-STARRS 1	·	2.5 km	MPC · JPL
655479	2015 MO_{44}	—	October 24, 2005	Palomar	NEAT	·	820 m	MPC · JPL
655480	2015 MT_{45}	—	December 4, 2008	Kitt Peak	Spacewatch	·	1.0 km	MPC · JPL
655481	2015 MC_{49}	—	September 23, 2008	Mount Lemmon	Mount Lemmon Survey	·	1.1 km	MPC · JPL
655482	2015 ME_{50}	—	April 24, 2014	Mount Lemmon	Mount Lemmon Survey	·	1.0 km	MPC · JPL
655483	2015 MF_{50}	—	June 17, 2015	Haleakala	Pan-STARRS 1	V	560 m	MPC · JPL
655484	2015 MH_{51}	—	March 27, 2008	Kitt Peak	Spacewatch	EOS	1.9 km	MPC · JPL
655485	2015 MQ_{54}	—	December 30, 2014	Haleakala	Pan-STARRS 1	·	1.7 km	MPC · JPL
655486	2015 MA_{55}	—	January 24, 2014	Haleakala	Pan-STARRS 1	·	1.8 km	MPC · JPL
655487	2015 MK_{55}	—	August 4, 2008	La Sagra	OAM	·	880 m	MPC · JPL
655488	2015 MR_{59}	—	September 24, 2008	Mount Lemmon	Mount Lemmon Survey	·	1.1 km	MPC · JPL
655489	2015 MO_{61}	—	October 10, 2008	Mount Lemmon	Mount Lemmon Survey	·	1 km	MPC · JPL
655490	2015 MO_{63}	—	August 14, 2001	Haleakala	NEAT	·	910 m	MPC · JPL
655491	2015 MU_{64}	—	February 28, 2014	Haleakala	Pan-STARRS 1	·	1.9 km	MPC · JPL
655492	2015 MD_{66}	—	April 1, 2003	Apache Point	SDSS Collaboration	·	3.1 km	MPC · JPL
655493	2015 MD_{68}	—	November 20, 2008	Kitt Peak	Spacewatch	·	1.2 km	MPC · JPL
655494	2015 MA_{69}	—	November 20, 2000	Socorro	LINEAR	·	1.1 km	MPC · JPL
655495	2015 MN_{70}	—	June 18, 2015	Haleakala	Pan-STARRS 1	·	2.4 km	MPC · JPL
655496	2015 MX_{75}	—	September 25, 2008	Mount Lemmon	Mount Lemmon Survey	V	430 m	MPC · JPL
655497	2015 MY_{75}	—	September 18, 2003	Palomar	NEAT	(5)	1.1 km	MPC · JPL
655498	2015 MU_{78}	—	February 13, 2013	Nogales	M. Schwartz, P. R. Holvorcem	TIR	3.0 km	MPC · JPL
655499	2015 MR_{80}	—	July 18, 2001	Palomar	NEAT	PHO	740 m	MPC · JPL
655500	2015 MY_{80}	—	June 16, 2015	Haleakala	Pan-STARRS 1	(31811)	2.4 km	MPC · JPL

== 655501–655600 ==
back to top

Designation			Discovery			Properties		Ref
Permanent	Provisional	Named after	Date	Site	Discoverer(s)	Category	Diam.	Ref
655501	2015 MC_{83}	—	June 16, 2015	Haleakala	Pan-STARRS 1	·	2.9 km	MPC · JPL
655502	2015 MA_{84}	—	September 23, 2008	Kitt Peak	Spacewatch	V	510 m	MPC · JPL
655503	2015 MV_{84}	—	October 15, 2001	Palomar	NEAT	V	620 m	MPC · JPL
655504	2015 MU_{85}	—	June 22, 2015	Haleakala	Pan-STARRS 1	·	2.4 km	MPC · JPL
655505	2015 MC_{91}	—	October 12, 2010	Kitt Peak	Spacewatch	·	2.9 km	MPC · JPL
655506	2015 MJ_{93}	—	July 31, 2005	Palomar	NEAT	·	800 m	MPC · JPL
655507	2015 MT_{99}	—	June 23, 2015	Haleakala	Pan-STARRS 1	·	540 m	MPC · JPL
655508	2015 MU_{102}	—	April 25, 2007	Mount Lemmon	Mount Lemmon Survey	PHO	770 m	MPC · JPL
655509	2015 MX_{102}	—	June 25, 2015	Haleakala	Pan-STARRS 1	BRA	1.6 km	MPC · JPL
655510	2015 ML_{105}	—	February 28, 2008	Mount Lemmon	Mount Lemmon Survey	·	2.0 km	MPC · JPL
655511	2015 MT_{105}	—	May 22, 2015	Haleakala	Pan-STARRS 1	·	1.2 km	MPC · JPL
655512	2015 MZ_{105}	—	October 25, 2008	La Cañada	Lacruz, J.	·	1.1 km	MPC · JPL
655513	2015 ML_{108}	—	October 19, 2012	Mount Lemmon	Mount Lemmon Survey	·	1.3 km	MPC · JPL
655514	2015 MZ_{108}	—	March 28, 2014	Mount Lemmon	Mount Lemmon Survey	·	2.3 km	MPC · JPL
655515	2015 MG_{109}	—	October 6, 1996	Kitt Peak	Spacewatch	·	1.2 km	MPC · JPL
655516	2015 MQ_{109}	—	June 26, 2015	Haleakala	Pan-STARRS 1	·	1.0 km	MPC · JPL
655517	2015 MH_{112}	—	June 4, 2011	Mount Lemmon	Mount Lemmon Survey	·	1.2 km	MPC · JPL
655518	2015 MM_{113}	—	August 19, 2004	Siding Spring	SSS	·	1.2 km	MPC · JPL
655519	2015 MG_{114}	—	February 8, 2013	Haleakala	Pan-STARRS 1	·	2.3 km	MPC · JPL
655520	2015 MB_{118}	—	December 3, 2008	Mount Lemmon	Mount Lemmon Survey	·	1.1 km	MPC · JPL
655521	2015 MT_{121}	—	July 26, 2011	Haleakala	Pan-STARRS 1	·	1.2 km	MPC · JPL
655522	2015 MS_{123}	—	September 3, 2010	Mount Lemmon	Mount Lemmon Survey	EOS	1.9 km	MPC · JPL
655523	2015 MB_{129}	—	June 29, 2015	Haleakala	Pan-STARRS 1	PHO	940 m	MPC · JPL
655524	2015 MH_{129}	—	October 23, 2011	Haleakala	Pan-STARRS 1	EOS	2.3 km	MPC · JPL
655525	2015 MK_{131}	—	June 27, 2015	Haleakala	Pan-STARRS 2	H	440 m	MPC · JPL
655526	2015 MP_{134}	—	April 23, 2014	Cerro Tololo-DECam	DECam	·	2.3 km	MPC · JPL
655527	2015 MG_{135}	—	June 27, 2015	Haleakala	Pan-STARRS 1	·	1.1 km	MPC · JPL
655528	2015 MN_{135}	—	June 22, 2015	Haleakala	Pan-STARRS 1	·	2.4 km	MPC · JPL
655529	2015 MF_{137}	—	June 26, 2015	Haleakala	Pan-STARRS 1	·	2.0 km	MPC · JPL
655530	2015 ML_{137}	—	June 23, 2015	Haleakala	Pan-STARRS 1	·	860 m	MPC · JPL
655531	2015 MF_{148}	—	July 16, 2004	Cerro Tololo	Deep Ecliptic Survey	·	2.5 km	MPC · JPL
655532	2015 MG_{150}	—	June 28, 2015	Haleakala	Pan-STARRS 1	·	3.0 km	MPC · JPL
655533	2015 MM_{150}	—	July 10, 2016	Mount Lemmon	Mount Lemmon Survey	·	4.2 km	MPC · JPL
655534	2015 MO_{153}	—	November 5, 1996	Kitt Peak	Spacewatch	·	970 m	MPC · JPL
655535	2015 MA_{156}	—	June 25, 2015	Haleakala	Pan-STARRS 1	·	920 m	MPC · JPL
655536	2015 MO_{165}	—	June 22, 2015	Haleakala	Pan-STARRS 1	·	2.0 km	MPC · JPL
655537	2015 MV_{167}	—	May 8, 2014	Haleakala	Pan-STARRS 1	·	2.3 km	MPC · JPL
655538	2015 MN_{172}	—	June 28, 2015	Haleakala	Pan-STARRS 1	·	2.2 km	MPC · JPL
655539	2015 MZ_{174}	—	June 22, 2015	Haleakala	Pan-STARRS 1	VER	2.3 km	MPC · JPL
655540	2015 MX_{180}	—	June 20, 2015	Haleakala	Pan-STARRS 1	·	1.2 km	MPC · JPL
655541	2015 MR_{183}	—	June 17, 2015	Mount Lemmon	Mount Lemmon Survey	·	2.7 km	MPC · JPL
655542	2015 MP_{188}	—	June 30, 2015	Haleakala	Pan-STARRS 1	·	2.5 km	MPC · JPL
655543	2015 MA_{202}	—	June 22, 2015	Haleakala	Pan-STARRS 1	·	2.8 km	MPC · JPL
655544	2015 NY_{4}	—	September 2, 2008	Kitt Peak	Spacewatch	·	910 m	MPC · JPL
655545	2015 NO_{7}	—	June 14, 2015	Mount Lemmon	Mount Lemmon Survey	·	2.5 km	MPC · JPL
655546	2015 NK_{9}	—	September 22, 2008	Kitt Peak	Spacewatch	·	900 m	MPC · JPL
655547	2015 NO_{12}	—	March 2, 2008	Siding Spring	SSS	PHO	1.1 km	MPC · JPL
655548	2015 NH_{19}	—	June 25, 2015	Haleakala	Pan-STARRS 1	·	1.0 km	MPC · JPL
655549	2015 NN_{20}	—	January 29, 2014	Mount Lemmon	Mount Lemmon Survey	·	920 m	MPC · JPL
655550	2015 NT_{26}	—	July 8, 2015	Haleakala	Pan-STARRS 1	·	2.8 km	MPC · JPL
655551	2015 NG_{27}	—	July 9, 2015	Haleakala	Pan-STARRS 1	·	810 m	MPC · JPL
655552	2015 NR_{28}	—	February 8, 2007	Kitt Peak	Spacewatch	EUP	3.5 km	MPC · JPL
655553	2015 NL_{29}	—	July 9, 2015	Haleakala	Pan-STARRS 1	·	1.9 km	MPC · JPL
655554	2015 NF_{38}	—	February 14, 2013	Haleakala	Pan-STARRS 1	L4	6.8 km	MPC · JPL
655555	2015 OA	—	July 14, 2015	Haleakala	Pan-STARRS 1	·	1.1 km	MPC · JPL
655556	2015 OG_{2}	—	April 24, 2011	Kitt Peak	Spacewatch	·	1 km	MPC · JPL
655557	2015 OM_{2}	—	June 12, 2015	Haleakala	Pan-STARRS 1	TIR	2.6 km	MPC · JPL
655558	2015 OA_{5}	—	August 24, 2003	Palomar	NEAT	·	1.5 km	MPC · JPL
655559	2015 OD_{6}	—	June 4, 2003	Kitt Peak	Spacewatch	·	1.5 km	MPC · JPL
655560	2015 OZ_{6}	—	December 1, 2005	Mount Lemmon	Mount Lemmon Survey	·	840 m	MPC · JPL
655561	2015 OW_{9}	—	October 28, 2008	Mount Lemmon	Mount Lemmon Survey	·	920 m	MPC · JPL
655562	2015 OJ_{10}	—	September 2, 2010	Mount Lemmon	Mount Lemmon Survey	·	2.4 km	MPC · JPL
655563	2015 OU_{10}	—	March 31, 2004	Kitt Peak	Spacewatch	(2076)	740 m	MPC · JPL
655564	2015 OS_{12}	—	January 30, 2006	Kitt Peak	Spacewatch	·	900 m	MPC · JPL
655565	2015 OH_{15}	—	January 5, 2013	Kitt Peak	Spacewatch	EOS	1.8 km	MPC · JPL
655566	2015 OT_{15}	—	July 18, 2015	Haleakala	Pan-STARRS 1	·	2.3 km	MPC · JPL
655567	2015 OM_{16}	—	March 1, 2008	Kitt Peak	Spacewatch	·	2.8 km	MPC · JPL
655568	2015 OP_{18}	—	July 18, 2015	Haleakala	Pan-STARRS 1	·	730 m	MPC · JPL
655569	2015 OR_{19}	—	May 6, 2014	Haleakala	Pan-STARRS 1	EOS	1.8 km	MPC · JPL
655570	2015 OV_{19}	—	June 12, 2015	Haleakala	Pan-STARRS 1	H	470 m	MPC · JPL
655571	2015 OF_{21}	—	September 26, 2008	Kitt Peak	Spacewatch	·	950 m	MPC · JPL
655572	2015 OS_{22}	—	October 21, 2008	Mount Lemmon	Mount Lemmon Survey	·	1.1 km	MPC · JPL
655573	2015 OC_{23}	—	November 6, 2008	Kitt Peak	Spacewatch	·	1.0 km	MPC · JPL
655574	2015 OZ_{23}	—	April 25, 2014	Mount Lemmon	Mount Lemmon Survey	·	2.6 km	MPC · JPL
655575	2015 ON_{27}	—	December 6, 2005	Kitt Peak	Spacewatch	·	2.7 km	MPC · JPL
655576	2015 OR_{29}	—	October 8, 2004	Kitt Peak	Spacewatch	(6769)	950 m	MPC · JPL
655577	2015 OW_{29}	—	July 23, 2015	Haleakala	Pan-STARRS 1	MAS	530 m	MPC · JPL
655578	2015 OX_{29}	—	January 10, 2013	Haleakala	Pan-STARRS 1	NYS	1.1 km	MPC · JPL
655579	2015 OA_{30}	—	December 21, 2008	Kitt Peak	Spacewatch	MAS	720 m	MPC · JPL
655580	2015 OY_{33}	—	November 5, 2005	Catalina	CSS	V	590 m	MPC · JPL
655581	2015 OH_{34}	—	July 19, 2015	Haleakala	Pan-STARRS 2	·	840 m	MPC · JPL
655582	2015 OB_{36}	—	November 8, 2008	Kitt Peak	Spacewatch	NYS	1.1 km	MPC · JPL
655583	2015 OC_{38}	—	April 29, 2011	Mount Lemmon	Mount Lemmon Survey	·	1.1 km	MPC · JPL
655584	2015 OK_{38}	—	January 15, 2005	Kitt Peak	Spacewatch	EUN	1.4 km	MPC · JPL
655585	2015 ON_{38}	—	September 4, 2008	Kitt Peak	Spacewatch	·	740 m	MPC · JPL
655586	2015 OX_{38}	—	September 21, 2011	Haleakala	Pan-STARRS 1	·	1.2 km	MPC · JPL
655587	2015 OV_{39}	—	April 10, 2014	Haleakala	Pan-STARRS 1	·	2.3 km	MPC · JPL
655588	2015 OG_{41}	—	September 3, 2008	Kitt Peak	Spacewatch	·	650 m	MPC · JPL
655589	2015 OJ_{44}	—	April 1, 2011	Kitt Peak	Spacewatch	·	760 m	MPC · JPL
655590	2015 OR_{46}	—	February 29, 2004	Kitt Peak	Spacewatch	·	600 m	MPC · JPL
655591	2015 OS_{47}	—	July 26, 2015	Haleakala	Pan-STARRS 1	·	2.8 km	MPC · JPL
655592	2015 OH_{48}	—	October 25, 2008	Kitt Peak	Spacewatch	·	820 m	MPC · JPL
655593	2015 OU_{54}	—	October 3, 2000	Socorro	LINEAR	·	970 m	MPC · JPL
655594	2015 OJ_{59}	—	June 2, 2003	Kitt Peak	Spacewatch	·	2.7 km	MPC · JPL
655595	2015 OL_{66}	—	April 28, 2011	Mayhill-ISON	L. Elenin	·	840 m	MPC · JPL
655596	2015 OP_{66}	—	March 10, 2007	Mount Lemmon	Mount Lemmon Survey	·	1.1 km	MPC · JPL
655597	2015 OA_{67}	—	November 7, 2008	Mount Lemmon	Mount Lemmon Survey	·	1.1 km	MPC · JPL
655598	2015 OS_{67}	—	October 26, 2008	Mount Lemmon	Mount Lemmon Survey	·	900 m	MPC · JPL
655599	2015 OJ_{69}	—	July 27, 2015	Haleakala	Pan-STARRS 1	·	2.8 km	MPC · JPL
655600	2015 OV_{69}	—	June 21, 2015	Mount Lemmon	Mount Lemmon Survey	·	700 m	MPC · JPL

== 655601–655700 ==
back to top

Designation			Discovery			Properties		Ref
Permanent	Provisional	Named after	Date	Site	Discoverer(s)	Category	Diam.	Ref
655601	2015 OB_{72}	—	September 29, 2008	Mount Lemmon	Mount Lemmon Survey	V	440 m	MPC · JPL
655602	2015 OU_{73}	—	July 23, 2015	Haleakala	Pan-STARRS 1	V	570 m	MPC · JPL
655603	2015 OA_{74}	—	June 8, 2008	Kitt Peak	Spacewatch	·	530 m	MPC · JPL
655604	2015 OJ_{74}	—	December 1, 2005	Kitt Peak	Wasserman, L. H., Millis, R. L.	·	1.2 km	MPC · JPL
655605	2015 OQ_{74}	—	August 6, 2004	Palomar	NEAT	·	2.9 km	MPC · JPL
655606	2015 OH_{75}	—	June 22, 2011	Mount Lemmon	Mount Lemmon Survey	·	1.1 km	MPC · JPL
655607	2015 OL_{75}	—	November 30, 2008	Mount Lemmon	Mount Lemmon Survey	·	1.1 km	MPC · JPL
655608	2015 OF_{76}	—	July 29, 2001	Palomar	NEAT	·	1.9 km	MPC · JPL
655609	2015 OG_{76}	—	March 5, 2006	Mount Lemmon	Mount Lemmon Survey	NYS	1.1 km	MPC · JPL
655610	2015 OV_{76}	—	October 26, 2008	Mount Lemmon	Mount Lemmon Survey	·	890 m	MPC · JPL
655611	2015 OG_{77}	—	August 20, 2004	Kitt Peak	Spacewatch	NYS	850 m	MPC · JPL
655612	2015 OG_{78}	—	September 29, 2008	Mount Lemmon	Mount Lemmon Survey	·	1.0 km	MPC · JPL
655613	2015 OV_{78}	—	July 24, 2015	Haleakala	Pan-STARRS 1	H	370 m	MPC · JPL
655614	2015 OS_{80}	—	March 29, 2014	Mount Lemmon	Mount Lemmon Survey	H	370 m	MPC · JPL
655615	2015 OR_{85}	—	April 1, 2014	Mount Lemmon	Mount Lemmon Survey	·	1.5 km	MPC · JPL
655616	2015 OV_{86}	—	July 19, 2015	Haleakala	Pan-STARRS 1	·	3.0 km	MPC · JPL
655617	2015 OW_{88}	—	July 18, 2015	Haleakala	Pan-STARRS 1	·	1.1 km	MPC · JPL
655618	2015 OE_{89}	—	July 25, 2015	Haleakala	Pan-STARRS 1	·	1.0 km	MPC · JPL
655619	2015 OG_{89}	—	October 8, 2008	Mount Lemmon	Mount Lemmon Survey	·	900 m	MPC · JPL
655620	2015 ON_{95}	—	September 24, 2008	Mount Lemmon	Mount Lemmon Survey	·	1.2 km	MPC · JPL
655621	2015 OU_{97}	—	January 23, 2007	Anderson Mesa	LONEOS	·	3.4 km	MPC · JPL
655622	2015 OK_{99}	—	August 14, 2004	Cerro Tololo	Deep Ecliptic Survey	·	2.9 km	MPC · JPL
655623	2015 OM_{105}	—	July 28, 2015	Haleakala	Pan-STARRS 1	·	880 m	MPC · JPL
655624	2015 OK_{120}	—	July 23, 2015	Haleakala	Pan-STARRS 2	V	500 m	MPC · JPL
655625	2015 OK_{123}	—	July 24, 2015	Haleakala	Pan-STARRS 1	·	2.5 km	MPC · JPL
655626	2015 OX_{123}	—	July 24, 2015	Haleakala	Pan-STARRS 1	·	580 m	MPC · JPL
655627	2015 OY_{123}	—	July 25, 2015	Haleakala	Pan-STARRS 1	H	350 m	MPC · JPL
655628	2015 OK_{147}	—	January 29, 2014	Mount Lemmon	Mount Lemmon Survey	·	660 m	MPC · JPL
655629	2015 OQ_{156}	—	January 18, 2012	Kitt Peak	Spacewatch	·	2.4 km	MPC · JPL
655630	2015 OF_{163}	—	July 25, 2015	Haleakala	Pan-STARRS 1	·	1.2 km	MPC · JPL
655631	2015 OO_{164}	—	July 24, 2015	Haleakala	Pan-STARRS 1	·	2.5 km	MPC · JPL
655632	2015 PO	—	July 23, 2015	Haleakala	Pan-STARRS 2	H	430 m	MPC · JPL
655633	2015 PX	—	June 12, 2004	Socorro	LINEAR	PHO	1.5 km	MPC · JPL
655634	2015 PZ_{3}	—	November 1, 2008	Mount Lemmon	Mount Lemmon Survey	·	1.2 km	MPC · JPL
655635	2015 PO_{5}	—	September 7, 2008	Mount Lemmon	Mount Lemmon Survey	MAS	550 m	MPC · JPL
655636	2015 PP_{5}	—	July 14, 2015	Haleakala	Pan-STARRS 1	·	960 m	MPC · JPL
655637	2015 PR_{5}	—	April 22, 2007	Kitt Peak	Spacewatch	·	1.2 km	MPC · JPL
655638	2015 PT_{5}	—	August 25, 2004	Kitt Peak	Spacewatch	·	1.1 km	MPC · JPL
655639	2015 PU_{5}	—	June 30, 2015	Haleakala	Pan-STARRS 1	·	1.1 km	MPC · JPL
655640	2015 PK_{8}	—	July 18, 2015	Haleakala	Pan-STARRS 1	H	440 m	MPC · JPL
655641	2015 PQ_{9}	—	October 22, 2012	Haleakala	Pan-STARRS 1	·	920 m	MPC · JPL
655642	2015 PP_{11}	—	February 14, 2013	Kitt Peak	Spacewatch	·	1.1 km	MPC · JPL
655643	2015 PV_{11}	—	April 25, 2003	Kitt Peak	Spacewatch	·	1.3 km	MPC · JPL
655644	2015 PV_{12}	—	July 27, 2011	Haleakala	Pan-STARRS 1	·	1.7 km	MPC · JPL
655645	2015 PE_{13}	—	October 13, 2005	Kitt Peak	Spacewatch	·	2.0 km	MPC · JPL
655646	2015 PK_{13}	—	February 14, 2013	Haleakala	Pan-STARRS 1	VER	2.6 km	MPC · JPL
655647	2015 PG_{15}	—	September 17, 2004	Kitt Peak	Spacewatch	·	850 m	MPC · JPL
655648	2015 PZ_{16}	—	November 27, 2011	Mount Lemmon	Mount Lemmon Survey	·	2.9 km	MPC · JPL
655649	2015 PB_{20}	—	April 1, 2014	Mount Lemmon	Mount Lemmon Survey	·	2.6 km	MPC · JPL
655650	2015 PY_{20}	—	December 23, 2012	Haleakala	Pan-STARRS 1	·	3.0 km	MPC · JPL
655651	2015 PK_{21}	—	February 15, 2013	Haleakala	Pan-STARRS 1	·	2.4 km	MPC · JPL
655652	2015 PP_{28}	—	August 8, 2015	Haleakala	Pan-STARRS 1	·	680 m	MPC · JPL
655653	2015 PW_{30}	—	July 23, 2015	Haleakala	Pan-STARRS 1	V	630 m	MPC · JPL
655654	2015 PE_{31}	—	December 14, 2001	Kitt Peak	Spacewatch	·	800 m	MPC · JPL
655655	2015 PM_{32}	—	August 8, 2015	Haleakala	Pan-STARRS 1	·	3.0 km	MPC · JPL
655656	2015 PT_{37}	—	June 17, 2015	Haleakala	Pan-STARRS 1	·	1.5 km	MPC · JPL
655657	2015 PL_{45}	—	July 24, 2015	Haleakala	Pan-STARRS 1	VER	2.7 km	MPC · JPL
655658	2015 PJ_{46}	—	November 26, 2012	Mount Lemmon	Mount Lemmon Survey	V	630 m	MPC · JPL
655659	2015 PW_{46}	—	October 30, 2010	Mount Lemmon	Mount Lemmon Survey	·	3.1 km	MPC · JPL
655660	2015 PY_{46}	—	July 28, 2015	Haleakala	Pan-STARRS 1	·	1.1 km	MPC · JPL
655661	2015 PA_{50}	—	March 30, 2008	Kitt Peak	Spacewatch	·	540 m	MPC · JPL
655662	2015 PV_{52}	—	March 31, 2014	Mount Lemmon	Mount Lemmon Survey	TIR	3.4 km	MPC · JPL
655663	2015 PD_{53}	—	April 4, 2008	Kitt Peak	Spacewatch	·	3.3 km	MPC · JPL
655664	2015 PZ_{54}	—	August 9, 2015	Haleakala	Pan-STARRS 1	·	710 m	MPC · JPL
655665	2015 PG_{56}	—	February 21, 2014	Kitt Peak	Spacewatch	·	1.2 km	MPC · JPL
655666	2015 PZ_{63}	—	January 13, 2008	Kitt Peak	Spacewatch	·	2.6 km	MPC · JPL
655667	2015 PH_{65}	—	September 3, 2000	Socorro	LINEAR	·	1.2 km	MPC · JPL
655668	2015 PW_{67}	—	August 26, 2012	Haleakala	Pan-STARRS 1	·	550 m	MPC · JPL
655669	2015 PV_{70}	—	September 23, 2008	Siding Spring	SSS	NYS	850 m	MPC · JPL
655670	2015 PF_{71}	—	June 26, 2015	Haleakala	Pan-STARRS 1	·	860 m	MPC · JPL
655671	2015 PQ_{71}	—	February 2, 2008	Mount Lemmon	Mount Lemmon Survey	TEL	1.1 km	MPC · JPL
655672	2015 PY_{71}	—	October 24, 2008	Catalina	CSS	·	980 m	MPC · JPL
655673	2015 PP_{72}	—	October 23, 2011	Haleakala	Pan-STARRS 1	EOS	1.4 km	MPC · JPL
655674	2015 PQ_{77}	—	May 23, 2011	Mount Lemmon	Mount Lemmon Survey	·	970 m	MPC · JPL
655675	2015 PB_{79}	—	October 20, 2008	Kitt Peak	Spacewatch	·	1.0 km	MPC · JPL
655676	2015 PX_{81}	—	February 25, 2007	Kitt Peak	Spacewatch	MAS	570 m	MPC · JPL
655677	2015 PY_{84}	—	April 18, 2007	Kitt Peak	Spacewatch	MAS	700 m	MPC · JPL
655678	2015 PZ_{89}	—	July 19, 2015	Haleakala	Pan-STARRS 1	·	2.7 km	MPC · JPL
655679	2015 PV_{90}	—	October 19, 2003	Kitt Peak	Spacewatch	·	880 m	MPC · JPL
655680	2015 PC_{92}	—	August 10, 2015	Haleakala	Pan-STARRS 1	·	870 m	MPC · JPL
655681	2015 PG_{95}	—	January 13, 2005	Kitt Peak	Spacewatch	EUN	1.3 km	MPC · JPL
655682	2015 PN_{97}	—	January 5, 2014	Haleakala	Pan-STARRS 1	·	620 m	MPC · JPL
655683	2015 PU_{98}	—	July 18, 2015	Haleakala	Pan-STARRS 1	·	2.1 km	MPC · JPL
655684	2015 PB_{102}	—	November 27, 2012	Mount Lemmon	Mount Lemmon Survey	·	1.1 km	MPC · JPL
655685	2015 PE_{102}	—	November 12, 2010	Mount Lemmon	Mount Lemmon Survey	(260)	2.7 km	MPC · JPL
655686	2015 PJ_{110}	—	February 28, 2008	Mount Lemmon	Mount Lemmon Survey	·	2.0 km	MPC · JPL
655687	2015 PQ_{111}	—	August 5, 2015	Haleakala	Pan-STARRS 1	·	870 m	MPC · JPL
655688	2015 PK_{118}	—	May 3, 2008	Mount Lemmon	Mount Lemmon Survey	·	560 m	MPC · JPL
655689	2015 PG_{124}	—	August 10, 2015	Haleakala	Pan-STARRS 1	·	2.4 km	MPC · JPL
655690	2015 PM_{124}	—	September 25, 2008	Kitt Peak	Spacewatch	·	860 m	MPC · JPL
655691	2015 PU_{125}	—	August 10, 2015	Haleakala	Pan-STARRS 1	·	2.8 km	MPC · JPL
655692	2015 PL_{133}	—	August 10, 2015	Haleakala	Pan-STARRS 1	·	2.4 km	MPC · JPL
655693	2015 PB_{139}	—	December 22, 2012	Haleakala	Pan-STARRS 1	PHO	560 m	MPC · JPL
655694	2015 PE_{139}	—	January 31, 2006	Kitt Peak	Spacewatch	NYS	630 m	MPC · JPL
655695	2015 PF_{141}	—	August 10, 2015	Haleakala	Pan-STARRS 1	·	2.8 km	MPC · JPL
655696	2015 PM_{142}	—	February 27, 2014	Mount Lemmon	Mount Lemmon Survey	·	840 m	MPC · JPL
655697	2015 PS_{148}	—	February 26, 2014	Oukaïmeden	M. Ory	·	2.5 km	MPC · JPL
655698	2015 PM_{150}	—	August 10, 2015	Haleakala	Pan-STARRS 1	·	480 m	MPC · JPL
655699	2015 PE_{154}	—	September 23, 2008	Mount Lemmon	Mount Lemmon Survey	·	700 m	MPC · JPL
655700	2015 PX_{154}	—	July 12, 2015	Haleakala	Pan-STARRS 1	·	870 m	MPC · JPL

== 655701–655800 ==
back to top

Designation			Discovery			Properties		Ref
Permanent	Provisional	Named after	Date	Site	Discoverer(s)	Category	Diam.	Ref
655701	2015 PG_{157}	—	August 10, 2015	Haleakala	Pan-STARRS 1	·	1.4 km	MPC · JPL
655702	2015 PH_{157}	—	April 8, 2010	Kitt Peak	Spacewatch	·	1.1 km	MPC · JPL
655703	2015 PU_{163}	—	February 26, 2014	Haleakala	Pan-STARRS 1	·	920 m	MPC · JPL
655704	2015 PA_{167}	—	September 23, 2008	Mount Lemmon	Mount Lemmon Survey	MAS	580 m	MPC · JPL
655705	2015 PP_{169}	—	August 10, 2015	Haleakala	Pan-STARRS 1	·	720 m	MPC · JPL
655706	2015 PG_{172}	—	October 7, 2004	Kitt Peak	Spacewatch	·	770 m	MPC · JPL
655707	2015 PK_{175}	—	December 11, 2012	Mount Lemmon	Mount Lemmon Survey	·	730 m	MPC · JPL
655708	2015 PE_{178}	—	September 14, 2010	Kitt Peak	Spacewatch	VER	2.6 km	MPC · JPL
655709	2015 PN_{187}	—	August 10, 2015	Haleakala	Pan-STARRS 1	·	580 m	MPC · JPL
655710	2015 PR_{188}	—	December 30, 2007	Kitt Peak	Spacewatch	·	1.6 km	MPC · JPL
655711	2015 PA_{196}	—	July 24, 2015	Haleakala	Pan-STARRS 1	·	2.4 km	MPC · JPL
655712	2015 PK_{198}	—	September 22, 2008	Kitt Peak	Spacewatch	·	780 m	MPC · JPL
655713	2015 PT_{199}	—	April 20, 2007	Kitt Peak	Spacewatch	·	930 m	MPC · JPL
655714	2015 PE_{200}	—	November 17, 2004	Campo Imperatore	CINEOS	NYS	890 m	MPC · JPL
655715	2015 PZ_{200}	—	August 10, 2015	Haleakala	Pan-STARRS 1	·	920 m	MPC · JPL
655716	2015 PR_{202}	—	September 2, 2008	Kitt Peak	Spacewatch	·	670 m	MPC · JPL
655717	2015 PR_{204}	—	August 10, 2015	Haleakala	Pan-STARRS 1	·	960 m	MPC · JPL
655718	2015 PM_{207}	—	November 3, 2005	Kitt Peak	Spacewatch	·	3.3 km	MPC · JPL
655719	2015 PM_{214}	—	September 10, 2010	Mount Lemmon	Mount Lemmon Survey	·	2.2 km	MPC · JPL
655720	2015 PZ_{215}	—	August 10, 2015	Haleakala	Pan-STARRS 1	TIR	2.6 km	MPC · JPL
655721	2015 PO_{218}	—	January 10, 2013	Haleakala	Pan-STARRS 1	·	2.5 km	MPC · JPL
655722	2015 PE_{228}	—	January 21, 2014	Haleakala	Pan-STARRS 1	H	340 m	MPC · JPL
655723	2015 PJ_{236}	—	February 7, 2008	Kitt Peak	Spacewatch	·	1.9 km	MPC · JPL
655724	2015 PM_{236}	—	May 31, 2011	Kitt Peak	Spacewatch	·	1.1 km	MPC · JPL
655725	2015 PU_{240}	—	October 28, 2005	Mount Lemmon	Mount Lemmon Survey	·	2.3 km	MPC · JPL
655726	2015 PV_{249}	—	December 8, 2012	Kitt Peak	Spacewatch	·	760 m	MPC · JPL
655727	2015 PK_{262}	—	October 21, 2012	Mount Lemmon	Mount Lemmon Survey	·	1.1 km	MPC · JPL
655728	2015 PO_{262}	—	September 6, 2008	Mount Lemmon	Mount Lemmon Survey	MAS	530 m	MPC · JPL
655729	2015 PW_{270}	—	October 8, 2008	Catalina	CSS	·	840 m	MPC · JPL
655730	2015 PJ_{271}	—	September 7, 2004	Kitt Peak	Spacewatch	·	2.4 km	MPC · JPL
655731	2015 PY_{274}	—	October 31, 2008	Kitt Peak	Spacewatch	·	940 m	MPC · JPL
655732	2015 PE_{276}	—	May 14, 2008	Mount Lemmon	Mount Lemmon Survey	·	2.7 km	MPC · JPL
655733	2015 PQ_{277}	—	December 28, 2005	Kitt Peak	Spacewatch	V	420 m	MPC · JPL
655734	2015 PE_{279}	—	January 27, 2007	Kitt Peak	Spacewatch	·	2.6 km	MPC · JPL
655735	2015 PR_{287}	—	December 30, 2005	Kitt Peak	Spacewatch	·	3.3 km	MPC · JPL
655736	2015 PY_{289}	—	August 12, 2015	Haleakala	Pan-STARRS 1	·	3.0 km	MPC · JPL
655737	2015 PX_{290}	—	August 12, 2015	Haleakala	Pan-STARRS 1	·	2.7 km	MPC · JPL
655738	2015 PJ_{291}	—	August 7, 2004	Palomar	NEAT	NYS	940 m	MPC · JPL
655739	2015 PK_{295}	—	October 10, 2005	Kitt Peak	Spacewatch	PHO	630 m	MPC · JPL
655740	2015 PF_{296}	—	May 30, 2015	Haleakala	Pan-STARRS 1	·	2.7 km	MPC · JPL
655741	2015 PL_{296}	—	April 15, 2007	Mount Lemmon	Mount Lemmon Survey	·	1.1 km	MPC · JPL
655742	2015 PY_{296}	—	November 30, 2008	Kitt Peak	Spacewatch	·	990 m	MPC · JPL
655743	2015 PP_{298}	—	July 24, 2015	Haleakala	Pan-STARRS 1	·	1 km	MPC · JPL
655744	2015 PH_{299}	—	April 22, 2007	Mount Lemmon	Mount Lemmon Survey	MAS	630 m	MPC · JPL
655745	2015 PY_{299}	—	May 23, 2011	Nogales	M. Schwartz, P. R. Holvorcem	ERI	1.5 km	MPC · JPL
655746	2015 PM_{302}	—	July 24, 2015	Haleakala	Pan-STARRS 1	·	730 m	MPC · JPL
655747	2015 PS_{304}	—	July 24, 2015	Haleakala	Pan-STARRS 1	·	840 m	MPC · JPL
655748	2015 PF_{308}	—	July 28, 2015	Haleakala	Pan-STARRS 1	·	1.1 km	MPC · JPL
655749	2015 PM_{308}	—	October 17, 2008	Kitt Peak	Spacewatch	·	960 m	MPC · JPL
655750	2015 PD_{309}	—	July 23, 2015	Haleakala	Pan-STARRS 1	NYS	1.0 km	MPC · JPL
655751	2015 PS_{309}	—	August 13, 2015	Haleakala	Pan-STARRS 1	·	1.2 km	MPC · JPL
655752	2015 PX_{309}	—	September 28, 2003	Anderson Mesa	LONEOS	·	1.2 km	MPC · JPL
655753	2015 PY_{311}	—	February 28, 2014	Haleakala	Pan-STARRS 1	·	1.2 km	MPC · JPL
655754	2015 PF_{316}	—	August 6, 2015	Haleakala	Pan-STARRS 1	ELF	3.2 km	MPC · JPL
655755	2015 PZ_{316}	—	August 5, 2015	Haleakala	Pan-STARRS 1	·	2.3 km	MPC · JPL
655756	2015 PF_{317}	—	August 22, 2004	Kitt Peak	Spacewatch	·	2.2 km	MPC · JPL
655757	2015 PN_{319}	—	March 24, 2014	Haleakala	Pan-STARRS 1	·	1.1 km	MPC · JPL
655758	2015 PB_{323}	—	November 11, 2010	Catalina	CSS	·	2.5 km	MPC · JPL
655759	2015 PO_{323}	—	March 19, 2001	Apache Point	SDSS Collaboration	·	2.9 km	MPC · JPL
655760	2015 PY_{331}	—	August 9, 2015	Haleakala	Pan-STARRS 1	·	570 m	MPC · JPL
655761	2015 PT_{343}	—	August 11, 2015	Haleakala	Pan-STARRS 1	·	2.3 km	MPC · JPL
655762	2015 PL_{347}	—	March 27, 2014	Haleakala	Pan-STARRS 1	·	2.7 km	MPC · JPL
655763	2015 QJ_{5}	—	April 24, 2007	Kitt Peak	Spacewatch	MAS	610 m	MPC · JPL
655764	2015 QE_{6}	—	August 19, 2015	Kitt Peak	Spacewatch	EOS	1.4 km	MPC · JPL
655765	2015 QS_{6}	—	October 29, 2008	Mount Lemmon	Mount Lemmon Survey	·	980 m	MPC · JPL
655766	2015 QY_{6}	—	September 1, 2010	Mount Lemmon	Mount Lemmon Survey	KOR	1.2 km	MPC · JPL
655767	2015 QW_{11}	—	February 13, 2002	Apache Point	SDSS	3:2	5.4 km	MPC · JPL
655768	2015 QX_{11}	—	March 11, 2014	Mount Lemmon	Mount Lemmon Survey	H	330 m	MPC · JPL
655769	2015 QV_{13}	—	November 18, 2007	Kitt Peak	Spacewatch	·	1.1 km	MPC · JPL
655770	2015 QG_{15}	—	February 25, 2014	Kitt Peak	Spacewatch	·	810 m	MPC · JPL
655771	2015 QA_{24}	—	August 21, 2015	Haleakala	Pan-STARRS 1	·	950 m	MPC · JPL
655772	2015 QS_{31}	—	March 24, 2014	Haleakala	Pan-STARRS 1	·	740 m	MPC · JPL
655773	2015 QS_{33}	—	August 18, 2015	Catalina	CSS	·	3.4 km	MPC · JPL
655774	2015 RS_{6}	—	September 5, 2015	Haleakala	Pan-STARRS 1	·	530 m	MPC · JPL
655775	2015 RR_{9}	—	September 12, 2004	Kitt Peak	Spacewatch	V	530 m	MPC · JPL
655776	2015 RS_{9}	—	September 2, 2008	Kitt Peak	Spacewatch	·	860 m	MPC · JPL
655777	2015 RJ_{11}	—	September 6, 2008	Mount Lemmon	Mount Lemmon Survey	·	650 m	MPC · JPL
655778	2015 RA_{13}	—	June 25, 2015	Haleakala	Pan-STARRS 1	·	980 m	MPC · JPL
655779	2015 RZ_{13}	—	March 14, 2011	Mount Lemmon	Mount Lemmon Survey	·	510 m	MPC · JPL
655780	2015 RG_{14}	—	January 23, 2014	Mount Lemmon	Mount Lemmon Survey	V	570 m	MPC · JPL
655781	2015 RW_{16}	—	June 21, 2010	Mount Lemmon	Mount Lemmon Survey	·	1.8 km	MPC · JPL
655782	2015 RZ_{24}	—	June 23, 2011	Mount Lemmon	Mount Lemmon Survey	·	1.1 km	MPC · JPL
655783	2015 RR_{26}	—	December 2, 2008	Kitt Peak	Spacewatch	·	1.2 km	MPC · JPL
655784	2015 RW_{26}	—	July 28, 2011	Haleakala	Pan-STARRS 1	·	1.1 km	MPC · JPL
655785	2015 RV_{28}	—	June 22, 2011	Mount Lemmon	Mount Lemmon Survey	V	570 m	MPC · JPL
655786	2015 RM_{29}	—	September 29, 2008	Mount Lemmon	Mount Lemmon Survey	·	780 m	MPC · JPL
655787	2015 RQ_{33}	—	September 9, 2015	Haleakala	Pan-STARRS 1	H	360 m	MPC · JPL
655788	2015 RZ_{46}	—	July 23, 2015	Haleakala	Pan-STARRS 1	·	960 m	MPC · JPL
655789	2015 RQ_{50}	—	May 20, 2014	Haleakala	Pan-STARRS 1	·	1.0 km	MPC · JPL
655790	2015 RG_{52}	—	December 2, 2005	Mauna Kea	A. Boattini	·	970 m	MPC · JPL
655791	2015 RF_{56}	—	February 15, 2013	Haleakala	Pan-STARRS 1	NYS	690 m	MPC · JPL
655792	2015 RM_{57}	—	August 28, 2011	Haleakala	Pan-STARRS 1	·	1.0 km	MPC · JPL
655793	2015 RS_{59}	—	March 4, 2010	Kitt Peak	Spacewatch	·	1.2 km	MPC · JPL
655794	2015 RS_{66}	—	February 28, 2014	Haleakala	Pan-STARRS 1	·	690 m	MPC · JPL
655795	2015 RP_{72}	—	September 14, 2007	Mount Lemmon	Mount Lemmon Survey	3:2 · SHU	3.5 km	MPC · JPL
655796	2015 RL_{73}	—	July 23, 2015	Haleakala	Pan-STARRS 1	MAS	590 m	MPC · JPL
655797	2015 RP_{74}	—	December 21, 2008	Mount Lemmon	Mount Lemmon Survey	·	770 m	MPC · JPL
655798	2015 RG_{75}	—	July 23, 2015	Haleakala	Pan-STARRS 1	·	1.0 km	MPC · JPL
655799	2015 RS_{75}	—	September 15, 2004	Kitt Peak	Spacewatch	·	940 m	MPC · JPL
655800	2015 RF_{77}	—	May 3, 2011	Mayhill-ISON	L. Elenin	·	580 m	MPC · JPL

== 655801–655900 ==
back to top

Designation			Discovery			Properties		Ref
Permanent	Provisional	Named after	Date	Site	Discoverer(s)	Category	Diam.	Ref
655801	2015 RX_{77}	—	July 23, 2015	Haleakala	Pan-STARRS 1	·	590 m	MPC · JPL
655802	2015 RZ_{77}	—	September 10, 2015	Haleakala	Pan-STARRS 1	·	700 m	MPC · JPL
655803	2015 RA_{84}	—	December 8, 2005	Kitt Peak	Spacewatch	·	780 m	MPC · JPL
655804	2015 RW_{85}	—	January 18, 2004	Kitt Peak	Spacewatch	MAR	920 m	MPC · JPL
655805	2015 RN_{89}	—	August 20, 2000	Kitt Peak	Spacewatch	·	2.3 km	MPC · JPL
655806	2015 RA_{90}	—	September 7, 2015	XuYi	PMO NEO Survey Program	·	2.5 km	MPC · JPL
655807	2015 RQ_{92}	—	September 2, 2008	Kitt Peak	Spacewatch	·	680 m	MPC · JPL
655808	2015 RX_{92}	—	September 15, 2004	Kitt Peak	Spacewatch	·	990 m	MPC · JPL
655809	2015 RK_{93}	—	August 21, 2015	Kitt Peak	Spacewatch	·	870 m	MPC · JPL
655810	2015 RL_{93}	—	June 2, 2015	Cerro Tololo-DECam	DECam	MAS	630 m	MPC · JPL
655811	2015 RN_{93}	—	September 27, 2008	Mount Lemmon	Mount Lemmon Survey	NYS	860 m	MPC · JPL
655812	2015 RW_{94}	—	December 4, 2008	Mount Lemmon	Mount Lemmon Survey	·	1.0 km	MPC · JPL
655813	2015 RQ_{96}	—	July 26, 2011	Haleakala	Pan-STARRS 1	·	960 m	MPC · JPL
655814	2015 RT_{96}	—	March 12, 2007	Mount Lemmon	Mount Lemmon Survey	·	3.0 km	MPC · JPL
655815	2015 RS_{97}	—	February 14, 2013	Haleakala	Pan-STARRS 1	·	2.4 km	MPC · JPL
655816	2015 RV_{98}	—	November 20, 2008	Kitt Peak	Spacewatch	·	860 m	MPC · JPL
655817	2015 RY_{98}	—	October 9, 2004	Kitt Peak	Spacewatch	·	1.1 km	MPC · JPL
655818	2015 RT_{99}	—	July 28, 2015	Haleakala	Pan-STARRS 1	·	840 m	MPC · JPL
655819	2015 RH_{100}	—	July 30, 2015	Haleakala	Pan-STARRS 1	·	950 m	MPC · JPL
655820	2015 RE_{107}	—	October 24, 2008	Kitt Peak	Spacewatch	NYS	990 m	MPC · JPL
655821	2015 RR_{107}	—	August 28, 2015	Haleakala	Pan-STARRS 1	·	2.6 km	MPC · JPL
655822	2015 RK_{109}	—	September 13, 2015	Catalina	CSS	H	580 m	MPC · JPL
655823	2015 RR_{109}	—	July 25, 2011	Haleakala	Pan-STARRS 1	·	900 m	MPC · JPL
655824	2015 RA_{111}	—	August 21, 2015	Haleakala	Pan-STARRS 1	·	2.8 km	MPC · JPL
655825	2015 RO_{115}	—	September 13, 2015	Space Surveillance	Space Surveillance Telescope	TIR	3.0 km	MPC · JPL
655826	2015 RZ_{116}	—	July 16, 2002	Palomar	NEAT	·	1.8 km	MPC · JPL
655827	2015 RJ_{118}	—	November 1, 2008	Mount Lemmon	Mount Lemmon Survey	NYS	1.1 km	MPC · JPL
655828	2015 RJ_{120}	—	November 2, 2010	Mount Lemmon	Mount Lemmon Survey	·	2.6 km	MPC · JPL
655829	2015 RP_{121}	—	November 21, 2008	Kitt Peak	Spacewatch	·	1.1 km	MPC · JPL
655830	2015 RT_{124}	—	February 22, 2014	Kitt Peak	Spacewatch	·	940 m	MPC · JPL
655831	2015 RU_{125}	—	October 17, 2010	Mount Lemmon	Mount Lemmon Survey	·	2.4 km	MPC · JPL
655832	2015 RY_{130}	—	October 20, 2008	Mount Lemmon	Mount Lemmon Survey	MAS	720 m	MPC · JPL
655833	2015 RJ_{136}	—	September 9, 2015	Haleakala	Pan-STARRS 1	·	760 m	MPC · JPL
655834	2015 RV_{137}	—	September 9, 2015	XuYi	PMO NEO Survey Program	MAS	510 m	MPC · JPL
655835	2015 RT_{148}	—	October 30, 2008	Kitt Peak	Spacewatch	·	790 m	MPC · JPL
655836	2015 RW_{158}	—	January 8, 2010	Kitt Peak	Spacewatch	·	520 m	MPC · JPL
655837	2015 RN_{159}	—	October 8, 2008	Kitt Peak	Spacewatch	·	880 m	MPC · JPL
655838	2015 RJ_{160}	—	March 11, 2003	Kitt Peak	Spacewatch	·	530 m	MPC · JPL
655839	2015 RH_{166}	—	September 9, 2015	XuYi	PMO NEO Survey Program	MAS	530 m	MPC · JPL
655840	2015 RY_{166}	—	November 27, 2006	Mauna Kea	D. D. Balam, K. M. Perrett	·	2.5 km	MPC · JPL
655841	2015 RH_{174}	—	September 5, 2008	Kitt Peak	Spacewatch	·	930 m	MPC · JPL
655842	2015 RL_{179}	—	March 26, 2007	Kitt Peak	Spacewatch	·	940 m	MPC · JPL
655843	2015 RP_{188}	—	July 12, 2015	Haleakala	Pan-STARRS 1	·	3.0 km	MPC · JPL
655844	2015 RM_{193}	—	May 3, 2003	Kitt Peak	Spacewatch	·	1.1 km	MPC · JPL
655845	2015 RM_{195}	—	April 29, 2003	Kitt Peak	Spacewatch	NYS	1.1 km	MPC · JPL
655846	2015 RX_{197}	—	December 1, 2008	Mount Lemmon	Mount Lemmon Survey	·	940 m	MPC · JPL
655847	2015 RD_{199}	—	August 3, 2000	Kitt Peak	Spacewatch	·	1.1 km	MPC · JPL
655848	2015 RW_{201}	—	September 11, 2015	Haleakala	Pan-STARRS 1	·	1.0 km	MPC · JPL
655849	2015 RC_{204}	—	October 4, 2004	Kitt Peak	Spacewatch	·	3.4 km	MPC · JPL
655850	2015 RH_{207}	—	March 25, 2003	Mauna Kea	B. J. Gladman, J. J. Kavelaars	·	700 m	MPC · JPL
655851	2015 RY_{209}	—	November 17, 2008	Kitt Peak	Spacewatch	·	760 m	MPC · JPL
655852	2015 RO_{210}	—	September 11, 2015	Haleakala	Pan-STARRS 1	H	410 m	MPC · JPL
655853	2015 RE_{213}	—	October 9, 2004	Kitt Peak	Spacewatch	MAS	700 m	MPC · JPL
655854	2015 RW_{215}	—	August 12, 2015	Haleakala	Pan-STARRS 1	NYS	830 m	MPC · JPL
655855	2015 RF_{217}	—	February 20, 2002	Kitt Peak	Spacewatch	·	2.2 km	MPC · JPL
655856	2015 RZ_{222}	—	August 31, 2000	Kitt Peak	Spacewatch	NYS	840 m	MPC · JPL
655857	2015 RS_{223}	—	October 7, 2004	Kitt Peak	Spacewatch	NYS	1.2 km	MPC · JPL
655858	2015 RB_{237}	—	May 8, 2006	Mount Lemmon	Mount Lemmon Survey	·	1.4 km	MPC · JPL
655859	2015 RD_{239}	—	December 30, 2008	Mount Lemmon	Mount Lemmon Survey	·	1.2 km	MPC · JPL
655860	2015 RJ_{239}	—	October 2, 2000	Anderson Mesa	LONEOS	·	1.2 km	MPC · JPL
655861	2015 RO_{244}	—	July 18, 2007	Eskridge	G. Hug	MAS	660 m	MPC · JPL
655862	2015 RC_{246}	—	September 13, 2007	Kitt Peak	Spacewatch	H	490 m	MPC · JPL
655863	2015 RZ_{252}	—	July 19, 2015	Haleakala	Pan-STARRS 1	·	2.3 km	MPC · JPL
655864	2015 RZ_{255}	—	February 20, 2009	Kitt Peak	Spacewatch	·	810 m	MPC · JPL
655865	2015 RC_{256}	—	September 9, 2015	Haleakala	Pan-STARRS 1	·	1.1 km	MPC · JPL
655866	2015 RW_{257}	—	October 23, 2011	Haleakala	Pan-STARRS 1	·	910 m	MPC · JPL
655867	2015 RZ_{259}	—	January 11, 2000	Kitt Peak	Spacewatch	·	1.6 km	MPC · JPL
655868	2015 RT_{260}	—	October 20, 2008	Kitt Peak	Spacewatch	·	930 m	MPC · JPL
655869	2015 RN_{261}	—	September 12, 2015	Haleakala	Pan-STARRS 1	·	710 m	MPC · JPL
655870	2015 RJ_{262}	—	April 1, 2014	Mount Lemmon	Mount Lemmon Survey	·	780 m	MPC · JPL
655871	2015 RG_{275}	—	September 12, 2015	Haleakala	Pan-STARRS 1	·	1.0 km	MPC · JPL
655872	2015 RS_{290}	—	September 6, 2015	Haleakala	Pan-STARRS 1	MAS	580 m	MPC · JPL
655873	2015 RN_{293}	—	September 10, 2015	Haleakala	Pan-STARRS 1	·	550 m	MPC · JPL
655874	2015 RL_{301}	—	September 9, 2015	Haleakala	Pan-STARRS 1	MAS	510 m	MPC · JPL
655875	2015 RZ_{301}	—	September 23, 2008	Kitt Peak	Spacewatch	·	830 m	MPC · JPL
655876	2015 RR_{303}	—	September 9, 2015	Haleakala	Pan-STARRS 1	·	2.3 km	MPC · JPL
655877	2015 RQ_{305}	—	September 9, 2015	Haleakala	Pan-STARRS 1	MAS	530 m	MPC · JPL
655878	2015 RS_{333}	—	July 16, 2004	Siding Spring	SSS	PHO	890 m	MPC · JPL
655879	2015 RG_{334}	—	September 12, 2015	XuYi	PMO NEO Survey Program	·	910 m	MPC · JPL
655880	2015 RQ_{341}	—	August 26, 2003	Cerro Tololo	Deep Ecliptic Survey	·	2.6 km	MPC · JPL
655881	2015 RJ_{347}	—	September 8, 2015	Haleakala	Pan-STARRS 1	·	2.9 km	MPC · JPL
655882	2015 RH_{356}	—	September 12, 2015	Haleakala	Pan-STARRS 1	·	790 m	MPC · JPL
655883	2015 SB_{1}	—	October 18, 2003	Palomar	NEAT	·	750 m	MPC · JPL
655884	2015 SG_{3}	—	October 20, 2003	Kitt Peak	Spacewatch	·	940 m	MPC · JPL
655885	2015 SJ_{3}	—	May 24, 2011	Mount Lemmon	Mount Lemmon Survey	·	680 m	MPC · JPL
655886	2015 SC_{4}	—	September 20, 2003	Palomar	NEAT	·	880 m	MPC · JPL
655887	2015 SM_{5}	—	December 4, 2007	Kitt Peak	Spacewatch	·	1.4 km	MPC · JPL
655888	2015 SN_{5}	—	August 17, 2001	Palomar	NEAT	·	1.9 km	MPC · JPL
655889	2015 SJ_{6}	—	November 18, 1998	Kitt Peak	Spacewatch	·	3.0 km	MPC · JPL
655890	2015 SM_{8}	—	September 3, 2002	Palomar	NEAT	H	500 m	MPC · JPL
655891	2015 SZ_{9}	—	September 22, 2015	Haleakala	Pan-STARRS 1	H	470 m	MPC · JPL
655892	2015 SK_{14}	—	February 3, 2013	Haleakala	Pan-STARRS 1	V	460 m	MPC · JPL
655893	2015 SL_{15}	—	April 4, 2008	Kitt Peak	Spacewatch	·	2.9 km	MPC · JPL
655894	2015 SM_{15}	—	August 21, 2015	Haleakala	Pan-STARRS 1	·	900 m	MPC · JPL
655895	2015 SK_{17}	—	October 31, 2010	Mount Lemmon	Mount Lemmon Survey	H	530 m	MPC · JPL
655896	2015 SN_{17}	—	September 24, 2000	Socorro	LINEAR	·	1.2 km	MPC · JPL
655897	2015 SQ_{18}	—	July 28, 2011	Siding Spring	SSS	·	930 m	MPC · JPL
655898	2015 SL_{20}	—	June 23, 2007	Kitt Peak	Spacewatch	·	930 m	MPC · JPL
655899	2015 SX_{21}	—	December 8, 2010	Mount Lemmon	Mount Lemmon Survey	H	460 m	MPC · JPL
655900	2015 SU_{23}	—	September 19, 2015	Haleakala	Pan-STARRS 1	·	1.2 km	MPC · JPL

== 655901–656000 ==
back to top

Designation			Discovery			Properties		Ref
Permanent	Provisional	Named after	Date	Site	Discoverer(s)	Category	Diam.	Ref
655901	2015 SW_{28}	—	November 14, 2010	Mount Lemmon	Mount Lemmon Survey	·	1.8 km	MPC · JPL
655902	2015 SY_{28}	—	December 4, 2008	Mount Lemmon	Mount Lemmon Survey	·	1.1 km	MPC · JPL
655903	2015 SO_{34}	—	September 19, 2015	Haleakala	Pan-STARRS 1	EUN	1.1 km	MPC · JPL
655904	2015 TZ_{2}	—	December 10, 2005	Kitt Peak	Spacewatch	·	1.9 km	MPC · JPL
655905	2015 TO_{6}	—	October 4, 2004	Kitt Peak	Spacewatch	·	830 m	MPC · JPL
655906	2015 TX_{6}	—	January 1, 2008	Catalina	CSS	·	2.8 km	MPC · JPL
655907	2015 TG_{7}	—	November 19, 2008	Kitt Peak	Spacewatch	T_{j} (2.94)	4.7 km	MPC · JPL
655908	2015 TE_{8}	—	November 13, 2006	Kitt Peak	Spacewatch	·	1.8 km	MPC · JPL
655909	2015 TR_{9}	—	June 24, 2015	Haleakala	Pan-STARRS 1	URS	2.7 km	MPC · JPL
655910	2015 TK_{10}	—	January 10, 2013	Haleakala	Pan-STARRS 1	·	790 m	MPC · JPL
655911	2015 TC_{11}	—	July 25, 2015	Haleakala	Pan-STARRS 1	V	540 m	MPC · JPL
655912	2015 TG_{15}	—	November 25, 2005	Kitt Peak	Spacewatch	VER	2.3 km	MPC · JPL
655913	2015 TM_{18}	—	October 2, 2015	Haleakala	Pan-STARRS 1	(194)	1.1 km	MPC · JPL
655914	2015 TD_{21}	—	August 12, 2015	Haleakala	Pan-STARRS 1	H	420 m	MPC · JPL
655915	2015 TB_{22}	—	December 3, 2004	Kitt Peak	Spacewatch	·	820 m	MPC · JPL
655916	2015 TL_{29}	—	March 31, 2008	Mount Lemmon	Mount Lemmon Survey	·	2.7 km	MPC · JPL
655917	2015 TO_{32}	—	March 7, 2014	Kitt Peak	Spacewatch	V	590 m	MPC · JPL
655918	2015 TB_{33}	—	October 28, 2008	Mount Lemmon	Mount Lemmon Survey	V	460 m	MPC · JPL
655919	2015 TF_{35}	—	December 4, 2005	Kitt Peak	Spacewatch	·	2.8 km	MPC · JPL
655920	2015 TJ_{35}	—	April 4, 2008	Kitt Peak	Spacewatch	VER	2.6 km	MPC · JPL
655921	2015 TS_{40}	—	August 10, 2015	Haleakala	Pan-STARRS 2	·	1.4 km	MPC · JPL
655922	2015 TN_{46}	—	February 8, 2013	Haleakala	Pan-STARRS 1	NYS	1.0 km	MPC · JPL
655923	2015 TM_{48}	—	September 5, 2008	Kitt Peak	Spacewatch	V	480 m	MPC · JPL
655924	2015 TB_{53}	—	December 30, 2005	Kitt Peak	Spacewatch	·	720 m	MPC · JPL
655925	2015 TE_{54}	—	April 4, 2014	Mount Lemmon	Mount Lemmon Survey	·	980 m	MPC · JPL
655926	2015 TH_{63}	—	March 25, 2014	Kitt Peak	Spacewatch	·	1.1 km	MPC · JPL
655927	2015 TL_{70}	—	April 15, 2010	Mount Lemmon	Mount Lemmon Survey	·	1.2 km	MPC · JPL
655928	2015 TM_{72}	—	April 16, 2013	Cerro Tololo-DECam	DECam	AGN	1 km	MPC · JPL
655929	2015 TW_{73}	—	October 25, 2011	Haleakala	Pan-STARRS 1	·	1.0 km	MPC · JPL
655930	2015 TW_{75}	—	August 12, 2015	Haleakala	Pan-STARRS 1	H	510 m	MPC · JPL
655931	2015 TS_{85}	—	October 23, 2003	Kitt Peak	Deep Ecliptic Survey	·	700 m	MPC · JPL
655932	2015 TA_{86}	—	September 17, 2006	Kitt Peak	Spacewatch	·	1.4 km	MPC · JPL
655933	2015 TY_{87}	—	September 20, 2011	Taunus	Karge, S., R. Kling	·	1.0 km	MPC · JPL
655934	2015 TB_{99}	—	December 10, 2010	Mount Lemmon	Mount Lemmon Survey	·	2.8 km	MPC · JPL
655935	2015 TB_{103}	—	October 26, 2011	Haleakala	Pan-STARRS 1	·	780 m	MPC · JPL
655936	2015 TL_{104}	—	October 11, 2007	Mount Lemmon	Mount Lemmon Survey	H	420 m	MPC · JPL
655937	2015 TA_{105}	—	January 26, 2006	Mount Lemmon	Mount Lemmon Survey	·	2.7 km	MPC · JPL
655938	2015 TX_{105}	—	November 4, 2007	Mount Lemmon	Mount Lemmon Survey	·	740 m	MPC · JPL
655939	2015 TH_{108}	—	October 8, 2015	Haleakala	Pan-STARRS 1	·	1.1 km	MPC · JPL
655940	2015 TE_{110}	—	July 28, 2011	Haleakala	Pan-STARRS 1	·	790 m	MPC · JPL
655941	2015 TF_{120}	—	August 18, 2009	Kitt Peak	Spacewatch	·	2.0 km	MPC · JPL
655942	2015 TR_{137}	—	January 31, 2006	Kitt Peak	Spacewatch	VER	2.1 km	MPC · JPL
655943	2015 TU_{139}	—	October 8, 2015	Haleakala	Pan-STARRS 1	H	350 m	MPC · JPL
655944	2015 TL_{142}	—	February 14, 2012	Haleakala	Pan-STARRS 1	·	1.4 km	MPC · JPL
655945	2015 TE_{146}	—	September 12, 2015	Haleakala	Pan-STARRS 1	3:2 · SHU	4.0 km	MPC · JPL
655946	2015 TG_{147}	—	October 7, 2004	Kitt Peak	Spacewatch	MAS	510 m	MPC · JPL
655947	2015 TG_{149}	—	September 11, 2015	Haleakala	Pan-STARRS 1	·	560 m	MPC · JPL
655948	2015 TO_{150}	—	July 23, 2015	Haleakala	Pan-STARRS 1	·	930 m	MPC · JPL
655949	2015 TO_{153}	—	October 9, 2004	Kitt Peak	Spacewatch	NYS	960 m	MPC · JPL
655950	2015 TQ_{155}	—	December 3, 2008	Mount Lemmon	Mount Lemmon Survey	NYS	1.1 km	MPC · JPL
655951	2015 TC_{157}	—	October 5, 2002	Kitt Peak	Spacewatch	·	1.3 km	MPC · JPL
655952	2015 TH_{159}	—	October 8, 2004	Kitt Peak	Spacewatch	·	960 m	MPC · JPL
655953	2015 TS_{161}	—	September 12, 2015	Haleakala	Pan-STARRS 1	NYS	780 m	MPC · JPL
655954	2015 TJ_{165}	—	January 2, 2009	Mount Lemmon	Mount Lemmon Survey	MAS	610 m	MPC · JPL
655955	2015 TT_{168}	—	April 8, 2003	Kitt Peak	Spacewatch	NYS	1.1 km	MPC · JPL
655956	2015 TP_{170}	—	April 30, 2014	Haleakala	Pan-STARRS 1	·	1.0 km	MPC · JPL
655957	2015 TR_{172}	—	April 29, 2014	Haleakala	Pan-STARRS 1	V	460 m	MPC · JPL
655958	2015 TK_{173}	—	September 26, 2011	Haleakala	Pan-STARRS 1	·	880 m	MPC · JPL
655959	2015 TS_{177}	—	December 28, 2005	Palomar	NEAT	TIR	2.8 km	MPC · JPL
655960	2015 TC_{184}	—	October 23, 2011	Haleakala	Pan-STARRS 1	·	760 m	MPC · JPL
655961	2015 TQ_{185}	—	August 22, 2014	Haleakala	Pan-STARRS 1	·	3.0 km	MPC · JPL
655962	2015 TR_{188}	—	August 31, 2011	Siding Spring	SSS	·	1.4 km	MPC · JPL
655963	2015 TD_{190}	—	August 19, 2011	La Sagra	OAM	·	1.3 km	MPC · JPL
655964	2015 TM_{192}	—	July 23, 2015	Haleakala	Pan-STARRS 1	·	860 m	MPC · JPL
655965	2015 TA_{193}	—	October 18, 2001	Palomar	NEAT	·	1.7 km	MPC · JPL
655966	2015 TR_{195}	—	September 24, 2015	Catalina	CSS	·	1.1 km	MPC · JPL
655967	2015 TG_{196}	—	September 5, 2007	Siding Spring	K. Sárneczky, L. Kiss	T_{j} (2.92)	3.9 km	MPC · JPL
655968	2015 TA_{199}	—	September 2, 2011	Mayhill-ISON	L. Elenin	MAS	720 m	MPC · JPL
655969	2015 TG_{199}	—	November 10, 2004	Kitt Peak	Spacewatch	MAS	670 m	MPC · JPL
655970	2015 TR_{200}	—	September 8, 2004	Socorro	LINEAR	MAS	580 m	MPC · JPL
655971	2015 TH_{201}	—	July 31, 2009	Siding Spring	SSS	·	3.3 km	MPC · JPL
655972	2015 TD_{202}	—	April 26, 2001	Kitt Peak	Spacewatch	·	1.7 km	MPC · JPL
655973	2015 TB_{206}	—	October 12, 2015	Mount Lemmon	Mount Lemmon Survey	H	520 m	MPC · JPL
655974	2015 TK_{211}	—	February 23, 2007	Kitt Peak	Spacewatch	·	580 m	MPC · JPL
655975	2015 TR_{213}	—	October 9, 2008	Kitt Peak	Spacewatch	·	740 m	MPC · JPL
655976	2015 TC_{214}	—	April 29, 2014	Haleakala	Pan-STARRS 1	·	980 m	MPC · JPL
655977	2015 TE_{215}	—	October 24, 2011	Haleakala	Pan-STARRS 1	·	1.6 km	MPC · JPL
655978	2015 TR_{218}	—	October 8, 2004	Kitt Peak	Spacewatch	NYS	860 m	MPC · JPL
655979	2015 TQ_{221}	—	August 15, 2009	Kitt Peak	Spacewatch	·	2.5 km	MPC · JPL
655980	2015 TV_{226}	—	March 5, 2013	Haleakala	Pan-STARRS 1	·	3.6 km	MPC · JPL
655981	2015 TS_{232}	—	October 9, 2004	Kitt Peak	Spacewatch	NYS	800 m	MPC · JPL
655982	2015 TA_{235}	—	September 9, 2015	Haleakala	Pan-STARRS 1	·	870 m	MPC · JPL
655983	2015 TF_{238}	—	September 6, 2008	Catalina	CSS	·	1.6 km	MPC · JPL
655984	2015 TB_{241}	—	October 18, 2011	Piszkés-tető	K. Sárneczky, A. Szing	·	980 m	MPC · JPL
655985	2015 TQ_{249}	—	October 7, 2004	Kitt Peak	Spacewatch	NYS	1.0 km	MPC · JPL
655986	2015 TU_{249}	—	September 9, 2015	Haleakala	Pan-STARRS 1	·	1.0 km	MPC · JPL
655987	2015 TD_{250}	—	October 13, 2004	Kitt Peak	Spacewatch	NYS	1.2 km	MPC · JPL
655988	2015 TA_{253}	—	September 9, 2015	Haleakala	Pan-STARRS 1	·	840 m	MPC · JPL
655989	2015 TC_{256}	—	September 17, 2006	Catalina	CSS	·	1.6 km	MPC · JPL
655990	2015 TU_{256}	—	January 13, 2008	Catalina	CSS	·	1.3 km	MPC · JPL
655991	2015 TA_{257}	—	October 11, 2015	ESA OGS	ESA OGS	CLA	1.4 km	MPC · JPL
655992	2015 TX_{261}	—	October 12, 2015	Haleakala	Pan-STARRS 1	·	3.0 km	MPC · JPL
655993	2015 TP_{262}	—	November 3, 2007	Mount Lemmon	Mount Lemmon Survey	·	1.7 km	MPC · JPL
655994	2015 TK_{269}	—	January 17, 1999	Kitt Peak	Spacewatch	V	510 m	MPC · JPL
655995	2015 TE_{278}	—	July 25, 2014	Haleakala	Pan-STARRS 1	3:2	4.2 km	MPC · JPL
655996	2015 TG_{284}	—	February 26, 2014	Haleakala	Pan-STARRS 1	·	630 m	MPC · JPL
655997	2015 TQ_{292}	—	September 20, 2015	Catalina	CSS	·	1 km	MPC · JPL
655998	2015 TS_{300}	—	May 8, 2014	Haleakala	Pan-STARRS 1	·	2.7 km	MPC · JPL
655999	2015 TK_{301}	—	October 12, 2015	Haleakala	Pan-STARRS 1	·	550 m	MPC · JPL
656000	2015 TP_{301}	—	February 25, 2012	Mount Lemmon	Mount Lemmon Survey	·	1.6 km	MPC · JPL

back to top
