= List of minor planets: 680001–681000 =

The following is a partial list of minor planets, running from minor-planet number 680001 through 681000, inclusive. The primary data for this and other partial lists is based on JPL's "Small-Body Orbital Elements" and data available from the Minor Planet Center. Critical list information is also provided by the MPC, unless otherwise specified from Lowell Observatory. A detailed description of the table's columns and additional sources are given on the main page including a complete list of every page in this series, and a statistical break-up on the dynamical classification of minor planets.

Also see the summary list of all named bodies in numerical and alphabetical order, and the corresponding naming citations for the number range of this particular list. New namings may only be added to this list after official publication, as the preannouncement of names is condemned by the Working Group for Small Bodies Nomenclature of the International Astronomical Union.

Near-Earth obj.	MBA (inner)	MBA (outer)	Centaur
Mars-crosser	MBA (middle)	Jupiter trojan	Trans-Neptunian obj.
Unclassified

== 680001–680100 ==
Designation			Discovery			Properties		Ref
Permanent	Provisional	Named after	Date	Site	Discoverer(s)	Category	Diam.	Ref
680001	1994 UG_{13}	—	October 2, 2013	Haleakala	Pan-STARRS 1	·	1.1 km	MPC · JPL
680002	1994 VA_{9}	—	November 6, 1994	Kitt Peak	Spacewatch	·	2.3 km	MPC · JPL
680003	1994 XX_{3}	—	December 3, 1994	Kitt Peak	Spacewatch	·	1.7 km	MPC · JPL
680004	1995 CE_{11}	—	February 16, 2012	Haleakala	Pan-STARRS 1	·	700 m	MPC · JPL
680005	1995 QF_{14}	—	August 27, 1995	Kitt Peak	Spacewatch	·	1.5 km	MPC · JPL
680006	1995 SL_{7}	—	September 17, 1995	Kitt Peak	Spacewatch	·	1.2 km	MPC · JPL
680007	1995 SX_{33}	—	September 22, 1995	Kitt Peak	Spacewatch	·	420 m	MPC · JPL
680008	1995 SO_{35}	—	September 23, 1995	Kitt Peak	Spacewatch	·	1.5 km	MPC · JPL
680009	1995 SV_{55}	—	September 18, 1995	Kitt Peak	Spacewatch	·	1.3 km	MPC · JPL
680010	1995 SV_{58}	—	September 24, 1995	Kitt Peak	Spacewatch	·	660 m	MPC · JPL
680011	1995 SW_{71}	—	September 19, 1995	Kitt Peak	Spacewatch	·	940 m	MPC · JPL
680012	1995 SS_{77}	—	September 30, 1995	Kitt Peak	Spacewatch	·	1.4 km	MPC · JPL
680013	1995 SM_{83}	—	September 24, 1995	Kitt Peak	Spacewatch	·	560 m	MPC · JPL
680014	1995 SF_{86}	—	September 26, 1995	Kitt Peak	Spacewatch	·	1.1 km	MPC · JPL
680015	1995 TQ_{11}	—	October 15, 1995	Kitt Peak	Spacewatch	·	1.2 km	MPC · JPL
680016	1995 UJ_{28}	—	October 20, 1995	Kitt Peak	Spacewatch	·	840 m	MPC · JPL
680017	1995 UA_{69}	—	October 19, 1995	Kitt Peak	Spacewatch	·	1.0 km	MPC · JPL
680018	1995 UF_{69}	—	October 19, 1995	Kitt Peak	Spacewatch	·	1.4 km	MPC · JPL
680019	1995 UT_{72}	—	October 20, 1995	Kitt Peak	Spacewatch	(17392)	1.2 km	MPC · JPL
680020	1995 UG_{76}	—	October 21, 1995	Kitt Peak	Spacewatch	·	570 m	MPC · JPL
680021	1995 UB_{78}	—	October 23, 1995	Kitt Peak	Spacewatch	·	790 m	MPC · JPL
680022	1995 UH_{84}	—	October 24, 1995	Kitt Peak	Spacewatch	NEM	1.6 km	MPC · JPL
680023	1995 VP_{6}	—	November 14, 1995	Kitt Peak	Spacewatch	·	1.9 km	MPC · JPL
680024	1996 BC_{6}	—	January 12, 1996	Kitt Peak	Spacewatch	HNS	1.3 km	MPC · JPL
680025	1996 BD_{8}	—	January 19, 1996	Kitt Peak	Spacewatch	·	2.2 km	MPC · JPL
680026	1996 EG_{7}	—	March 11, 1996	Kitt Peak	Spacewatch	·	1.7 km	MPC · JPL
680027	1996 RZ_{13}	—	September 8, 1996	Kitt Peak	Spacewatch	·	950 m	MPC · JPL
680028	1996 RR_{16}	—	September 13, 1996	Kitt Peak	Spacewatch	·	2.9 km	MPC · JPL
680029	1996 RY_{18}	—	September 15, 1996	Kitt Peak	Spacewatch	THM	2.3 km	MPC · JPL
680030	1996 RP_{20}	—	September 15, 1996	Kitt Peak	Spacewatch	·	800 m	MPC · JPL
680031	1996 VH_{27}	—	November 11, 1996	Kitt Peak	Spacewatch	·	970 m	MPC · JPL
680032	1996 VX_{28}	—	November 7, 1996	Kitt Peak	Spacewatch	·	1.3 km	MPC · JPL
680033	1996 VV_{32}	—	November 5, 1996	Kitt Peak	Spacewatch	·	650 m	MPC · JPL
680034	1996 VR_{36}	—	November 10, 1996	Kitt Peak	Spacewatch	(5)	1.1 km	MPC · JPL
680035	1996 WZ_{3}	—	February 23, 2015	Haleakala	Pan-STARRS 1	EUN	1.3 km	MPC · JPL
680036	1997 CH	—	February 1, 1997	Kitt Peak	Spacewatch	NYS	1.2 km	MPC · JPL
680037	1997 EM_{1}	—	March 3, 1997	Kitt Peak	Spacewatch	·	1.1 km	MPC · JPL
680038	1997 EN_{6}	—	March 2, 1997	Kitt Peak	Spacewatch	·	570 m	MPC · JPL
680039	1997 EL_{60}	—	February 23, 2012	Mount Lemmon	Mount Lemmon Survey	·	1.0 km	MPC · JPL
680040	1997 GH_{2}	—	April 7, 1997	Kitt Peak	Spacewatch	·	1.5 km	MPC · JPL
680041	1997 NL_{2}	—	July 3, 1997	Kitt Peak	Spacewatch	LIX	2.5 km	MPC · JPL
680042	1997 PR_{6}	—	May 6, 2014	Haleakala	Pan-STARRS 1	V	510 m	MPC · JPL
680043	1997 SS_{32}	—	September 28, 1997	Kitt Peak	Spacewatch	·	1.7 km	MPC · JPL
680044	1997 SX_{35}	—	March 24, 2003	Kitt Peak	Spacewatch	·	970 m	MPC · JPL
680045	1997 SZ_{35}	—	September 11, 2007	Mount Lemmon	Mount Lemmon Survey	·	1.9 km	MPC · JPL
680046	1997 UK_{6}	—	October 23, 1997	Kitt Peak	Spacewatch	·	1.6 km	MPC · JPL
680047	1997 US_{11}	—	October 21, 1997	Kitt Peak	Spacewatch	·	820 m	MPC · JPL
680048	1998 AZ_{11}	—	February 1, 2009	Kitt Peak	Spacewatch	·	830 m	MPC · JPL
680049	1998 BK_{18}	—	January 23, 1998	Kitt Peak	Spacewatch	·	830 m	MPC · JPL
680050	1998 BM_{18}	—	October 26, 2009	Kitt Peak	Spacewatch	·	1.2 km	MPC · JPL
680051	1998 BV_{23}	—	January 26, 1998	Kitt Peak	Spacewatch	·	1.2 km	MPC · JPL
680052	1998 BM_{50}	—	October 3, 2010	Catalina	CSS	·	630 m	MPC · JPL
680053	1998 DH_{25}	—	February 23, 1998	Kitt Peak	Spacewatch	·	460 m	MPC · JPL
680054	1998 DL_{25}	—	February 23, 1998	Kitt Peak	Spacewatch	KOR	1.2 km	MPC · JPL
680055	1998 EU_{22}	—	April 13, 2013	Haleakala	Pan-STARRS 1	MAS	660 m	MPC · JPL
680056	1998 OU_{15}	—	June 27, 2014	Haleakala	Pan-STARRS 1	·	2.4 km	MPC · JPL
680057	1998 QN_{56}	—	August 26, 1998	Kitt Peak	Spacewatch	NYS	880 m	MPC · JPL
680058	1998 RZ_{10}	—	September 13, 1998	Kitt Peak	Spacewatch	·	1.4 km	MPC · JPL
680059	1998 RM_{81}	—	September 2, 1998	Kitt Peak	Spacewatch	·	1.1 km	MPC · JPL
680060	1998 SC_{30}	—	September 19, 1998	Kitt Peak	Spacewatch	MAS	630 m	MPC · JPL
680061	1998 SA_{178}	—	October 3, 2006	Mount Lemmon	Mount Lemmon Survey	·	1.1 km	MPC · JPL
680062	1998 SB_{178}	—	September 19, 1998	Apache Point	SDSS Collaboration	EOS	1.6 km	MPC · JPL
680063	1998 SE_{178}	—	April 9, 2010	Kitt Peak	Spacewatch	·	1.4 km	MPC · JPL
680064	1998 SG_{178}	—	August 10, 2007	Kitt Peak	Spacewatch	·	1.6 km	MPC · JPL
680065	1998 SL_{178}	—	July 14, 2013	Haleakala	Pan-STARRS 1	MAS	660 m	MPC · JPL
680066	1998 SV_{179}	—	February 5, 2016	Haleakala	Pan-STARRS 1	·	1.1 km	MPC · JPL
680067	1998 SB_{180}	—	February 12, 2011	Mount Lemmon	Mount Lemmon Survey	·	2.6 km	MPC · JPL
680068	1998 SJ_{180}	—	October 10, 2015	Kitt Peak	Spacewatch	·	2.8 km	MPC · JPL
680069	1998 SQ_{180}	—	March 3, 2009	Mount Lemmon	Mount Lemmon Survey	·	1.4 km	MPC · JPL
680070	1998 SY_{181}	—	September 19, 1998	Apache Point	SDSS Collaboration	AGN	800 m	MPC · JPL
680071	1998 TB_{9}	—	October 12, 1998	Kitt Peak	Spacewatch	·	2.4 km	MPC · JPL
680072	1998 WG_{28}	—	November 18, 1998	Kitt Peak	Spacewatch	·	2.6 km	MPC · JPL
680073	1998 WE_{35}	—	November 18, 1998	Kitt Peak	Spacewatch	·	1.9 km	MPC · JPL
680074	1998 WS_{46}	—	September 25, 2008	Kitt Peak	Spacewatch	·	560 m	MPC · JPL
680075	1999 CU_{138}	—	February 7, 1999	Kitt Peak	Spacewatch	·	1.6 km	MPC · JPL
680076	1999 CN_{160}	—	February 20, 2006	Kitt Peak	Spacewatch	·	790 m	MPC · JPL
680077	1999 EN_{11}	—	March 10, 1999	Kitt Peak	Spacewatch	·	1.1 km	MPC · JPL
680078	1999 FN_{98}	—	September 14, 2007	Mount Lemmon	Mount Lemmon Survey	(1118)	2.5 km	MPC · JPL
680079	1999 FZ_{98}	—	November 30, 2008	Mount Lemmon	Mount Lemmon Survey	NYS	720 m	MPC · JPL
680080	1999 FG_{99}	—	February 9, 2011	Mount Lemmon	Mount Lemmon Survey	(194)	1.2 km	MPC · JPL
680081	1999 FV_{100}	—	October 1, 2005	Socorro	LINEAR	EUN	1.1 km	MPC · JPL
680082	1999 GU_{14}	—	April 14, 1999	Kitt Peak	Spacewatch	·	630 m	MPC · JPL
680083	1999 LW_{29}	—	June 10, 1999	Kitt Peak	Spacewatch	·	1.1 km	MPC · JPL
680084	1999 PQ_{5}	—	August 12, 1999	Kitt Peak	Spacewatch	·	1.4 km	MPC · JPL
680085	1999 PL_{9}	—	August 12, 2012	Mount Bigelow	CSS	·	1.7 km	MPC · JPL
680086	1999 PM_{9}	—	November 30, 2008	Kitt Peak	Spacewatch	(5)	880 m	MPC · JPL
680087	1999 RK_{170}	—	September 14, 1999	Kitt Peak	Spacewatch	·	820 m	MPC · JPL
680088	1999 RX_{259}	—	September 5, 1999	Kitt Peak	Spacewatch	·	670 m	MPC · JPL
680089	1999 RA_{260}	—	December 6, 2013	Haleakala	Pan-STARRS 1	·	1.5 km	MPC · JPL
680090	1999 RR_{260}	—	March 18, 2015	Haleakala	Pan-STARRS 1	·	1.1 km	MPC · JPL
680091	1999 RU_{260}	—	November 2, 2010	Mount Lemmon	Mount Lemmon Survey	·	1.7 km	MPC · JPL
680092	1999 SE_{23}	—	September 30, 1999	Kitt Peak	Spacewatch	·	1.6 km	MPC · JPL
680093	1999 SY_{28}	—	September 18, 1999	Kitt Peak	Spacewatch	·	910 m	MPC · JPL
680094	1999 TE_{21}	—	September 14, 1999	Siding Spring	R. H. McNaught	H	480 m	MPC · JPL
680095	1999 TU_{73}	—	October 2, 1999	Kitt Peak	Spacewatch	·	2.4 km	MPC · JPL
680096	1999 TQ_{74}	—	October 10, 1999	Kitt Peak	Spacewatch	·	2.5 km	MPC · JPL
680097	1999 TM_{78}	—	October 11, 1999	Kitt Peak	Spacewatch	EOS	1.4 km	MPC · JPL
680098	1999 TR_{233}	—	September 26, 2003	Apache Point	SDSS Collaboration	·	960 m	MPC · JPL
680099	1999 TD_{263}	—	October 15, 1999	Kitt Peak	Spacewatch	KON	2.1 km	MPC · JPL
680100	1999 TN_{303}	—	October 4, 1999	Kitt Peak	Spacewatch	·	1.8 km	MPC · JPL

== 680101–680200 ==
back to top

Designation			Discovery			Properties		Ref
Permanent	Provisional	Named after	Date	Site	Discoverer(s)	Category	Diam.	Ref
680101	1999 TA_{304}	—	October 4, 1999	Kitt Peak	Spacewatch	EOS	1.4 km	MPC · JPL
680102	1999 TB_{309}	—	October 6, 1999	Socorro	LINEAR	EOS	1.8 km	MPC · JPL
680103	1999 TX_{309}	—	October 3, 1999	Kitt Peak	Spacewatch	NYS	900 m	MPC · JPL
680104	1999 TB_{317}	—	October 11, 1999	Kitt Peak	Spacewatch	·	1.5 km	MPC · JPL
680105	1999 TR_{336}	—	October 20, 1999	Kitt Peak	Spacewatch	·	2.3 km	MPC · JPL
680106	1999 TJ_{337}	—	March 11, 2005	Kitt Peak	Spacewatch	·	1.0 km	MPC · JPL
680107	1999 TQ_{337}	—	September 26, 2006	Mount Lemmon	Mount Lemmon Survey	(2076)	680 m	MPC · JPL
680108	1999 TH_{338}	—	March 22, 2015	Haleakala	Pan-STARRS 1	·	1.4 km	MPC · JPL
680109	1999 TL_{338}	—	October 4, 1999	Kitt Peak	Spacewatch	·	900 m	MPC · JPL
680110	1999 TM_{338}	—	October 24, 2013	Kitt Peak	Spacewatch	HOF	2.2 km	MPC · JPL
680111	1999 TT_{338}	—	October 17, 2010	Mount Lemmon	Mount Lemmon Survey	·	950 m	MPC · JPL
680112	1999 TS_{340}	—	August 13, 2004	Cerro Tololo	Deep Ecliptic Survey	(31811)	2.4 km	MPC · JPL
680113	1999 TJ_{341}	—	December 11, 2013	Haleakala	Pan-STARRS 1	·	1.2 km	MPC · JPL
680114	1999 TL_{341}	—	February 11, 2018	Haleakala	Pan-STARRS 1	EOS	1.4 km	MPC · JPL
680115	1999 TR_{341}	—	August 8, 2016	Haleakala	Pan-STARRS 1	·	1.5 km	MPC · JPL
680116	1999 TZ_{341}	—	September 24, 2008	Kitt Peak	Spacewatch	·	1.4 km	MPC · JPL
680117	1999 TD_{342}	—	January 23, 2014	Kitt Peak	Spacewatch	·	1.4 km	MPC · JPL
680118	1999 TO_{342}	—	February 27, 2015	Haleakala	Pan-STARRS 1	·	1.3 km	MPC · JPL
680119	1999 TR_{342}	—	October 13, 1999	Kitt Peak	Spacewatch	EOS	1.6 km	MPC · JPL
680120	1999 UU_{31}	—	October 20, 1999	Kitt Peak	Spacewatch	·	900 m	MPC · JPL
680121	1999 UP_{40}	—	October 16, 1999	Kitt Peak	Spacewatch	EOS	1.5 km	MPC · JPL
680122	1999 UH_{57}	—	October 29, 1999	Kitt Peak	Spacewatch	NYS	1.1 km	MPC · JPL
680123	1999 UC_{58}	—	October 10, 1999	Kitt Peak	Spacewatch	·	950 m	MPC · JPL
680124	1999 UC_{66}	—	September 30, 2010	Mount Lemmon	Mount Lemmon Survey	·	2.4 km	MPC · JPL
680125	1999 UF_{66}	—	September 17, 2010	Mount Lemmon	Mount Lemmon Survey	·	920 m	MPC · JPL
680126	1999 UL_{66}	—	December 26, 2006	Kitt Peak	Spacewatch	·	560 m	MPC · JPL
680127	1999 VS_{121}	—	November 4, 1999	Kitt Peak	Spacewatch	·	520 m	MPC · JPL
680128	1999 VB_{128}	—	November 9, 1999	Kitt Peak	Spacewatch	EOS	1.4 km	MPC · JPL
680129	1999 VK_{141}	—	November 10, 1999	Kitt Peak	Spacewatch	·	2.1 km	MPC · JPL
680130	1999 VA_{152}	—	October 2, 2006	Mount Lemmon	Mount Lemmon Survey	·	870 m	MPC · JPL
680131	1999 VY_{217}	—	November 5, 1999	Kitt Peak	Spacewatch	·	2.3 km	MPC · JPL
680132	1999 VE_{226}	—	November 12, 1999	Socorro	LINEAR	·	2.5 km	MPC · JPL
680133	1999 WE_{28}	—	May 28, 2008	Mount Lemmon	Mount Lemmon Survey	·	480 m	MPC · JPL
680134	1999 WG_{28}	—	March 11, 2011	Kitt Peak	Spacewatch	·	620 m	MPC · JPL
680135	1999 WK_{28}	—	January 19, 2012	Kitt Peak	Spacewatch	·	1.0 km	MPC · JPL
680136	1999 WD_{29}	—	December 18, 2007	Mount Lemmon	Mount Lemmon Survey	·	810 m	MPC · JPL
680137	1999 XB_{152}	—	December 8, 1999	Kitt Peak	Spacewatch	·	2.9 km	MPC · JPL
680138	1999 XL_{224}	—	December 13, 1999	Kitt Peak	Spacewatch	·	1.8 km	MPC · JPL
680139	1999 XZ_{254}	—	December 12, 1999	Kitt Peak	Spacewatch	·	1.7 km	MPC · JPL
680140	1999 XV_{264}	—	November 29, 1999	Kitt Peak	Spacewatch	·	480 m	MPC · JPL
680141	1999 XZ_{265}	—	September 17, 1995	Kitt Peak	Spacewatch	MAS	550 m	MPC · JPL
680142	1999 XC_{266}	—	March 1, 2016	Mount Lemmon	Mount Lemmon Survey	H	350 m	MPC · JPL
680143	1999 XJ_{266}	—	October 26, 2016	Haleakala	Pan-STARRS 1	·	2.5 km	MPC · JPL
680144	1999 XK_{266}	—	September 21, 2009	Kitt Peak	Spacewatch	·	1.7 km	MPC · JPL
680145	1999 XP_{266}	—	October 3, 2003	Kitt Peak	Spacewatch	·	1.5 km	MPC · JPL
680146	1999 XU_{266}	—	September 29, 2010	Mount Lemmon	Mount Lemmon Survey	·	990 m	MPC · JPL
680147	1999 XV_{266}	—	May 20, 2014	Haleakala	Pan-STARRS 1	·	580 m	MPC · JPL
680148	1999 YM_{2}	—	December 16, 1999	Kitt Peak	Spacewatch	·	1.7 km	MPC · JPL
680149	1999 YP_{7}	—	December 27, 1999	Kitt Peak	Spacewatch	EOS	1.6 km	MPC · JPL
680150	1999 YX_{29}	—	October 30, 2013	Haleakala	Pan-STARRS 1	·	950 m	MPC · JPL
680151	1999 YA_{30}	—	December 1, 2008	Kitt Peak	Spacewatch	·	1.6 km	MPC · JPL
680152	1999 YC_{30}	—	December 16, 1999	Kitt Peak	Spacewatch	·	1.8 km	MPC · JPL
680153	1999 YO_{30}	—	October 13, 2010	Mount Lemmon	Mount Lemmon Survey	L4	7.7 km	MPC · JPL
680154	2000 AV_{226}	—	January 3, 2000	Kitt Peak	Spacewatch	·	730 m	MPC · JPL
680155	2000 AV_{258}	—	October 1, 2014	Haleakala	Pan-STARRS 1	·	1.8 km	MPC · JPL
680156	2000 BR_{36}	—	January 28, 2000	Kitt Peak	Spacewatch	·	560 m	MPC · JPL
680157	2000 BN_{42}	—	January 27, 2000	Kitt Peak	Spacewatch	·	1.6 km	MPC · JPL
680158	2000 BA_{43}	—	January 28, 2000	Kitt Peak	Spacewatch	·	1 km	MPC · JPL
680159	2000 BY_{45}	—	January 28, 2000	Kitt Peak	Spacewatch	THM	2.1 km	MPC · JPL
680160	2000 BX_{52}	—	March 17, 2005	Mount Lemmon	Mount Lemmon Survey	MRX	850 m	MPC · JPL
680161	2000 BZ_{52}	—	November 24, 2014	Mount Lemmon	Mount Lemmon Survey	·	1.5 km	MPC · JPL
680162	2000 CK_{107}	—	February 7, 2000	Kitt Peak	Spacewatch	·	1.2 km	MPC · JPL
680163	2000 CT_{127}	—	February 2, 2000	Kitt Peak	Spacewatch	·	3.2 km	MPC · JPL
680164	2000 CC_{138}	—	February 4, 2000	Kitt Peak	Spacewatch	·	2.4 km	MPC · JPL
680165	2000 CT_{143}	—	February 4, 2000	Kitt Peak	Spacewatch	·	1.4 km	MPC · JPL
680166	2000 CD_{144}	—	February 5, 2000	Kitt Peak	Spacewatch	·	1.0 km	MPC · JPL
680167	2000 CE_{151}	—	March 11, 2005	Mount Lemmon	Mount Lemmon Survey	AGN	1.0 km	MPC · JPL
680168	2000 CW_{151}	—	January 29, 2011	Kitt Peak	Spacewatch	·	780 m	MPC · JPL
680169	2000 CX_{152}	—	June 3, 2011	Mount Lemmon	Mount Lemmon Survey	·	540 m	MPC · JPL
680170	2000 CP_{153}	—	July 13, 2013	Haleakala	Pan-STARRS 1	THM	1.9 km	MPC · JPL
680171	2000 CX_{153}	—	February 7, 2011	Mount Lemmon	Mount Lemmon Survey	·	2.3 km	MPC · JPL
680172	2000 CT_{156}	—	September 18, 2007	Kitt Peak	Spacewatch	PAD	1.4 km	MPC · JPL
680173	2000 DP_{118}	—	February 25, 2011	Mount Lemmon	Mount Lemmon Survey	·	2.1 km	MPC · JPL
680174	2000 EU_{98}	—	March 10, 2000	Kitt Peak	Spacewatch	·	470 m	MPC · JPL
680175	2000 EQ_{177}	—	March 3, 2000	Kitt Peak	Spacewatch	·	1.9 km	MPC · JPL
680176	2000 EE_{204}	—	March 6, 2000	Cerro Tololo	Deep Lens Survey	·	2.5 km	MPC · JPL
680177	2000 EL_{209}	—	November 4, 2007	Kitt Peak	Spacewatch	AGN	1.2 km	MPC · JPL
680178	2000 EP_{209}	—	April 27, 2009	Mount Lemmon	Mount Lemmon Survey	·	1.2 km	MPC · JPL
680179	2000 ET_{209}	—	September 5, 2013	Kitt Peak	Spacewatch	EOS	1.5 km	MPC · JPL
680180	2000 EK_{210}	—	March 5, 2016	Haleakala	Pan-STARRS 1	·	1.3 km	MPC · JPL
680181	2000 EU_{210}	—	March 5, 2011	Mount Lemmon	Mount Lemmon Survey	·	2.4 km	MPC · JPL
680182	2000 EC_{211}	—	December 4, 2008	Mount Lemmon	Mount Lemmon Survey	·	1.4 km	MPC · JPL
680183	2000 GN_{129}	—	April 5, 2000	Kitt Peak	Spacewatch	MAS	710 m	MPC · JPL
680184	2000 GC_{150}	—	April 5, 2000	Socorro	LINEAR	·	1.1 km	MPC · JPL
680185	2000 GH_{182}	—	April 2, 2000	Kitt Peak	Spacewatch	·	2.5 km	MPC · JPL
680186	2000 GZ_{182}	—	April 2, 2000	Kitt Peak	Spacewatch	·	2.6 km	MPC · JPL
680187	2000 GG_{184}	—	March 13, 2011	Kitt Peak	Spacewatch	·	2.8 km	MPC · JPL
680188	2000 GK_{188}	—	May 9, 2006	Mount Lemmon	Mount Lemmon Survey	URS	2.6 km	MPC · JPL
680189	2000 HT_{100}	—	April 25, 2000	Kitt Peak	Spacewatch	NYS	1.1 km	MPC · JPL
680190	2000 JQ_{95}	—	October 22, 2008	Kitt Peak	Spacewatch	·	2.9 km	MPC · JPL
680191	2000 JW_{95}	—	May 4, 2000	Apache Point	SDSS Collaboration	·	1.7 km	MPC · JPL
680192	2000 JQ_{96}	—	October 26, 2008	Mount Lemmon	Mount Lemmon Survey	URS	3.0 km	MPC · JPL
680193	2000 JT_{96}	—	September 26, 2011	Haleakala	Pan-STARRS 1	T_{j} (2.98) · 3:2	5.4 km	MPC · JPL
680194	2000 JA_{97}	—	November 26, 2014	Haleakala	Pan-STARRS 1	VER	2.5 km	MPC · JPL
680195	2000 JC_{97}	—	April 18, 2007	Mount Lemmon	Mount Lemmon Survey	·	530 m	MPC · JPL
680196	2000 JK_{97}	—	August 28, 2011	Siding Spring	SSS	·	630 m	MPC · JPL
680197	2000 KA_{45}	—	May 28, 2000	Kitt Peak	Spacewatch	·	630 m	MPC · JPL
680198	2000 OA_{63}	—	July 30, 2000	Cerro Tololo	Deep Ecliptic Survey	·	580 m	MPC · JPL
680199	2000 OC_{71}	—	September 27, 2011	Mount Lemmon	Mount Lemmon Survey	·	1.5 km	MPC · JPL
680200	2000 OJ_{71}	—	January 10, 2006	Mount Lemmon	Mount Lemmon Survey	·	730 m	MPC · JPL

== 680201–680300 ==
back to top

Designation			Discovery			Properties		Ref
Permanent	Provisional	Named after	Date	Site	Discoverer(s)	Category	Diam.	Ref
680201	2000 OT_{72}	—	September 25, 2017	Haleakala	Pan-STARRS 1	·	800 m	MPC · JPL
680202	2000 PF_{33}	—	May 12, 2012	Mount Lemmon	Mount Lemmon Survey	KON	1.8 km	MPC · JPL
680203	2000 QA_{220}	—	August 24, 2000	Socorro	LINEAR	·	1.2 km	MPC · JPL
680204	2000 QL_{240}	—	August 25, 2000	Cerro Tololo	Deep Ecliptic Survey	KOR	990 m	MPC · JPL
680205	2000 QW_{255}	—	January 16, 2008	Kitt Peak	Spacewatch	·	1.6 km	MPC · JPL
680206	2000 QF_{256}	—	March 4, 2006	Kitt Peak	Spacewatch	·	650 m	MPC · JPL
680207	2000 QU_{256}	—	July 1, 2011	Kitt Peak	Spacewatch	·	2.4 km	MPC · JPL
680208	2000 QB_{257}	—	January 17, 2013	Haleakala	Pan-STARRS 1	·	1.8 km	MPC · JPL
680209	2000 RD_{111}	—	January 23, 2015	Haleakala	Pan-STARRS 1	·	950 m	MPC · JPL
680210	2000 RB_{112}	—	September 25, 2016	Haleakala	Pan-STARRS 1	·	1.5 km	MPC · JPL
680211	2000 RH_{112}	—	September 12, 2016	Mount Lemmon	Mount Lemmon Survey	·	2.0 km	MPC · JPL
680212	2000 RK_{112}	—	April 16, 2013	Cerro Tololo-DECam	DECam	·	1.2 km	MPC · JPL
680213	2000 RP_{112}	—	February 12, 2012	Mount Lemmon	Mount Lemmon Survey	AGN	890 m	MPC · JPL
680214	2000 RZ_{112}	—	September 5, 2000	Kitt Peak	Spacewatch	(5)	1.1 km	MPC · JPL
680215	2000 RH_{113}	—	September 8, 2000	Kitt Peak	Spacewatch	MAR	740 m	MPC · JPL
680216	2000 SC_{34}	—	September 20, 2000	Haleakala	NEAT	·	1.0 km	MPC · JPL
680217	2000 SH_{57}	—	September 24, 2000	Socorro	LINEAR	·	940 m	MPC · JPL
680218	2000 SE_{156}	—	September 24, 2000	Socorro	LINEAR	·	1.2 km	MPC · JPL
680219	2000 SD_{245}	—	September 24, 2000	Socorro	LINEAR	·	890 m	MPC · JPL
680220	2000 SQ_{321}	—	September 28, 2000	Kitt Peak	Spacewatch	·	2.8 km	MPC · JPL
680221	2000 SG_{377}	—	December 30, 2005	Catalina	CSS	·	1.3 km	MPC · JPL
680222	2000 SX_{377}	—	February 12, 2002	Kitt Peak	Spacewatch	·	1.1 km	MPC · JPL
680223	2000 SM_{378}	—	October 24, 2011	Kitt Peak	Spacewatch	EOS	1.5 km	MPC · JPL
680224	2000 SN_{378}	—	April 1, 2011	Mount Lemmon	Mount Lemmon Survey	·	1.5 km	MPC · JPL
680225	2000 SY_{378}	—	July 5, 2003	Kitt Peak	Spacewatch	·	1.1 km	MPC · JPL
680226	2000 SM_{380}	—	April 11, 2016	Haleakala	Pan-STARRS 1	·	1.4 km	MPC · JPL
680227	2000 SN_{380}	—	October 25, 2013	Mount Lemmon	Mount Lemmon Survey	·	1.1 km	MPC · JPL
680228	2000 SB_{381}	—	November 9, 2013	Haleakala	Pan-STARRS 1	(5)	1.0 km	MPC · JPL
680229	2000 SJ_{381}	—	September 12, 2013	Mount Lemmon	Mount Lemmon Survey	·	1.1 km	MPC · JPL
680230	2000 SJ_{383}	—	December 8, 2005	Kitt Peak	Spacewatch	·	1.1 km	MPC · JPL
680231	2000 SN_{383}	—	January 29, 2015	Haleakala	Pan-STARRS 1	·	1.1 km	MPC · JPL
680232	2000 SR_{384}	—	February 28, 2008	Mount Lemmon	Mount Lemmon Survey	EOS	1.4 km	MPC · JPL
680233	2000 TA_{50}	—	October 2, 2000	Socorro	LINEAR	·	1.1 km	MPC · JPL
680234	2000 TM_{75}	—	September 26, 2011	Kitt Peak	Spacewatch	·	910 m	MPC · JPL
680235	2000 TC_{76}	—	September 23, 2011	Haleakala	Pan-STARRS 1	·	2.4 km	MPC · JPL
680236	2000 TF_{76}	—	March 26, 2007	Mount Lemmon	Mount Lemmon Survey	·	1.1 km	MPC · JPL
680237	2000 TG_{76}	—	November 8, 2013	Mount Lemmon	Mount Lemmon Survey	(5)	1.2 km	MPC · JPL
680238	2000 TO_{76}	—	January 23, 2006	Kitt Peak	Spacewatch	·	1.3 km	MPC · JPL
680239	2000 TV_{76}	—	October 24, 2013	Mount Lemmon	Mount Lemmon Survey	·	990 m	MPC · JPL
680240	2000 TH_{78}	—	October 31, 2013	Kitt Peak	Spacewatch	·	1.0 km	MPC · JPL
680241	2000 TN_{78}	—	August 26, 2000	Cerro Tololo	Deep Ecliptic Survey	·	850 m	MPC · JPL
680242	2000 TO_{78}	—	March 20, 2007	Kitt Peak	Spacewatch	·	1.3 km	MPC · JPL
680243	2000 TK_{80}	—	August 9, 2008	La Sagra	OAM	·	1.1 km	MPC · JPL
680244	2000 UC_{31}	—	September 29, 2000	Kitt Peak	Spacewatch	·	1.0 km	MPC · JPL
680245	2000 UD_{74}	—	October 27, 2000	Socorro	LINEAR	·	1.4 km	MPC · JPL
680246	2000 UN_{115}	—	October 29, 2000	Kitt Peak	Spacewatch	·	1.6 km	MPC · JPL
680247	2000 US_{115}	—	November 26, 2013	Mount Lemmon	Mount Lemmon Survey	·	1.1 km	MPC · JPL
680248	2000 VO_{65}	—	November 1, 2000	Kitt Peak	Spacewatch	·	930 m	MPC · JPL
680249	2000 VR_{65}	—	November 1, 2000	Kitt Peak	Spacewatch	·	2.0 km	MPC · JPL
680250	2000 VE_{66}	—	November 28, 2013	Mount Lemmon	Mount Lemmon Survey	·	1.1 km	MPC · JPL
680251	2000 WS_{19}	—	November 19, 2000	Kitt Peak	Spacewatch	·	1.1 km	MPC · JPL
680252	2000 WH_{29}	—	November 20, 2000	Socorro	LINEAR	·	1.7 km	MPC · JPL
680253	2000 WT_{63}	—	November 24, 2000	Kitt Peak	Spacewatch	MAR	860 m	MPC · JPL
680254	2000 WF_{148}	—	November 29, 2000	Kitt Peak	Spacewatch	·	2.1 km	MPC · JPL
680255	2000 WX_{200}	—	October 20, 2011	Mount Lemmon	Mount Lemmon Survey	NYS	680 m	MPC · JPL
680256	2000 WY_{200}	—	August 19, 2014	Haleakala	Pan-STARRS 1	·	860 m	MPC · JPL
680257	2000 WF_{202}	—	November 19, 2007	Kitt Peak	Spacewatch	·	480 m	MPC · JPL
680258	2000 WM_{202}	—	November 26, 2005	Kitt Peak	Spacewatch	KOR	1.3 km	MPC · JPL
680259	2000 WK_{203}	—	October 13, 2013	Calar Alto-CASADO	Proffe, G., Hellmich, S.	·	1.2 km	MPC · JPL
680260	2000 WM_{203}	—	March 12, 2002	Kitt Peak	Spacewatch	·	1.6 km	MPC · JPL
680261	2000 WJ_{204}	—	February 10, 2018	Mount Lemmon	Mount Lemmon Survey	·	1.8 km	MPC · JPL
680262	2000 WY_{204}	—	December 30, 2008	Kitt Peak	Spacewatch	·	880 m	MPC · JPL
680263	2000 WC_{205}	—	October 27, 2006	Kitt Peak	Spacewatch	·	3.2 km	MPC · JPL
680264	2000 XB_{56}	—	March 21, 2015	Haleakala	Pan-STARRS 1	·	1.3 km	MPC · JPL
680265	2000 YD_{20}	—	December 23, 2000	Kitt Peak	Spacewatch	·	1.9 km	MPC · JPL
680266	2000 YM_{22}	—	December 28, 2000	Kitt Peak	Spacewatch	·	1.4 km	MPC · JPL
680267	2000 YR_{145}	—	July 14, 2016	Haleakala	Pan-STARRS 1	·	1.9 km	MPC · JPL
680268	2000 YV_{145}	—	June 22, 2010	Mount Lemmon	Mount Lemmon Survey	NYS	900 m	MPC · JPL
680269	2000 YB_{146}	—	October 12, 2016	Haleakala	Pan-STARRS 1	·	2.2 km	MPC · JPL
680270	2001 AP_{54}	—	June 7, 2013	Catalina	CSS	T_{j} (2.99)	2.8 km	MPC · JPL
680271	2001 BZ_{83}	—	November 27, 2013	Haleakala	Pan-STARRS 1	·	1.4 km	MPC · JPL
680272	2001 BS_{84}	—	August 1, 2016	Haleakala	Pan-STARRS 1	H	400 m	MPC · JPL
680273	2001 CY_{50}	—	September 26, 2017	Haleakala	Pan-STARRS 1	·	1.3 km	MPC · JPL
680274	2001 DL_{1}	—	February 16, 2001	Kitt Peak	Spacewatch	·	1.9 km	MPC · JPL
680275	2001 DP_{77}	—	February 19, 2001	Kitt Peak	Spacewatch	·	2.4 km	MPC · JPL
680276	2001 DF_{86}	—	February 25, 2001	Cerro Tololo	Deep Lens Survey	VER	2.2 km	MPC · JPL
680277	2001 DG_{86}	—	February 25, 2001	Cerro Tololo	Deep Lens Survey	·	1.0 km	MPC · JPL
680278	2001 DQ_{112}	—	September 28, 2008	Mount Lemmon	Mount Lemmon Survey	·	1.5 km	MPC · JPL
680279	2001 DL_{113}	—	November 18, 2003	Kitt Peak	Spacewatch	·	1.4 km	MPC · JPL
680280	2001 DP_{114}	—	April 15, 2013	Haleakala	Pan-STARRS 1	·	2.4 km	MPC · JPL
680281	2001 DY_{114}	—	February 26, 2014	Mount Lemmon	Mount Lemmon Survey	·	470 m	MPC · JPL
680282	2001 DA_{115}	—	July 19, 2015	Haleakala	Pan-STARRS 1	TIR	2.3 km	MPC · JPL
680283	2001 DB_{115}	—	October 6, 2016	Haleakala	Pan-STARRS 1	·	2.4 km	MPC · JPL
680284	2001 DH_{116}	—	May 15, 2013	Haleakala	Pan-STARRS 1	·	1.9 km	MPC · JPL
680285	2001 DC_{117}	—	October 22, 2003	Kitt Peak	Spacewatch	·	1.7 km	MPC · JPL
680286	2001 DV_{117}	—	December 1, 2016	Mount Lemmon	Mount Lemmon Survey	·	2.4 km	MPC · JPL
680287	2001 DP_{118}	—	April 12, 1996	Kitt Peak	Spacewatch	THM	1.9 km	MPC · JPL
680288	2001 DG_{119}	—	September 20, 2009	Kitt Peak	Spacewatch	·	1.9 km	MPC · JPL
680289	2001 DJ_{119}	—	March 24, 2012	Mount Lemmon	Mount Lemmon Survey	·	1.7 km	MPC · JPL
680290	2001 DT_{119}	—	April 12, 2013	Haleakala	Pan-STARRS 1	·	2.4 km	MPC · JPL
680291	2001 FH_{180}	—	March 20, 2001	Kitt Peak	Spacewatch	·	1.9 km	MPC · JPL
680292	2001 FY_{198}	—	March 21, 2001	Kitt Peak	SKADS	·	1.2 km	MPC · JPL
680293	2001 FZ_{198}	—	March 26, 2001	Kitt Peak	Deep Ecliptic Survey	·	1.5 km	MPC · JPL
680294	2001 FP_{202}	—	September 29, 2003	Kitt Peak	Spacewatch	AGN	830 m	MPC · JPL
680295	2001 FN_{204}	—	March 21, 2001	Kitt Peak	SKADS	·	1.4 km	MPC · JPL
680296	2001 FG_{205}	—	March 21, 2001	Kitt Peak	SKADS	EOS	1.5 km	MPC · JPL
680297	2001 FE_{207}	—	March 21, 2001	Kitt Peak	Spacewatch	·	2.2 km	MPC · JPL
680298	2001 FQ_{208}	—	March 21, 2001	Kitt Peak	SKADS	·	1.3 km	MPC · JPL
680299	2001 FW_{215}	—	March 21, 2001	Kitt Peak	SKADS	·	2.2 km	MPC · JPL
680300	2001 FK_{217}	—	October 2, 1994	Kitt Peak	Spacewatch	(7744)	1.2 km	MPC · JPL

== 680301–680400 ==
back to top

Designation			Discovery			Properties		Ref
Permanent	Provisional	Named after	Date	Site	Discoverer(s)	Category	Diam.	Ref
680301	2001 FC_{218}	—	March 21, 2001	Kitt Peak	SKADS	·	1.4 km	MPC · JPL
680302	2001 FB_{221}	—	March 22, 2001	Kitt Peak	SKADS	·	1.4 km	MPC · JPL
680303	2001 FY_{224}	—	March 22, 2001	Kitt Peak	SKADS	·	2.2 km	MPC · JPL
680304	2001 FY_{230}	—	March 29, 2001	Kitt Peak	SKADS	·	1.4 km	MPC · JPL
680305	2001 FF_{232}	—	March 29, 2001	Kitt Peak	SKADS	·	2.1 km	MPC · JPL
680306	2001 FU_{243}	—	March 6, 2008	Mount Lemmon	Mount Lemmon Survey	·	1.1 km	MPC · JPL
680307	2001 FZ_{243}	—	September 30, 2006	Mount Lemmon	Mount Lemmon Survey	·	1.1 km	MPC · JPL
680308	2001 FL_{244}	—	October 9, 2007	Mount Lemmon	Mount Lemmon Survey	·	930 m	MPC · JPL
680309	2001 FP_{244}	—	March 16, 2012	Haleakala	Pan-STARRS 1	URS	2.9 km	MPC · JPL
680310	2001 FW_{244}	—	March 17, 2012	Mount Lemmon	Mount Lemmon Survey	·	2.3 km	MPC · JPL
680311	2001 FA_{245}	—	July 2, 2013	Haleakala	Pan-STARRS 1	EOS	2.0 km	MPC · JPL
680312	2001 FY_{247}	—	March 27, 2012	Mount Lemmon	Mount Lemmon Survey	·	2.2 km	MPC · JPL
680313	2001 FF_{248}	—	July 28, 2014	Haleakala	Pan-STARRS 1	·	2.2 km	MPC · JPL
680314	2001 HD_{17}	—	April 24, 2001	Kitt Peak	Spacewatch	PHO	590 m	MPC · JPL
680315	2001 HB_{25}	—	April 24, 2001	Kitt Peak	Spacewatch	·	2.6 km	MPC · JPL
680316	2001 HA_{69}	—	February 27, 2006	Kitt Peak	Spacewatch	·	2.2 km	MPC · JPL
680317	2001 HN_{69}	—	October 8, 2015	Haleakala	Pan-STARRS 1	VER	2.4 km	MPC · JPL
680318	2001 HP_{69}	—	June 5, 2011	Mount Lemmon	Mount Lemmon Survey	·	620 m	MPC · JPL
680319	2001 HV_{69}	—	April 28, 2001	Kitt Peak	Spacewatch	·	1.0 km	MPC · JPL
680320	2001 HA_{70}	—	March 10, 2016	Mount Lemmon	Mount Lemmon Survey	·	850 m	MPC · JPL
680321	2001 HQ_{70}	—	October 14, 2012	Kitt Peak	Spacewatch	·	1.8 km	MPC · JPL
680322	2001 HX_{70}	—	March 16, 2010	Mount Lemmon	Mount Lemmon Survey	·	1.8 km	MPC · JPL
680323	2001 KC_{80}	—	December 3, 2005	Mauna Kea	A. Boattini	·	2.5 km	MPC · JPL
680324	2001 KB_{82}	—	September 25, 2005	Kitt Peak	Spacewatch	·	550 m	MPC · JPL
680325	2001 KH_{82}	—	March 29, 2012	Haleakala	Pan-STARRS 1	·	3.0 km	MPC · JPL
680326	2001 KR_{82}	—	April 5, 2014	Haleakala	Pan-STARRS 1	·	1.5 km	MPC · JPL
680327	2001 KU_{82}	—	September 30, 2016	Haleakala	Pan-STARRS 1	KOR	1.0 km	MPC · JPL
680328	2001 KM_{83}	—	December 2, 2010	Mount Lemmon	Mount Lemmon Survey	·	2.5 km	MPC · JPL
680329	2001 KT_{83}	—	January 30, 2011	Haleakala	Pan-STARRS 1	·	2.3 km	MPC · JPL
680330	2001 KC_{84}	—	January 26, 2011	Mount Lemmon	Mount Lemmon Survey	HYG	2.9 km	MPC · JPL
680331	2001 KH_{84}	—	January 26, 2017	Haleakala	Pan-STARRS 1	·	2.5 km	MPC · JPL
680332	2001 KQ_{84}	—	October 7, 2016	Haleakala	Pan-STARRS 1	·	1.4 km	MPC · JPL
680333	2001 KC_{86}	—	February 28, 2014	Haleakala	Pan-STARRS 1	·	550 m	MPC · JPL
680334	2001 KT_{87}	—	November 17, 2014	Haleakala	Pan-STARRS 1	·	2.6 km	MPC · JPL
680335	2001 KB_{88}	—	February 28, 2008	Mount Lemmon	Mount Lemmon Survey	·	1.1 km	MPC · JPL
680336	2001 KX_{88}	—	May 21, 2011	Mount Lemmon	Mount Lemmon Survey	·	530 m	MPC · JPL
680337	2001 LY_{19}	—	October 7, 2008	Mount Lemmon	Mount Lemmon Survey	·	2.6 km	MPC · JPL
680338	2001 LM_{20}	—	March 29, 2012	Haleakala	Pan-STARRS 1	·	2.3 km	MPC · JPL
680339	2001 LP_{20}	—	August 25, 2014	Haleakala	Pan-STARRS 1	·	2.2 km	MPC · JPL
680340	2001 MB_{32}	—	September 23, 2008	Mount Lemmon	Mount Lemmon Survey	·	2.3 km	MPC · JPL
680341	2001 NG_{16}	—	July 13, 2001	Palomar	NEAT	·	1.8 km	MPC · JPL
680342	2001 OY_{26}	—	July 18, 2001	Palomar	NEAT	·	560 m	MPC · JPL
680343	2001 OU_{36}	—	June 30, 2001	Palomar	NEAT	·	3.9 km	MPC · JPL
680344	2001 OT_{91}	—	July 31, 2001	Palomar	NEAT	·	3.0 km	MPC · JPL
680345	2001 OL_{114}	—	August 30, 2005	Kitt Peak	Spacewatch	·	920 m	MPC · JPL
680346	2001 PG_{23}	—	August 11, 2001	Palomar	NEAT	·	2.2 km	MPC · JPL
680347	2001 QY_{271}	—	August 19, 2001	Socorro	LINEAR	·	1.2 km	MPC · JPL
680348	2001 QV_{306}	—	August 19, 2001	Cerro Tololo	Deep Ecliptic Survey	·	1.4 km	MPC · JPL
680349	2001 QA_{336}	—	December 12, 2010	Kitt Peak	Spacewatch	·	920 m	MPC · JPL
680350	2001 QK_{336}	—	March 24, 2009	Mount Lemmon	Mount Lemmon Survey	·	2.1 km	MPC · JPL
680351	2001 QH_{338}	—	December 29, 2014	Haleakala	Pan-STARRS 1	·	2.5 km	MPC · JPL
680352	2001 QB_{339}	—	January 4, 2011	Mount Lemmon	Mount Lemmon Survey	(5)	1.1 km	MPC · JPL
680353	2001 RX_{156}	—	October 6, 2016	Haleakala	Pan-STARRS 1	·	1.3 km	MPC · JPL
680354	2001 SM_{95}	—	September 9, 2001	Desert Eagle	W. K. Y. Yeung	·	580 m	MPC · JPL
680355	2001 SS_{183}	—	September 19, 2001	Socorro	LINEAR	·	470 m	MPC · JPL
680356	2001 SV_{183}	—	September 19, 2001	Socorro	LINEAR	·	940 m	MPC · JPL
680357	2001 SK_{186}	—	September 19, 2001	Socorro	LINEAR	·	1.7 km	MPC · JPL
680358	2001 SB_{226}	—	September 19, 2001	Socorro	LINEAR	MAS	680 m	MPC · JPL
680359	2001 SA_{229}	—	September 19, 2001	Socorro	LINEAR	·	2.1 km	MPC · JPL
680360	2001 SM_{330}	—	September 19, 2001	Socorro	LINEAR	·	420 m	MPC · JPL
680361	2001 SD_{335}	—	September 20, 2001	Socorro	LINEAR	·	1.8 km	MPC · JPL
680362	2001 SA_{336}	—	September 20, 2001	Kitt Peak	Spacewatch	·	1.1 km	MPC · JPL
680363	2001 SH_{358}	—	September 14, 2007	Kitt Peak	Spacewatch	·	3.1 km	MPC · JPL
680364	2001 SD_{360}	—	August 27, 2011	Haleakala	Pan-STARRS 1	EOS	1.5 km	MPC · JPL
680365	2001 SY_{362}	—	January 10, 2013	Haleakala	Pan-STARRS 1	KOR	1.0 km	MPC · JPL
680366	2001 SV_{363}	—	February 11, 2016	Haleakala	Pan-STARRS 1	VER	2.6 km	MPC · JPL
680367	2001 TS_{112}	—	October 14, 2001	Socorro	LINEAR	·	1.8 km	MPC · JPL
680368	2001 TB_{129}	—	September 21, 2001	Kitt Peak	Spacewatch	·	2.5 km	MPC · JPL
680369	2001 TW_{155}	—	September 23, 2001	Kitt Peak	Spacewatch	·	2.2 km	MPC · JPL
680370	2001 TF_{202}	—	October 11, 2001	Socorro	LINEAR	·	660 m	MPC · JPL
680371	2001 TL_{205}	—	October 11, 2001	Socorro	LINEAR	·	660 m	MPC · JPL
680372	2001 TL_{222}	—	October 14, 2001	Kitt Peak	Spacewatch	·	1.8 km	MPC · JPL
680373	2001 TM_{242}	—	October 6, 2001	La Silla	Barbieri, C.	·	880 m	MPC · JPL
680374	2001 TY_{242}	—	June 13, 2004	Palomar	NEAT	·	2.9 km	MPC · JPL
680375	2001 TG_{258}	—	October 10, 2001	Palomar	NEAT	·	1.0 km	MPC · JPL
680376	2001 TL_{261}	—	October 2, 2006	Mount Lemmon	Mount Lemmon Survey	·	1.7 km	MPC · JPL
680377	2001 TG_{264}	—	September 2, 2010	Mount Lemmon	Mount Lemmon Survey	·	1.6 km	MPC · JPL
680378	2001 TR_{264}	—	October 14, 2001	Apache Point	SDSS Collaboration	·	890 m	MPC · JPL
680379	2001 TD_{266}	—	October 13, 2006	Kitt Peak	Spacewatch	WIT	880 m	MPC · JPL
680380	2001 TE_{266}	—	July 15, 2005	Kitt Peak	Spacewatch	·	1.6 km	MPC · JPL
680381	2001 TW_{267}	—	September 10, 2010	Kitt Peak	Spacewatch	·	1.7 km	MPC · JPL
680382	2001 TA_{270}	—	October 14, 2001	Kitt Peak	Spacewatch	NAE	1.9 km	MPC · JPL
680383	2001 UN_{67}	—	October 20, 2001	Socorro	LINEAR	L5	7.7 km	MPC · JPL
680384	2001 UQ_{88}	—	October 21, 2001	Kitt Peak	Spacewatch	AGN	1.1 km	MPC · JPL
680385	2001 UM_{110}	—	October 21, 2001	Socorro	LINEAR	·	580 m	MPC · JPL
680386	2001 UO_{124}	—	October 22, 2001	Palomar	NEAT	·	2.1 km	MPC · JPL
680387	2001 UC_{166}	—	October 18, 2001	Kitt Peak	Spacewatch	·	680 m	MPC · JPL
680388	2001 UN_{171}	—	October 23, 2001	Kitt Peak	Spacewatch	·	1.2 km	MPC · JPL
680389	2001 UZ_{178}	—	October 24, 2001	Palomar	NEAT	·	1.2 km	MPC · JPL
680390	2001 UG_{183}	—	October 16, 2001	Kitt Peak	Spacewatch	·	1.8 km	MPC · JPL
680391	2001 UR_{191}	—	September 28, 2001	Palomar	NEAT	·	1.0 km	MPC · JPL
680392	2001 UZ_{191}	—	October 15, 2001	Haleakala	NEAT	·	3.5 km	MPC · JPL
680393	2001 UK_{213}	—	October 23, 2001	Socorro	LINEAR	(21344)	1.6 km	MPC · JPL
680394	2001 UD_{229}	—	October 16, 2001	Palomar	NEAT	·	1.2 km	MPC · JPL
680395	2001 UA_{234}	—	November 18, 2006	Mount Lemmon	Mount Lemmon Survey	AST	1.4 km	MPC · JPL
680396	2001 UO_{234}	—	December 8, 2010	Mount Lemmon	Mount Lemmon Survey	(5)	990 m	MPC · JPL
680397	2001 UT_{234}	—	November 17, 2006	Kitt Peak	Spacewatch	HOF	2.1 km	MPC · JPL
680398	2001 UV_{234}	—	October 7, 2008	Mount Lemmon	Mount Lemmon Survey	·	510 m	MPC · JPL
680399	2001 UG_{238}	—	January 11, 2015	Haleakala	Pan-STARRS 1	EUN	930 m	MPC · JPL
680400	2001 UJ_{238}	—	January 13, 2015	Haleakala	Pan-STARRS 1	·	1.1 km	MPC · JPL

== 680401–680500 ==
back to top

Designation			Discovery			Properties		Ref
Permanent	Provisional	Named after	Date	Site	Discoverer(s)	Category	Diam.	Ref
680401	2001 UH_{239}	—	October 21, 2006	Mount Lemmon	Mount Lemmon Survey	·	1.7 km	MPC · JPL
680402	2001 UK_{239}	—	April 10, 2013	Haleakala	Pan-STARRS 1	·	1.5 km	MPC · JPL
680403	2001 UL_{239}	—	June 22, 2014	Haleakala	Pan-STARRS 1	·	1.4 km	MPC · JPL
680404	2001 VV_{74}	—	November 14, 2001	Kitt Peak	Spacewatch	·	850 m	MPC · JPL
680405	2001 VK_{134}	—	April 21, 2004	Kitt Peak	Spacewatch	·	2.2 km	MPC · JPL
680406	2001 VY_{134}	—	February 2, 2012	Bergisch Gladbach	W. Bickel	·	2.2 km	MPC · JPL
680407	2001 VJ_{135}	—	October 1, 2008	Kitt Peak	Spacewatch	·	520 m	MPC · JPL
680408	2001 VH_{136}	—	October 10, 2015	Haleakala	Pan-STARRS 1	·	1.7 km	MPC · JPL
680409	2001 VP_{136}	—	March 10, 2018	Haleakala	Pan-STARRS 1	PHO	720 m	MPC · JPL
680410	2001 WY_{22}	—	October 14, 2001	Socorro	LINEAR	·	570 m	MPC · JPL
680411	2001 WM_{79}	—	November 20, 2001	Socorro	LINEAR	JUN	870 m	MPC · JPL
680412	2001 WX_{88}	—	November 19, 2001	Socorro	LINEAR	·	760 m	MPC · JPL
680413	2001 WN_{104}	—	November 20, 2001	Socorro	LINEAR	NYS	1.2 km	MPC · JPL
680414	2001 WL_{106}	—	September 18, 2010	Mount Lemmon	Mount Lemmon Survey	KOR	1.0 km	MPC · JPL
680415	2001 WP_{106}	—	August 14, 2017	Haleakala	Pan-STARRS 1	BRG	1.1 km	MPC · JPL
680416	2001 WW_{106}	—	February 10, 2008	Kitt Peak	Spacewatch	·	1.7 km	MPC · JPL
680417	2001 XW_{77}	—	December 11, 2001	Socorro	LINEAR	·	1.1 km	MPC · JPL
680418	2001 XH_{263}	—	December 14, 2001	Socorro	LINEAR	·	1.3 km	MPC · JPL
680419	2001 YT_{162}	—	November 17, 2006	Kitt Peak	Spacewatch	EOS	1.8 km	MPC · JPL
680420	2001 YA_{164}	—	December 20, 2001	Kitt Peak	Spacewatch	EOS	1.4 km	MPC · JPL
680421	2001 YT_{164}	—	November 27, 2014	Haleakala	Pan-STARRS 1	·	1.2 km	MPC · JPL
680422	2001 YW_{164}	—	December 23, 2001	Kitt Peak	Spacewatch	MAR	830 m	MPC · JPL
680423	2002 AJ_{127}	—	January 13, 2002	Socorro	LINEAR	·	1.6 km	MPC · JPL
680424	2002 AZ_{133}	—	January 9, 2002	Socorro	LINEAR	GEF	1.5 km	MPC · JPL
680425	2002 AY_{135}	—	December 11, 2001	Socorro	LINEAR	·	2.2 km	MPC · JPL
680426	2002 AP_{145}	—	January 13, 2002	Socorro	LINEAR	EOS	1.6 km	MPC · JPL
680427	2002 AG_{211}	—	March 31, 2008	Mount Lemmon	Mount Lemmon Survey	·	1.7 km	MPC · JPL
680428	2002 AJ_{211}	—	December 10, 2005	Kitt Peak	Spacewatch	·	1.2 km	MPC · JPL
680429	2002 AD_{214}	—	December 22, 2008	Kitt Peak	Spacewatch	·	710 m	MPC · JPL
680430	2002 AB_{215}	—	October 26, 2011	Haleakala	Pan-STARRS 1	·	2.0 km	MPC · JPL
680431	2002 AW_{215}	—	October 12, 2005	Kitt Peak	Spacewatch	KOR	1.1 km	MPC · JPL
680432	2002 AM_{216}	—	November 24, 2006	Mount Lemmon	Mount Lemmon Survey	·	2.6 km	MPC · JPL
680433	2002 AN_{216}	—	December 13, 2017	Haleakala	Pan-STARRS 1	EOS	1.3 km	MPC · JPL
680434	2002 AU_{216}	—	November 20, 2006	Kitt Peak	Spacewatch	·	1.8 km	MPC · JPL
680435	2002 BG_{2}	—	January 21, 2002	Kitt Peak	Spacewatch	H	400 m	MPC · JPL
680436	2002 BV_{32}	—	January 18, 2013	Mount Lemmon	Mount Lemmon Survey	·	1.6 km	MPC · JPL
680437	2002 BF_{33}	—	February 15, 2012	Haleakala	Pan-STARRS 1	BRA	1.5 km	MPC · JPL
680438	2002 BZ_{33}	—	January 17, 2015	Haleakala	Pan-STARRS 1	HNS	840 m	MPC · JPL
680439	2002 BE_{34}	—	November 8, 2016	Mount Lemmon	Mount Lemmon Survey	·	2.0 km	MPC · JPL
680440	2002 CO_{92}	—	January 13, 2002	Socorro	LINEAR	·	1.9 km	MPC · JPL
680441	2002 CA_{186}	—	February 10, 2002	Socorro	LINEAR	·	790 m	MPC · JPL
680442	2002 CF_{193}	—	February 7, 2002	Socorro	LINEAR	AGN	1.6 km	MPC · JPL
680443	2002 CO_{193}	—	February 10, 2002	Socorro	LINEAR	·	1.5 km	MPC · JPL
680444	2002 CB_{210}	—	February 7, 2002	Socorro	LINEAR	·	2.7 km	MPC · JPL
680445	2002 CR_{250}	—	February 6, 2002	Kitt Peak	Deep Ecliptic Survey	EOS	1.6 km	MPC · JPL
680446	2002 CK_{257}	—	January 22, 2002	Kitt Peak	Spacewatch	·	1.8 km	MPC · JPL
680447	2002 CN_{267}	—	February 7, 2002	Kitt Peak	Spacewatch	·	1.6 km	MPC · JPL
680448	2002 CR_{276}	—	February 7, 2002	Kitt Peak	Spacewatch	MAS	540 m	MPC · JPL
680449	2002 CW_{286}	—	February 8, 2002	Kitt Peak	Spacewatch	·	780 m	MPC · JPL
680450	2002 CZ_{315}	—	February 13, 2002	Kitt Peak	Spacewatch	·	1.3 km	MPC · JPL
680451	2002 CR_{316}	—	February 14, 2012	Haleakala	Pan-STARRS 1	·	1.6 km	MPC · JPL
680452	2002 CY_{318}	—	July 11, 2009	Kitt Peak	Spacewatch	·	930 m	MPC · JPL
680453	2002 CX_{319}	—	January 25, 2015	Haleakala	Pan-STARRS 1	·	1.3 km	MPC · JPL
680454	2002 CO_{320}	—	September 4, 2011	Haleakala	Pan-STARRS 1	V	610 m	MPC · JPL
680455	2002 CU_{321}	—	October 25, 2011	Haleakala	Pan-STARRS 1	·	1.7 km	MPC · JPL
680456	2002 CJ_{322}	—	October 1, 2016	Mount Lemmon	Mount Lemmon Survey	·	2.0 km	MPC · JPL
680457	2002 CM_{322}	—	February 17, 2013	Mount Lemmon	Mount Lemmon Survey	·	1.8 km	MPC · JPL
680458	2002 CE_{323}	—	August 22, 2004	Kitt Peak	Spacewatch	·	2.8 km	MPC · JPL
680459	2002 CS_{323}	—	February 13, 2002	Kitt Peak	Spacewatch	·	1.3 km	MPC · JPL
680460	2002 CU_{325}	—	August 27, 2009	Kitt Peak	Spacewatch	·	1.3 km	MPC · JPL
680461	2002 CW_{325}	—	July 25, 2014	Haleakala	Pan-STARRS 1	KOR	1.1 km	MPC · JPL
680462	2002 CY_{325}	—	July 30, 2014	Kitt Peak	Spacewatch	·	1.4 km	MPC · JPL
680463	2002 CU_{326}	—	October 1, 2005	Mount Lemmon	Mount Lemmon Survey	·	1.7 km	MPC · JPL
680464	2002 CX_{328}	—	February 8, 2002	Kitt Peak	Deep Ecliptic Survey	·	770 m	MPC · JPL
680465	2002 CB_{329}	—	February 13, 2002	Apache Point	SDSS	·	1.3 km	MPC · JPL
680466	2002 DA_{5}	—	February 18, 2002	Cerro Tololo	Deep Lens Survey	·	1.9 km	MPC · JPL
680467	2002 DR_{21}	—	March 13, 2013	Haleakala	Pan-STARRS 1	·	1.9 km	MPC · JPL
680468	2002 EW_{17}	—	March 5, 2002	Kitt Peak	Spacewatch	MAR	780 m	MPC · JPL
680469	2002 EH_{18}	—	March 9, 2002	Kitt Peak	Spacewatch	·	1.7 km	MPC · JPL
680470	2002 EO_{78}	—	February 8, 2002	Kitt Peak	Spacewatch	·	810 m	MPC · JPL
680471	2002 EG_{108}	—	March 9, 2002	Palomar	NEAT	·	2.2 km	MPC · JPL
680472	2002 EO_{109}	—	March 9, 2002	Kitt Peak	Spacewatch	·	2.0 km	MPC · JPL
680473	2002 EQ_{166}	—	September 20, 2008	Mount Lemmon	Mount Lemmon Survey	·	1.2 km	MPC · JPL
680474	2002 EK_{167}	—	October 2, 2010	Kitt Peak	Spacewatch	·	2.3 km	MPC · JPL
680475	2002 EB_{168}	—	August 28, 2014	Haleakala	Pan-STARRS 1	EOS	1.8 km	MPC · JPL
680476	2002 EB_{170}	—	January 17, 2007	Kitt Peak	Spacewatch	·	1.8 km	MPC · JPL
680477	2002 EG_{170}	—	January 16, 2018	Haleakala	Pan-STARRS 1	EOS	1.4 km	MPC · JPL
680478	2002 EG_{171}	—	March 2, 2013	Mount Lemmon	Mount Lemmon Survey	·	2.0 km	MPC · JPL
680479	2002 EH_{171}	—	March 12, 2013	Mount Lemmon	Mount Lemmon Survey	·	1.6 km	MPC · JPL
680480	2002 FD_{42}	—	November 27, 2009	Mount Lemmon	Mount Lemmon Survey	·	1.3 km	MPC · JPL
680481	2002 FG_{43}	—	February 16, 2015	Haleakala	Pan-STARRS 1	·	1.3 km	MPC · JPL
680482	2002 GS_{6}	—	April 10, 2002	Socorro	LINEAR	H	570 m	MPC · JPL
680483	2002 GT_{30}	—	April 7, 2002	Cerro Tololo	Deep Ecliptic Survey	·	1.1 km	MPC · JPL
680484	2002 GE_{31}	—	April 7, 2002	Cerro Tololo	Deep Ecliptic Survey	L4	6.4 km	MPC · JPL
680485	2002 GK_{36}	—	April 2, 2002	Kitt Peak	Spacewatch	·	940 m	MPC · JPL
680486	2002 GS_{54}	—	April 5, 2002	Palomar	NEAT	·	1.8 km	MPC · JPL
680487	2002 GB_{177}	—	April 7, 2002	Cerro Tololo	Deep Ecliptic Survey	·	1.9 km	MPC · JPL
680488	2002 GL_{178}	—	April 8, 2002	La Silla	Barbieri, C.	·	1.9 km	MPC · JPL
680489	2002 GF_{183}	—	April 4, 2002	Palomar	NEAT	·	3.2 km	MPC · JPL
680490	2002 GZ_{187}	—	April 2, 2002	Palomar	NEAT	·	980 m	MPC · JPL
680491	2002 GO_{194}	—	March 13, 2013	Kitt Peak	Spacewatch	V	470 m	MPC · JPL
680492	2002 GQ_{194}	—	April 12, 2013	Mount Lemmon	Mount Lemmon Survey	MAS	590 m	MPC · JPL
680493	2002 GV_{194}	—	September 10, 2007	Mount Lemmon	Mount Lemmon Survey	V	500 m	MPC · JPL
680494	2002 GL_{196}	—	September 15, 2009	Kitt Peak	Spacewatch	EOS	1.3 km	MPC · JPL
680495	2002 GR_{196}	—	October 25, 2016	Haleakala	Pan-STARRS 1	·	2.7 km	MPC · JPL
680496	2002 HY_{18}	—	April 14, 2008	Kitt Peak	Spacewatch	·	2.1 km	MPC · JPL
680497	2002 HB_{19}	—	January 20, 2009	Mount Lemmon	Mount Lemmon Survey	·	710 m	MPC · JPL
680498	2002 JB_{143}	—	May 11, 2002	Palomar	NEAT	·	2.0 km	MPC · JPL
680499	2002 JE_{152}	—	September 20, 2006	Palomar	NEAT	·	670 m	MPC · JPL
680500	2002 JO_{153}	—	December 20, 2017	Mount Lemmon	Mount Lemmon Survey	H	440 m	MPC · JPL

== 680501–680600 ==
back to top

Designation			Discovery			Properties		Ref
Permanent	Provisional	Named after	Date	Site	Discoverer(s)	Category	Diam.	Ref
680501	2002 JD_{154}	—	May 5, 2002	Palomar	NEAT	·	1.3 km	MPC · JPL
680502	2002 KK_{17}	—	January 11, 2011	Kitt Peak	Spacewatch	EUP	3.3 km	MPC · JPL
680503	2002 LV_{63}	—	June 2, 2002	Palomar	NEAT	·	2.1 km	MPC · JPL
680504	2002 LE_{65}	—	June 13, 2002	Palomar	NEAT	·	1.8 km	MPC · JPL
680505	2002 LL_{65}	—	July 1, 2002	Palomar	NEAT	·	2.7 km	MPC · JPL
680506	2002 LA_{66}	—	October 1, 2014	Haleakala	Pan-STARRS 1	·	2.3 km	MPC · JPL
680507	2002 NJ_{66}	—	July 9, 2002	Palomar	NEAT	MAR	1.1 km	MPC · JPL
680508	2002 NF_{69}	—	August 3, 2002	Palomar	NEAT	·	1.2 km	MPC · JPL
680509	2002 NF_{70}	—	August 5, 2002	Campo Imperatore	CINEOS	·	2.6 km	MPC · JPL
680510	2002 NF_{73}	—	July 10, 2002	Campo Imperatore	CINEOS	·	2.6 km	MPC · JPL
680511	2002 NN_{76}	—	November 19, 2003	Socorro	LINEAR	·	2.6 km	MPC · JPL
680512	2002 NX_{77}	—	October 19, 2003	Kitt Peak	Spacewatch	T_{j} (2.99) · 3:2	3.9 km	MPC · JPL
680513	2002 OO_{23}	—	July 22, 2002	Palomar	NEAT	·	2.9 km	MPC · JPL
680514	2002 OG_{24}	—	July 29, 2002	Palomar	NEAT	·	1.7 km	MPC · JPL
680515	2002 OB_{32}	—	July 18, 2002	Palomar	NEAT	EOS	1.9 km	MPC · JPL
680516	2002 OS_{34}	—	July 7, 2002	Kitt Peak	Spacewatch	·	1.0 km	MPC · JPL
680517	2002 OJ_{35}	—	June 21, 2007	Mount Lemmon	Mount Lemmon Survey	·	2.6 km	MPC · JPL
680518	2002 ON_{36}	—	February 12, 2009	Calar Alto	F. Hormuth, Datson, J. C.	EUN	1.1 km	MPC · JPL
680519	2002 OP_{38}	—	July 20, 2002	Palomar	NEAT	·	2.6 km	MPC · JPL
680520	2002 PN_{1}	—	July 18, 2002	Socorro	LINEAR	·	2.3 km	MPC · JPL
680521	2002 PS_{107}	—	August 13, 2002	Palomar	NEAT	EOS	1.7 km	MPC · JPL
680522	2002 PX_{150}	—	July 29, 2002	Palomar	NEAT	·	2.7 km	MPC · JPL
680523	2002 PX_{164}	—	August 12, 2002	Socorro	LINEAR	·	640 m	MPC · JPL
680524	2002 PN_{170}	—	August 15, 2002	Palomar	NEAT	·	970 m	MPC · JPL
680525	2002 PQ_{182}	—	August 13, 2002	Palomar	NEAT	·	500 m	MPC · JPL
680526	2002 PF_{183}	—	August 11, 2002	Palomar	NEAT	·	1.9 km	MPC · JPL
680527	2002 PN_{191}	—	August 7, 2002	Palomar	NEAT	·	2.6 km	MPC · JPL
680528	2002 PS_{191}	—	January 20, 2009	Mount Lemmon	Mount Lemmon Survey	·	1.6 km	MPC · JPL
680529	2002 PX_{195}	—	September 5, 2008	Kitt Peak	Spacewatch	VER	2.4 km	MPC · JPL
680530	2002 PH_{196}	—	September 19, 2007	Kitt Peak	Spacewatch	·	1.4 km	MPC · JPL
680531	2002 PP_{199}	—	January 29, 2011	Kitt Peak	Spacewatch	·	2.5 km	MPC · JPL
680532	2002 PS_{203}	—	April 30, 2005	Kitt Peak	Spacewatch	·	740 m	MPC · JPL
680533	2002 PH_{204}	—	February 8, 2011	Mount Lemmon	Mount Lemmon Survey	·	2.7 km	MPC · JPL
680534	2002 QA_{20}	—	August 28, 2002	Palomar	NEAT	·	520 m	MPC · JPL
680535	2002 QC_{26}	—	August 29, 2002	Kitt Peak	Spacewatch	·	3.2 km	MPC · JPL
680536	2002 QU_{52}	—	August 29, 2002	Palomar	NEAT	·	1.4 km	MPC · JPL
680537	2002 QP_{59}	—	August 28, 2002	Palomar	NEAT	·	2.0 km	MPC · JPL
680538	2002 QO_{63}	—	August 30, 2002	Palomar	NEAT	EUN	1.1 km	MPC · JPL
680539	2002 QD_{76}	—	August 17, 2002	Palomar	NEAT	·	960 m	MPC · JPL
680540	2002 QP_{84}	—	August 19, 2002	Palomar	NEAT	·	810 m	MPC · JPL
680541	2002 QA_{90}	—	August 19, 2002	Palomar	NEAT	·	3.0 km	MPC · JPL
680542	2002 QR_{95}	—	August 18, 2002	Palomar	NEAT	·	2.7 km	MPC · JPL
680543	2002 QX_{105}	—	August 15, 2002	Anderson Mesa	LONEOS	·	2.8 km	MPC · JPL
680544	2002 QM_{111}	—	August 19, 2002	Palomar	NEAT	·	510 m	MPC · JPL
680545	2002 QW_{116}	—	August 29, 2002	Palomar	NEAT	·	1.3 km	MPC · JPL
680546	2002 QU_{117}	—	August 16, 2002	Palomar	NEAT	·	1.6 km	MPC · JPL
680547	2002 QC_{121}	—	September 19, 1998	Apache Point	SDSS Collaboration	·	1.4 km	MPC · JPL
680548	2002 QP_{122}	—	August 26, 2002	Palomar	NEAT	LIX	2.8 km	MPC · JPL
680549	2002 QD_{125}	—	August 30, 2002	Palomar	NEAT	·	870 m	MPC · JPL
680550	2002 QZ_{125}	—	August 12, 2002	Cerro Tololo	Deep Ecliptic Survey	·	1.3 km	MPC · JPL
680551	2002 QF_{126}	—	August 27, 2002	Palomar	NEAT	·	2.5 km	MPC · JPL
680552	2002 QH_{126}	—	September 14, 2002	Kitt Peak	Spacewatch	·	1.3 km	MPC · JPL
680553	2002 QJ_{140}	—	August 30, 2002	Kitt Peak	Spacewatch	THM	2.0 km	MPC · JPL
680554	2002 QU_{143}	—	August 27, 2002	Palomar	NEAT	·	2.1 km	MPC · JPL
680555	2002 QJ_{147}	—	September 23, 2008	Mount Lemmon	Mount Lemmon Survey	HYG	2.8 km	MPC · JPL
680556	2002 QJ_{148}	—	August 19, 2002	Palomar	NEAT	·	2.7 km	MPC · JPL
680557	2002 QN_{149}	—	November 18, 2003	Kitt Peak	Spacewatch	·	2.1 km	MPC · JPL
680558	2002 QT_{149}	—	September 7, 2008	Mount Lemmon	Mount Lemmon Survey	·	2.6 km	MPC · JPL
680559	2002 QK_{153}	—	June 23, 2009	Mount Lemmon	Mount Lemmon Survey	(2076)	720 m	MPC · JPL
680560	2002 QS_{154}	—	November 6, 2008	Mount Lemmon	Mount Lemmon Survey	·	2.5 km	MPC · JPL
680561	2002 QJ_{155}	—	April 29, 2008	Kitt Peak	Spacewatch	·	680 m	MPC · JPL
680562	2002 QS_{156}	—	August 3, 2002	Palomar	NEAT	·	970 m	MPC · JPL
680563	2002 QY_{157}	—	April 6, 2013	Mount Lemmon	Mount Lemmon Survey	·	1.5 km	MPC · JPL
680564	2002 QH_{158}	—	April 25, 2007	Mount Lemmon	Mount Lemmon Survey	·	2.2 km	MPC · JPL
680565	2002 QS_{158}	—	July 5, 2016	Haleakala	Pan-STARRS 1	·	850 m	MPC · JPL
680566	2002 RM_{1}	—	July 20, 2002	Palomar	NEAT	·	1.9 km	MPC · JPL
680567	2002 RN_{125}	—	September 3, 2002	Palomar	NEAT	PHO	930 m	MPC · JPL
680568	2002 RC_{142}	—	September 11, 2002	Palomar	NEAT	·	470 m	MPC · JPL
680569	2002 RJ_{145}	—	September 11, 2002	Palomar	NEAT	·	1.3 km	MPC · JPL
680570	2002 RE_{191}	—	September 15, 2002	Haleakala	NEAT	(18466)	2.1 km	MPC · JPL
680571	2002 RK_{219}	—	August 19, 2002	Palomar	NEAT	EOS	2.4 km	MPC · JPL
680572	2002 RL_{222}	—	September 15, 2002	Haleakala	NEAT	·	680 m	MPC · JPL
680573	2002 RO_{227}	—	September 14, 2002	Palomar	NEAT	EUN	1.0 km	MPC · JPL
680574	2002 RT_{247}	—	September 4, 2002	Palomar	NEAT	·	1.3 km	MPC · JPL
680575	2002 RO_{252}	—	September 12, 2002	Palomar	NEAT	·	3.2 km	MPC · JPL
680576	2002 RO_{254}	—	September 14, 2002	Palomar	NEAT	(1298)	2.8 km	MPC · JPL
680577	2002 RQ_{254}	—	September 14, 2002	Palomar	NEAT	·	1.4 km	MPC · JPL
680578	2002 RK_{257}	—	September 10, 2002	Palomar	NEAT	·	2.8 km	MPC · JPL
680579	2002 RV_{260}	—	October 9, 2002	Kitt Peak	Spacewatch	·	1.4 km	MPC · JPL
680580	2002 RE_{261}	—	September 11, 2002	Palomar	NEAT	·	1.7 km	MPC · JPL
680581	2002 RK_{273}	—	September 4, 2002	Palomar	NEAT	·	2.4 km	MPC · JPL
680582	2002 RC_{274}	—	September 4, 2002	Palomar	NEAT	·	2.3 km	MPC · JPL
680583	2002 RA_{275}	—	September 4, 2002	Palomar	NEAT	WIT	910 m	MPC · JPL
680584	2002 RF_{279}	—	September 3, 2002	Palomar	NEAT	EOS	2.0 km	MPC · JPL
680585	2002 RA_{280}	—	September 5, 2002	Apache Point	SDSS	·	1.2 km	MPC · JPL
680586	2002 RJ_{280}	—	September 5, 2002	Apache Point	SDSS	·	1.4 km	MPC · JPL
680587	2002 RE_{286}	—	September 4, 2002	Palomar	NEAT	EUN	1.1 km	MPC · JPL
680588	2002 RJ_{286}	—	September 23, 2008	Mount Lemmon	Mount Lemmon Survey	·	2.8 km	MPC · JPL
680589	2002 RK_{286}	—	August 27, 2009	Sierra Stars	R. Matson	·	860 m	MPC · JPL
680590	2002 RP_{287}	—	September 12, 2002	Palomar	NEAT	·	2.0 km	MPC · JPL
680591	2002 RD_{290}	—	September 4, 2002	Palomar	NEAT	GEF	1.2 km	MPC · JPL
680592	2002 RE_{293}	—	May 25, 2007	Mount Lemmon	Mount Lemmon Survey	EOS	1.8 km	MPC · JPL
680593	2002 RL_{293}	—	September 4, 2002	Palomar	NEAT	·	2.8 km	MPC · JPL
680594	2002 RE_{294}	—	September 3, 2002	Palomar	NEAT	·	510 m	MPC · JPL
680595	2002 RJ_{294}	—	October 28, 2013	Catalina	CSS	·	2.1 km	MPC · JPL
680596	2002 RW_{296}	—	October 8, 2013	Kitt Peak	Spacewatch	EOS	1.7 km	MPC · JPL
680597	2002 RE_{297}	—	October 12, 2009	Mount Lemmon	Mount Lemmon Survey	·	830 m	MPC · JPL
680598	2002 RU_{297}	—	February 28, 2009	Kitt Peak	Spacewatch	·	1.5 km	MPC · JPL
680599	2002 RZ_{297}	—	March 4, 2011	Mount Lemmon	Mount Lemmon Survey	·	2.4 km	MPC · JPL
680600	2002 RL_{298}	—	September 22, 2014	Haleakala	Pan-STARRS 1	·	1 km	MPC · JPL

== 680601–680700 ==
back to top

Designation			Discovery			Properties		Ref
Permanent	Provisional	Named after	Date	Site	Discoverer(s)	Category	Diam.	Ref
680601	2002 RG_{299}	—	April 8, 2010	Mount Lemmon	Mount Lemmon Survey	·	1.5 km	MPC · JPL
680602	2002 RP_{300}	—	July 4, 2016	Haleakala	Pan-STARRS 1	·	660 m	MPC · JPL
680603	2002 SP_{39}	—	September 26, 2002	Palomar	NEAT	·	550 m	MPC · JPL
680604	2002 SK_{67}	—	September 16, 2002	Palomar	NEAT	MRX	830 m	MPC · JPL
680605	2002 SH_{73}	—	September 16, 2002	Palomar	NEAT	EOS	1.7 km	MPC · JPL
680606	2002 TB_{99}	—	October 3, 2002	Socorro	LINEAR	·	820 m	MPC · JPL
680607	2002 TC_{140}	—	October 3, 2002	Socorro	LINEAR	EOS	2.2 km	MPC · JPL
680608	2002 TT_{145}	—	October 3, 2002	Campo Imperatore	CINEOS	·	3.0 km	MPC · JPL
680609	2002 TM_{154}	—	September 3, 2002	Palomar	NEAT	·	1.4 km	MPC · JPL
680610	2002 TL_{161}	—	October 5, 2002	Palomar	NEAT	·	2.6 km	MPC · JPL
680611	2002 TQ_{163}	—	October 5, 2002	Palomar	NEAT	·	3.4 km	MPC · JPL
680612	2002 TF_{256}	—	October 3, 2002	Socorro	LINEAR	·	2.8 km	MPC · JPL
680613	2002 TG_{273}	—	October 4, 2002	Socorro	LINEAR	·	560 m	MPC · JPL
680614	2002 TO_{379}	—	December 13, 2006	Kitt Peak	Spacewatch	NYS	640 m	MPC · JPL
680615	2002 TT_{381}	—	October 11, 2002	Apache Point	SDSS	AGN	1.1 km	MPC · JPL
680616	2002 TH_{383}	—	October 5, 2002	Anderson Mesa	LONEOS	·	1.2 km	MPC · JPL
680617	2002 TM_{386}	—	October 4, 2002	Palomar	NEAT	·	1.5 km	MPC · JPL
680618	2002 TG_{389}	—	November 22, 2006	Kitt Peak	Spacewatch	MAS	730 m	MPC · JPL
680619	2002 TM_{389}	—	September 30, 2006	Mount Lemmon	Mount Lemmon Survey	·	1.3 km	MPC · JPL
680620	2002 TG_{390}	—	September 1, 2013	Mount Lemmon	Mount Lemmon Survey	·	2.6 km	MPC · JPL
680621	2002 TE_{391}	—	May 3, 2008	Mount Lemmon	Mount Lemmon Survey	·	570 m	MPC · JPL
680622	2002 TX_{392}	—	October 11, 2015	Bergisch Gladbach	W. Bickel	·	550 m	MPC · JPL
680623	2002 TE_{393}	—	November 6, 2010	Mount Lemmon	Mount Lemmon Survey	·	1.2 km	MPC · JPL
680624	2002 TJ_{393}	—	September 22, 2014	Haleakala	Pan-STARRS 1	·	2.2 km	MPC · JPL
680625	2002 TN_{393}	—	December 17, 2009	Kitt Peak	Spacewatch	·	580 m	MPC · JPL
680626	2002 TY_{393}	—	June 11, 2015	Haleakala	Pan-STARRS 1	AST	1.3 km	MPC · JPL
680627	2002 UH_{1}	—	October 15, 2002	Palomar	NEAT	·	3.5 km	MPC · JPL
680628	2002 UK_{1}	—	October 28, 2002	Kitt Peak	Spacewatch	·	2.6 km	MPC · JPL
680629	2002 UD_{75}	—	September 1, 2005	Palomar	NEAT	·	630 m	MPC · JPL
680630	2002 UU_{77}	—	May 10, 2005	Cerro Tololo	Deep Ecliptic Survey	·	1.4 km	MPC · JPL
680631	2002 UJ_{79}	—	January 11, 2018	Haleakala	Pan-STARRS 1	·	1.4 km	MPC · JPL
680632	2002 UR_{80}	—	April 15, 2012	Haleakala	Pan-STARRS 1	·	1.2 km	MPC · JPL
680633	2002 VD_{1}	—	November 1, 2002	La Palma	A. Fitzsimmons	·	1.6 km	MPC · JPL
680634	2002 VX_{2}	—	November 4, 2002	Wrightwood	J. W. Young	VER	2.5 km	MPC · JPL
680635	2002 VK_{57}	—	November 6, 2002	Haleakala	NEAT	T_{j} (2.83)	4.8 km	MPC · JPL
680636	2002 VZ_{111}	—	November 13, 2002	Kitt Peak	Spacewatch	·	1.5 km	MPC · JPL
680637	2002 VF_{117}	—	November 13, 2002	Palomar	NEAT	·	1.9 km	MPC · JPL
680638	2002 VV_{137}	—	November 13, 2002	Palomar	NEAT	MAS	530 m	MPC · JPL
680639	2002 VN_{149}	—	September 22, 2009	Mount Lemmon	Mount Lemmon Survey	3:2	5.2 km	MPC · JPL
680640	2002 VY_{151}	—	November 1, 2002	La Palma	A. Fitzsimmons	·	2.6 km	MPC · JPL
680641	2002 VC_{154}	—	July 20, 2013	Haleakala	Pan-STARRS 1	·	3.1 km	MPC · JPL
680642	2002 VE_{154}	—	January 24, 2014	Haleakala	Pan-STARRS 1	·	510 m	MPC · JPL
680643	2002 WO_{22}	—	November 25, 2002	Palomar	NEAT	·	1.4 km	MPC · JPL
680644	2002 WN_{23}	—	September 19, 2006	Kitt Peak	Spacewatch	·	1.7 km	MPC · JPL
680645	2002 WC_{33}	—	November 8, 2007	Kitt Peak	Spacewatch	·	2.0 km	MPC · JPL
680646	2002 XN_{15}	—	November 12, 2002	Socorro	LINEAR	·	3.9 km	MPC · JPL
680647	2002 XY_{121}	—	December 23, 2006	Mount Lemmon	Mount Lemmon Survey	·	1.0 km	MPC · JPL
680648	2002 XH_{122}	—	April 13, 2011	Mount Lemmon	Mount Lemmon Survey	V	590 m	MPC · JPL
680649	2002 XC_{123}	—	October 13, 2013	Mount Lemmon	Mount Lemmon Survey	·	2.4 km	MPC · JPL
680650	2002 XE_{123}	—	November 12, 2006	Mount Lemmon	Mount Lemmon Survey	AEO	1.1 km	MPC · JPL
680651	2002 XL_{123}	—	July 19, 2001	Anderson Mesa	LONEOS	·	3.2 km	MPC · JPL
680652	2002 XX_{123}	—	August 4, 2013	Haleakala	Pan-STARRS 1	·	800 m	MPC · JPL
680653	2002 XM_{124}	—	October 3, 2013	Kitt Peak	Spacewatch	·	3.0 km	MPC · JPL
680654	2002 XU_{124}	—	July 27, 2017	Haleakala	Pan-STARRS 1	·	1.1 km	MPC · JPL
680655	2002 YD_{25}	—	December 31, 2002	Socorro	LINEAR	TIR	3.0 km	MPC · JPL
680656	2002 YW_{33}	—	December 31, 2002	Socorro	LINEAR	·	910 m	MPC · JPL
680657	2003 AG_{95}	—	January 11, 2003	Kitt Peak	Spacewatch	EOS	1.3 km	MPC · JPL
680658	2003 BP_{23}	—	January 25, 2003	Palomar	NEAT	·	2.5 km	MPC · JPL
680659	2003 BU_{84}	—	January 31, 2003	Palomar	NEAT	NYS	1 km	MPC · JPL
680660	2003 BN_{95}	—	February 26, 2014	Oukaïmeden	M. Ory	EOS	1.5 km	MPC · JPL
680661	2003 BA_{96}	—	January 28, 2011	Mount Lemmon	Mount Lemmon Survey	·	890 m	MPC · JPL
680662	2003 BE_{96}	—	October 2, 2006	Mount Lemmon	Mount Lemmon Survey	·	2.5 km	MPC · JPL
680663	2003 BH_{98}	—	November 13, 2012	Kitt Peak	Spacewatch	·	500 m	MPC · JPL
680664	2003 BK_{100}	—	December 8, 2017	Haleakala	Pan-STARRS 1	·	1.6 km	MPC · JPL
680665	2003 BL_{100}	—	January 9, 2014	Mount Lemmon	Mount Lemmon Survey	THM	1.4 km	MPC · JPL
680666	2003 BE_{101}	—	October 2, 2016	Mount Lemmon	Mount Lemmon Survey	EOS	1.3 km	MPC · JPL
680667	2003 BG_{101}	—	November 26, 2014	Haleakala	Pan-STARRS 1	EUN	1.1 km	MPC · JPL
680668	2003 BQ_{101}	—	September 25, 2005	Kitt Peak	Spacewatch	·	1.0 km	MPC · JPL
680669	2003 BB_{102}	—	March 21, 2017	Mount Lemmon	Mount Lemmon Survey	·	650 m	MPC · JPL
680670	2003 CQ_{26}	—	September 12, 2005	Kitt Peak	Spacewatch	·	1.0 km	MPC · JPL
680671	2003 CR_{26}	—	December 19, 2007	Kitt Peak	Spacewatch	·	2.9 km	MPC · JPL
680672	2003 CC_{27}	—	January 3, 2016	Haleakala	Pan-STARRS 1	·	3.7 km	MPC · JPL
680673	2003 CU_{27}	—	October 22, 2009	Mount Lemmon	Mount Lemmon Survey	·	1.1 km	MPC · JPL
680674	2003 DP_{6}	—	February 23, 2003	Campo Imperatore	CINEOS	·	2.1 km	MPC · JPL
680675	2003 DR_{25}	—	September 9, 2015	Haleakala	Pan-STARRS 1	·	660 m	MPC · JPL
680676	2003 EZ_{54}	—	March 8, 2003	Kitt Peak	Deep Lens Survey	EOS	1.2 km	MPC · JPL
680677	2003 EA_{64}	—	March 13, 2003	Kitt Peak	Spacewatch	·	1.3 km	MPC · JPL
680678	2003 EY_{64}	—	February 6, 2007	Kitt Peak	Spacewatch	·	1.1 km	MPC · JPL
680679	2003 FJ	—	March 23, 2003	Palomar	NEAT	H	380 m	MPC · JPL
680680	2003 FR_{35}	—	March 23, 2003	Kitt Peak	Spacewatch	·	1.0 km	MPC · JPL
680681	2003 FK_{55}	—	March 26, 2003	Palomar	NEAT	·	1.1 km	MPC · JPL
680682	2003 FN_{124}	—	March 31, 2003	Kitt Peak	Spacewatch	·	2.1 km	MPC · JPL
680683	2003 FO_{125}	—	March 30, 2003	Kitt Peak	Deep Ecliptic Survey	·	870 m	MPC · JPL
680684	2003 FR_{132}	—	March 29, 2003	Anderson Mesa	LONEOS	EUN	1.1 km	MPC · JPL
680685	2003 FR_{134}	—	March 27, 2003	Palomar	NEAT	·	2.4 km	MPC · JPL
680686	2003 FW_{134}	—	November 11, 2006	Kitt Peak	Spacewatch	EOS	1.6 km	MPC · JPL
680687	2003 FE_{135}	—	March 23, 2003	Apache Point	SDSS Collaboration	·	1.3 km	MPC · JPL
680688	2003 FA_{136}	—	December 14, 2006	Kitt Peak	Spacewatch	·	1.5 km	MPC · JPL
680689	2003 FL_{136}	—	September 24, 2011	Haleakala	Pan-STARRS 1	EOS	1.5 km	MPC · JPL
680690	2003 FC_{137}	—	February 14, 2016	Haleakala	Pan-STARRS 1	H	430 m	MPC · JPL
680691	2003 FG_{138}	—	March 24, 2003	Kitt Peak	Spacewatch	·	880 m	MPC · JPL
680692	2003 FO_{138}	—	March 27, 2003	Kitt Peak	Spacewatch	KON	2.0 km	MPC · JPL
680693	2003 FZ_{138}	—	May 8, 2014	Haleakala	Pan-STARRS 1	EOS	1.4 km	MPC · JPL
680694	2003 FC_{139}	—	July 7, 2014	Haleakala	Pan-STARRS 1	·	750 m	MPC · JPL
680695	2003 FO_{140}	—	November 11, 2010	Mount Lemmon	Mount Lemmon Survey	AGN	1.1 km	MPC · JPL
680696	2003 FV_{140}	—	April 20, 2017	Haleakala	Pan-STARRS 1	·	430 m	MPC · JPL
680697	2003 FX_{140}	—	September 11, 2015	Haleakala	Pan-STARRS 1	KOR	1.0 km	MPC · JPL
680698	2003 FZ_{140}	—	March 12, 2010	Kitt Peak	Spacewatch	·	690 m	MPC · JPL
680699	2003 FB_{141}	—	September 21, 2011	Kitt Peak	Spacewatch	·	470 m	MPC · JPL
680700	2003 FP_{141}	—	March 23, 2003	Apache Point	SDSS Collaboration	·	990 m	MPC · JPL

== 680701–680800 ==
back to top

Designation			Discovery			Properties		Ref
Permanent	Provisional	Named after	Date	Site	Discoverer(s)	Category	Diam.	Ref
680701	2003 GB_{52}	—	October 10, 1994	Kitt Peak	Spacewatch	·	650 m	MPC · JPL
680702	2003 GR_{58}	—	February 10, 2010	Kitt Peak	Spacewatch	·	1.1 km	MPC · JPL
680703	2003 GM_{59}	—	October 20, 2011	Mount Lemmon	Mount Lemmon Survey	·	1.4 km	MPC · JPL
680704	2003 GW_{59}	—	November 1, 2015	Mount Lemmon	Mount Lemmon Survey	·	1.7 km	MPC · JPL
680705	2003 GA_{60}	—	October 12, 2010	Kitt Peak	Spacewatch	KOR	1.0 km	MPC · JPL
680706	2003 GB_{60}	—	February 20, 2015	Haleakala	Pan-STARRS 1	BRG	1.5 km	MPC · JPL
680707	2003 GM_{60}	—	December 14, 2015	Haleakala	Pan-STARRS 1	·	670 m	MPC · JPL
680708	2003 GS_{60}	—	April 9, 2010	Mount Lemmon	Mount Lemmon Survey	·	530 m	MPC · JPL
680709	2003 GW_{60}	—	November 3, 2015	Mount Lemmon	Mount Lemmon Survey	·	720 m	MPC · JPL
680710	2003 GC_{62}	—	September 18, 2012	Mount Lemmon	Mount Lemmon Survey	·	3.7 km	MPC · JPL
680711	2003 GF_{62}	—	February 17, 2013	Mount Lemmon	Mount Lemmon Survey	·	630 m	MPC · JPL
680712	2003 GK_{62}	—	April 8, 2003	Kitt Peak	Spacewatch	·	1.1 km	MPC · JPL
680713	2003 GZ_{62}	—	April 1, 2003	Apache Point	SDSS Collaboration	·	2.1 km	MPC · JPL
680714	2003 GM_{66}	—	April 1, 2003	Apache Point	SDSS	MAR	760 m	MPC · JPL
680715	2003 GV_{66}	—	April 10, 2003	Kitt Peak	Spacewatch	·	790 m	MPC · JPL
680716	2003 HU_{17}	—	April 25, 2003	Kitt Peak	Spacewatch	·	1.2 km	MPC · JPL
680717	2003 HB_{60}	—	April 15, 2008	Mount Lemmon	Mount Lemmon Survey	·	1.7 km	MPC · JPL
680718	2003 HK_{60}	—	April 30, 2014	Haleakala	Pan-STARRS 1	·	3.0 km	MPC · JPL
680719	2003 HQ_{60}	—	April 1, 2008	Mount Lemmon	Mount Lemmon Survey	EOS	1.5 km	MPC · JPL
680720	2003 HA_{62}	—	May 7, 2014	Haleakala	Pan-STARRS 1	H	470 m	MPC · JPL
680721	2003 HL_{62}	—	April 24, 2003	Kitt Peak	Spacewatch	(2076)	550 m	MPC · JPL
680722	2003 JM_{20}	—	May 1, 2003	Kitt Peak	Spacewatch	·	1.8 km	MPC · JPL
680723	2003 KJ_{40}	—	May 25, 2003	Kitt Peak	Spacewatch	·	1.1 km	MPC · JPL
680724	2003 LZ_{5}	—	June 7, 2003	Kitt Peak	Spacewatch	H	370 m	MPC · JPL
680725	2003 LP_{10}	—	October 19, 2017	Mount Lemmon	Mount Lemmon Survey	MAR	1.1 km	MPC · JPL
680726	2003 MH_{12}	—	June 29, 2003	Socorro	LINEAR	·	2.5 km	MPC · JPL
680727	2003 NC_{11}	—	July 3, 2003	Kitt Peak	Spacewatch	·	3.0 km	MPC · JPL
680728	2003 NS_{13}	—	July 4, 2016	Haleakala	Pan-STARRS 1	HNS	1.1 km	MPC · JPL
680729	2003 NU_{13}	—	January 16, 2015	Haleakala	Pan-STARRS 1	·	690 m	MPC · JPL
680730	2003 NK_{14}	—	October 15, 2007	Mount Lemmon	Mount Lemmon Survey	V	540 m	MPC · JPL
680731	2003 NT_{14}	—	January 28, 2015	Haleakala	Pan-STARRS 1	·	1.6 km	MPC · JPL
680732	2003 NY_{14}	—	July 5, 2003	Kitt Peak	Spacewatch	·	1.1 km	MPC · JPL
680733	2003 OG_{15}	—	July 23, 2003	Wise	Polishook, D.	TIR	2.6 km	MPC · JPL
680734	2003 OQ_{18}	—	July 8, 2003	Palomar	NEAT	·	2.7 km	MPC · JPL
680735	2003 OQ_{35}	—	July 23, 2003	Palomar	NEAT	·	2.9 km	MPC · JPL
680736	2003 PL_{10}	—	August 5, 2003	Kitt Peak	Spacewatch	·	1.1 km	MPC · JPL
680737	2003 PW_{10}	—	August 5, 2003	Kitt Peak	Spacewatch	·	1.1 km	MPC · JPL
680738	2003 QE_{28}	—	August 20, 2003	Saint-Sulpice	B. Christophe	·	440 m	MPC · JPL
680739	2003 QX_{85}	—	August 25, 2003	Cerro Tololo	Deep Ecliptic Survey	THM	1.9 km	MPC · JPL
680740	2003 QR_{92}	—	August 27, 2003	Palomar	NEAT	JUN	1.1 km	MPC · JPL
680741	2003 QV_{92}	—	August 27, 2003	Palomar	NEAT	(5)	1.2 km	MPC · JPL
680742	2003 QF_{98}	—	August 30, 2003	Kitt Peak	Spacewatch	·	2.2 km	MPC · JPL
680743	2003 QN_{118}	—	August 26, 2003	Cerro Tololo	Deep Ecliptic Survey	·	2.1 km	MPC · JPL
680744	2003 QP_{121}	—	October 10, 2016	Haleakala	Pan-STARRS 1	·	2.6 km	MPC · JPL
680745	2003 QW_{122}	—	September 1, 2014	Catalina	CSS	·	1.1 km	MPC · JPL
680746	2003 QA_{123}	—	August 20, 2003	Campo Imperatore	CINEOS	·	980 m	MPC · JPL
680747	2003 QL_{123}	—	November 28, 2013	Mount Lemmon	Mount Lemmon Survey	·	1.2 km	MPC · JPL
680748	2003 QE_{125}	—	August 26, 2003	Cerro Tololo	Deep Ecliptic Survey	·	1.2 km	MPC · JPL
680749	2003 QC_{126}	—	August 23, 2003	Palomar	NEAT	·	1.5 km	MPC · JPL
680750	2003 QY_{126}	—	February 23, 2012	Mount Lemmon	Mount Lemmon Survey	·	2.2 km	MPC · JPL
680751	2003 RD_{28}	—	September 4, 2003	Kitt Peak	Spacewatch	·	1.4 km	MPC · JPL
680752	2003 RE_{28}	—	September 4, 2003	Kitt Peak	Spacewatch	·	1.8 km	MPC · JPL
680753	2003 RO_{28}	—	March 21, 2015	Haleakala	Pan-STARRS 1	·	1.3 km	MPC · JPL
680754	2003 SG_{8}	—	September 16, 2003	Kitt Peak	Spacewatch	(12739)	1.3 km	MPC · JPL
680755	2003 SJ_{12}	—	September 16, 2003	Kitt Peak	Spacewatch	(5)	1.2 km	MPC · JPL
680756	2003 SX_{19}	—	September 16, 2003	Kitt Peak	Spacewatch	·	2.9 km	MPC · JPL
680757	2003 SF_{28}	—	September 18, 2003	Palomar	NEAT	·	2.4 km	MPC · JPL
680758	2003 SH_{35}	—	September 18, 2003	Kitt Peak	Spacewatch	H	370 m	MPC · JPL
680759	2003 SP_{63}	—	September 17, 2003	Kitt Peak	Spacewatch	·	1.5 km	MPC · JPL
680760	2003 SB_{68}	—	September 17, 2003	Kitt Peak	Spacewatch	H	490 m	MPC · JPL
680761	2003 SZ_{94}	—	September 19, 2003	Kitt Peak	Spacewatch	·	1.2 km	MPC · JPL
680762	2003 SU_{106}	—	September 20, 2003	Kitt Peak	Spacewatch	·	2.3 km	MPC · JPL
680763	2003 SU_{108}	—	September 21, 2003	Kitt Peak	Spacewatch	·	990 m	MPC · JPL
680764	2003 SN_{113}	—	September 16, 2003	Kitt Peak	Spacewatch	·	2.1 km	MPC · JPL
680765	2003 SF_{115}	—	September 16, 2003	Kitt Peak	Spacewatch	EOS	1.8 km	MPC · JPL
680766	2003 SC_{194}	—	September 20, 2003	Kitt Peak	Spacewatch	·	1.1 km	MPC · JPL
680767	2003 SH_{239}	—	September 18, 2003	Kitt Peak	Spacewatch	VER	2.5 km	MPC · JPL
680768	2003 SJ_{268}	—	September 29, 2003	Kitt Peak	Spacewatch	·	1.8 km	MPC · JPL
680769	2003 SZ_{278}	—	September 30, 2003	Kitt Peak	Spacewatch	·	1.1 km	MPC · JPL
680770	2003 SU_{301}	—	September 20, 2003	Kitt Peak	Spacewatch	·	2.5 km	MPC · JPL
680771	2003 SL_{311}	—	September 21, 2003	Kitt Peak	Spacewatch	TIR	2.5 km	MPC · JPL
680772	2003 SH_{335}	—	September 26, 2003	Apache Point	SDSS Collaboration	·	1.4 km	MPC · JPL
680773	2003 SY_{340}	—	September 16, 2003	Kitt Peak	Spacewatch	·	2.2 km	MPC · JPL
680774	2003 SC_{342}	—	September 17, 2003	Kitt Peak	Spacewatch	·	2.0 km	MPC · JPL
680775	2003 SG_{344}	—	September 17, 2003	Kitt Peak	Spacewatch	PHO	670 m	MPC · JPL
680776	2003 SS_{347}	—	September 18, 2003	Kitt Peak	Spacewatch	·	2.2 km	MPC · JPL
680777	2003 ST_{350}	—	September 19, 2003	Kitt Peak	Spacewatch	PHO	520 m	MPC · JPL
680778	2003 SF_{355}	—	September 25, 2003	Palomar	NEAT	·	860 m	MPC · JPL
680779	2003 SE_{361}	—	September 22, 2003	Kitt Peak	Spacewatch	·	870 m	MPC · JPL
680780	2003 SL_{364}	—	September 26, 2003	Apache Point	SDSS Collaboration	·	1.8 km	MPC · JPL
680781	2003 SK_{370}	—	September 26, 2003	Apache Point	SDSS Collaboration	·	2.1 km	MPC · JPL
680782	2003 SF_{373}	—	September 26, 2003	Apache Point	SDSS Collaboration	NYS	840 m	MPC · JPL
680783	2003 SM_{376}	—	September 26, 2003	Apache Point	SDSS Collaboration	·	1.3 km	MPC · JPL
680784	2003 SM_{380}	—	September 29, 2003	Kitt Peak	Spacewatch	·	1.2 km	MPC · JPL
680785	2003 SW_{380}	—	September 26, 2003	Apache Point	SDSS Collaboration	·	1.1 km	MPC · JPL
680786	2003 SP_{381}	—	September 26, 2003	Apache Point	SDSS Collaboration	MAS	780 m	MPC · JPL
680787	2003 SQ_{382}	—	September 30, 2003	Kitt Peak	Spacewatch	PHO	590 m	MPC · JPL
680788	2003 SY_{383}	—	September 26, 2003	Apache Point	SDSS Collaboration	·	2.3 km	MPC · JPL
680789	2003 SR_{385}	—	September 26, 2003	Apache Point	SDSS Collaboration	·	2.2 km	MPC · JPL
680790	2003 SE_{386}	—	September 26, 2003	Apache Point	SDSS Collaboration	·	860 m	MPC · JPL
680791	2003 ST_{392}	—	September 26, 2003	Apache Point	SDSS Collaboration	·	2.6 km	MPC · JPL
680792	2003 SK_{402}	—	September 26, 2003	Apache Point	SDSS Collaboration	·	1.5 km	MPC · JPL
680793	2003 SN_{403}	—	September 27, 2003	Kitt Peak	Spacewatch	EOS	1.5 km	MPC · JPL
680794	2003 SR_{404}	—	October 20, 2003	Kitt Peak	Spacewatch	·	2.9 km	MPC · JPL
680795	2003 SY_{405}	—	September 27, 2003	Apache Point	SDSS Collaboration	·	2.5 km	MPC · JPL
680796	2003 SU_{406}	—	September 27, 2003	Apache Point	SDSS	·	2.6 km	MPC · JPL
680797	2003 SU_{407}	—	September 27, 2003	Apache Point	SDSS Collaboration	·	2.5 km	MPC · JPL
680798	2003 SR_{410}	—	September 28, 2003	Kitt Peak	Spacewatch	AST	1.2 km	MPC · JPL
680799	2003 SE_{417}	—	October 5, 2003	Kitt Peak	Spacewatch	·	900 m	MPC · JPL
680800	2003 SG_{422}	—	September 26, 2003	Apache Point	SDSS Collaboration	MAR	780 m	MPC · JPL

== 680801–680900 ==
back to top

Designation			Discovery			Properties		Ref
Permanent	Provisional	Named after	Date	Site	Discoverer(s)	Category	Diam.	Ref
680801	2003 SJ_{425}	—	September 26, 2003	Apache Point	SDSS Collaboration	·	1.1 km	MPC · JPL
680802	2003 SB_{434}	—	October 2, 2003	Kitt Peak	Spacewatch	·	1.5 km	MPC · JPL
680803	2003 SE_{435}	—	September 4, 2014	Haleakala	Pan-STARRS 1	·	2.6 km	MPC · JPL
680804	2003 SU_{436}	—	April 18, 2012	Kitt Peak	Spacewatch	·	2.4 km	MPC · JPL
680805	2003 SC_{438}	—	April 18, 2007	Mount Lemmon	Mount Lemmon Survey	·	2.1 km	MPC · JPL
680806	2003 SN_{438}	—	December 6, 2008	Kitt Peak	Spacewatch	·	1.1 km	MPC · JPL
680807	2003 SV_{439}	—	September 19, 2014	Haleakala	Pan-STARRS 1	MAS	650 m	MPC · JPL
680808	2003 SY_{442}	—	September 21, 2012	Kitt Peak	Spacewatch	·	1.2 km	MPC · JPL
680809	2003 SO_{443}	—	January 19, 2012	Haleakala	Pan-STARRS 1	·	2.3 km	MPC · JPL
680810	2003 SR_{445}	—	September 15, 2006	Kitt Peak	Spacewatch	·	810 m	MPC · JPL
680811	2003 SP_{447}	—	September 30, 2003	Kitt Peak	Spacewatch	·	1.5 km	MPC · JPL
680812	2003 SY_{449}	—	September 20, 2003	Kitt Peak	Spacewatch	·	850 m	MPC · JPL
680813	2003 SL_{451}	—	February 29, 2012	Mount Lemmon	Mount Lemmon Survey	·	2.3 km	MPC · JPL
680814	2003 ST_{451}	—	April 27, 2012	Haleakala	Pan-STARRS 1	·	2.1 km	MPC · JPL
680815	2003 SK_{452}	—	September 18, 2003	Kitt Peak	Spacewatch	·	1.5 km	MPC · JPL
680816	2003 SM_{452}	—	February 1, 2012	Mount Lemmon	Mount Lemmon Survey	·	2.2 km	MPC · JPL
680817	2003 SF_{453}	—	May 19, 2018	Haleakala	Pan-STARRS 1	·	2.0 km	MPC · JPL
680818	2003 SH_{454}	—	September 29, 2003	Kitt Peak	Spacewatch	·	880 m	MPC · JPL
680819	2003 ST_{457}	—	March 24, 2012	Mount Lemmon	Mount Lemmon Survey	·	2.2 km	MPC · JPL
680820	2003 SE_{458}	—	October 26, 2009	Mount Lemmon	Mount Lemmon Survey	·	2.3 km	MPC · JPL
680821	2003 SF_{458}	—	September 18, 2003	Kitt Peak	Spacewatch	·	590 m	MPC · JPL
680822	2003 SL_{458}	—	January 30, 2011	Kitt Peak	Spacewatch	·	2.8 km	MPC · JPL
680823	2003 SQ_{459}	—	June 1, 2011	ESA OGS	ESA OGS	·	880 m	MPC · JPL
680824	2003 SZ_{459}	—	August 24, 2012	Kitt Peak	Spacewatch	·	1.6 km	MPC · JPL
680825	2003 SH_{460}	—	October 13, 2017	Mount Lemmon	Mount Lemmon Survey	·	1.6 km	MPC · JPL
680826	2003 SB_{461}	—	August 24, 2008	Kitt Peak	Spacewatch	·	1.5 km	MPC · JPL
680827	2003 SK_{461}	—	August 25, 2014	Haleakala	Pan-STARRS 1	THM	1.8 km	MPC · JPL
680828	2003 SU_{461}	—	February 2, 2006	Mount Lemmon	Mount Lemmon Survey	·	2.2 km	MPC · JPL
680829	2003 SK_{463}	—	October 27, 2008	Kitt Peak	Spacewatch	·	1.5 km	MPC · JPL
680830	2003 SG_{464}	—	September 21, 2003	Kitt Peak	Spacewatch	·	850 m	MPC · JPL
680831	2003 SU_{465}	—	September 28, 2003	Kitt Peak	Spacewatch	·	1.2 km	MPC · JPL
680832	2003 SJ_{468}	—	September 17, 2003	Kitt Peak	Spacewatch	VER	2.0 km	MPC · JPL
680833	2003 SB_{469}	—	September 30, 2003	Kitt Peak	Spacewatch	·	2.4 km	MPC · JPL
680834	2003 SU_{469}	—	September 22, 2003	Kitt Peak	Spacewatch	·	1.8 km	MPC · JPL
680835	2003 SP_{472}	—	September 18, 2003	Kitt Peak	Spacewatch	·	710 m	MPC · JPL
680836	2003 SG_{477}	—	September 28, 2003	Kitt Peak	Spacewatch	·	1.9 km	MPC · JPL
680837	2003 SR_{477}	—	September 20, 2003	Kitt Peak	Spacewatch	·	1.2 km	MPC · JPL
680838	2003 TD_{24}	—	October 1, 2003	Kitt Peak	Spacewatch	·	1.6 km	MPC · JPL
680839	2003 TV_{24}	—	October 1, 2003	Kitt Peak	Spacewatch	·	2.4 km	MPC · JPL
680840	2003 TS_{27}	—	October 1, 2003	Kitt Peak	Spacewatch	3:2	5.3 km	MPC · JPL
680841	2003 TU_{28}	—	October 1, 2003	Kitt Peak	Spacewatch	·	1.4 km	MPC · JPL
680842	2003 TM_{33}	—	October 1, 2003	Kitt Peak	Spacewatch	LIX	2.5 km	MPC · JPL
680843	2003 TV_{33}	—	October 1, 2003	Kitt Peak	Spacewatch	·	1.6 km	MPC · JPL
680844	2003 TM_{34}	—	October 1, 2003	Kitt Peak	Spacewatch	·	1.1 km	MPC · JPL
680845	2003 TW_{44}	—	October 3, 2003	Kitt Peak	Spacewatch	PHO	630 m	MPC · JPL
680846	2003 TX_{44}	—	October 3, 2003	Kitt Peak	Spacewatch	·	1.1 km	MPC · JPL
680847	2003 TS_{60}	—	May 29, 2008	Mount Lemmon	Mount Lemmon Survey	·	2.9 km	MPC · JPL
680848	2003 TU_{62}	—	September 19, 1998	Apache Point	SDSS	EOS	1.3 km	MPC · JPL
680849	2003 TV_{62}	—	October 1, 2003	Kitt Peak	Spacewatch	(5)	1.2 km	MPC · JPL
680850	2003 TF_{63}	—	July 27, 2014	Haleakala	Pan-STARRS 1	·	1.1 km	MPC · JPL
680851	2003 TN_{63}	—	October 8, 2012	Haleakala	Pan-STARRS 1	·	1.4 km	MPC · JPL
680852	2003 TZ_{65}	—	October 2, 2003	Kitt Peak	Spacewatch	·	580 m	MPC · JPL
680853	2003 UK_{10}	—	October 18, 2003	Palomar	NEAT	·	1.8 km	MPC · JPL
680854	2003 UW_{12}	—	September 20, 2003	Palomar	NEAT	·	2.8 km	MPC · JPL
680855	2003 UE_{31}	—	October 16, 2003	Kitt Peak	Spacewatch	VER	2.3 km	MPC · JPL
680856	2003 UQ_{31}	—	September 28, 2003	Kitt Peak	Spacewatch	·	1.2 km	MPC · JPL
680857	2003 US_{68}	—	October 18, 2003	Kitt Peak	Spacewatch	·	1.2 km	MPC · JPL
680858	2003 UO_{69}	—	October 18, 2003	Kitt Peak	Spacewatch	·	1.0 km	MPC · JPL
680859	2003 UE_{73}	—	October 19, 2003	Kitt Peak	Spacewatch	·	870 m	MPC · JPL
680860	2003 UL_{103}	—	October 20, 2003	Kitt Peak	Spacewatch	·	1.3 km	MPC · JPL
680861	2003 UK_{124}	—	September 25, 2003	Palomar	NEAT	NAE	2.4 km	MPC · JPL
680862	2003 UX_{176}	—	October 16, 2003	Kitt Peak	Spacewatch	MAR	990 m	MPC · JPL
680863	2003 UF_{199}	—	September 28, 2003	Kitt Peak	Spacewatch	·	1.8 km	MPC · JPL
680864	2003 UU_{233}	—	October 16, 2003	Kitt Peak	Spacewatch	DOR	1.7 km	MPC · JPL
680865	2003 UD_{239}	—	September 22, 2003	Kitt Peak	Spacewatch	·	1.7 km	MPC · JPL
680866	2003 UY_{269}	—	October 24, 2003	Bergisch Gladbach	W. Bickel	MRX	780 m	MPC · JPL
680867	2003 UT_{294}	—	October 16, 2003	Kitt Peak	Spacewatch	EOS	1.7 km	MPC · JPL
680868	2003 US_{304}	—	October 18, 2003	Kitt Peak	Spacewatch	·	1.8 km	MPC · JPL
680869	2003 UM_{307}	—	October 18, 2003	Kitt Peak	Spacewatch	AGN	830 m	MPC · JPL
680870	2003 UW_{309}	—	October 16, 2003	Palomar	NEAT	·	3.4 km	MPC · JPL
680871	2003 UR_{310}	—	September 30, 2003	Kitt Peak	Spacewatch	EOS	1.6 km	MPC · JPL
680872	2003 UU_{321}	—	September 28, 2003	Kitt Peak	Spacewatch	·	990 m	MPC · JPL
680873	2003 UP_{322}	—	October 16, 2003	Kitt Peak	Spacewatch	·	2.4 km	MPC · JPL
680874	2003 UK_{323}	—	September 27, 2003	Kitt Peak	Spacewatch	3:2	4.2 km	MPC · JPL
680875	2003 UO_{325}	—	September 17, 2003	Kitt Peak	Spacewatch	·	2.1 km	MPC · JPL
680876	2003 UD_{327}	—	October 17, 2003	Apache Point	SDSS Collaboration	·	1.4 km	MPC · JPL
680877	2003 UU_{329}	—	September 18, 2003	Kitt Peak	Spacewatch	·	1.1 km	MPC · JPL
680878	2003 UC_{330}	—	October 17, 2003	Kitt Peak	Spacewatch	AGN	980 m	MPC · JPL
680879	2003 UN_{330}	—	October 17, 2003	Kitt Peak	Spacewatch	EOS	1.8 km	MPC · JPL
680880	2003 UA_{335}	—	October 18, 2003	Apache Point	SDSS Collaboration	·	780 m	MPC · JPL
680881	2003 UX_{341}	—	September 4, 2003	Kitt Peak	Spacewatch	H	440 m	MPC · JPL
680882	2003 UW_{346}	—	October 19, 2003	Apache Point	SDSS Collaboration	THM	2.3 km	MPC · JPL
680883	2003 UL_{348}	—	October 19, 2003	Apache Point	SDSS Collaboration	·	1.4 km	MPC · JPL
680884	2003 UE_{353}	—	October 19, 2003	Apache Point	SDSS Collaboration	·	2.3 km	MPC · JPL
680885	2003 UV_{354}	—	October 19, 2003	Kitt Peak	Spacewatch	H	380 m	MPC · JPL
680886	2003 UV_{362}	—	October 20, 2003	Kitt Peak	Spacewatch	·	1.5 km	MPC · JPL
680887	2003 UO_{364}	—	February 2, 2005	Kitt Peak	Spacewatch	·	2.4 km	MPC · JPL
680888	2003 US_{368}	—	October 21, 2003	Kitt Peak	Spacewatch	·	2.8 km	MPC · JPL
680889	2003 UB_{373}	—	October 22, 2003	Apache Point	SDSS	·	1.9 km	MPC · JPL
680890	2003 UE_{375}	—	September 26, 2003	Apache Point	SDSS Collaboration	·	1.9 km	MPC · JPL
680891	2003 UZ_{385}	—	October 22, 2003	Apache Point	SDSS	·	850 m	MPC · JPL
680892	2003 UP_{391}	—	October 22, 2003	Apache Point	SDSS Collaboration	EOS	1.7 km	MPC · JPL
680893	2003 UN_{392}	—	October 22, 2003	Apache Point	SDSS Collaboration	·	2.5 km	MPC · JPL
680894	2003 UH_{394}	—	October 22, 2003	Apache Point	SDSS	KON	2.2 km	MPC · JPL
680895	2003 UB_{395}	—	October 22, 2003	Apache Point	SDSS	·	1.5 km	MPC · JPL
680896	2003 UL_{396}	—	October 22, 2003	Apache Point	SDSS Collaboration	EOS	1.7 km	MPC · JPL
680897	2003 UW_{396}	—	October 22, 2003	Apache Point	SDSS Collaboration	·	1.5 km	MPC · JPL
680898	2003 UB_{398}	—	January 19, 2005	Kitt Peak	Spacewatch	EOS	1.8 km	MPC · JPL
680899	2003 UX_{400}	—	September 27, 2003	Kitt Peak	Spacewatch	·	1.6 km	MPC · JPL
680900	2003 UB_{405}	—	October 23, 2003	Apache Point	SDSS Collaboration	·	680 m	MPC · JPL

== 680901–681000 ==
back to top

Designation			Discovery			Properties		Ref
Permanent	Provisional	Named after	Date	Site	Discoverer(s)	Category	Diam.	Ref
680901	2003 US_{407}	—	October 23, 2003	Apache Point	SDSS Collaboration	PAD	1.2 km	MPC · JPL
680902	2003 UH_{410}	—	October 23, 2003	Apache Point	SDSS Collaboration	·	2.4 km	MPC · JPL
680903	2003 UO_{410}	—	October 23, 2003	Apache Point	SDSS Collaboration	PHO	630 m	MPC · JPL
680904	2003 UW_{410}	—	October 23, 2003	Apache Point	SDSS Collaboration	·	1.5 km	MPC · JPL
680905	2003 UX_{411}	—	October 23, 2003	Apache Point	SDSS Collaboration	·	2.8 km	MPC · JPL
680906	2003 UX_{416}	—	October 23, 2003	Apache Point	SDSS Collaboration	·	1.4 km	MPC · JPL
680907	2003 UA_{420}	—	October 7, 2008	Mount Lemmon	Mount Lemmon Survey	·	1.9 km	MPC · JPL
680908	2003 UH_{420}	—	January 30, 2011	Kitt Peak	Spacewatch	·	2.2 km	MPC · JPL
680909	2003 UE_{421}	—	October 7, 1996	Kitt Peak	Spacewatch	·	880 m	MPC · JPL
680910	2003 UA_{422}	—	October 19, 2003	Kitt Peak	Spacewatch	·	980 m	MPC · JPL
680911	2003 UA_{424}	—	September 18, 2014	Haleakala	Pan-STARRS 1	·	2.7 km	MPC · JPL
680912	2003 UB_{424}	—	December 5, 2008	Kitt Peak	Spacewatch	·	1.5 km	MPC · JPL
680913	2003 UF_{424}	—	October 21, 2003	Kitt Peak	Spacewatch	·	1.7 km	MPC · JPL
680914	2003 UK_{424}	—	December 25, 2013	Mount Lemmon	Mount Lemmon Survey	·	1.6 km	MPC · JPL
680915	2003 UL_{424}	—	October 13, 2014	Mount Lemmon	Mount Lemmon Survey	·	2.5 km	MPC · JPL
680916	2003 UO_{424}	—	October 8, 2012	Haleakala	Pan-STARRS 1	·	1.4 km	MPC · JPL
680917	2003 US_{424}	—	February 26, 2014	Haleakala	Pan-STARRS 1	·	1.2 km	MPC · JPL
680918	2003 UD_{426}	—	September 6, 2008	Mount Lemmon	Mount Lemmon Survey	·	2.1 km	MPC · JPL
680919	2003 UE_{426}	—	March 23, 2012	Mount Lemmon	Mount Lemmon Survey	VER	2.0 km	MPC · JPL
680920	2003 UF_{426}	—	October 17, 2012	Haleakala	Pan-STARRS 1	·	1.3 km	MPC · JPL
680921	2003 UU_{426}	—	April 25, 2015	Haleakala	Pan-STARRS 1	·	1.4 km	MPC · JPL
680922	2003 UE_{427}	—	October 5, 2012	Haleakala	Pan-STARRS 1	·	1.5 km	MPC · JPL
680923	2003 UW_{428}	—	March 23, 2006	Mount Lemmon	Mount Lemmon Survey	·	1.3 km	MPC · JPL
680924	2003 UC_{430}	—	March 17, 2015	Haleakala	Pan-STARRS 1	·	1.2 km	MPC · JPL
680925	2003 UF_{430}	—	April 14, 2015	Mount Lemmon	Mount Lemmon Survey	·	1.3 km	MPC · JPL
680926	2003 UJ_{430}	—	October 17, 2012	Haleakala	Pan-STARRS 1	·	1.3 km	MPC · JPL
680927	2003 UW_{431}	—	October 23, 2003	Apache Point	SDSS Collaboration	·	2.5 km	MPC · JPL
680928	2003 UE_{432}	—	December 15, 2009	Mount Lemmon	Mount Lemmon Survey	·	2.1 km	MPC · JPL
680929	2003 UF_{432}	—	June 5, 2014	Haleakala	Pan-STARRS 1	·	1.1 km	MPC · JPL
680930	2003 UX_{432}	—	September 25, 2014	Kitt Peak	Spacewatch	·	2.7 km	MPC · JPL
680931	2003 UC_{433}	—	January 27, 2011	Mount Lemmon	Mount Lemmon Survey	EOS	1.7 km	MPC · JPL
680932	2003 UA_{434}	—	April 15, 2018	Mount Lemmon	Mount Lemmon Survey	VER	2.7 km	MPC · JPL
680933	2003 UR_{434}	—	September 4, 2007	Mount Lemmon	Mount Lemmon Survey	·	1.2 km	MPC · JPL
680934	2003 UN_{435}	—	January 10, 2014	Mount Lemmon	Mount Lemmon Survey	·	1.5 km	MPC · JPL
680935	2003 UA_{438}	—	November 21, 2009	Kitt Peak	Spacewatch	EOS	1.9 km	MPC · JPL
680936	2003 UH_{438}	—	October 1, 2014	Haleakala	Pan-STARRS 1	·	2.2 km	MPC · JPL
680937	2003 UL_{438}	—	June 19, 2013	Haleakala	Pan-STARRS 1	·	2.1 km	MPC · JPL
680938	2003 UN_{438}	—	March 13, 2010	Mount Lemmon	Mount Lemmon Survey	·	1.6 km	MPC · JPL
680939	2003 UP_{440}	—	October 16, 2003	Kitt Peak	Spacewatch	·	1.3 km	MPC · JPL
680940	2003 UP_{441}	—	September 24, 2008	Mount Lemmon	Mount Lemmon Survey	·	2.0 km	MPC · JPL
680941	2003 UW_{443}	—	March 28, 2015	Haleakala	Pan-STARRS 1	·	1.4 km	MPC · JPL
680942	2003 UF_{444}	—	October 29, 2003	Kitt Peak	Spacewatch	·	1.5 km	MPC · JPL
680943	2003 UO_{444}	—	October 16, 2003	Palomar	NEAT	·	1.3 km	MPC · JPL
680944	2003 UW_{444}	—	October 21, 2003	Kitt Peak	Spacewatch	·	2.7 km	MPC · JPL
680945	2003 UA_{445}	—	October 22, 2003	Kitt Peak	Spacewatch	AST	1.3 km	MPC · JPL
680946	2003 UC_{445}	—	October 18, 2003	Kitt Peak	Spacewatch	·	1.4 km	MPC · JPL
680947	2003 UH_{446}	—	October 21, 2003	Kitt Peak	Spacewatch	·	1.2 km	MPC · JPL
680948	2003 UJ_{447}	—	October 18, 2003	Apache Point	SDSS Collaboration	·	2.0 km	MPC · JPL
680949	2003 UO_{449}	—	October 22, 2003	Apache Point	SDSS	·	1.6 km	MPC · JPL
680950	2003 VB_{7}	—	November 15, 2003	Kitt Peak	Spacewatch	·	1.5 km	MPC · JPL
680951	2003 WJ_{8}	—	November 16, 2003	Kitt Peak	Spacewatch	·	590 m	MPC · JPL
680952	2003 WK_{54}	—	November 20, 2003	Socorro	LINEAR	MAR	1.1 km	MPC · JPL
680953	2003 WO_{96}	—	November 16, 2003	Kitt Peak	Spacewatch	·	1.1 km	MPC · JPL
680954	2003 WD_{106}	—	November 21, 2003	Kitt Peak	Spacewatch	·	1.5 km	MPC · JPL
680955	2003 WG_{174}	—	October 23, 2003	Kitt Peak	Spacewatch	·	950 m	MPC · JPL
680956	2003 WN_{179}	—	November 20, 2003	Kitt Peak	Spacewatch	·	1.8 km	MPC · JPL
680957	2003 WW_{183}	—	November 20, 2003	Kitt Peak	Deep Ecliptic Survey	·	550 m	MPC · JPL
680958	2003 WW_{184}	—	November 20, 2003	Kitt Peak	Spacewatch	·	770 m	MPC · JPL
680959	2003 WF_{187}	—	November 23, 2003	Kitt Peak	Deep Ecliptic Survey	·	2.1 km	MPC · JPL
680960	2003 WG_{197}	—	October 13, 2007	Mount Lemmon	Mount Lemmon Survey	·	1.6 km	MPC · JPL
680961	2003 WO_{197}	—	January 4, 2014	Mount Lemmon	Mount Lemmon Survey	·	1.6 km	MPC · JPL
680962	2003 WQ_{198}	—	November 16, 2003	Kitt Peak	Spacewatch	(18466)	2.0 km	MPC · JPL
680963	2003 WR_{198}	—	October 20, 2007	Mount Lemmon	Mount Lemmon Survey	·	810 m	MPC · JPL
680964	2003 WT_{198}	—	February 13, 2011	Mount Lemmon	Mount Lemmon Survey	·	2.3 km	MPC · JPL
680965	2003 WQ_{199}	—	August 3, 2016	Haleakala	Pan-STARRS 1	MRX	730 m	MPC · JPL
680966	2003 WH_{200}	—	March 27, 2015	Kitt Peak	Spacewatch	·	1.2 km	MPC · JPL
680967	2003 WV_{200}	—	March 11, 2013	Mount Lemmon	Mount Lemmon Survey	·	1.2 km	MPC · JPL
680968	2003 WA_{201}	—	August 30, 2014	Haleakala	Pan-STARRS 1	CLA	1.4 km	MPC · JPL
680969	2003 WN_{201}	—	May 2, 2006	Mount Lemmon	Mount Lemmon Survey	AEO	960 m	MPC · JPL
680970	2003 WT_{201}	—	April 19, 2012	Mount Lemmon	Mount Lemmon Survey	·	2.4 km	MPC · JPL
680971	2003 WG_{202}	—	February 12, 2011	Mount Lemmon	Mount Lemmon Survey	·	2.0 km	MPC · JPL
680972	2003 WY_{202}	—	September 18, 2014	Haleakala	Pan-STARRS 1	·	1.1 km	MPC · JPL
680973	2003 WA_{203}	—	November 16, 2003	Kitt Peak	Spacewatch	·	1.7 km	MPC · JPL
680974	2003 WP_{203}	—	November 21, 2003	Kitt Peak	Spacewatch	·	1.4 km	MPC · JPL
680975	2003 WB_{204}	—	February 1, 2012	Mount Lemmon	Mount Lemmon Survey	·	930 m	MPC · JPL
680976	2003 WW_{205}	—	September 23, 2008	Kitt Peak	Spacewatch	EOS	1.7 km	MPC · JPL
680977	2003 WL_{206}	—	October 25, 2008	Kitt Peak	Spacewatch	·	2.2 km	MPC · JPL
680978	2003 WF_{208}	—	February 29, 2016	Haleakala	Pan-STARRS 1	·	930 m	MPC · JPL
680979	2003 WR_{208}	—	February 6, 2014	Catalina	CSS	·	1.9 km	MPC · JPL
680980	2003 WT_{209}	—	April 15, 2013	Haleakala	Pan-STARRS 1	NYS	790 m	MPC · JPL
680981	2003 WE_{211}	—	June 10, 2007	Kitt Peak	Spacewatch	THM	2.1 km	MPC · JPL
680982	2003 WQ_{212}	—	January 10, 2014	Kitt Peak	Spacewatch	MRX	860 m	MPC · JPL
680983	2003 WR_{213}	—	October 18, 2012	Haleakala	Pan-STARRS 1	HOF	2.1 km	MPC · JPL
680984	2003 WQ_{214}	—	November 30, 2003	Kitt Peak	Spacewatch	·	1.8 km	MPC · JPL
680985	2003 WT_{214}	—	November 21, 2003	Kitt Peak	Spacewatch	NYS	910 m	MPC · JPL
680986	2003 WD_{215}	—	November 20, 2003	Kitt Peak	Spacewatch	·	1.4 km	MPC · JPL
680987	2003 WZ_{215}	—	November 20, 2003	Kitt Peak	Spacewatch	·	2.2 km	MPC · JPL
680988	2003 WZ_{217}	—	November 16, 2003	Kitt Peak	Spacewatch	MAS	580 m	MPC · JPL
680989	2003 XO_{1}	—	December 1, 2003	Kitt Peak	Spacewatch	·	1.4 km	MPC · JPL
680990	2003 XA_{31}	—	November 19, 2003	Kitt Peak	Spacewatch	·	2.5 km	MPC · JPL
680991	2003 XF_{44}	—	December 1, 2003	Kitt Peak	Spacewatch	·	570 m	MPC · JPL
680992	2003 XP_{44}	—	November 17, 2014	Mount Lemmon	Mount Lemmon Survey	·	2.6 km	MPC · JPL
680993	2003 XK_{46}	—	September 25, 2012	Kitt Peak	Spacewatch	·	1.6 km	MPC · JPL
680994	2003 YS_{46}	—	November 19, 2003	Kitt Peak	Spacewatch	·	3.4 km	MPC · JPL
680995	2003 YV_{121}	—	December 25, 2003	Kitt Peak	Spacewatch	·	3.1 km	MPC · JPL
680996	2003 YX_{173}	—	December 14, 2003	Kitt Peak	Spacewatch	·	1.6 km	MPC · JPL
680997	2003 YY_{174}	—	December 19, 2003	Socorro	LINEAR	·	1.1 km	MPC · JPL
680998	2003 YZ_{182}	—	December 21, 2003	Kitt Peak	Spacewatch	EOS	1.7 km	MPC · JPL
680999	2003 YB_{184}	—	February 14, 2012	Haleakala	Pan-STARRS 1	·	830 m	MPC · JPL
681000	2003 YH_{184}	—	August 27, 2016	Haleakala	Pan-STARRS 1	·	1.8 km	MPC · JPL

back to top
