= List of minor planets: 637001–638000 =

The following is a partial list of minor planets, running from minor-planet number 637001 through 638000, inclusive. The primary data for this and other partial lists is based on JPL's "Small-Body Orbital Elements" and data available from the Minor Planet Center. Critical list information is also provided by the MPC, unless otherwise specified from Lowell Observatory. A detailed description of the table's columns and additional sources are given on the main page including a complete list of every page in this series, and a statistical break-up on the dynamical classification of minor planets.

Also see the summary list of all named bodies in numerical and alphabetical order, and the corresponding naming citations for the number range of this particular list. New namings may only be added to this list after official publication, as the preannouncement of names is condemned by the Working Group for Small Bodies Nomenclature of the International Astronomical Union.

| Near-Earth obj. | MBA (inner) | MBA (outer) | Centaur |
| Mars-crosser | MBA (middle) | Jupiter trojan | Trans-Neptunian obj. |
| Unclassified |

== 637001–637100 ==
| Designation | | | Discovery | | | Properties | | Ref |
| Permanent | Provisional | Named after | Date | Site | Discoverer(s) | Category | Diam. | Ref |
|---|---|---|---|---|---|---|---|---|
| 637001 | 2015 BA_{142} | — | January 17, 2015 | Haleakala | Pan-STARRS 1 | EOS | 1.5 km | MPC · JPL |
| 637002 | 2015 BC_{156} | — | November 9, 2013 | Haleakala | Pan-STARRS 1 | · | 2.8 km | MPC · JPL |
| 637003 | 2015 BV_{156} | — | December 31, 2007 | Mount Lemmon | Mount Lemmon Survey | · | 760 m | MPC · JPL |
| 637004 | 2015 BO_{160} | — | January 17, 2015 | Haleakala | Pan-STARRS 1 | · | 2.5 km | MPC · JPL |
| 637005 | 2015 BU_{166} | — | May 21, 2011 | Mount Lemmon | Mount Lemmon Survey | · | 1.9 km | MPC · JPL |
| 637006 | 2015 BL_{169} | — | January 17, 2015 | Haleakala | Pan-STARRS 1 | · | 2.4 km | MPC · JPL |
| 637007 | 2015 BZ_{169} | — | October 24, 2013 | Mount Lemmon | Mount Lemmon Survey | KOR | 970 m | MPC · JPL |
| 637008 | 2015 BE_{171} | — | February 14, 2010 | Mount Lemmon | Mount Lemmon Survey | · | 1.4 km | MPC · JPL |
| 637009 | 2015 BA_{177} | — | June 4, 2011 | Mount Lemmon | Mount Lemmon Survey | EOS | 1.6 km | MPC · JPL |
| 637010 | 2015 BS_{185} | — | January 17, 2015 | Haleakala | Pan-STARRS 1 | · | 2.0 km | MPC · JPL |
| 637011 | 2015 BK_{187} | — | March 21, 2002 | Kitt Peak | Spacewatch | · | 710 m | MPC · JPL |
| 637012 | 2015 BP_{189} | — | November 30, 2008 | Mount Lemmon | Mount Lemmon Survey | · | 2.7 km | MPC · JPL |
| 637013 | 2015 BZ_{189} | — | November 7, 2007 | Mount Lemmon | Mount Lemmon Survey | · | 550 m | MPC · JPL |
| 637014 | 2015 BA_{193} | — | January 17, 2015 | Haleakala | Pan-STARRS 1 | EOS | 1.7 km | MPC · JPL |
| 637015 | 2015 BX_{193} | — | December 30, 2007 | Mount Lemmon | Mount Lemmon Survey | · | 680 m | MPC · JPL |
| 637016 | 2015 BN_{197} | — | October 3, 2013 | Haleakala | Pan-STARRS 1 | · | 1.5 km | MPC · JPL |
| 637017 | 2015 BX_{197} | — | January 17, 2015 | Haleakala | Pan-STARRS 1 | · | 1.7 km | MPC · JPL |
| 637018 | 2015 BS_{205} | — | August 28, 2005 | Kitt Peak | Spacewatch | · | 1.4 km | MPC · JPL |
| 637019 | 2015 BE_{209} | — | October 7, 2004 | Kitt Peak | Spacewatch | · | 630 m | MPC · JPL |
| 637020 | 2015 BQ_{209} | — | April 30, 2011 | Kitt Peak | Spacewatch | EOS | 1.8 km | MPC · JPL |
| 637021 | 2015 BY_{215} | — | November 20, 2008 | Kitt Peak | Spacewatch | · | 2.1 km | MPC · JPL |
| 637022 | 2015 BE_{222} | — | November 25, 2009 | Mount Lemmon | Mount Lemmon Survey | · | 1.5 km | MPC · JPL |
| 637023 | 2015 BL_{222} | — | April 17, 2009 | Kitt Peak | Spacewatch | · | 630 m | MPC · JPL |
| 637024 | 2015 BW_{227} | — | November 10, 2009 | Kitt Peak | Spacewatch | · | 1.5 km | MPC · JPL |
| 637025 | 2015 BB_{229} | — | August 13, 2006 | Palomar | NEAT | · | 970 m | MPC · JPL |
| 637026 | 2015 BU_{231} | — | December 1, 2008 | Catalina | CSS | · | 3.2 km | MPC · JPL |
| 637027 | 2015 BJ_{232} | — | January 11, 2010 | Kitt Peak | Spacewatch | · | 2.0 km | MPC · JPL |
| 637028 | 2015 BN_{233} | — | September 1, 2013 | Haleakala | Pan-STARRS 1 | · | 1.6 km | MPC · JPL |
| 637029 | 2015 BQ_{233} | — | January 18, 2015 | Haleakala | Pan-STARRS 1 | · | 1.3 km | MPC · JPL |
| 637030 | 2015 BD_{234} | — | March 9, 2002 | Palomar | NEAT | · | 2.5 km | MPC · JPL |
| 637031 | 2015 BB_{235} | — | April 13, 2002 | Kitt Peak | Spacewatch | · | 770 m | MPC · JPL |
| 637032 | 2015 BE_{235} | — | September 14, 2006 | Palomar | NEAT | · | 770 m | MPC · JPL |
| 637033 | 2015 BH_{235} | — | August 10, 2007 | Kitt Peak | Spacewatch | · | 2.6 km | MPC · JPL |
| 637034 | 2015 BJ_{236} | — | January 30, 2008 | Mount Lemmon | Mount Lemmon Survey | · | 870 m | MPC · JPL |
| 637035 | 2015 BD_{240} | — | October 26, 2009 | Mount Lemmon | Mount Lemmon Survey | · | 2.2 km | MPC · JPL |
| 637036 | 2015 BR_{240} | — | August 24, 2003 | Palomar | NEAT | · | 2.1 km | MPC · JPL |
| 637037 | 2015 BQ_{241} | — | February 12, 2004 | Kitt Peak | Spacewatch | · | 2.8 km | MPC · JPL |
| 637038 | 2015 BO_{244} | — | May 25, 2006 | Mauna Kea | P. A. Wiegert | · | 1.7 km | MPC · JPL |
| 637039 | 2015 BS_{245} | — | January 18, 2015 | Haleakala | Pan-STARRS 1 | WIT | 900 m | MPC · JPL |
| 637040 | 2015 BA_{247} | — | October 17, 2007 | Mount Lemmon | Mount Lemmon Survey | · | 730 m | MPC · JPL |
| 637041 | 2015 BV_{252} | — | January 18, 2015 | Haleakala | Pan-STARRS 1 | · | 2.3 km | MPC · JPL |
| 637042 | 2015 BV_{255} | — | February 29, 2012 | Mount Lemmon | Mount Lemmon Survey | · | 610 m | MPC · JPL |
| 637043 | 2015 BP_{258} | — | March 27, 2012 | Mount Lemmon | Mount Lemmon Survey | · | 520 m | MPC · JPL |
| 637044 | 2015 BX_{259} | — | October 19, 2006 | Catalina | CSS | · | 1.3 km | MPC · JPL |
| 637045 | 2015 BF_{260} | — | January 17, 2004 | Kitt Peak | Spacewatch | · | 2.2 km | MPC · JPL |
| 637046 | 2015 BU_{271} | — | March 23, 2012 | Mount Lemmon | Mount Lemmon Survey | · | 640 m | MPC · JPL |
| 637047 | 2015 BM_{274} | — | March 3, 2005 | Catalina | CSS | EOS | 1.8 km | MPC · JPL |
| 637048 | 2015 BG_{279} | — | July 29, 2003 | Campo Imperatore | CINEOS | · | 2.5 km | MPC · JPL |
| 637049 | 2015 BD_{289} | — | October 28, 2013 | Mount Lemmon | Mount Lemmon Survey | EOS | 1.6 km | MPC · JPL |
| 637050 | 2015 BP_{290} | — | January 19, 2015 | Haleakala | Pan-STARRS 1 | · | 2.9 km | MPC · JPL |
| 637051 | 2015 BP_{297} | — | October 12, 2007 | Kitt Peak | Spacewatch | · | 740 m | MPC · JPL |
| 637052 | 2015 BJ_{299} | — | February 8, 2008 | Kitt Peak | Spacewatch | · | 700 m | MPC · JPL |
| 637053 | 2015 BE_{300} | — | March 24, 2001 | Kitt Peak | Spacewatch | · | 1.0 km | MPC · JPL |
| 637054 | 2015 BJ_{301} | — | May 14, 2005 | Kitt Peak | Spacewatch | · | 600 m | MPC · JPL |
| 637055 | 2015 BW_{301} | — | May 1, 2012 | Kitt Peak | Spacewatch | · | 810 m | MPC · JPL |
| 637056 | 2015 BL_{304} | — | November 24, 2003 | Kitt Peak | Spacewatch | · | 2.5 km | MPC · JPL |
| 637057 | 2015 BW_{304} | — | December 8, 1996 | Kitt Peak | Spacewatch | · | 790 m | MPC · JPL |
| 637058 | 2015 BG_{305} | — | January 6, 2010 | Kitt Peak | Spacewatch | · | 1.8 km | MPC · JPL |
| 637059 | 2015 BV_{310} | — | October 14, 2010 | Mount Lemmon | Mount Lemmon Survey | · | 570 m | MPC · JPL |
| 637060 | 2015 BY_{313} | — | September 28, 2008 | Mount Lemmon | Mount Lemmon Survey | · | 1.8 km | MPC · JPL |
| 637061 | 2015 BT_{314} | — | March 5, 2002 | Kitt Peak | Spacewatch | · | 530 m | MPC · JPL |
| 637062 | 2015 BJ_{318} | — | November 19, 2008 | Kitt Peak | Spacewatch | · | 1.7 km | MPC · JPL |
| 637063 | 2015 BV_{330} | — | November 9, 2013 | Kitt Peak | Spacewatch | · | 2.0 km | MPC · JPL |
| 637064 | 2015 BP_{333} | — | November 9, 2013 | Mount Lemmon | Mount Lemmon Survey | · | 1.1 km | MPC · JPL |
| 637065 | 2015 BE_{335} | — | January 17, 2015 | Haleakala | Pan-STARRS 1 | · | 1.7 km | MPC · JPL |
| 637066 | 2015 BJ_{338} | — | May 19, 2005 | Mount Lemmon | Mount Lemmon Survey | · | 3.0 km | MPC · JPL |
| 637067 | 2015 BS_{347} | — | March 3, 2009 | Mount Lemmon | Mount Lemmon Survey | · | 730 m | MPC · JPL |
| 637068 | 2015 BS_{348} | — | January 18, 2015 | Haleakala | Pan-STARRS 1 | · | 650 m | MPC · JPL |
| 637069 | 2015 BB_{349} | — | May 1, 2006 | Kitt Peak | Spacewatch | EOS | 2.1 km | MPC · JPL |
| 637070 | 2015 BB_{350} | — | September 30, 2003 | Kitt Peak | Spacewatch | · | 1.8 km | MPC · JPL |
| 637071 | 2015 BA_{356} | — | February 4, 2005 | Kitt Peak | Spacewatch | · | 860 m | MPC · JPL |
| 637072 | 2015 BY_{360} | — | November 20, 2003 | Kitt Peak | Spacewatch | (2076) | 840 m | MPC · JPL |
| 637073 | 2015 BU_{362} | — | July 14, 2013 | Haleakala | Pan-STARRS 1 | · | 520 m | MPC · JPL |
| 637074 | 2015 BF_{364} | — | October 10, 2007 | Mount Lemmon | Mount Lemmon Survey | · | 580 m | MPC · JPL |
| 637075 | 2015 BY_{364} | — | October 8, 2007 | Mount Lemmon | Mount Lemmon Survey | · | 650 m | MPC · JPL |
| 637076 | 2015 BR_{365} | — | September 18, 2003 | Kitt Peak | Spacewatch | · | 680 m | MPC · JPL |
| 637077 | 2015 BS_{375} | — | December 26, 2014 | Haleakala | Pan-STARRS 1 | · | 570 m | MPC · JPL |
| 637078 | 2015 BP_{384} | — | January 7, 2005 | Kitt Peak | Spacewatch | · | 620 m | MPC · JPL |
| 637079 | 2015 BK_{386} | — | January 20, 2015 | Haleakala | Pan-STARRS 1 | · | 1.3 km | MPC · JPL |
| 637080 | 2015 BO_{387} | — | December 21, 2008 | Mount Lemmon | Mount Lemmon Survey | · | 3.3 km | MPC · JPL |
| 637081 | 2015 BX_{387} | — | August 17, 2012 | Haleakala | Pan-STARRS 1 | EOS | 1.3 km | MPC · JPL |
| 637082 | 2015 BX_{391} | — | December 22, 2008 | Kitt Peak | Spacewatch | · | 2.6 km | MPC · JPL |
| 637083 | 2015 BX_{401} | — | August 16, 2002 | Kitt Peak | Spacewatch | · | 710 m | MPC · JPL |
| 637084 | 2015 BV_{417} | — | July 13, 2013 | Haleakala | Pan-STARRS 1 | · | 720 m | MPC · JPL |
| 637085 | 2015 BD_{418} | — | October 27, 2008 | Kitt Peak | Spacewatch | KOR | 1.0 km | MPC · JPL |
| 637086 | 2015 BX_{418} | — | September 29, 2008 | Kitt Peak | Spacewatch | HOF | 2.4 km | MPC · JPL |
| 637087 | 2015 BH_{420} | — | January 20, 2015 | Haleakala | Pan-STARRS 1 | · | 2.6 km | MPC · JPL |
| 637088 | 2015 BR_{421} | — | January 30, 2006 | Kitt Peak | Spacewatch | HOF | 2.3 km | MPC · JPL |
| 637089 | 2015 BM_{424} | — | February 24, 2008 | Kitt Peak | Spacewatch | · | 740 m | MPC · JPL |
| 637090 | 2015 BH_{425} | — | September 12, 2002 | Palomar | NEAT | · | 1.3 km | MPC · JPL |
| 637091 | 2015 BG_{431} | — | November 28, 2013 | Haleakala | Pan-STARRS 1 | · | 1.7 km | MPC · JPL |
| 637092 | 2015 BV_{434} | — | December 3, 2007 | Kitt Peak | Spacewatch | · | 690 m | MPC · JPL |
| 637093 | 2015 BO_{439} | — | February 13, 2008 | Kitt Peak | Spacewatch | · | 760 m | MPC · JPL |
| 637094 | 2015 BM_{442} | — | August 29, 2005 | Palomar | NEAT | · | 1.6 km | MPC · JPL |
| 637095 | 2015 BH_{443} | — | August 13, 2004 | Cerro Tololo | Deep Ecliptic Survey | · | 1.5 km | MPC · JPL |
| 637096 | 2015 BJ_{447} | — | September 12, 2007 | Kitt Peak | Spacewatch | · | 1.6 km | MPC · JPL |
| 637097 | 2015 BS_{448} | — | April 8, 2006 | Kitt Peak | Spacewatch | · | 1.4 km | MPC · JPL |
| 637098 | 2015 BR_{450} | — | March 31, 2003 | Cerro Tololo | Deep Lens Survey | · | 1.4 km | MPC · JPL |
| 637099 | 2015 BA_{456} | — | September 1, 2010 | Mount Lemmon | Mount Lemmon Survey | · | 630 m | MPC · JPL |
| 637100 | 2015 BO_{468} | — | June 27, 2011 | Kitt Peak | Spacewatch | TIR | 3.0 km | MPC · JPL |

== 637101–637200 ==
back to top

| Designation | | | Discovery | | | Properties | | Ref |
| Permanent | Provisional | Named after | Date | Site | Discoverer(s) | Category | Diam. | Ref |
|---|---|---|---|---|---|---|---|---|
| 637101 | 2015 BG_{470} | — | August 22, 2006 | Palomar | NEAT | (2076) | 710 m | MPC · JPL |
| 637102 | 2015 BM_{474} | — | January 20, 2015 | Haleakala | Pan-STARRS 1 | KOR | 1.0 km | MPC · JPL |
| 637103 | 2015 BG_{480} | — | March 28, 2012 | Kitt Peak | Spacewatch | · | 660 m | MPC · JPL |
| 637104 | 2015 BL_{482} | — | May 26, 2006 | Mount Lemmon | Mount Lemmon Survey | · | 590 m | MPC · JPL |
| 637105 | 2015 BC_{483} | — | January 20, 2015 | Haleakala | Pan-STARRS 1 | · | 530 m | MPC · JPL |
| 637106 | 2015 BL_{485} | — | January 14, 2002 | Kitt Peak | Spacewatch | · | 640 m | MPC · JPL |
| 637107 | 2015 BE_{486} | — | February 2, 2005 | Kitt Peak | Spacewatch | · | 560 m | MPC · JPL |
| 637108 | 2015 BN_{490} | — | September 12, 2007 | Mount Lemmon | Mount Lemmon Survey | · | 540 m | MPC · JPL |
| 637109 | 2015 BN_{492} | — | January 20, 2015 | Haleakala | Pan-STARRS 1 | · | 2.4 km | MPC · JPL |
| 637110 | 2015 BX_{492} | — | March 20, 2001 | Kitt Peak | Spacewatch | · | 1.1 km | MPC · JPL |
| 637111 | 2015 BT_{493} | — | November 8, 2013 | Mount Lemmon | Mount Lemmon Survey | · | 1.9 km | MPC · JPL |
| 637112 | 2015 BR_{496} | — | January 20, 2015 | Haleakala | Pan-STARRS 1 | KOR | 1.0 km | MPC · JPL |
| 637113 | 2015 BK_{498} | — | December 2, 2010 | Mount Lemmon | Mount Lemmon Survey | · | 650 m | MPC · JPL |
| 637114 | 2015 BY_{500} | — | October 20, 2008 | Mount Lemmon | Mount Lemmon Survey | KOR | 1.0 km | MPC · JPL |
| 637115 | 2015 BB_{505} | — | September 6, 2008 | Mount Lemmon | Mount Lemmon Survey | · | 1.4 km | MPC · JPL |
| 637116 | 2015 BD_{506} | — | December 21, 2014 | Mount Lemmon | Mount Lemmon Survey | EOS | 2.3 km | MPC · JPL |
| 637117 | 2015 BG_{513} | — | September 11, 2007 | Mount Lemmon | Mount Lemmon Survey | L4 | 10 km | MPC · JPL |
| 637118 | 2015 BJ_{521} | — | September 3, 2008 | Kitt Peak | Spacewatch | L4 | 6.8 km | MPC · JPL |
| 637119 | 2015 BL_{534} | — | January 19, 2015 | Mount Lemmon | Mount Lemmon Survey | · | 1.7 km | MPC · JPL |
| 637120 | 2015 BR_{534} | — | February 14, 2004 | Palomar | NEAT | EOS | 2.3 km | MPC · JPL |
| 637121 | 2015 BJ_{535} | — | April 25, 2003 | Kitt Peak | Spacewatch | · | 1.3 km | MPC · JPL |
| 637122 | 2015 BY_{537} | — | January 20, 2015 | Haleakala | Pan-STARRS 1 | V | 550 m | MPC · JPL |
| 637123 | 2015 BY_{540} | — | September 13, 2007 | Mount Lemmon | Mount Lemmon Survey | · | 2.7 km | MPC · JPL |
| 637124 | 2015 BH_{542} | — | November 6, 2008 | Mount Lemmon | Mount Lemmon Survey | KOR | 1.3 km | MPC · JPL |
| 637125 | 2015 BJ_{542} | — | February 10, 2008 | Mount Lemmon | Mount Lemmon Survey | · | 990 m | MPC · JPL |
| 637126 | 2015 BK_{542} | — | February 14, 2008 | Mount Lemmon | Mount Lemmon Survey | · | 720 m | MPC · JPL |
| 637127 | 2015 BP_{543} | — | January 22, 2015 | Haleakala | Pan-STARRS 1 | · | 1.4 km | MPC · JPL |
| 637128 | 2015 BL_{545} | — | October 10, 2012 | Haleakala | Pan-STARRS 1 | · | 3.2 km | MPC · JPL |
| 637129 | 2015 BJ_{547} | — | October 20, 2003 | Kitt Peak | Spacewatch | · | 700 m | MPC · JPL |
| 637130 | 2015 BY_{550} | — | November 10, 2004 | Kitt Peak | Deep Ecliptic Survey | AGN | 1.3 km | MPC · JPL |
| 637131 | 2015 BL_{551} | — | September 10, 2007 | Mount Lemmon | Mount Lemmon Survey | · | 1.6 km | MPC · JPL |
| 637132 | 2015 BM_{555} | — | January 17, 2015 | Haleakala | Pan-STARRS 1 | L5 | 8.1 km | MPC · JPL |
| 637133 | 2015 BP_{555} | — | January 17, 2015 | Mount Lemmon | Mount Lemmon Survey | · | 2.4 km | MPC · JPL |
| 637134 | 2015 BP_{557} | — | October 15, 2004 | Mount Lemmon | Mount Lemmon Survey | · | 2.2 km | MPC · JPL |
| 637135 | 2015 BW_{558} | — | July 10, 2001 | Palomar | NEAT | · | 3.1 km | MPC · JPL |
| 637136 | 2015 BP_{563} | — | November 21, 2008 | Mount Lemmon | Mount Lemmon Survey | · | 1.6 km | MPC · JPL |
| 637137 | 2015 BG_{565} | — | January 17, 2015 | Haleakala | Pan-STARRS 1 | · | 2.5 km | MPC · JPL |
| 637138 | 2015 BV_{565} | — | September 15, 2012 | Catalina | CSS | · | 4.5 km | MPC · JPL |
| 637139 | 2015 BD_{590} | — | January 22, 2015 | Haleakala | Pan-STARRS 1 | · | 1.8 km | MPC · JPL |
| 637140 | 2015 BN_{593} | — | October 15, 2013 | Mount Lemmon | Mount Lemmon Survey | · | 1.6 km | MPC · JPL |
| 637141 | 2015 BB_{603} | — | January 29, 2015 | Haleakala | Pan-STARRS 1 | · | 530 m | MPC · JPL |
| 637142 | 2015 BJ_{603} | — | January 22, 2015 | Haleakala | Pan-STARRS 1 | · | 2.9 km | MPC · JPL |
| 637143 | 2015 BZ_{606} | — | January 22, 2015 | Haleakala | Pan-STARRS 1 | · | 920 m | MPC · JPL |
| 637144 | 2015 BR_{613} | — | January 21, 2015 | Haleakala | Pan-STARRS 1 | · | 2.3 km | MPC · JPL |
| 637145 | 2015 CD_{5} | — | October 9, 2007 | Mount Lemmon | Mount Lemmon Survey | · | 2.8 km | MPC · JPL |
| 637146 | 2015 CQ_{5} | — | January 25, 2004 | Haleakala | NEAT | · | 3.7 km | MPC · JPL |
| 637147 | 2015 CA_{7} | — | March 3, 2006 | Kitt Peak | Spacewatch | AGN | 1.2 km | MPC · JPL |
| 637148 | 2015 CU_{9} | — | July 24, 2003 | Palomar | NEAT | · | 2.3 km | MPC · JPL |
| 637149 | 2015 CV_{9} | — | August 14, 2013 | Haleakala | Pan-STARRS 1 | · | 590 m | MPC · JPL |
| 637150 | 2015 CC_{11} | — | August 28, 2006 | Kitt Peak | Spacewatch | · | 820 m | MPC · JPL |
| 637151 | 2015 CG_{17} | — | January 6, 2005 | Catalina | CSS | · | 720 m | MPC · JPL |
| 637152 | 2015 CJ_{18} | — | October 14, 2004 | Kitt Peak | Spacewatch | MRX | 1.1 km | MPC · JPL |
| 637153 | 2015 CF_{24} | — | February 2, 2006 | Mount Lemmon | Mount Lemmon Survey | · | 2.3 km | MPC · JPL |
| 637154 | 2015 CP_{29} | — | September 15, 2013 | Catalina | CSS | · | 660 m | MPC · JPL |
| 637155 | 2015 CG_{32} | — | February 11, 2015 | Kitt Peak | Spacewatch | EOS | 1.6 km | MPC · JPL |
| 637156 | 2015 CB_{33} | — | April 8, 2008 | Kitt Peak | Spacewatch | · | 950 m | MPC · JPL |
| 637157 | 2015 CY_{34} | — | October 15, 2009 | Catalina | CSS | · | 2.3 km | MPC · JPL |
| 637158 | 2015 CQ_{40} | — | February 18, 2004 | Kitt Peak | Spacewatch | · | 1.2 km | MPC · JPL |
| 637159 | 2015 CD_{41} | — | March 2, 2006 | Kitt Peak | Spacewatch | · | 1.7 km | MPC · JPL |
| 637160 | 2015 CY_{41} | — | October 24, 2009 | Kitt Peak | Spacewatch | · | 2.4 km | MPC · JPL |
| 637161 | 2015 CE_{42} | — | January 27, 2006 | Mount Lemmon | Mount Lemmon Survey | · | 1.8 km | MPC · JPL |
| 637162 | 2015 CD_{43} | — | December 29, 2003 | Kitt Peak | Spacewatch | · | 1.9 km | MPC · JPL |
| 637163 | 2015 CN_{44} | — | April 12, 2011 | Mount Lemmon | Mount Lemmon Survey | · | 1.6 km | MPC · JPL |
| 637164 | 2015 CY_{46} | — | January 29, 2015 | Haleakala | Pan-STARRS 1 | · | 1.9 km | MPC · JPL |
| 637165 | 2015 CL_{47} | — | January 4, 2011 | Mount Lemmon | Mount Lemmon Survey | · | 1.1 km | MPC · JPL |
| 637166 | 2015 CN_{48} | — | September 29, 2009 | Kitt Peak | Spacewatch | · | 990 m | MPC · JPL |
| 637167 | 2015 CO_{49} | — | September 30, 1995 | Kitt Peak | Spacewatch | · | 740 m | MPC · JPL |
| 637168 | 2015 CT_{52} | — | March 19, 2010 | Kitt Peak | Spacewatch | · | 1.9 km | MPC · JPL |
| 637169 | 2015 CH_{54} | — | February 27, 2008 | Mount Lemmon | Mount Lemmon Survey | · | 720 m | MPC · JPL |
| 637170 | 2015 CC_{55} | — | February 2, 2008 | Mount Lemmon | Mount Lemmon Survey | V | 660 m | MPC · JPL |
| 637171 | 2015 CD_{55} | — | March 10, 1999 | Kitt Peak | Spacewatch | EOS | 1.9 km | MPC · JPL |
| 637172 | 2015 CD_{57} | — | September 30, 2003 | Kitt Peak | Spacewatch | BRA | 1.7 km | MPC · JPL |
| 637173 | 2015 CX_{59} | — | April 6, 2005 | Kitt Peak | Spacewatch | EOS | 2.4 km | MPC · JPL |
| 637174 | 2015 CT_{61} | — | July 13, 2001 | Palomar | NEAT | · | 1.3 km | MPC · JPL |
| 637175 | 2015 CK_{64} | — | March 20, 2002 | Kitt Peak | Deep Ecliptic Survey | · | 800 m | MPC · JPL |
| 637176 | 2015 CP_{73} | — | February 11, 2015 | Mount Lemmon | Mount Lemmon Survey | · | 1.8 km | MPC · JPL |
| 637177 | 2015 CD_{77} | — | February 12, 2015 | Haleakala | Pan-STARRS 1 | · | 2.4 km | MPC · JPL |
| 637178 | 2015 DA_{3} | — | June 17, 2005 | Mount Lemmon | Mount Lemmon Survey | PHO | 1.2 km | MPC · JPL |
| 637179 | 2015 DT_{6} | — | October 26, 2009 | Mount Lemmon | Mount Lemmon Survey | · | 1.4 km | MPC · JPL |
| 637180 | 2015 DC_{7} | — | September 30, 2005 | Mauna Kea | A. Boattini | · | 1.8 km | MPC · JPL |
| 637181 | 2015 DR_{7} | — | August 1, 2005 | Mauna Kea | D. J. Tholen | · | 1.2 km | MPC · JPL |
| 637182 | 2015 DP_{10} | — | August 21, 2012 | Haleakala | Pan-STARRS 1 | URS | 3.1 km | MPC · JPL |
| 637183 | 2015 DT_{16} | — | February 16, 2015 | Haleakala | Pan-STARRS 1 | · | 1.7 km | MPC · JPL |
| 637184 | 2015 DU_{17} | — | March 31, 2012 | Mount Lemmon | Mount Lemmon Survey | · | 590 m | MPC · JPL |
| 637185 | 2015 DJ_{18} | — | January 24, 2015 | Mount Lemmon | Mount Lemmon Survey | · | 1.7 km | MPC · JPL |
| 637186 | 2015 DP_{18} | — | February 16, 2015 | Haleakala | Pan-STARRS 1 | · | 530 m | MPC · JPL |
| 637187 | 2015 DZ_{18} | — | November 2, 2007 | Mount Lemmon | Mount Lemmon Survey | · | 640 m | MPC · JPL |
| 637188 | 2015 DN_{23} | — | March 24, 2003 | Kitt Peak | Spacewatch | · | 1.3 km | MPC · JPL |
| 637189 | 2015 DN_{24} | — | October 4, 2003 | Kitt Peak | Spacewatch | (18466) | 2.6 km | MPC · JPL |
| 637190 | 2015 DG_{25} | — | February 8, 2008 | Kitt Peak | Spacewatch | · | 880 m | MPC · JPL |
| 637191 | 2015 DZ_{26} | — | April 21, 2009 | Kitt Peak | Spacewatch | · | 760 m | MPC · JPL |
| 637192 | 2015 DF_{27} | — | May 1, 2012 | Mount Lemmon | Mount Lemmon Survey | · | 630 m | MPC · JPL |
| 637193 | 2015 DN_{31} | — | April 8, 2006 | Kitt Peak | Spacewatch | · | 2.1 km | MPC · JPL |
| 637194 | 2015 DO_{33} | — | October 1, 2005 | Mount Lemmon | Mount Lemmon Survey | · | 1.1 km | MPC · JPL |
| 637195 | 2015 DJ_{40} | — | November 1, 2006 | Mount Lemmon | Mount Lemmon Survey | PHO | 690 m | MPC · JPL |
| 637196 | 2015 DB_{46} | — | November 19, 2007 | Mount Lemmon | Mount Lemmon Survey | · | 690 m | MPC · JPL |
| 637197 | 2015 DH_{47} | — | November 12, 2010 | Mount Lemmon | Mount Lemmon Survey | · | 640 m | MPC · JPL |
| 637198 | 2015 DX_{47} | — | September 16, 2006 | Kitt Peak | Spacewatch | · | 790 m | MPC · JPL |
| 637199 | 2015 DG_{50} | — | October 26, 2013 | Mount Lemmon | Mount Lemmon Survey | · | 690 m | MPC · JPL |
| 637200 | 2015 DO_{54} | — | September 14, 2007 | Kitt Peak | Spacewatch | · | 3.7 km | MPC · JPL |

== 637201–637300 ==
back to top

| Designation | | | Discovery | | | Properties | | Ref |
| Permanent | Provisional | Named after | Date | Site | Discoverer(s) | Category | Diam. | Ref |
|---|---|---|---|---|---|---|---|---|
| 637201 | 2015 DV_{58} | — | May 21, 2006 | Kitt Peak | Spacewatch | KOR | 1.1 km | MPC · JPL |
| 637202 | 2015 DX_{62} | — | January 22, 2015 | Haleakala | Pan-STARRS 1 | · | 1.9 km | MPC · JPL |
| 637203 | 2015 DA_{69} | — | October 3, 2006 | Mount Lemmon | Mount Lemmon Survey | · | 800 m | MPC · JPL |
| 637204 | 2015 DQ_{71} | — | December 13, 2006 | Mount Lemmon | Mount Lemmon Survey | NYS | 1.2 km | MPC · JPL |
| 637205 | 2015 DK_{75} | — | January 16, 2005 | Mauna Kea | P. A. Wiegert, D. D. Balam | · | 630 m | MPC · JPL |
| 637206 | 2015 DA_{77} | — | August 19, 2001 | Cerro Tololo | Deep Ecliptic Survey | · | 1.0 km | MPC · JPL |
| 637207 | 2015 DM_{89} | — | June 20, 2006 | Mount Lemmon | Mount Lemmon Survey | · | 3.3 km | MPC · JPL |
| 637208 | 2015 DR_{89} | — | September 19, 2006 | Kitt Peak | Spacewatch | · | 690 m | MPC · JPL |
| 637209 | 2015 DY_{92} | — | August 18, 2009 | Kitt Peak | Spacewatch | · | 910 m | MPC · JPL |
| 637210 | 2015 DT_{95} | — | July 29, 2005 | Siding Spring | SSS | · | 990 m | MPC · JPL |
| 637211 | 2015 DO_{97} | — | February 16, 2015 | Haleakala | Pan-STARRS 1 | · | 2.7 km | MPC · JPL |
| 637212 | 2015 DZ_{109} | — | January 27, 2015 | Haleakala | Pan-STARRS 1 | · | 2.2 km | MPC · JPL |
| 637213 | 2015 DE_{112} | — | October 17, 2001 | Palomar | NEAT | · | 1.2 km | MPC · JPL |
| 637214 | 2015 DX_{112} | — | October 7, 2008 | Mount Lemmon | Mount Lemmon Survey | GEF | 1.1 km | MPC · JPL |
| 637215 | 2015 DZ_{114} | — | January 17, 2015 | Haleakala | Pan-STARRS 1 | EOS | 1.4 km | MPC · JPL |
| 637216 | 2015 DZ_{115} | — | October 14, 2010 | Mount Lemmon | Mount Lemmon Survey | · | 1 km | MPC · JPL |
| 637217 | 2015 DV_{119} | — | October 17, 2003 | Kitt Peak | Spacewatch | BRA | 1.7 km | MPC · JPL |
| 637218 | 2015 DZ_{119} | — | May 31, 2012 | Mount Lemmon | Mount Lemmon Survey | · | 1.0 km | MPC · JPL |
| 637219 | 2015 DZ_{124} | — | December 1, 2011 | Haleakala | Pan-STARRS 1 | L4 | 8.5 km | MPC · JPL |
| 637220 | 2015 DF_{125} | — | April 4, 2010 | Catalina | CSS | · | 1.9 km | MPC · JPL |
| 637221 | 2015 DB_{127} | — | January 28, 2015 | Haleakala | Pan-STARRS 1 | · | 2.6 km | MPC · JPL |
| 637222 | 2015 DV_{128} | — | May 24, 2006 | Kitt Peak | Spacewatch | · | 2.1 km | MPC · JPL |
| 637223 | 2015 DJ_{138} | — | January 17, 2008 | Mount Lemmon | Mount Lemmon Survey | TIR | 3.7 km | MPC · JPL |
| 637224 | 2015 DF_{143} | — | September 2, 2010 | Mount Lemmon | Mount Lemmon Survey | · | 490 m | MPC · JPL |
| 637225 | 2015 DS_{143} | — | March 24, 2012 | Kitt Peak | Spacewatch | · | 780 m | MPC · JPL |
| 637226 | 2015 DJ_{146} | — | March 29, 2011 | Mount Lemmon | Mount Lemmon Survey | · | 1.5 km | MPC · JPL |
| 637227 | 2015 DM_{146} | — | January 24, 2015 | Haleakala | Pan-STARRS 1 | · | 1.2 km | MPC · JPL |
| 637228 | 2015 DY_{147} | — | May 22, 2011 | Mount Lemmon | Mount Lemmon Survey | EOS | 1.9 km | MPC · JPL |
| 637229 | 2015 DG_{149} | — | November 13, 2010 | Mount Lemmon | Mount Lemmon Survey | · | 650 m | MPC · JPL |
| 637230 | 2015 DU_{151} | — | November 1, 2010 | Mount Lemmon | Mount Lemmon Survey | · | 530 m | MPC · JPL |
| 637231 | 2015 DX_{151} | — | February 2, 2005 | Kitt Peak | Spacewatch | KOR | 1.4 km | MPC · JPL |
| 637232 | 2015 DK_{154} | — | April 5, 2011 | Mount Lemmon | Mount Lemmon Survey | · | 2.1 km | MPC · JPL |
| 637233 | 2015 DW_{158} | — | March 24, 2003 | Kitt Peak | Spacewatch | · | 1.3 km | MPC · JPL |
| 637234 | 2015 DG_{159} | — | October 11, 2012 | Mount Lemmon | Mount Lemmon Survey | · | 1.6 km | MPC · JPL |
| 637235 | 2015 DZ_{159} | — | January 4, 2011 | Mount Lemmon | Mount Lemmon Survey | · | 760 m | MPC · JPL |
| 637236 | 2015 DF_{160} | — | February 18, 2015 | Mount Lemmon | Mount Lemmon Survey | EOS | 1.6 km | MPC · JPL |
| 637237 | 2015 DX_{162} | — | August 23, 2003 | Cerro Tololo | Deep Ecliptic Survey | · | 2.0 km | MPC · JPL |
| 637238 | 2015 DF_{171} | — | January 21, 2015 | Haleakala | Pan-STARRS 1 | · | 2.2 km | MPC · JPL |
| 637239 | 2015 DU_{175} | — | February 19, 2015 | Haleakala | Pan-STARRS 1 | · | 3.3 km | MPC · JPL |
| 637240 | 2015 DO_{176} | — | March 8, 1995 | Kitt Peak | Spacewatch | · | 680 m | MPC · JPL |
| 637241 | 2015 DK_{181} | — | January 23, 2014 | Palomar | Palomar Transient Factory | · | 3.3 km | MPC · JPL |
| 637242 | 2015 DM_{185} | — | July 14, 2013 | Haleakala | Pan-STARRS 1 | · | 640 m | MPC · JPL |
| 637243 | 2015 DE_{195} | — | December 1, 2008 | Kitt Peak | Spacewatch | · | 2.2 km | MPC · JPL |
| 637244 | 2015 DL_{196} | — | January 6, 2010 | Mount Lemmon | Mount Lemmon Survey | · | 2.7 km | MPC · JPL |
| 637245 | 2015 DE_{201} | — | September 29, 2010 | Mount Lemmon | Mount Lemmon Survey | · | 760 m | MPC · JPL |
| 637246 | 2015 DO_{202} | — | August 20, 2006 | Palomar | NEAT | · | 2.9 km | MPC · JPL |
| 637247 | 2015 DX_{206} | — | August 28, 2005 | Siding Spring | SSS | · | 860 m | MPC · JPL |
| 637248 | 2015 DX_{207} | — | May 27, 2005 | Piszkéstető | K. Sárneczky | EOS | 1.7 km | MPC · JPL |
| 637249 | 2015 DO_{208} | — | August 31, 2005 | Palomar | NEAT | · | 1.5 km | MPC · JPL |
| 637250 | 2015 DR_{208} | — | January 17, 2007 | Kitt Peak | Spacewatch | · | 1.2 km | MPC · JPL |
| 637251 | 2015 DW_{209} | — | April 16, 2005 | Kitt Peak | Spacewatch | · | 2.4 km | MPC · JPL |
| 637252 | 2015 DB_{211} | — | December 19, 2007 | Mount Lemmon | Mount Lemmon Survey | · | 790 m | MPC · JPL |
| 637253 | 2015 DX_{212} | — | January 18, 1994 | Kitt Peak | Spacewatch | · | 560 m | MPC · JPL |
| 637254 | 2015 DO_{213} | — | August 31, 2011 | Haleakala | Pan-STARRS 1 | EOS | 2.1 km | MPC · JPL |
| 637255 | 2015 DV_{214} | — | February 20, 2002 | Kitt Peak | Spacewatch | · | 550 m | MPC · JPL |
| 637256 | 2015 DM_{217} | — | February 11, 2015 | Mount Lemmon | Mount Lemmon Survey | · | 1.3 km | MPC · JPL |
| 637257 | 2015 DM_{218} | — | October 23, 2006 | Palomar | NEAT | V | 800 m | MPC · JPL |
| 637258 | 2015 DP_{218} | — | April 4, 2008 | Catalina | CSS | · | 730 m | MPC · JPL |
| 637259 | 2015 DE_{222} | — | October 20, 2006 | Kitt Peak | Spacewatch | · | 840 m | MPC · JPL |
| 637260 | 2015 DH_{223} | — | January 30, 2008 | Mount Lemmon | Mount Lemmon Survey | · | 780 m | MPC · JPL |
| 637261 | 2015 DT_{225} | — | March 31, 2003 | Kitt Peak | Spacewatch | L4 | 8.1 km | MPC · JPL |
| 637262 | 2015 DY_{227} | — | February 27, 2008 | Mount Lemmon | Mount Lemmon Survey | · | 740 m | MPC · JPL |
| 637263 | 2015 DV_{233} | — | February 27, 2015 | Haleakala | Pan-STARRS 1 | V | 610 m | MPC · JPL |
| 637264 | 2015 DE_{242} | — | March 12, 2000 | Kitt Peak | Spacewatch | · | 1.7 km | MPC · JPL |
| 637265 | 2015 DZ_{242} | — | February 19, 2015 | Haleakala | Pan-STARRS 1 | · | 1.8 km | MPC · JPL |
| 637266 | 2015 DA_{245} | — | May 9, 2005 | Kitt Peak | Spacewatch | · | 710 m | MPC · JPL |
| 637267 | 2015 DY_{246} | — | February 17, 2004 | Kitt Peak | Spacewatch | EOS | 2.6 km | MPC · JPL |
| 637268 | 2015 DY_{251} | — | April 4, 2016 | Haleakala | Pan-STARRS 1 | LIX | 3.1 km | MPC · JPL |
| 637269 | 2015 DW_{272} | — | February 23, 2015 | Haleakala | Pan-STARRS 1 | · | 2.5 km | MPC · JPL |
| 637270 | 2015 DF_{286} | — | February 18, 2015 | Mount Lemmon | Mount Lemmon Survey | EOS | 1.5 km | MPC · JPL |
| 637271 | 2015 DA_{288} | — | February 17, 2015 | Haleakala | Pan-STARRS 1 | · | 2.2 km | MPC · JPL |
| 637272 | 2015 DJ_{305} | — | February 16, 2015 | Haleakala | Pan-STARRS 1 | · | 2.8 km | MPC · JPL |
| 637273 | 2015 DX_{308} | — | October 5, 2012 | Haleakala | Pan-STARRS 1 | · | 2.3 km | MPC · JPL |
| 637274 | 2015 DT_{317} | — | February 24, 2015 | Haleakala | Pan-STARRS 1 | EOS | 1.4 km | MPC · JPL |
| 637275 | 2015 ES_{8} | — | January 26, 2011 | Mount Lemmon | Mount Lemmon Survey | NYS | 890 m | MPC · JPL |
| 637276 | 2015 EF_{9} | — | May 11, 2007 | Mount Lemmon | Mount Lemmon Survey | · | 1.3 km | MPC · JPL |
| 637277 | 2015 EY_{9} | — | March 14, 2005 | Mount Lemmon | Mount Lemmon Survey | · | 830 m | MPC · JPL |
| 637278 | 2015 EL_{13} | — | November 8, 2010 | Mount Lemmon | Mount Lemmon Survey | · | 710 m | MPC · JPL |
| 637279 | 2015 EA_{16} | — | September 16, 2003 | Kitt Peak | Spacewatch | · | 720 m | MPC · JPL |
| 637280 | 2015 EN_{16} | — | August 4, 2005 | Palomar | NEAT | · | 1.4 km | MPC · JPL |
| 637281 | 2015 EK_{18} | — | September 17, 2003 | Kitt Peak | Spacewatch | · | 730 m | MPC · JPL |
| 637282 | 2015 ES_{20} | — | February 9, 2005 | Kitt Peak | Spacewatch | · | 740 m | MPC · JPL |
| 637283 | 2015 EE_{21} | — | February 25, 2006 | Kitt Peak | Spacewatch | · | 2.2 km | MPC · JPL |
| 637284 | 2015 EG_{23} | — | November 3, 2007 | Kitt Peak | Spacewatch | · | 580 m | MPC · JPL |
| 637285 | 2015 EK_{23} | — | September 30, 2010 | Mount Lemmon | Mount Lemmon Survey | · | 650 m | MPC · JPL |
| 637286 | 2015 EM_{24} | — | November 7, 2002 | Kitt Peak | Deep Ecliptic Survey | · | 1.6 km | MPC · JPL |
| 637287 | 2015 EJ_{29} | — | February 10, 2015 | Mount Lemmon | Mount Lemmon Survey | · | 500 m | MPC · JPL |
| 637288 | 2015 EE_{33} | — | August 31, 2005 | Palomar | NEAT | · | 1.4 km | MPC · JPL |
| 637289 | 2015 EM_{35} | — | January 21, 2015 | Haleakala | Pan-STARRS 1 | · | 2.5 km | MPC · JPL |
| 637290 | 2015 ES_{35} | — | October 21, 2003 | Kitt Peak | Spacewatch | KOR | 1.6 km | MPC · JPL |
| 637291 | 2015 EE_{39} | — | January 29, 2015 | Haleakala | Pan-STARRS 1 | · | 1.9 km | MPC · JPL |
| 637292 | 2015 EY_{39} | — | December 31, 2007 | Mount Lemmon | Mount Lemmon Survey | · | 550 m | MPC · JPL |
| 637293 | 2015 EH_{43} | — | November 6, 2007 | Kitt Peak | Spacewatch | · | 580 m | MPC · JPL |
| 637294 | 2015 EN_{43} | — | March 13, 2005 | Kitt Peak | Spacewatch | · | 640 m | MPC · JPL |
| 637295 | 2015 EC_{44} | — | February 15, 2015 | Haleakala | Pan-STARRS 1 | · | 2.5 km | MPC · JPL |
| 637296 | 2015 EO_{44} | — | April 1, 2012 | Kitt Peak | Spacewatch | · | 580 m | MPC · JPL |
| 637297 | 2015 EM_{45} | — | February 15, 2015 | Haleakala | Pan-STARRS 1 | · | 1.8 km | MPC · JPL |
| 637298 | 2015 EK_{46} | — | March 8, 2005 | Mount Lemmon | Mount Lemmon Survey | · | 510 m | MPC · JPL |
| 637299 | 2015 EC_{47} | — | January 21, 2015 | Haleakala | Pan-STARRS 1 | KOR | 1.1 km | MPC · JPL |
| 637300 | 2015 EK_{47} | — | October 4, 2006 | Mount Lemmon | Mount Lemmon Survey | · | 760 m | MPC · JPL |

== 637301–637400 ==
back to top

| Designation | | | Discovery | | | Properties | | Ref |
| Permanent | Provisional | Named after | Date | Site | Discoverer(s) | Category | Diam. | Ref |
|---|---|---|---|---|---|---|---|---|
| 637301 | 2015 EK_{49} | — | November 5, 2010 | Mount Lemmon | Mount Lemmon Survey | · | 630 m | MPC · JPL |
| 637302 | 2015 EJ_{56} | — | March 27, 2012 | Kitt Peak | Spacewatch | · | 610 m | MPC · JPL |
| 637303 | 2015 EQ_{61} | — | January 11, 2010 | Kitt Peak | Spacewatch | · | 1.7 km | MPC · JPL |
| 637304 | 2015 EB_{63} | — | February 2, 2008 | Mount Lemmon | Mount Lemmon Survey | · | 960 m | MPC · JPL |
| 637305 | 2015 EL_{63} | — | June 21, 2005 | Palomar | NEAT | · | 1.1 km | MPC · JPL |
| 637306 | 2015 EO_{63} | — | February 8, 2002 | Palomar | NEAT | · | 2.1 km | MPC · JPL |
| 637307 | 2015 ET_{63} | — | September 29, 2003 | Kitt Peak | Spacewatch | · | 750 m | MPC · JPL |
| 637308 | 2015 ER_{64} | — | April 22, 2004 | Kitt Peak | Spacewatch | L4 | 10 km | MPC · JPL |
| 637309 | 2015 EQ_{65} | — | February 26, 2012 | Mount Lemmon | Mount Lemmon Survey | · | 580 m | MPC · JPL |
| 637310 | 2015 EC_{67} | — | December 21, 2007 | Mount Lemmon | Mount Lemmon Survey | · | 720 m | MPC · JPL |
| 637311 | 2015 EN_{67} | — | November 21, 2007 | Mount Lemmon | Mount Lemmon Survey | · | 580 m | MPC · JPL |
| 637312 | 2015 ES_{70} | — | September 20, 2003 | Palomar | NEAT | · | 2.1 km | MPC · JPL |
| 637313 | 2015 EH_{78} | — | January 28, 2015 | Haleakala | Pan-STARRS 1 | · | 2.4 km | MPC · JPL |
| 637314 | 2015 EO_{78} | — | March 11, 2015 | Mount Lemmon | Mount Lemmon Survey | · | 2.3 km | MPC · JPL |
| 637315 | 2015 FQ_{17} | — | February 14, 2004 | Haleakala | NEAT | · | 2.7 km | MPC · JPL |
| 637316 | 2015 FP_{40} | — | September 10, 2007 | Mount Lemmon | Mount Lemmon Survey | L4 | 8.0 km | MPC · JPL |
| 637317 | 2015 FT_{45} | — | March 15, 2001 | Kitt Peak | Spacewatch | · | 2.0 km | MPC · JPL |
| 637318 | 2015 FY_{46} | — | March 18, 2005 | Catalina | CSS | PHO | 770 m | MPC · JPL |
| 637319 | 2015 FS_{51} | — | January 16, 2015 | Haleakala | Pan-STARRS 1 | · | 2.5 km | MPC · JPL |
| 637320 | 2015 FN_{53} | — | September 15, 2002 | Palomar | NEAT | EOS | 1.6 km | MPC · JPL |
| 637321 | 2015 FH_{67} | — | October 19, 2012 | Mount Lemmon | Mount Lemmon Survey | · | 3.4 km | MPC · JPL |
| 637322 | 2015 FK_{71} | — | July 31, 2000 | Cerro Tololo | Deep Ecliptic Survey | HYG | 2.3 km | MPC · JPL |
| 637323 | 2015 FZ_{72} | — | April 30, 2004 | Kitt Peak | Spacewatch | · | 1.2 km | MPC · JPL |
| 637324 | 2015 FQ_{76} | — | March 21, 2002 | Palomar | NEAT | · | 2.0 km | MPC · JPL |
| 637325 | 2015 FG_{77} | — | August 20, 2003 | Haleakala | NEAT | · | 1.7 km | MPC · JPL |
| 637326 | 2015 FE_{78} | — | March 19, 2004 | Kitt Peak | Spacewatch | NYS | 850 m | MPC · JPL |
| 637327 | 2015 FR_{84} | — | November 30, 2003 | Kitt Peak | Spacewatch | · | 860 m | MPC · JPL |
| 637328 | 2015 FO_{94} | — | December 8, 2010 | Mount Lemmon | Mount Lemmon Survey | · | 840 m | MPC · JPL |
| 637329 | 2015 FJ_{101} | — | October 4, 1996 | Kitt Peak | Spacewatch | · | 2.4 km | MPC · JPL |
| 637330 | 2015 FS_{109} | — | August 29, 2005 | Kitt Peak | Spacewatch | · | 1.1 km | MPC · JPL |
| 637331 | 2015 FE_{111} | — | September 19, 2001 | Socorro | LINEAR | · | 2.3 km | MPC · JPL |
| 637332 | 2015 FO_{116} | — | February 27, 2015 | Haleakala | Pan-STARRS 1 | · | 1.6 km | MPC · JPL |
| 637333 | 2015 FX_{119} | — | March 4, 2008 | Mount Lemmon | Mount Lemmon Survey | · | 800 m | MPC · JPL |
| 637334 | 2015 FU_{122} | — | January 3, 2011 | Mount Lemmon | Mount Lemmon Survey | · | 710 m | MPC · JPL |
| 637335 | 2015 FW_{123} | — | April 13, 2004 | Kitt Peak | Spacewatch | NYS | 1.0 km | MPC · JPL |
| 637336 | 2015 FL_{129} | — | October 16, 2012 | Mount Lemmon | Mount Lemmon Survey | · | 3.1 km | MPC · JPL |
| 637337 | 2015 FC_{134} | — | September 25, 2009 | Mount Lemmon | Mount Lemmon Survey | · | 1.3 km | MPC · JPL |
| 637338 | 2015 FS_{134} | — | January 14, 2011 | Mount Lemmon | Mount Lemmon Survey | · | 630 m | MPC · JPL |
| 637339 | 2015 FV_{138} | — | October 12, 2013 | Mount Lemmon | Mount Lemmon Survey | · | 660 m | MPC · JPL |
| 637340 | 2015 FC_{140} | — | March 16, 2015 | Kitt Peak | Spacewatch | L4 | 7.5 km | MPC · JPL |
| 637341 | 2015 FJ_{140} | — | March 12, 2000 | Kitt Peak | Spacewatch | KOR | 1.9 km | MPC · JPL |
| 637342 | 2015 FP_{140} | — | October 28, 2005 | Kitt Peak | Spacewatch | · | 1.0 km | MPC · JPL |
| 637343 | 2015 FS_{140} | — | October 2, 2005 | Mount Lemmon | Mount Lemmon Survey | · | 1.2 km | MPC · JPL |
| 637344 | 2015 FF_{141} | — | October 17, 2010 | Mount Lemmon | Mount Lemmon Survey | L4 | 8.5 km | MPC · JPL |
| 637345 | 2015 FC_{142} | — | October 5, 2000 | Terskol | Terskol | (5) | 1.3 km | MPC · JPL |
| 637346 | 2015 FG_{143} | — | January 13, 2008 | Kitt Peak | Spacewatch | · | 580 m | MPC · JPL |
| 637347 | 2015 FH_{143} | — | April 4, 2005 | Mount Lemmon | Mount Lemmon Survey | KOR | 1.8 km | MPC · JPL |
| 637348 | 2015 FA_{145} | — | December 21, 2008 | Kitt Peak | Spacewatch | · | 2.2 km | MPC · JPL |
| 637349 | 2015 FK_{149} | — | December 11, 2013 | Haleakala | Pan-STARRS 1 | · | 1.5 km | MPC · JPL |
| 637350 | 2015 FM_{151} | — | November 27, 2013 | Haleakala | Pan-STARRS 1 | · | 1.6 km | MPC · JPL |
| 637351 | 2015 FQ_{161} | — | February 11, 2008 | Mount Lemmon | Mount Lemmon Survey | · | 790 m | MPC · JPL |
| 637352 | 2015 FS_{164} | — | February 25, 2011 | Kitt Peak | Spacewatch | MAS | 790 m | MPC · JPL |
| 637353 | 2015 FN_{165} | — | September 2, 2008 | Moletai | K. Černis | EUN | 1.3 km | MPC · JPL |
| 637354 | 2015 FZ_{167} | — | January 19, 2005 | Kitt Peak | Spacewatch | · | 570 m | MPC · JPL |
| 637355 | 2015 FN_{173} | — | February 23, 2015 | Haleakala | Pan-STARRS 1 | · | 570 m | MPC · JPL |
| 637356 | 2015 FO_{174} | — | March 21, 2015 | Haleakala | Pan-STARRS 1 | · | 2.4 km | MPC · JPL |
| 637357 | 2015 FV_{175} | — | November 10, 2010 | Mount Lemmon | Mount Lemmon Survey | · | 500 m | MPC · JPL |
| 637358 | 2015 FR_{178} | — | March 3, 2005 | Kitt Peak | Spacewatch | · | 2.1 km | MPC · JPL |
| 637359 | 2015 FZ_{178} | — | March 22, 2015 | Mount Lemmon | Mount Lemmon Survey | · | 1.5 km | MPC · JPL |
| 637360 | 2015 FF_{179} | — | March 22, 2015 | Mount Lemmon | Mount Lemmon Survey | · | 2.2 km | MPC · JPL |
| 637361 | 2015 FG_{185} | — | November 4, 2007 | Kitt Peak | Spacewatch | · | 1.8 km | MPC · JPL |
| 637362 | 2015 FW_{190} | — | February 23, 2015 | Haleakala | Pan-STARRS 1 | · | 1.6 km | MPC · JPL |
| 637363 | 2015 FF_{193} | — | October 2, 2006 | Mount Lemmon | Mount Lemmon Survey | · | 740 m | MPC · JPL |
| 637364 | 2015 FA_{194} | — | January 30, 2012 | Haleakala | Pan-STARRS 1 | · | 730 m | MPC · JPL |
| 637365 | 2015 FD_{194} | — | April 11, 2005 | Anderson Mesa | LONEOS | · | 710 m | MPC · JPL |
| 637366 | 2015 FG_{194} | — | February 13, 2008 | Kitt Peak | Spacewatch | · | 890 m | MPC · JPL |
| 637367 | 2015 FB_{195} | — | September 20, 2007 | Dauban | Kugel, C. R. F. | · | 2.3 km | MPC · JPL |
| 637368 | 2015 FQ_{196} | — | January 25, 2015 | Haleakala | Pan-STARRS 1 | · | 560 m | MPC · JPL |
| 637369 | 2015 FS_{197} | — | December 4, 2007 | Mount Lemmon | Mount Lemmon Survey | · | 650 m | MPC · JPL |
| 637370 | 2015 FC_{204} | — | August 13, 2012 | Kitt Peak | Spacewatch | · | 2.4 km | MPC · JPL |
| 637371 | 2015 FJ_{204} | — | October 9, 2007 | Kitt Peak | Spacewatch | EOS | 1.4 km | MPC · JPL |
| 637372 | 2015 FQ_{204} | — | October 19, 1995 | Kitt Peak | Spacewatch | · | 1.0 km | MPC · JPL |
| 637373 | 2015 FW_{206} | — | February 16, 2015 | Haleakala | Pan-STARRS 1 | · | 1.0 km | MPC · JPL |
| 637374 | 2015 FK_{215} | — | March 23, 2015 | Mount Lemmon | Mount Lemmon Survey | · | 700 m | MPC · JPL |
| 637375 | 2015 FU_{219} | — | December 22, 2005 | Kitt Peak | Spacewatch | · | 1.2 km | MPC · JPL |
| 637376 | 2015 FK_{223} | — | March 23, 2015 | Haleakala | Pan-STARRS 1 | · | 920 m | MPC · JPL |
| 637377 | 2015 FK_{231} | — | November 1, 2008 | Mount Lemmon | Mount Lemmon Survey | · | 1.9 km | MPC · JPL |
| 637378 | 2015 FX_{232} | — | April 29, 2008 | Mount Lemmon | Mount Lemmon Survey | NYS | 900 m | MPC · JPL |
| 637379 | 2015 FK_{236} | — | November 11, 2006 | Mount Lemmon | Mount Lemmon Survey | · | 590 m | MPC · JPL |
| 637380 | 2015 FL_{237} | — | April 5, 2008 | Kitt Peak | Spacewatch | · | 880 m | MPC · JPL |
| 637381 | 2015 FY_{238} | — | January 17, 2008 | Mount Lemmon | Mount Lemmon Survey | · | 580 m | MPC · JPL |
| 637382 | 2015 FF_{241} | — | April 3, 2008 | Kitt Peak | Spacewatch | V | 600 m | MPC · JPL |
| 637383 | 2015 FB_{244} | — | March 11, 2008 | Mount Lemmon | Mount Lemmon Survey | · | 970 m | MPC · JPL |
| 637384 | 2015 FE_{252} | — | December 11, 2010 | Mount Lemmon | Mount Lemmon Survey | · | 730 m | MPC · JPL |
| 637385 | 2015 FQ_{253} | — | May 15, 2012 | Haleakala | Pan-STARRS 1 | · | 670 m | MPC · JPL |
| 637386 | 2015 FL_{254} | — | March 23, 2006 | Kitt Peak | Spacewatch | · | 1.5 km | MPC · JPL |
| 637387 | 2015 FW_{257} | — | September 29, 2008 | Catalina | CSS | · | 1.5 km | MPC · JPL |
| 637388 | 2015 FX_{257} | — | December 31, 2013 | Kitt Peak | Spacewatch | · | 2.7 km | MPC · JPL |
| 637389 | 2015 FV_{265} | — | January 30, 2008 | Kitt Peak | Spacewatch | V | 470 m | MPC · JPL |
| 637390 | 2015 FN_{272} | — | May 12, 2012 | Mount Lemmon | Mount Lemmon Survey | · | 650 m | MPC · JPL |
| 637391 | 2015 FJ_{278} | — | October 30, 2013 | Haleakala | Pan-STARRS 1 | · | 740 m | MPC · JPL |
| 637392 | 2015 FQ_{278} | — | December 30, 2007 | Mount Lemmon | Mount Lemmon Survey | · | 710 m | MPC · JPL |
| 637393 | 2015 FS_{278} | — | August 18, 2009 | Kitt Peak | Spacewatch | · | 630 m | MPC · JPL |
| 637394 | 2015 FQ_{283} | — | November 8, 2008 | Mount Lemmon | Mount Lemmon Survey | · | 2.0 km | MPC · JPL |
| 637395 | 2015 FU_{285} | — | March 25, 2015 | Haleakala | Pan-STARRS 1 | · | 840 m | MPC · JPL |
| 637396 | 2015 FR_{287} | — | June 16, 2012 | Haleakala | Pan-STARRS 1 | · | 720 m | MPC · JPL |
| 637397 | 2015 FV_{287} | — | January 17, 2008 | Mount Lemmon | Mount Lemmon Survey | · | 610 m | MPC · JPL |
| 637398 | 2015 FC_{288} | — | July 18, 2006 | Siding Spring | SSS | · | 770 m | MPC · JPL |
| 637399 | 2015 FU_{288} | — | December 5, 2005 | Mount Lemmon | Mount Lemmon Survey | · | 1.6 km | MPC · JPL |
| 637400 | 2015 FH_{295} | — | November 17, 2006 | Mount Lemmon | Mount Lemmon Survey | · | 1 km | MPC · JPL |

== 637401–637500 ==
back to top

| Designation | | | Discovery | | | Properties | | Ref |
| Permanent | Provisional | Named after | Date | Site | Discoverer(s) | Category | Diam. | Ref |
|---|---|---|---|---|---|---|---|---|
| 637401 | 2015 FQ_{295} | — | March 31, 2008 | Kitt Peak | Spacewatch | · | 760 m | MPC · JPL |
| 637402 | 2015 FP_{296} | — | November 11, 2001 | Apache Point | SDSS | · | 3.4 km | MPC · JPL |
| 637403 | 2015 FR_{300} | — | November 12, 2012 | Haleakala | Pan-STARRS 1 | · | 3.1 km | MPC · JPL |
| 637404 | 2015 FP_{303} | — | February 9, 2005 | Kitt Peak | Spacewatch | · | 2.8 km | MPC · JPL |
| 637405 | 2015 FV_{307} | — | October 16, 2009 | Mount Lemmon | Mount Lemmon Survey | · | 590 m | MPC · JPL |
| 637406 | 2015 FF_{310} | — | March 31, 2008 | Kitt Peak | Spacewatch | · | 760 m | MPC · JPL |
| 637407 | 2015 FU_{311} | — | March 30, 2011 | Bergisch Gladbach | W. Bickel | · | 1.1 km | MPC · JPL |
| 637408 | 2015 FA_{313} | — | March 25, 2015 | Haleakala | Pan-STARRS 1 | · | 2.3 km | MPC · JPL |
| 637409 | 2015 FO_{315} | — | September 28, 2009 | Mount Lemmon | Mount Lemmon Survey | V | 590 m | MPC · JPL |
| 637410 | 2015 FQ_{322} | — | December 29, 2005 | Palomar | NEAT | EUN | 1.6 km | MPC · JPL |
| 637411 | 2015 FS_{326} | — | September 16, 2009 | Catalina | CSS | V | 730 m | MPC · JPL |
| 637412 | 2015 FF_{327} | — | August 17, 2001 | Palomar | NEAT | EOS | 2.0 km | MPC · JPL |
| 637413 | 2015 FZ_{328} | — | October 8, 2012 | Haleakala | Pan-STARRS 1 | EOS | 1.8 km | MPC · JPL |
| 637414 | 2015 FF_{331} | — | February 28, 2008 | Mount Lemmon | Mount Lemmon Survey | · | 650 m | MPC · JPL |
| 637415 | 2015 FG_{333} | — | December 22, 2008 | Mount Lemmon | Mount Lemmon Survey | · | 2.2 km | MPC · JPL |
| 637416 | 2015 FN_{333} | — | February 13, 2008 | Kitt Peak | Spacewatch | · | 690 m | MPC · JPL |
| 637417 | 2015 FA_{334} | — | November 6, 1996 | Kitt Peak | Spacewatch | · | 680 m | MPC · JPL |
| 637418 | 2015 FM_{336} | — | October 25, 2001 | Apache Point | SDSS Collaboration | · | 2.4 km | MPC · JPL |
| 637419 | 2015 FE_{337} | — | December 25, 2013 | Mount Lemmon | Mount Lemmon Survey | · | 1.1 km | MPC · JPL |
| 637420 | 2015 FK_{337} | — | August 14, 2001 | Haleakala | NEAT | V | 770 m | MPC · JPL |
| 637421 | 2015 FP_{337} | — | February 21, 2003 | Palomar | NEAT | · | 3.3 km | MPC · JPL |
| 637422 | 2015 FC_{338} | — | March 13, 2011 | Kitt Peak | Spacewatch | · | 1.1 km | MPC · JPL |
| 637423 | 2015 FR_{340} | — | July 1, 2011 | Kitt Peak | Spacewatch | · | 2.4 km | MPC · JPL |
| 637424 | 2015 FV_{342} | — | October 14, 2001 | Apache Point | SDSS Collaboration | · | 2.8 km | MPC · JPL |
| 637425 | 2015 FX_{342} | — | November 5, 2007 | Kitt Peak | Spacewatch | EOS | 2.3 km | MPC · JPL |
| 637426 | 2015 FM_{343} | — | November 29, 2005 | Catalina | CSS | · | 1.6 km | MPC · JPL |
| 637427 | 2015 FO_{346} | — | February 8, 2015 | Mount Lemmon | Mount Lemmon Survey | · | 690 m | MPC · JPL |
| 637428 | 2015 FP_{346} | — | January 12, 2008 | Kitt Peak | Spacewatch | · | 720 m | MPC · JPL |
| 637429 | 2015 FX_{352} | — | November 21, 2009 | Kitt Peak | Spacewatch | · | 940 m | MPC · JPL |
| 637430 | 2015 FM_{354} | — | November 13, 2010 | Mount Lemmon | Mount Lemmon Survey | L4 | 6.9 km | MPC · JPL |
| 637431 | 2015 FL_{355} | — | November 16, 2002 | Palomar | NEAT | · | 1.1 km | MPC · JPL |
| 637432 | 2015 FJ_{356} | — | September 5, 2008 | Kitt Peak | Spacewatch | L4 | 8.1 km | MPC · JPL |
| 637433 | 2015 FZ_{356} | — | September 30, 2003 | Kitt Peak | Spacewatch | · | 1.5 km | MPC · JPL |
| 637434 | 2015 FB_{357} | — | August 31, 2005 | Kitt Peak | Spacewatch | · | 800 m | MPC · JPL |
| 637435 | 2015 FY_{358} | — | March 14, 2007 | Mount Lemmon | Mount Lemmon Survey | · | 1.7 km | MPC · JPL |
| 637436 | 2015 FZ_{358} | — | October 19, 2006 | Kitt Peak | Deep Ecliptic Survey | THM | 2.2 km | MPC · JPL |
| 637437 | 2015 FA_{360} | — | December 25, 2013 | Mount Lemmon | Mount Lemmon Survey | AGN | 1.1 km | MPC · JPL |
| 637438 | 2015 FL_{360} | — | March 16, 2004 | Kitt Peak | Spacewatch | · | 2.0 km | MPC · JPL |
| 637439 | 2015 FN_{361} | — | February 2, 2001 | Kitt Peak | Spacewatch | L4 | 6.6 km | MPC · JPL |
| 637440 | 2015 FQ_{361} | — | March 15, 2008 | Mount Lemmon | Mount Lemmon Survey | · | 570 m | MPC · JPL |
| 637441 | 2015 FM_{365} | — | October 9, 2013 | Mount Lemmon | Mount Lemmon Survey | · | 1.5 km | MPC · JPL |
| 637442 | 2015 FZ_{371} | — | September 20, 2007 | Catalina | CSS | · | 2.5 km | MPC · JPL |
| 637443 | 2015 FY_{372} | — | September 26, 2000 | Apache Point | SDSS | · | 3.0 km | MPC · JPL |
| 637444 | 2015 FS_{373} | — | January 28, 2014 | Charleston | R. Holmes | · | 2.9 km | MPC · JPL |
| 637445 | 2015 FZ_{373} | — | March 26, 2004 | Kitt Peak | Deep Lens Survey | EOS | 1.9 km | MPC · JPL |
| 637446 | 2015 FG_{374} | — | September 29, 2005 | Mount Lemmon | Mount Lemmon Survey | V | 770 m | MPC · JPL |
| 637447 | 2015 FV_{374} | — | January 15, 2008 | Kitt Peak | Spacewatch | · | 3.5 km | MPC · JPL |
| 637448 | 2015 FL_{382} | — | August 30, 2009 | Bergisch Gladbach | W. Bickel | V | 570 m | MPC · JPL |
| 637449 | 2015 FW_{387} | — | November 7, 2012 | Haleakala | Pan-STARRS 1 | URS | 2.2 km | MPC · JPL |
| 637450 | 2015 FG_{389} | — | January 22, 2015 | Haleakala | Pan-STARRS 1 | · | 2.4 km | MPC · JPL |
| 637451 | 2015 FD_{397} | — | August 28, 2006 | Kitt Peak | Spacewatch | · | 2.2 km | MPC · JPL |
| 637452 | 2015 FT_{401} | — | November 2, 2007 | Mount Lemmon | Mount Lemmon Survey | · | 2.5 km | MPC · JPL |
| 637453 | 2015 FR_{402} | — | January 13, 2011 | Mount Lemmon | Mount Lemmon Survey | · | 610 m | MPC · JPL |
| 637454 | 2015 FA_{403} | — | October 15, 2012 | Haleakala | Pan-STARRS 1 | · | 1.3 km | MPC · JPL |
| 637455 | 2015 FW_{404} | — | February 25, 2011 | Mount Lemmon | Mount Lemmon Survey | V | 540 m | MPC · JPL |
| 637456 | 2015 FY_{404} | — | May 1, 2001 | Kitt Peak | Spacewatch | · | 980 m | MPC · JPL |
| 637457 | 2015 FT_{406} | — | April 1, 2003 | Apache Point | SDSS Collaboration | (895) | 3.5 km | MPC · JPL |
| 637458 | 2015 FJ_{408} | — | November 28, 2013 | Mount Lemmon | Mount Lemmon Survey | · | 1.1 km | MPC · JPL |
| 637459 | 2015 FQ_{408} | — | August 17, 2012 | ESA OGS | ESA OGS | V | 510 m | MPC · JPL |
| 637460 | 2015 FC_{409} | — | March 22, 2015 | Haleakala | Pan-STARRS 1 | THM | 2.0 km | MPC · JPL |
| 637461 | 2015 FZ_{414} | — | March 8, 2008 | Kitt Peak | Spacewatch | · | 640 m | MPC · JPL |
| 637462 | 2015 FX_{425} | — | March 4, 2008 | Mount Lemmon | Mount Lemmon Survey | · | 530 m | MPC · JPL |
| 637463 | 2015 FE_{427} | — | August 14, 2012 | Haleakala | Pan-STARRS 1 | · | 950 m | MPC · JPL |
| 637464 | 2015 FQ_{430} | — | August 14, 2012 | Haleakala | Pan-STARRS 1 | NYS | 1.1 km | MPC · JPL |
| 637465 | 2015 FU_{431} | — | April 6, 2011 | Mount Lemmon | Mount Lemmon Survey | · | 1.8 km | MPC · JPL |
| 637466 | 2015 FW_{437} | — | March 21, 2015 | Haleakala | Pan-STARRS 1 | L4 | 7.1 km | MPC · JPL |
| 637467 | 2015 FB_{440} | — | March 25, 2015 | Haleakala | Pan-STARRS 1 | L4 | 7.6 km | MPC · JPL |
| 637468 | 2015 FS_{443} | — | March 27, 2015 | Haleakala | Pan-STARRS 1 | · | 2.4 km | MPC · JPL |
| 637469 | 2015 FP_{449} | — | October 9, 2013 | Kitt Peak | Spacewatch | · | 1.2 km | MPC · JPL |
| 637470 | 2015 FT_{460} | — | March 18, 2015 | Haleakala | Pan-STARRS 1 | · | 2.3 km | MPC · JPL |
| 637471 | 2015 FE_{466} | — | January 2, 2009 | Kitt Peak | Spacewatch | · | 2.0 km | MPC · JPL |
| 637472 | 2015 GJ_{4} | — | February 29, 2004 | Kitt Peak | Spacewatch | · | 1.1 km | MPC · JPL |
| 637473 | 2015 GL_{4} | — | March 27, 2015 | Kitt Peak | Spacewatch | · | 2.4 km | MPC · JPL |
| 637474 | 2015 GX_{16} | — | October 10, 2007 | Mount Lemmon | Mount Lemmon Survey | · | 890 m | MPC · JPL |
| 637475 | 2015 GE_{17} | — | December 4, 2007 | Kitt Peak | Spacewatch | · | 570 m | MPC · JPL |
| 637476 | 2015 GP_{17} | — | August 16, 2009 | Kitt Peak | Spacewatch | L4 | 8.3 km | MPC · JPL |
| 637477 | 2015 GU_{19} | — | October 6, 2005 | Kitt Peak | Spacewatch | · | 910 m | MPC · JPL |
| 637478 | 2015 GN_{25} | — | March 22, 2015 | Haleakala | Pan-STARRS 1 | PHO | 910 m | MPC · JPL |
| 637479 | 2015 GT_{28} | — | February 27, 2008 | Mount Lemmon | Mount Lemmon Survey | · | 700 m | MPC · JPL |
| 637480 | 2015 GC_{29} | — | March 24, 2006 | Mount Lemmon | Mount Lemmon Survey | · | 1.8 km | MPC · JPL |
| 637481 | 2015 GW_{29} | — | October 11, 2007 | Mount Lemmon | Mount Lemmon Survey | · | 1.8 km | MPC · JPL |
| 637482 | 2015 GB_{30} | — | September 28, 1998 | Kitt Peak | Spacewatch | · | 1.7 km | MPC · JPL |
| 637483 | 2015 GR_{35} | — | April 5, 2002 | Palomar | NEAT | · | 640 m | MPC · JPL |
| 637484 | 2015 GY_{35} | — | September 27, 2006 | Kitt Peak | Spacewatch | · | 650 m | MPC · JPL |
| 637485 | 2015 GZ_{35} | — | October 2, 2008 | Mount Lemmon | Mount Lemmon Survey | L4 | 6.8 km | MPC · JPL |
| 637486 | 2015 GY_{37} | — | October 23, 2003 | Kitt Peak | Spacewatch | · | 630 m | MPC · JPL |
| 637487 | 2015 GQ_{38} | — | November 12, 2013 | Mount Lemmon | Mount Lemmon Survey | EOS | 1.9 km | MPC · JPL |
| 637488 | 2015 GX_{39} | — | April 15, 2015 | Haleakala | Pan-STARRS 1 | · | 740 m | MPC · JPL |
| 637489 | 2015 GW_{40} | — | January 1, 2014 | Kitt Peak | Spacewatch | · | 3.0 km | MPC · JPL |
| 637490 | 2015 GT_{45} | — | April 6, 2008 | Mount Lemmon | Mount Lemmon Survey | V | 650 m | MPC · JPL |
| 637491 | 2015 GA_{47} | — | March 25, 2015 | Haleakala | Pan-STARRS 1 | · | 2.1 km | MPC · JPL |
| 637492 | 2015 GV_{47} | — | July 3, 2005 | Palomar | NEAT | · | 650 m | MPC · JPL |
| 637493 | 2015 GF_{49} | — | December 11, 2013 | Haleakala | Pan-STARRS 1 | (2076) | 790 m | MPC · JPL |
| 637494 | 2015 GW_{50} | — | May 30, 2003 | Cerro Tololo | Deep Ecliptic Survey | L4 | 8.0 km | MPC · JPL |
| 637495 | 2015 GX_{50} | — | October 17, 2010 | Mount Lemmon | Mount Lemmon Survey | L4 | 8.3 km | MPC · JPL |
| 637496 | 2015 GT_{65} | — | April 9, 2015 | Mount Lemmon | Mount Lemmon Survey | VER | 1.8 km | MPC · JPL |
| 637497 | 2015 GP_{66} | — | April 10, 2015 | Mount Lemmon | Mount Lemmon Survey | · | 2.1 km | MPC · JPL |
| 637498 | 2015 HD_{4} | — | June 21, 2007 | Mount Lemmon | Mount Lemmon Survey | L4 | 8.3 km | MPC · JPL |
| 637499 | 2015 HM_{5} | — | July 30, 2008 | Kitt Peak | Spacewatch | L4 | 10 km | MPC · JPL |
| 637500 | 2015 HK_{11} | — | February 12, 2000 | Apache Point | SDSS Collaboration | · | 1.3 km | MPC · JPL |

== 637501–637600 ==
back to top

| Designation | | | Discovery | | | Properties | | Ref |
| Permanent | Provisional | Named after | Date | Site | Discoverer(s) | Category | Diam. | Ref |
|---|---|---|---|---|---|---|---|---|
| 637501 | 2015 HQ_{14} | — | February 26, 2000 | Kitt Peak | Spacewatch | · | 1.3 km | MPC · JPL |
| 637502 | 2015 HC_{18} | — | September 25, 2008 | Mount Lemmon | Mount Lemmon Survey | L4 | 8.3 km | MPC · JPL |
| 637503 | 2015 HD_{18} | — | January 14, 2011 | Mount Lemmon | Mount Lemmon Survey | · | 560 m | MPC · JPL |
| 637504 | 2015 HF_{20} | — | March 27, 2015 | Kitt Peak | Spacewatch | · | 2.3 km | MPC · JPL |
| 637505 | 2015 HW_{20} | — | May 12, 2005 | Mount Lemmon | Mount Lemmon Survey | · | 1.7 km | MPC · JPL |
| 637506 | 2015 HP_{23} | — | October 21, 2006 | Mount Lemmon | Mount Lemmon Survey | · | 740 m | MPC · JPL |
| 637507 | 2015 HG_{27} | — | December 24, 2013 | Mount Lemmon | Mount Lemmon Survey | · | 2.4 km | MPC · JPL |
| 637508 | 2015 HR_{27} | — | September 21, 2001 | Kitt Peak | Spacewatch | · | 2.0 km | MPC · JPL |
| 637509 | 2015 HA_{30} | — | March 18, 2015 | Haleakala | Pan-STARRS 1 | · | 560 m | MPC · JPL |
| 637510 | 2015 HD_{31} | — | January 30, 2008 | Kitt Peak | Spacewatch | · | 650 m | MPC · JPL |
| 637511 | 2015 HX_{32} | — | November 17, 1999 | Kitt Peak | Spacewatch | · | 590 m | MPC · JPL |
| 637512 | 2015 HA_{33} | — | October 21, 2006 | Mount Lemmon | Mount Lemmon Survey | EOS | 2.3 km | MPC · JPL |
| 637513 | 2015 HJ_{39} | — | December 13, 2006 | Kitt Peak | Spacewatch | V | 720 m | MPC · JPL |
| 637514 | 2015 HA_{40} | — | May 19, 2010 | Mount Lemmon | Mount Lemmon Survey | · | 3.0 km | MPC · JPL |
| 637515 | 2015 HU_{41} | — | October 16, 2001 | Palomar | NEAT | · | 1.6 km | MPC · JPL |
| 637516 | 2015 HB_{42} | — | October 14, 1998 | Kitt Peak | Spacewatch | L4 | 9.9 km | MPC · JPL |
| 637517 | 2015 HO_{42} | — | August 22, 2001 | Socorro | LINEAR | · | 1.1 km | MPC · JPL |
| 637518 | 2015 HN_{48} | — | January 29, 2009 | Kitt Peak | Spacewatch | · | 2.3 km | MPC · JPL |
| 637519 | 2015 HE_{50} | — | November 6, 2013 | Haleakala | Pan-STARRS 1 | · | 700 m | MPC · JPL |
| 637520 | 2015 HL_{50} | — | October 14, 2012 | Catalina | CSS | · | 2.4 km | MPC · JPL |
| 637521 | 2015 HZ_{51} | — | November 17, 2006 | Mount Lemmon | Mount Lemmon Survey | V | 590 m | MPC · JPL |
| 637522 | 2015 HM_{54} | — | September 9, 1999 | Socorro | LINEAR | · | 1.6 km | MPC · JPL |
| 637523 | 2015 HL_{55} | — | August 27, 2006 | Kitt Peak | Spacewatch | EOS | 1.5 km | MPC · JPL |
| 637524 | 2015 HP_{55} | — | August 25, 2012 | Haleakala | Pan-STARRS 1 | · | 1.3 km | MPC · JPL |
| 637525 | 2015 HD_{56} | — | August 6, 2005 | Palomar | NEAT | · | 3.7 km | MPC · JPL |
| 637526 | 2015 HH_{56} | — | March 21, 2004 | Kitt Peak | Spacewatch | · | 880 m | MPC · JPL |
| 637527 | 2015 HD_{58} | — | August 8, 2012 | Haleakala | Pan-STARRS 1 | · | 980 m | MPC · JPL |
| 637528 | 2015 HU_{58} | — | August 30, 2005 | Kitt Peak | Spacewatch | · | 760 m | MPC · JPL |
| 637529 | 2015 HX_{58} | — | October 29, 2008 | Mount Lemmon | Mount Lemmon Survey | · | 1.5 km | MPC · JPL |
| 637530 | 2015 HB_{59} | — | April 18, 2015 | Haleakala | Pan-STARRS 1 | · | 1.2 km | MPC · JPL |
| 637531 | 2015 HO_{59} | — | February 24, 2014 | Haleakala | Pan-STARRS 1 | · | 2.9 km | MPC · JPL |
| 637532 | 2015 HT_{62} | — | September 28, 2006 | Mount Lemmon | Mount Lemmon Survey | · | 790 m | MPC · JPL |
| 637533 | 2015 HX_{62} | — | February 6, 2007 | Kitt Peak | Spacewatch | · | 1.0 km | MPC · JPL |
| 637534 | 2015 HS_{64} | — | March 18, 2015 | Haleakala | Pan-STARRS 1 | ERI | 1.1 km | MPC · JPL |
| 637535 | 2015 HE_{65} | — | January 28, 2011 | Kitt Peak | Spacewatch | NYS | 1.1 km | MPC · JPL |
| 637536 | 2015 HW_{75} | — | April 11, 2007 | Mount Lemmon | Mount Lemmon Survey | · | 1.3 km | MPC · JPL |
| 637537 | 2015 HP_{76} | — | October 9, 2008 | Mount Lemmon | Mount Lemmon Survey | L4 | 7.9 km | MPC · JPL |
| 637538 | 2015 HT_{76} | — | April 23, 2015 | Haleakala | Pan-STARRS 1 | · | 2.3 km | MPC · JPL |
| 637539 | 2015 HG_{77} | — | February 11, 2004 | Palomar | NEAT | · | 860 m | MPC · JPL |
| 637540 | 2015 HN_{78} | — | April 23, 2015 | Haleakala | Pan-STARRS 1 | · | 2.4 km | MPC · JPL |
| 637541 | 2015 HD_{79} | — | September 14, 2009 | Kitt Peak | Spacewatch | L4 | 9.9 km | MPC · JPL |
| 637542 | 2015 HM_{83} | — | November 29, 2013 | Mount Lemmon | Mount Lemmon Survey | · | 1.1 km | MPC · JPL |
| 637543 | 2015 HN_{83} | — | January 13, 2011 | Mount Lemmon | Mount Lemmon Survey | (2076) | 510 m | MPC · JPL |
| 637544 | 2015 HY_{85} | — | July 5, 2005 | Palomar | NEAT | (2076) | 780 m | MPC · JPL |
| 637545 | 2015 HL_{89} | — | October 1, 2008 | Mount Lemmon | Mount Lemmon Survey | L4 | 7.7 km | MPC · JPL |
| 637546 | 2015 HO_{89} | — | October 29, 2005 | Mount Lemmon | Mount Lemmon Survey | · | 1.2 km | MPC · JPL |
| 637547 | 2015 HX_{89} | — | May 14, 2004 | Kitt Peak | Spacewatch | · | 960 m | MPC · JPL |
| 637548 | 2015 HT_{91} | — | October 23, 2009 | Mount Lemmon | Mount Lemmon Survey | · | 830 m | MPC · JPL |
| 637549 | 2015 HE_{94} | — | August 31, 2005 | Palomar | NEAT | · | 1.3 km | MPC · JPL |
| 637550 | 2015 HS_{108} | — | February 23, 2015 | Haleakala | Pan-STARRS 1 | · | 2.7 km | MPC · JPL |
| 637551 | 2015 HJ_{109} | — | January 9, 2014 | Mount Lemmon | Mount Lemmon Survey | · | 3.6 km | MPC · JPL |
| 637552 | 2015 HD_{113} | — | October 18, 2007 | Kitt Peak | Spacewatch | EOS | 1.7 km | MPC · JPL |
| 637553 | 2015 HC_{116} | — | July 3, 2005 | Mount Lemmon | Mount Lemmon Survey | · | 3.0 km | MPC · JPL |
| 637554 | 2015 HX_{126} | — | May 25, 2003 | Nogales | P. R. Holvorcem, M. Schwartz | · | 1.0 km | MPC · JPL |
| 637555 | 2015 HW_{127} | — | March 19, 2015 | Haleakala | Pan-STARRS 1 | · | 2.3 km | MPC · JPL |
| 637556 | 2015 HR_{129} | — | September 14, 2006 | Kitt Peak | Spacewatch | · | 2.5 km | MPC · JPL |
| 637557 | 2015 HB_{133} | — | August 14, 2012 | Haleakala | Pan-STARRS 1 | (5) | 1.1 km | MPC · JPL |
| 637558 | 2015 HW_{134} | — | September 20, 2008 | Mount Lemmon | Mount Lemmon Survey | · | 990 m | MPC · JPL |
| 637559 | 2015 HT_{139} | — | September 20, 2011 | Mount Lemmon | Mount Lemmon Survey | · | 2.3 km | MPC · JPL |
| 637560 | 2015 HY_{143} | — | December 14, 2010 | Mount Lemmon | Mount Lemmon Survey | · | 670 m | MPC · JPL |
| 637561 | 2015 HZ_{144} | — | April 14, 2015 | Mount Lemmon | Mount Lemmon Survey | · | 820 m | MPC · JPL |
| 637562 | 2015 HB_{146} | — | November 28, 2013 | Mount Lemmon | Mount Lemmon Survey | V | 570 m | MPC · JPL |
| 637563 | 2015 HD_{147} | — | June 17, 2005 | Mount Lemmon | Mount Lemmon Survey | · | 2.1 km | MPC · JPL |
| 637564 | 2015 HN_{148} | — | July 4, 2005 | Palomar | NEAT | · | 1.0 km | MPC · JPL |
| 637565 | 2015 HJ_{149} | — | March 27, 2004 | Socorro | LINEAR | NYS | 850 m | MPC · JPL |
| 637566 | 2015 HU_{152} | — | August 24, 2007 | Kitt Peak | Spacewatch | L4 | 7.2 km | MPC · JPL |
| 637567 | 2015 HN_{155} | — | March 13, 2005 | Kitt Peak | Spacewatch | · | 700 m | MPC · JPL |
| 637568 | 2015 HP_{155} | — | December 18, 2007 | Kitt Peak | Spacewatch | EOS | 2.1 km | MPC · JPL |
| 637569 | 2015 HZ_{155} | — | January 29, 2011 | Mount Lemmon | Mount Lemmon Survey | · | 670 m | MPC · JPL |
| 637570 | 2015 HH_{159} | — | December 27, 2013 | Mount Lemmon | Mount Lemmon Survey | HYG | 2.0 km | MPC · JPL |
| 637571 | 2015 HJ_{159} | — | July 7, 2002 | Kitt Peak | Spacewatch | 3:2 | 4.8 km | MPC · JPL |
| 637572 | 2015 HV_{159} | — | February 13, 2008 | Kitt Peak | Spacewatch | · | 640 m | MPC · JPL |
| 637573 | 2015 HH_{163} | — | November 9, 2009 | Mount Lemmon | Mount Lemmon Survey | · | 1.2 km | MPC · JPL |
| 637574 | 2015 HJ_{167} | — | March 29, 2008 | Kitt Peak | Spacewatch | · | 740 m | MPC · JPL |
| 637575 | 2015 HZ_{170} | — | April 19, 2004 | Kitt Peak | Spacewatch | · | 2.3 km | MPC · JPL |
| 637576 | 2015 HW_{171} | — | August 28, 2002 | Palomar | NEAT | V | 860 m | MPC · JPL |
| 637577 | 2015 HG_{173} | — | April 22, 2004 | Kitt Peak | Spacewatch | MAS | 740 m | MPC · JPL |
| 637578 | 2015 HP_{173} | — | November 24, 2003 | Kitt Peak | Spacewatch | · | 740 m | MPC · JPL |
| 637579 | 2015 HR_{173} | — | April 7, 2010 | Vail-Jarnac | Jarnac | BRA | 1.7 km | MPC · JPL |
| 637580 | 2015 HM_{174} | — | April 5, 2002 | Palomar | NEAT | · | 930 m | MPC · JPL |
| 637581 | 2015 HR_{175} | — | August 14, 2012 | Haleakala | Pan-STARRS 1 | · | 790 m | MPC · JPL |
| 637582 | 2015 HJ_{176} | — | May 4, 2008 | Kitt Peak | Spacewatch | · | 850 m | MPC · JPL |
| 637583 | 2015 HM_{178} | — | August 6, 2005 | Palomar | NEAT | · | 850 m | MPC · JPL |
| 637584 | 2015 HU_{178} | — | August 17, 2012 | Haleakala | Pan-STARRS 1 | · | 860 m | MPC · JPL |
| 637585 | 2015 HZ_{178} | — | January 29, 2011 | Kitt Peak | Spacewatch | · | 1.1 km | MPC · JPL |
| 637586 | 2015 HN_{180} | — | November 9, 2009 | Mount Lemmon | Mount Lemmon Survey | · | 1.1 km | MPC · JPL |
| 637587 | 2015 HC_{181} | — | September 13, 2005 | Kitt Peak | Spacewatch | · | 920 m | MPC · JPL |
| 637588 | 2015 HE_{181} | — | January 16, 2005 | Kitt Peak | Spacewatch | 3:2 | 7.1 km | MPC · JPL |
| 637589 | 2015 HS_{181} | — | November 27, 2013 | Haleakala | Pan-STARRS 1 | V | 660 m | MPC · JPL |
| 637590 | 2015 HZ_{185} | — | January 1, 2008 | Mount Lemmon | Mount Lemmon Survey | · | 2.7 km | MPC · JPL |
| 637591 | 2015 HZ_{186} | — | February 3, 2009 | Kitt Peak | Spacewatch | · | 2.3 km | MPC · JPL |
| 637592 | 2015 HV_{187} | — | April 25, 2015 | Haleakala | Pan-STARRS 1 | · | 2.9 km | MPC · JPL |
| 637593 | 2015 HE_{188} | — | March 13, 2010 | Kitt Peak | Spacewatch | · | 1.8 km | MPC · JPL |
| 637594 | 2015 HV_{188} | — | April 18, 2015 | Haleakala | Pan-STARRS 1 | · | 940 m | MPC · JPL |
| 637595 | 2015 HN_{191} | — | April 23, 2015 | Haleakala | Pan-STARRS 2 | · | 2.6 km | MPC · JPL |
| 637596 | 2015 HB_{209} | — | April 25, 2015 | Haleakala | Pan-STARRS 1 | · | 2.8 km | MPC · JPL |
| 637597 | 2015 HR_{219} | — | February 24, 2014 | Haleakala | Pan-STARRS 1 | L4 | 6.5 km | MPC · JPL |
| 637598 | 2015 HL_{286} | — | April 18, 2015 | Cerro Tololo-DECam | DECam | · | 2.5 km | MPC · JPL |
| 637599 | 2015 JE | — | June 18, 2012 | Mount Lemmon | Mount Lemmon Survey | · | 1.6 km | MPC · JPL |
| 637600 | 2015 JA_{4} | — | August 31, 2005 | Kitt Peak | Spacewatch | · | 3.2 km | MPC · JPL |

== 637601–637700 ==
back to top

| Designation | | | Discovery | | | Properties | | Ref |
| Permanent | Provisional | Named after | Date | Site | Discoverer(s) | Category | Diam. | Ref |
|---|---|---|---|---|---|---|---|---|
| 637601 | 2015 JB_{9} | — | March 17, 2004 | Kitt Peak | Spacewatch | · | 2.1 km | MPC · JPL |
| 637602 | 2015 JG_{9} | — | May 15, 2015 | Haleakala | Pan-STARRS 1 | · | 840 m | MPC · JPL |
| 637603 | 2015 JM_{9} | — | May 20, 2005 | Mount Lemmon | Mount Lemmon Survey | · | 880 m | MPC · JPL |
| 637604 | 2015 JQ_{9} | — | November 6, 2012 | Mount Lemmon | Mount Lemmon Survey | · | 2.8 km | MPC · JPL |
| 637605 | 2015 JA_{10} | — | March 16, 2007 | Mount Lemmon | Mount Lemmon Survey | · | 1.3 km | MPC · JPL |
| 637606 | 2015 KG_{5} | — | October 8, 2012 | Haleakala | Pan-STARRS 1 | · | 1.8 km | MPC · JPL |
| 637607 | 2015 KK_{5} | — | December 21, 2006 | Mount Lemmon | Mount Lemmon Survey | · | 1.4 km | MPC · JPL |
| 637608 | 2015 KM_{5} | — | January 3, 2009 | Mount Lemmon | Mount Lemmon Survey | · | 2.4 km | MPC · JPL |
| 637609 | 2015 KB_{6} | — | January 9, 2006 | Kitt Peak | Spacewatch | · | 1.3 km | MPC · JPL |
| 637610 | 2015 KZ_{6} | — | August 15, 2009 | Kitt Peak | Spacewatch | V | 640 m | MPC · JPL |
| 637611 | 2015 KY_{8} | — | April 3, 2011 | Haleakala | Pan-STARRS 1 | · | 980 m | MPC · JPL |
| 637612 | 2015 KX_{9} | — | April 13, 2011 | Mount Lemmon | Mount Lemmon Survey | · | 1.4 km | MPC · JPL |
| 637613 | 2015 KN_{15} | — | March 19, 2004 | Palomar | NEAT | PHO | 990 m | MPC · JPL |
| 637614 | 2015 KR_{17} | — | April 23, 2015 | Haleakala | Pan-STARRS 1 | VER | 2.2 km | MPC · JPL |
| 637615 | 2015 KN_{20} | — | April 29, 2008 | Kitt Peak | Spacewatch | · | 750 m | MPC · JPL |
| 637616 | 2015 KW_{20} | — | May 18, 2015 | Haleakala | Pan-STARRS 1 | · | 3.1 km | MPC · JPL |
| 637617 | 2015 KV_{22} | — | May 11, 2005 | Catalina | CSS | · | 2.0 km | MPC · JPL |
| 637618 | 2015 KZ_{23} | — | May 30, 2008 | Mount Lemmon | Mount Lemmon Survey | NYS | 820 m | MPC · JPL |
| 637619 | 2015 KD_{24} | — | May 18, 2015 | Haleakala | Pan-STARRS 1 | V | 440 m | MPC · JPL |
| 637620 | 2015 KQ_{24} | — | October 13, 2006 | Kitt Peak | Spacewatch | · | 2.8 km | MPC · JPL |
| 637621 | 2015 KM_{27} | — | September 14, 1994 | Kitt Peak | Spacewatch | · | 1.2 km | MPC · JPL |
| 637622 | 2015 KQ_{27} | — | October 7, 2013 | Mount Lemmon | Mount Lemmon Survey | · | 1.3 km | MPC · JPL |
| 637623 | 2015 KD_{30} | — | October 3, 2013 | Mount Lemmon | Mount Lemmon Survey | V | 670 m | MPC · JPL |
| 637624 | 2015 KG_{30} | — | February 7, 2011 | Mount Lemmon | Mount Lemmon Survey | NYS | 1.0 km | MPC · JPL |
| 637625 | 2015 KW_{32} | — | May 11, 2015 | Mount Lemmon | Mount Lemmon Survey | · | 820 m | MPC · JPL |
| 637626 | 2015 KX_{32} | — | November 3, 2007 | Kitt Peak | Spacewatch | · | 1.9 km | MPC · JPL |
| 637627 | 2015 KK_{33} | — | September 9, 2007 | Kitt Peak | Spacewatch | · | 1.8 km | MPC · JPL |
| 637628 | 2015 KM_{34} | — | March 11, 2005 | Mount Lemmon | Mount Lemmon Survey | · | 860 m | MPC · JPL |
| 637629 | 2015 KO_{35} | — | October 28, 2008 | Kitt Peak | Spacewatch | · | 1.2 km | MPC · JPL |
| 637630 | 2015 KZ_{37} | — | April 6, 2011 | Mount Lemmon | Mount Lemmon Survey | · | 1.1 km | MPC · JPL |
| 637631 | 2015 KW_{43} | — | December 1, 2006 | Mount Lemmon | Mount Lemmon Survey | · | 2.9 km | MPC · JPL |
| 637632 | 2015 KD_{48} | — | July 6, 2005 | Kitt Peak | Spacewatch | · | 1.0 km | MPC · JPL |
| 637633 | 2015 KG_{48} | — | September 22, 2012 | Kitt Peak | Spacewatch | · | 1.1 km | MPC · JPL |
| 637634 | 2015 KD_{49} | — | August 29, 2006 | Kitt Peak | Spacewatch | · | 2.0 km | MPC · JPL |
| 637635 | 2015 KB_{50} | — | March 14, 2011 | Kitt Peak | Spacewatch | · | 730 m | MPC · JPL |
| 637636 | 2015 KA_{52} | — | May 20, 2015 | Haleakala | Pan-STARRS 1 | · | 870 m | MPC · JPL |
| 637637 | 2015 KM_{54} | — | September 20, 2009 | Kitt Peak | Spacewatch | V | 580 m | MPC · JPL |
| 637638 | 2015 KK_{56} | — | March 29, 2008 | Kitt Peak | Spacewatch | · | 650 m | MPC · JPL |
| 637639 | 2015 KY_{58} | — | March 15, 2007 | Mount Lemmon | Mount Lemmon Survey | · | 1.2 km | MPC · JPL |
| 637640 | 2015 KH_{60} | — | April 8, 2002 | Palomar | NEAT | · | 690 m | MPC · JPL |
| 637641 | 2015 KZ_{63} | — | May 21, 2015 | Haleakala | Pan-STARRS 1 | · | 2.3 km | MPC · JPL |
| 637642 | 2015 KJ_{64} | — | December 2, 2010 | Mount Lemmon | Mount Lemmon Survey | L4 | 8.4 km | MPC · JPL |
| 637643 | 2015 KX_{65} | — | January 10, 2014 | Nogales | M. Schwartz, P. R. Holvorcem | · | 2.2 km | MPC · JPL |
| 637644 | 2015 KA_{68} | — | January 26, 2014 | Haleakala | Pan-STARRS 1 | · | 3.1 km | MPC · JPL |
| 637645 | 2015 KU_{69} | — | May 21, 2015 | Haleakala | Pan-STARRS 1 | EOS | 1.5 km | MPC · JPL |
| 637646 | 2015 KR_{75} | — | November 11, 2007 | Mount Lemmon | Mount Lemmon Survey | · | 3.1 km | MPC · JPL |
| 637647 | 2015 KZ_{76} | — | December 26, 2013 | Mount Lemmon | Mount Lemmon Survey | V | 520 m | MPC · JPL |
| 637648 | 2015 KX_{77} | — | May 18, 2015 | Mount Lemmon | Mount Lemmon Survey | VER | 2.1 km | MPC · JPL |
| 637649 | 2015 KK_{80} | — | January 13, 2008 | Kitt Peak | Spacewatch | · | 2.6 km | MPC · JPL |
| 637650 | 2015 KN_{80} | — | October 3, 2006 | Mount Lemmon | Mount Lemmon Survey | ARM | 3.4 km | MPC · JPL |
| 637651 | 2015 KA_{85} | — | January 16, 2008 | Kitt Peak | Spacewatch | · | 3.2 km | MPC · JPL |
| 637652 | 2015 KS_{86} | — | April 27, 2008 | Mount Lemmon | Mount Lemmon Survey | · | 870 m | MPC · JPL |
| 637653 | 2015 KU_{86} | — | March 2, 2009 | Mount Lemmon | Mount Lemmon Survey | · | 2.4 km | MPC · JPL |
| 637654 | 2015 KQ_{89} | — | September 28, 2003 | Anderson Mesa | LONEOS | · | 1.7 km | MPC · JPL |
| 637655 | 2015 KY_{91} | — | July 9, 2011 | Charleston | R. Holmes | · | 1.8 km | MPC · JPL |
| 637656 | 2015 KS_{92} | — | August 31, 2005 | Palomar | NEAT | · | 1.6 km | MPC · JPL |
| 637657 | 2015 KU_{92} | — | September 23, 2011 | Kitt Peak | Spacewatch | · | 3.3 km | MPC · JPL |
| 637658 | 2015 KF_{99} | — | October 20, 2012 | Mount Lemmon | Mount Lemmon Survey | · | 1.5 km | MPC · JPL |
| 637659 | 2015 KY_{99} | — | November 7, 2012 | Haleakala | Pan-STARRS 1 | · | 1.8 km | MPC · JPL |
| 637660 | 2015 KA_{100} | — | March 19, 2009 | Bergisch Gladbach | W. Bickel | · | 2.2 km | MPC · JPL |
| 637661 | 2015 KW_{100} | — | September 20, 2011 | Kitt Peak | Spacewatch | · | 2.5 km | MPC · JPL |
| 637662 | 2015 KG_{101} | — | May 21, 2015 | Haleakala | Pan-STARRS 1 | VER | 2.3 km | MPC · JPL |
| 637663 | 2015 KW_{102} | — | December 8, 1996 | Kitt Peak | Spacewatch | LIX | 3.1 km | MPC · JPL |
| 637664 | 2015 KR_{103} | — | December 13, 2012 | Mount Lemmon | Mount Lemmon Survey | · | 2.8 km | MPC · JPL |
| 637665 | 2015 KE_{106} | — | March 25, 2003 | Kitt Peak | Spacewatch | HYG | 2.4 km | MPC · JPL |
| 637666 | 2015 KL_{106} | — | May 3, 2008 | Mount Lemmon | Mount Lemmon Survey | · | 860 m | MPC · JPL |
| 637667 | 2015 KW_{107} | — | August 6, 2005 | Palomar | NEAT | · | 780 m | MPC · JPL |
| 637668 | 2015 KP_{110} | — | November 26, 2003 | Kitt Peak | Spacewatch | · | 2.2 km | MPC · JPL |
| 637669 | 2015 KT_{113} | — | December 18, 2007 | Mount Lemmon | Mount Lemmon Survey | TIR | 3.0 km | MPC · JPL |
| 637670 | 2015 KQ_{116} | — | October 7, 2012 | Haleakala | Pan-STARRS 1 | · | 1.1 km | MPC · JPL |
| 637671 | 2015 KE_{117} | — | November 25, 2000 | Socorro | LINEAR | · | 1.2 km | MPC · JPL |
| 637672 | 2015 KE_{119} | — | November 29, 2013 | Kitt Peak | Spacewatch | · | 2.6 km | MPC · JPL |
| 637673 | 2015 KG_{125} | — | April 30, 2011 | Mount Lemmon | Mount Lemmon Survey | · | 1.6 km | MPC · JPL |
| 637674 | 2015 KO_{125} | — | February 4, 2000 | Kitt Peak | Spacewatch | · | 1.2 km | MPC · JPL |
| 637675 | 2015 KX_{126} | — | April 25, 2015 | Haleakala | Pan-STARRS 1 | · | 2.7 km | MPC · JPL |
| 637676 | 2015 KX_{133} | — | May 22, 2001 | Cerro Tololo | Deep Ecliptic Survey | NYS | 1.1 km | MPC · JPL |
| 637677 | 2015 KC_{136} | — | September 13, 2007 | Kitt Peak | Spacewatch | · | 2.0 km | MPC · JPL |
| 637678 | 2015 KW_{136} | — | April 27, 2008 | Mount Lemmon | Mount Lemmon Survey | (2076) | 800 m | MPC · JPL |
| 637679 | 2015 KE_{137} | — | February 10, 2008 | Kitt Peak | Spacewatch | · | 770 m | MPC · JPL |
| 637680 | 2015 KL_{137} | — | October 31, 2006 | Kitt Peak | Spacewatch | · | 3.1 km | MPC · JPL |
| 637681 | 2015 KO_{138} | — | May 18, 2015 | Haleakala | Pan-STARRS 2 | · | 580 m | MPC · JPL |
| 637682 | 2015 KV_{138} | — | April 22, 2009 | Mount Lemmon | Mount Lemmon Survey | · | 2.9 km | MPC · JPL |
| 637683 | 2015 KM_{143} | — | May 18, 2015 | Haleakala | Pan-STARRS 2 | · | 1.1 km | MPC · JPL |
| 637684 | 2015 KP_{145} | — | March 2, 2009 | Mount Lemmon | Mount Lemmon Survey | EOS | 1.6 km | MPC · JPL |
| 637685 | 2015 KQ_{147} | — | January 28, 2014 | Kitt Peak | Spacewatch | PHO | 860 m | MPC · JPL |
| 637686 | 2015 KP_{149} | — | September 13, 2005 | Catalina | CSS | · | 1.1 km | MPC · JPL |
| 637687 | 2015 KU_{151} | — | October 21, 2012 | Mount Lemmon | Mount Lemmon Survey | · | 2.9 km | MPC · JPL |
| 637688 | 2015 KW_{160} | — | October 20, 2007 | Mount Lemmon | Mount Lemmon Survey | · | 1.5 km | MPC · JPL |
| 637689 | 2015 KZ_{162} | — | January 9, 2014 | Mount Lemmon | Mount Lemmon Survey | · | 710 m | MPC · JPL |
| 637690 | 2015 KB_{168} | — | May 20, 2015 | Haleakala | Pan-STARRS 1 | · | 930 m | MPC · JPL |
| 637691 | 2015 KC_{168} | — | September 13, 2007 | Mount Lemmon | Mount Lemmon Survey | · | 1.6 km | MPC · JPL |
| 637692 | 2015 KE_{168} | — | May 21, 2015 | Haleakala | Pan-STARRS 1 | · | 2.6 km | MPC · JPL |
| 637693 | 2015 KH_{168} | — | February 26, 2007 | Mount Lemmon | Mount Lemmon Survey | · | 1.3 km | MPC · JPL |
| 637694 | 2015 KK_{168} | — | May 18, 2015 | Haleakala | Pan-STARRS 2 | · | 1.5 km | MPC · JPL |
| 637695 | 2015 KO_{168} | — | May 20, 2010 | Mount Lemmon | Mount Lemmon Survey | · | 1.2 km | MPC · JPL |
| 637696 | 2015 KZ_{178} | — | January 23, 2014 | Mount Lemmon | Mount Lemmon Survey | · | 2.6 km | MPC · JPL |
| 637697 | 2015 KZ_{202} | — | April 29, 2015 | Cerro Paranal | Altmann, M., Prusti, T. | · | 2.4 km | MPC · JPL |
| 637698 | 2015 KW_{206} | — | September 14, 2007 | Mount Lemmon | Mount Lemmon Survey | · | 1.6 km | MPC · JPL |
| 637699 | 2015 KO_{366} | — | May 20, 2015 | Cerro Tololo | DECam | · | 520 m | MPC · JPL |
| 637700 | 2015 KW_{368} | — | May 21, 2015 | Haleakala | Pan-STARRS 1 | · | 630 m | MPC · JPL |

== 637701–637800 ==
back to top

| Designation | | | Discovery | | | Properties | | Ref |
| Permanent | Provisional | Named after | Date | Site | Discoverer(s) | Category | Diam. | Ref |
|---|---|---|---|---|---|---|---|---|
| 637701 | 2015 LK_{5} | — | December 19, 2007 | Mount Lemmon | Mount Lemmon Survey | · | 3.0 km | MPC · JPL |
| 637702 | 2015 LC_{9} | — | December 4, 1996 | Kitt Peak | Spacewatch | · | 710 m | MPC · JPL |
| 637703 | 2015 LQ_{9} | — | March 19, 2007 | Mount Lemmon | Mount Lemmon Survey | · | 1.4 km | MPC · JPL |
| 637704 | 2015 LF_{11} | — | September 26, 2003 | Palomar | NEAT | EUN | 1.7 km | MPC · JPL |
| 637705 | 2015 LF_{15} | — | May 28, 2011 | Mayhill | L. Elenin | PHO | 1.2 km | MPC · JPL |
| 637706 | 2015 LJ_{15} | — | June 28, 2005 | Kitt Peak | Spacewatch | · | 820 m | MPC · JPL |
| 637707 | 2015 LV_{15} | — | March 15, 2007 | Kitt Peak | Spacewatch | · | 1.2 km | MPC · JPL |
| 637708 | 2015 LD_{18} | — | September 23, 2011 | Kitt Peak | Spacewatch | · | 3.2 km | MPC · JPL |
| 637709 | 2015 LE_{18} | — | August 25, 2012 | Kitt Peak | Spacewatch | · | 1.5 km | MPC · JPL |
| 637710 | 2015 LC_{19} | — | October 21, 2012 | Mount Lemmon | Mount Lemmon Survey | · | 1.1 km | MPC · JPL |
| 637711 | 2015 LQ_{19} | — | September 19, 2012 | Mount Lemmon | Mount Lemmon Survey | · | 1.1 km | MPC · JPL |
| 637712 | 2015 LL_{26} | — | April 26, 2011 | Mount Lemmon | Mount Lemmon Survey | V | 590 m | MPC · JPL |
| 637713 | 2015 LZ_{29} | — | October 20, 2003 | Palomar | NEAT | · | 1.9 km | MPC · JPL |
| 637714 | 2015 LL_{34} | — | June 22, 2011 | Nogales | M. Schwartz, P. R. Holvorcem | · | 2.3 km | MPC · JPL |
| 637715 | 2015 LP_{36} | — | March 4, 2011 | Mount Lemmon | Mount Lemmon Survey | NYS | 970 m | MPC · JPL |
| 637716 | 2015 LS_{36} | — | December 29, 2008 | Mount Lemmon | Mount Lemmon Survey | · | 3.7 km | MPC · JPL |
| 637717 | 2015 LV_{39} | — | September 1, 2002 | Palomar | NEAT | · | 2.3 km | MPC · JPL |
| 637718 | 2015 LE_{40} | — | October 10, 2010 | Mount Lemmon | Mount Lemmon Survey | L4 | 8.5 km | MPC · JPL |
| 637719 | 2015 LL_{43} | — | December 21, 2008 | Mount Lemmon | Mount Lemmon Survey | · | 1.2 km | MPC · JPL |
| 637720 | 2015 MQ_{3} | — | May 25, 2015 | Haleakala | Pan-STARRS 1 | V | 510 m | MPC · JPL |
| 637721 | 2015 MY_{10} | — | February 28, 2014 | Haleakala | Pan-STARRS 1 | · | 2.8 km | MPC · JPL |
| 637722 | 2015 MQ_{16} | — | April 18, 2015 | Haleakala | Pan-STARRS 1 | EOS | 1.6 km | MPC · JPL |
| 637723 | 2015 MR_{16} | — | April 1, 2015 | Haleakala | Pan-STARRS 1 | · | 1.0 km | MPC · JPL |
| 637724 | 2015 MA_{17} | — | March 6, 2011 | Mount Lemmon | Mount Lemmon Survey | ERI | 1.4 km | MPC · JPL |
| 637725 | 2015 MC_{17} | — | April 24, 2015 | Haleakala | Pan-STARRS 1 | · | 3.2 km | MPC · JPL |
| 637726 | 2015 MM_{18} | — | March 22, 2015 | Haleakala | Pan-STARRS 1 | · | 2.2 km | MPC · JPL |
| 637727 | 2015 MX_{18} | — | February 20, 2009 | Kitt Peak | Spacewatch | · | 2.6 km | MPC · JPL |
| 637728 | 2015 MF_{19} | — | September 4, 2011 | Haleakala | Pan-STARRS 1 | VER | 2.6 km | MPC · JPL |
| 637729 | 2015 MX_{19} | — | October 15, 2007 | Kitt Peak | Spacewatch | · | 1.8 km | MPC · JPL |
| 637730 | 2015 MR_{25} | — | October 9, 2010 | Mount Lemmon | Mount Lemmon Survey | L4 | 6.5 km | MPC · JPL |
| 637731 | 2015 MV_{29} | — | April 18, 2015 | Haleakala | Pan-STARRS 1 | · | 630 m | MPC · JPL |
| 637732 | 2015 MY_{29} | — | October 27, 2009 | Mount Lemmon | Mount Lemmon Survey | · | 680 m | MPC · JPL |
| 637733 | 2015 MB_{30} | — | September 27, 2006 | Kitt Peak | Spacewatch | · | 2.6 km | MPC · JPL |
| 637734 | 2015 MQ_{30} | — | September 20, 2011 | Mount Lemmon | Mount Lemmon Survey | · | 2.2 km | MPC · JPL |
| 637735 | 2015 MP_{33} | — | October 14, 2012 | Mount Lemmon | Mount Lemmon Survey | · | 1.8 km | MPC · JPL |
| 637736 | 2015 MK_{36} | — | July 29, 2005 | Palomar | NEAT | · | 3.4 km | MPC · JPL |
| 637737 | 2015 MW_{36} | — | March 30, 2015 | Haleakala | Pan-STARRS 1 | · | 2.7 km | MPC · JPL |
| 637738 | 2015 ML_{41} | — | January 2, 2011 | Mount Lemmon | Mount Lemmon Survey | V | 530 m | MPC · JPL |
| 637739 | 2015 MD_{42} | — | September 28, 1998 | Kitt Peak | Spacewatch | · | 1.7 km | MPC · JPL |
| 637740 | 2015 MJ_{45} | — | June 17, 2015 | Haleakala | Pan-STARRS 1 | · | 1.1 km | MPC · JPL |
| 637741 | 2015 MA_{47} | — | December 25, 2005 | Kitt Peak | Spacewatch | · | 3.3 km | MPC · JPL |
| 637742 | 2015 MO_{51} | — | August 1, 2011 | Haleakala | Pan-STARRS 1 | · | 1.4 km | MPC · JPL |
| 637743 | 2015 MX_{54} | — | September 18, 2011 | Mount Lemmon | Mount Lemmon Survey | · | 3.3 km | MPC · JPL |
| 637744 | 2015 MV_{58} | — | January 5, 2000 | Kitt Peak | Spacewatch | · | 2.3 km | MPC · JPL |
| 637745 | 2015 MF_{59} | — | August 24, 2006 | Palomar | NEAT | AGN | 1.6 km | MPC · JPL |
| 637746 | 2015 MN_{59} | — | October 31, 2008 | Kitt Peak | Spacewatch | · | 1.0 km | MPC · JPL |
| 637747 | 2015 MR_{64} | — | April 3, 2003 | Cerro Tololo | Deep Lens Survey | · | 1.1 km | MPC · JPL |
| 637748 | 2015 MZ_{66} | — | October 6, 2004 | Palomar | NEAT | MAR | 1.4 km | MPC · JPL |
| 637749 | 2015 MP_{68} | — | January 16, 2004 | Kitt Peak | Spacewatch | · | 1.9 km | MPC · JPL |
| 637750 | 2015 MT_{68} | — | May 19, 2015 | Haleakala | Pan-STARRS 1 | · | 1.1 km | MPC · JPL |
| 637751 | 2015 MS_{69} | — | April 22, 1998 | Socorro | LINEAR | · | 1.4 km | MPC · JPL |
| 637752 | 2015 MF_{70} | — | January 28, 2014 | Kitt Peak | Spacewatch | V | 540 m | MPC · JPL |
| 637753 | 2015 ME_{74} | — | November 12, 2012 | Mount Lemmon | Mount Lemmon Survey | V | 620 m | MPC · JPL |
| 637754 | 2015 MW_{81} | — | May 8, 2011 | Kitt Peak | Spacewatch | V | 500 m | MPC · JPL |
| 637755 | 2015 MO_{86} | — | September 6, 2008 | Kitt Peak | Spacewatch | · | 1.1 km | MPC · JPL |
| 637756 | 2015 MZ_{90} | — | August 6, 2005 | Palomar | NEAT | · | 3.0 km | MPC · JPL |
| 637757 | 2015 MD_{92} | — | June 22, 2015 | Haleakala | Pan-STARRS 2 | EUN | 1.3 km | MPC · JPL |
| 637758 | 2015 MA_{98} | — | January 31, 2006 | Kitt Peak | Spacewatch | · | 1.0 km | MPC · JPL |
| 637759 | 2015 MR_{98} | — | June 18, 2015 | Haleakala | Pan-STARRS 1 | · | 720 m | MPC · JPL |
| 637760 | 2015 MV_{101} | — | April 13, 2011 | Haleakala | Pan-STARRS 1 | · | 1.2 km | MPC · JPL |
| 637761 | 2015 MS_{106} | — | December 30, 2007 | Kitt Peak | Spacewatch | KOR | 1.2 km | MPC · JPL |
| 637762 | 2015 MP_{108} | — | September 5, 2000 | Apache Point | SDSS | · | 1.6 km | MPC · JPL |
| 637763 | 2015 MR_{108} | — | September 29, 2008 | Kitt Peak | Spacewatch | NYS | 1.1 km | MPC · JPL |
| 637764 | 2015 MM_{129} | — | January 21, 2001 | Kitt Peak | Spacewatch | · | 1.1 km | MPC · JPL |
| 637765 | 2015 MT_{138} | — | August 23, 2004 | Kitt Peak | Spacewatch | · | 1.3 km | MPC · JPL |
| 637766 | 2015 MZ_{141} | — | October 11, 2012 | Haleakala | Pan-STARRS 1 | MAS | 780 m | MPC · JPL |
| 637767 | 2015 MB_{148} | — | June 27, 2015 | Haleakala | Pan-STARRS 1 | · | 1.4 km | MPC · JPL |
| 637768 | 2015 MJ_{149} | — | June 1, 2011 | ESA OGS | ESA OGS | · | 1.0 km | MPC · JPL |
| 637769 | 2015 MF_{150} | — | October 27, 2006 | Catalina | CSS | EUP | 3.9 km | MPC · JPL |
| 637770 | 2015 MJ_{163} | — | June 16, 2015 | Mount Lemmon | Mount Lemmon Survey | · | 2.6 km | MPC · JPL |
| 637771 | 2015 MW_{176} | — | December 3, 2010 | Mount Lemmon | Mount Lemmon Survey | · | 3.4 km | MPC · JPL |
| 637772 | 2015 NW | — | February 9, 2008 | Mount Lemmon | Mount Lemmon Survey | · | 3.1 km | MPC · JPL |
| 637773 | 2015 NM_{2} | — | March 12, 2010 | Kitt Peak | Spacewatch | · | 1.3 km | MPC · JPL |
| 637774 | 2015 NV_{3} | — | October 7, 2005 | Mauna Kea | A. Boattini | · | 1.2 km | MPC · JPL |
| 637775 | 2015 NZ_{3} | — | October 11, 2004 | Kitt Peak | Deep Ecliptic Survey | MAS | 970 m | MPC · JPL |
| 637776 | 2015 NC_{5} | — | January 10, 2013 | Haleakala | Pan-STARRS 1 | · | 1 km | MPC · JPL |
| 637777 | 2015 NT_{12} | — | June 25, 2011 | Nogales | M. Schwartz, P. R. Holvorcem | PHO | 1.3 km | MPC · JPL |
| 637778 | 2015 NA_{15} | — | March 29, 2009 | Mount Lemmon | Mount Lemmon Survey | · | 1.9 km | MPC · JPL |
| 637779 | 2015 NK_{19} | — | August 25, 2005 | Palomar | NEAT | · | 2.2 km | MPC · JPL |
| 637780 | 2015 NN_{19} | — | June 19, 2006 | Mount Lemmon | Mount Lemmon Survey | · | 2.2 km | MPC · JPL |
| 637781 | 2015 ND_{20} | — | December 31, 2007 | Kitt Peak | Spacewatch | HYG | 3.1 km | MPC · JPL |
| 637782 | 2015 NV_{20} | — | November 14, 2012 | Kitt Peak | Spacewatch | · | 1.9 km | MPC · JPL |
| 637783 | 2015 NK_{22} | — | February 17, 2007 | Kitt Peak | Spacewatch | · | 1.3 km | MPC · JPL |
| 637784 | 2015 NL_{22} | — | August 29, 2006 | Kitt Peak | Spacewatch | · | 2.2 km | MPC · JPL |
| 637785 | 2015 NZ_{26} | — | January 16, 2009 | Kitt Peak | Spacewatch | · | 1.5 km | MPC · JPL |
| 637786 | 2015 OP_{1} | — | July 20, 2003 | Palomar | NEAT | · | 1.8 km | MPC · JPL |
| 637787 | 2015 OX_{2} | — | October 22, 2008 | Kitt Peak | Spacewatch | · | 1.3 km | MPC · JPL |
| 637788 | 2015 OP_{5} | — | May 1, 2003 | Kitt Peak | Spacewatch | · | 3.5 km | MPC · JPL |
| 637789 | 2015 OP_{6} | — | April 4, 2003 | Kitt Peak | Spacewatch | EOS | 1.9 km | MPC · JPL |
| 637790 | 2015 OS_{16} | — | November 3, 2008 | Mount Lemmon | Mount Lemmon Survey | · | 1.2 km | MPC · JPL |
| 637791 | 2015 OE_{18} | — | November 7, 2002 | Kitt Peak | Deep Ecliptic Survey | AGN | 1.2 km | MPC · JPL |
| 637792 | 2015 OQ_{20} | — | November 8, 2009 | Kitt Peak | Spacewatch | · | 940 m | MPC · JPL |
| 637793 | 2015 OB_{23} | — | February 2, 2006 | Kitt Peak | Spacewatch | · | 1.5 km | MPC · JPL |
| 637794 | 2015 OO_{23} | — | August 5, 2003 | Kitt Peak | Spacewatch | · | 1.1 km | MPC · JPL |
| 637795 | 2015 OH_{24} | — | August 26, 2000 | Socorro | LINEAR | · | 1.2 km | MPC · JPL |
| 637796 | 2015 OE_{26} | — | February 6, 2002 | Kitt Peak | Deep Ecliptic Survey | · | 1.5 km | MPC · JPL |
| 637797 | 2015 OF_{28} | — | July 31, 2011 | Haleakala | Pan-STARRS 1 | · | 1.1 km | MPC · JPL |
| 637798 | 2015 OZ_{30} | — | October 21, 2006 | Lulin | LUSS | KOR | 1.4 km | MPC · JPL |
| 637799 | 2015 OE_{31} | — | September 19, 2003 | Palomar | NEAT | · | 1.1 km | MPC · JPL |
| 637800 | 2015 OU_{32} | — | May 30, 2015 | Haleakala | Pan-STARRS 1 | · | 3.1 km | MPC · JPL |

== 637801–637900 ==
back to top

| Designation | | | Discovery | | | Properties | | Ref |
| Permanent | Provisional | Named after | Date | Site | Discoverer(s) | Category | Diam. | Ref |
|---|---|---|---|---|---|---|---|---|
| 637801 | 2015 OC_{33} | — | April 29, 2014 | Mount Lemmon | Mount Lemmon Survey | · | 1.5 km | MPC · JPL |
| 637802 | 2015 OK_{36} | — | May 3, 2003 | Kitt Peak | Spacewatch | NYS | 1.2 km | MPC · JPL |
| 637803 | 2015 OM_{38} | — | March 25, 2003 | Palomar | NEAT | · | 2.4 km | MPC · JPL |
| 637804 | 2015 OO_{38} | — | March 19, 2009 | Kitt Peak | Spacewatch | · | 1.8 km | MPC · JPL |
| 637805 | 2015 OJ_{42} | — | June 27, 2015 | Haleakala | Pan-STARRS 1 | · | 1.4 km | MPC · JPL |
| 637806 | 2015 OG_{45} | — | September 8, 2011 | Haleakala | Pan-STARRS 1 | GEF | 1.7 km | MPC · JPL |
| 637807 | 2015 OC_{49} | — | November 25, 2006 | Kitt Peak | Spacewatch | · | 3.5 km | MPC · JPL |
| 637808 | 2015 OB_{52} | — | October 26, 2011 | Haleakala | Pan-STARRS 1 | · | 2.3 km | MPC · JPL |
| 637809 | 2015 OZ_{64} | — | March 10, 2007 | Catalina | CSS | · | 3.5 km | MPC · JPL |
| 637810 | 2015 OF_{67} | — | February 17, 2001 | Nogales | P. R. Holvorcem, M. Schwartz | · | 1.9 km | MPC · JPL |
| 637811 | 2015 OO_{68} | — | September 11, 2004 | Kitt Peak | Spacewatch | NYS | 1.3 km | MPC · JPL |
| 637812 | 2015 OA_{69} | — | September 11, 2005 | Kitt Peak | Spacewatch | · | 2.0 km | MPC · JPL |
| 637813 | 2015 OQ_{69} | — | January 2, 2006 | Mount Lemmon | Mount Lemmon Survey | · | 1.3 km | MPC · JPL |
| 637814 | 2015 OQ_{70} | — | September 23, 2008 | Mount Lemmon | Mount Lemmon Survey | · | 1.5 km | MPC · JPL |
| 637815 | 2015 OS_{70} | — | December 31, 2013 | Kitt Peak | Spacewatch | · | 780 m | MPC · JPL |
| 637816 | 2015 OO_{77} | — | November 7, 2007 | Catalina | CSS | · | 1.5 km | MPC · JPL |
| 637817 | 2015 OM_{78} | — | December 3, 2005 | Mauna Kea | A. Boattini | MAS | 780 m | MPC · JPL |
| 637818 | 2015 OA_{85} | — | May 13, 2005 | Siding Spring | SSS | · | 2.3 km | MPC · JPL |
| 637819 | 2015 OT_{86} | — | April 9, 2010 | Kitt Peak | Spacewatch | · | 1.0 km | MPC · JPL |
| 637820 | 2015 OZ_{86} | — | September 4, 2011 | Haleakala | Pan-STARRS 1 | · | 960 m | MPC · JPL |
| 637821 | 2015 OP_{87} | — | November 12, 2007 | Mount Lemmon | Mount Lemmon Survey | · | 1.2 km | MPC · JPL |
| 637822 | 2015 OV_{87} | — | August 30, 2000 | Kitt Peak | Spacewatch | V | 600 m | MPC · JPL |
| 637823 | 2015 OE_{90} | — | January 10, 2013 | Haleakala | Pan-STARRS 1 | AGN | 1.3 km | MPC · JPL |
| 637824 | 2015 OT_{90} | — | September 19, 2011 | Haleakala | Pan-STARRS 1 | · | 1.6 km | MPC · JPL |
| 637825 | 2015 OZ_{90} | — | September 19, 2007 | Kitt Peak | Spacewatch | · | 1.1 km | MPC · JPL |
| 637826 | 2015 OB_{91} | — | October 27, 2008 | Mount Lemmon | Mount Lemmon Survey | · | 1.4 km | MPC · JPL |
| 637827 | 2015 OY_{94} | — | May 23, 2014 | Haleakala | Pan-STARRS 1 | · | 2.1 km | MPC · JPL |
| 637828 | 2015 OE_{95} | — | October 4, 2002 | Socorro | LINEAR | · | 1.9 km | MPC · JPL |
| 637829 | 2015 OE_{100} | — | October 24, 2011 | Haleakala | Pan-STARRS 1 | · | 1.5 km | MPC · JPL |
| 637830 | 2015 OQ_{102} | — | July 25, 2015 | Haleakala | Pan-STARRS 1 | · | 1.5 km | MPC · JPL |
| 637831 | 2015 OH_{105} | — | October 11, 2007 | Mount Lemmon | Mount Lemmon Survey | · | 940 m | MPC · JPL |
| 637832 | 2015 OQ_{128} | — | July 19, 2015 | Haleakala | Pan-STARRS 1 | MAR | 800 m | MPC · JPL |
| 637833 | 2015 OX_{172} | — | July 24, 2015 | Haleakala | Pan-STARRS 1 | · | 630 m | MPC · JPL |
| 637834 | 2015 PV_{3} | — | September 20, 2003 | Palomar | NEAT | · | 1.2 km | MPC · JPL |
| 637835 | 2015 PC_{6} | — | July 28, 2015 | Haleakala | Pan-STARRS 1 | · | 1.0 km | MPC · JPL |
| 637836 | 2015 PF_{7} | — | March 18, 2015 | Haleakala | Pan-STARRS 1 | PHO | 960 m | MPC · JPL |
| 637837 | 2015 PV_{8} | — | July 20, 2007 | Lulin | LUSS | · | 1.2 km | MPC · JPL |
| 637838 | 2015 PY_{9} | — | December 6, 2008 | Kitt Peak | Spacewatch | · | 1.4 km | MPC · JPL |
| 637839 | 2015 PR_{15} | — | August 8, 2015 | Haleakala | Pan-STARRS 1 | · | 1.3 km | MPC · JPL |
| 637840 | 2015 PF_{18} | — | September 7, 2011 | Kitt Peak | Spacewatch | AGN | 1.1 km | MPC · JPL |
| 637841 | 2015 PT_{21} | — | November 17, 2001 | Haleakala | NEAT | · | 960 m | MPC · JPL |
| 637842 | 2015 PU_{21} | — | February 24, 2014 | Haleakala | Pan-STARRS 1 | V | 580 m | MPC · JPL |
| 637843 | 2015 PJ_{28} | — | September 17, 2010 | Mount Lemmon | Mount Lemmon Survey | VER | 2.3 km | MPC · JPL |
| 637844 | 2015 PL_{35} | — | January 29, 2009 | Mount Lemmon | Mount Lemmon Survey | · | 1.7 km | MPC · JPL |
| 637845 | 2015 PT_{35} | — | September 15, 2004 | Kitt Peak | Spacewatch | · | 1.2 km | MPC · JPL |
| 637846 | 2015 PY_{35} | — | August 17, 2006 | Palomar | NEAT | · | 2.0 km | MPC · JPL |
| 637847 | 2015 PM_{36} | — | November 14, 2007 | Mount Lemmon | Mount Lemmon Survey | · | 2.2 km | MPC · JPL |
| 637848 | 2015 PF_{39} | — | February 22, 2014 | Mount Lemmon | Mount Lemmon Survey | · | 1.1 km | MPC · JPL |
| 637849 | 2015 PD_{45} | — | August 24, 2011 | Haleakala | Pan-STARRS 1 | · | 1.0 km | MPC · JPL |
| 637850 | 2015 PC_{47} | — | September 21, 1995 | Kitt Peak | Spacewatch | · | 860 m | MPC · JPL |
| 637851 | 2015 PG_{51} | — | April 12, 2002 | Palomar | NEAT | · | 1.4 km | MPC · JPL |
| 637852 | 2015 PH_{53} | — | August 9, 2015 | Haleakala | Pan-STARRS 1 | · | 1.5 km | MPC · JPL |
| 637853 | 2015 PW_{55} | — | August 9, 2015 | Haleakala | Pan-STARRS 1 | · | 1.1 km | MPC · JPL |
| 637854 | 2015 PP_{59} | — | April 7, 2000 | Kitt Peak | Spacewatch | ERI | 1.5 km | MPC · JPL |
| 637855 | 2015 PH_{62} | — | June 1, 2006 | Kitt Peak | Spacewatch | · | 2.3 km | MPC · JPL |
| 637856 | 2015 PR_{67} | — | November 21, 2008 | Kitt Peak | Spacewatch | · | 1.3 km | MPC · JPL |
| 637857 | 2015 PR_{69} | — | December 30, 2013 | Mount Lemmon | Mount Lemmon Survey | NYS | 1.1 km | MPC · JPL |
| 637858 | 2015 PD_{72} | — | January 10, 2007 | Kitt Peak | Spacewatch | · | 890 m | MPC · JPL |
| 637859 | 2015 PE_{74} | — | November 14, 2007 | Kitt Peak | Spacewatch | (12739) | 1.4 km | MPC · JPL |
| 637860 | 2015 PK_{88} | — | February 16, 2013 | Mount Lemmon | Mount Lemmon Survey | · | 2.6 km | MPC · JPL |
| 637861 | 2015 PQ_{88} | — | September 20, 2007 | Kitt Peak | Spacewatch | · | 1.3 km | MPC · JPL |
| 637862 | 2015 PB_{91} | — | July 14, 2015 | Haleakala | Pan-STARRS 1 | · | 710 m | MPC · JPL |
| 637863 | 2015 PS_{109} | — | August 4, 2011 | Haleakala | Pan-STARRS 1 | · | 820 m | MPC · JPL |
| 637864 | 2015 PY_{111} | — | March 11, 2007 | Kitt Peak | Spacewatch | · | 980 m | MPC · JPL |
| 637865 | 2015 PN_{112} | — | August 28, 2006 | Kitt Peak | Spacewatch | · | 1.9 km | MPC · JPL |
| 637866 | 2015 PS_{113} | — | September 17, 2006 | Kitt Peak | Spacewatch | KOR | 1.1 km | MPC · JPL |
| 637867 | 2015 PE_{119} | — | March 15, 2007 | Kitt Peak | Spacewatch | · | 730 m | MPC · JPL |
| 637868 | 2015 PD_{131} | — | December 29, 2003 | Kitt Peak | Spacewatch | · | 2.5 km | MPC · JPL |
| 637869 | 2015 PE_{134} | — | July 29, 2000 | Cerro Tololo | Deep Ecliptic Survey | KOR | 1.4 km | MPC · JPL |
| 637870 | 2015 PO_{137} | — | June 17, 2015 | Haleakala | Pan-STARRS 1 | · | 980 m | MPC · JPL |
| 637871 | 2015 PL_{144} | — | August 10, 2015 | Haleakala | Pan-STARRS 1 | V | 470 m | MPC · JPL |
| 637872 | 2015 PJ_{146} | — | April 22, 2007 | Kitt Peak | Spacewatch | · | 1.1 km | MPC · JPL |
| 637873 | 2015 PJ_{151} | — | November 4, 2004 | Kitt Peak | Spacewatch | · | 990 m | MPC · JPL |
| 637874 | 2015 PV_{152} | — | July 12, 2015 | Haleakala | Pan-STARRS 1 | · | 1.1 km | MPC · JPL |
| 637875 | 2015 PS_{166} | — | December 20, 2006 | Mount Lemmon | Mount Lemmon Survey | · | 2.9 km | MPC · JPL |
| 637876 | 2015 PC_{171} | — | December 23, 2012 | Haleakala | Pan-STARRS 1 | · | 1.5 km | MPC · JPL |
| 637877 | 2015 PR_{171} | — | March 3, 2006 | Mount Lemmon | Mount Lemmon Survey | · | 1.1 km | MPC · JPL |
| 637878 | 2015 PJ_{172} | — | February 28, 2014 | Haleakala | Pan-STARRS 1 | · | 930 m | MPC · JPL |
| 637879 | 2015 PV_{175} | — | November 26, 2012 | Mount Lemmon | Mount Lemmon Survey | · | 1.0 km | MPC · JPL |
| 637880 | 2015 PC_{182} | — | July 12, 2015 | Haleakala | Pan-STARRS 1 | · | 950 m | MPC · JPL |
| 637881 | 2015 PD_{183} | — | November 20, 2008 | Kitt Peak | Spacewatch | (5) | 1.2 km | MPC · JPL |
| 637882 | 2015 PF_{184} | — | December 4, 2007 | Mount Lemmon | Mount Lemmon Survey | · | 1.5 km | MPC · JPL |
| 637883 | 2015 PY_{185} | — | August 10, 2015 | Haleakala | Pan-STARRS 1 | · | 1.4 km | MPC · JPL |
| 637884 | 2015 PU_{186} | — | August 17, 1995 | Kitt Peak | Spacewatch | · | 1.0 km | MPC · JPL |
| 637885 | 2015 PX_{205} | — | October 13, 2007 | Mount Lemmon | Mount Lemmon Survey | · | 970 m | MPC · JPL |
| 637886 | 2015 PB_{215} | — | May 19, 2006 | Mount Lemmon | Mount Lemmon Survey | EUN | 930 m | MPC · JPL |
| 637887 | 2015 PM_{229} | — | August 27, 2000 | Cerro Tololo | Deep Ecliptic Survey | · | 1.3 km | MPC · JPL |
| 637888 | 2015 PL_{231} | — | January 16, 2005 | Kitt Peak | Spacewatch | MAR | 980 m | MPC · JPL |
| 637889 | 2015 PO_{231} | — | September 30, 2003 | Kitt Peak | Spacewatch | · | 990 m | MPC · JPL |
| 637890 | 2015 PR_{245} | — | July 12, 2015 | Haleakala | Pan-STARRS 1 | KOR | 1.2 km | MPC · JPL |
| 637891 | 2015 PT_{246} | — | November 9, 2008 | Kitt Peak | Spacewatch | · | 900 m | MPC · JPL |
| 637892 | 2015 PD_{247} | — | August 10, 2015 | Haleakala | Pan-STARRS 1 | · | 1.7 km | MPC · JPL |
| 637893 | 2015 PP_{258} | — | September 28, 2008 | Mount Lemmon | Mount Lemmon Survey | NYS | 910 m | MPC · JPL |
| 637894 | 2015 PQ_{258} | — | December 27, 2011 | Mount Lemmon | Mount Lemmon Survey | · | 3.8 km | MPC · JPL |
| 637895 | 2015 PY_{258} | — | March 26, 2003 | Palomar | NEAT | · | 1.1 km | MPC · JPL |
| 637896 | 2015 PS_{270} | — | October 19, 1995 | Kitt Peak | Spacewatch | · | 1.1 km | MPC · JPL |
| 637897 | 2015 PY_{273} | — | December 16, 2007 | Kitt Peak | Spacewatch | · | 2.0 km | MPC · JPL |
| 637898 | 2015 PL_{283} | — | November 2, 2008 | Mount Lemmon | Mount Lemmon Survey | · | 1.7 km | MPC · JPL |
| 637899 | 2015 PZ_{289} | — | August 12, 2015 | Haleakala | Pan-STARRS 1 | PHO | 860 m | MPC · JPL |
| 637900 | 2015 PD_{291} | — | April 28, 2014 | Kitt Peak | Spacewatch | · | 1.2 km | MPC · JPL |

== 637901–638000 ==
back to top

| Designation | | | Discovery | | | Properties | | Ref |
| Permanent | Provisional | Named after | Date | Site | Discoverer(s) | Category | Diam. | Ref |
|---|---|---|---|---|---|---|---|---|
| 637901 | 2015 PR_{292} | — | August 26, 2005 | Palomar | NEAT | · | 2.8 km | MPC · JPL |
| 637902 | 2015 PS_{301} | — | December 23, 2012 | Haleakala | Pan-STARRS 1 | · | 1.2 km | MPC · JPL |
| 637903 | 2015 PS_{303} | — | April 5, 2008 | Kitt Peak | Spacewatch | · | 3.4 km | MPC · JPL |
| 637904 | 2015 PC_{306} | — | September 19, 1995 | Kitt Peak | Spacewatch | · | 950 m | MPC · JPL |
| 637905 | 2015 PC_{310} | — | January 5, 2013 | Kitt Peak | Spacewatch | NYS | 1.3 km | MPC · JPL |
| 637906 | 2015 PQ_{315} | — | September 1, 1998 | Kitt Peak | Spacewatch | · | 1.4 km | MPC · JPL |
| 637907 | 2015 PH_{316} | — | October 23, 2008 | Kitt Peak | Spacewatch | · | 1 km | MPC · JPL |
| 637908 | 2015 PQ_{316} | — | October 13, 2007 | Mount Lemmon | Mount Lemmon Survey | · | 1.3 km | MPC · JPL |
| 637909 | 2015 PW_{318} | — | May 1, 2014 | ESA OGS | ESA OGS | AGN | 1.2 km | MPC · JPL |
| 637910 | 2015 PQ_{320} | — | August 12, 2015 | Haleakala | Pan-STARRS 1 | · | 2.0 km | MPC · JPL |
| 637911 | 2015 PD_{323} | — | August 14, 2015 | Haleakala | Pan-STARRS 1 | · | 930 m | MPC · JPL |
| 637912 | 2015 QZ_{5} | — | July 26, 2015 | Haleakala | Pan-STARRS 1 | · | 1.3 km | MPC · JPL |
| 637913 | 2015 QO_{6} | — | December 30, 2013 | Mount Lemmon | Mount Lemmon Survey | · | 1.4 km | MPC · JPL |
| 637914 | 2015 QJ_{11} | — | January 11, 2008 | Mount Lemmon | Mount Lemmon Survey | (5) | 1.3 km | MPC · JPL |
| 637915 | 2015 QQ_{12} | — | September 21, 2011 | Catalina | CSS | · | 1.3 km | MPC · JPL |
| 637916 | 2015 QA_{15} | — | October 17, 2003 | Kitt Peak | Spacewatch | · | 1.4 km | MPC · JPL |
| 637917 | 2015 QC_{15} | — | June 24, 2014 | Haleakala | Pan-STARRS 1 | · | 1.9 km | MPC · JPL |
| 637918 | 2015 QL_{18} | — | October 23, 2011 | Haleakala | Pan-STARRS 1 | · | 1.2 km | MPC · JPL |
| 637919 | 2015 QQ_{36} | — | April 5, 2008 | Mount Lemmon | Mount Lemmon Survey | · | 1.5 km | MPC · JPL |
| 637920 | 2015 RH | — | September 21, 2011 | Mount Lemmon | Mount Lemmon Survey | · | 1.3 km | MPC · JPL |
| 637921 | 2015 RS_{3} | — | October 6, 2008 | Mount Lemmon | Mount Lemmon Survey | V | 590 m | MPC · JPL |
| 637922 | 2015 RV_{7} | — | December 13, 1996 | Kitt Peak | Spacewatch | · | 1.2 km | MPC · JPL |
| 637923 | 2015 RS_{8} | — | April 26, 2003 | Kitt Peak | Spacewatch | · | 1.3 km | MPC · JPL |
| 637924 | 2015 RW_{9} | — | July 6, 2005 | Kitt Peak | Spacewatch | KOR | 1.3 km | MPC · JPL |
| 637925 | 2015 RX_{10} | — | April 10, 2010 | Mount Lemmon | Mount Lemmon Survey | · | 1.3 km | MPC · JPL |
| 637926 | 2015 RV_{11} | — | August 10, 2010 | Kitt Peak | Spacewatch | · | 1.6 km | MPC · JPL |
| 637927 | 2015 RW_{12} | — | November 20, 2004 | Kitt Peak | Spacewatch | · | 1.1 km | MPC · JPL |
| 637928 | 2015 RM_{15} | — | June 4, 2006 | Mount Lemmon | Mount Lemmon Survey | · | 1.3 km | MPC · JPL |
| 637929 | 2015 RB_{18} | — | July 6, 2003 | Kitt Peak | Spacewatch | · | 1.4 km | MPC · JPL |
| 637930 | 2015 RF_{21} | — | February 2, 1997 | Kitt Peak | Spacewatch | (5) | 1.2 km | MPC · JPL |
| 637931 | 2015 RZ_{21} | — | August 21, 2015 | Haleakala | Pan-STARRS 1 | · | 1.1 km | MPC · JPL |
| 637932 | 2015 RO_{26} | — | November 19, 2008 | Mount Lemmon | Mount Lemmon Survey | · | 1.3 km | MPC · JPL |
| 637933 | 2015 RJ_{28} | — | April 5, 2014 | Haleakala | Pan-STARRS 1 | · | 1.3 km | MPC · JPL |
| 637934 | 2015 RL_{29} | — | January 30, 2006 | Kitt Peak | Spacewatch | NYS | 1.2 km | MPC · JPL |
| 637935 | 2015 RO_{30} | — | August 11, 2002 | Palomar | NEAT | · | 680 m | MPC · JPL |
| 637936 | 2015 RX_{30} | — | October 31, 2011 | Mayhill-ISON | L. Elenin | · | 1.5 km | MPC · JPL |
| 637937 | 2015 RG_{32} | — | June 18, 2010 | Mount Lemmon | Mount Lemmon Survey | · | 1.6 km | MPC · JPL |
| 637938 | 2015 RE_{33} | — | September 24, 2011 | Haleakala | Pan-STARRS 1 | MAR | 860 m | MPC · JPL |
| 637939 | 2015 RO_{38} | — | October 2, 2003 | Kitt Peak | Spacewatch | · | 1.3 km | MPC · JPL |
| 637940 | 2015 RF_{39} | — | August 20, 2006 | Palomar | NEAT | · | 1.6 km | MPC · JPL |
| 637941 | 2015 RQ_{39} | — | September 13, 2007 | Mount Lemmon | Mount Lemmon Survey | · | 780 m | MPC · JPL |
| 637942 | 2015 RQ_{42} | — | February 28, 2014 | Haleakala | Pan-STARRS 1 | MAS | 680 m | MPC · JPL |
| 637943 | 2015 RC_{43} | — | March 24, 2001 | Kitt Peak | Spacewatch | · | 1.1 km | MPC · JPL |
| 637944 | 2015 RD_{45} | — | March 13, 2007 | Kitt Peak | Spacewatch | · | 3.4 km | MPC · JPL |
| 637945 | 2015 RL_{47} | — | September 8, 2000 | Kitt Peak | Spacewatch | NYS | 1.0 km | MPC · JPL |
| 637946 | 2015 RM_{49} | — | February 3, 1997 | Kitt Peak | Spacewatch | · | 810 m | MPC · JPL |
| 637947 | 2015 RL_{53} | — | April 14, 2010 | Kitt Peak | Spacewatch | · | 830 m | MPC · JPL |
| 637948 | 2015 RK_{56} | — | October 10, 2007 | Mount Lemmon | Mount Lemmon Survey | · | 870 m | MPC · JPL |
| 637949 | 2015 RH_{59} | — | January 18, 2004 | Palomar | NEAT | · | 1.7 km | MPC · JPL |
| 637950 | 2015 RD_{61} | — | January 27, 2007 | Mount Lemmon | Mount Lemmon Survey | · | 720 m | MPC · JPL |
| 637951 | 2015 RX_{61} | — | March 15, 2010 | Kitt Peak | Spacewatch | · | 1.5 km | MPC · JPL |
| 637952 | 2015 RS_{62} | — | January 17, 2007 | Kitt Peak | Spacewatch | · | 2.1 km | MPC · JPL |
| 637953 | 2015 RQ_{65} | — | February 5, 2010 | Kitt Peak | Spacewatch | · | 1.1 km | MPC · JPL |
| 637954 | 2015 RE_{67} | — | July 16, 2004 | Cerro Tololo | Deep Ecliptic Survey | · | 2.3 km | MPC · JPL |
| 637955 | 2015 RK_{68} | — | September 22, 2004 | Kitt Peak | Spacewatch | · | 2.5 km | MPC · JPL |
| 637956 | 2015 RN_{76} | — | March 6, 2013 | Haleakala | Pan-STARRS 1 | EUN | 810 m | MPC · JPL |
| 637957 | 2015 RV_{79} | — | September 24, 2011 | Mount Lemmon | Mount Lemmon Survey | · | 900 m | MPC · JPL |
| 637958 | 2015 RQ_{87} | — | December 28, 2008 | Saint-Sulpice | B. Christophe | V | 880 m | MPC · JPL |
| 637959 | 2015 RX_{87} | — | August 22, 2006 | Palomar | NEAT | JUN | 1.4 km | MPC · JPL |
| 637960 | 2015 RQ_{88} | — | October 10, 2015 | Catalina | CSS | · | 1.2 km | MPC · JPL |
| 637961 | 2015 RF_{92} | — | February 25, 2006 | Mount Lemmon | Mount Lemmon Survey | · | 1.0 km | MPC · JPL |
| 637962 | 2015 RU_{93} | — | September 28, 2001 | Palomar | NEAT | · | 2.1 km | MPC · JPL |
| 637963 | 2015 RJ_{94} | — | March 31, 2003 | Cerro Tololo | Deep Lens Survey | · | 1.3 km | MPC · JPL |
| 637964 | 2015 RS_{94} | — | September 19, 2003 | Palomar | NEAT | (5) | 1.1 km | MPC · JPL |
| 637965 | 2015 RL_{95} | — | July 23, 2015 | Haleakala | Pan-STARRS 1 | · | 960 m | MPC · JPL |
| 637966 | 2015 RA_{97} | — | December 31, 2008 | Kitt Peak | Spacewatch | NYS | 1.2 km | MPC · JPL |
| 637967 | 2015 RL_{97} | — | September 9, 2007 | Kitt Peak | Spacewatch | · | 1.3 km | MPC · JPL |
| 637968 | 2015 RW_{97} | — | July 23, 2015 | Haleakala | Pan-STARRS 1 | MAS | 720 m | MPC · JPL |
| 637969 | 2015 RL_{99} | — | May 7, 2006 | Kitt Peak | Spacewatch | · | 2.0 km | MPC · JPL |
| 637970 | 2015 RU_{99} | — | July 24, 2003 | Palomar | NEAT | · | 3.4 km | MPC · JPL |
| 637971 | 2015 RP_{100} | — | January 19, 2009 | BlackBird | Levin, K. | · | 1.3 km | MPC · JPL |
| 637972 | 2015 RO_{102} | — | October 15, 1998 | Kitt Peak | Spacewatch | MAR | 1.2 km | MPC · JPL |
| 637973 | 2015 RU_{102} | — | July 25, 2001 | Haleakala | NEAT | · | 3.2 km | MPC · JPL |
| 637974 | 2015 RJ_{105} | — | March 18, 2010 | Mount Lemmon | Mount Lemmon Survey | · | 1.2 km | MPC · JPL |
| 637975 | 2015 RX_{106} | — | September 11, 2002 | Palomar | NEAT | · | 1.8 km | MPC · JPL |
| 637976 | 2015 RC_{111} | — | April 5, 2014 | Haleakala | Pan-STARRS 1 | · | 940 m | MPC · JPL |
| 637977 | 2015 RF_{111} | — | October 19, 2001 | Kitt Peak | Spacewatch | KOR | 1.5 km | MPC · JPL |
| 637978 | 2015 RV_{112} | — | January 16, 2009 | Kitt Peak | Spacewatch | · | 710 m | MPC · JPL |
| 637979 | 2015 RY_{116} | — | December 30, 2007 | Kitt Peak | Spacewatch | JUN | 1.3 km | MPC · JPL |
| 637980 | 2015 RF_{117} | — | June 2, 2002 | Kitt Peak | Spacewatch | · | 1.2 km | MPC · JPL |
| 637981 | 2015 RK_{117} | — | December 22, 2003 | Kitt Peak | Spacewatch | · | 1.6 km | MPC · JPL |
| 637982 | 2015 RN_{118} | — | April 18, 2007 | Kitt Peak | Spacewatch | · | 1.3 km | MPC · JPL |
| 637983 | 2015 RV_{118} | — | August 13, 2015 | Haleakala | Pan-STARRS 1 | NYS | 1.2 km | MPC · JPL |
| 637984 | 2015 RK_{120} | — | July 20, 2011 | Siding Spring | SSS | · | 1.5 km | MPC · JPL |
| 637985 | 2015 RF_{122} | — | October 10, 1999 | Socorro | LINEAR | · | 1.9 km | MPC · JPL |
| 637986 | 2015 RB_{131} | — | November 1, 2010 | Mount Lemmon | Mount Lemmon Survey | · | 2.2 km | MPC · JPL |
| 637987 | 2015 RO_{132} | — | January 11, 2014 | Mount Lemmon | Mount Lemmon Survey | · | 1.3 km | MPC · JPL |
| 637988 | 2015 RF_{133} | — | March 13, 2007 | Mount Lemmon | Mount Lemmon Survey | (1298) | 2.8 km | MPC · JPL |
| 637989 | 2015 RO_{133} | — | September 24, 2004 | Kitt Peak | Spacewatch | · | 1.0 km | MPC · JPL |
| 637990 | 2015 RQ_{136} | — | October 8, 2007 | Mount Lemmon | Mount Lemmon Survey | · | 860 m | MPC · JPL |
| 637991 | 2015 RG_{147} | — | March 31, 2008 | Kitt Peak | Spacewatch | · | 2.7 km | MPC · JPL |
| 637992 | 2015 RD_{153} | — | May 3, 2014 | Mount Lemmon | Mount Lemmon Survey | · | 990 m | MPC · JPL |
| 637993 | 2015 RV_{174} | — | August 21, 2006 | Kitt Peak | Spacewatch | · | 1.5 km | MPC · JPL |
| 637994 | 2015 RL_{185} | — | November 18, 2007 | Mount Lemmon | Mount Lemmon Survey | · | 1.1 km | MPC · JPL |
| 637995 | 2015 RC_{186} | — | September 2, 2010 | Mount Lemmon | Mount Lemmon Survey | · | 1.7 km | MPC · JPL |
| 637996 | 2015 RH_{191} | — | September 18, 2006 | Kitt Peak | Spacewatch | · | 1.6 km | MPC · JPL |
| 637997 | 2015 RP_{191} | — | October 9, 2007 | Mount Lemmon | Mount Lemmon Survey | · | 680 m | MPC · JPL |
| 637998 | 2015 RY_{192} | — | February 27, 2006 | Mount Lemmon | Mount Lemmon Survey | · | 1.1 km | MPC · JPL |
| 637999 | 2015 RU_{194} | — | December 22, 2012 | Haleakala | Pan-STARRS 1 | · | 1.1 km | MPC · JPL |
| 638000 | 2015 RS_{195} | — | April 23, 2014 | Cerro Tololo-DECam | DECam | · | 1.1 km | MPC · JPL |

back to top
