= List of minor planets: 699001–700000 =

The following is a partial list of minor planets, running from minor-planet number 699001 through 700000, inclusive. The primary data for this and other partial lists is based on JPL's "Small-Body Orbital Elements" and data available from the Minor Planet Center. Critical list information is also provided by the MPC, unless otherwise specified from Lowell Observatory. A detailed description of the table's columns and additional sources are given on the main page including a complete list of every page in this series, and a statistical break-up on the dynamical classification of minor planets.

Also see the summary list of all named bodies in numerical and alphabetical order, and the corresponding naming citations for the number range of this particular list. New namings may only be added to this list after official publication, as the preannouncement of names is condemned by the Working Group for Small Bodies Nomenclature of the International Astronomical Union.

Near-Earth obj.	MBA (inner)	MBA (outer)	Centaur
Mars-crosser	MBA (middle)	Jupiter trojan	Trans-Neptunian obj.
Unclassified

== 699001–699100 ==
Designation			Discovery			Properties		Ref
Permanent	Provisional	Named after	Date	Site	Discoverer(s)	Category	Diam.	Ref
699001	2019 FU_{25}	—	April 23, 2014	Cerro Tololo	DECam	·	1.2 km	MPC · JPL
699002	2019 FE_{27}	—	March 31, 2019	Mount Lemmon	Mount Lemmon Survey	·	1.6 km	MPC · JPL
699003	2019 FZ_{27}	—	March 29, 2019	Mount Lemmon	Mount Lemmon Survey	·	1.5 km	MPC · JPL
699004	2019 FD_{30}	—	May 10, 2015	Mount Lemmon	Mount Lemmon Survey	·	1.4 km	MPC · JPL
699005	2019 FM_{32}	—	March 29, 2019	Mount Lemmon	Mount Lemmon Survey	·	2.0 km	MPC · JPL
699006	2019 FN_{32}	—	March 29, 2019	Mount Lemmon	Mount Lemmon Survey	·	1.6 km	MPC · JPL
699007	2019 GZ_{1}	—	May 15, 2008	Mount Lemmon	Mount Lemmon Survey	L5	9.9 km	MPC · JPL
699008	2019 GB_{2}	—	September 9, 2010	Kitt Peak	Spacewatch	H	300 m	MPC · JPL
699009	2019 GH_{6}	—	December 10, 2014	Haleakala	Pan-STARRS 1	L5	9.0 km	MPC · JPL
699010	2019 GE_{9}	—	October 19, 2011	Kitt Peak	Spacewatch	·	2.0 km	MPC · JPL
699011	2019 GU_{9}	—	September 22, 2008	Kitt Peak	Spacewatch	3:2	3.6 km	MPC · JPL
699012	2019 GN_{10}	—	November 1, 2013	Kitt Peak	Spacewatch	·	1.1 km	MPC · JPL
699013	2019 GA_{11}	—	September 12, 2007	Mount Lemmon	Mount Lemmon Survey	·	1.4 km	MPC · JPL
699014	2019 GE_{11}	—	April 2, 2019	Haleakala	Pan-STARRS 1	·	2.0 km	MPC · JPL
699015	2019 GS_{11}	—	May 8, 2014	Haleakala	Pan-STARRS 1	·	1.3 km	MPC · JPL
699016	2019 GL_{12}	—	April 14, 2010	Kitt Peak	Spacewatch	·	1.5 km	MPC · JPL
699017	2019 GL_{16}	—	February 26, 2014	Haleakala	Pan-STARRS 1	HOF	1.8 km	MPC · JPL
699018	2019 GP_{16}	—	July 26, 2015	Haleakala	Pan-STARRS 1	·	1.7 km	MPC · JPL
699019	2019 GW_{16}	—	July 6, 2016	Haleakala	Pan-STARRS 1	(5)	980 m	MPC · JPL
699020	2019 GZ_{16}	—	July 28, 2011	Haleakala	Pan-STARRS 1	·	1.1 km	MPC · JPL
699021	2019 GU_{17}	—	November 19, 2017	Haleakala	Pan-STARRS 1	·	1.6 km	MPC · JPL
699022	2019 GY_{18}	—	January 15, 2015	Haleakala	Pan-STARRS 1	L5	9.1 km	MPC · JPL
699023	2019 GY_{21}	—	March 31, 2019	Mount Lemmon	Mount Lemmon Survey	H	280 m	MPC · JPL
699024	2019 GT_{23}	—	May 3, 2014	Mount Lemmon	Mount Lemmon Survey	EOS	1.3 km	MPC · JPL
699025	2019 GK_{25}	—	November 10, 2004	Kitt Peak	Spacewatch	·	2.4 km	MPC · JPL
699026	2019 GU_{26}	—	June 18, 2015	Haleakala	Pan-STARRS 1	·	1.3 km	MPC · JPL
699027	2019 GN_{29}	—	February 26, 2007	Mount Lemmon	Mount Lemmon Survey	·	3.1 km	MPC · JPL
699028	2019 GY_{31}	—	October 27, 2005	Kitt Peak	Spacewatch	EOS	1.5 km	MPC · JPL
699029	2019 GK_{33}	—	April 15, 2008	Mount Lemmon	Mount Lemmon Survey	·	1.9 km	MPC · JPL
699030	2019 GR_{33}	—	May 22, 2003	Kitt Peak	Spacewatch	·	1.9 km	MPC · JPL
699031	2019 GX_{33}	—	May 21, 2014	Haleakala	Pan-STARRS 1	·	1.7 km	MPC · JPL
699032	2019 GT_{36}	—	April 6, 2019	Haleakala	Pan-STARRS 1	·	2.0 km	MPC · JPL
699033	2019 GZ_{36}	—	March 8, 2008	Mount Lemmon	Mount Lemmon Survey	·	1.5 km	MPC · JPL
699034	2019 GJ_{38}	—	October 23, 2016	Mount Lemmon	Mount Lemmon Survey	EOS	1.5 km	MPC · JPL
699035	2019 GZ_{38}	—	March 8, 2005	Mount Lemmon	Mount Lemmon Survey	·	1.4 km	MPC · JPL
699036	2019 GB_{39}	—	April 3, 2019	Haleakala	Pan-STARRS 1	·	2.0 km	MPC · JPL
699037	2019 GP_{42}	—	May 8, 2014	Haleakala	Pan-STARRS 1	EOS	1.4 km	MPC · JPL
699038	2019 GF_{49}	—	April 5, 2019	Haleakala	Pan-STARRS 1	GEF	900 m	MPC · JPL
699039	2019 GP_{49}	—	April 4, 2019	Haleakala	Pan-STARRS 1	·	1.3 km	MPC · JPL
699040	2019 GQ_{49}	—	April 5, 2019	Haleakala	Pan-STARRS 1	·	2.2 km	MPC · JPL
699041	2019 GU_{49}	—	April 3, 2019	Haleakala	Pan-STARRS 1	AGN	880 m	MPC · JPL
699042	2019 GC_{50}	—	April 3, 2019	Haleakala	Pan-STARRS 1	·	1.3 km	MPC · JPL
699043	2019 GH_{50}	—	April 4, 2019	Mount Lemmon	Mount Lemmon Survey	BRA	1.1 km	MPC · JPL
699044	2019 GT_{50}	—	April 6, 2019	Haleakala	Pan-STARRS 1	·	1.7 km	MPC · JPL
699045	2019 GU_{50}	—	April 2, 2019	Haleakala	Pan-STARRS 1	·	2.2 km	MPC · JPL
699046	2019 GB_{51}	—	April 9, 2019	Haleakala	Pan-STARRS 1	·	1.7 km	MPC · JPL
699047	2019 GX_{51}	—	April 2, 2019	Haleakala	Pan-STARRS 1	·	2.1 km	MPC · JPL
699048	2019 GY_{51}	—	April 2, 2019	Haleakala	Pan-STARRS 1	·	2.3 km	MPC · JPL
699049	2019 GA_{52}	—	April 4, 2019	Mount Lemmon	Mount Lemmon Survey	EUP	3.1 km	MPC · JPL
699050	2019 GF_{52}	—	April 8, 2019	Haleakala	Pan-STARRS 1	TIR	1.9 km	MPC · JPL
699051	2019 GM_{52}	—	April 3, 2019	Haleakala	Pan-STARRS 1	·	1.4 km	MPC · JPL
699052	2019 GO_{52}	—	May 23, 2014	Haleakala	Pan-STARRS 1	·	1.3 km	MPC · JPL
699053	2019 GT_{52}	—	April 6, 2019	Haleakala	Pan-STARRS 1	·	2.5 km	MPC · JPL
699054	2019 GC_{53}	—	April 5, 2019	Haleakala	Pan-STARRS 1	EOS	1.4 km	MPC · JPL
699055	2019 GD_{53}	—	April 5, 2019	Haleakala	Pan-STARRS 1	·	1.6 km	MPC · JPL
699056	2019 GK_{53}	—	April 3, 2019	Haleakala	Pan-STARRS 1	·	1.4 km	MPC · JPL
699057	2019 GQ_{53}	—	April 4, 2019	Haleakala	Pan-STARRS 1	EOS	1.4 km	MPC · JPL
699058	2019 GB_{55}	—	April 3, 2019	Haleakala	Pan-STARRS 1	·	2.4 km	MPC · JPL
699059	2019 GG_{56}	—	April 5, 2019	Haleakala	Pan-STARRS 1	·	1.5 km	MPC · JPL
699060	2019 GK_{56}	—	April 6, 2019	Haleakala	Pan-STARRS 1	·	1.8 km	MPC · JPL
699061	2019 GR_{56}	—	April 2, 2019	Haleakala	Pan-STARRS 1	·	1.5 km	MPC · JPL
699062	2019 GV_{56}	—	April 3, 2019	Haleakala	Pan-STARRS 1	·	2.3 km	MPC · JPL
699063	2019 GJ_{57}	—	April 4, 2019	Haleakala	Pan-STARRS 1	·	1.5 km	MPC · JPL
699064	2019 GM_{57}	—	April 6, 2019	Haleakala	Pan-STARRS 1	·	2.8 km	MPC · JPL
699065	2019 GO_{57}	—	April 6, 2019	Haleakala	Pan-STARRS 1	·	2.3 km	MPC · JPL
699066	2019 GZ_{58}	—	April 25, 2014	Cerro Tololo	DECam	·	1.3 km	MPC · JPL
699067	2019 GR_{59}	—	April 28, 2014	Cerro Tololo	DECam	·	1.5 km	MPC · JPL
699068	2019 GP_{63}	—	October 19, 2012	Haleakala	Pan-STARRS 1	·	1.4 km	MPC · JPL
699069	2019 GA_{64}	—	April 3, 2019	Haleakala	Pan-STARRS 1	·	1.4 km	MPC · JPL
699070	2019 GU_{64}	—	April 7, 2019	Mount Lemmon	Mount Lemmon Survey	615	1 km	MPC · JPL
699071	2019 GS_{65}	—	April 5, 2019	Haleakala	Pan-STARRS 1	·	1.7 km	MPC · JPL
699072	2019 GA_{66}	—	April 5, 2019	Haleakala	Pan-STARRS 1	EOS	1.2 km	MPC · JPL
699073	2019 GJ_{66}	—	April 6, 2019	Haleakala	Pan-STARRS 1	·	2.4 km	MPC · JPL
699074	2019 GS_{66}	—	April 2, 2019	Kitt Peak	Spacewatch	·	1.6 km	MPC · JPL
699075	2019 GX_{66}	—	April 5, 2019	Haleakala	Pan-STARRS 1	·	2.1 km	MPC · JPL
699076	2019 GM_{69}	—	April 5, 2019	Haleakala	Pan-STARRS 1	·	2.5 km	MPC · JPL
699077	2019 GO_{69}	—	April 5, 2019	Haleakala	Pan-STARRS 1	·	1.5 km	MPC · JPL
699078	2019 GX_{69}	—	April 4, 2019	Haleakala	Pan-STARRS 1	·	2.1 km	MPC · JPL
699079	2019 GL_{70}	—	October 12, 2016	La Palma	Gaia Ground Based Optical Tracking	EOS	1.2 km	MPC · JPL
699080	2019 GB_{71}	—	April 2, 2019	Haleakala	Pan-STARRS 1	·	1.4 km	MPC · JPL
699081	2019 GL_{71}	—	April 3, 2019	Haleakala	Pan-STARRS 1	·	2.2 km	MPC · JPL
699082	2019 GN_{73}	—	April 5, 2019	Haleakala	Pan-STARRS 1	·	1.7 km	MPC · JPL
699083	2019 GL_{80}	—	April 9, 2019	Haleakala	Pan-STARRS 1	·	1.5 km	MPC · JPL
699084	2019 GE_{82}	—	April 3, 2019	Haleakala	Pan-STARRS 1	·	1.6 km	MPC · JPL
699085	2019 GO_{82}	—	April 4, 2019	Haleakala	Pan-STARRS 1	EOS	1.4 km	MPC · JPL
699086	2019 GS_{87}	—	April 8, 2019	Haleakala	Pan-STARRS 1	·	2.2 km	MPC · JPL
699087	2019 GZ_{90}	—	April 4, 2019	Haleakala	Pan-STARRS 1	·	2.6 km	MPC · JPL
699088	2019 GF_{91}	—	April 4, 2019	Haleakala	Pan-STARRS 1	·	2.4 km	MPC · JPL
699089	2019 GT_{91}	—	April 2, 2019	Haleakala	Pan-STARRS 1	·	1.6 km	MPC · JPL
699090	2019 GU_{93}	—	April 5, 2019	Haleakala	Pan-STARRS 1	·	1.8 km	MPC · JPL
699091	2019 GJ_{98}	—	April 5, 2019	Haleakala	Pan-STARRS 1	EOS	1.3 km	MPC · JPL
699092	2019 GO_{98}	—	April 2, 2019	Haleakala	Pan-STARRS 1	·	1.3 km	MPC · JPL
699093	2019 GB_{108}	—	April 3, 2019	Haleakala	Pan-STARRS 1	VER	2.0 km	MPC · JPL
699094	2019 GM_{108}	—	April 6, 2019	Haleakala	Pan-STARRS 1	·	2.4 km	MPC · JPL
699095	2019 GO_{110}	—	April 9, 2019	Haleakala	Pan-STARRS 1	BRA	990 m	MPC · JPL
699096	2019 GA_{112}	—	May 23, 2014	Haleakala	Pan-STARRS 1	·	1.4 km	MPC · JPL
699097	2019 GM_{112}	—	April 2, 2019	Haleakala	Pan-STARRS 1	KOR	1.1 km	MPC · JPL
699098	2019 GN_{112}	—	April 2, 2019	Haleakala	Pan-STARRS 1	·	2.1 km	MPC · JPL
699099	2019 GE_{113}	—	April 5, 2019	Haleakala	Pan-STARRS 1	GEF	950 m	MPC · JPL
699100	2019 GM_{113}	—	May 21, 2015	Cerro Tololo	DECam	·	1.2 km	MPC · JPL

== 699101–699200 ==
back to top

Designation			Discovery			Properties		Ref
Permanent	Provisional	Named after	Date	Site	Discoverer(s)	Category	Diam.	Ref
699101	2019 GC_{114}	—	April 3, 2019	Haleakala	Pan-STARRS 1	·	2.3 km	MPC · JPL
699102	2019 GO_{114}	—	April 4, 2019	Haleakala	Pan-STARRS 1	·	2.2 km	MPC · JPL
699103	2019 GH_{117}	—	August 29, 2006	Kitt Peak	Spacewatch	·	1.8 km	MPC · JPL
699104	2019 GO_{118}	—	April 2, 2019	Haleakala	Pan-STARRS 1	·	2.0 km	MPC · JPL
699105	2019 GR_{118}	—	April 4, 2019	Haleakala	Pan-STARRS 1	·	1.7 km	MPC · JPL
699106	2019 GT_{118}	—	April 3, 2019	Haleakala	Pan-STARRS 1	·	2.1 km	MPC · JPL
699107	2019 GW_{118}	—	April 3, 2019	Haleakala	Pan-STARRS 1	·	1.5 km	MPC · JPL
699108	2019 GK_{119}	—	April 3, 2019	Haleakala	Pan-STARRS 1	·	2.2 km	MPC · JPL
699109	2019 GO_{119}	—	April 5, 2019	Haleakala	Pan-STARRS 1	·	1.5 km	MPC · JPL
699110	2019 GB_{120}	—	September 27, 2016	Mount Lemmon	Mount Lemmon Survey	EOS	1.4 km	MPC · JPL
699111	2019 GM_{121}	—	April 7, 2019	Haleakala	Pan-STARRS 1	·	1.8 km	MPC · JPL
699112	2019 GN_{122}	—	April 2, 2019	Haleakala	Pan-STARRS 1	·	1.5 km	MPC · JPL
699113	2019 GU_{122}	—	May 20, 2015	Cerro Tololo	DECam	·	1.5 km	MPC · JPL
699114	2019 GW_{122}	—	April 2, 2019	Haleakala	Pan-STARRS 1	KOR	1.0 km	MPC · JPL
699115	2019 GD_{123}	—	March 31, 2019	Mount Lemmon	Mount Lemmon Survey	·	1.5 km	MPC · JPL
699116	2019 GF_{123}	—	October 8, 2007	Mount Lemmon	Mount Lemmon Survey	·	1.3 km	MPC · JPL
699117	2019 GN_{123}	—	April 3, 2019	Haleakala	Pan-STARRS 1	KOR	990 m	MPC · JPL
699118	2019 GO_{123}	—	April 3, 2019	Haleakala	Pan-STARRS 1	·	1.3 km	MPC · JPL
699119	2019 GN_{126}	—	April 10, 2014	Haleakala	Pan-STARRS 1	·	1.6 km	MPC · JPL
699120	2019 GG_{128}	—	April 2, 2019	Haleakala	Pan-STARRS 1	·	1.4 km	MPC · JPL
699121	2019 GK_{131}	—	April 7, 2019	Haleakala	Pan-STARRS 1	H	390 m	MPC · JPL
699122	2019 GV_{135}	—	April 5, 2019	Haleakala	Pan-STARRS 1	·	1.6 km	MPC · JPL
699123	2019 GB_{136}	—	April 3, 2019	Haleakala	Pan-STARRS 1	·	1.4 km	MPC · JPL
699124	2019 GF_{137}	—	April 4, 2019	Mount Lemmon	Mount Lemmon Survey	·	1.7 km	MPC · JPL
699125	2019 GB_{144}	—	April 4, 2019	Mount Lemmon	Mount Lemmon Survey	·	1.6 km	MPC · JPL
699126	2019 GJ_{156}	—	April 14, 2019	Cerro Paranal	Altmann, M., Prusti, T.	KOR	870 m	MPC · JPL
699127	2019 GH_{179}	—	April 9, 2019	Haleakala	Pan-STARRS 1	·	2.3 km	MPC · JPL
699128	2019 GA_{183}	—	April 9, 2019	Haleakala	Pan-STARRS 1	·	1.4 km	MPC · JPL
699129	2019 GP_{183}	—	April 3, 2019	Haleakala	Pan-STARRS 1	·	1.3 km	MPC · JPL
699130	2019 HX_{1}	—	March 4, 2014	Kitt Peak	Spacewatch	·	1.8 km	MPC · JPL
699131	2019 HX_{4}	—	May 6, 2006	Mount Lemmon	Mount Lemmon Survey	·	580 m	MPC · JPL
699132	2019 HF_{6}	—	March 10, 2008	Mount Lemmon	Mount Lemmon Survey	·	2.2 km	MPC · JPL
699133	2019 HH_{6}	—	April 25, 2019	Haleakala	Pan-STARRS 1	·	1.5 km	MPC · JPL
699134	2019 HO_{8}	—	April 26, 2019	Mount Lemmon	Mount Lemmon Survey	·	2.0 km	MPC · JPL
699135	2019 HT_{11}	—	April 26, 2019	Mount Lemmon	Mount Lemmon Survey	·	2.0 km	MPC · JPL
699136	2019 JL_{2}	—	September 30, 2001	Palomar	NEAT	H	450 m	MPC · JPL
699137	2019 JP_{4}	—	August 8, 2007	Socorro	LINEAR	·	1.8 km	MPC · JPL
699138	2019 JO_{8}	—	January 12, 2019	Haleakala	Pan-STARRS 1	·	1.8 km	MPC · JPL
699139	2019 JJ_{9}	—	February 9, 2013	Oukaïmeden	C. Rinner	·	1.7 km	MPC · JPL
699140	2019 JV_{11}	—	May 8, 2014	Kitt Peak	Spacewatch	·	1.3 km	MPC · JPL
699141	2019 JX_{13}	—	November 3, 2011	Kitt Peak	Spacewatch	EOS	1.3 km	MPC · JPL
699142	2019 JC_{15}	—	April 5, 2014	Haleakala	Pan-STARRS 1	·	1.3 km	MPC · JPL
699143	2019 JQ_{16}	—	October 26, 2011	Haleakala	Pan-STARRS 1	·	2.5 km	MPC · JPL
699144	2019 JF_{17}	—	April 10, 2010	Mount Lemmon	Mount Lemmon Survey	·	1.2 km	MPC · JPL
699145	2019 JL_{17}	—	March 7, 2018	Haleakala	Pan-STARRS 1	·	2.6 km	MPC · JPL
699146	2019 JO_{19}	—	May 27, 2014	Haleakala	Pan-STARRS 1	KOR	950 m	MPC · JPL
699147	2019 JP_{19}	—	August 10, 2010	Kitt Peak	Spacewatch	·	1.5 km	MPC · JPL
699148	2019 JU_{19}	—	May 4, 2014	Haleakala	Pan-STARRS 1	·	1.3 km	MPC · JPL
699149	2019 JE_{23}	—	January 15, 2018	Mount Lemmon	Mount Lemmon Survey	·	2.1 km	MPC · JPL
699150	2019 JA_{26}	—	November 6, 2016	Kitt Peak	Spacewatch	·	1.5 km	MPC · JPL
699151	2019 JS_{26}	—	September 25, 2016	Haleakala	Pan-STARRS 1	·	1.8 km	MPC · JPL
699152	2019 JB_{28}	—	November 6, 2016	Mount Lemmon	Mount Lemmon Survey	·	2.1 km	MPC · JPL
699153	2019 JA_{29}	—	May 8, 2014	Haleakala	Pan-STARRS 1	EOS	1.2 km	MPC · JPL
699154	2019 JT_{29}	—	March 11, 2008	Kitt Peak	Spacewatch	·	1.8 km	MPC · JPL
699155	2019 JW_{29}	—	October 28, 2010	Mount Lemmon	Mount Lemmon Survey	VER	2.0 km	MPC · JPL
699156	2019 JB_{32}	—	September 23, 2011	Haleakala	Pan-STARRS 1	KOR	1.0 km	MPC · JPL
699157	2019 JN_{32}	—	July 25, 2006	Palomar	NEAT	·	680 m	MPC · JPL
699158	2019 JQ_{32}	—	February 8, 2013	Nogales	M. Schwartz, P. R. Holvorcem	·	2.0 km	MPC · JPL
699159	2019 JX_{35}	—	August 21, 2015	Haleakala	Pan-STARRS 1	·	2.3 km	MPC · JPL
699160	2019 JL_{36}	—	July 3, 2005	Mount Lemmon	Mount Lemmon Survey	KOR	1.1 km	MPC · JPL
699161	2019 JK_{37}	—	February 13, 2013	Haleakala	Pan-STARRS 1	·	1.7 km	MPC · JPL
699162	2019 JL_{38}	—	April 4, 2019	Haleakala	Pan-STARRS 1	·	1.4 km	MPC · JPL
699163	2019 JR_{40}	—	May 2, 2006	Kitt Peak	Spacewatch	JUN	970 m	MPC · JPL
699164	2019 JB_{41}	—	August 12, 2015	Haleakala	Pan-STARRS 1	·	2.1 km	MPC · JPL
699165	2019 JC_{46}	—	May 3, 2019	Mount Lemmon	Mount Lemmon Survey	·	1.6 km	MPC · JPL
699166	2019 JN_{48}	—	May 1, 2019	Haleakala	Pan-STARRS 1	·	1.9 km	MPC · JPL
699167	2019 JC_{50}	—	May 1, 2019	Haleakala	Pan-STARRS 1	·	1.9 km	MPC · JPL
699168	2019 JF_{50}	—	September 12, 2010	Mauna Kea	P. A. Wiegert	·	1.5 km	MPC · JPL
699169	2019 JD_{51}	—	January 20, 2018	Haleakala	Pan-STARRS 1	·	2.1 km	MPC · JPL
699170	2019 JV_{51}	—	April 15, 2008	Mount Lemmon	Mount Lemmon Survey	EOS	1.4 km	MPC · JPL
699171	2019 JA_{52}	—	May 1, 2019	XuYi	PMO NEO Survey Program	TIR	2.2 km	MPC · JPL
699172	2019 JL_{52}	—	December 8, 2010	Mount Lemmon	Mount Lemmon Survey	·	3.2 km	MPC · JPL
699173	2019 JX_{56}	—	May 6, 2019	Haleakala	Pan-STARRS 1	·	1.8 km	MPC · JPL
699174	2019 JF_{57}	—	February 8, 2013	Haleakala	Pan-STARRS 1	·	1.1 km	MPC · JPL
699175	2019 JK_{61}	—	November 10, 2010	Mount Lemmon	Mount Lemmon Survey	·	2.2 km	MPC · JPL
699176	2019 JN_{61}	—	July 1, 2014	Mount Lemmon	Mount Lemmon Survey	EOS	1.4 km	MPC · JPL
699177	2019 JF_{62}	—	May 1, 2019	Haleakala	Pan-STARRS 1	·	2.3 km	MPC · JPL
699178	2019 JH_{62}	—	May 7, 2019	Haleakala	Pan-STARRS 1	EOS	1.3 km	MPC · JPL
699179	2019 JK_{62}	—	May 8, 2019	Haleakala	Pan-STARRS 1	EOS	1.4 km	MPC · JPL
699180	2019 JP_{62}	—	May 1, 2019	Haleakala	Pan-STARRS 1	TEL	1.1 km	MPC · JPL
699181	2019 JX_{62}	—	May 12, 2019	Haleakala	Pan-STARRS 1	·	2.2 km	MPC · JPL
699182	2019 JG_{63}	—	May 1, 2019	Haleakala	Pan-STARRS 1	·	2.2 km	MPC · JPL
699183	2019 JO_{63}	—	October 7, 2010	Mount Lemmon	Mount Lemmon Survey	EOS	1.4 km	MPC · JPL
699184	2019 JQ_{63}	—	May 12, 2019	Haleakala	Pan-STARRS 1	H	350 m	MPC · JPL
699185	2019 JV_{63}	—	May 1, 2019	Haleakala	Pan-STARRS 1	·	1.5 km	MPC · JPL
699186	2019 JW_{63}	—	May 8, 2019	Haleakala	Pan-STARRS 1	·	1.4 km	MPC · JPL
699187	2019 JQ_{64}	—	May 1, 2019	Haleakala	Pan-STARRS 1	·	2.3 km	MPC · JPL
699188	2019 JD_{65}	—	May 1, 2019	Haleakala	Pan-STARRS 1	·	1.8 km	MPC · JPL
699189	2019 JN_{65}	—	May 1, 2019	Haleakala	Pan-STARRS 1	·	2.2 km	MPC · JPL
699190	2019 JP_{65}	—	May 1, 2019	Haleakala	Pan-STARRS 1	·	2.3 km	MPC · JPL
699191	2019 JH_{66}	—	May 20, 2015	Cerro Tololo	DECam	·	910 m	MPC · JPL
699192	2019 JJ_{68}	—	September 12, 2015	Haleakala	Pan-STARRS 1	VER	1.6 km	MPC · JPL
699193	2019 JX_{68}	—	May 2, 2019	Haleakala	Pan-STARRS 1	EOS	1.3 km	MPC · JPL
699194	2019 JZ_{68}	—	May 7, 2019	Haleakala	Pan-STARRS 1	·	2.0 km	MPC · JPL
699195	2019 JA_{69}	—	May 8, 2019	Haleakala	Pan-STARRS 1	·	2.2 km	MPC · JPL
699196	2019 JF_{69}	—	May 9, 2019	Haleakala	Pan-STARRS 1	·	2.6 km	MPC · JPL
699197	2019 JM_{69}	—	May 1, 2019	Haleakala	Pan-STARRS 1	·	1.6 km	MPC · JPL
699198	2019 JN_{69}	—	May 1, 2019	Haleakala	Pan-STARRS 1	·	2.2 km	MPC · JPL
699199	2019 JO_{69}	—	May 2, 2019	Haleakala	Pan-STARRS 1	·	2.3 km	MPC · JPL
699200	2019 JG_{70}	—	May 7, 2019	Haleakala	Pan-STARRS 1	·	2.2 km	MPC · JPL

== 699201–699300 ==
back to top

Designation			Discovery			Properties		Ref
Permanent	Provisional	Named after	Date	Site	Discoverer(s)	Category	Diam.	Ref
699201	2019 JK_{70}	—	May 7, 2019	Haleakala	Pan-STARRS 1	·	2.1 km	MPC · JPL
699202	2019 JY_{71}	—	May 2, 2019	Haleakala	Pan-STARRS 1	EOS	1.4 km	MPC · JPL
699203	2019 JB_{72}	—	May 7, 2019	Haleakala	Pan-STARRS 1	·	2.3 km	MPC · JPL
699204	2019 JE_{72}	—	May 8, 2019	Haleakala	Pan-STARRS 1	·	1.9 km	MPC · JPL
699205	2019 JE_{73}	—	May 27, 2014	Haleakala	Pan-STARRS 1	·	1.5 km	MPC · JPL
699206	2019 JV_{73}	—	May 8, 2019	Haleakala	Pan-STARRS 1	·	1.8 km	MPC · JPL
699207	2019 JL_{74}	—	May 12, 2019	Haleakala	Pan-STARRS 1	·	1.5 km	MPC · JPL
699208	2019 JA_{75}	—	May 2, 2019	Haleakala	Pan-STARRS 1	EOS	1.6 km	MPC · JPL
699209	2019 JF_{76}	—	April 29, 2014	Haleakala	Pan-STARRS 1	·	1.3 km	MPC · JPL
699210	2019 JJ_{76}	—	May 7, 2019	Haleakala	Pan-STARRS 1	·	2.4 km	MPC · JPL
699211	2019 JW_{77}	—	May 7, 2019	Haleakala	Pan-STARRS 1	EOS	1.3 km	MPC · JPL
699212	2019 JR_{81}	—	May 1, 2019	Haleakala	Pan-STARRS 1	·	1.6 km	MPC · JPL
699213	2019 JG_{86}	—	May 12, 2019	Haleakala	Pan-STARRS 1	H	380 m	MPC · JPL
699214	2019 JO_{94}	—	May 1, 2019	Haleakala	Pan-STARRS 1	KOR	1.1 km	MPC · JPL
699215	2019 JL_{100}	—	May 1, 2019	Haleakala	Pan-STARRS 1	·	1.9 km	MPC · JPL
699216	2019 JS_{100}	—	May 8, 2019	Haleakala	Pan-STARRS 1	·	2.4 km	MPC · JPL
699217	2019 JB_{102}	—	July 25, 2015	Haleakala	Pan-STARRS 1	·	2.4 km	MPC · JPL
699218	2019 JH_{103}	—	May 2, 2019	Haleakala	Pan-STARRS 1	·	2.6 km	MPC · JPL
699219	2019 JV_{107}	—	April 5, 2014	Haleakala	Pan-STARRS 1	·	1.5 km	MPC · JPL
699220	2019 JE_{108}	—	May 8, 2019	Haleakala	Pan-STARRS 1	·	2.2 km	MPC · JPL
699221	2019 JF_{108}	—	May 8, 2019	Haleakala	Pan-STARRS 1	EOS	1.2 km	MPC · JPL
699222	2019 JG_{108}	—	May 9, 2019	Haleakala	Pan-STARRS 1	·	2.0 km	MPC · JPL
699223	2019 JN_{108}	—	May 7, 2019	Haleakala	Pan-STARRS 1	·	1.8 km	MPC · JPL
699224	2019 JX_{108}	—	May 8, 2019	Haleakala	Pan-STARRS 1	·	1.3 km	MPC · JPL
699225	2019 JB_{110}	—	May 1, 2019	Haleakala	Pan-STARRS 1	·	980 m	MPC · JPL
699226	2019 JC_{110}	—	April 23, 2014	Cerro Tololo	DECam	KOR	940 m	MPC · JPL
699227	2019 JZ_{110}	—	August 13, 2015	Kitt Peak	Spacewatch	·	1.8 km	MPC · JPL
699228	2019 JM_{113}	—	May 11, 2019	Haleakala	Pan-STARRS 1	·	2.1 km	MPC · JPL
699229	2019 JB_{114}	—	May 8, 2019	Haleakala	Pan-STARRS 1	EOS	1.2 km	MPC · JPL
699230	2019 JJ_{114}	—	December 9, 2016	Mount Lemmon	Mount Lemmon Survey	·	2.9 km	MPC · JPL
699231	2019 JO_{117}	—	March 16, 2007	Mount Lemmon	Mount Lemmon Survey	·	2.1 km	MPC · JPL
699232	2019 JT_{139}	—	March 27, 2008	Mount Lemmon	Mount Lemmon Survey	·	1.4 km	MPC · JPL
699233	2019 JV_{139}	—	May 9, 2019	Haleakala	Pan-STARRS 1	·	1.1 km	MPC · JPL
699234	2019 KQ_{6}	—	October 11, 2017	Mount Lemmon	Mount Lemmon Survey	H	420 m	MPC · JPL
699235	2019 KT_{9}	—	July 3, 2014	Haleakala	Pan-STARRS 1	·	2.1 km	MPC · JPL
699236	2019 KD_{12}	—	March 13, 2013	Haleakala	Pan-STARRS 1	·	2.0 km	MPC · JPL
699237	2019 KD_{13}	—	May 26, 2019	Mount Lemmon	Mount Lemmon Survey	·	2.8 km	MPC · JPL
699238	2019 KV_{13}	—	November 13, 2010	Mount Lemmon	Mount Lemmon Survey	·	2.3 km	MPC · JPL
699239	2019 KG_{14}	—	August 17, 2009	Kitt Peak	Spacewatch	EOS	1.5 km	MPC · JPL
699240	2019 KT_{14}	—	May 8, 2008	Kitt Peak	Spacewatch	·	1.9 km	MPC · JPL
699241	2019 KN_{18}	—	March 15, 2010	Mount Lemmon	Mount Lemmon Survey	·	1.4 km	MPC · JPL
699242	2019 KF_{19}	—	May 21, 2014	Haleakala	Pan-STARRS 1	·	1.7 km	MPC · JPL
699243	2019 KO_{19}	—	May 26, 2019	Haleakala	Pan-STARRS 1	·	1.5 km	MPC · JPL
699244	2019 KV_{19}	—	May 27, 2019	Haleakala	Pan-STARRS 1	·	1.8 km	MPC · JPL
699245	2019 KG_{20}	—	May 30, 2019	Haleakala	Pan-STARRS 2	TIR	1.8 km	MPC · JPL
699246	2019 KL_{20}	—	May 29, 2019	Haleakala	Pan-STARRS 1	VER	2.0 km	MPC · JPL
699247	2019 KX_{20}	—	May 26, 2019	Haleakala	Pan-STARRS 1	·	1.8 km	MPC · JPL
699248	2019 KL_{21}	—	May 27, 2019	Haleakala	Pan-STARRS 1	·	1.6 km	MPC · JPL
699249	2019 KM_{21}	—	May 29, 2019	Haleakala	Pan-STARRS 1	·	2.5 km	MPC · JPL
699250	2019 KR_{21}	—	May 26, 2019	Mount Lemmon	Mount Lemmon Survey	·	2.2 km	MPC · JPL
699251	2019 KC_{23}	—	May 30, 2019	Haleakala	Pan-STARRS 1	·	1.8 km	MPC · JPL
699252	2019 KE_{24}	—	May 26, 2019	Mount Lemmon	Mount Lemmon Survey	·	1.5 km	MPC · JPL
699253	2019 KG_{24}	—	May 27, 2019	Haleakala	Pan-STARRS 1	ARM	2.9 km	MPC · JPL
699254	2019 KN_{24}	—	July 26, 2010	WISE	WISE	·	2.3 km	MPC · JPL
699255	2019 KP_{24}	—	May 27, 2019	Haleakala	Pan-STARRS 1	·	1.5 km	MPC · JPL
699256	2019 KQ_{24}	—	May 30, 2019	Haleakala	Pan-STARRS 1	·	2.6 km	MPC · JPL
699257	2019 KV_{24}	—	May 4, 2019	Mount Lemmon	Mount Lemmon Survey	·	1.7 km	MPC · JPL
699258	2019 KW_{24}	—	May 27, 2019	Haleakala	Pan-STARRS 1	EOS	1.5 km	MPC · JPL
699259	2019 KY_{24}	—	May 30, 2019	Haleakala	Pan-STARRS 2	·	1.6 km	MPC · JPL
699260	2019 KZ_{24}	—	May 30, 2019	Haleakala	Pan-STARRS 1	·	2.3 km	MPC · JPL
699261	2019 KF_{25}	—	May 25, 2019	Haleakala	Pan-STARRS 1	EOS	1.6 km	MPC · JPL
699262	2019 KM_{25}	—	May 25, 2019	Haleakala	Pan-STARRS 1	·	2.4 km	MPC · JPL
699263	2019 KO_{25}	—	May 25, 2019	Haleakala	Pan-STARRS 1	·	1.6 km	MPC · JPL
699264	2019 KP_{25}	—	May 25, 2019	Haleakala	Pan-STARRS 1	VER	1.9 km	MPC · JPL
699265	2019 KT_{25}	—	May 27, 2019	Haleakala	Pan-STARRS 1	EOS	1.4 km	MPC · JPL
699266	2019 KV_{25}	—	May 30, 2019	Haleakala	Pan-STARRS 1	KOR	1.0 km	MPC · JPL
699267	2019 KR_{27}	—	May 25, 2019	Haleakala	Pan-STARRS 1	·	2.4 km	MPC · JPL
699268	2019 KW_{27}	—	May 29, 2019	Haleakala	Pan-STARRS 1	EOS	1.4 km	MPC · JPL
699269	2019 KY_{27}	—	May 30, 2019	Haleakala	Pan-STARRS 1	·	2.0 km	MPC · JPL
699270	2019 KX_{32}	—	May 31, 2019	Haleakala	Pan-STARRS 1	·	3.1 km	MPC · JPL
699271	2019 KN_{39}	—	May 29, 2019	Haleakala	Pan-STARRS 1	·	1.8 km	MPC · JPL
699272	2019 KB_{42}	—	May 26, 2019	Haleakala	Pan-STARRS 1	EOS	1.2 km	MPC · JPL
699273	2019 KC_{44}	—	August 14, 2015	Haleakala	Pan-STARRS 1	·	1.5 km	MPC · JPL
699274	2019 KC_{46}	—	May 30, 2019	Haleakala	Pan-STARRS 1	EOS	1.3 km	MPC · JPL
699275	2019 KL_{49}	—	May 25, 2019	Haleakala	Pan-STARRS 1	·	1.3 km	MPC · JPL
699276	2019 KT_{49}	—	May 27, 2019	Haleakala	Pan-STARRS 1	·	2.4 km	MPC · JPL
699277	2019 KW_{49}	—	May 31, 2019	Haleakala	Pan-STARRS 1	·	2.3 km	MPC · JPL
699278	2019 KF_{50}	—	May 27, 2019	Haleakala	Pan-STARRS 1	·	2.1 km	MPC · JPL
699279	2019 KF_{51}	—	May 31, 2019	Haleakala	Pan-STARRS 1	·	2.1 km	MPC · JPL
699280	2019 KJ_{51}	—	May 30, 2019	Haleakala	Pan-STARRS 1	·	2.3 km	MPC · JPL
699281	2019 KH_{53}	—	July 25, 2015	Haleakala	Pan-STARRS 1	·	2.1 km	MPC · JPL
699282	2019 KP_{55}	—	April 7, 2008	Kitt Peak	Spacewatch	·	1.9 km	MPC · JPL
699283	2019 KD_{57}	—	May 27, 2019	Haleakala	Pan-STARRS 1	·	1.6 km	MPC · JPL
699284	2019 KO_{74}	—	April 15, 2008	Mount Lemmon	Mount Lemmon Survey	·	2.0 km	MPC · JPL
699285	2019 LX_{2}	—	November 3, 2012	Haleakala	Pan-STARRS 1	H	330 m	MPC · JPL
699286	2019 LC_{3}	—	February 14, 2016	Haleakala	Pan-STARRS 1	H	320 m	MPC · JPL
699287	2019 LX_{6}	—	February 12, 2016	Haleakala	Pan-STARRS 1	H	300 m	MPC · JPL
699288	2019 LY_{8}	—	October 10, 2008	Mount Lemmon	Mount Lemmon Survey	·	2.5 km	MPC · JPL
699289	2019 LV_{14}	—	June 1, 2019	Haleakala	Pan-STARRS 1	·	1.4 km	MPC · JPL
699290	2019 LK_{15}	—	June 11, 2019	Haleakala	Pan-STARRS 1	H	410 m	MPC · JPL
699291	2019 LT_{15}	—	June 12, 2019	Haleakala	Pan-STARRS 1	LIX	2.4 km	MPC · JPL
699292	2019 LY_{15}	—	June 8, 2019	Haleakala	Pan-STARRS 2	·	2.0 km	MPC · JPL
699293	2019 LZ_{15}	—	June 1, 2019	Haleakala	Pan-STARRS 2	EOS	1.5 km	MPC · JPL
699294	2019 LA_{16}	—	June 1, 2019	Haleakala	Pan-STARRS 2	·	3.3 km	MPC · JPL
699295	2019 LG_{17}	—	June 2, 2019	Haleakala	Pan-STARRS 1	·	1.7 km	MPC · JPL
699296	2019 LP_{20}	—	June 12, 2019	Haleakala	Pan-STARRS 1	KOR	1.2 km	MPC · JPL
699297	2019 LB_{25}	—	June 2, 2019	Haleakala	Pan-STARRS 1	H	320 m	MPC · JPL
699298	2019 LC_{25}	—	June 3, 2019	Haleakala	Pan-STARRS 1	·	2.6 km	MPC · JPL
699299	2019 LT_{27}	—	June 24, 2014	Haleakala	Pan-STARRS 1	H	320 m	MPC · JPL
699300	2019 LV_{27}	—	June 7, 2019	Palomar	Zwicky Transient Facility	EUP	2.8 km	MPC · JPL

== 699301–699400 ==
back to top

Designation			Discovery			Properties		Ref
Permanent	Provisional	Named after	Date	Site	Discoverer(s)	Category	Diam.	Ref
699301	2019 LX_{28}	—	July 26, 2015	Haleakala	Pan-STARRS 1	·	1.7 km	MPC · JPL
699302	2019 LG_{29}	—	June 2, 2019	Haleakala	Pan-STARRS 1	EOS	1.3 km	MPC · JPL
699303	2019 LA_{31}	—	April 19, 2013	Haleakala	Pan-STARRS 1	·	2.6 km	MPC · JPL
699304	2019 LH_{34}	—	June 1, 2019	Haleakala	Pan-STARRS 1	EOS	1.2 km	MPC · JPL
699305	2019 MP	—	December 6, 2012	Kitt Peak	Spacewatch	H	540 m	MPC · JPL
699306	2019 MD_{8}	—	December 5, 2016	Mount Lemmon	Mount Lemmon Survey	·	1.9 km	MPC · JPL
699307	2019 MY_{11}	—	June 24, 2019	Palomar	Zwicky Transient Facility	TIR	2.0 km	MPC · JPL
699308	2019 MZ_{19}	—	June 22, 2019	Haleakala	Pan-STARRS 1	VER	1.9 km	MPC · JPL
699309	2019 ME_{28}	—	June 22, 2019	Haleakala	Pan-STARRS 1	·	2.1 km	MPC · JPL
699310	2019 NW_{28}	—	December 31, 2005	Kitt Peak	Spacewatch	·	1.7 km	MPC · JPL
699311	2019 NQ_{36}	—	July 2, 2019	Haleakala	Pan-STARRS 1	·	1.1 km	MPC · JPL
699312	2019 NE_{41}	—	July 3, 2019	Haleakala	Pan-STARRS 1	EOS	1.4 km	MPC · JPL
699313	2019 NO_{47}	—	July 1, 2019	Haleakala	Pan-STARRS 1	TEL	1.2 km	MPC · JPL
699314	2019 NJ_{48}	—	July 1, 2019	Haleakala	Pan-STARRS 1	L4	7.7 km	MPC · JPL
699315	2019 NV_{51}	—	July 9, 2019	Palomar	Zwicky Transient Facility	·	4.0 km	MPC · JPL
699316	2019 NA_{54}	—	July 4, 2019	Cerro Tololo	DECam	·	2.0 km	MPC · JPL
699317	2019 NC_{72}	—	July 7, 2019	Haleakala	Pan-STARRS 1	·	1.9 km	MPC · JPL
699318	2019 NB_{82}	—	October 8, 2007	Mount Lemmon	Mount Lemmon Survey	·	1.1 km	MPC · JPL
699319	2019 OD_{7}	—	September 30, 2010	Mount Lemmon	Mount Lemmon Survey	·	1.5 km	MPC · JPL
699320	2019 OU_{13}	—	October 1, 2003	Kitt Peak	Spacewatch	·	2.6 km	MPC · JPL
699321	2019 OE_{14}	—	February 11, 2011	Mount Lemmon	Mount Lemmon Survey	·	2.7 km	MPC · JPL
699322	2019 ON_{15}	—	November 1, 2014	Mount Lemmon	Mount Lemmon Survey	·	3.0 km	MPC · JPL
699323	2019 OX_{23}	—	July 28, 2019	Haleakala	Pan-STARRS 2	SYL	3.1 km	MPC · JPL
699324	2019 OC_{24}	—	July 28, 2019	Haleakala	Pan-STARRS 1	URS	2.0 km	MPC · JPL
699325	2019 OH_{24}	—	July 28, 2019	Haleakala	Pan-STARRS 2	·	2.0 km	MPC · JPL
699326	2019 OH_{26}	—	July 25, 2019	Haleakala	Pan-STARRS 1	L4	9.1 km	MPC · JPL
699327	2019 PK_{18}	—	February 5, 2011	Mount Lemmon	Mount Lemmon Survey	·	2.2 km	MPC · JPL
699328	2019 PV_{33}	—	August 8, 2019	Haleakala	Pan-STARRS 1	·	1.7 km	MPC · JPL
699329	2019 PF_{45}	—	August 8, 2019	Haleakala	Pan-STARRS 1	·	2.9 km	MPC · JPL
699330	2019 PO_{51}	—	August 8, 2019	Haleakala	Pan-STARRS 1	EOS	1.1 km	MPC · JPL
699331	2019 PU_{56}	—	August 12, 2019	Haleakala	Pan-STARRS 1	H	330 m	MPC · JPL
699332	2019 PP_{64}	—	August 8, 2019	Haleakala	Pan-STARRS 1	·	2.1 km	MPC · JPL
699333	2019 PF_{69}	—	August 2, 2019	Cerro Tololo	DECam	·	2.2 km	MPC · JPL
699334	2019 PV_{69}	—	August 7, 2019	Haleakala	Pan-STARRS 1	·	2.1 km	MPC · JPL
699335	2019 PR_{78}	—	August 7, 2019	Haleakala	Pan-STARRS 1	·	2.1 km	MPC · JPL
699336	2019 QO_{2}	—	March 17, 2018	Haleakala	Pan-STARRS 1	H	430 m	MPC · JPL
699337	2019 QU_{13}	—	October 25, 2011	Haleakala	Pan-STARRS 1	·	1.3 km	MPC · JPL
699338	2019 QU_{34}	—	February 15, 2013	Haleakala	Pan-STARRS 1	L4	6.6 km	MPC · JPL
699339	2019 QA_{45}	—	January 21, 2014	Mount Lemmon	Mount Lemmon Survey	·	940 m	MPC · JPL
699340	2019 QK_{74}	—	September 21, 2009	Mount Lemmon	Mount Lemmon Survey	L4	6.2 km	MPC · JPL
699341	2019 QF_{87}	—	April 23, 2014	Cerro Tololo	DECam	·	680 m	MPC · JPL
699342	2019 RT_{14}	—	September 10, 2019	Haleakala	Pan-STARRS 1	·	2.9 km	MPC · JPL
699343	2019 RY_{26}	—	October 22, 2006	Kitt Peak	Spacewatch	·	1.6 km	MPC · JPL
699344	2019 RE_{28}	—	September 4, 2019	Mount Lemmon	Mount Lemmon Survey	·	1.6 km	MPC · JPL
699345	2019 SB_{51}	—	December 14, 2015	Mount Lemmon	Mount Lemmon Survey	·	1.1 km	MPC · JPL
699346	2019 SH_{55}	—	September 20, 2003	Kitt Peak	Spacewatch	·	2.6 km	MPC · JPL
699347	2019 SS_{65}	—	September 29, 2009	Mount Lemmon	Mount Lemmon Survey	EOS	1.9 km	MPC · JPL
699348	2019 SY_{80}	—	September 4, 2008	Kitt Peak	Spacewatch	·	1.9 km	MPC · JPL
699349	2019 SO_{92}	—	March 4, 2017	Kitt Peak	Spacewatch	·	2.6 km	MPC · JPL
699350	2019 TS_{13}	—	October 21, 2009	Mount Lemmon	Mount Lemmon Survey	(16286)	1.6 km	MPC · JPL
699351	2019 TB_{16}	—	October 15, 1998	Kitt Peak	Spacewatch	EOS	1.6 km	MPC · JPL
699352	2019 TH_{22}	—	September 29, 2008	Kitt Peak	Spacewatch	·	2.3 km	MPC · JPL
699353	2019 TH_{23}	—	May 30, 2002	Palomar Mountain	NEAT	·	2.2 km	MPC · JPL
699354	2019 TO_{34}	—	October 5, 2019	Haleakala	Pan-STARRS 1	·	570 m	MPC · JPL
699355	2019 TX_{35}	—	October 6, 2019	Haleakala	Pan-STARRS 1	H	440 m	MPC · JPL
699356	2019 TG_{43}	—	April 23, 2014	Haleakala	Pan-STARRS 1	L4	6.8 km	MPC · JPL
699357	2019 TR_{44}	—	October 14, 2019	Haleakala	Pan-STARRS 1	PHO	720 m	MPC · JPL
699358	2019 UT_{19}	—	December 29, 2014	Haleakala	Pan-STARRS 1	·	2.7 km	MPC · JPL
699359	2019 UV_{26}	—	October 3, 2006	Mount Lemmon	Mount Lemmon Survey	·	1.3 km	MPC · JPL
699360	2019 UA_{34}	—	October 24, 2019	Mount Lemmon	Mount Lemmon Survey	·	460 m	MPC · JPL
699361	2019 UT_{34}	—	October 28, 2019	Haleakala	Pan-STARRS 1	·	840 m	MPC · JPL
699362	2019 UR_{35}	—	October 24, 2019	Mount Lemmon	Mount Lemmon Survey	·	1.4 km	MPC · JPL
699363	2019 UO_{67}	—	November 17, 2015	Haleakala	Pan-STARRS 1	MAR	680 m	MPC · JPL
699364	2019 UG_{76}	—	March 28, 2012	Kitt Peak	Spacewatch	·	1.6 km	MPC · JPL
699365	2019 UP_{101}	—	October 23, 2019	Haleakala	Pan-STARRS 1	·	2.0 km	MPC · JPL
699366	2019 UM_{111}	—	October 25, 2019	Haleakala	Pan-STARRS 1	·	710 m	MPC · JPL
699367	2019 UH_{116}	—	October 25, 2019	Haleakala	Pan-STARRS 1	·	640 m	MPC · JPL
699368	2019 UM_{121}	—	October 23, 2019	Mount Lemmon	Mount Lemmon Survey	·	500 m	MPC · JPL
699369	2019 UV_{122}	—	October 31, 2019	Haleakala	Pan-STARRS 1	·	450 m	MPC · JPL
699370	2019 UA_{129}	—	October 26, 2019	Mount Lemmon	Mount Lemmon Survey	·	1.1 km	MPC · JPL
699371	2019 UG_{129}	—	October 24, 2019	Haleakala	Pan-STARRS 1	·	1.4 km	MPC · JPL
699372	2019 VX_{19}	—	November 2, 2019	Haleakala	Pan-STARRS 1	·	480 m	MPC · JPL
699373	2019 VB_{25}	—	November 2, 2019	Haleakala	Pan-STARRS 1	·	1.1 km	MPC · JPL
699374	2019 VL_{31}	—	November 2, 2019	Haleakala	Pan-STARRS 2	·	420 m	MPC · JPL
699375	2019 VH_{35}	—	November 8, 2019	Mount Lemmon	Mount Lemmon Survey	HOF	2.3 km	MPC · JPL
699376	2019 WT_{16}	—	February 26, 2012	Haleakala	Pan-STARRS 1	·	1.3 km	MPC · JPL
699377	2019 WK_{19}	—	November 29, 2019	Haleakala	Pan-STARRS 1	PHO	690 m	MPC · JPL
699378	2019 XG_{5}	—	December 4, 2019	Haleakala	Pan-STARRS 1	·	670 m	MPC · JPL
699379	2019 XV_{10}	—	December 2, 2019	Mount Lemmon	Mount Lemmon Survey	EOS	1.4 km	MPC · JPL
699380	2019 XB_{16}	—	November 5, 1994	Kitt Peak	Spacewatch	·	790 m	MPC · JPL
699381	2019 YS_{7}	—	December 24, 2019	Haleakala	Pan-STARRS 1	V	410 m	MPC · JPL
699382	2019 YD_{8}	—	December 28, 2019	Haleakala	Pan-STARRS 1	V	390 m	MPC · JPL
699383	2019 YO_{8}	—	December 28, 2019	Haleakala	Pan-STARRS 1	·	910 m	MPC · JPL
699384	2019 YP_{8}	—	December 20, 2019	Haleakala	Pan-STARRS 2	·	1.0 km	MPC · JPL
699385	2019 YG_{29}	—	December 28, 2019	Haleakala	Pan-STARRS 1	·	910 m	MPC · JPL
699386	2019 YL_{29}	—	December 24, 2019	Haleakala	Pan-STARRS 1	NYS	920 m	MPC · JPL
699387	2020 AL_{4}	—	January 5, 2020	Mount Lemmon	Mount Lemmon Survey	·	930 m	MPC · JPL
699388	2020 AX_{4}	—	January 2, 2020	Haleakala	Pan-STARRS 1	·	720 m	MPC · JPL
699389	2020 AT_{7}	—	April 7, 2003	Kitt Peak	Spacewatch	·	510 m	MPC · JPL
699390	2020 AP_{19}	—	December 29, 2008	Kitt Peak	Spacewatch	·	2.8 km	MPC · JPL
699391	2020 AW_{20}	—	February 7, 2011	Mount Lemmon	Mount Lemmon Survey	·	1.4 km	MPC · JPL
699392	2020 AS_{22}	—	January 2, 2020	Haleakala	Pan-STARRS 1	·	540 m	MPC · JPL
699393	2020 BZ_{16}	—	January 14, 2011	Mount Lemmon	Mount Lemmon Survey	·	1.2 km	MPC · JPL
699394	2020 BO_{18}	—	January 18, 2020	Haleakala	Pan-STARRS 1	·	880 m	MPC · JPL
699395	2020 BA_{23}	—	April 19, 2006	Mount Lemmon	Mount Lemmon Survey	NYS	720 m	MPC · JPL
699396	2020 BP_{23}	—	December 8, 2015	Haleakala	Pan-STARRS 1	·	650 m	MPC · JPL
699397	2020 BM_{26}	—	January 20, 2020	Haleakala	Pan-STARRS 1	·	540 m	MPC · JPL
699398	2020 BO_{29}	—	January 21, 2020	Haleakala	Pan-STARRS 2	·	590 m	MPC · JPL
699399	2020 BD_{38}	—	January 22, 2020	Haleakala	Pan-STARRS 2	·	980 m	MPC · JPL
699400	2020 BH_{40}	—	September 2, 2017	Haleakala	Pan-STARRS 1	·	3.2 km	MPC · JPL

== 699401–699500 ==
back to top

Designation			Discovery			Properties		Ref
Permanent	Provisional	Named after	Date	Site	Discoverer(s)	Category	Diam.	Ref
699401	2020 BH_{41}	—	March 31, 2009	Mount Lemmon	Mount Lemmon Survey	·	950 m	MPC · JPL
699402	2020 BV_{41}	—	March 16, 2013	Mount Lemmon	Mount Lemmon Survey	NYS	550 m	MPC · JPL
699403	2020 BG_{44}	—	February 8, 2013	Haleakala	Pan-STARRS 1	·	610 m	MPC · JPL
699404	2020 BY_{49}	—	February 4, 2005	Kitt Peak	Spacewatch	MAS	450 m	MPC · JPL
699405	2020 BU_{52}	—	February 22, 2009	Kitt Peak	Spacewatch	NYS	790 m	MPC · JPL
699406	2020 BH_{61}	—	January 23, 2020	Haleakala	Pan-STARRS 1	·	780 m	MPC · JPL
699407	2020 BB_{65}	—	August 27, 2014	Haleakala	Pan-STARRS 1	·	1.0 km	MPC · JPL
699408	2020 BX_{76}	—	April 2, 2016	Haleakala	Pan-STARRS 1	·	1.3 km	MPC · JPL
699409	2020 BV_{88}	—	January 22, 2020	Haleakala	Pan-STARRS 1	·	930 m	MPC · JPL
699410	2020 BY_{89}	—	March 6, 2013	Haleakala	Pan-STARRS 1	NYS	960 m	MPC · JPL
699411	2020 BY_{92}	—	January 28, 2020	Haleakala	Pan-STARRS 1	·	1.1 km	MPC · JPL
699412	2020 BU_{98}	—	May 1, 2013	Mount Lemmon	Mount Lemmon Survey	·	840 m	MPC · JPL
699413	2020 BQ_{103}	—	January 21, 2020	Haleakala	Pan-STARRS 1	·	730 m	MPC · JPL
699414	2020 CM_{3}	—	February 2, 2020	Happy Jack	Thirouin, A.	SDO	177 km	MPC · JPL
699415	2020 CQ_{3}	—	February 1, 2020	Mount Lemmon	Mount Lemmon Survey	ERI	1.0 km	MPC · JPL
699416	2020 DS_{12}	—	February 17, 2020	Mount Lemmon	Mount Lemmon Survey	·	570 m	MPC · JPL
699417	2020 DU_{12}	—	February 29, 2020	Kitt Peak	Bok NEO Survey	·	780 m	MPC · JPL
699418	2020 DX_{12}	—	February 27, 2020	Mount Lemmon	Mount Lemmon Survey	·	730 m	MPC · JPL
699419	2020 DG_{18}	—	February 16, 2020	Mount Lemmon	Mount Lemmon Survey	V	450 m	MPC · JPL
699420	2020 ED_{3}	—	March 5, 2020	Mount Lemmon	Mount Lemmon Survey	·	950 m	MPC · JPL
699421	2020 FY_{8}	—	March 21, 2020	Haleakala	Pan-STARRS 1	EUN	790 m	MPC · JPL
699422	2020 FA_{9}	—	September 17, 2017	Haleakala	Pan-STARRS 1	·	850 m	MPC · JPL
699423	2020 FH_{9}	—	March 21, 2020	Haleakala	Pan-STARRS 1	·	990 m	MPC · JPL
699424	2020 FK_{9}	—	May 7, 2016	Haleakala	Pan-STARRS 1	·	660 m	MPC · JPL
699425	2020 FT_{9}	—	March 21, 2020	Haleakala	Pan-STARRS 1	·	1.1 km	MPC · JPL
699426	2020 FC_{10}	—	March 21, 2020	Haleakala	Pan-STARRS 1	·	1.4 km	MPC · JPL
699427	2020 FM_{10}	—	March 21, 2020	Haleakala	Pan-STARRS 1	EUN	980 m	MPC · JPL
699428	2020 FZ_{10}	—	March 21, 2020	Haleakala	Pan-STARRS 1	·	1.1 km	MPC · JPL
699429	2020 FA_{11}	—	March 21, 2020	Haleakala	Pan-STARRS 1	·	1.0 km	MPC · JPL
699430	2020 FX_{14}	—	March 21, 2020	Haleakala	Pan-STARRS 1	(5)	960 m	MPC · JPL
699431	2020 FT_{17}	—	June 28, 2016	Haleakala	Pan-STARRS 1	·	850 m	MPC · JPL
699432	2020 FM_{33}	—	March 21, 2020	Haleakala	Pan-STARRS 1	(5)	840 m	MPC · JPL
699433	2020 FA_{35}	—	March 21, 2020	Haleakala	Pan-STARRS 1	MAS	420 m	MPC · JPL
699434	2020 FS_{38}	—	October 14, 2009	Mount Lemmon	Mount Lemmon Survey	BAR	1.1 km	MPC · JPL
699435	2020 FL_{39}	—	March 3, 2016	Haleakala	Pan-STARRS 1	EUN	630 m	MPC · JPL
699436	2020 FH_{42}	—	February 9, 2015	Mount Lemmon	Mount Lemmon Survey	AGN	820 m	MPC · JPL
699437	2020 GR_{3}	—	September 25, 2017	Haleakala	Pan-STARRS 1	·	1.1 km	MPC · JPL
699438	2020 GZ_{3}	—	April 2, 2020	Haleakala	Pan-STARRS 1	·	920 m	MPC · JPL
699439	2020 GV_{4}	—	April 2, 2020	Haleakala	Pan-STARRS 1	EUN	900 m	MPC · JPL
699440	2020 GY_{4}	—	September 19, 2017	Haleakala	Pan-STARRS 1	·	1.3 km	MPC · JPL
699441	2020 GR_{5}	—	October 6, 2008	Mount Lemmon	Mount Lemmon Survey	·	1.4 km	MPC · JPL
699442	2020 GW_{5}	—	April 15, 2020	Mount Lemmon	Mount Lemmon Survey	·	720 m	MPC · JPL
699443	2020 GH_{7}	—	October 1, 2013	Mount Lemmon	Mount Lemmon Survey	·	930 m	MPC · JPL
699444	2020 GN_{7}	—	March 7, 2016	Haleakala	Pan-STARRS 1	·	850 m	MPC · JPL
699445	2020 GG_{8}	—	April 15, 2020	Mount Lemmon	Mount Lemmon Survey	·	790 m	MPC · JPL
699446	2020 GO_{8}	—	April 2, 2020	Haleakala	Pan-STARRS 1	·	990 m	MPC · JPL
699447	2020 GZ_{8}	—	March 4, 2016	Haleakala	Pan-STARRS 1	·	690 m	MPC · JPL
699448	2020 GV_{23}	—	April 3, 2020	Mount Lemmon	Mount Lemmon Survey	·	1.2 km	MPC · JPL
699449	2020 GW_{29}	—	April 15, 2020	Mount Lemmon	Mount Lemmon Survey	·	900 m	MPC · JPL
699450	2020 HX_{8}	—	April 1, 2016	Haleakala	Pan-STARRS 1	MAR	860 m	MPC · JPL
699451	2020 HF_{12}	—	April 16, 2020	Mount Lemmon	Mount Lemmon Survey	·	840 m	MPC · JPL
699452	2020 HK_{12}	—	April 16, 2020	Mount Lemmon	Mount Lemmon Survey	·	1.1 km	MPC · JPL
699453	2020 HL_{12}	—	April 16, 2020	Mount Lemmon	Mount Lemmon Survey	·	850 m	MPC · JPL
699454	2020 HN_{13}	—	September 21, 2009	Kitt Peak	Spacewatch	KON	2.0 km	MPC · JPL
699455	2020 HV_{13}	—	May 30, 2016	Haleakala	Pan-STARRS 1	·	1.1 km	MPC · JPL
699456	2020 HZ_{13}	—	April 21, 2020	Haleakala	Pan-STARRS 2	·	1.0 km	MPC · JPL
699457	2020 HG_{14}	—	April 16, 2020	Haleakala	Pan-STARRS 2	L5	7.7 km	MPC · JPL
699458	2020 HR_{16}	—	January 29, 2007	Kitt Peak	Spacewatch	·	980 m	MPC · JPL
699459	2020 HW_{16}	—	April 21, 2020	Haleakala	Pan-STARRS 2	·	1.0 km	MPC · JPL
699460	2020 HF_{17}	—	April 26, 2020	Mount Lemmon	Mount Lemmon Survey	·	1.1 km	MPC · JPL
699461	2020 HL_{17}	—	February 27, 2015	Haleakala	Pan-STARRS 1	·	1.6 km	MPC · JPL
699462	2020 HC_{18}	—	April 28, 2020	Haleakala	Pan-STARRS 1	·	810 m	MPC · JPL
699463	2020 HN_{18}	—	April 17, 2020	Haleakala	Pan-STARRS 1	TIR	2.0 km	MPC · JPL
699464	2020 HS_{18}	—	March 31, 2003	Apache Point	SDSS Collaboration	EUN	900 m	MPC · JPL
699465	2020 HJ_{20}	—	April 3, 2008	Kitt Peak	Spacewatch	L5	6.8 km	MPC · JPL
699466	2020 HK_{20}	—	April 21, 2020	Haleakala	Pan-STARRS 2	·	860 m	MPC · JPL
699467	2020 HP_{20}	—	March 26, 2007	Mount Lemmon	Mount Lemmon Survey	·	990 m	MPC · JPL
699468	2020 HP_{21}	—	April 20, 2020	Haleakala	Pan-STARRS 1	·	1.0 km	MPC · JPL
699469	2020 HL_{23}	—	February 17, 2015	Haleakala	Pan-STARRS 1	·	1.2 km	MPC · JPL
699470	2020 HT_{23}	—	January 18, 2013	Mount Lemmon	Mount Lemmon Survey	·	2.5 km	MPC · JPL
699471	2020 HX_{23}	—	April 24, 2007	Mount Lemmon	Mount Lemmon Survey	·	1.3 km	MPC · JPL
699472	2020 HE_{24}	—	April 15, 2016	Mount Lemmon	Mount Lemmon Survey	·	880 m	MPC · JPL
699473	2020 HO_{25}	—	October 27, 2017	Mount Lemmon	Mount Lemmon Survey	·	1.1 km	MPC · JPL
699474	2020 HL_{27}	—	April 21, 2020	Haleakala	Pan-STARRS 1	·	830 m	MPC · JPL
699475	2020 HD_{30}	—	November 14, 2017	Mount Lemmon	Mount Lemmon Survey	·	950 m	MPC · JPL
699476	2020 HF_{31}	—	April 28, 2020	Haleakala	Pan-STARRS 1	·	1.0 km	MPC · JPL
699477	2020 HV_{32}	—	June 15, 2016	Mount Lemmon	Mount Lemmon Survey	·	900 m	MPC · JPL
699478	2020 HC_{34}	—	April 16, 2020	Mount Lemmon	Mount Lemmon Survey	·	860 m	MPC · JPL
699479	2020 HD_{34}	—	September 14, 2017	Haleakala	Pan-STARRS 1	·	1.1 km	MPC · JPL
699480	2020 HE_{34}	—	April 19, 2020	Haleakala	Pan-STARRS 1	AGN	820 m	MPC · JPL
699481	2020 HG_{34}	—	April 16, 2020	Mount Lemmon	Mount Lemmon Survey	·	960 m	MPC · JPL
699482	2020 HD_{35}	—	June 29, 2016	Haleakala	Pan-STARRS 1	·	730 m	MPC · JPL
699483	2020 HO_{35}	—	June 7, 1999	Kitt Peak	Spacewatch	·	2.4 km	MPC · JPL
699484	2020 HJ_{36}	—	September 23, 2008	Kitt Peak	Spacewatch	·	1.4 km	MPC · JPL
699485	2020 HK_{36}	—	November 17, 2014	Haleakala	Pan-STARRS 1	BRG	1.2 km	MPC · JPL
699486	2020 HY_{36}	—	April 20, 2020	Haleakala	Pan-STARRS 2	EUN	710 m	MPC · JPL
699487	2020 HZ_{36}	—	April 21, 2020	Haleakala	Pan-STARRS 2	·	1.2 km	MPC · JPL
699488	2020 HX_{37}	—	April 17, 2020	Haleakala	Pan-STARRS 1	·	1.2 km	MPC · JPL
699489	2020 HD_{39}	—	April 12, 2016	Haleakala	Pan-STARRS 1	·	910 m	MPC · JPL
699490	2020 HF_{40}	—	November 22, 2014	Mount Lemmon	Mount Lemmon Survey	·	770 m	MPC · JPL
699491	2020 HD_{47}	—	April 30, 2016	Haleakala	Pan-STARRS 1	·	720 m	MPC · JPL
699492	2020 HU_{47}	—	June 8, 2016	Haleakala	Pan-STARRS 1	·	910 m	MPC · JPL
699493	2020 HW_{47}	—	January 13, 2015	Haleakala	Pan-STARRS 1	·	870 m	MPC · JPL
699494	2020 HJ_{48}	—	April 18, 2020	Haleakala	Pan-STARRS 1	·	950 m	MPC · JPL
699495	2020 HT_{61}	—	July 4, 2016	Haleakala	Pan-STARRS 1	·	1.7 km	MPC · JPL
699496	2020 HX_{62}	—	April 6, 2011	Kitt Peak	Spacewatch	·	1.2 km	MPC · JPL
699497	2020 HK_{63}	—	November 15, 2017	Mount Lemmon	Mount Lemmon Survey	·	1.1 km	MPC · JPL
699498	2020 HN_{65}	—	September 15, 2017	Haleakala	Pan-STARRS 1	·	730 m	MPC · JPL
699499	2020 HP_{66}	—	April 12, 2016	Haleakala	Pan-STARRS 1	·	1.0 km	MPC · JPL
699500	2020 HT_{73}	—	March 14, 2007	Mount Lemmon	Mount Lemmon Survey	HNS	810 m	MPC · JPL

== 699501–699600 ==
back to top

Designation			Discovery			Properties		Ref
Permanent	Provisional	Named after	Date	Site	Discoverer(s)	Category	Diam.	Ref
699501	2020 HG_{81}	—	April 19, 2020	Haleakala	Pan-STARRS 1	MAR	630 m	MPC · JPL
699502	2020 HG_{88}	—	September 10, 2013	Haleakala	Pan-STARRS 1	·	720 m	MPC · JPL
699503	2020 HP_{92}	—	April 19, 2020	Haleakala	Pan-STARRS 1	AGN	910 m	MPC · JPL
699504	2020 HP_{94}	—	April 21, 2020	Haleakala	Pan-STARRS 1	·	1.5 km	MPC · JPL
699505	2020 HP_{98}	—	April 27, 2020	Haleakala	Pan-STARRS 1	HNS	820 m	MPC · JPL
699506	2020 HQ_{98}	—	March 12, 2007	Mount Lemmon	Mount Lemmon Survey	·	1.1 km	MPC · JPL
699507	2020 HX_{98}	—	April 24, 2020	Mount Lemmon	Mount Lemmon Survey	·	990 m	MPC · JPL
699508	2020 HG_{99}	—	April 18, 2015	Cerro Tololo	DECam	·	1.3 km	MPC · JPL
699509	2020 HM_{99}	—	April 20, 2020	Haleakala	Pan-STARRS 1	·	1.4 km	MPC · JPL
699510	2020 HA_{104}	—	April 21, 2020	Haleakala	Pan-STARRS 1	ADE	1.5 km	MPC · JPL
699511	2020 HR_{106}	—	February 25, 2007	Kitt Peak	Spacewatch	·	930 m	MPC · JPL
699512	2020 HZ_{109}	—	November 11, 2013	Kitt Peak	Spacewatch	·	1.1 km	MPC · JPL
699513	2020 HN_{111}	—	October 5, 2013	Haleakala	Pan-STARRS 1	·	1.2 km	MPC · JPL
699514	2020 HR_{112}	—	April 18, 2020	Mount Lemmon	Mount Lemmon Survey	·	1.1 km	MPC · JPL
699515	2020 HY_{113}	—	December 11, 2010	Mount Lemmon	Mount Lemmon Survey	·	1.0 km	MPC · JPL
699516	2020 HD_{115}	—	October 8, 2012	Charleston	R. Holmes	·	1.5 km	MPC · JPL
699517	2020 HT_{115}	—	April 21, 2020	Haleakala	Pan-STARRS 2	L5	6.5 km	MPC · JPL
699518	2020 HN_{119}	—	April 16, 2020	Haleakala	Pan-STARRS 1	·	960 m	MPC · JPL
699519	2020 HP_{130}	—	April 30, 2016	Haleakala	Pan-STARRS 1	·	620 m	MPC · JPL
699520	2020 HH_{132}	—	April 24, 2020	Mount Lemmon	Mount Lemmon Survey	JUN	750 m	MPC · JPL
699521	2020 HJ_{132}	—	April 20, 2020	Haleakala	Pan-STARRS 1	·	670 m	MPC · JPL
699522	2020 HB_{142}	—	September 15, 2017	Haleakala	Pan-STARRS 1	·	1.3 km	MPC · JPL
699523	2020 HA_{143}	—	April 30, 2016	Haleakala	Pan-STARRS 1	·	940 m	MPC · JPL
699524	2020 HN_{144}	—	April 27, 2012	Haleakala	Pan-STARRS 1	·	710 m	MPC · JPL
699525	2020 HX_{154}	—	April 21, 2020	Haleakala	Pan-STARRS 1	·	600 m	MPC · JPL
699526	2020 HC_{163}	—	December 14, 2018	Mount Lemmon	Mount Lemmon Survey	HNS	790 m	MPC · JPL
699527	2020 HX_{165}	—	September 25, 2017	Haleakala	Pan-STARRS 1	·	1.1 km	MPC · JPL
699528	2020 HS_{167}	—	April 27, 2020	Haleakala	Pan-STARRS 1	·	1.4 km	MPC · JPL
699529	2020 JE_{8}	—	February 18, 2015	Mount Lemmon	Mount Lemmon Survey	·	1.3 km	MPC · JPL
699530	2020 JN_{8}	—	January 20, 2015	Haleakala	Pan-STARRS 1	·	1.1 km	MPC · JPL
699531	2020 JO_{8}	—	December 20, 2009	Mount Lemmon	Mount Lemmon Survey	·	1.2 km	MPC · JPL
699532	2020 JY_{8}	—	May 15, 2020	Haleakala	Pan-STARRS 1	·	1.3 km	MPC · JPL
699533	2020 JM_{10}	—	June 16, 2012	Mount Lemmon	Mount Lemmon Survey	MAR	1.1 km	MPC · JPL
699534	2020 JR_{10}	—	February 13, 2015	Mount Lemmon	Mount Lemmon Survey	·	940 m	MPC · JPL
699535	2020 JS_{10}	—	May 15, 2020	Haleakala	Pan-STARRS 1	·	1.4 km	MPC · JPL
699536	2020 JX_{10}	—	March 12, 2007	Kitt Peak	Spacewatch	·	990 m	MPC · JPL
699537	2020 JN_{13}	—	October 2, 2008	Mount Lemmon	Mount Lemmon Survey	·	970 m	MPC · JPL
699538	2020 JE_{16}	—	May 15, 2020	Haleakala	Pan-STARRS 1	·	1.3 km	MPC · JPL
699539	2020 JG_{21}	—	May 15, 2020	Haleakala	Pan-STARRS 1	·	1.1 km	MPC · JPL
699540	2020 JT_{21}	—	August 26, 2003	Cerro Tololo	Deep Ecliptic Survey	·	1.1 km	MPC · JPL
699541	2020 JV_{21}	—	May 14, 2020	Haleakala	Pan-STARRS 1	·	940 m	MPC · JPL
699542	2020 JY_{21}	—	May 14, 2020	Haleakala	Pan-STARRS 1	·	1.2 km	MPC · JPL
699543	2020 JB_{26}	—	May 11, 2020	Haleakala	Pan-STARRS 2	·	1.1 km	MPC · JPL
699544	2020 JH_{26}	—	December 3, 2010	Mount Lemmon	Mount Lemmon Survey	·	770 m	MPC · JPL
699545	2020 JS_{31}	—	May 15, 2020	Haleakala	Pan-STARRS 1	·	1.1 km	MPC · JPL
699546	2020 JP_{32}	—	May 15, 2020	Haleakala	Pan-STARRS 1	·	1.5 km	MPC · JPL
699547	2020 JV_{32}	—	May 2, 2020	Mount Lemmon	Mount Lemmon Survey	·	1.4 km	MPC · JPL
699548	2020 JQ_{34}	—	May 15, 2020	Haleakala	Pan-STARRS 1	·	1.1 km	MPC · JPL
699549	2020 JE_{35}	—	May 14, 2020	Haleakala	Pan-STARRS 1	(194)	1.5 km	MPC · JPL
699550	2020 JL_{35}	—	May 12, 2020	Haleakala	Pan-STARRS 1	EUN	760 m	MPC · JPL
699551	2020 JP_{35}	—	May 14, 2020	Haleakala	Pan-STARRS 1	·	1.1 km	MPC · JPL
699552	2020 JU_{38}	—	August 4, 2008	La Sagra	OAM	·	830 m	MPC · JPL
699553	2020 JZ_{38}	—	May 15, 2020	Haleakala	Pan-STARRS 1	·	660 m	MPC · JPL
699554	2020 JC_{40}	—	May 14, 2020	Haleakala	Pan-STARRS 1	·	840 m	MPC · JPL
699555	2020 KV_{8}	—	September 23, 2008	Mount Lemmon	Mount Lemmon Survey	·	1.4 km	MPC · JPL
699556	2020 KW_{8}	—	July 3, 2016	Haleakala	Pan-STARRS 1	·	1.8 km	MPC · JPL
699557	2020 KZ_{8}	—	January 12, 2019	Haleakala	Pan-STARRS 1	·	1.1 km	MPC · JPL
699558	2020 KE_{10}	—	December 4, 2007	Kitt Peak	Spacewatch	·	820 m	MPC · JPL
699559	2020 KF_{11}	—	May 20, 2020	Haleakala	Pan-STARRS 1	·	1.7 km	MPC · JPL
699560	2020 KN_{11}	—	May 21, 2020	Haleakala	Pan-STARRS 1	·	970 m	MPC · JPL
699561	2020 KJ_{13}	—	July 12, 2016	Haleakala	Pan-STARRS 1	·	1.1 km	MPC · JPL
699562	2020 KU_{15}	—	May 25, 2020	Haleakala	Pan-STARRS 2	·	1.7 km	MPC · JPL
699563	2020 KS_{17}	—	April 29, 2014	Haleakala	Pan-STARRS 1	·	1.5 km	MPC · JPL
699564	2020 KX_{17}	—	May 25, 2020	Mount Lemmon	Mount Lemmon Survey	·	1.0 km	MPC · JPL
699565	2020 KD_{18}	—	April 28, 2014	Cerro Tololo	DECam	·	1.5 km	MPC · JPL
699566	2020 KO_{20}	—	October 27, 2008	Mount Lemmon	Mount Lemmon Survey	·	1.2 km	MPC · JPL
699567	2020 KE_{22}	—	October 9, 2012	Haleakala	Pan-STARRS 1	·	1.4 km	MPC · JPL
699568	2020 KP_{22}	—	May 21, 2020	Haleakala	Pan-STARRS 1	MAR	930 m	MPC · JPL
699569	2020 KF_{33}	—	May 25, 2020	Haleakala	Pan-STARRS 1	EUN	1.0 km	MPC · JPL
699570	2020 KO_{37}	—	May 26, 2020	Haleakala	Pan-STARRS 1	·	1.4 km	MPC · JPL
699571	2020 KS_{40}	—	May 20, 2020	Haleakala	Pan-STARRS 1	·	1.2 km	MPC · JPL
699572	2020 KC_{41}	—	May 17, 2020	Haleakala	Pan-STARRS 1	MAR	670 m	MPC · JPL
699573	2020 KX_{42}	—	July 19, 2010	WISE	WISE	·	2.1 km	MPC · JPL
699574	2020 KA_{51}	—	May 28, 2020	Haleakala	Pan-STARRS 1	·	1.3 km	MPC · JPL
699575	2020 KX_{64}	—	May 23, 2020	Haleakala	Pan-STARRS 1	·	680 m	MPC · JPL
699576	2020 LU_{3}	—	November 29, 2014	Mount Lemmon	Mount Lemmon Survey	·	1.2 km	MPC · JPL
699577	2020 LG_{5}	—	June 11, 2020	Haleakala	Pan-STARRS 2	·	1.1 km	MPC · JPL
699578	2020 LO_{5}	—	May 20, 2020	Haleakala	Pan-STARRS 1	·	1.0 km	MPC · JPL
699579	2020 LM_{7}	—	May 5, 2014	Cerro Tololo	DECam	·	1.7 km	MPC · JPL
699580	2020 LP_{7}	—	May 11, 2015	Mount Lemmon	Mount Lemmon Survey	NEM	1.7 km	MPC · JPL
699581	2020 LH_{14}	—	May 20, 2015	Cerro Tololo	DECam	KOR	1.1 km	MPC · JPL
699582	2020 LT_{14}	—	September 12, 2016	Haleakala	Pan-STARRS 1	·	1.5 km	MPC · JPL
699583	2020 LA_{15}	—	June 15, 2020	Haleakala	Pan-STARRS 1	·	1.5 km	MPC · JPL
699584	2020 LC_{15}	—	June 15, 2020	Haleakala	Pan-STARRS 1	·	1.8 km	MPC · JPL
699585	2020 LS_{16}	—	June 14, 2020	Haleakala	Pan-STARRS 1	·	1.1 km	MPC · JPL
699586	2020 MO_{6}	—	June 21, 2020	Haleakala	Pan-STARRS 1	·	960 m	MPC · JPL
699587	2020 MA_{8}	—	January 7, 2006	Kitt Peak	Spacewatch	·	2.2 km	MPC · JPL
699588	2020 MO_{10}	—	June 30, 2020	Haleakala	Pan-STARRS 1	·	2.1 km	MPC · JPL
699589	2020 MP_{10}	—	June 30, 2020	Haleakala	Pan-STARRS 1	·	2.2 km	MPC · JPL
699590	2020 MX_{17}	—	June 29, 2020	Haleakala	Pan-STARRS 1	·	2.2 km	MPC · JPL
699591	2020 MC_{18}	—	June 29, 2020	Haleakala	Pan-STARRS 1	·	1.3 km	MPC · JPL
699592	2020 MS_{18}	—	June 29, 2020	Haleakala	Pan-STARRS 1	·	2.7 km	MPC · JPL
699593	2020 MG_{23}	—	June 17, 2020	Haleakala	Pan-STARRS 1	WIT	800 m	MPC · JPL
699594	2020 ME_{32}	—	June 29, 2020	Haleakala	Pan-STARRS 1	KOR	960 m	MPC · JPL
699595	2020 ML_{37}	—	August 27, 2016	Haleakala	Pan-STARRS 1	·	1.7 km	MPC · JPL
699596	2020 MY_{37}	—	June 28, 2020	Haleakala	Pan-STARRS 1	·	2.1 km	MPC · JPL
699597	2020 MC_{38}	—	April 28, 2014	Cerro Tololo	DECam	·	1.2 km	MPC · JPL
699598	2020 MZ_{39}	—	June 27, 2020	Haleakala	Pan-STARRS 1	·	2.4 km	MPC · JPL
699599	2020 MH_{40}	—	June 27, 2020	Haleakala	Pan-STARRS 1	·	1.5 km	MPC · JPL
699600	2020 MO_{42}	—	June 23, 2020	Haleakala	Pan-STARRS 1	·	1.3 km	MPC · JPL

== 699601–699700 ==
back to top

Designation			Discovery			Properties		Ref
Permanent	Provisional	Named after	Date	Site	Discoverer(s)	Category	Diam.	Ref
699601	2020 MA_{43}	—	June 21, 2020	Haleakala	Pan-STARRS 1	·	1.4 km	MPC · JPL
699602	2020 MH_{44}	—	June 29, 2020	Haleakala	Pan-STARRS 1	·	1.4 km	MPC · JPL
699603	2020 MS_{46}	—	June 21, 2020	Haleakala	Pan-STARRS 1	KON	1.6 km	MPC · JPL
699604	2020 MY_{47}	—	September 17, 2006	Kitt Peak	Spacewatch	·	1.4 km	MPC · JPL
699605	2020 MB_{60}	—	December 21, 2014	Mount Lemmon	Mount Lemmon Survey	·	790 m	MPC · JPL
699606	2020 OT_{13}	—	July 18, 2020	Haleakala	Pan-STARRS 1	EOS	1.3 km	MPC · JPL
699607	2020 OG_{29}	—	April 30, 2014	Haleakala	Pan-STARRS 1	·	1.4 km	MPC · JPL
699608	2020 OK_{29}	—	April 23, 2014	Cerro Tololo	DECam	·	1.2 km	MPC · JPL
699609	2020 OW_{29}	—	July 22, 2020	Haleakala	Pan-STARRS 2	·	2.5 km	MPC · JPL
699610	2020 OB_{30}	—	July 28, 2020	Haleakala	Pan-STARRS 1	EOS	1.5 km	MPC · JPL
699611	2020 OA_{32}	—	July 28, 2020	Haleakala	Pan-STARRS 1	·	2.5 km	MPC · JPL
699612	2020 OE_{35}	—	July 18, 2020	Haleakala	Pan-STARRS 1	·	1.8 km	MPC · JPL
699613	2020 OU_{35}	—	July 20, 2020	Haleakala	Pan-STARRS 1	·	1.6 km	MPC · JPL
699614	2020 OH_{39}	—	July 18, 2020	Haleakala	Pan-STARRS 1	·	2.1 km	MPC · JPL
699615	2020 OH_{42}	—	July 28, 2020	Haleakala	Pan-STARRS 2	·	2.7 km	MPC · JPL
699616	2020 OK_{42}	—	July 29, 2020	Haleakala	Pan-STARRS 1	·	2.3 km	MPC · JPL
699617	2020 OB_{44}	—	July 18, 2020	Haleakala	Pan-STARRS 1	·	3.0 km	MPC · JPL
699618	2020 ON_{64}	—	July 20, 2020	Haleakala	Pan-STARRS 1	·	1.6 km	MPC · JPL
699619	2020 OW_{77}	—	July 29, 2020	Haleakala	Pan-STARRS 1	EOS	1.4 km	MPC · JPL
699620	2020 OJ_{83}	—	May 8, 2013	Haleakala	Pan-STARRS 1	·	2.6 km	MPC · JPL
699621	2020 OW_{83}	—	March 17, 2018	Mount Lemmon	Mount Lemmon Survey	·	2.1 km	MPC · JPL
699622	2020 OX_{84}	—	November 24, 2011	Haleakala	Pan-STARRS 1	EOS	1.5 km	MPC · JPL
699623	2020 OO_{93}	—	July 20, 2020	Haleakala	Pan-STARRS 1	·	2.3 km	MPC · JPL
699624	2020 ON_{94}	—	July 22, 2020	Haleakala	Pan-STARRS 1	KOR	990 m	MPC · JPL
699625	2020 OY_{101}	—	July 28, 2020	Haleakala	Pan-STARRS 1	·	1.5 km	MPC · JPL
699626	2020 OE_{102}	—	July 29, 2020	Haleakala	Pan-STARRS 1	·	3.1 km	MPC · JPL
699627	2020 OQ_{102}	—	July 18, 2020	Haleakala	Pan-STARRS 1	·	2.1 km	MPC · JPL
699628	2020 OB_{103}	—	July 29, 2020	Mount Lemmon	Mount Lemmon Survey	·	2.6 km	MPC · JPL
699629	2020 OG_{103}	—	July 23, 2020	Haleakala	Pan-STARRS 1	·	1.9 km	MPC · JPL
699630	2020 OH_{103}	—	July 23, 2020	Haleakala	Pan-STARRS 1	·	2.3 km	MPC · JPL
699631	2020 OB_{104}	—	July 18, 2020	Haleakala	Pan-STARRS 1	EOS	1.5 km	MPC · JPL
699632	2020 OB_{105}	—	July 18, 2020	Haleakala	Pan-STARRS 1	·	2.2 km	MPC · JPL
699633	2020 OE_{105}	—	July 18, 2020	Haleakala	Pan-STARRS 1	·	1.9 km	MPC · JPL
699634	2020 OP_{105}	—	July 18, 2020	Haleakala	Pan-STARRS 1	·	1.2 km	MPC · JPL
699635	2020 OU_{106}	—	September 12, 2015	Haleakala	Pan-STARRS 1	·	2.1 km	MPC · JPL
699636	2020 OV_{106}	—	July 18, 2020	Haleakala	Pan-STARRS 1	·	2.1 km	MPC · JPL
699637	2020 OJ_{112}	—	October 1, 2010	Mount Lemmon	Mount Lemmon Survey	·	2.0 km	MPC · JPL
699638	2020 OY_{129}	—	April 9, 2019	Haleakala	Pan-STARRS 1	·	1.5 km	MPC · JPL
699639	2020 OP_{132}	—	July 22, 2020	Haleakala	Pan-STARRS 1	HOF	1.8 km	MPC · JPL
699640	2020 PL_{8}	—	October 4, 2014	Mount Lemmon	Mount Lemmon Survey	·	3.2 km	MPC · JPL
699641	2020 PK_{10}	—	September 25, 2009	Kitt Peak	Spacewatch	·	2.3 km	MPC · JPL
699642	2020 PC_{12}	—	May 26, 2014	Haleakala	Pan-STARRS 1	EOS	1.4 km	MPC · JPL
699643	2020 PL_{12}	—	April 5, 2014	Haleakala	Pan-STARRS 1	·	1.6 km	MPC · JPL
699644	2020 PO_{15}	—	September 12, 2015	Haleakala	Pan-STARRS 1	·	1.8 km	MPC · JPL
699645	2020 PV_{16}	—	August 15, 2020	Haleakala	Pan-STARRS 1	·	2.3 km	MPC · JPL
699646	2020 PG_{18}	—	May 11, 2019	Haleakala	Pan-STARRS 1	·	2.1 km	MPC · JPL
699647	2020 PC_{23}	—	August 15, 2020	Mount Lemmon	Mount Lemmon Survey	·	1.8 km	MPC · JPL
699648	2020 PD_{40}	—	April 28, 2014	Cerro Tololo	DECam	NAE	1.5 km	MPC · JPL
699649	2020 PP_{51}	—	December 2, 2010	Mount Lemmon	Mount Lemmon Survey	·	2.0 km	MPC · JPL
699650	2020 PV_{58}	—	August 14, 2020	Haleakala	Pan-STARRS 1	VER	2.0 km	MPC · JPL
699651	2020 PU_{61}	—	August 12, 2020	Haleakala	Pan-STARRS 1	·	2.0 km	MPC · JPL
699652	2020 PH_{63}	—	August 11, 2020	Haleakala	Pan-STARRS 1	EOS	1.4 km	MPC · JPL
699653	2020 PS_{75}	—	August 12, 2020	Haleakala	Pan-STARRS 1	·	2.3 km	MPC · JPL
699654	2020 PU_{75}	—	August 14, 2020	Haleakala	Pan-STARRS 1	·	1.4 km	MPC · JPL
699655	2020 PF_{76}	—	August 13, 2020	Haleakala	Pan-STARRS 1	·	1.9 km	MPC · JPL
699656	2020 PN_{76}	—	August 14, 2020	Haleakala	Pan-STARRS 1	EOS	1.2 km	MPC · JPL
699657	2020 PT_{79}	—	August 13, 2020	Haleakala	Pan-STARRS 2	·	2.3 km	MPC · JPL
699658	2020 PM_{97}	—	August 11, 2020	Haleakala	Pan-STARRS 1	·	570 m	MPC · JPL
699659	2020 QL_{3}	—	May 9, 2011	Mount Lemmon	Mount Lemmon Survey	·	1.3 km	MPC · JPL
699660	2020 QR_{8}	—	August 16, 2020	Haleakala	Pan-STARRS 2	·	2.8 km	MPC · JPL
699661	2020 QY_{13}	—	August 19, 2020	Haleakala	Pan-STARRS 1	·	2.5 km	MPC · JPL
699662	2020 QR_{16}	—	August 17, 2020	Haleakala	Pan-STARRS 1	EOS	1.5 km	MPC · JPL
699663	2020 QU_{17}	—	August 19, 2020	Haleakala	Pan-STARRS 2	·	2.4 km	MPC · JPL
699664	2020 QC_{27}	—	August 19, 2020	Haleakala	Pan-STARRS 1	·	2.3 km	MPC · JPL
699665	2020 QV_{27}	—	August 23, 2020	Haleakala	Pan-STARRS 1	·	2.4 km	MPC · JPL
699666	2020 QE_{28}	—	August 27, 2020	Haleakala	Pan-STARRS 2	·	2.3 km	MPC · JPL
699667	2020 QR_{30}	—	August 18, 2020	Haleakala	Pan-STARRS 1	·	2.3 km	MPC · JPL
699668	2020 QN_{83}	—	August 17, 2020	Haleakala	Pan-STARRS 1	·	2.1 km	MPC · JPL
699669	2020 QT_{84}	—	August 17, 2020	Haleakala	Pan-STARRS 1	·	2.3 km	MPC · JPL
699670	2020 QD_{85}	—	December 14, 2010	Mount Lemmon	Mount Lemmon Survey	·	2.3 km	MPC · JPL
699671	2020 QZ_{96}	—	August 19, 2020	Haleakala	Pan-STARRS 1	·	1.7 km	MPC · JPL
699672	2020 QP_{108}	—	August 19, 2020	Mount Lemmon	Mount Lemmon Survey	·	1.5 km	MPC · JPL
699673	2020 RE_{7}	—	September 12, 2020	Haleakala	Pan-STARRS 1	centaur	30 km	MPC · JPL
699674	2020 RV_{23}	—	September 9, 2020	Haleakala	Pan-STARRS 1	·	2.2 km	MPC · JPL
699675	2020 RN_{25}	—	April 16, 2013	Haleakala	Pan-STARRS 1	HYG	2.3 km	MPC · JPL
699676	2020 RT_{26}	—	September 13, 2020	Haleakala	Pan-STARRS 1	·	2.3 km	MPC · JPL
699677	2020 RE_{27}	—	September 14, 2020	Haleakala	Pan-STARRS 1	·	2.6 km	MPC · JPL
699678	2020 RG_{27}	—	August 24, 2020	Palomar	Zwicky Transient Facility	(1547)	1.2 km	MPC · JPL
699679	2020 RS_{37}	—	January 8, 2011	Mount Lemmon	Mount Lemmon Survey	·	2.5 km	MPC · JPL
699680	2020 RF_{48}	—	July 1, 2014	Haleakala	Pan-STARRS 1	EOS	1.5 km	MPC · JPL
699681	2020 RH_{48}	—	April 17, 2013	Haleakala	Pan-STARRS 1	·	2.9 km	MPC · JPL
699682	2020 RB_{51}	—	September 15, 2020	Mount Lemmon	Mount Lemmon Survey	·	2.6 km	MPC · JPL
699683	2020 RM_{78}	—	September 9, 2020	Haleakala	Pan-STARRS 1	·	1.8 km	MPC · JPL
699684	2020 RW_{87}	—	April 19, 2015	Cerro Tololo	DECam	L4	5.5 km	MPC · JPL
699685	2020 RE_{88}	—	January 26, 2012	Mount Lemmon	Mount Lemmon Survey	L4	5.9 km	MPC · JPL
699686	2020 RR_{94}	—	September 12, 2020	Haleakala	Pan-STARRS 1	·	1.5 km	MPC · JPL
699687	2020 RS_{97}	—	September 10, 2020	Mount Lemmon	Mount Lemmon Survey	·	1.8 km	MPC · JPL
699688	2020 RK_{101}	—	November 13, 2010	Mount Lemmon	Mount Lemmon Survey	L4	6.6 km	MPC · JPL
699689	2020 RB_{104}	—	September 11, 2020	Haleakala	Pan-STARRS 2	·	1.6 km	MPC · JPL
699690	2020 RS_{115}	—	September 9, 2020	Haleakala	Pan-STARRS 1	·	2.1 km	MPC · JPL
699691	2020 RG_{116}	—	September 10, 2020	Mount Lemmon	Mount Lemmon Survey	·	2.5 km	MPC · JPL
699692	2020 RN_{117}	—	January 18, 2015	Mount Lemmon	Mount Lemmon Survey	3:2	4.2 km	MPC · JPL
699693	2020 RX_{120}	—	September 13, 2020	Haleakala	Pan-STARRS 1	L4	5.7 km	MPC · JPL
699694	2020 RA_{122}	—	September 12, 2020	Haleakala	Pan-STARRS 1	·	2.3 km	MPC · JPL
699695	2020 RB_{130}	—	October 9, 2015	Haleakala	Pan-STARRS 1	·	2.5 km	MPC · JPL
699696	2020 RC_{161}	—	March 17, 2018	Haleakala	Pan-STARRS 1	LIX	2.6 km	MPC · JPL
699697	2020 SG_{7}	—	May 26, 2015	Haleakala	Pan-STARRS 1	·	2.0 km	MPC · JPL
699698	2020 SP_{34}	—	October 27, 2009	Kitt Peak	Spacewatch	·	870 m	MPC · JPL
699699	2020 SG_{35}	—	September 16, 2020	Haleakala	Pan-STARRS 2	·	1.9 km	MPC · JPL
699700	2020 SG_{74}	—	September 16, 2009	Mount Lemmon	Mount Lemmon Survey	ELF	2.8 km	MPC · JPL

== 699701–699800 ==
back to top

Designation			Discovery			Properties		Ref
Permanent	Provisional	Named after	Date	Site	Discoverer(s)	Category	Diam.	Ref
699701	2020 SL_{81}	—	September 23, 2020	Mount Lemmon	Mount Lemmon Survey	THM	1.6 km	MPC · JPL
699702	2020 SR_{83}	—	July 4, 2014	Haleakala	Pan-STARRS 1	·	2.3 km	MPC · JPL
699703	2020 SF_{106}	—	March 21, 2018	Mount Lemmon	Mount Lemmon Survey	LIX	2.6 km	MPC · JPL
699704	2020 TT_{10}	—	February 3, 2008	Kitt Peak	Spacewatch	AGN	990 m	MPC · JPL
699705	2020 TY_{11}	—	January 10, 2008	Kitt Peak	Spacewatch	HOF	2.1 km	MPC · JPL
699706	2020 TL_{65}	—	April 23, 2014	Cerro Tololo	DECam	L4	5.9 km	MPC · JPL
699707	2020 UZ_{53}	—	January 28, 2017	Haleakala	Pan-STARRS 1	·	1.7 km	MPC · JPL
699708	2020 US_{77}	—	April 12, 2018	Mount Lemmon	Mount Lemmon Survey	TIR	2.2 km	MPC · JPL
699709	2020 VT_{21}	—	August 29, 2008	Mauna Kea	P. A. Wiegert	·	1.8 km	MPC · JPL
699710	2020 YM_{9}	—	January 2, 2012	Kitt Peak	Spacewatch	·	1.4 km	MPC · JPL
699711	2020 YF_{22}	—	September 20, 2011	Mount Lemmon	Mount Lemmon Survey	·	3.0 km	MPC · JPL
699712	2021 AO_{9}	—	May 23, 2014	Haleakala	Pan-STARRS 1	V	530 m	MPC · JPL
699713	2021 BE_{6}	—	January 17, 2021	Mount Lemmon	Mount Lemmon Survey	H	320 m	MPC · JPL
699714	2021 CJ_{10}	—	August 16, 2009	Kitt Peak	Spacewatch	H	370 m	MPC · JPL
699715	2021 CL_{21}	—	February 15, 2021	Mount Lemmon	Mount Lemmon Survey	H	430 m	MPC · JPL
699716	2021 EF_{8}	—	October 17, 2003	Kitt Peak	Spacewatch	·	1.9 km	MPC · JPL
699717	2021 EQ_{13}	—	January 29, 2017	Haleakala	Pan-STARRS 1	·	800 m	MPC · JPL
699718	2021 ER_{34}	—	November 1, 2005	Kitt Peak	Spacewatch	·	1.3 km	MPC · JPL
699719	2021 EZ_{37}	—	August 30, 2005	Kitt Peak	Spacewatch	·	540 m	MPC · JPL
699720	2021 EW_{44}	—	March 3, 2016	Haleakala	Pan-STARRS 1	·	1.4 km	MPC · JPL
699721	2021 FK_{21}	—	March 23, 2021	Kitt Peak	Bok NEO Survey	EUN	790 m	MPC · JPL
699722	2021 FA_{24}	—	January 30, 2011	Mount Lemmon	Mount Lemmon Survey	DOR	2.1 km	MPC · JPL
699723	2021 FU_{31}	—	September 4, 2012	Haleakala	Pan-STARRS 1	·	2.2 km	MPC · JPL
699724	2021 FM_{33}	—	January 16, 2015	Haleakala	Pan-STARRS 1	·	2.8 km	MPC · JPL
699725	2021 FO_{34}	—	May 18, 2018	Mount Lemmon	Mount Lemmon Survey	·	730 m	MPC · JPL
699726	2021 GR_{12}	—	April 9, 2021	Haleakala	Pan-STARRS 1	APO +1km	890 m	MPC · JPL
699727	2021 GM_{13}	—	November 24, 2019	Mount Lemmon	Mount Lemmon Survey	·	810 m	MPC · JPL
699728	2021 GZ_{20}	—	March 6, 2011	Mount Lemmon	Mount Lemmon Survey	KOR	1.3 km	MPC · JPL
699729	2021 GQ_{52}	—	November 4, 2012	Mount Lemmon	Mount Lemmon Survey	·	2.4 km	MPC · JPL
699730	2021 GQ_{55}	—	November 27, 2013	Haleakala	Pan-STARRS 1	·	2.2 km	MPC · JPL
699731	2021 GQ_{69}	—	July 25, 2017	Haleakala	Pan-STARRS 1	EOS	1.5 km	MPC · JPL
699732	2021 GC_{81}	—	April 10, 2021	Haleakala	Pan-STARRS 1	·	420 m	MPC · JPL
699733	2021 GL_{194}	—	October 9, 2019	Mount Lemmon	Mount Lemmon Survey	·	690 m	MPC · JPL
699734	2021 HD_{11}	—	April 17, 2021	Haleakala	Pan-STARRS 1	·	1.2 km	MPC · JPL
699735	2021 JJ_{10}	—	June 17, 2018	Haleakala	Pan-STARRS 1	·	470 m	MPC · JPL
699736	2021 JU_{11}	—	December 31, 2013	Haleakala	Pan-STARRS 1	·	420 m	MPC · JPL
699737	2021 JW_{56}	—	May 12, 2021	Haleakala	Pan-STARRS 1	·	480 m	MPC · JPL
699738	2021 JY_{56}	—	May 12, 2021	Haleakala	Pan-STARRS 1	·	450 m	MPC · JPL
699739	2021 JA_{58}	—	December 26, 2013	Haleakala	Pan-STARRS 1	·	1.3 km	MPC · JPL
699740	2021 KJ_{6}	—	May 20, 2021	Haleakala	Pan-STARRS 1	·	980 m	MPC · JPL
699741	2021 KM_{9}	—	July 3, 2016	Mount Lemmon	Mount Lemmon Survey	VER	2.0 km	MPC · JPL
699742	2021 KP_{11}	—	September 25, 2008	Mount Lemmon	Mount Lemmon Survey	·	500 m	MPC · JPL
699743	2021 LY_{22}	—	March 27, 2017	Haleakala	Pan-STARRS 1	·	540 m	MPC · JPL
699744	2021 LQ_{33}	—	September 30, 2005	Mount Lemmon	Mount Lemmon Survey	·	440 m	MPC · JPL
699745	2021 LV_{36}	—	June 13, 2021	Haleakala	Pan-STARRS 1	·	1.1 km	MPC · JPL
699746	2021 MG_{5}	—	September 25, 2012	Mount Lemmon	Mount Lemmon Survey	·	500 m	MPC · JPL
699747	2021 MM_{5}	—	September 26, 2017	Haleakala	Pan-STARRS 1	KOR	1.0 km	MPC · JPL
699748	2021 MK_{10}	—	June 18, 2021	Haleakala	Pan-STARRS 1	V	500 m	MPC · JPL
699749	2021 MT_{12}	—	February 5, 2014	Kitt Peak	Spacewatch	·	1.3 km	MPC · JPL
699750	2021 MH_{16}	—	June 18, 2021	Haleakala	Pan-STARRS 1	MAR	660 m	MPC · JPL
699751	2021 MS_{16}	—	January 25, 2015	Haleakala	Pan-STARRS 1	·	1.7 km	MPC · JPL
699752	2021 NK_{10}	—	April 20, 2013	Kitt Peak	Spacewatch	·	970 m	MPC · JPL
699753	2021 NH_{16}	—	September 17, 2017	Haleakala	Pan-STARRS 1	·	1.3 km	MPC · JPL
699754	2021 NN_{16}	—	May 20, 2015	Cerro Tololo	DECam	·	1.7 km	MPC · JPL
699755	2021 NQ_{16}	—	April 17, 2009	Mauna Kea	P. A. Wiegert	·	840 m	MPC · JPL
699756	2021 NJ_{25}	—	October 15, 2014	Kitt Peak	Spacewatch	MAS	590 m	MPC · JPL
699757	2021 NE_{28}	—	February 20, 2009	Kitt Peak	Spacewatch	NYS	1.0 km	MPC · JPL
699758	2021 NT_{39}	—	July 7, 2021	Haleakala	Pan-STARRS 1	V	520 m	MPC · JPL
699759	2021 NP_{57}	—	August 24, 2017	Haleakala	Pan-STARRS 1	KON	1.6 km	MPC · JPL
699760	2021 NN_{58}	—	January 18, 2015	Haleakala	Pan-STARRS 1	·	1.4 km	MPC · JPL
699761	2021 OJ_{13}	—	July 16, 2021	Haleakala	Pan-STARRS 1	V	440 m	MPC · JPL
699762	2021 OM_{13}	—	May 21, 2006	Kitt Peak	Spacewatch	NYS	720 m	MPC · JPL
699763	2021 ON_{19}	—	July 18, 2021	Haleakala	Pan-STARRS 1	MAS	540 m	MPC · JPL
699764	2021 OV_{20}	—	February 15, 2015	Haleakala	Pan-STARRS 1	MAR	900 m	MPC · JPL
699765	2021 OO_{30}	—	April 20, 2009	Mount Lemmon	Mount Lemmon Survey	·	820 m	MPC · JPL
699766	2021 PJ_{9}	—	September 29, 2014	Haleakala	Pan-STARRS 1	·	740 m	MPC · JPL
699767	2021 PK_{14}	—	April 8, 2013	Mount Lemmon	Mount Lemmon Survey	NYS	670 m	MPC · JPL
699768	2021 PC_{20}	—	October 22, 2003	Kitt Peak	Deep Ecliptic Survey	·	820 m	MPC · JPL
699769	2021 PE_{29}	—	February 15, 2016	Mount Lemmon	Mount Lemmon Survey	MAS	600 m	MPC · JPL
699770	2021 PO_{38}	—	April 6, 2013	Mount Lemmon	Mount Lemmon Survey	·	710 m	MPC · JPL
699771	2021 PO_{44}	—	August 4, 2021	Haleakala	Pan-STARRS 1	MAR	730 m	MPC · JPL
699772	2021 PP_{48}	—	March 31, 2019	Mount Lemmon	Mount Lemmon Survey	EOS	1.4 km	MPC · JPL
699773	2021 PD_{66}	—	August 15, 2021	Haleakala	Pan-STARRS 1	EOS	1.3 km	MPC · JPL
699774	2021 PA_{67}	—	July 14, 2016	Haleakala	Pan-STARRS 1	·	1.3 km	MPC · JPL
699775	2021 PX_{75}	—	March 18, 2015	Haleakala	Pan-STARRS 1	AST	1.4 km	MPC · JPL
699776	2021 PF_{76}	—	March 15, 2012	Mount Lemmon	Mount Lemmon Survey	·	2.1 km	MPC · JPL
699777	2021 PQ_{81}	—	February 6, 2013	Kitt Peak	Spacewatch	·	700 m	MPC · JPL
699778	2021 PX_{82}	—	January 28, 2007	Kitt Peak	Spacewatch	EUN	990 m	MPC · JPL
699779	2021 PA_{83}	—	August 7, 2021	Haleakala	Pan-STARRS 1	·	880 m	MPC · JPL
699780	2021 PG_{99}	—	September 15, 2013	Mount Lemmon	Mount Lemmon Survey	·	990 m	MPC · JPL
699781	2021 PP_{99}	—	August 10, 2021	Haleakala	Pan-STARRS 1	MAR	720 m	MPC · JPL
699782	2021 PV_{101}	—	May 20, 2015	Cerro Tololo	DECam	KOR	1.0 km	MPC · JPL
699783	2021 PL_{108}	—	March 3, 2009	Kitt Peak	Spacewatch	·	880 m	MPC · JPL
699784	2021 PU_{109}	—	February 18, 2013	Mount Lemmon	Mount Lemmon Survey	·	2.2 km	MPC · JPL
699785	2021 PS_{127}	—	June 11, 2015	Haleakala	Pan-STARRS 1	KOR	990 m	MPC · JPL
699786	2021 PG_{135}	—	August 5, 2021	Haleakala	Pan-STARRS 1	TIR	2.1 km	MPC · JPL
699787	2021 PE_{152}	—	August 4, 2021	Haleakala	Pan-STARRS 1	·	1.4 km	MPC · JPL
699788	2021 PN_{153}	—	June 19, 2015	Haleakala	Pan-STARRS 1	AGN	840 m	MPC · JPL
699789	2021 PW_{209}	—	April 18, 2015	Cerro Tololo	DECam	·	1.3 km	MPC · JPL
699790	2021 QY_{6}	—	October 31, 2010	Mount Lemmon	Mount Lemmon Survey	·	880 m	MPC · JPL
699791	2021 QY_{7}	—	March 12, 2010	Mount Lemmon	Mount Lemmon Survey	·	550 m	MPC · JPL
699792	2021 QP_{25}	—	October 25, 2012	Mount Lemmon	Mount Lemmon Survey	AGN	870 m	MPC · JPL
699793	2021 QW_{25}	—	August 30, 2021	Haleakala	Pan-STARRS 1	·	1.0 km	MPC · JPL
699794	2021 QZ_{34}	—	August 28, 2021	Haleakala	Pan-STARRS 1	·	1.7 km	MPC · JPL
699795	2021 QM_{37}	—	August 30, 2021	Haleakala	Pan-STARRS 1	·	2.1 km	MPC · JPL
699796	2021 QT_{43}	—	November 17, 2014	Haleakala	Pan-STARRS 1	NYS	800 m	MPC · JPL
699797	2021 QW_{45}	—	January 25, 2006	Kitt Peak	Spacewatch	(5)	710 m	MPC · JPL
699798	2021 QL_{46}	—	August 18, 2021	Haleakala	Pan-STARRS 1	TIR	3.1 km	MPC · JPL
699799	2021 QP_{46}	—	July 25, 2017	Haleakala	Pan-STARRS 1	·	1.0 km	MPC · JPL
699800	2021 QD_{53}	—	November 21, 2017	Haleakala	Pan-STARRS 1	HOF	1.7 km	MPC · JPL

== 699801–699900 ==
back to top

Designation			Discovery			Properties		Ref
Permanent	Provisional	Named after	Date	Site	Discoverer(s)	Category	Diam.	Ref
699801	2021 QZ_{54}	—	March 21, 2015	Cerro Paranal	Altmann, M., Prusti, T.	·	1.1 km	MPC · JPL
699802	2021 QQ_{56}	—	August 18, 2021	Haleakala	Pan-STARRS 1	·	1.6 km	MPC · JPL
699803	2021 QL_{59}	—	April 23, 2014	Cerro Tololo	DECam	·	1.4 km	MPC · JPL
699804	2021 QC_{63}	—	August 31, 2021	Haleakala	Pan-STARRS 2	·	2.4 km	MPC · JPL
699805	2021 QC_{67}	—	August 17, 2021	Haleakala	Pan-STARRS 1	·	770 m	MPC · JPL
699806	2021 QQ_{80}	—	May 20, 2015	Cerro Tololo	DECam	·	1.5 km	MPC · JPL
699807	2021 QJ_{96}	—	August 30, 2021	Haleakala	Pan-STARRS 1	·	2.0 km	MPC · JPL
699808	2021 QE_{113}	—	October 22, 2012	Haleakala	Pan-STARRS 1	·	1.6 km	MPC · JPL
699809	2021 QA_{115}	—	August 17, 2021	Haleakala	Pan-STARRS 1	615	970 m	MPC · JPL
699810	2021 RA_{7}	—	October 14, 2015	Catalina	CSS	T_{j} (2.99) · EUP	3.0 km	MPC · JPL
699811	2021 RJ_{13}	—	June 18, 2015	Haleakala	Pan-STARRS 1	·	1.7 km	MPC · JPL
699812	2021 RB_{14}	—	October 10, 2012	Mount Lemmon	Mount Lemmon Survey	·	1.6 km	MPC · JPL
699813	2021 RB_{20}	—	September 6, 2015	Kitt Peak	Spacewatch	·	2.6 km	MPC · JPL
699814	2021 RH_{22}	—	October 1, 2008	Mount Lemmon	Mount Lemmon Survey	·	1.5 km	MPC · JPL
699815	2021 RA_{29}	—	April 18, 2015	Cerro Tololo	DECam	·	1.1 km	MPC · JPL
699816	2021 RY_{37}	—	February 24, 2006	Kitt Peak	Spacewatch	·	1.3 km	MPC · JPL
699817	2021 RD_{39}	—	July 13, 2016	Haleakala	Pan-STARRS 1	·	1.1 km	MPC · JPL
699818	2021 RO_{40}	—	October 8, 2016	Haleakala	Pan-STARRS 1	EOS	1.5 km	MPC · JPL
699819	2021 RV_{44}	—	August 3, 2016	Haleakala	Pan-STARRS 1	·	1.3 km	MPC · JPL
699820	2021 RG_{49}	—	October 11, 2012	Haleakala	Pan-STARRS 1	AGN	920 m	MPC · JPL
699821	2021 RO_{50}	—	September 15, 2021	Haleakala	Pan-STARRS 1	·	1.0 km	MPC · JPL
699822	2021 RO_{55}	—	February 17, 2007	Mount Lemmon	Mount Lemmon Survey	·	2.0 km	MPC · JPL
699823	2021 RR_{63}	—	January 14, 2018	Haleakala	Pan-STARRS 1	·	1.6 km	MPC · JPL
699824	2021 RF_{67}	—	July 14, 2016	Haleakala	Pan-STARRS 1	·	1.1 km	MPC · JPL
699825	2021 RH_{67}	—	October 9, 2007	Mount Lemmon	Mount Lemmon Survey	·	1.7 km	MPC · JPL
699826	2021 RM_{67}	—	October 18, 2012	Haleakala	Pan-STARRS 1	AGN	880 m	MPC · JPL
699827	2021 RX_{72}	—	June 11, 2015	Haleakala	Pan-STARRS 1	·	1.5 km	MPC · JPL
699828	2021 RB_{83}	—	May 2, 2016	Mount Lemmon	Mount Lemmon Survey	·	700 m	MPC · JPL
699829	2021 RX_{84}	—	September 9, 2021	Mount Lemmon	Mount Lemmon Survey	·	2.6 km	MPC · JPL
699830	2021 RS_{87}	—	September 4, 2021	Haleakala	Pan-STARRS 1	HOF	1.9 km	MPC · JPL
699831	2021 RA_{90}	—	April 13, 2011	Mount Lemmon	Mount Lemmon Survey	·	1.6 km	MPC · JPL
699832	2021 RK_{100}	—	February 16, 2015	Haleakala	Pan-STARRS 1	·	1.1 km	MPC · JPL
699833	2021 RH_{110}	—	September 9, 2021	Mount Lemmon	Mount Lemmon Survey	·	1.1 km	MPC · JPL
699834	2021 RP_{113}	—	October 18, 2012	Haleakala	Pan-STARRS 1	·	1.4 km	MPC · JPL
699835	2021 RN_{115}	—	May 25, 2015	Haleakala	Pan-STARRS 1	·	1.5 km	MPC · JPL
699836	2021 RU_{116}	—	September 11, 2016	Mount Lemmon	Mount Lemmon Survey	KOR	1.0 km	MPC · JPL
699837	2021 RF_{122}	—	June 11, 2015	Haleakala	Pan-STARRS 1	KOR	1.0 km	MPC · JPL
699838	2021 RP_{130}	—	January 14, 2018	Haleakala	Pan-STARRS 1	·	2.0 km	MPC · JPL
699839	2021 RT_{133}	—	October 7, 2008	Mount Lemmon	Mount Lemmon Survey	·	1.4 km	MPC · JPL
699840	2021 RP_{134}	—	April 28, 2014	Cerro Tololo	DECam	·	1.6 km	MPC · JPL
699841	2021 RS_{134}	—	September 8, 2021	Haleakala	Pan-STARRS 2	·	1.1 km	MPC · JPL
699842	2021 RT_{134}	—	September 8, 2021	Haleakala	Pan-STARRS 1	·	1.3 km	MPC · JPL
699843	2021 RE_{146}	—	August 21, 2015	Haleakala	Pan-STARRS 1	EOS	1.4 km	MPC · JPL
699844	2021 RK_{146}	—	September 15, 2010	Kitt Peak	Spacewatch	EOS	1.2 km	MPC · JPL
699845	2021 RM_{146}	—	September 4, 2021	Haleakala	Pan-STARRS 2	·	1.3 km	MPC · JPL
699846	2021 RD_{148}	—	October 7, 2007	Mount Lemmon	Mount Lemmon Survey	AGN	850 m	MPC · JPL
699847	2021 RS_{148}	—	August 28, 2016	Mount Lemmon	Mount Lemmon Survey	·	1.6 km	MPC · JPL
699848	2021 RJ_{150}	—	March 14, 2007	Kitt Peak	Spacewatch	·	1.1 km	MPC · JPL
699849	2021 RM_{151}	—	September 10, 2021	Haleakala	Pan-STARRS 1	·	1.9 km	MPC · JPL
699850	2021 RN_{153}	—	September 8, 2021	Haleakala	Pan-STARRS 2	·	1.9 km	MPC · JPL
699851	2021 RD_{176}	—	September 8, 2021	Haleakala	Pan-STARRS 1	·	1.2 km	MPC · JPL
699852	2021 RV_{176}	—	October 15, 2012	Haleakala	Pan-STARRS 1	·	1.4 km	MPC · JPL
699853	2021 RW_{176}	—	February 28, 2019	Mount Lemmon	Mount Lemmon Survey	AGN	770 m	MPC · JPL
699854	2021 RA_{177}	—	September 15, 2021	Haleakala	Pan-STARRS 2	EOS	1.2 km	MPC · JPL
699855	2021 RM_{185}	—	January 18, 2013	Mount Lemmon	Mount Lemmon Survey	·	1.2 km	MPC · JPL
699856	2021 RW_{204}	—	September 7, 2021	Haleakala	Pan-STARRS 1	·	1.5 km	MPC · JPL
699857	2021 RA_{209}	—	January 20, 2015	Haleakala	Pan-STARRS 1	·	750 m	MPC · JPL
699858	2021 RS_{240}	—	September 9, 2021	Mount Lemmon	Mount Lemmon Survey	·	2.2 km	MPC · JPL
699859	2021 RZ_{244}	—	December 21, 2014	Mount Lemmon	Mount Lemmon Survey	·	760 m	MPC · JPL
699860	2021 SX_{8}	—	July 23, 2015	Haleakala	Pan-STARRS 1	EOS	1.2 km	MPC · JPL
699861	2021 SQ_{10}	—	October 15, 2012	Haleakala	Pan-STARRS 1	·	1.4 km	MPC · JPL
699862	2021 SO_{13}	—	April 18, 2015	Cerro Tololo	DECam	·	1.1 km	MPC · JPL
699863	2021 SQ_{18}	—	October 5, 2012	Haleakala	Pan-STARRS 1	WIT	680 m	MPC · JPL
699864	2021 SR_{19}	—	December 24, 2016	Haleakala	Pan-STARRS 1	·	2.7 km	MPC · JPL
699865	2021 SJ_{27}	—	September 28, 2021	Haleakala	Pan-STARRS 2	·	1.7 km	MPC · JPL
699866	2021 SM_{27}	—	September 28, 2021	Haleakala	Pan-STARRS 2	·	2.1 km	MPC · JPL
699867	2021 SX_{27}	—	September 30, 2021	Haleakala	Pan-STARRS 2	·	2.4 km	MPC · JPL
699868	2021 SA_{32}	—	October 13, 2010	Bergisch Gladbach	W. Bickel	·	2.0 km	MPC · JPL
699869	2021 SD_{33}	—	May 20, 2015	Cerro Tololo	DECam	·	1.3 km	MPC · JPL
699870	2021 SG_{33}	—	May 20, 2015	Cerro Tololo	DECam	·	1.2 km	MPC · JPL
699871	2021 SE_{37}	—	October 11, 2007	Mount Lemmon	Mount Lemmon Survey	HOF	1.9 km	MPC · JPL
699872	2021 SC_{73}	—	November 17, 2011	Mount Lemmon	Mount Lemmon Survey	·	1.8 km	MPC · JPL
699873	2021 TE_{5}	—	January 8, 2011	Mount Lemmon	Mount Lemmon Survey	·	2.4 km	MPC · JPL
699874	2021 TG_{5}	—	January 23, 2006	Kitt Peak	Spacewatch	·	2.4 km	MPC · JPL
699875	2021 TT_{5}	—	January 8, 2019	Haleakala	Pan-STARRS 1	HNS	950 m	MPC · JPL
699876	2021 TM_{11}	—	September 23, 2015	Haleakala	Pan-STARRS 1	·	2.4 km	MPC · JPL
699877	2021 TD_{14}	—	October 17, 2010	Mount Lemmon	Mount Lemmon Survey	·	1.8 km	MPC · JPL
699878	2021 TR_{19}	—	November 14, 2012	Mount Lemmon	Mount Lemmon Survey	·	1.5 km	MPC · JPL
699879	2021 TR_{25}	—	February 3, 2009	Kitt Peak	Spacewatch	HOF	1.9 km	MPC · JPL
699880	2021 TM_{26}	—	October 18, 2012	Haleakala	Pan-STARRS 1	·	1.1 km	MPC · JPL
699881	2021 TY_{27}	—	March 14, 1997	Kitt Peak	Spacewatch	EUN	1.0 km	MPC · JPL
699882	2021 TY_{28}	—	October 3, 2021	Kitt Peak	Bok NEO Survey	·	1.5 km	MPC · JPL
699883	2021 TY_{31}	—	October 9, 2021	Mount Lemmon	Mount Lemmon Survey	·	1.4 km	MPC · JPL
699884	2021 TK_{32}	—	October 16, 2012	Mount Lemmon	Mount Lemmon Survey	·	1.4 km	MPC · JPL
699885	2021 TH_{33}	—	April 21, 2009	Kitt Peak	Spacewatch	·	860 m	MPC · JPL
699886	2021 TU_{34}	—	November 4, 2007	Kitt Peak	Spacewatch	·	1.3 km	MPC · JPL
699887	2021 TH_{36}	—	October 16, 2007	Mount Lemmon	Mount Lemmon Survey	·	1.6 km	MPC · JPL
699888	2021 TK_{36}	—	September 14, 2007	Mount Lemmon	Mount Lemmon Survey	·	1.5 km	MPC · JPL
699889	2021 TL_{41}	—	October 28, 2011	Mount Lemmon	Mount Lemmon Survey	EOS	1.3 km	MPC · JPL
699890	2021 TY_{44}	—	October 4, 2021	Haleakala	Pan-STARRS 1	·	2.5 km	MPC · JPL
699891	2021 TV_{55}	—	October 16, 2012	Mount Lemmon	Mount Lemmon Survey	·	1.4 km	MPC · JPL
699892	2021 TY_{56}	—	April 29, 2011	Kitt Peak	Spacewatch	·	1.0 km	MPC · JPL
699893	2021 TP_{58}	—	May 26, 2019	Haleakala	Pan-STARRS 1	·	2.2 km	MPC · JPL
699894	2021 TT_{60}	—	November 23, 2016	Mount Lemmon	Mount Lemmon Survey	·	1.4 km	MPC · JPL
699895	2021 TB_{62}	—	March 17, 2018	Haleakala	Pan-STARRS 1	·	2.4 km	MPC · JPL
699896	2021 TY_{62}	—	April 18, 2013	Mount Lemmon	Mount Lemmon Survey	·	2.0 km	MPC · JPL
699897	2021 TA_{63}	—	May 25, 2019	Haleakala	Pan-STARRS 1	·	2.7 km	MPC · JPL
699898	2021 TU_{64}	—	October 17, 2010	Mount Lemmon	Mount Lemmon Survey	·	2.3 km	MPC · JPL
699899	2021 TS_{68}	—	May 5, 2014	Mount Lemmon	Mount Lemmon Survey	·	1.6 km	MPC · JPL
699900	2021 TN_{70}	—	March 31, 2013	Mount Lemmon	Mount Lemmon Survey	·	2.2 km	MPC · JPL

== 699901–700000 ==
back to top

Designation			Discovery			Properties		Ref
Permanent	Provisional	Named after	Date	Site	Discoverer(s)	Category	Diam.	Ref
699901	2021 TS_{70}	—	February 28, 2014	Haleakala	Pan-STARRS 1	L4	6.9 km	MPC · JPL
699902	2021 TS_{78}	—	October 10, 2007	Mount Lemmon	Mount Lemmon Survey	HOF	1.9 km	MPC · JPL
699903	2021 TV_{85}	—	October 4, 2021	Haleakala	Pan-STARRS 2	·	1.2 km	MPC · JPL
699904	2021 TP_{88}	—	October 14, 2021	Haleakala	Pan-STARRS 1	·	1.3 km	MPC · JPL
699905	2021 TP_{101}	—	October 13, 2021	Haleakala	Pan-STARRS 2	·	1.8 km	MPC · JPL
699906	2021 TJ_{109}	—	April 28, 2014	Cerro Tololo	DECam	EOS	1.3 km	MPC · JPL
699907	2021 TF_{113}	—	October 3, 2021	Haleakala	Pan-STARRS 1	·	1.4 km	MPC · JPL
699908	2021 TJ_{114}	—	May 23, 2014	Haleakala	Pan-STARRS 1	·	1.3 km	MPC · JPL
699909	2021 TN_{137}	—	May 5, 2014	Cerro Tololo	DECam	·	1.2 km	MPC · JPL
699910	2021 TD_{138}	—	October 2, 2021	Kitt Peak	Bok NEO Survey	·	1.4 km	MPC · JPL
699911	2021 TP_{138}	—	January 10, 2013	Haleakala	Pan-STARRS 1	EOS	1.3 km	MPC · JPL
699912	2021 TW_{138}	—	July 18, 2020	Haleakala	Pan-STARRS 1	·	1.9 km	MPC · JPL
699913	2021 TU_{141}	—	May 20, 2015	Haleakala	Pan-STARRS 1	·	1.5 km	MPC · JPL
699914	2021 TW_{141}	—	October 3, 2021	Haleakala	Pan-STARRS 1	·	2.0 km	MPC · JPL
699915	2021 TG_{143}	—	November 12, 2005	Kitt Peak	Spacewatch	·	1.9 km	MPC · JPL
699916	2021 TG_{158}	—	May 4, 2014	Haleakala	Pan-STARRS 1	·	1.8 km	MPC · JPL
699917	2021 UY_{14}	—	October 28, 2021	Haleakala	Pan-STARRS 2	·	1.6 km	MPC · JPL
699918	2021 UH_{15}	—	April 5, 2014	Haleakala	Pan-STARRS 1	·	1.4 km	MPC · JPL
699919	2021 UL_{18}	—	April 1, 2009	Kitt Peak	Spacewatch	·	1.2 km	MPC · JPL
699920	2021 UG_{21}	—	April 21, 2020	Haleakala	Pan-STARRS 1	·	760 m	MPC · JPL
699921	2021 UJ_{21}	—	October 28, 2008	Kitt Peak	Spacewatch	·	1.1 km	MPC · JPL
699922	2021 UU_{22}	—	March 17, 2018	Haleakala	Pan-STARRS 1	·	2.0 km	MPC · JPL
699923	2021 UV_{23}	—	October 6, 2016	Haleakala	Pan-STARRS 1	KOR	920 m	MPC · JPL
699924	2021 UL_{25}	—	January 9, 2014	Kitt Peak	Spacewatch	·	1.3 km	MPC · JPL
699925	2021 UK_{30}	—	April 2, 2019	Haleakala	Pan-STARRS 1	·	1.3 km	MPC · JPL
699926	2021 UM_{31}	—	October 31, 2021	Haleakala	Pan-STARRS 1	·	1.9 km	MPC · JPL
699927	2021 UB_{36}	—	September 20, 2011	Mount Lemmon	Mount Lemmon Survey	KOR	1.0 km	MPC · JPL
699928	2021 UF_{36}	—	April 28, 2014	Haleakala	Pan-STARRS 1	KOR	980 m	MPC · JPL
699929	2021 UQ_{37}	—	October 8, 2007	Kitt Peak	Spacewatch	AGN	880 m	MPC · JPL
699930	2021 UD_{40}	—	April 13, 2019	Mount Lemmon	Mount Lemmon Survey	·	1.5 km	MPC · JPL
699931	2021 UD_{43}	—	April 3, 2008	Mount Lemmon	Mount Lemmon Survey	EOS	1.5 km	MPC · JPL
699932	2021 UQ_{47}	—	October 26, 2011	Haleakala	Pan-STARRS 1	·	1.7 km	MPC · JPL
699933	2021 UG_{50}	—	October 28, 2021	Mount Lemmon	Mount Lemmon Survey	·	1.3 km	MPC · JPL
699934	2021 UA_{54}	—	September 28, 2003	Kitt Peak	Spacewatch	·	1.3 km	MPC · JPL
699935	2021 UR_{56}	—	September 10, 2015	Haleakala	Pan-STARRS 1	·	2.3 km	MPC · JPL
699936	2021 UR_{69}	—	October 29, 2021	Haleakala	Pan-STARRS 1	·	1.3 km	MPC · JPL
699937	2021 UG_{90}	—	October 28, 2021	Kitt Peak	Bok NEO Survey	·	1.9 km	MPC · JPL
699938	2021 UY_{106}	—	October 19, 2015	Haleakala	Pan-STARRS 1	VER	1.8 km	MPC · JPL
699939	2021 VZ	—	February 26, 2014	Haleakala	Pan-STARRS 1	L4	6.8 km	MPC · JPL
699940	2021 VF_{9}	—	November 27, 2010	Mount Lemmon	Mount Lemmon Survey	VER	2.1 km	MPC · JPL
699941	2021 VJ_{14}	—	December 17, 2007	Mount Lemmon	Mount Lemmon Survey	3:2	5.3 km	MPC · JPL
699942	2021 VD_{16}	—	November 12, 2010	Mount Lemmon	Mount Lemmon Survey	·	2.0 km	MPC · JPL
699943	2021 VC_{18}	—	February 26, 2014	Mount Lemmon	Mount Lemmon Survey	·	1.7 km	MPC · JPL
699944	2021 VV_{19}	—	October 2, 2016	Haleakala	Pan-STARRS 1	·	1.5 km	MPC · JPL
699945	2021 VO_{28}	—	August 26, 2016	Haleakala	Pan-STARRS 1	·	1.0 km	MPC · JPL
699946	2021 VU_{29}	—	November 7, 2021	Haleakala	Pan-STARRS 2	VER	2.0 km	MPC · JPL
699947	2021 VQ_{46}	—	July 25, 2020	Haleakala	Pan-STARRS 1	·	1.3 km	MPC · JPL
699948	2021 VA_{56}	—	April 13, 2013	Haleakala	Pan-STARRS 1	·	2.0 km	MPC · JPL
699949	2021 VA_{67}	—	September 12, 2015	Haleakala	Pan-STARRS 1	·	2.2 km	MPC · JPL
699950	2021 VD_{67}	—	November 20, 2015	Mount Lemmon	Mount Lemmon Survey	·	2.8 km	MPC · JPL
699951	2021 VC_{75}	—	February 27, 2012	Haleakala	Pan-STARRS 1	·	2.3 km	MPC · JPL
699952	2021 VR_{76}	—	March 10, 2018	Haleakala	Pan-STARRS 1	VER	1.9 km	MPC · JPL
699953	2021 VD_{97}	—	November 1, 2021	Haleakala	Pan-STARRS 2	SYL	2.6 km	MPC · JPL
699954	2021 WN_{11}	—	March 25, 2012	Mount Lemmon	Mount Lemmon Survey	·	2.3 km	MPC · JPL
699955	2021 WV_{12}	—	November 26, 2021	Haleakala	Pan-STARRS 1	·	2.3 km	MPC · JPL
699956	2022 BL_{25}	—	April 21, 2004	Kitt Peak	Spacewatch	NYS	1.2 km	MPC · JPL
699957	2022 BD_{32}	—	September 16, 2009	Kitt Peak	Spacewatch	·	1.6 km	MPC · JPL
699958	2022 DW_{10}	—	November 19, 1995	Kitt Peak	Spacewatch	·	970 m	MPC · JPL
699959	2022 DL_{21}	—	January 1, 2014	Haleakala	Pan-STARRS 1	·	1.0 km	MPC · JPL
699960	2022 EZ_{21}	—	March 1, 2022	Haleakala	Pan-STARRS 2	·	1.2 km	MPC · JPL
699961	2022 HM_{10}	—	April 29, 2022	Haleakala	Pan-STARRS 2	·	910 m	MPC · JPL
699962	2022 HG_{11}	—	April 29, 2022	Haleakala	Pan-STARRS 2	·	1.1 km	MPC · JPL
699963	2022 KL_{10}	—	August 15, 2013	Haleakala	Pan-STARRS 1	·	1.5 km	MPC · JPL
699964	2022 PT_{29}	—	September 28, 2011	Mount Lemmon	Mount Lemmon Survey	·	2.1 km	MPC · JPL
699965	2022 QM_{5}	—	July 28, 2019	Palomar	Zwicky Transient Facility	H	450 m	MPC · JPL
699966	2022 QA_{6}	—	August 19, 2022	Haleakala	Pan-STARRS 2	H	390 m	MPC · JPL
699967	2022 QX_{128}	—	April 24, 2014	Cerro Tololo	DECam	V	400 m	MPC · JPL
699968	2022 RD_{64}	—	December 29, 2014	Haleakala	Pan-STARRS 1	WIT	630 m	MPC · JPL
699969	2022 SU_{133}	—	September 29, 2022	Haleakala	Pan-STARRS 2	·	2.0 km	MPC · JPL
699970	2022 SS_{134}	—	January 22, 2015	Haleakala	Pan-STARRS 1	·	1.1 km	MPC · JPL
699971	2022 SV_{162}	—	September 24, 2022	Haleakala	Pan-STARRS 1	EUN	760 m	MPC · JPL
699972	2022 SR_{289}	—	September 22, 2022	Haleakala	Pan-STARRS 2	·	1.4 km	MPC · JPL
699973	2022 SY_{311}	—	February 23, 2011	Catalina	CSS	·	1.1 km	MPC · JPL
699974	2022 UU_{5}	—	November 14, 2010	Mount Lemmon	Mount Lemmon Survey	·	890 m	MPC · JPL
699975	2022 UL_{17}	—	April 28, 2014	Cerro Tololo	DECam	·	2.0 km	MPC · JPL
699976	2022 UG_{22}	—	January 29, 2011	Mount Lemmon	Mount Lemmon Survey	·	1.0 km	MPC · JPL
699977	2022 UH_{46}	—	September 1, 2017	Haleakala	Pan-STARRS 1	·	1.5 km	MPC · JPL
699978	2022 UL_{54}	—	February 8, 2011	Mount Lemmon	Mount Lemmon Survey	·	1.0 km	MPC · JPL
699979	2022 UC_{61}	—	December 21, 2014	Haleakala	Pan-STARRS 1	·	1.0 km	MPC · JPL
699980	2022 UA_{74}	—	October 20, 2011	Mount Lemmon	Mount Lemmon Survey	·	2.4 km	MPC · JPL
699981	2022 UW_{76}	—	October 21, 2022	Haleakala	Pan-STARRS 2	·	1.4 km	MPC · JPL
699982	2022 UX_{76}	—	September 24, 2017	Haleakala	Pan-STARRS 1	KOR	990 m	MPC · JPL
699983	2022 UT_{87}	—	October 23, 2022	Haleakala	Pan-STARRS 1	·	2.4 km	MPC · JPL
699984	2022 UY_{93}	—	October 31, 2022	Haleakala	Pan-STARRS 2	·	1.6 km	MPC · JPL
699985	2022 UH_{105}	—	September 13, 2021	Haleakala	Pan-STARRS 1	·	2.0 km	MPC · JPL
699986	2022 UW_{119}	—	April 23, 2014	Cerro Tololo	DECam	·	1.8 km	MPC · JPL
699987	2022 UY_{151}	—	April 23, 2014	Cerro Tololo	DECam	·	1.6 km	MPC · JPL
699988	2022 VX_{3}	—	November 1, 2022	Haleakala	Pan-STARRS 2	·	2.1 km	MPC · JPL
699989	2022 VY_{7}	—	September 16, 2017	Haleakala	Pan-STARRS 1	·	1.1 km	MPC · JPL
699990	2022 WF_{18}	—	November 20, 2014	Haleakala	Pan-STARRS 1	·	810 m	MPC · JPL
699991	2023 AG_{3}	—	January 20, 2018	Haleakala	Pan-STARRS 1	·	1.9 km	MPC · JPL
699992	1992 WQ_{10}	—	January 27, 2006	Kitt Peak	Spacewatch	·	1.0 km	MPC · JPL
699993	1993 BK_{10}	—	January 22, 1993	Kitt Peak	Spacewatch	·	610 m	MPC · JPL
699994	1993 BF_{12}	—	January 26, 1993	Kitt Peak	Spacewatch	·	530 m	MPC · JPL
699995	1993 HF_{2}	—	March 18, 2010	Mauna Kea	P. A. Wiegert	EUN	850 m	MPC · JPL
699996	1993 VQ_{6}	—	November 9, 1993	Kitt Peak	Spacewatch	·	2.2 km	MPC · JPL
699997	1993 XN_{3}	—	July 25, 2014	Haleakala	Pan-STARRS 1	ERI	1.3 km	MPC · JPL
699998	1994 TA_{18}	—	August 9, 2013	Kitt Peak	Spacewatch	·	1.0 km	MPC · JPL
699999	1994 UR_{3}	—	October 26, 1994	Kitt Peak	Spacewatch	·	1.5 km	MPC · JPL
700000	1994 UX_{10}	—	October 29, 1994	Kitt Peak	Spacewatch	·	1.2 km	MPC · JPL

back to top
