= List of minor planets: 692001–693000 =

The following is a partial list of minor planets, running from minor-planet number 692001 through 693000, inclusive. The primary data for this and other partial lists is based on JPL's "Small-Body Orbital Elements" and data available from the Minor Planet Center. Critical list information is also provided by the MPC, unless otherwise specified from Lowell Observatory. A detailed description of the table's columns and additional sources are given on the main page including a complete list of every page in this series, and a statistical break-up on the dynamical classification of minor planets.

Also see the summary list of all named bodies in numerical and alphabetical order, and the corresponding naming citations for the number range of this particular list. New namings may only be added to this list after official publication, as the preannouncement of names is condemned by the Working Group for Small Bodies Nomenclature of the International Astronomical Union.

Near-Earth obj.	MBA (inner)	MBA (outer)	Centaur
Mars-crosser	MBA (middle)	Jupiter trojan	Trans-Neptunian obj.
Unclassified

== 692001–692100 ==
Designation			Discovery			Properties		Ref
Permanent	Provisional	Named after	Date	Site	Discoverer(s)	Category	Diam.	Ref
692001	2014 SP_{227}	—	July 28, 2008	Mount Lemmon	Mount Lemmon Survey	THB	2.2 km	MPC · JPL
692002	2014 SZ_{227}	—	September 30, 2003	Kitt Peak	Spacewatch	·	2.3 km	MPC · JPL
692003	2014 SX_{230}	—	April 20, 2007	Kitt Peak	Spacewatch	·	2.1 km	MPC · JPL
692004	2014 SC_{232}	—	November 20, 2009	Kitt Peak	Spacewatch	·	2.4 km	MPC · JPL
692005	2014 SO_{233}	—	September 23, 2011	Kitt Peak	Spacewatch	·	1.0 km	MPC · JPL
692006	2014 SN_{234}	—	August 9, 2008	La Sagra	OAM	·	3.3 km	MPC · JPL
692007	2014 SR_{234}	—	March 19, 2013	Palomar	Palomar Transient Factory	·	2.2 km	MPC · JPL
692008	2014 SU_{234}	—	December 26, 2005	Mount Lemmon	Mount Lemmon Survey	·	1.4 km	MPC · JPL
692009	2014 SV_{234}	—	August 27, 2014	Haleakala	Pan-STARRS 1	·	2.4 km	MPC · JPL
692010	2014 SV_{239}	—	August 26, 2014	Haleakala	Pan-STARRS 1	·	2.4 km	MPC · JPL
692011	2014 SZ_{239}	—	March 14, 2013	Mount Lemmon	Mount Lemmon Survey	·	2.7 km	MPC · JPL
692012	2014 SW_{240}	—	January 4, 2012	Mount Lemmon	Mount Lemmon Survey	·	1.1 km	MPC · JPL
692013	2014 SD_{241}	—	April 15, 2013	Haleakala	Pan-STARRS 1	·	1.6 km	MPC · JPL
692014	2014 SQ_{241}	—	July 31, 2014	Haleakala	Pan-STARRS 1	·	2.7 km	MPC · JPL
692015	2014 SK_{242}	—	August 30, 2014	Haleakala	Pan-STARRS 1	·	2.8 km	MPC · JPL
692016	2014 SE_{243}	—	September 30, 2003	Apache Point	SDSS Collaboration	·	2.3 km	MPC · JPL
692017	2014 ST_{244}	—	July 31, 2014	Haleakala	Pan-STARRS 1	·	630 m	MPC · JPL
692018	2014 SP_{248}	—	August 27, 2014	Haleakala	Pan-STARRS 1	·	2.5 km	MPC · JPL
692019	2014 SB_{249}	—	November 16, 2009	Kitt Peak	Spacewatch	·	2.9 km	MPC · JPL
692020	2014 SL_{249}	—	September 22, 2014	Haleakala	Pan-STARRS 1	·	800 m	MPC · JPL
692021	2014 SY_{249}	—	March 25, 2012	Mount Lemmon	Mount Lemmon Survey	·	2.2 km	MPC · JPL
692022	2014 SR_{256}	—	September 2, 2014	Haleakala	Pan-STARRS 1	LIX	2.8 km	MPC · JPL
692023	2014 SA_{259}	—	August 25, 2003	Palomar	NEAT	·	2.0 km	MPC · JPL
692024	2014 SN_{263}	—	July 27, 2014	Haleakala	Pan-STARRS 1	·	1.2 km	MPC · JPL
692025	2014 SQ_{264}	—	March 24, 2006	Kitt Peak	Spacewatch	·	3.2 km	MPC · JPL
692026	2014 SM_{267}	—	April 1, 2012	Mount Lemmon	Mount Lemmon Survey	·	2.8 km	MPC · JPL
692027	2014 SW_{268}	—	August 30, 2014	Kitt Peak	Spacewatch	·	2.5 km	MPC · JPL
692028	2014 SU_{270}	—	January 11, 2008	Kitt Peak	Spacewatch	NYS	790 m	MPC · JPL
692029	2014 SE_{274}	—	September 15, 2014	Mount Lemmon	Mount Lemmon Survey	NYS	760 m	MPC · JPL
692030	2014 SW_{275}	—	September 27, 2003	Kitt Peak	Spacewatch	·	2.7 km	MPC · JPL
692031	2014 SS_{277}	—	August 27, 2014	Haleakala	Pan-STARRS 1	·	2.6 km	MPC · JPL
692032	2014 SU_{277}	—	October 18, 2003	Apache Point	SDSS Collaboration	·	2.4 km	MPC · JPL
692033	2014 SK_{283}	—	July 27, 2014	Haleakala	Pan-STARRS 1	·	800 m	MPC · JPL
692034	2014 SA_{284}	—	November 28, 1997	Kitt Peak	Spacewatch	·	2.7 km	MPC · JPL
692035	2014 SJ_{291}	—	February 28, 2012	Haleakala	Pan-STARRS 1	·	3.0 km	MPC · JPL
692036	2014 SZ_{294}	—	October 23, 2009	Kitt Peak	Spacewatch	·	2.6 km	MPC · JPL
692037	2014 SL_{295}	—	September 25, 2014	Mount Lemmon	Mount Lemmon Survey	·	2.2 km	MPC · JPL
692038	2014 SE_{297}	—	October 3, 2003	Kitt Peak	Spacewatch	·	2.2 km	MPC · JPL
692039	2014 SD_{302}	—	June 30, 2008	Kitt Peak	Spacewatch	URS	3.7 km	MPC · JPL
692040	2014 SL_{302}	—	September 4, 2014	Haleakala	Pan-STARRS 1	VER	2.4 km	MPC · JPL
692041	2014 SM_{302}	—	June 4, 2013	Mount Lemmon	Mount Lemmon Survey	·	2.2 km	MPC · JPL
692042	2014 SQ_{303}	—	August 6, 2014	Haleakala	Pan-STARRS 1	H	320 m	MPC · JPL
692043	2014 SQ_{304}	—	March 26, 2007	Kitt Peak	Spacewatch	·	2.6 km	MPC · JPL
692044	2014 SH_{306}	—	September 19, 2014	Haleakala	Pan-STARRS 1	·	2.4 km	MPC · JPL
692045	2014 SO_{308}	—	March 15, 2007	Mount Lemmon	Mount Lemmon Survey	·	2.3 km	MPC · JPL
692046	2014 SR_{308}	—	July 31, 2014	Haleakala	Pan-STARRS 1	·	2.6 km	MPC · JPL
692047	2014 SW_{308}	—	September 24, 2014	Mount Lemmon	Mount Lemmon Survey	·	860 m	MPC · JPL
692048	2014 SZ_{308}	—	October 21, 2003	Kitt Peak	Spacewatch	·	2.6 km	MPC · JPL
692049	2014 SK_{309}	—	August 31, 2014	Haleakala	Pan-STARRS 1	·	850 m	MPC · JPL
692050	2014 SW_{311}	—	May 15, 2013	Haleakala	Pan-STARRS 1	LIX	3.3 km	MPC · JPL
692051	2014 SK_{312}	—	August 2, 2008	Siding Spring	SSS	THB	2.5 km	MPC · JPL
692052	2014 SR_{313}	—	September 26, 2014	Kitt Peak	Spacewatch	·	2.6 km	MPC · JPL
692053	2014 SS_{313}	—	September 26, 2014	Kitt Peak	Spacewatch	·	2.7 km	MPC · JPL
692054	2014 SR_{314}	—	October 26, 2009	Kitt Peak	Spacewatch	·	1.4 km	MPC · JPL
692055	2014 SD_{318}	—	August 18, 2009	Kitt Peak	Spacewatch	·	1.4 km	MPC · JPL
692056	2014 SP_{322}	—	December 24, 2006	Kitt Peak	Spacewatch	·	1.9 km	MPC · JPL
692057	2014 ST_{322}	—	August 6, 2014	Haleakala	Pan-STARRS 1	·	660 m	MPC · JPL
692058	2014 SC_{323}	—	September 23, 2014	ESA OGS	ESA OGS	·	1.1 km	MPC · JPL
692059	2014 SG_{323}	—	October 18, 2011	Kitt Peak	Spacewatch	·	630 m	MPC · JPL
692060	2014 SX_{324}	—	August 27, 2014	Haleakala	Pan-STARRS 1	·	2.1 km	MPC · JPL
692061	2014 SF_{326}	—	September 26, 2014	Kitt Peak	Spacewatch	·	2.6 km	MPC · JPL
692062	2014 SF_{328}	—	September 26, 2014	Kitt Peak	Spacewatch	AEO	800 m	MPC · JPL
692063	2014 SM_{332}	—	August 15, 2009	Kitt Peak	Spacewatch	·	1.6 km	MPC · JPL
692064	2014 SW_{338}	—	October 20, 2003	Palomar	NEAT	TIR	2.4 km	MPC · JPL
692065	2014 SU_{341}	—	April 15, 2012	Haleakala	Pan-STARRS 1	·	2.3 km	MPC · JPL
692066	2014 SM_{347}	—	September 26, 2014	Kitt Peak	Spacewatch	HYG	2.2 km	MPC · JPL
692067	2014 SZ_{347}	—	October 18, 2003	Apache Point	SDSS Collaboration	H	430 m	MPC · JPL
692068	2014 SH_{351}	—	August 28, 2011	Haleakala	Pan-STARRS 1	H	390 m	MPC · JPL
692069	2014 SY_{351}	—	September 20, 2014	Haleakala	Pan-STARRS 1	H	350 m	MPC · JPL
692070	2014 SM_{352}	—	August 30, 2002	Palomar	NEAT	·	2.4 km	MPC · JPL
692071	2014 SL_{353}	—	May 14, 2008	Mount Lemmon	Mount Lemmon Survey	·	1.8 km	MPC · JPL
692072	2014 SF_{354}	—	August 10, 2007	Kitt Peak	Spacewatch	·	3.2 km	MPC · JPL
692073	2014 SV_{355}	—	November 18, 2003	Kitt Peak	Spacewatch	·	2.6 km	MPC · JPL
692074	2014 SX_{355}	—	February 24, 2012	Kitt Peak	Spacewatch	·	2.3 km	MPC · JPL
692075	2014 SC_{356}	—	September 21, 2003	Kitt Peak	Spacewatch	·	2.1 km	MPC · JPL
692076	2014 SL_{356}	—	October 22, 2003	Kitt Peak	Spacewatch	·	2.2 km	MPC · JPL
692077	2014 SR_{356}	—	September 30, 2003	Kitt Peak	Spacewatch	·	2.5 km	MPC · JPL
692078	2014 SS_{356}	—	September 27, 2003	Kitt Peak	Spacewatch	·	920 m	MPC · JPL
692079	2014 SU_{359}	—	August 28, 2009	Kitt Peak	Spacewatch	KOR	1.1 km	MPC · JPL
692080	2014 SE_{361}	—	September 20, 2014	Haleakala	Pan-STARRS 1	·	1.1 km	MPC · JPL
692081	2014 SL_{362}	—	February 8, 2011	Mount Lemmon	Mount Lemmon Survey	EOS	1.6 km	MPC · JPL
692082	2014 SN_{367}	—	September 25, 2014	Mount Lemmon	Mount Lemmon Survey	·	2.3 km	MPC · JPL
692083	2014 SP_{377}	—	June 25, 2017	Haleakala	Pan-STARRS 1	·	1.0 km	MPC · JPL
692084	2014 SR_{385}	—	September 20, 2014	Haleakala	Pan-STARRS 1	·	820 m	MPC · JPL
692085	2014 SP_{386}	—	September 19, 2014	Haleakala	Pan-STARRS 1	·	3.0 km	MPC · JPL
692086	2014 SU_{393}	—	September 22, 2014	Haleakala	Pan-STARRS 1	·	2.6 km	MPC · JPL
692087	2014 SQ_{397}	—	September 25, 2014	Kitt Peak	Spacewatch	·	2.1 km	MPC · JPL
692088	2014 SS_{397}	—	September 19, 2014	Haleakala	Pan-STARRS 1	·	980 m	MPC · JPL
692089	2014 SD_{401}	—	September 23, 2014	Mount Lemmon	Mount Lemmon Survey	·	950 m	MPC · JPL
692090	2014 SN_{401}	—	September 22, 2014	Kitt Peak	Spacewatch	·	1.1 km	MPC · JPL
692091	2014 SY_{401}	—	October 11, 2007	Kitt Peak	Spacewatch	·	820 m	MPC · JPL
692092	2014 SZ_{419}	—	September 22, 2014	Kitt Peak	Spacewatch	·	1.5 km	MPC · JPL
692093	2014 TK_{7}	—	September 24, 2008	Mount Lemmon	Mount Lemmon Survey	THM	2.1 km	MPC · JPL
692094	2014 TU_{7}	—	October 1, 2014	Kitt Peak	Spacewatch	·	2.6 km	MPC · JPL
692095	2014 TN_{12}	—	February 27, 2012	Haleakala	Pan-STARRS 1	·	2.2 km	MPC · JPL
692096	2014 TX_{12}	—	September 28, 2008	Mount Lemmon	Mount Lemmon Survey	·	2.5 km	MPC · JPL
692097	2014 TZ_{14}	—	October 1, 2014	Haleakala	Pan-STARRS 1	·	880 m	MPC · JPL
692098	2014 TA_{18}	—	November 19, 2009	Kitt Peak	Spacewatch	H	540 m	MPC · JPL
692099	2014 TR_{18}	—	October 1, 2003	Kitt Peak	Spacewatch	·	2.6 km	MPC · JPL
692100	2014 TR_{20}	—	May 15, 2012	Mount Lemmon	Mount Lemmon Survey	·	2.7 km	MPC · JPL

== 692101–692200 ==
back to top

Designation			Discovery			Properties		Ref
Permanent	Provisional	Named after	Date	Site	Discoverer(s)	Category	Diam.	Ref
692101	2014 TJ_{21}	—	September 23, 2014	Mount Lemmon	Mount Lemmon Survey	·	2.8 km	MPC · JPL
692102	2014 TY_{21}	—	October 1, 2014	Kitt Peak	Spacewatch	·	1.7 km	MPC · JPL
692103	2014 TM_{22}	—	September 23, 2014	Kitt Peak	Spacewatch	NYS	790 m	MPC · JPL
692104	2014 TV_{25}	—	December 28, 2005	Kitt Peak	Spacewatch	KOR	1.2 km	MPC · JPL
692105	2014 TL_{26}	—	October 16, 2003	Kitt Peak	Spacewatch	·	2.4 km	MPC · JPL
692106	2014 TK_{28}	—	October 23, 2003	Kitt Peak	Spacewatch	·	2.2 km	MPC · JPL
692107	2014 TO_{39}	—	September 2, 2014	Haleakala	Pan-STARRS 1	MAS	600 m	MPC · JPL
692108	2014 TV_{40}	—	September 2, 2014	Haleakala	Pan-STARRS 1	NYS	840 m	MPC · JPL
692109	2014 TP_{41}	—	October 17, 2010	Mount Lemmon	Mount Lemmon Survey	·	760 m	MPC · JPL
692110	2014 TB_{42}	—	October 24, 2005	Mauna Kea	A. Boattini	KOR	1.3 km	MPC · JPL
692111	2014 TC_{50}	—	March 30, 2012	Mount Lemmon	Mount Lemmon Survey	·	2.5 km	MPC · JPL
692112	2014 TX_{50}	—	September 21, 2009	Kitt Peak	Spacewatch	·	2.1 km	MPC · JPL
692113	2014 TV_{51}	—	November 9, 2009	Mount Lemmon	Mount Lemmon Survey	·	2.3 km	MPC · JPL
692114	2014 TZ_{52}	—	October 1, 2014	Haleakala	Pan-STARRS 1	·	2.2 km	MPC · JPL
692115	2014 TV_{55}	—	October 1, 2003	Kitt Peak	Spacewatch	·	1.9 km	MPC · JPL
692116	2014 TG_{63}	—	October 12, 2010	Kitt Peak	Spacewatch	·	1.4 km	MPC · JPL
692117	2014 TD_{64}	—	November 9, 1999	Kitt Peak	Spacewatch	·	980 m	MPC · JPL
692118	2014 TZ_{66}	—	October 14, 2014	Kitt Peak	Spacewatch	MAS	690 m	MPC · JPL
692119	2014 TK_{67}	—	September 6, 2008	Catalina	CSS	·	2.7 km	MPC · JPL
692120	2014 TO_{67}	—	October 17, 2009	Mount Lemmon	Mount Lemmon Survey	·	2.8 km	MPC · JPL
692121	2014 TX_{67}	—	September 9, 2008	Mount Lemmon	Mount Lemmon Survey	·	2.6 km	MPC · JPL
692122	2014 TZ_{67}	—	September 21, 2008	Mount Lemmon	Mount Lemmon Survey	·	2.6 km	MPC · JPL
692123	2014 TP_{68}	—	September 21, 2003	Kitt Peak	Spacewatch	·	2.3 km	MPC · JPL
692124	2014 TO_{73}	—	April 26, 2006	Mount Lemmon	Mount Lemmon Survey	·	2.1 km	MPC · JPL
692125	2014 TF_{76}	—	May 12, 2013	Mount Lemmon	Mount Lemmon Survey	·	2.2 km	MPC · JPL
692126	2014 TP_{79}	—	October 1, 2014	Haleakala	Pan-STARRS 1	·	1.7 km	MPC · JPL
692127	2014 TZ_{79}	—	November 30, 2003	Kitt Peak	Spacewatch	·	2.1 km	MPC · JPL
692128	2014 TG_{81}	—	December 1, 2003	Kitt Peak	Spacewatch	·	1.1 km	MPC · JPL
692129	2014 TQ_{82}	—	August 30, 2014	Haleakala	Pan-STARRS 1	·	3.1 km	MPC · JPL
692130	2014 TK_{83}	—	February 10, 2008	Kitt Peak	Spacewatch	·	1.0 km	MPC · JPL
692131	2014 TU_{87}	—	August 19, 2010	Kitt Peak	Spacewatch	·	1.0 km	MPC · JPL
692132	2014 TV_{87}	—	December 2, 2005	Mount Lemmon	Mount Lemmon Survey	·	2.0 km	MPC · JPL
692133	2014 TS_{90}	—	September 23, 2008	Mount Lemmon	Mount Lemmon Survey	(1298)	2.0 km	MPC · JPL
692134	2014 TT_{90}	—	October 22, 2003	Kitt Peak	Spacewatch	·	3.2 km	MPC · JPL
692135	2014 TJ_{93}	—	February 23, 2012	Mount Lemmon	Mount Lemmon Survey	·	950 m	MPC · JPL
692136	2014 TB_{101}	—	October 1, 2014	Kitt Peak	Spacewatch	·	2.5 km	MPC · JPL
692137	2014 TU_{106}	—	October 1, 2014	Haleakala	Pan-STARRS 1	·	2.8 km	MPC · JPL
692138	2014 TA_{107}	—	October 1, 2014	Haleakala	Pan-STARRS 1	·	3.0 km	MPC · JPL
692139	2014 UA_{1}	—	January 20, 2009	Kitt Peak	Spacewatch	·	650 m	MPC · JPL
692140	2014 UM_{1}	—	October 21, 2003	Kitt Peak	Spacewatch	EOS	1.4 km	MPC · JPL
692141	2014 UG_{11}	—	November 15, 2003	Kitt Peak	Spacewatch	·	1.1 km	MPC · JPL
692142	2014 UD_{13}	—	November 19, 2003	Kitt Peak	Spacewatch	VER	2.2 km	MPC · JPL
692143	2014 UJ_{13}	—	September 4, 2008	Kitt Peak	Spacewatch	·	2.8 km	MPC · JPL
692144	2014 UJ_{17}	—	September 30, 2003	Apache Point	SDSS Collaboration	·	2.3 km	MPC · JPL
692145	2014 UJ_{23}	—	August 31, 2014	Haleakala	Pan-STARRS 1	·	2.4 km	MPC · JPL
692146	2014 UU_{25}	—	September 30, 2003	Kitt Peak	Spacewatch	EOS	1.7 km	MPC · JPL
692147	2014 UC_{33}	—	October 23, 2014	Mount Lemmon	Mount Lemmon Survey	H	580 m	MPC · JPL
692148	2014 UB_{34}	—	October 23, 2014	Mount Lemmon	Mount Lemmon Survey	H	530 m	MPC · JPL
692149	2014 UK_{37}	—	April 15, 2013	Haleakala	Pan-STARRS 1	·	980 m	MPC · JPL
692150	2014 UA_{38}	—	October 18, 2014	Mount Lemmon	Mount Lemmon Survey	·	2.0 km	MPC · JPL
692151	2014 UZ_{40}	—	October 20, 2014	Mount Lemmon	Mount Lemmon Survey	·	1.0 km	MPC · JPL
692152	2014 UZ_{42}	—	October 21, 2014	Kitt Peak	Spacewatch	(31811)	2.5 km	MPC · JPL
692153	2014 UM_{43}	—	September 30, 2003	Kitt Peak	Spacewatch	·	2.2 km	MPC · JPL
692154	2014 UB_{47}	—	September 19, 2009	Mount Lemmon	Mount Lemmon Survey	·	1.7 km	MPC · JPL
692155	2014 UY_{48}	—	December 30, 2007	Mount Lemmon	Mount Lemmon Survey	MAS	590 m	MPC · JPL
692156	2014 UZ_{48}	—	September 28, 2003	Kitt Peak	Spacewatch	·	770 m	MPC · JPL
692157	2014 UV_{65}	—	November 16, 2003	Kitt Peak	Spacewatch	NYS	980 m	MPC · JPL
692158	2014 UF_{67}	—	October 21, 2014	Kitt Peak	Spacewatch	·	3.3 km	MPC · JPL
692159	2014 UM_{68}	—	August 22, 2014	Haleakala	Pan-STARRS 1	(895)	3.3 km	MPC · JPL
692160	2014 UZ_{68}	—	November 9, 2009	Mount Lemmon	Mount Lemmon Survey	·	1.6 km	MPC · JPL
692161	2014 UZ_{71}	—	October 21, 2014	Mount Lemmon	Mount Lemmon Survey	·	1.6 km	MPC · JPL
692162	2014 UE_{72}	—	October 1, 2010	Kitt Peak	Spacewatch	NYS	980 m	MPC · JPL
692163	2014 US_{74}	—	December 6, 2007	Mount Lemmon	Mount Lemmon Survey	·	910 m	MPC · JPL
692164	2014 UB_{82}	—	October 27, 2009	Mount Lemmon	Mount Lemmon Survey	KOR	1.2 km	MPC · JPL
692165	2014 UL_{85}	—	October 20, 2003	Kitt Peak	Spacewatch	·	3.1 km	MPC · JPL
692166	2014 UX_{87}	—	October 17, 2014	Mount Lemmon	Mount Lemmon Survey	PHO	770 m	MPC · JPL
692167	2014 UP_{88}	—	December 19, 2004	Mount Lemmon	Mount Lemmon Survey	·	2.2 km	MPC · JPL
692168	2014 UT_{92}	—	October 2, 2014	Haleakala	Pan-STARRS 1	·	2.7 km	MPC · JPL
692169	2014 UB_{93}	—	May 8, 2013	Haleakala	Pan-STARRS 1	V	560 m	MPC · JPL
692170	2014 UN_{94}	—	October 21, 1995	Kitt Peak	Spacewatch	·	940 m	MPC · JPL
692171	2014 UJ_{100}	—	September 2, 2014	Haleakala	Pan-STARRS 1	·	850 m	MPC · JPL
692172	2014 UN_{101}	—	November 19, 2003	Kitt Peak	Spacewatch	V	530 m	MPC · JPL
692173	2014 UO_{101}	—	December 11, 2009	Mount Lemmon	Mount Lemmon Survey	·	2.7 km	MPC · JPL
692174	2014 UW_{103}	—	March 29, 2012	Haleakala	Pan-STARRS 1	·	3.3 km	MPC · JPL
692175	2014 UG_{113}	—	September 5, 2010	Mount Lemmon	Mount Lemmon Survey	·	970 m	MPC · JPL
692176	2014 UP_{117}	—	October 26, 2014	Mount Lemmon	Mount Lemmon Survey	H	390 m	MPC · JPL
692177	2014 UQ_{119}	—	September 21, 2009	Mount Lemmon	Mount Lemmon Survey	KOR	1.3 km	MPC · JPL
692178	2014 UE_{124}	—	July 14, 2013	Haleakala	Pan-STARRS 1	·	2.8 km	MPC · JPL
692179	2014 UK_{129}	—	September 11, 2010	Mount Lemmon	Mount Lemmon Survey	·	910 m	MPC · JPL
692180	2014 UH_{131}	—	September 25, 2014	Mount Lemmon	Mount Lemmon Survey	·	2.6 km	MPC · JPL
692181	2014 UD_{132}	—	September 12, 2007	Kitt Peak	Spacewatch	·	2.8 km	MPC · JPL
692182	2014 UE_{139}	—	October 25, 2008	Kitt Peak	Spacewatch	·	2.7 km	MPC · JPL
692183	2014 UF_{139}	—	August 24, 2008	Kitt Peak	Spacewatch	HYG	2.7 km	MPC · JPL
692184	2014 UD_{143}	—	August 13, 2010	Kitt Peak	Spacewatch	·	890 m	MPC · JPL
692185	2014 UT_{143}	—	October 17, 2014	Kitt Peak	Spacewatch	·	980 m	MPC · JPL
692186	2014 UB_{145}	—	October 4, 2014	Kitt Peak	Spacewatch	·	2.8 km	MPC · JPL
692187	2014 UK_{146}	—	October 24, 2003	Kitt Peak	Spacewatch	MAS	630 m	MPC · JPL
692188	2014 UL_{148}	—	September 17, 2010	Catalina	CSS	·	1.2 km	MPC · JPL
692189	2014 UC_{149}	—	December 18, 2009	Kitt Peak	Spacewatch	THM	2.0 km	MPC · JPL
692190	2014 UM_{149}	—	November 30, 2003	Kitt Peak	Spacewatch	·	2.4 km	MPC · JPL
692191	2014 UA_{150}	—	November 30, 2003	Kitt Peak	Spacewatch	·	2.5 km	MPC · JPL
692192	2014 UA_{155}	—	April 22, 2013	Mount Lemmon	Mount Lemmon Survey	·	2.5 km	MPC · JPL
692193	2014 UX_{161}	—	October 23, 2003	Kitt Peak	Spacewatch	V	560 m	MPC · JPL
692194	2014 UM_{167}	—	June 15, 2013	Mount Lemmon	Mount Lemmon Survey	·	2.9 km	MPC · JPL
692195	2014 UD_{168}	—	March 25, 2011	Haleakala	Pan-STARRS 1	·	2.1 km	MPC · JPL
692196	2014 UJ_{169}	—	July 16, 2013	Haleakala	Pan-STARRS 1	·	2.9 km	MPC · JPL
692197	2014 UU_{177}	—	September 18, 2009	Kitt Peak	Spacewatch	KOR	1.2 km	MPC · JPL
692198	2014 UG_{178}	—	June 18, 2013	Haleakala	Pan-STARRS 1	KOR	1.2 km	MPC · JPL
692199	2014 UX_{180}	—	October 1, 2014	Haleakala	Pan-STARRS 1	·	2.4 km	MPC · JPL
692200	2014 UR_{187}	—	September 6, 2008	Kitt Peak	Spacewatch	·	2.1 km	MPC · JPL

== 692201–692300 ==
back to top

Designation			Discovery			Properties		Ref
Permanent	Provisional	Named after	Date	Site	Discoverer(s)	Category	Diam.	Ref
692201	2014 UC_{191}	—	November 20, 2003	Kitt Peak	Spacewatch	ERI	1.4 km	MPC · JPL
692202	2014 UY_{192}	—	August 29, 2014	Kitt Peak	Spacewatch	·	2.5 km	MPC · JPL
692203	2014 UW_{193}	—	April 20, 2012	Mount Lemmon	Mount Lemmon Survey	·	2.4 km	MPC · JPL
692204	2014 UZ_{194}	—	October 23, 2003	Kitt Peak	Spacewatch	·	3.1 km	MPC · JPL
692205	2014 UA_{196}	—	March 1, 2011	Mount Lemmon	Mount Lemmon Survey	·	2.2 km	MPC · JPL
692206	2014 UM_{196}	—	September 19, 1998	Apache Point	SDSS Collaboration	EOS	1.6 km	MPC · JPL
692207	2014 UZ_{206}	—	August 31, 2014	Haleakala	Pan-STARRS 1	·	1.0 km	MPC · JPL
692208	2014 US_{211}	—	November 26, 2003	Kitt Peak	Spacewatch	·	3.3 km	MPC · JPL
692209	2014 UV_{212}	—	September 18, 2014	Haleakala	Pan-STARRS 1	·	2.7 km	MPC · JPL
692210	2014 UF_{213}	—	August 22, 2014	Haleakala	Pan-STARRS 1	·	3.3 km	MPC · JPL
692211	2014 UB_{215}	—	March 23, 2003	Apache Point	SDSS Collaboration	·	2.0 km	MPC · JPL
692212	2014 UL_{217}	—	November 9, 2009	Mount Lemmon	Mount Lemmon Survey	·	3.2 km	MPC · JPL
692213	2014 UZ_{217}	—	September 16, 2003	Kitt Peak	Spacewatch	·	2.5 km	MPC · JPL
692214	2014 UL_{220}	—	July 1, 2013	Haleakala	Pan-STARRS 1	·	3.2 km	MPC · JPL
692215	2014 US_{220}	—	March 3, 2006	Kitt Peak	Spacewatch	·	2.8 km	MPC · JPL
692216	2014 UZ_{220}	—	December 10, 2009	Mount Lemmon	Mount Lemmon Survey	·	3.2 km	MPC · JPL
692217	2014 UV_{222}	—	October 3, 2003	Kitt Peak	Spacewatch	·	2.3 km	MPC · JPL
692218	2014 UP_{227}	—	September 19, 2008	Kitt Peak	Spacewatch	·	2.6 km	MPC · JPL
692219	2014 UM_{230}	—	April 23, 2007	Kitt Peak	Spacewatch	KOR	1.4 km	MPC · JPL
692220	2014 UQ_{232}	—	October 29, 2014	Haleakala	Pan-STARRS 1	·	1.6 km	MPC · JPL
692221	2014 UD_{233}	—	September 21, 2003	Kitt Peak	Spacewatch	·	2.0 km	MPC · JPL
692222	2014 UK_{234}	—	October 21, 2014	Charleston	R. Holmes	·	730 m	MPC · JPL
692223	2014 UL_{240}	—	January 18, 2004	Kitt Peak	Spacewatch	·	3.3 km	MPC · JPL
692224	2014 UP_{240}	—	July 14, 2013	Haleakala	Pan-STARRS 1	·	3.0 km	MPC · JPL
692225	2014 UV_{240}	—	October 18, 2014	Mount Lemmon	Mount Lemmon Survey	·	2.6 km	MPC · JPL
692226	2014 UX_{240}	—	October 30, 2014	Haleakala	Pan-STARRS 1	URS	3.0 km	MPC · JPL
692227	2014 UT_{246}	—	October 13, 2014	Mount Lemmon	Mount Lemmon Survey	·	580 m	MPC · JPL
692228	2014 UP_{255}	—	October 28, 2014	Haleakala	Pan-STARRS 1	·	1.6 km	MPC · JPL
692229	2014 UA_{257}	—	October 28, 2014	Haleakala	Pan-STARRS 1	·	920 m	MPC · JPL
692230	2014 UV_{258}	—	October 24, 2014	Mount Lemmon	Mount Lemmon Survey	·	1.3 km	MPC · JPL
692231	2014 UK_{263}	—	October 17, 2014	Mount Lemmon	Mount Lemmon Survey	·	2.2 km	MPC · JPL
692232	2014 UM_{265}	—	October 30, 2014	Haleakala	Pan-STARRS 1	·	2.7 km	MPC · JPL
692233	2014 UK_{267}	—	October 28, 2014	Haleakala	Pan-STARRS 1	·	2.5 km	MPC · JPL
692234	2014 UX_{268}	—	October 29, 2014	Haleakala	Pan-STARRS 1	·	690 m	MPC · JPL
692235	2014 US_{269}	—	October 28, 2014	Mount Lemmon	Mount Lemmon Survey	·	2.2 km	MPC · JPL
692236	2014 UR_{274}	—	October 18, 2014	Kitt Peak	Spacewatch	MAS	600 m	MPC · JPL
692237	2014 VX_{12}	—	February 1, 2009	Kitt Peak	Spacewatch	·	740 m	MPC · JPL
692238	2014 VN_{15}	—	April 30, 2013	Siding Spring	SSS	H	580 m	MPC · JPL
692239	2014 VJ_{22}	—	November 12, 2014	Haleakala	Pan-STARRS 1	EOS	1.7 km	MPC · JPL
692240	2014 VC_{26}	—	November 12, 2014	Haleakala	Pan-STARRS 1	·	3.4 km	MPC · JPL
692241	2014 VQ_{28}	—	November 14, 2014	Kitt Peak	Spacewatch	·	970 m	MPC · JPL
692242	2014 VU_{38}	—	October 14, 2009	Mount Lemmon	Mount Lemmon Survey	AGN	1.2 km	MPC · JPL
692243	2014 VZ_{38}	—	November 1, 2014	Mount Lemmon	Mount Lemmon Survey	·	3.0 km	MPC · JPL
692244	2014 VY_{41}	—	November 4, 2014	Mount Lemmon	Mount Lemmon Survey	·	1.1 km	MPC · JPL
692245	2014 WC_{3}	—	October 2, 2014	Haleakala	Pan-STARRS 1	H	450 m	MPC · JPL
692246	2014 WG_{5}	—	October 25, 2008	Kitt Peak	Spacewatch	·	2.9 km	MPC · JPL
692247	2014 WC_{11}	—	December 18, 2004	Mount Lemmon	Mount Lemmon Survey	·	600 m	MPC · JPL
692248	2014 WG_{11}	—	December 1, 2003	Kitt Peak	Spacewatch	VER	2.3 km	MPC · JPL
692249	2014 WL_{12}	—	September 2, 2008	Kitt Peak	Spacewatch	·	2.0 km	MPC · JPL
692250	2014 WR_{12}	—	November 16, 2014	Mount Lemmon	Mount Lemmon Survey	·	760 m	MPC · JPL
692251	2014 WX_{17}	—	November 16, 2014	Mount Lemmon	Mount Lemmon Survey	EOS	1.5 km	MPC · JPL
692252	2014 WR_{23}	—	September 21, 2009	Mount Lemmon	Mount Lemmon Survey	·	1.6 km	MPC · JPL
692253	2014 WL_{25}	—	November 24, 2009	Kitt Peak	Spacewatch	KOR	1.3 km	MPC · JPL
692254	2014 WV_{29}	—	October 2, 2006	Mount Lemmon	Mount Lemmon Survey	·	930 m	MPC · JPL
692255	2014 WZ_{29}	—	October 18, 2014	Mount Lemmon	Mount Lemmon Survey	TEL	1.4 km	MPC · JPL
692256	2014 WQ_{30}	—	April 26, 2001	La Silla	Barbieri, C.	·	2.1 km	MPC · JPL
692257	2014 WT_{32}	—	February 1, 2012	Kitt Peak	Spacewatch	V	560 m	MPC · JPL
692258	2014 WV_{32}	—	October 21, 2009	Mount Lemmon	Mount Lemmon Survey	BRA	1.4 km	MPC · JPL
692259	2014 WF_{44}	—	September 23, 2008	Kitt Peak	Spacewatch	EOS	1.7 km	MPC · JPL
692260	2014 WX_{45}	—	November 17, 2014	Haleakala	Pan-STARRS 1	·	1.1 km	MPC · JPL
692261	2014 WK_{46}	—	March 8, 2008	Mount Lemmon	Mount Lemmon Survey	MAS	560 m	MPC · JPL
692262	2014 WR_{46}	—	June 11, 2013	Kitt Peak	Spacewatch	H	510 m	MPC · JPL
692263	2014 WA_{47}	—	May 12, 2007	Kitt Peak	Spacewatch	·	2.1 km	MPC · JPL
692264	2014 WD_{47}	—	October 8, 2008	Kitt Peak	Spacewatch	HYG	2.5 km	MPC · JPL
692265	2014 WD_{49}	—	November 17, 2014	Haleakala	Pan-STARRS 1	·	930 m	MPC · JPL
692266	2014 WL_{49}	—	April 3, 2011	Haleakala	Pan-STARRS 1	·	2.4 km	MPC · JPL
692267	2014 WO_{51}	—	December 14, 2010	Mount Lemmon	Mount Lemmon Survey	·	900 m	MPC · JPL
692268	2014 WV_{57}	—	October 31, 2010	Mount Lemmon	Mount Lemmon Survey	·	990 m	MPC · JPL
692269	2014 WN_{58}	—	October 18, 2014	Mount Lemmon	Mount Lemmon Survey	·	3.0 km	MPC · JPL
692270	2014 WP_{58}	—	February 14, 2002	Cerro Tololo	Deep Lens Survey	·	560 m	MPC · JPL
692271	2014 WK_{61}	—	September 18, 2003	Palomar	NEAT	EOS	1.5 km	MPC · JPL
692272	2014 WN_{64}	—	October 29, 2014	Haleakala	Pan-STARRS 1	H	370 m	MPC · JPL
692273	2014 WU_{64}	—	August 31, 2014	Haleakala	Pan-STARRS 1	·	3.2 km	MPC · JPL
692274	2014 WB_{66}	—	November 3, 2004	Kitt Peak	Spacewatch	·	590 m	MPC · JPL
692275	2014 WE_{67}	—	September 1, 2010	Socorro	LINEAR	MAS	650 m	MPC · JPL
692276	2014 WG_{71}	—	January 11, 2008	Kitt Peak	Spacewatch	·	990 m	MPC · JPL
692277	2014 WB_{79}	—	March 13, 2011	Kitt Peak	Spacewatch	·	2.1 km	MPC · JPL
692278	2014 WR_{79}	—	November 20, 2009	Mount Lemmon	Mount Lemmon Survey	·	1.6 km	MPC · JPL
692279	2014 WP_{81}	—	August 31, 2014	Haleakala	Pan-STARRS 1	·	2.9 km	MPC · JPL
692280	2014 WD_{85}	—	July 13, 2013	Haleakala	Pan-STARRS 1	·	2.1 km	MPC · JPL
692281	2014 WA_{87}	—	November 1, 1999	Kitt Peak	Spacewatch	·	1.7 km	MPC · JPL
692282	2014 WH_{90}	—	March 28, 2011	Mount Lemmon	Mount Lemmon Survey	HYG	2.5 km	MPC · JPL
692283	2014 WX_{91}	—	February 13, 2005	La Silla	A. Boattini	·	650 m	MPC · JPL
692284	2014 WA_{93}	—	August 23, 2003	Palomar	NEAT	EOS	1.7 km	MPC · JPL
692285	2014 WZ_{93}	—	November 17, 2014	Mount Lemmon	Mount Lemmon Survey	(5)	840 m	MPC · JPL
692286	2014 WJ_{101}	—	February 13, 2011	Mount Lemmon	Mount Lemmon Survey	·	2.9 km	MPC · JPL
692287	2014 WT_{102}	—	September 28, 2003	Kitt Peak	Spacewatch	THM	1.7 km	MPC · JPL
692288	2014 WD_{103}	—	February 8, 2011	Mount Lemmon	Mount Lemmon Survey	·	1.5 km	MPC · JPL
692289	2014 WR_{104}	—	September 29, 2014	Haleakala	Pan-STARRS 1	NYS	790 m	MPC · JPL
692290	2014 WX_{105}	—	October 1, 2014	Kitt Peak	Spacewatch	V	490 m	MPC · JPL
692291	2014 WA_{107}	—	November 18, 2014	Mount Lemmon	Mount Lemmon Survey	·	860 m	MPC · JPL
692292	2014 WW_{107}	—	October 20, 2003	Kitt Peak	Spacewatch	THM	2.1 km	MPC · JPL
692293	2014 WJ_{109}	—	October 25, 2014	Haleakala	Pan-STARRS 1	·	850 m	MPC · JPL
692294	2014 WS_{111}	—	May 21, 2012	Haleakala	Pan-STARRS 1	·	2.9 km	MPC · JPL
692295	2014 WC_{112}	—	June 25, 1995	Kitt Peak	Spacewatch	·	1.1 km	MPC · JPL
692296	2014 WP_{115}	—	October 30, 2014	Mount Lemmon	Mount Lemmon Survey	·	2.9 km	MPC · JPL
692297	2014 WB_{117}	—	October 23, 2009	Kitt Peak	Spacewatch	·	1.9 km	MPC · JPL
692298	2014 WA_{122}	—	April 22, 2013	Mount Lemmon	Mount Lemmon Survey	MAS	630 m	MPC · JPL
692299	2014 WZ_{124}	—	October 20, 2007	Catalina	CSS	·	640 m	MPC · JPL
692300	2014 WS_{140}	—	August 15, 2013	Haleakala	Pan-STARRS 1	·	1.8 km	MPC · JPL

== 692301–692400 ==
back to top

Designation			Discovery			Properties		Ref
Permanent	Provisional	Named after	Date	Site	Discoverer(s)	Category	Diam.	Ref
692301	2014 WG_{141}	—	November 17, 2014	Haleakala	Pan-STARRS 1	·	680 m	MPC · JPL
692302	2014 WX_{144}	—	November 13, 2010	Mount Lemmon	Mount Lemmon Survey	·	960 m	MPC · JPL
692303	2014 WL_{146}	—	March 14, 2007	Mount Lemmon	Mount Lemmon Survey	·	1.9 km	MPC · JPL
692304	2014 WT_{146}	—	October 14, 2014	Kitt Peak	Spacewatch	·	2.0 km	MPC · JPL
692305	2014 WY_{147}	—	August 31, 2014	Haleakala	Pan-STARRS 1	·	790 m	MPC · JPL
692306	2014 WM_{148}	—	October 25, 2001	Apache Point	SDSS Collaboration	·	570 m	MPC · JPL
692307	2014 WX_{153}	—	April 24, 2012	Mount Lemmon	Mount Lemmon Survey	EOS	1.6 km	MPC · JPL
692308	2014 WC_{156}	—	June 30, 2013	Haleakala	Pan-STARRS 1	·	2.6 km	MPC · JPL
692309	2014 WQ_{158}	—	October 2, 2014	Haleakala	Pan-STARRS 1	V	530 m	MPC · JPL
692310	2014 WA_{160}	—	March 9, 2005	Mount Lemmon	Mount Lemmon Survey	·	2.3 km	MPC · JPL
692311	2014 WC_{161}	—	April 25, 2006	Kitt Peak	Spacewatch	·	3.0 km	MPC · JPL
692312	2014 WD_{161}	—	November 18, 2014	Mount Lemmon	Mount Lemmon Survey	·	3.4 km	MPC · JPL
692313	2014 WA_{163}	—	April 3, 2011	Haleakala	Pan-STARRS 1	HYG	2.1 km	MPC · JPL
692314	2014 WA_{171}	—	April 13, 2012	Haleakala	Pan-STARRS 1	KOR	1.1 km	MPC · JPL
692315	2014 WM_{171}	—	July 14, 2013	Haleakala	Pan-STARRS 1	·	2.0 km	MPC · JPL
692316	2014 WO_{171}	—	September 24, 2014	Mount Lemmon	Mount Lemmon Survey	·	1.6 km	MPC · JPL
692317	2014 WU_{171}	—	September 27, 2009	Kitt Peak	Spacewatch	KOR	1 km	MPC · JPL
692318	2014 WB_{176}	—	September 2, 2014	Haleakala	Pan-STARRS 1	NYS	820 m	MPC · JPL
692319	2014 WC_{178}	—	October 25, 2014	Mount Lemmon	Mount Lemmon Survey	·	1.1 km	MPC · JPL
692320	2014 WQ_{179}	—	January 2, 2012	Mount Lemmon	Mount Lemmon Survey	·	920 m	MPC · JPL
692321	2014 WG_{184}	—	October 27, 2008	Kitt Peak	Spacewatch	·	2.7 km	MPC · JPL
692322	2014 WU_{185}	—	September 12, 2002	Palomar	NEAT	EOS	1.8 km	MPC · JPL
692323	2014 WQ_{187}	—	December 10, 2009	Mount Lemmon	Mount Lemmon Survey	EOS	1.8 km	MPC · JPL
692324	2014 WV_{187}	—	November 20, 2014	Haleakala	Pan-STARRS 1	·	2.6 km	MPC · JPL
692325	2014 WY_{190}	—	March 30, 2011	Haleakala	Pan-STARRS 1	·	2.5 km	MPC · JPL
692326	2014 WY_{192}	—	September 4, 2014	Haleakala	Pan-STARRS 1	·	2.6 km	MPC · JPL
692327	2014 WC_{194}	—	December 25, 2006	Kitt Peak	Spacewatch	·	970 m	MPC · JPL
692328	2014 WQ_{203}	—	September 24, 2008	Mount Lemmon	Mount Lemmon Survey	EOS	1.8 km	MPC · JPL
692329	2014 WO_{206}	—	April 15, 2012	Haleakala	Pan-STARRS 1	·	1.9 km	MPC · JPL
692330	2014 WH_{209}	—	April 15, 2013	Haleakala	Pan-STARRS 1	·	880 m	MPC · JPL
692331	2014 WJ_{211}	—	November 17, 2014	Haleakala	Pan-STARRS 1	·	1.1 km	MPC · JPL
692332	2014 WR_{212}	—	March 30, 2011	Piszkés-tető	K. Sárneczky, Z. Kuli	·	3.5 km	MPC · JPL
692333	2014 WJ_{214}	—	September 27, 2003	Kitt Peak	Spacewatch	EOS	1.8 km	MPC · JPL
692334	2014 WM_{215}	—	March 29, 2001	Kitt Peak	SKADS	·	1.7 km	MPC · JPL
692335	2014 WB_{216}	—	November 18, 2003	Kitt Peak	Spacewatch	·	2.3 km	MPC · JPL
692336	2014 WP_{223}	—	May 25, 2012	Mayhill-ISON	L. Elenin	·	2.9 km	MPC · JPL
692337	2014 WY_{233}	—	August 6, 2014	Haleakala	Pan-STARRS 1	·	2.9 km	MPC · JPL
692338	2014 WW_{234}	—	August 23, 2014	Haleakala	Pan-STARRS 1	·	2.2 km	MPC · JPL
692339	2014 WB_{236}	—	September 6, 2008	Mount Lemmon	Mount Lemmon Survey	·	2.1 km	MPC · JPL
692340	2014 WC_{236}	—	November 28, 2006	Mount Lemmon	Mount Lemmon Survey	·	1.3 km	MPC · JPL
692341	2014 WD_{236}	—	July 14, 2013	Haleakala	Pan-STARRS 1	EOS	1.9 km	MPC · JPL
692342	2014 WG_{237}	—	November 17, 2009	Mount Lemmon	Mount Lemmon Survey	·	1.8 km	MPC · JPL
692343	2014 WO_{237}	—	November 18, 2009	Kitt Peak	Spacewatch	·	3.2 km	MPC · JPL
692344	2014 WQ_{239}	—	October 20, 2014	Kitt Peak	Spacewatch	·	2.7 km	MPC · JPL
692345	2014 WH_{240}	—	January 24, 2007	Mount Nyukasa	Japan Aerospace Exploration Agency	·	840 m	MPC · JPL
692346	2014 WL_{242}	—	April 12, 2013	Haleakala	Pan-STARRS 1	·	3.0 km	MPC · JPL
692347	2014 WX_{242}	—	August 6, 2014	Haleakala	Pan-STARRS 1	·	3.1 km	MPC · JPL
692348	2014 WK_{243}	—	June 7, 2003	Kitt Peak	Spacewatch	H	420 m	MPC · JPL
692349	2014 WH_{245}	—	November 13, 2010	Mount Lemmon	Mount Lemmon Survey	·	1.8 km	MPC · JPL
692350	2014 WA_{247}	—	September 24, 2014	Catalina	CSS	H	500 m	MPC · JPL
692351	2014 WB_{247}	—	November 4, 2005	Kitt Peak	Spacewatch	·	1.8 km	MPC · JPL
692352	2014 WJ_{247}	—	November 20, 2009	Kitt Peak	Spacewatch	·	2.7 km	MPC · JPL
692353	2014 WL_{248}	—	August 27, 2014	Haleakala	Pan-STARRS 1	·	3.2 km	MPC · JPL
692354	2014 WV_{248}	—	December 1, 2010	Mount Lemmon	Mount Lemmon Survey	·	1.7 km	MPC · JPL
692355	2014 WD_{249}	—	April 14, 2007	Kitt Peak	Spacewatch	·	2.9 km	MPC · JPL
692356	2014 WC_{253}	—	October 24, 2003	Apache Point	SDSS Collaboration	·	2.6 km	MPC · JPL
692357	2014 WG_{254}	—	September 4, 2008	Kitt Peak	Spacewatch	·	2.7 km	MPC · JPL
692358	2014 WQ_{254}	—	August 22, 2006	Palomar	NEAT	·	1.1 km	MPC · JPL
692359	2014 WB_{256}	—	September 20, 2014	Haleakala	Pan-STARRS 1	·	970 m	MPC · JPL
692360	2014 WD_{258}	—	December 30, 2008	Kitt Peak	Spacewatch	SYL	3.3 km	MPC · JPL
692361	2014 WO_{263}	—	November 21, 2014	Haleakala	Pan-STARRS 1	·	2.7 km	MPC · JPL
692362	2014 WW_{263}	—	May 1, 2006	Kitt Peak	Spacewatch	·	3.0 km	MPC · JPL
692363	2014 WG_{264}	—	November 21, 2014	Haleakala	Pan-STARRS 1	·	680 m	MPC · JPL
692364	2014 WP_{265}	—	May 2, 2013	Kitt Peak	Spacewatch	PHO	780 m	MPC · JPL
692365	2014 WS_{265}	—	September 22, 2014	Haleakala	Pan-STARRS 1	·	2.3 km	MPC · JPL
692366	2014 WY_{265}	—	June 8, 2012	Mount Lemmon	Mount Lemmon Survey	VER	2.4 km	MPC · JPL
692367	2014 WO_{266}	—	October 25, 2014	Mount Lemmon	Mount Lemmon Survey	V	500 m	MPC · JPL
692368	2014 WL_{272}	—	September 30, 2003	Kitt Peak	Spacewatch	·	2.6 km	MPC · JPL
692369	2014 WE_{277}	—	March 25, 2011	Mount Lemmon	Mount Lemmon Survey	·	2.4 km	MPC · JPL
692370	2014 WB_{278}	—	August 4, 2013	Haleakala	Pan-STARRS 1	EOS	1.6 km	MPC · JPL
692371	2014 WN_{278}	—	August 19, 2006	Palomar	NEAT	·	1.2 km	MPC · JPL
692372	2014 WY_{278}	—	November 21, 2014	Haleakala	Pan-STARRS 1	·	910 m	MPC · JPL
692373	2014 WQ_{279}	—	April 6, 2011	Mount Lemmon	Mount Lemmon Survey	·	3.8 km	MPC · JPL
692374	2014 WW_{282}	—	July 15, 2013	Haleakala	Pan-STARRS 1	EOS	1.2 km	MPC · JPL
692375	2014 WT_{286}	—	November 21, 2014	Haleakala	Pan-STARRS 1	·	730 m	MPC · JPL
692376	2014 WB_{288}	—	November 21, 2014	Haleakala	Pan-STARRS 1	·	2.9 km	MPC · JPL
692377	2014 WY_{289}	—	November 21, 2014	Haleakala	Pan-STARRS 1	·	820 m	MPC · JPL
692378	2014 WQ_{291}	—	December 11, 2004	Kitt Peak	Spacewatch	EOS	1.7 km	MPC · JPL
692379	2014 WW_{295}	—	March 9, 2011	Mount Lemmon	Mount Lemmon Survey	·	3.0 km	MPC · JPL
692380	2014 WK_{297}	—	January 28, 2011	Kitt Peak	Spacewatch	·	2.1 km	MPC · JPL
692381	2014 WU_{297}	—	July 12, 2013	Haleakala	Pan-STARRS 1	·	2.2 km	MPC · JPL
692382	2014 WR_{298}	—	October 22, 2003	Apache Point	SDSS Collaboration	EOS	2.0 km	MPC · JPL
692383	2014 WP_{301}	—	August 22, 2014	Haleakala	Pan-STARRS 1	·	2.9 km	MPC · JPL
692384	2014 WP_{302}	—	August 27, 2008	Dauban	Kugel, C. R. F.	EOS	1.9 km	MPC · JPL
692385	2014 WR_{307}	—	November 2, 2007	Kitt Peak	Spacewatch	·	760 m	MPC · JPL
692386	2014 WL_{314}	—	August 30, 2014	Haleakala	Pan-STARRS 1	·	2.5 km	MPC · JPL
692387	2014 WJ_{315}	—	August 25, 2014	Haleakala	Pan-STARRS 1	·	700 m	MPC · JPL
692388	2014 WY_{317}	—	October 30, 2014	Haleakala	Pan-STARRS 1	EOS	1.5 km	MPC · JPL
692389	2014 WE_{318}	—	October 30, 2014	Haleakala	Pan-STARRS 1	·	3.2 km	MPC · JPL
692390	2014 WV_{319}	—	November 22, 2014	Haleakala	Pan-STARRS 1	·	2.7 km	MPC · JPL
692391	2014 WD_{320}	—	November 22, 2014	Haleakala	Pan-STARRS 1	·	980 m	MPC · JPL
692392	2014 WH_{320}	—	December 31, 1999	Kitt Peak	Spacewatch	EOS	2.0 km	MPC · JPL
692393	2014 WO_{323}	—	October 28, 2014	Mount Lemmon	Mount Lemmon Survey	EOS	1.8 km	MPC · JPL
692394	2014 WC_{324}	—	April 2, 2009	Kitt Peak	Spacewatch	·	1.1 km	MPC · JPL
692395	2014 WU_{324}	—	October 29, 2014	Haleakala	Pan-STARRS 1	T_{j} (2.96)	3.3 km	MPC · JPL
692396	2014 WN_{325}	—	December 19, 2004	Mount Lemmon	Mount Lemmon Survey	EOS	1.6 km	MPC · JPL
692397	2014 WZ_{325}	—	September 14, 2002	Palomar	NEAT	·	2.6 km	MPC · JPL
692398	2014 WV_{328}	—	November 30, 2008	Kitt Peak	Spacewatch	·	2.7 km	MPC · JPL
692399	2014 WF_{329}	—	November 22, 2014	Haleakala	Pan-STARRS 1	·	2.0 km	MPC · JPL
692400	2014 WW_{329}	—	April 19, 2007	Mount Lemmon	Mount Lemmon Survey	·	1.7 km	MPC · JPL

== 692401–692500 ==
back to top

Designation			Discovery			Properties		Ref
Permanent	Provisional	Named after	Date	Site	Discoverer(s)	Category	Diam.	Ref
692401	2014 WB_{331}	—	August 15, 2013	Haleakala	Pan-STARRS 1	·	2.8 km	MPC · JPL
692402	2014 WY_{332}	—	April 13, 2013	Kitt Peak	Spacewatch	V	540 m	MPC · JPL
692403	2014 WJ_{336}	—	July 16, 2013	Haleakala	Pan-STARRS 1	·	1.5 km	MPC · JPL
692404	2014 WT_{339}	—	April 27, 2012	Haleakala	Pan-STARRS 1	·	2.9 km	MPC · JPL
692405	2014 WL_{340}	—	February 13, 2011	Mount Lemmon	Mount Lemmon Survey	·	1.5 km	MPC · JPL
692406	2014 WY_{344}	—	August 17, 2013	Haleakala	Pan-STARRS 1	·	3.1 km	MPC · JPL
692407	2014 WA_{345}	—	October 29, 2014	Haleakala	Pan-STARRS 1	·	3.3 km	MPC · JPL
692408	2014 WV_{347}	—	October 26, 2014	Mount Lemmon	Mount Lemmon Survey	·	1.7 km	MPC · JPL
692409	2014 WX_{350}	—	March 4, 2011	Catalina	CSS	·	4.2 km	MPC · JPL
692410	2014 WN_{351}	—	October 29, 2014	Haleakala	Pan-STARRS 1	·	1.9 km	MPC · JPL
692411	2014 WX_{351}	—	December 13, 1999	Kitt Peak	Spacewatch	EOS	1.3 km	MPC · JPL
692412	2014 WZ_{351}	—	February 21, 2006	Mount Lemmon	Mount Lemmon Survey	KOR	1.1 km	MPC · JPL
692413	2014 WK_{354}	—	November 23, 2014	Haleakala	Pan-STARRS 1	EUN	850 m	MPC · JPL
692414	2014 WW_{356}	—	November 24, 2014	Mount Lemmon	Mount Lemmon Survey	V	580 m	MPC · JPL
692415	2014 WD_{357}	—	June 15, 2004	Palomar	NEAT	·	3.0 km	MPC · JPL
692416	2014 WS_{358}	—	November 21, 2008	Mount Lemmon	Mount Lemmon Survey	·	670 m	MPC · JPL
692417	2014 WV_{362}	—	November 26, 2014	Mount Lemmon	Mount Lemmon Survey	H	470 m	MPC · JPL
692418	2014 WZ_{370}	—	October 5, 2014	Haleakala	Pan-STARRS 1	H	420 m	MPC · JPL
692419	2014 WO_{376}	—	September 28, 2003	Kitt Peak	Spacewatch	·	2.0 km	MPC · JPL
692420	2014 WN_{382}	—	October 22, 2014	Mount Lemmon	Mount Lemmon Survey	·	2.2 km	MPC · JPL
692421	2014 WD_{384}	—	December 16, 2007	Kitt Peak	Spacewatch	·	1.1 km	MPC · JPL
692422	2014 WZ_{384}	—	January 28, 2011	Kitt Peak	Spacewatch	·	2.1 km	MPC · JPL
692423	2014 WC_{387}	—	October 25, 2013	Mount Lemmon	Mount Lemmon Survey	L5	7.0 km	MPC · JPL
692424	2014 WA_{401}	—	July 15, 2013	Haleakala	Pan-STARRS 1	KOR	1.1 km	MPC · JPL
692425	2014 WZ_{407}	—	November 2, 2007	Kitt Peak	Spacewatch	·	800 m	MPC · JPL
692426	2014 WC_{411}	—	November 22, 2006	Mount Lemmon	Mount Lemmon Survey	·	1.1 km	MPC · JPL
692427	2014 WK_{411}	—	May 16, 2012	Mount Lemmon	Mount Lemmon Survey	·	960 m	MPC · JPL
692428	2014 WX_{412}	—	November 26, 2014	Haleakala	Pan-STARRS 1	·	770 m	MPC · JPL
692429	2014 WN_{413}	—	September 3, 2013	Haleakala	Pan-STARRS 1	·	1.9 km	MPC · JPL
692430	2014 WV_{414}	—	November 8, 2007	Mount Lemmon	Mount Lemmon Survey	·	590 m	MPC · JPL
692431	2014 WD_{416}	—	November 26, 2014	Haleakala	Pan-STARRS 1	·	800 m	MPC · JPL
692432	2014 WD_{417}	—	November 26, 2014	Haleakala	Pan-STARRS 1	EUN	690 m	MPC · JPL
692433	2014 WF_{417}	—	September 30, 2003	Kitt Peak	Spacewatch	·	2.0 km	MPC · JPL
692434	2014 WA_{420}	—	October 13, 2010	Mount Lemmon	Mount Lemmon Survey	·	690 m	MPC · JPL
692435	2014 WJ_{420}	—	November 26, 2014	Haleakala	Pan-STARRS 1	·	870 m	MPC · JPL
692436	2014 WN_{422}	—	November 26, 2014	Haleakala	Pan-STARRS 1	·	3.3 km	MPC · JPL
692437	2014 WA_{429}	—	November 26, 2014	Haleakala	Pan-STARRS 1	T_{j} (2.96) · 3:2	5.5 km	MPC · JPL
692438	2014 WO_{430}	—	November 30, 2003	Kitt Peak	Spacewatch	(43176)	2.7 km	MPC · JPL
692439	2014 WG_{431}	—	November 16, 1998	Kitt Peak	Spacewatch	EOS	1.8 km	MPC · JPL
692440	2014 WC_{436}	—	October 10, 2008	Kitt Peak	Spacewatch	·	2.3 km	MPC · JPL
692441	2014 WT_{436}	—	November 4, 2014	Mount Lemmon	Mount Lemmon Survey	·	1.2 km	MPC · JPL
692442	2014 WL_{438}	—	October 7, 2008	Kitt Peak	Spacewatch	·	2.6 km	MPC · JPL
692443	2014 WU_{438}	—	October 22, 2003	Kitt Peak	Spacewatch	·	2.0 km	MPC · JPL
692444	2014 WZ_{439}	—	October 17, 2009	Mount Lemmon	Mount Lemmon Survey	·	2.1 km	MPC · JPL
692445	2014 WG_{445}	—	November 14, 2014	Kitt Peak	Spacewatch	·	650 m	MPC · JPL
692446	2014 WN_{447}	—	December 21, 2006	Kitt Peak	Spacewatch	·	810 m	MPC · JPL
692447	2014 WF_{449}	—	January 8, 2010	Kitt Peak	Spacewatch	·	3.4 km	MPC · JPL
692448	2014 WS_{449}	—	October 9, 2008	Mount Lemmon	Mount Lemmon Survey	·	2.7 km	MPC · JPL
692449	2014 WN_{450}	—	March 10, 2005	Mount Lemmon	Mount Lemmon Survey	·	2.2 km	MPC · JPL
692450	2014 WC_{453}	—	December 18, 2009	Mount Lemmon	Mount Lemmon Survey	·	3.1 km	MPC · JPL
692451	2014 WH_{460}	—	November 18, 2014	Mount Lemmon	Mount Lemmon Survey	THM	1.9 km	MPC · JPL
692452	2014 WD_{464}	—	November 17, 2014	Haleakala	Pan-STARRS 1	·	1.7 km	MPC · JPL
692453	2014 WM_{466}	—	November 19, 2014	Haleakala	Pan-STARRS 1	·	1.1 km	MPC · JPL
692454	2014 WN_{466}	—	March 6, 2011	Mount Lemmon	Mount Lemmon Survey	·	1.9 km	MPC · JPL
692455	2014 WM_{470}	—	October 17, 2010	Mount Lemmon	Mount Lemmon Survey	·	980 m	MPC · JPL
692456	2014 WR_{470}	—	May 9, 1996	Kitt Peak	Spacewatch	·	2.6 km	MPC · JPL
692457	2014 WO_{473}	—	November 22, 2006	Mount Lemmon	Mount Lemmon Survey	·	770 m	MPC · JPL
692458	2014 WN_{476}	—	January 11, 2011	Mount Lemmon	Mount Lemmon Survey	(5)	870 m	MPC · JPL
692459	2014 WU_{478}	—	November 28, 2014	Haleakala	Pan-STARRS 1	·	1.3 km	MPC · JPL
692460	2014 WP_{481}	—	January 9, 2011	Mount Lemmon	Mount Lemmon Survey	(5)	1.1 km	MPC · JPL
692461	2014 WZ_{481}	—	October 18, 2003	Kitt Peak	Spacewatch	·	1.9 km	MPC · JPL
692462	2014 WT_{483}	—	June 19, 2006	Mount Lemmon	Mount Lemmon Survey	·	1.2 km	MPC · JPL
692463	2014 WD_{487}	—	April 18, 2012	Kitt Peak	Spacewatch	·	1.5 km	MPC · JPL
692464	2014 WZ_{488}	—	April 1, 2008	Kitt Peak	Spacewatch	·	1.2 km	MPC · JPL
692465	2014 WB_{489}	—	November 30, 2014	Mount Lemmon	Mount Lemmon Survey	PHO	780 m	MPC · JPL
692466	2014 WO_{490}	—	November 20, 2014	Haleakala	Pan-STARRS 1	·	910 m	MPC · JPL
692467	2014 WN_{491}	—	November 21, 2014	Haleakala	Pan-STARRS 1	·	1.1 km	MPC · JPL
692468	2014 WZ_{494}	—	October 4, 2013	Mount Lemmon	Mount Lemmon Survey	·	1.5 km	MPC · JPL
692469	2014 WB_{496}	—	March 1, 2011	Catalina	CSS	·	1.2 km	MPC · JPL
692470	2014 WW_{500}	—	February 11, 2004	Kitt Peak	Spacewatch	·	1.1 km	MPC · JPL
692471	2014 WA_{508}	—	June 28, 2013	Haleakala	Pan-STARRS 1	·	3.6 km	MPC · JPL
692472	2014 WG_{516}	—	November 26, 2014	Haleakala	Pan-STARRS 1	ADE	1.4 km	MPC · JPL
692473	2014 WR_{516}	—	October 9, 2008	Mount Lemmon	Mount Lemmon Survey	·	2.5 km	MPC · JPL
692474	2014 WC_{522}	—	November 22, 2014	Haleakala	Pan-STARRS 1	EOS	1.4 km	MPC · JPL
692475	2014 WJ_{529}	—	March 13, 2007	Kitt Peak	Spacewatch	·	1.1 km	MPC · JPL
692476	2014 WO_{533}	—	November 28, 2014	Haleakala	Pan-STARRS 1	ADE	1.4 km	MPC · JPL
692477	2014 WV_{534}	—	October 3, 2013	Mount Lemmon	Mount Lemmon Survey	SYL	3.6 km	MPC · JPL
692478	2014 WL_{535}	—	November 27, 2014	Haleakala	Pan-STARRS 1	H	540 m	MPC · JPL
692479	2014 WY_{535}	—	November 23, 2014	Haleakala	Pan-STARRS 1	SDO	219 km	MPC · JPL
692480	2014 WQ_{538}	—	November 26, 2014	Haleakala	Pan-STARRS 1	HNS	970 m	MPC · JPL
692481	2014 WC_{541}	—	November 28, 2014	Haleakala	Pan-STARRS 1	·	2.3 km	MPC · JPL
692482	2014 WG_{546}	—	November 27, 2014	Haleakala	Pan-STARRS 1	·	1.1 km	MPC · JPL
692483	2014 WR_{563}	—	November 26, 2014	Haleakala	Pan-STARRS 1	MAR	710 m	MPC · JPL
692484	2014 WC_{567}	—	November 22, 2014	Haleakala	Pan-STARRS 1	·	940 m	MPC · JPL
692485	2014 WP_{567}	—	November 26, 2014	Haleakala	Pan-STARRS 1	·	860 m	MPC · JPL
692486	2014 WM_{568}	—	November 22, 2014	Haleakala	Pan-STARRS 1	·	1.1 km	MPC · JPL
692487	2014 WM_{569}	—	November 16, 2014	Mount Lemmon	Mount Lemmon Survey	·	910 m	MPC · JPL
692488	2014 WM_{571}	—	November 17, 2014	Haleakala	Pan-STARRS 1	ADE	1.3 km	MPC · JPL
692489	2014 WU_{571}	—	November 29, 2014	Mount Lemmon	Mount Lemmon Survey	·	670 m	MPC · JPL
692490	2014 WX_{575}	—	November 17, 2014	Haleakala	Pan-STARRS 1	·	1.4 km	MPC · JPL
692491	2014 WK_{578}	—	November 17, 2014	Haleakala	Pan-STARRS 1	·	1 km	MPC · JPL
692492	2014 WC_{579}	—	November 28, 2014	Haleakala	Pan-STARRS 1	KON	1.5 km	MPC · JPL
692493	2014 WJ_{579}	—	November 20, 2014	Haleakala	Pan-STARRS 1	·	940 m	MPC · JPL
692494	2014 WM_{580}	—	November 26, 2014	Haleakala	Pan-STARRS 1	·	950 m	MPC · JPL
692495	2014 WS_{580}	—	November 30, 2014	Kitt Peak	Spacewatch	EOS	1.7 km	MPC · JPL
692496	2014 WT_{586}	—	November 29, 2014	Mount Lemmon	Mount Lemmon Survey	·	3.1 km	MPC · JPL
692497	2014 WP_{593}	—	November 17, 2014	Haleakala	Pan-STARRS 1	CLA	1.3 km	MPC · JPL
692498	2014 WH_{595}	—	November 22, 2014	Haleakala	Pan-STARRS 1	MAR	750 m	MPC · JPL
692499	2014 WS_{598}	—	November 27, 2014	Haleakala	Pan-STARRS 1	·	780 m	MPC · JPL
692500	2014 WP_{601}	—	November 17, 2014	Haleakala	Pan-STARRS 1	·	1.1 km	MPC · JPL

== 692501–692600 ==
back to top

Designation			Discovery			Properties		Ref
Permanent	Provisional	Named after	Date	Site	Discoverer(s)	Category	Diam.	Ref
692501	2014 WM_{605}	—	November 27, 2014	Mount Lemmon	Mount Lemmon Survey	·	1.1 km	MPC · JPL
692502	2014 WU_{606}	—	November 26, 2014	Haleakala	Pan-STARRS 1	KON	1.8 km	MPC · JPL
692503	2014 WL_{608}	—	November 20, 2014	Mount Lemmon	Mount Lemmon Survey	·	1.3 km	MPC · JPL
692504	2014 WB_{610}	—	November 22, 2014	Mount Lemmon	Mount Lemmon Survey	·	1.1 km	MPC · JPL
692505	2014 WT_{610}	—	November 26, 2014	Haleakala	Pan-STARRS 1	MAR	780 m	MPC · JPL
692506	2014 XP_{1}	—	September 18, 2010	Mount Lemmon	Mount Lemmon Survey	·	940 m	MPC · JPL
692507	2014 XL_{2}	—	January 10, 2010	Kitt Peak	Spacewatch	·	2.6 km	MPC · JPL
692508	2014 XN_{2}	—	November 22, 2014	Haleakala	Pan-STARRS 1	·	870 m	MPC · JPL
692509	2014 XP_{2}	—	November 17, 2014	Haleakala	Pan-STARRS 1	·	870 m	MPC · JPL
692510	2014 XV_{3}	—	December 1, 2014	Haleakala	Pan-STARRS 1	·	1.1 km	MPC · JPL
692511	2014 XF_{4}	—	August 26, 2009	Catalina	CSS	615	1.7 km	MPC · JPL
692512	2014 XQ_{8}	—	December 8, 2010	Mayhill-ISON	L. Elenin	·	1.2 km	MPC · JPL
692513	2014 XJ_{10}	—	November 4, 2014	Haleakala	Pan-STARRS 1	·	1.3 km	MPC · JPL
692514	2014 XJ_{12}	—	October 12, 2007	Kitt Peak	Spacewatch	·	630 m	MPC · JPL
692515	2014 XX_{22}	—	November 29, 2014	Mount Lemmon	Mount Lemmon Survey	·	1.6 km	MPC · JPL
692516	2014 XF_{23}	—	September 29, 2008	Mount Lemmon	Mount Lemmon Survey	·	2.5 km	MPC · JPL
692517	2014 XV_{24}	—	October 19, 2010	Mount Lemmon	Mount Lemmon Survey	NYS	880 m	MPC · JPL
692518	2014 XF_{25}	—	October 21, 2007	Mount Lemmon	Mount Lemmon Survey	SYL	3.9 km	MPC · JPL
692519	2014 XK_{35}	—	May 16, 2013	Mount Lemmon	Mount Lemmon Survey	MAS	610 m	MPC · JPL
692520	2014 XC_{36}	—	September 23, 2008	Kitt Peak	Spacewatch	·	2.8 km	MPC · JPL
692521	2014 XJ_{36}	—	October 23, 2011	Haleakala	Pan-STARRS 1	H	570 m	MPC · JPL
692522	2014 XT_{38}	—	July 18, 2013	Haleakala	Pan-STARRS 1	·	4.3 km	MPC · JPL
692523	2014 XH_{41}	—	November 8, 2011	Haleakala	Pan-STARRS 1	H	570 m	MPC · JPL
692524	2014 XO_{41}	—	December 1, 2014	Haleakala	Pan-STARRS 1	·	1.1 km	MPC · JPL
692525	2014 XW_{49}	—	December 16, 2006	Mount Lemmon	Mount Lemmon Survey	·	800 m	MPC · JPL
692526	2014 XX_{49}	—	December 10, 2014	Mount Lemmon	Mount Lemmon Survey	·	560 m	MPC · JPL
692527	2014 XY_{49}	—	December 12, 2014	Haleakala	Pan-STARRS 1	·	1 km	MPC · JPL
692528	2014 XW_{50}	—	December 10, 2014	Mount Lemmon	Mount Lemmon Survey	·	1.2 km	MPC · JPL
692529	2014 XC_{51}	—	December 10, 2014	Haleakala	Pan-STARRS 1	·	880 m	MPC · JPL
692530	2014 XX_{51}	—	December 11, 2014	Mount Lemmon	Mount Lemmon Survey	SYL	3.5 km	MPC · JPL
692531	2014 XQ_{54}	—	December 12, 2014	Haleakala	Pan-STARRS 1	·	1.0 km	MPC · JPL
692532	2014 XB_{57}	—	December 10, 2014	Mount Lemmon	Mount Lemmon Survey	EUN	860 m	MPC · JPL
692533	2014 YN_{2}	—	February 11, 2004	Kitt Peak	Spacewatch	VER	3.6 km	MPC · JPL
692534	2014 YQ_{3}	—	November 26, 2014	Haleakala	Pan-STARRS 1	·	3.3 km	MPC · JPL
692535	2014 YX_{3}	—	October 28, 2014	Haleakala	Pan-STARRS 1	·	1.7 km	MPC · JPL
692536	2014 YF_{6}	—	December 8, 2010	Mount Lemmon	Mount Lemmon Survey	·	1.1 km	MPC · JPL
692537	2014 YE_{8}	—	December 1, 2008	Kitt Peak	Spacewatch	·	2.5 km	MPC · JPL
692538	2014 YY_{15}	—	August 8, 2005	Cerro Tololo	Deep Ecliptic Survey	·	1.1 km	MPC · JPL
692539	2014 YC_{19}	—	September 15, 2013	Mount Lemmon	Mount Lemmon Survey	·	2.8 km	MPC · JPL
692540	2014 YU_{19}	—	October 17, 2010	Mount Lemmon	Mount Lemmon Survey	·	970 m	MPC · JPL
692541	2014 YK_{25}	—	November 3, 2010	Mount Lemmon	Mount Lemmon Survey	·	1.0 km	MPC · JPL
692542	2014 YO_{25}	—	November 17, 2014	Mount Lemmon	Mount Lemmon Survey	·	1.3 km	MPC · JPL
692543	2014 YA_{26}	—	December 10, 2014	Mount Lemmon	Mount Lemmon Survey	·	1.5 km	MPC · JPL
692544	2014 YM_{26}	—	July 15, 2004	Cerro Tololo	Deep Ecliptic Survey	·	1.1 km	MPC · JPL
692545	2014 YJ_{33}	—	February 9, 2005	Kitt Peak	Spacewatch	PHO	780 m	MPC · JPL
692546	2014 YK_{37}	—	December 12, 2014	Haleakala	Pan-STARRS 1	·	2.4 km	MPC · JPL
692547	2014 YL_{39}	—	December 1, 2014	Haleakala	Pan-STARRS 1	·	850 m	MPC · JPL
692548	2014 YN_{45}	—	October 1, 2011	Piszkéstető	K. Sárneczky	H	510 m	MPC · JPL
692549	2014 YS_{45}	—	January 19, 2015	Haleakala	Pan-STARRS 1	·	1.3 km	MPC · JPL
692550	2014 YN_{46}	—	January 17, 2007	Kitt Peak	Spacewatch	BRG	1.3 km	MPC · JPL
692551	2014 YR_{47}	—	December 14, 2010	Mount Lemmon	Mount Lemmon Survey	·	1.0 km	MPC · JPL
692552	2014 YS_{54}	—	September 13, 2007	Mount Lemmon	Mount Lemmon Survey	·	2.8 km	MPC · JPL
692553	2014 YS_{56}	—	December 18, 2014	Haleakala	Pan-STARRS 1	JUN	940 m	MPC · JPL
692554	2014 YT_{56}	—	June 14, 2012	Mount Lemmon	Mount Lemmon Survey	HNS	940 m	MPC · JPL
692555	2014 YM_{57}	—	December 21, 2014	Haleakala	Pan-STARRS 1	·	1.1 km	MPC · JPL
692556	2014 YL_{59}	—	January 30, 2011	Mount Lemmon	Mount Lemmon Survey	(5)	850 m	MPC · JPL
692557	2014 YE_{60}	—	December 21, 2014	Haleakala	Pan-STARRS 1	·	1.2 km	MPC · JPL
692558	2014 YH_{60}	—	February 8, 2011	Mount Lemmon	Mount Lemmon Survey	·	1.1 km	MPC · JPL
692559	2014 YB_{62}	—	December 29, 2014	Haleakala	Pan-STARRS 1	·	870 m	MPC · JPL
692560	2014 YY_{63}	—	December 27, 2014	Haleakala	Pan-STARRS 1	H	450 m	MPC · JPL
692561	2014 YF_{64}	—	September 10, 2007	Mount Lemmon	Mount Lemmon Survey	URS	3.0 km	MPC · JPL
692562	2014 YA_{75}	—	December 21, 2014	Haleakala	Pan-STARRS 1	·	2.3 km	MPC · JPL
692563	2014 YQ_{77}	—	December 20, 2014	Haleakala	Pan-STARRS 1	·	990 m	MPC · JPL
692564	2014 YZ_{77}	—	December 29, 2014	Mount Lemmon	Mount Lemmon Survey	·	870 m	MPC · JPL
692565	2014 YP_{78}	—	December 26, 2014	Haleakala	Pan-STARRS 1	·	820 m	MPC · JPL
692566	2014 YG_{79}	—	December 29, 2014	Haleakala	Pan-STARRS 1	·	1.1 km	MPC · JPL
692567	2014 YL_{79}	—	December 21, 2014	Haleakala	Pan-STARRS 1	·	980 m	MPC · JPL
692568	2014 YM_{79}	—	December 23, 2014	Mount Lemmon	Mount Lemmon Survey	·	760 m	MPC · JPL
692569	2014 YA_{80}	—	December 20, 2014	Haleakala	Pan-STARRS 1	·	820 m	MPC · JPL
692570	2014 YB_{80}	—	December 26, 2014	Haleakala	Pan-STARRS 1	HNS	960 m	MPC · JPL
692571	2014 YM_{80}	—	March 29, 2008	Mount Lemmon	Mount Lemmon Survey	3:2	4.4 km	MPC · JPL
692572	2014 YB_{81}	—	December 21, 2014	Haleakala	Pan-STARRS 1	·	2.1 km	MPC · JPL
692573	2014 YL_{82}	—	December 21, 2014	Haleakala	Pan-STARRS 1	·	960 m	MPC · JPL
692574	2014 YQ_{82}	—	December 18, 2014	Haleakala	Pan-STARRS 1	KON	1.8 km	MPC · JPL
692575	2014 YF_{84}	—	December 29, 2014	Haleakala	Pan-STARRS 1	·	1.1 km	MPC · JPL
692576	2014 YK_{88}	—	February 8, 2011	Mount Lemmon	Mount Lemmon Survey	·	1.4 km	MPC · JPL
692577	2014 YW_{90}	—	December 28, 2014	Mount Lemmon	Mount Lemmon Survey	T_{j} (2.98) · 3:2	4.1 km	MPC · JPL
692578	2014 YZ_{90}	—	December 21, 2014	Haleakala	Pan-STARRS 1	·	920 m	MPC · JPL
692579	2014 YV_{91}	—	December 29, 2014	Haleakala	Pan-STARRS 1	·	880 m	MPC · JPL
692580	2014 YU_{93}	—	December 16, 2014	Haleakala	Pan-STARRS 1	MAR	810 m	MPC · JPL
692581	2014 YJ_{94}	—	December 29, 2014	Haleakala	Pan-STARRS 1	·	1.6 km	MPC · JPL
692582	2014 YU_{96}	—	January 10, 2006	Mount Lemmon	Mount Lemmon Survey	HNS	850 m	MPC · JPL
692583	2014 YV_{99}	—	December 16, 2014	Haleakala	Pan-STARRS 1	MAR	690 m	MPC · JPL
692584	2015 AN_{3}	—	December 3, 2008	Mount Lemmon	Mount Lemmon Survey	·	4.0 km	MPC · JPL
692585	2015 AZ_{3}	—	November 22, 2014	Haleakala	Pan-STARRS 1	·	970 m	MPC · JPL
692586	2015 AL_{13}	—	September 18, 2001	Apache Point	SDSS Collaboration	MAR	840 m	MPC · JPL
692587	2015 AR_{13}	—	November 21, 2014	Haleakala	Pan-STARRS 1	·	1.1 km	MPC · JPL
692588	2015 AR_{20}	—	November 20, 2014	Haleakala	Pan-STARRS 1	·	2.7 km	MPC · JPL
692589	2015 AK_{21}	—	November 26, 2014	Haleakala	Pan-STARRS 1	·	2.6 km	MPC · JPL
692590	2015 AW_{22}	—	October 27, 2008	Mount Lemmon	Mount Lemmon Survey	·	2.7 km	MPC · JPL
692591	2015 AP_{23}	—	November 26, 2014	Haleakala	Pan-STARRS 1	·	1.1 km	MPC · JPL
692592	2015 AR_{25}	—	December 19, 2014	Haleakala	Pan-STARRS 1	HNS	740 m	MPC · JPL
692593	2015 AE_{26}	—	January 12, 2015	Haleakala	Pan-STARRS 1	·	1.3 km	MPC · JPL
692594	2015 AR_{27}	—	January 13, 2015	Haleakala	Pan-STARRS 1	·	2.1 km	MPC · JPL
692595	2015 AU_{27}	—	March 31, 2011	Mount Lemmon	Mount Lemmon Survey	·	3.5 km	MPC · JPL
692596	2015 AV_{27}	—	January 13, 2015	Haleakala	Pan-STARRS 1	·	1.2 km	MPC · JPL
692597	2015 AA_{31}	—	December 21, 2014	Haleakala	Pan-STARRS 1	·	1.4 km	MPC · JPL
692598	2015 AV_{31}	—	December 5, 2010	Mount Lemmon	Mount Lemmon Survey	·	1.1 km	MPC · JPL
692599	2015 AF_{34}	—	May 21, 2012	Haleakala	Pan-STARRS 1	·	2.9 km	MPC · JPL
692600	2015 AH_{34}	—	September 13, 2013	Mount Lemmon	Mount Lemmon Survey	·	970 m	MPC · JPL

== 692601–692700 ==
back to top

Designation			Discovery			Properties		Ref
Permanent	Provisional	Named after	Date	Site	Discoverer(s)	Category	Diam.	Ref
692601	2015 AK_{36}	—	January 14, 2011	Mount Lemmon	Mount Lemmon Survey	·	690 m	MPC · JPL
692602	2015 AR_{37}	—	January 13, 2015	Haleakala	Pan-STARRS 1	·	2.0 km	MPC · JPL
692603	2015 AG_{42}	—	January 14, 2015	Haleakala	Pan-STARRS 1	·	2.2 km	MPC · JPL
692604	2015 AJ_{42}	—	May 16, 2012	Kitt Peak	Spacewatch	EOS	1.6 km	MPC · JPL
692605	2015 AD_{47}	—	November 1, 2014	Mount Lemmon	Mount Lemmon Survey	H	430 m	MPC · JPL
692606	2015 AA_{50}	—	January 27, 2007	Kitt Peak	Spacewatch	·	910 m	MPC · JPL
692607	2015 AV_{50}	—	January 13, 2015	Haleakala	Pan-STARRS 1	·	850 m	MPC · JPL
692608	2015 AR_{51}	—	January 13, 2015	Haleakala	Pan-STARRS 1	ADE	1.4 km	MPC · JPL
692609	2015 AE_{53}	—	September 26, 2006	Catalina	CSS	·	1.1 km	MPC · JPL
692610	2015 AE_{56}	—	December 26, 2014	Haleakala	Pan-STARRS 1	·	1.0 km	MPC · JPL
692611	2015 AG_{58}	—	April 8, 2008	Mount Lemmon	Mount Lemmon Survey	NYS	1.1 km	MPC · JPL
692612	2015 AX_{64}	—	January 13, 2015	Haleakala	Pan-STARRS 1	3:2 · SHU	4.7 km	MPC · JPL
692613	2015 AR_{67}	—	January 13, 2015	Haleakala	Pan-STARRS 1	·	1.1 km	MPC · JPL
692614	2015 AT_{69}	—	June 23, 2012	Mount Lemmon	Mount Lemmon Survey	·	2.6 km	MPC · JPL
692615	2015 AU_{71}	—	January 30, 2011	Mount Lemmon	Mount Lemmon Survey	·	950 m	MPC · JPL
692616	2015 AB_{73}	—	January 13, 2015	Haleakala	Pan-STARRS 1	·	890 m	MPC · JPL
692617	2015 AC_{76}	—	January 13, 2015	Haleakala	Pan-STARRS 1	MAR	750 m	MPC · JPL
692618	2015 AR_{76}	—	February 25, 2011	Kitt Peak	Spacewatch	(13314)	2.0 km	MPC · JPL
692619	2015 AQ_{77}	—	August 27, 2005	Kitt Peak	Spacewatch	·	1 km	MPC · JPL
692620	2015 AQ_{78}	—	February 23, 2007	Mount Lemmon	Mount Lemmon Survey	·	930 m	MPC · JPL
692621	2015 AP_{79}	—	January 1, 2009	Mount Lemmon	Mount Lemmon Survey	·	2.9 km	MPC · JPL
692622	2015 AW_{80}	—	January 13, 2015	Haleakala	Pan-STARRS 1	KOR	980 m	MPC · JPL
692623	2015 AK_{81}	—	December 21, 2014	Haleakala	Pan-STARRS 1	·	810 m	MPC · JPL
692624	2015 AO_{87}	—	February 4, 2005	Kitt Peak	Spacewatch	·	580 m	MPC · JPL
692625	2015 AZ_{89}	—	March 26, 2011	Mount Lemmon	Mount Lemmon Survey	EOS	1.8 km	MPC · JPL
692626	2015 AC_{95}	—	January 14, 2015	Haleakala	Pan-STARRS 1	·	940 m	MPC · JPL
692627	2015 AX_{102}	—	April 26, 2008	Mount Lemmon	Mount Lemmon Survey	MAS	540 m	MPC · JPL
692628	2015 AE_{104}	—	September 30, 2013	Calar Alto-CASADO	Mottola, S., Proffe, G.	·	2.4 km	MPC · JPL
692629	2015 AQ_{105}	—	December 21, 2014	Mount Lemmon	Mount Lemmon Survey	·	940 m	MPC · JPL
692630	2015 AM_{110}	—	February 28, 2008	Mount Lemmon	Mount Lemmon Survey	3:2	4.3 km	MPC · JPL
692631	2015 AF_{111}	—	December 21, 2014	Haleakala	Pan-STARRS 1	EOS	1.5 km	MPC · JPL
692632	2015 AM_{111}	—	February 8, 2011	Mount Lemmon	Mount Lemmon Survey	·	1.2 km	MPC · JPL
692633	2015 AC_{112}	—	April 30, 2011	Haleakala	Pan-STARRS 1	EOS	1.9 km	MPC · JPL
692634	2015 AG_{118}	—	June 4, 2011	Mount Lemmon	Mount Lemmon Survey	VER	2.9 km	MPC · JPL
692635	2015 AQ_{118}	—	January 28, 2007	Mount Lemmon	Mount Lemmon Survey	·	820 m	MPC · JPL
692636	2015 AL_{122}	—	January 14, 2015	Haleakala	Pan-STARRS 1	EUN	890 m	MPC · JPL
692637	2015 AD_{125}	—	November 5, 2013	Palomar	Palomar Transient Factory	·	3.2 km	MPC · JPL
692638	2015 AF_{128}	—	December 21, 2014	Haleakala	Pan-STARRS 1	·	1.4 km	MPC · JPL
692639	2015 AY_{128}	—	October 21, 2006	Mount Lemmon	Mount Lemmon Survey	·	3.6 km	MPC · JPL
692640	2015 AN_{129}	—	December 21, 2014	Mount Lemmon	Mount Lemmon Survey	3:2	3.5 km	MPC · JPL
692641	2015 AU_{129}	—	February 13, 2007	Mount Lemmon	Mount Lemmon Survey	·	810 m	MPC · JPL
692642	2015 AQ_{130}	—	October 9, 2007	Mount Lemmon	Mount Lemmon Survey	THM	2.6 km	MPC · JPL
692643	2015 AN_{133}	—	February 7, 2011	Mount Lemmon	Mount Lemmon Survey	·	750 m	MPC · JPL
692644	2015 AV_{135}	—	May 29, 2008	Kitt Peak	Spacewatch	·	1.1 km	MPC · JPL
692645	2015 AK_{136}	—	December 4, 2008	Mount Lemmon	Mount Lemmon Survey	·	2.4 km	MPC · JPL
692646	2015 AZ_{136}	—	May 4, 2005	Mauna Kea	Veillet, C.	·	2.2 km	MPC · JPL
692647	2015 AS_{138}	—	March 28, 2008	Mount Lemmon	Mount Lemmon Survey	3:2	4.1 km	MPC · JPL
692648	2015 AN_{141}	—	January 14, 2015	Haleakala	Pan-STARRS 1	·	1.5 km	MPC · JPL
692649	2015 AD_{144}	—	December 21, 2014	Haleakala	Pan-STARRS 1	ADE	1.5 km	MPC · JPL
692650	2015 AS_{145}	—	April 11, 2005	Mount Lemmon	Mount Lemmon Survey	·	920 m	MPC · JPL
692651	2015 AY_{152}	—	September 15, 2013	Mount Lemmon	Mount Lemmon Survey	·	1.4 km	MPC · JPL
692652	2015 AD_{163}	—	January 14, 2015	Haleakala	Pan-STARRS 1	·	740 m	MPC · JPL
692653	2015 AX_{170}	—	March 11, 2007	Kitt Peak	Spacewatch	·	1.0 km	MPC · JPL
692654	2015 AZ_{176}	—	August 27, 2009	Kitt Peak	Spacewatch	V	540 m	MPC · JPL
692655	2015 AB_{185}	—	January 28, 2007	Mount Lemmon	Mount Lemmon Survey	·	880 m	MPC · JPL
692656	2015 AT_{187}	—	December 24, 2006	Kitt Peak	Spacewatch	·	1.0 km	MPC · JPL
692657	2015 AL_{189}	—	January 14, 2011	Kitt Peak	Spacewatch	·	680 m	MPC · JPL
692658	2015 AT_{193}	—	January 14, 2015	Haleakala	Pan-STARRS 1	EOS	1.5 km	MPC · JPL
692659	2015 AO_{194}	—	January 27, 2007	Kitt Peak	Spacewatch	·	1.0 km	MPC · JPL
692660	2015 AF_{200}	—	October 10, 2004	Kitt Peak	Deep Ecliptic Survey	DOR	2.7 km	MPC · JPL
692661	2015 AZ_{201}	—	January 14, 2015	Haleakala	Pan-STARRS 1	·	1.0 km	MPC · JPL
692662	2015 AQ_{202}	—	February 13, 2010	Mount Lemmon	Mount Lemmon Survey	·	3.3 km	MPC · JPL
692663	2015 AA_{205}	—	January 14, 2011	Kitt Peak	Spacewatch	·	890 m	MPC · JPL
692664	2015 AB_{207}	—	November 10, 2014	Haleakala	Pan-STARRS 1	H	490 m	MPC · JPL
692665	2015 AA_{209}	—	October 26, 2014	Haleakala	Pan-STARRS 1	·	2.5 km	MPC · JPL
692666	2015 AU_{210}	—	January 15, 2015	Haleakala	Pan-STARRS 1	PHO	1.1 km	MPC · JPL
692667	2015 AV_{210}	—	December 16, 2014	Haleakala	Pan-STARRS 1	·	1.3 km	MPC · JPL
692668	2015 AG_{212}	—	December 10, 2014	Haleakala	Pan-STARRS 1	JUN	660 m	MPC · JPL
692669	2015 AA_{214}	—	July 16, 2013	Haleakala	Pan-STARRS 1	·	880 m	MPC · JPL
692670	2015 AV_{215}	—	December 16, 2014	Haleakala	Pan-STARRS 1	·	1.1 km	MPC · JPL
692671	2015 AP_{216}	—	December 11, 2014	Haleakala	Pan-STARRS 1	H	470 m	MPC · JPL
692672	2015 AF_{219}	—	January 15, 2015	Haleakala	Pan-STARRS 1	MAR	970 m	MPC · JPL
692673	2015 AO_{219}	—	January 15, 2015	Haleakala	Pan-STARRS 1	·	880 m	MPC · JPL
692674	2015 AO_{221}	—	January 15, 2015	Haleakala	Pan-STARRS 1	ADE	1.2 km	MPC · JPL
692675	2015 AH_{222}	—	January 15, 2015	Mount Lemmon	Mount Lemmon Survey	MAR	950 m	MPC · JPL
692676	2015 AR_{224}	—	October 1, 2013	Mount Lemmon	Mount Lemmon Survey	·	1.2 km	MPC · JPL
692677	2015 AF_{227}	—	January 15, 2015	Haleakala	Pan-STARRS 1	·	1.2 km	MPC · JPL
692678	2015 AM_{229}	—	January 15, 2015	Haleakala	Pan-STARRS 1	EUN	1.1 km	MPC · JPL
692679	2015 AP_{229}	—	June 6, 2011	Mount Lemmon	Mount Lemmon Survey	·	3.2 km	MPC · JPL
692680	2015 AY_{237}	—	February 11, 2011	Mount Lemmon	Mount Lemmon Survey	·	920 m	MPC · JPL
692681	2015 AX_{240}	—	January 15, 2015	Haleakala	Pan-STARRS 1	·	1.1 km	MPC · JPL
692682	2015 AC_{241}	—	January 15, 2015	Haleakala	Pan-STARRS 1	·	1.1 km	MPC · JPL
692683	2015 AW_{241}	—	January 15, 2015	Haleakala	Pan-STARRS 1	·	1.4 km	MPC · JPL
692684	2015 AM_{242}	—	January 15, 2015	Haleakala	Pan-STARRS 1	·	1.1 km	MPC · JPL
692685	2015 AB_{247}	—	January 7, 2010	Mount Lemmon	Mount Lemmon Survey	VER	2.4 km	MPC · JPL
692686	2015 AD_{251}	—	February 12, 2011	Mount Lemmon	Mount Lemmon Survey	·	1 km	MPC · JPL
692687	2015 AU_{253}	—	January 14, 2015	Haleakala	Pan-STARRS 1	RAF	760 m	MPC · JPL
692688	2015 AU_{265}	—	January 13, 2015	Haleakala	Pan-STARRS 1	·	1.1 km	MPC · JPL
692689	2015 AB_{268}	—	January 13, 2015	Haleakala	Pan-STARRS 1	MAS	570 m	MPC · JPL
692690	2015 AP_{268}	—	January 19, 2004	Kitt Peak	Spacewatch	·	3.4 km	MPC · JPL
692691	2015 AQ_{269}	—	October 12, 2013	Catalina	CSS	·	2.8 km	MPC · JPL
692692	2015 AX_{274}	—	October 1, 2005	Mount Lemmon	Mount Lemmon Survey	(5)	870 m	MPC · JPL
692693	2015 AA_{278}	—	November 17, 2009	Mount Lemmon	Mount Lemmon Survey	·	1.0 km	MPC · JPL
692694	2015 AT_{280}	—	November 26, 2014	Haleakala	Pan-STARRS 1	JUN	970 m	MPC · JPL
692695	2015 AO_{282}	—	January 11, 2015	Haleakala	Pan-STARRS 1	H	480 m	MPC · JPL
692696	2015 AK_{283}	—	February 26, 2007	Mount Lemmon	Mount Lemmon Survey	·	1.2 km	MPC · JPL
692697	2015 AZ_{283}	—	January 27, 2015	Haleakala	Pan-STARRS 1	·	980 m	MPC · JPL
692698	2015 AD_{284}	—	September 20, 2014	Haleakala	Pan-STARRS 1	·	870 m	MPC · JPL
692699	2015 AV_{285}	—	November 21, 2005	Kitt Peak	Spacewatch	·	940 m	MPC · JPL
692700	2015 AS_{288}	—	May 16, 2012	Kitt Peak	Spacewatch	·	1.5 km	MPC · JPL

== 692701–692800 ==
back to top

Designation			Discovery			Properties		Ref
Permanent	Provisional	Named after	Date	Site	Discoverer(s)	Category	Diam.	Ref
692701	2015 AG_{293}	—	October 28, 2005	Kitt Peak	Spacewatch	·	1.2 km	MPC · JPL
692702	2015 AG_{299}	—	January 15, 2015	Haleakala	Pan-STARRS 1	·	930 m	MPC · JPL
692703	2015 AT_{299}	—	January 14, 2015	Haleakala	Pan-STARRS 1	L5	7.4 km	MPC · JPL
692704	2015 AS_{301}	—	January 9, 2015	Haleakala	Pan-STARRS 1	·	910 m	MPC · JPL
692705	2015 AD_{304}	—	January 15, 2015	Haleakala	Pan-STARRS 1	·	1.2 km	MPC · JPL
692706	2015 AY_{304}	—	June 25, 2008	Siding Spring	SSS	·	1.3 km	MPC · JPL
692707	2015 AB_{306}	—	January 17, 2015	Haleakala	Pan-STARRS 1	·	1.3 km	MPC · JPL
692708	2015 AK_{306}	—	January 13, 2015	Haleakala	Pan-STARRS 1	·	980 m	MPC · JPL
692709	2015 BF_{5}	—	June 15, 2012	Mount Lemmon	Mount Lemmon Survey	·	3.5 km	MPC · JPL
692710	2015 BR_{13}	—	April 15, 2005	Catalina	CSS	·	4.1 km	MPC · JPL
692711	2015 BL_{15}	—	October 29, 2002	Palomar	NEAT	THM	2.3 km	MPC · JPL
692712	2015 BH_{16}	—	February 10, 2011	Mount Lemmon	Mount Lemmon Survey	·	770 m	MPC · JPL
692713	2015 BF_{20}	—	January 16, 2015	Kitt Peak	Spacewatch	·	1.1 km	MPC · JPL
692714	2015 BW_{29}	—	January 16, 2015	Haleakala	Pan-STARRS 1	BRG	1.1 km	MPC · JPL
692715	2015 BC_{31}	—	October 5, 2013	Haleakala	Pan-STARRS 1	·	640 m	MPC · JPL
692716	2015 BP_{32}	—	August 31, 2005	Kitt Peak	Spacewatch	·	1.1 km	MPC · JPL
692717	2015 BX_{34}	—	January 16, 2015	Haleakala	Pan-STARRS 1	·	1.5 km	MPC · JPL
692718	2015 BS_{38}	—	March 19, 2010	Kitt Peak	Spacewatch	·	3.4 km	MPC · JPL
692719	2015 BY_{39}	—	January 12, 2011	Kitt Peak	Spacewatch	·	720 m	MPC · JPL
692720	2015 BW_{44}	—	February 7, 2011	Mount Lemmon	Mount Lemmon Survey	·	1.1 km	MPC · JPL
692721	2015 BO_{45}	—	January 10, 2010	Kitt Peak	Spacewatch	·	3.3 km	MPC · JPL
692722	2015 BO_{46}	—	December 17, 2003	Kitt Peak	Spacewatch	·	3.1 km	MPC · JPL
692723	2015 BT_{46}	—	January 17, 2015	Haleakala	Pan-STARRS 1	·	840 m	MPC · JPL
692724	2015 BA_{47}	—	January 8, 2010	Kitt Peak	Spacewatch	·	2.3 km	MPC · JPL
692725	2015 BK_{48}	—	December 16, 2014	Haleakala	Pan-STARRS 1	HNS	900 m	MPC · JPL
692726	2015 BZ_{49}	—	September 10, 2007	Kitt Peak	Spacewatch	·	2.5 km	MPC · JPL
692727	2015 BU_{52}	—	May 7, 2006	Mount Lemmon	Mount Lemmon Survey	EOS	1.6 km	MPC · JPL
692728	2015 BO_{53}	—	January 17, 2015	Mount Lemmon	Mount Lemmon Survey	·	1.0 km	MPC · JPL
692729	2015 BT_{54}	—	March 14, 2011	Mount Lemmon	Mount Lemmon Survey	·	1.1 km	MPC · JPL
692730	2015 BC_{58}	—	October 12, 2005	Kitt Peak	Spacewatch	·	960 m	MPC · JPL
692731	2015 BD_{58}	—	December 2, 2005	Kitt Peak	Spacewatch	·	1.1 km	MPC · JPL
692732	2015 BG_{58}	—	January 17, 2015	Haleakala	Pan-STARRS 1	·	2.6 km	MPC · JPL
692733	2015 BJ_{58}	—	October 29, 2005	Kitt Peak	Spacewatch	·	1.0 km	MPC · JPL
692734	2015 BQ_{60}	—	November 19, 2007	Mount Lemmon	Mount Lemmon Survey	·	540 m	MPC · JPL
692735	2015 BV_{60}	—	January 17, 2015	Haleakala	Pan-STARRS 1	·	1.1 km	MPC · JPL
692736	2015 BW_{62}	—	January 17, 2015	Haleakala	Pan-STARRS 1	RAF	830 m	MPC · JPL
692737	2015 BA_{63}	—	January 17, 2015	Haleakala	Pan-STARRS 1	·	1.1 km	MPC · JPL
692738	2015 BC_{63}	—	January 17, 2015	Haleakala	Pan-STARRS 1	EUN	820 m	MPC · JPL
692739	2015 BX_{64}	—	October 28, 2013	Mount Lemmon	Mount Lemmon Survey	·	2.7 km	MPC · JPL
692740	2015 BJ_{66}	—	February 8, 2011	Mount Lemmon	Mount Lemmon Survey	·	1.1 km	MPC · JPL
692741	2015 BG_{73}	—	March 29, 2012	Haleakala	Pan-STARRS 1	·	1.2 km	MPC · JPL
692742	2015 BF_{80}	—	April 30, 2011	Mount Lemmon	Mount Lemmon Survey	·	3.3 km	MPC · JPL
692743	2015 BH_{80}	—	April 1, 2012	Mount Lemmon	Mount Lemmon Survey	·	1.1 km	MPC · JPL
692744	2015 BH_{82}	—	January 18, 2015	Mount Lemmon	Mount Lemmon Survey	·	2.6 km	MPC · JPL
692745	2015 BS_{82}	—	January 18, 2015	Mount Lemmon	Mount Lemmon Survey	·	1.1 km	MPC · JPL
692746	2015 BS_{85}	—	January 18, 2015	Mount Lemmon	Mount Lemmon Survey	·	2.5 km	MPC · JPL
692747	2015 BT_{88}	—	January 18, 2015	Haleakala	Pan-STARRS 1	EUN	1.1 km	MPC · JPL
692748	2015 BU_{94}	—	January 16, 2015	Mount Lemmon	Mount Lemmon Survey	AGN	920 m	MPC · JPL
692749	2015 BA_{97}	—	January 30, 2011	Kitt Peak	Spacewatch	·	970 m	MPC · JPL
692750	2015 BA_{98}	—	December 26, 2014	Haleakala	Pan-STARRS 1	·	980 m	MPC · JPL
692751	2015 BN_{102}	—	February 23, 2001	Cerro Tololo	Deep Lens Survey	KOR	1.2 km	MPC · JPL
692752	2015 BV_{117}	—	January 27, 2011	Mount Lemmon	Mount Lemmon Survey	·	880 m	MPC · JPL
692753	2015 BV_{135}	—	March 20, 1999	Apache Point	SDSS	·	980 m	MPC · JPL
692754	2015 BL_{144}	—	December 18, 2014	Haleakala	Pan-STARRS 1	EUN	820 m	MPC · JPL
692755	2015 BM_{147}	—	December 15, 2001	Apache Point	SDSS Collaboration	·	1.1 km	MPC · JPL
692756	2015 BF_{148}	—	January 17, 2015	Haleakala	Pan-STARRS 1	·	1.0 km	MPC · JPL
692757	2015 BB_{151}	—	January 17, 2015	Haleakala	Pan-STARRS 1	MAR	860 m	MPC · JPL
692758	2015 BU_{151}	—	January 17, 2015	Haleakala	Pan-STARRS 1	·	910 m	MPC · JPL
692759	2015 BW_{152}	—	February 22, 2011	Kitt Peak	Spacewatch	·	1.3 km	MPC · JPL
692760	2015 BG_{164}	—	November 17, 2009	Mount Lemmon	Mount Lemmon Survey	·	1 km	MPC · JPL
692761	2015 BR_{166}	—	January 17, 2015	Haleakala	Pan-STARRS 1	·	780 m	MPC · JPL
692762	2015 BZ_{168}	—	February 10, 2011	Mount Lemmon	Mount Lemmon Survey	·	860 m	MPC · JPL
692763	2015 BS_{169}	—	March 2, 2011	Kitt Peak	Spacewatch	·	990 m	MPC · JPL
692764	2015 BG_{174}	—	February 25, 2007	Kitt Peak	Spacewatch	·	840 m	MPC · JPL
692765	2015 BQ_{174}	—	January 17, 2015	Haleakala	Pan-STARRS 1	KOR	970 m	MPC · JPL
692766	2015 BM_{186}	—	October 11, 2012	Mount Lemmon	Mount Lemmon Survey	·	3.2 km	MPC · JPL
692767	2015 BP_{190}	—	September 5, 2008	Kitt Peak	Spacewatch	EUN	870 m	MPC · JPL
692768	2015 BQ_{193}	—	September 29, 2010	Mount Lemmon	Mount Lemmon Survey	·	520 m	MPC · JPL
692769	2015 BO_{195}	—	January 17, 2015	Haleakala	Pan-STARRS 1	·	1.1 km	MPC · JPL
692770	2015 BG_{197}	—	September 20, 2001	Kitt Peak	Spacewatch	·	2.0 km	MPC · JPL
692771	2015 BD_{198}	—	March 25, 2010	Kitt Peak	Spacewatch	·	2.5 km	MPC · JPL
692772	2015 BL_{200}	—	January 17, 2015	Haleakala	Pan-STARRS 1	·	900 m	MPC · JPL
692773	2015 BL_{201}	—	January 17, 2015	Haleakala	Pan-STARRS 1	BRG	1.2 km	MPC · JPL
692774	2015 BV_{204}	—	October 8, 2008	Kitt Peak	Spacewatch	·	2.2 km	MPC · JPL
692775	2015 BW_{204}	—	January 28, 2007	Kitt Peak	Spacewatch	·	780 m	MPC · JPL
692776	2015 BE_{210}	—	February 10, 2008	Kitt Peak	Spacewatch	·	940 m	MPC · JPL
692777	2015 BC_{211}	—	December 12, 2006	Mount Lemmon	Mount Lemmon Survey	·	1.2 km	MPC · JPL
692778	2015 BN_{212}	—	September 10, 2013	Haleakala	Pan-STARRS 1	·	1.4 km	MPC · JPL
692779	2015 BG_{213}	—	December 26, 2014	Oukaïmeden	C. Rinner	ADE	1.8 km	MPC · JPL
692780	2015 BV_{214}	—	February 13, 2011	Mount Lemmon	Mount Lemmon Survey	·	930 m	MPC · JPL
692781	2015 BO_{215}	—	January 9, 2011	Charleston	R. Holmes	·	1.1 km	MPC · JPL
692782	2015 BP_{216}	—	April 22, 2009	Mount Lemmon	Mount Lemmon Survey	·	760 m	MPC · JPL
692783	2015 BZ_{216}	—	January 18, 2015	Haleakala	Pan-STARRS 1	·	2.5 km	MPC · JPL
692784	2015 BK_{217}	—	September 13, 2005	Kitt Peak	Spacewatch	·	960 m	MPC · JPL
692785	2015 BP_{220}	—	December 26, 2014	Haleakala	Pan-STARRS 1	·	1.2 km	MPC · JPL
692786	2015 BC_{225}	—	January 29, 2011	Mount Lemmon	Mount Lemmon Survey	·	790 m	MPC · JPL
692787	2015 BQ_{225}	—	October 1, 2005	Mount Lemmon	Mount Lemmon Survey	3:2	4.1 km	MPC · JPL
692788	2015 BQ_{226}	—	November 13, 2010	Mount Lemmon	Mount Lemmon Survey	·	910 m	MPC · JPL
692789	2015 BY_{230}	—	December 21, 2014	Haleakala	Pan-STARRS 1	·	2.8 km	MPC · JPL
692790	2015 BJ_{231}	—	September 25, 2006	Catalina	CSS	·	1.4 km	MPC · JPL
692791	2015 BQ_{232}	—	December 29, 2014	Haleakala	Pan-STARRS 1	·	1.0 km	MPC · JPL
692792	2015 BA_{238}	—	November 10, 2005	Kitt Peak	Spacewatch	3:2	4.5 km	MPC · JPL
692793	2015 BS_{240}	—	April 2, 2000	Kitt Peak	Spacewatch	·	1.1 km	MPC · JPL
692794	2015 BL_{243}	—	January 18, 2015	Haleakala	Pan-STARRS 1	MAR	770 m	MPC · JPL
692795	2015 BV_{243}	—	February 5, 2011	Haleakala	Pan-STARRS 1	·	990 m	MPC · JPL
692796	2015 BH_{244}	—	February 6, 2011	Mount Lemmon	Mount Lemmon Survey	·	1.2 km	MPC · JPL
692797	2015 BJ_{249}	—	March 13, 2010	Mount Lemmon	Mount Lemmon Survey	THM	2.2 km	MPC · JPL
692798	2015 BS_{249}	—	February 25, 2011	Mount Lemmon	Mount Lemmon Survey	·	1.2 km	MPC · JPL
692799	2015 BR_{256}	—	November 25, 2005	Mount Lemmon	Mount Lemmon Survey	·	1.1 km	MPC · JPL
692800	2015 BH_{257}	—	February 2, 2009	Mount Lemmon	Mount Lemmon Survey	·	2.6 km	MPC · JPL

== 692801–692900 ==
back to top

Designation			Discovery			Properties		Ref
Permanent	Provisional	Named after	Date	Site	Discoverer(s)	Category	Diam.	Ref
692801	2015 BV_{257}	—	January 18, 2015	Haleakala	Pan-STARRS 1	·	960 m	MPC · JPL
692802	2015 BB_{258}	—	January 18, 2015	Haleakala	Pan-STARRS 1	·	1.0 km	MPC · JPL
692803	2015 BM_{260}	—	January 18, 2015	Haleakala	Pan-STARRS 1	·	1.2 km	MPC · JPL
692804	2015 BB_{263}	—	June 15, 2004	Socorro	LINEAR	·	1.3 km	MPC · JPL
692805	2015 BP_{267}	—	November 10, 2014	Haleakala	Pan-STARRS 1	T_{j} (2.99) · EUP	2.8 km	MPC · JPL
692806	2015 BA_{268}	—	June 20, 2013	Mount Lemmon	Mount Lemmon Survey	·	3.1 km	MPC · JPL
692807	2015 BP_{276}	—	February 26, 2009	Kitt Peak	Spacewatch	·	3.6 km	MPC · JPL
692808	2015 BF_{280}	—	January 19, 2015	Haleakala	Pan-STARRS 1	·	2.5 km	MPC · JPL
692809	2015 BM_{280}	—	November 9, 2005	Piszkéstető	K. Sárneczky	·	1.2 km	MPC · JPL
692810	2015 BN_{282}	—	January 19, 2015	Haleakala	Pan-STARRS 1	·	1.3 km	MPC · JPL
692811	2015 BV_{285}	—	February 11, 2011	Mount Lemmon	Mount Lemmon Survey	·	1.1 km	MPC · JPL
692812	2015 BY_{285}	—	December 18, 2014	Haleakala	Pan-STARRS 1	·	1.2 km	MPC · JPL
692813	2015 BA_{289}	—	September 14, 2013	Haleakala	Pan-STARRS 1	MAR	840 m	MPC · JPL
692814	2015 BW_{297}	—	January 19, 2015	Haleakala	Pan-STARRS 1	HNS	730 m	MPC · JPL
692815	2015 BS_{301}	—	January 19, 2015	Haleakala	Pan-STARRS 1	·	1.4 km	MPC · JPL
692816	2015 BZ_{301}	—	June 19, 2012	ESA OGS	ESA OGS	HNS	1.1 km	MPC · JPL
692817	2015 BM_{307}	—	January 20, 2015	Mount Lemmon	Mount Lemmon Survey	RAF	820 m	MPC · JPL
692818	2015 BK_{308}	—	October 25, 2005	Mount Lemmon	Mount Lemmon Survey	·	870 m	MPC · JPL
692819	2015 BV_{313}	—	January 16, 2015	Haleakala	Pan-STARRS 1	·	1.0 km	MPC · JPL
692820	2015 BQ_{315}	—	December 29, 2014	Haleakala	Pan-STARRS 1	·	980 m	MPC · JPL
692821	2015 BR_{322}	—	February 13, 2011	Mount Lemmon	Mount Lemmon Survey	·	1 km	MPC · JPL
692822	2015 BG_{323}	—	July 31, 2009	Siding Spring	SSS	·	1.1 km	MPC · JPL
692823	2015 BB_{326}	—	September 9, 2007	Kitt Peak	Spacewatch	·	2.9 km	MPC · JPL
692824	2015 BO_{328}	—	July 21, 2006	Mount Lemmon	Mount Lemmon Survey	·	2.9 km	MPC · JPL
692825	2015 BT_{328}	—	February 12, 2011	Mount Lemmon	Mount Lemmon Survey	·	910 m	MPC · JPL
692826	2015 BV_{328}	—	October 27, 2005	Mount Lemmon	Mount Lemmon Survey	·	780 m	MPC · JPL
692827	2015 BV_{329}	—	January 17, 2015	Kitt Peak	Spacewatch	ADE	1.3 km	MPC · JPL
692828	2015 BB_{330}	—	November 19, 2006	Kitt Peak	Spacewatch	·	1.1 km	MPC · JPL
692829	2015 BW_{330}	—	January 17, 2015	Haleakala	Pan-STARRS 1	·	1.1 km	MPC · JPL
692830	2015 BZ_{338}	—	April 15, 2007	Mount Lemmon	Mount Lemmon Survey	·	1.0 km	MPC · JPL
692831	2015 BG_{343}	—	January 17, 2015	Haleakala	Pan-STARRS 1	·	980 m	MPC · JPL
692832	2015 BE_{344}	—	October 22, 2006	Kitt Peak	Spacewatch	·	1.2 km	MPC · JPL
692833	2015 BG_{346}	—	September 16, 2010	Kitt Peak	Spacewatch	·	690 m	MPC · JPL
692834	2015 BL_{347}	—	August 23, 2007	Kitt Peak	Spacewatch	VER	2.3 km	MPC · JPL
692835	2015 BX_{349}	—	October 28, 2010	Piszkés-tető	K. Sárneczky, S. Kürti	·	700 m	MPC · JPL
692836	2015 BO_{351}	—	April 12, 2011	Mount Lemmon	Mount Lemmon Survey	·	2.7 km	MPC · JPL
692837	2015 BL_{352}	—	November 8, 2009	Mount Lemmon	Mount Lemmon Survey	·	1.1 km	MPC · JPL
692838	2015 BP_{352}	—	January 18, 2015	Haleakala	Pan-STARRS 1	3:2 · SHU	4.0 km	MPC · JPL
692839	2015 BR_{352}	—	May 25, 2011	Mount Lemmon	Mount Lemmon Survey	·	3.8 km	MPC · JPL
692840	2015 BW_{353}	—	February 8, 2007	Mount Lemmon	Mount Lemmon Survey	3:2	4.5 km	MPC · JPL
692841	2015 BB_{357}	—	October 7, 2005	Catalina	CSS	·	1.2 km	MPC · JPL
692842	2015 BA_{360}	—	November 1, 2013	Catalina	CSS	TIR	3.0 km	MPC · JPL
692843	2015 BE_{360}	—	January 20, 2015	Haleakala	Pan-STARRS 1	·	790 m	MPC · JPL
692844	2015 BJ_{367}	—	January 20, 2015	Haleakala	Pan-STARRS 1	·	990 m	MPC · JPL
692845	2015 BM_{367}	—	May 25, 2003	Kitt Peak	Spacewatch	·	1.3 km	MPC · JPL
692846	2015 BB_{377}	—	October 1, 2008	Mount Lemmon	Mount Lemmon Survey	EOS	1.8 km	MPC · JPL
692847	2015 BL_{380}	—	October 10, 2008	Kitt Peak	Spacewatch	·	1.4 km	MPC · JPL
692848	2015 BS_{380}	—	January 20, 2015	Haleakala	Pan-STARRS 1	BRG	980 m	MPC · JPL
692849	2015 BR_{391}	—	October 25, 2013	Mount Lemmon	Mount Lemmon Survey	·	1.4 km	MPC · JPL
692850	2015 BR_{395}	—	January 20, 2015	Haleakala	Pan-STARRS 1	·	780 m	MPC · JPL
692851	2015 BH_{397}	—	January 20, 2015	Haleakala	Pan-STARRS 1	EUN	900 m	MPC · JPL
692852	2015 BO_{400}	—	September 24, 2013	Mount Lemmon	Mount Lemmon Survey	·	1.5 km	MPC · JPL
692853	2015 BA_{402}	—	March 29, 2011	Mount Lemmon	Mount Lemmon Survey	·	990 m	MPC · JPL
692854	2015 BG_{403}	—	October 27, 2013	Haleakala	Pan-STARRS 1	·	1.2 km	MPC · JPL
692855	2015 BA_{404}	—	January 20, 2015	Haleakala	Pan-STARRS 1	·	910 m	MPC · JPL
692856	2015 BS_{404}	—	January 20, 2015	Haleakala	Pan-STARRS 1	·	1.2 km	MPC · JPL
692857	2015 BK_{415}	—	April 28, 2007	Kitt Peak	Spacewatch	·	1.0 km	MPC · JPL
692858	2015 BG_{416}	—	October 2, 2013	Mount Lemmon	Mount Lemmon Survey	·	1.3 km	MPC · JPL
692859	2015 BK_{417}	—	November 9, 2013	Catalina	CSS	·	1.4 km	MPC · JPL
692860	2015 BE_{419}	—	February 23, 2007	Mount Lemmon	Mount Lemmon Survey	3:2	3.9 km	MPC · JPL
692861	2015 BW_{424}	—	September 20, 2009	Mount Lemmon	Mount Lemmon Survey	·	1.0 km	MPC · JPL
692862	2015 BC_{428}	—	November 4, 2013	Mount Lemmon	Mount Lemmon Survey	·	1.2 km	MPC · JPL
692863	2015 BD_{430}	—	November 21, 2001	Apache Point	SDSS Collaboration	·	980 m	MPC · JPL
692864	2015 BE_{430}	—	January 20, 2015	Haleakala	Pan-STARRS 1	(5)	840 m	MPC · JPL
692865	2015 BE_{435}	—	January 20, 2015	Kitt Peak	Spacewatch	EUN	1.1 km	MPC · JPL
692866	2015 BX_{436}	—	March 9, 2011	Mount Lemmon	Mount Lemmon Survey	·	1.0 km	MPC · JPL
692867	2015 BH_{437}	—	January 20, 2015	Haleakala	Pan-STARRS 1	·	1.1 km	MPC · JPL
692868	2015 BH_{438}	—	October 30, 2007	Mount Lemmon	Mount Lemmon Survey	·	2.3 km	MPC · JPL
692869	2015 BX_{447}	—	June 14, 2012	Mount Lemmon	Mount Lemmon Survey	·	1.2 km	MPC · JPL
692870	2015 BG_{449}	—	January 20, 2015	Haleakala	Pan-STARRS 1	·	1.1 km	MPC · JPL
692871	2015 BV_{456}	—	January 20, 2015	Haleakala	Pan-STARRS 1	·	670 m	MPC · JPL
692872	2015 BT_{459}	—	December 28, 2002	Kitt Peak	Spacewatch	·	2.6 km	MPC · JPL
692873	2015 BZ_{459}	—	January 25, 2007	Kitt Peak	Spacewatch	·	1.1 km	MPC · JPL
692874	2015 BL_{462}	—	March 14, 2011	Mount Lemmon	Mount Lemmon Survey	·	1.1 km	MPC · JPL
692875	2015 BY_{463}	—	January 20, 2015	Haleakala	Pan-STARRS 1	·	870 m	MPC · JPL
692876	2015 BH_{465}	—	January 20, 2015	Haleakala	Pan-STARRS 1	·	1.1 km	MPC · JPL
692877	2015 BZ_{481}	—	August 16, 2009	Kitt Peak	Spacewatch	·	1.0 km	MPC · JPL
692878	2015 BM_{484}	—	August 17, 2012	Haleakala	Pan-STARRS 1	·	2.3 km	MPC · JPL
692879	2015 BJ_{487}	—	November 6, 2013	Haleakala	Pan-STARRS 1	·	2.9 km	MPC · JPL
692880	2015 BZ_{490}	—	August 16, 2012	ESA OGS	ESA OGS	·	1.3 km	MPC · JPL
692881	2015 BQ_{494}	—	October 1, 2013	Mount Lemmon	Mount Lemmon Survey	·	1.0 km	MPC · JPL
692882	2015 BF_{495}	—	February 7, 2011	Mount Lemmon	Mount Lemmon Survey	·	840 m	MPC · JPL
692883	2015 BQ_{498}	—	January 20, 2015	Haleakala	Pan-STARRS 1	·	950 m	MPC · JPL
692884	2015 BS_{500}	—	November 9, 2013	Mount Lemmon	Mount Lemmon Survey	·	940 m	MPC · JPL
692885	2015 BW_{511}	—	November 20, 2014	Mount Lemmon	Mount Lemmon Survey	VER	2.7 km	MPC · JPL
692886	2015 BM_{516}	—	January 16, 2015	Haleakala	Pan-STARRS 1	3:2	3.8 km	MPC · JPL
692887	2015 BP_{518}	—	February 10, 2014	Haleakala	Pan-STARRS 1	res · 4:7	229 km	MPC · JPL
692888	2015 BO_{529}	—	March 13, 2002	Kitt Peak	Spacewatch	·	1.5 km	MPC · JPL
692889	2015 BS_{529}	—	January 18, 2015	Haleakala	Pan-STARRS 1	EUN	840 m	MPC · JPL
692890	2015 BO_{531}	—	January 23, 2015	Haleakala	Pan-STARRS 1	·	1.4 km	MPC · JPL
692891	2015 BE_{533}	—	January 28, 2015	Haleakala	Pan-STARRS 1	·	1.8 km	MPC · JPL
692892	2015 BH_{533}	—	January 28, 2015	Haleakala	Pan-STARRS 1	·	1.4 km	MPC · JPL
692893	2015 BL_{535}	—	January 17, 2015	Haleakala	Pan-STARRS 1	·	1.1 km	MPC · JPL
692894	2015 BR_{536}	—	January 18, 2015	Haleakala	Pan-STARRS 1	·	1.2 km	MPC · JPL
692895	2015 BE_{537}	—	January 23, 2015	Haleakala	Pan-STARRS 1	·	1.3 km	MPC · JPL
692896	2015 BC_{538}	—	October 2, 2006	Mount Lemmon	Mount Lemmon Survey	V	520 m	MPC · JPL
692897	2015 BE_{539}	—	January 18, 2015	Kitt Peak	Spacewatch	·	1.3 km	MPC · JPL
692898	2015 BF_{539}	—	January 18, 2015	Haleakala	Pan-STARRS 1	·	1.3 km	MPC · JPL
692899	2015 BQ_{539}	—	January 20, 2015	Haleakala	Pan-STARRS 1	·	960 m	MPC · JPL
692900	2015 BX_{540}	—	March 25, 2007	Mount Lemmon	Mount Lemmon Survey	·	1.0 km	MPC · JPL

== 692901–693000 ==
back to top

Designation			Discovery			Properties		Ref
Permanent	Provisional	Named after	Date	Site	Discoverer(s)	Category	Diam.	Ref
692901	2015 BW_{543}	—	January 20, 2015	Haleakala	Pan-STARRS 1	·	1.3 km	MPC · JPL
692902	2015 BF_{544}	—	January 23, 2015	Haleakala	Pan-STARRS 1	·	1.5 km	MPC · JPL
692903	2015 BS_{544}	—	October 7, 2012	Haleakala	Pan-STARRS 1	·	1.6 km	MPC · JPL
692904	2015 BD_{545}	—	October 14, 2009	Mount Lemmon	Mount Lemmon Survey	·	1.0 km	MPC · JPL
692905	2015 BH_{545}	—	February 5, 2011	Mount Lemmon	Mount Lemmon Survey	·	1.1 km	MPC · JPL
692906	2015 BN_{546}	—	January 18, 2015	Haleakala	Pan-STARRS 1	·	1.1 km	MPC · JPL
692907	2015 BO_{546}	—	November 17, 2009	Mount Lemmon	Mount Lemmon Survey	·	1.2 km	MPC · JPL
692908	2015 BL_{547}	—	December 20, 2009	Mount Lemmon	Mount Lemmon Survey	·	1.5 km	MPC · JPL
692909	2015 BU_{547}	—	September 22, 2008	Kitt Peak	Spacewatch	·	1.8 km	MPC · JPL
692910	2015 BK_{549}	—	March 10, 2007	Mount Lemmon	Mount Lemmon Survey	·	990 m	MPC · JPL
692911	2015 BA_{550}	—	January 23, 2015	Haleakala	Pan-STARRS 1	·	1.0 km	MPC · JPL
692912	2015 BU_{550}	—	April 6, 2011	Mount Lemmon	Mount Lemmon Survey	JUN	650 m	MPC · JPL
692913	2015 BX_{550}	—	January 21, 2015	Haleakala	Pan-STARRS 1	·	1.0 km	MPC · JPL
692914	2015 BC_{551}	—	February 8, 2002	Kitt Peak	Spacewatch	·	1.3 km	MPC · JPL
692915	2015 BF_{553}	—	January 22, 1998	Kitt Peak	Spacewatch	·	610 m	MPC · JPL
692916	2015 BM_{558}	—	December 31, 2007	Kitt Peak	Spacewatch	V	540 m	MPC · JPL
692917	2015 BZ_{559}	—	April 11, 2008	Mount Lemmon	Mount Lemmon Survey	3:2	4.6 km	MPC · JPL
692918	2015 BF_{560}	—	March 16, 2007	Kitt Peak	Spacewatch	EUN	910 m	MPC · JPL
692919	2015 BM_{560}	—	January 18, 2015	Haleakala	Pan-STARRS 1	·	1.7 km	MPC · JPL
692920	2015 BC_{561}	—	December 15, 2014	Haleakala	Pan-STARRS 1	·	1.2 km	MPC · JPL
692921	2015 BZ_{561}	—	June 18, 2013	Haleakala	Pan-STARRS 1	·	1.1 km	MPC · JPL
692922	2015 BM_{564}	—	April 7, 2002	Cerro Tololo	Deep Ecliptic Survey	·	1.3 km	MPC · JPL
692923	2015 BP_{564}	—	March 11, 2005	Kitt Peak	Spacewatch	·	680 m	MPC · JPL
692924	2015 BB_{566}	—	November 6, 2010	Mount Lemmon	Mount Lemmon Survey	EUN	1.1 km	MPC · JPL
692925	2015 BD_{566}	—	June 14, 2012	Mount Lemmon	Mount Lemmon Survey	MAR	910 m	MPC · JPL
692926	2015 BB_{567}	—	January 27, 2011	Kitt Peak	Spacewatch	·	1.3 km	MPC · JPL
692927	2015 BF_{567}	—	September 15, 2004	Kitt Peak	Spacewatch	3:2 · (6124)	5.2 km	MPC · JPL
692928	2015 BQ_{570}	—	January 17, 2015	Mount Lemmon	Mount Lemmon Survey	·	1.3 km	MPC · JPL
692929	2015 BF_{573}	—	January 17, 2015	Haleakala	Pan-STARRS 1	H	530 m	MPC · JPL
692930	2015 BG_{573}	—	January 23, 2015	Haleakala	Pan-STARRS 1	H	420 m	MPC · JPL
692931	2015 BC_{574}	—	January 20, 2015	Haleakala	Pan-STARRS 1	HNS	800 m	MPC · JPL
692932	2015 BF_{574}	—	January 20, 2015	Haleakala	Pan-STARRS 1	HNS	730 m	MPC · JPL
692933	2015 BW_{577}	—	January 21, 2015	Mount Lemmon	Mount Lemmon Survey	·	1.3 km	MPC · JPL
692934	2015 BC_{579}	—	October 26, 2013	Mount Lemmon	Mount Lemmon Survey	·	1.1 km	MPC · JPL
692935	2015 BE_{579}	—	January 16, 2015	Haleakala	Pan-STARRS 1	·	1.1 km	MPC · JPL
692936	2015 BR_{579}	—	January 27, 2015	Haleakala	Pan-STARRS 1	EUN	980 m	MPC · JPL
692937	2015 BG_{587}	—	January 24, 2015	Haleakala	Pan-STARRS 1	·	2.7 km	MPC · JPL
692938	2015 BV_{589}	—	January 17, 2015	Haleakala	Pan-STARRS 1	MAR	730 m	MPC · JPL
692939	2015 BQ_{590}	—	January 26, 2015	Haleakala	Pan-STARRS 1	·	2.6 km	MPC · JPL
692940	2015 BD_{591}	—	January 22, 2015	Haleakala	Pan-STARRS 1	EUN	1.0 km	MPC · JPL
692941	2015 BU_{591}	—	January 17, 2015	Mount Lemmon	Mount Lemmon Survey	·	1.3 km	MPC · JPL
692942	2015 BO_{595}	—	January 25, 2015	Haleakala	Pan-STARRS 1	·	1.0 km	MPC · JPL
692943	2015 BE_{596}	—	January 23, 2015	Haleakala	Pan-STARRS 1	EUN	760 m	MPC · JPL
692944	2015 BY_{596}	—	January 28, 2015	Haleakala	Pan-STARRS 1	·	1.4 km	MPC · JPL
692945	2015 BS_{597}	—	January 20, 2015	Haleakala	Pan-STARRS 1	·	1.1 km	MPC · JPL
692946	2015 BX_{598}	—	January 23, 2015	Haleakala	Pan-STARRS 1	·	1.3 km	MPC · JPL
692947	2015 BY_{598}	—	January 21, 2015	Haleakala	Pan-STARRS 1	(5)	940 m	MPC · JPL
692948	2015 BQ_{602}	—	January 21, 2015	Haleakala	Pan-STARRS 1	526	1.5 km	MPC · JPL
692949	2015 BO_{603}	—	January 22, 2015	Haleakala	Pan-STARRS 1	·	1.0 km	MPC · JPL
692950	2015 BR_{603}	—	January 27, 2015	Haleakala	Pan-STARRS 1	·	1.2 km	MPC · JPL
692951	2015 BT_{604}	—	January 27, 2015	Haleakala	Pan-STARRS 1	MAR	720 m	MPC · JPL
692952	2015 BJ_{606}	—	January 18, 2015	Haleakala	Pan-STARRS 1	JUN	710 m	MPC · JPL
692953	2015 BR_{607}	—	January 20, 2015	Haleakala	Pan-STARRS 1	·	1.3 km	MPC · JPL
692954	2015 BL_{608}	—	January 19, 2015	Mount Lemmon	Mount Lemmon Survey	3:2	3.8 km	MPC · JPL
692955	2015 BE_{609}	—	January 26, 2015	Haleakala	Pan-STARRS 1	·	1.3 km	MPC · JPL
692956	2015 BA_{613}	—	January 22, 2015	Haleakala	Pan-STARRS 1	HNS	690 m	MPC · JPL
692957	2015 BD_{613}	—	January 22, 2015	Haleakala	Pan-STARRS 1	·	1.3 km	MPC · JPL
692958	2015 BH_{613}	—	January 17, 2015	Mount Lemmon	Mount Lemmon Survey	·	910 m	MPC · JPL
692959	2015 BK_{613}	—	January 18, 2015	Mount Lemmon	Mount Lemmon Survey	·	890 m	MPC · JPL
692960	2015 BX_{614}	—	January 19, 2015	Haleakala	Pan-STARRS 1	·	960 m	MPC · JPL
692961	2015 CQ_{3}	—	December 26, 2014	Haleakala	Pan-STARRS 1	RAF	880 m	MPC · JPL
692962	2015 CH_{12}	—	March 26, 2007	Mount Lemmon	Mount Lemmon Survey	MIS	2.0 km	MPC · JPL
692963	2015 CN_{15}	—	November 4, 2013	Haleakala	Pan-STARRS 1	VER	2.8 km	MPC · JPL
692964	2015 CQ_{15}	—	January 22, 2015	Haleakala	Pan-STARRS 1	·	1 km	MPC · JPL
692965	2015 CA_{22}	—	January 17, 2015	Haleakala	Pan-STARRS 1	ADE	1.3 km	MPC · JPL
692966	2015 CC_{23}	—	August 23, 2008	Siding Spring	SSS	BAR	1.1 km	MPC · JPL
692967	2015 CC_{24}	—	February 10, 2015	Kitt Peak	Spacewatch	·	960 m	MPC · JPL
692968	2015 CY_{25}	—	February 10, 2015	Mount Lemmon	Mount Lemmon Survey	·	1.3 km	MPC · JPL
692969	2015 CG_{28}	—	March 28, 2008	Mount Lemmon	Mount Lemmon Survey	3:2	4.4 km	MPC · JPL
692970	2015 CH_{28}	—	March 30, 2003	Kitt Peak	Deep Ecliptic Survey	·	900 m	MPC · JPL
692971	2015 CL_{35}	—	October 17, 1995	Kitt Peak	Spacewatch	·	1.2 km	MPC · JPL
692972	2015 CQ_{44}	—	January 23, 2006	Mount Lemmon	Mount Lemmon Survey	·	1.1 km	MPC · JPL
692973	2015 CX_{44}	—	February 15, 2015	Haleakala	Pan-STARRS 1	·	1.0 km	MPC · JPL
692974	2015 CV_{45}	—	February 15, 2015	Haleakala	Pan-STARRS 1	·	1.5 km	MPC · JPL
692975	2015 CT_{50}	—	December 1, 2005	Kitt Peak	Spacewatch	3:2 · SHU	4.2 km	MPC · JPL
692976	2015 CM_{52}	—	August 25, 2012	Kitt Peak	Spacewatch	·	1.7 km	MPC · JPL
692977	2015 CQ_{62}	—	October 14, 2012	Mount Lemmon	Mount Lemmon Survey	3:2 · SHU	3.9 km	MPC · JPL
692978	2015 CR_{62}	—	February 11, 2015	Mount Lemmon	Mount Lemmon Survey	3:2	4.2 km	MPC · JPL
692979	2015 CQ_{63}	—	January 2, 2011	Mount Lemmon	Mount Lemmon Survey	MAS	640 m	MPC · JPL
692980	2015 CD_{64}	—	November 11, 2001	Apache Point	SDSS Collaboration	·	1.0 km	MPC · JPL
692981	2015 CF_{67}	—	November 4, 2013	Mount Lemmon	Mount Lemmon Survey	·	1.3 km	MPC · JPL
692982	2015 CP_{67}	—	January 24, 2015	Haleakala	Pan-STARRS 1	·	3.3 km	MPC · JPL
692983	2015 CS_{69}	—	January 29, 2015	Haleakala	Pan-STARRS 1	·	1.1 km	MPC · JPL
692984	2015 CX_{69}	—	January 20, 2015	Haleakala	Pan-STARRS 1	MAR	670 m	MPC · JPL
692985	2015 CM_{70}	—	February 15, 2015	Haleakala	Pan-STARRS 1	·	1.1 km	MPC · JPL
692986	2015 CL_{73}	—	February 9, 2015	Mount Lemmon	Mount Lemmon Survey	·	1.4 km	MPC · JPL
692987	2015 CM_{73}	—	February 1, 2015	Haleakala	Pan-STARRS 1	·	1.2 km	MPC · JPL
692988	2015 CQ_{74}	—	February 15, 2015	Haleakala	Pan-STARRS 1	·	1.5 km	MPC · JPL
692989	2015 CB_{79}	—	January 22, 2015	Haleakala	Pan-STARRS 1	EUN	1.0 km	MPC · JPL
692990	2015 CA_{80}	—	February 14, 2015	Mount Lemmon	Mount Lemmon Survey	·	1.2 km	MPC · JPL
692991	2015 DV_{1}	—	January 20, 2015	Mount Lemmon	Mount Lemmon Survey	MAR	1.0 km	MPC · JPL
692992	2015 DK_{3}	—	January 14, 2015	Haleakala	Pan-STARRS 1	MAS	700 m	MPC · JPL
692993	2015 DZ_{9}	—	January 13, 2008	Kitt Peak	Spacewatch	·	750 m	MPC · JPL
692994	2015 DH_{14}	—	January 20, 2015	Haleakala	Pan-STARRS 1	·	1.0 km	MPC · JPL
692995	2015 DD_{18}	—	February 16, 2015	Haleakala	Pan-STARRS 1	·	1.1 km	MPC · JPL
692996	2015 DQ_{18}	—	January 27, 2015	Haleakala	Pan-STARRS 1	·	1.1 km	MPC · JPL
692997	2015 DM_{20}	—	April 2, 2011	Mount Lemmon	Mount Lemmon Survey	·	960 m	MPC · JPL
692998	2015 DF_{24}	—	January 30, 2006	Kitt Peak	Spacewatch	·	1.2 km	MPC · JPL
692999	2015 DL_{24}	—	November 1, 2008	Mount Lemmon	Mount Lemmon Survey	KOR	1.2 km	MPC · JPL
693000	2015 DL_{25}	—	January 19, 2015	Mount Lemmon	Mount Lemmon Survey	·	940 m	MPC · JPL

back to top
