= List of minor planets: 683001–684000 =

The following is a partial list of minor planets, running from minor-planet number 683001 through 684000, inclusive. The primary data for this and other partial lists is based on JPL's "Small-Body Orbital Elements" and data available from the Minor Planet Center. Critical list information is also provided by the MPC, unless otherwise specified from Lowell Observatory. A detailed description of the table's columns and additional sources are given on the main page including a complete list of every page in this series, and a statistical break-up on the dynamical classification of minor planets.

Also see the summary list of all named bodies in numerical and alphabetical order, and the corresponding naming citations for the number range of this particular list. New namings may only be added to this list after official publication, as the preannouncement of names is condemned by the Working Group for Small Bodies Nomenclature of the International Astronomical Union.

Near-Earth obj.	MBA (inner)	MBA (outer)	Centaur
Mars-crosser	MBA (middle)	Jupiter trojan	Trans-Neptunian obj.
Unclassified

== 683001–683100 ==
Designation			Discovery			Properties		Ref
Permanent	Provisional	Named after	Date	Site	Discoverer(s)	Category	Diam.	Ref
683001	2007 GQ_{10}	—	April 11, 2007	Kitt Peak	Spacewatch	·	2.6 km	MPC · JPL
683002	2007 GO_{15}	—	April 11, 2007	Mount Lemmon	Mount Lemmon Survey	·	2.6 km	MPC · JPL
683003	2007 GP_{15}	—	March 20, 2007	Mount Lemmon	Mount Lemmon Survey	·	470 m	MPC · JPL
683004	2007 GS_{31}	—	April 7, 2007	Mount Lemmon	Mount Lemmon Survey	·	2.3 km	MPC · JPL
683005	2007 GD_{33}	—	April 11, 2007	Kitt Peak	Spacewatch	·	550 m	MPC · JPL
683006	2007 GR_{35}	—	April 14, 2007	Kitt Peak	Spacewatch	·	780 m	MPC · JPL
683007	2007 GP_{44}	—	April 14, 2007	Kitt Peak	Spacewatch	·	1.2 km	MPC · JPL
683008	2007 GR_{49}	—	April 15, 2007	Kitt Peak	Spacewatch	·	2.7 km	MPC · JPL
683009	2007 GC_{57}	—	April 15, 2007	Kitt Peak	Spacewatch	·	580 m	MPC · JPL
683010	2007 GY_{57}	—	March 15, 2007	Mount Lemmon	Mount Lemmon Survey	EOS	1.8 km	MPC · JPL
683011	2007 GU_{62}	—	April 15, 2007	Kitt Peak	Spacewatch	·	2.4 km	MPC · JPL
683012	2007 GA_{68}	—	April 15, 2007	Kitt Peak	Spacewatch	·	670 m	MPC · JPL
683013	2007 GN_{76}	—	March 12, 2007	Kitt Peak	Spacewatch	·	2.2 km	MPC · JPL
683014	2007 GJ_{77}	—	March 15, 2007	Kitt Peak	Spacewatch	·	620 m	MPC · JPL
683015	2007 GY_{77}	—	April 14, 2007	Mount Lemmon	Mount Lemmon Survey	·	2.6 km	MPC · JPL
683016	2007 GO_{78}	—	April 13, 2013	Haleakala	Pan-STARRS 1	·	2.9 km	MPC · JPL
683017	2007 GC_{80}	—	October 8, 2015	Haleakala	Pan-STARRS 1	·	530 m	MPC · JPL
683018	2007 GY_{80}	—	September 29, 2009	Mount Lemmon	Mount Lemmon Survey	·	2.4 km	MPC · JPL
683019	2007 GZ_{80}	—	October 10, 2015	Haleakala	Pan-STARRS 1	·	2.7 km	MPC · JPL
683020	2007 GU_{81}	—	April 14, 2007	Mount Lemmon	Mount Lemmon Survey	·	2.9 km	MPC · JPL
683021	2007 HY_{2}	—	April 16, 2007	Mount Lemmon	Mount Lemmon Survey	·	1.9 km	MPC · JPL
683022	2007 HG_{10}	—	April 18, 2007	Mount Lemmon	Mount Lemmon Survey	·	1.5 km	MPC · JPL
683023	2007 HQ_{21}	—	April 18, 2007	Kitt Peak	Spacewatch	·	2.7 km	MPC · JPL
683024	2007 HG_{29}	—	April 19, 2007	Mount Lemmon	Mount Lemmon Survey	·	2.1 km	MPC · JPL
683025	2007 HD_{32}	—	November 18, 2001	Kitt Peak	Spacewatch	V	640 m	MPC · JPL
683026	2007 HM_{33}	—	April 19, 2007	Kitt Peak	Spacewatch	·	3.2 km	MPC · JPL
683027	2007 HH_{39}	—	April 20, 2007	Kitt Peak	Spacewatch	·	1.1 km	MPC · JPL
683028	2007 HE_{40}	—	April 20, 2007	Mount Lemmon	Mount Lemmon Survey	TIR	2.3 km	MPC · JPL
683029	2007 HJ_{41}	—	April 20, 2007	Kitt Peak	Spacewatch	·	460 m	MPC · JPL
683030	2007 HG_{42}	—	April 22, 2007	Mount Lemmon	Mount Lemmon Survey	·	1.1 km	MPC · JPL
683031	2007 HB_{46}	—	October 9, 2004	Kitt Peak	Spacewatch	·	2.7 km	MPC · JPL
683032	2007 HE_{47}	—	April 20, 2007	Mount Lemmon	Mount Lemmon Survey	·	1.3 km	MPC · JPL
683033	2007 HQ_{48}	—	November 17, 2001	Kitt Peak	Deep Lens Survey	ADE	1.8 km	MPC · JPL
683034	2007 HZ_{52}	—	April 20, 2007	Kitt Peak	Spacewatch	ADE	1.4 km	MPC · JPL
683035	2007 HO_{56}	—	April 22, 2007	Mount Lemmon	Mount Lemmon Survey	·	730 m	MPC · JPL
683036	2007 HD_{59}	—	April 7, 2007	Mount Lemmon	Mount Lemmon Survey	·	2.2 km	MPC · JPL
683037	2007 HG_{62}	—	March 17, 2007	Kitt Peak	Spacewatch	THM	2.1 km	MPC · JPL
683038	2007 HB_{64}	—	April 22, 2007	Mount Lemmon	Mount Lemmon Survey	·	1.0 km	MPC · JPL
683039	2007 HR_{64}	—	April 22, 2007	Mount Lemmon	Mount Lemmon Survey	·	2.4 km	MPC · JPL
683040	2007 HW_{65}	—	March 11, 2007	Mount Lemmon	Mount Lemmon Survey	·	1.3 km	MPC · JPL
683041	2007 HH_{70}	—	April 19, 2007	Kitt Peak	Spacewatch	·	2.8 km	MPC · JPL
683042	2007 HZ_{70}	—	April 20, 2007	Kitt Peak	Spacewatch	·	1.6 km	MPC · JPL
683043	2007 HB_{73}	—	April 22, 2007	Kitt Peak	Spacewatch	·	2.6 km	MPC · JPL
683044	2007 HH_{75}	—	January 7, 2006	Kitt Peak	Spacewatch	·	1.3 km	MPC · JPL
683045	2007 HJ_{79}	—	April 23, 2007	Mount Lemmon	Mount Lemmon Survey	EUN	930 m	MPC · JPL
683046	2007 HK_{79}	—	April 23, 2007	Mount Lemmon	Mount Lemmon Survey	·	1.2 km	MPC · JPL
683047	2007 HM_{80}	—	October 25, 2005	Kitt Peak	Spacewatch	·	1.1 km	MPC · JPL
683048	2007 HM_{82}	—	April 25, 2007	Mount Lemmon	Mount Lemmon Survey	·	1.2 km	MPC · JPL
683049	2007 HJ_{88}	—	June 6, 2018	Haleakala	Pan-STARRS 1	·	1.6 km	MPC · JPL
683050	2007 HK_{91}	—	April 18, 2007	Mount Lemmon	Mount Lemmon Survey	·	2.6 km	MPC · JPL
683051	2007 HP_{94}	—	April 23, 2007	Mount Graham	Grazian, A., Gredel, R.	KOR	1.1 km	MPC · JPL
683052	2007 HK_{96}	—	April 26, 2007	Kitt Peak	Spacewatch	·	1.0 km	MPC · JPL
683053	2007 HW_{98}	—	May 3, 2016	Mount Lemmon	Mount Lemmon Survey	·	1.2 km	MPC · JPL
683054	2007 HK_{100}	—	April 25, 2007	Mount Lemmon	Mount Lemmon Survey	·	650 m	MPC · JPL
683055	2007 HN_{100}	—	April 25, 2007	Mount Lemmon	Mount Lemmon Survey	·	1.3 km	MPC · JPL
683056	2007 HP_{100}	—	April 26, 2007	Mount Lemmon	Mount Lemmon Survey	3:2	5.6 km	MPC · JPL
683057	2007 HU_{100}	—	April 26, 2007	Kitt Peak	Spacewatch	·	600 m	MPC · JPL
683058	2007 HE_{101}	—	April 22, 2007	Mount Lemmon	Mount Lemmon Survey	·	1.6 km	MPC · JPL
683059	2007 HP_{101}	—	March 29, 2012	Haleakala	Pan-STARRS 1	EOS	1.7 km	MPC · JPL
683060	2007 HV_{101}	—	April 19, 2007	Kitt Peak	Spacewatch	·	1.4 km	MPC · JPL
683061	2007 HH_{102}	—	October 10, 2015	Haleakala	Pan-STARRS 1	VER	2.3 km	MPC · JPL
683062	2007 HL_{102}	—	October 12, 2013	Kitt Peak	Spacewatch	(5)	1.1 km	MPC · JPL
683063	2007 HR_{102}	—	April 24, 2007	Mount Lemmon	Mount Lemmon Survey	·	2.1 km	MPC · JPL
683064	2007 HA_{103}	—	September 2, 2011	Haleakala	Pan-STARRS 1	·	440 m	MPC · JPL
683065	2007 HQ_{103}	—	June 10, 2016	Haleakala	Pan-STARRS 1	·	1.3 km	MPC · JPL
683066	2007 HZ_{104}	—	December 7, 2015	Calar Alto-CASADO	Hellmich, S., Mottola, S.	·	2.4 km	MPC · JPL
683067	2007 HF_{105}	—	October 15, 2014	Kitt Peak	Spacewatch	·	1.3 km	MPC · JPL
683068	2007 HG_{105}	—	September 28, 2011	Kitt Peak	Spacewatch	3:2	4.2 km	MPC · JPL
683069	2007 HY_{105}	—	April 19, 2007	Mount Lemmon	Mount Lemmon Survey	·	1.1 km	MPC · JPL
683070	2007 HH_{106}	—	September 14, 2017	Haleakala	Pan-STARRS 1	·	1.3 km	MPC · JPL
683071	2007 HL_{106}	—	October 14, 2009	Mount Lemmon	Mount Lemmon Survey	·	1.2 km	MPC · JPL
683072	2007 HM_{106}	—	July 17, 2013	Haleakala	Pan-STARRS 1	·	1.7 km	MPC · JPL
683073	2007 HO_{107}	—	February 10, 2011	Mount Lemmon	Mount Lemmon Survey	·	1.5 km	MPC · JPL
683074	2007 HB_{108}	—	September 24, 2014	Mount Lemmon	Mount Lemmon Survey	EOS	1.3 km	MPC · JPL
683075	2007 HP_{108}	—	September 27, 2009	Mount Lemmon	Mount Lemmon Survey	·	3.0 km	MPC · JPL
683076	2007 HV_{108}	—	July 28, 2014	Haleakala	Pan-STARRS 1	VER	1.9 km	MPC · JPL
683077	2007 HW_{111}	—	April 25, 2007	Mount Lemmon	Mount Lemmon Survey	·	1.4 km	MPC · JPL
683078	2007 HX_{112}	—	April 20, 2007	Mount Lemmon	Mount Lemmon Survey	·	2.4 km	MPC · JPL
683079	2007 HA_{113}	—	April 25, 2007	Mount Lemmon	Mount Lemmon Survey	·	1.6 km	MPC · JPL
683080	2007 HH_{113}	—	April 25, 2007	Mount Lemmon	Mount Lemmon Survey	VER	1.9 km	MPC · JPL
683081	2007 HK_{115}	—	April 20, 2007	Mount Lemmon	Mount Lemmon Survey	·	2.6 km	MPC · JPL
683082	2007 HM_{115}	—	April 19, 2007	Mount Lemmon	Mount Lemmon Survey	·	1.1 km	MPC · JPL
683083	2007 HN_{117}	—	April 20, 2007	Kitt Peak	Spacewatch	·	2.2 km	MPC · JPL
683084	2007 JB_{6}	—	May 9, 2007	Mount Lemmon	Mount Lemmon Survey	·	1.5 km	MPC · JPL
683085	2007 JV_{8}	—	May 9, 2007	Mount Lemmon	Mount Lemmon Survey	·	550 m	MPC · JPL
683086	2007 JM_{9}	—	April 1, 2007	Palomar	NEAT	·	2.6 km	MPC · JPL
683087	2007 JP_{10}	—	April 20, 2007	Mount Lemmon	Mount Lemmon Survey	·	2.6 km	MPC · JPL
683088	2007 JE_{24}	—	May 9, 2007	Kitt Peak	Spacewatch	·	2.6 km	MPC · JPL
683089	2007 JO_{28}	—	May 10, 2007	Mount Lemmon	Mount Lemmon Survey	·	2.5 km	MPC · JPL
683090	2007 JW_{43}	—	May 15, 2007	Mount Lemmon	Mount Lemmon Survey	T_{j} (2.95)	3.2 km	MPC · JPL
683091	2007 JU_{46}	—	May 7, 2007	Mount Lemmon	Mount Lemmon Survey	·	800 m	MPC · JPL
683092	2007 JL_{47}	—	November 24, 2009	Mount Lemmon	Mount Lemmon Survey	HYG	2.4 km	MPC · JPL
683093	2007 JY_{47}	—	April 29, 2014	Haleakala	Pan-STARRS 1	PHO	850 m	MPC · JPL
683094	2007 JJ_{49}	—	September 25, 2009	Kitt Peak	Spacewatch	·	2.4 km	MPC · JPL
683095	2007 JX_{50}	—	February 15, 2015	Haleakala	Pan-STARRS 1	·	1.2 km	MPC · JPL
683096	2007 JQ_{51}	—	May 9, 2007	Kitt Peak	Spacewatch	·	1.4 km	MPC · JPL
683097	2007 JR_{51}	—	May 10, 2007	Mount Lemmon	Mount Lemmon Survey	·	1.3 km	MPC · JPL
683098	2007 JS_{51}	—	May 7, 2007	Kitt Peak	Spacewatch	·	1.2 km	MPC · JPL
683099	2007 JV_{51}	—	May 11, 2007	Mount Lemmon	Mount Lemmon Survey	·	1.2 km	MPC · JPL
683100	2007 JN_{52}	—	May 11, 2007	Mount Lemmon	Mount Lemmon Survey	·	1.4 km	MPC · JPL

== 683101–683200 ==
back to top

Designation			Discovery			Properties		Ref
Permanent	Provisional	Named after	Date	Site	Discoverer(s)	Category	Diam.	Ref
683101	2007 JP_{52}	—	May 7, 2007	Kitt Peak	Spacewatch	LUT	3.1 km	MPC · JPL
683102	2007 KX_{5}	—	May 24, 2007	Mount Lemmon	Mount Lemmon Survey	·	550 m	MPC · JPL
683103	2007 KH_{10}	—	December 23, 2016	Haleakala	Pan-STARRS 1	·	3.2 km	MPC · JPL
683104	2007 KN_{10}	—	September 29, 2017	Haleakala	Pan-STARRS 1	·	1.3 km	MPC · JPL
683105	2007 KR_{10}	—	February 23, 2017	Mount Lemmon	Mount Lemmon Survey	EOS	1.8 km	MPC · JPL
683106	2007 KF_{11}	—	February 27, 2012	Haleakala	Pan-STARRS 1	·	2.1 km	MPC · JPL
683107	2007 KH_{12}	—	May 26, 2007	Mount Lemmon	Mount Lemmon Survey	·	530 m	MPC · JPL
683108	2007 LL_{6}	—	June 8, 2007	Kitt Peak	Spacewatch	EUN	770 m	MPC · JPL
683109	2007 LL_{9}	—	May 11, 2007	Mount Lemmon	Mount Lemmon Survey	·	1.3 km	MPC · JPL
683110	2007 LO_{12}	—	June 9, 2007	Kitt Peak	Spacewatch	·	2.5 km	MPC · JPL
683111	2007 LU_{13}	—	March 23, 2003	Apache Point	SDSS	·	1.1 km	MPC · JPL
683112	2007 LC_{31}	—	March 2, 2006	Kitt Peak	Spacewatch	·	1.3 km	MPC · JPL
683113	2007 LU_{34}	—	June 9, 2007	Kitt Peak	Spacewatch	EUP	3.1 km	MPC · JPL
683114	2007 LQ_{38}	—	April 27, 2012	Haleakala	Pan-STARRS 1	EOS	1.7 km	MPC · JPL
683115	2007 LR_{38}	—	November 1, 2013	Kitt Peak	Spacewatch	HNS	910 m	MPC · JPL
683116	2007 MY_{4}	—	May 7, 2007	Mount Lemmon	Mount Lemmon Survey	T_{j} (2.98) · EUP	2.8 km	MPC · JPL
683117	2007 MD_{21}	—	June 21, 2007	Mount Lemmon	Mount Lemmon Survey	THM	2.0 km	MPC · JPL
683118	2007 MB_{25}	—	June 23, 2007	Kitt Peak	Spacewatch	·	1.2 km	MPC · JPL
683119	2007 MY_{27}	—	October 6, 2012	Haleakala	Pan-STARRS 1	WIT	890 m	MPC · JPL
683120	2007 MF_{28}	—	October 28, 2013	Mount Lemmon	Mount Lemmon Survey	·	2.2 km	MPC · JPL
683121	2007 MV_{28}	—	May 12, 2012	Mount Lemmon	Mount Lemmon Survey	·	2.8 km	MPC · JPL
683122	2007 MV_{29}	—	June 16, 2013	Mount Lemmon	Mount Lemmon Survey	THB	3.2 km	MPC · JPL
683123	2007 MC_{30}	—	June 16, 2007	Kitt Peak	Spacewatch	·	2.5 km	MPC · JPL
683124	2007 MQ_{30}	—	June 16, 2007	Kitt Peak	Spacewatch	·	1.1 km	MPC · JPL
683125	2007 ND_{7}	—	July 15, 2007	Siding Spring	K. Sárneczky, G. E. Sarty	·	2.3 km	MPC · JPL
683126	2007 OQ_{4}	—	July 18, 2007	Bergisch Gladbach	W. Bickel	·	2.2 km	MPC · JPL
683127	2007 ON_{11}	—	July 23, 2007	Charleston	R. Holmes	·	1.6 km	MPC · JPL
683128	2007 OR_{11}	—	July 28, 2007	Mauna Kea	P. A. Wiegert, N. I. Hasan	HNS	1.1 km	MPC · JPL
683129	2007 OZ_{11}	—	January 27, 2017	Haleakala	Pan-STARRS 1	·	580 m	MPC · JPL
683130	2007 OJ_{12}	—	July 18, 2007	Mount Lemmon	Mount Lemmon Survey	·	1.6 km	MPC · JPL
683131	2007 PL_{9}	—	August 12, 2007	Pla D'Arguines	R. Ferrando, Ferrando, M.	HYG	2.6 km	MPC · JPL
683132	2007 PO_{35}	—	August 9, 2007	Socorro	LINEAR	JUN	1.1 km	MPC · JPL
683133	2007 PC_{51}	—	August 11, 2007	Anderson Mesa	LONEOS	·	2.7 km	MPC · JPL
683134	2007 PQ_{51}	—	November 20, 2003	Palomar	NEAT	·	1.8 km	MPC · JPL
683135	2007 PG_{52}	—	March 7, 2016	Haleakala	Pan-STARRS 1	TIR	2.8 km	MPC · JPL
683136	2007 PX_{52}	—	August 10, 2007	Kitt Peak	Spacewatch	·	1.9 km	MPC · JPL
683137	2007 PA_{54}	—	August 9, 2007	Kitt Peak	Spacewatch	·	1.2 km	MPC · JPL
683138	2007 PF_{55}	—	August 10, 2007	Kitt Peak	Spacewatch	·	1.4 km	MPC · JPL
683139	2007 PJ_{55}	—	August 10, 2007	Kitt Peak	Spacewatch	·	1.4 km	MPC · JPL
683140	2007 QE_{1}	—	August 16, 2007	La Sagra	OAM	·	1.6 km	MPC · JPL
683141	2007 QZ_{3}	—	August 18, 2007	Bergisch Gladbach	W. Bickel	·	1.9 km	MPC · JPL
683142	2007 QR_{18}	—	May 24, 2006	Kitt Peak	Spacewatch	LIX	3.5 km	MPC · JPL
683143	2007 RH	—	September 1, 2007	Dauban	C. Rinner, Kugel, F.	·	2.6 km	MPC · JPL
683144	2007 RY_{4}	—	September 4, 2007	Wildberg	R. Apitzsch	·	930 m	MPC · JPL
683145	2007 RV_{14}	—	September 11, 2007	Dauban	Kugel, C. R. F.	·	3.3 km	MPC · JPL
683146	2007 RG_{16}	—	September 9, 2007	Kitt Peak	Spacewatch	·	3.1 km	MPC · JPL
683147	2007 RQ_{19}	—	September 12, 2007	Bergisch Gladbach	W. Bickel	EOS	2.0 km	MPC · JPL
683148	2007 RO_{25}	—	September 4, 2007	Mount Lemmon	Mount Lemmon Survey	CLA	1.3 km	MPC · JPL
683149	2007 RP_{26}	—	September 4, 2007	Mount Lemmon	Mount Lemmon Survey	·	1.4 km	MPC · JPL
683150	2007 RU_{26}	—	September 4, 2007	Mount Lemmon	Mount Lemmon Survey	·	520 m	MPC · JPL
683151	2007 RA_{27}	—	September 4, 2007	Mount Lemmon	Mount Lemmon Survey	·	1.3 km	MPC · JPL
683152	2007 RG_{27}	—	August 24, 2007	Kitt Peak	Spacewatch	·	1.4 km	MPC · JPL
683153	2007 RA_{29}	—	September 4, 2007	Mount Lemmon	Mount Lemmon Survey	·	1.3 km	MPC · JPL
683154	2007 RD_{30}	—	September 5, 2007	Mount Lemmon	Mount Lemmon Survey	·	1.8 km	MPC · JPL
683155	2007 RF_{45}	—	September 9, 2007	Kitt Peak	Spacewatch	·	1.6 km	MPC · JPL
683156	2007 RS_{46}	—	September 9, 2007	Kitt Peak	Spacewatch	HOF	2.0 km	MPC · JPL
683157	2007 RU_{49}	—	September 9, 2007	Mount Lemmon	Mount Lemmon Survey	·	590 m	MPC · JPL
683158	2007 RL_{54}	—	September 9, 2007	Kitt Peak	Spacewatch	·	3.1 km	MPC · JPL
683159	2007 RT_{54}	—	September 9, 2007	Kitt Peak	Spacewatch	·	1.5 km	MPC · JPL
683160	2007 RE_{61}	—	August 10, 2007	Kitt Peak	Spacewatch	·	1.4 km	MPC · JPL
683161	2007 RC_{64}	—	February 9, 2010	Mount Lemmon	Mount Lemmon Survey	·	2.3 km	MPC · JPL
683162	2007 RG_{64}	—	September 10, 2007	Mount Lemmon	Mount Lemmon Survey	·	1.8 km	MPC · JPL
683163	2007 RS_{64}	—	September 10, 2007	Mount Lemmon	Mount Lemmon Survey	·	1.3 km	MPC · JPL
683164	2007 RW_{66}	—	September 10, 2007	Mount Lemmon	Mount Lemmon Survey	HOF	2.0 km	MPC · JPL
683165	2007 RK_{68}	—	September 10, 2007	Kitt Peak	Spacewatch	·	2.8 km	MPC · JPL
683166	2007 RC_{69}	—	August 24, 2007	Kitt Peak	Spacewatch	·	1.1 km	MPC · JPL
683167	2007 RC_{72}	—	September 10, 2007	Kitt Peak	Spacewatch	·	950 m	MPC · JPL
683168	2007 RS_{74}	—	September 10, 2007	Mount Lemmon	Mount Lemmon Survey	HOF	1.9 km	MPC · JPL
683169	2007 RF_{75}	—	August 23, 2007	Kitt Peak	Spacewatch	·	3.6 km	MPC · JPL
683170	2007 RX_{75}	—	September 10, 2007	Mount Lemmon	Mount Lemmon Survey	·	2.8 km	MPC · JPL
683171	2007 RV_{78}	—	August 10, 2007	Kitt Peak	Spacewatch	·	2.7 km	MPC · JPL
683172	2007 RT_{81}	—	September 10, 2007	Mount Lemmon	Mount Lemmon Survey	HOF	2.0 km	MPC · JPL
683173	2007 RO_{82}	—	September 10, 2007	Mount Lemmon	Mount Lemmon Survey	WIT	740 m	MPC · JPL
683174	2007 RO_{84}	—	August 24, 2007	Kitt Peak	Spacewatch	HOF	2.0 km	MPC · JPL
683175	2007 RQ_{84}	—	September 10, 2007	Mount Lemmon	Mount Lemmon Survey	·	630 m	MPC · JPL
683176	2007 RE_{85}	—	September 10, 2007	Mount Lemmon	Mount Lemmon Survey	·	750 m	MPC · JPL
683177	2007 RT_{88}	—	September 10, 2007	Mount Lemmon	Mount Lemmon Survey	·	1.4 km	MPC · JPL
683178	2007 RS_{95}	—	September 10, 2007	Kitt Peak	Spacewatch	·	1.9 km	MPC · JPL
683179	2007 RA_{104}	—	September 11, 2007	Mount Lemmon	Mount Lemmon Survey	·	1.2 km	MPC · JPL
683180	2007 RA_{112}	—	September 15, 1998	Kitt Peak	Spacewatch	WIT	820 m	MPC · JPL
683181	2007 RL_{112}	—	October 14, 1998	Kitt Peak	Spacewatch	·	1.5 km	MPC · JPL
683182	2007 RS_{113}	—	September 11, 2007	Kitt Peak	Spacewatch	·	1.8 km	MPC · JPL
683183	2007 RJ_{115}	—	September 11, 2007	Kitt Peak	Spacewatch	HOF	1.9 km	MPC · JPL
683184	2007 RC_{116}	—	September 11, 2007	Kitt Peak	Spacewatch	HOF	2.0 km	MPC · JPL
683185	2007 RA_{120}	—	September 11, 2007	Lulin	LUSS	·	760 m	MPC · JPL
683186	2007 RR_{123}	—	September 12, 2007	Catalina	CSS	·	1.8 km	MPC · JPL
683187	2007 RZ_{123}	—	September 12, 2007	Catalina	CSS	LIX	2.8 km	MPC · JPL
683188	2007 RO_{129}	—	September 10, 2007	Kitt Peak	Spacewatch	·	700 m	MPC · JPL
683189	2007 RJ_{130}	—	September 12, 2007	Mount Lemmon	Mount Lemmon Survey	·	980 m	MPC · JPL
683190	2007 RG_{138}	—	September 14, 2007	Lulin	LUSS	MAS	580 m	MPC · JPL
683191	2007 RN_{150}	—	September 21, 2003	Kitt Peak	Spacewatch	·	1.2 km	MPC · JPL
683192	2007 RU_{151}	—	September 10, 2007	Kitt Peak	Spacewatch	·	1.6 km	MPC · JPL
683193	2007 RL_{152}	—	September 10, 2007	Kitt Peak	Spacewatch	HOF	1.8 km	MPC · JPL
683194	2007 RW_{159}	—	September 12, 2007	Catalina	CSS	·	660 m	MPC · JPL
683195	2007 RV_{161}	—	September 13, 2007	Mount Lemmon	Mount Lemmon Survey	MAS	570 m	MPC · JPL
683196	2007 RH_{163}	—	October 24, 2003	Kitt Peak	Spacewatch	·	1.4 km	MPC · JPL
683197	2007 RE_{165}	—	September 10, 2007	Kitt Peak	Spacewatch	·	770 m	MPC · JPL
683198	2007 RE_{166}	—	September 10, 2007	Kitt Peak	Spacewatch	L4	6.3 km	MPC · JPL
683199	2007 RQ_{166}	—	August 24, 2007	Kitt Peak	Spacewatch	·	1.5 km	MPC · JPL
683200	2007 RY_{168}	—	September 10, 2007	Kitt Peak	Spacewatch	·	1.5 km	MPC · JPL

== 683201–683300 ==
back to top

Designation			Discovery			Properties		Ref
Permanent	Provisional	Named after	Date	Site	Discoverer(s)	Category	Diam.	Ref
683201	2007 RB_{169}	—	September 10, 2007	Kitt Peak	Spacewatch	HOF	1.9 km	MPC · JPL
683202	2007 RN_{169}	—	September 10, 2007	Kitt Peak	Spacewatch	·	1.3 km	MPC · JPL
683203	2007 RF_{175}	—	February 4, 2000	Kitt Peak	Spacewatch	·	1.5 km	MPC · JPL
683204	2007 RU_{176}	—	September 10, 2007	Mount Lemmon	Mount Lemmon Survey	AGN	950 m	MPC · JPL
683205	2007 RK_{178}	—	September 10, 2007	Kitt Peak	Spacewatch	AGN	1 km	MPC · JPL
683206	2007 RU_{182}	—	September 12, 2007	Mount Lemmon	Mount Lemmon Survey	·	720 m	MPC · JPL
683207	2007 RO_{185}	—	October 20, 2003	Kitt Peak	Spacewatch	·	1.4 km	MPC · JPL
683208	2007 RD_{186}	—	September 13, 2007	Mount Lemmon	Mount Lemmon Survey	·	1.4 km	MPC · JPL
683209	2007 RX_{186}	—	September 13, 2007	Mount Lemmon	Mount Lemmon Survey	GEF	970 m	MPC · JPL
683210	2007 RB_{191}	—	September 11, 2007	Kitt Peak	Spacewatch	WIT	780 m	MPC · JPL
683211	2007 RV_{192}	—	February 27, 2000	Kitt Peak	Spacewatch	AGN	1.1 km	MPC · JPL
683212	2007 RB_{193}	—	September 12, 2007	Kitt Peak	Spacewatch	·	1.4 km	MPC · JPL
683213	2007 RB_{195}	—	September 12, 2007	Kitt Peak	Spacewatch	·	1.1 km	MPC · JPL
683214	2007 RJ_{195}	—	September 12, 2007	Kitt Peak	Spacewatch	·	530 m	MPC · JPL
683215	2007 RJ_{196}	—	March 11, 2005	Mount Lemmon	Mount Lemmon Survey	·	2.7 km	MPC · JPL
683216	2007 RS_{196}	—	September 13, 2007	Mount Lemmon	Mount Lemmon Survey	·	2.2 km	MPC · JPL
683217	2007 RY_{196}	—	September 13, 2007	Mount Lemmon	Mount Lemmon Survey	L4	6.9 km	MPC · JPL
683218	2007 RW_{202}	—	September 13, 2007	Kitt Peak	Spacewatch	·	1.0 km	MPC · JPL
683219	2007 RL_{205}	—	September 9, 2007	Kitt Peak	Spacewatch	·	2.8 km	MPC · JPL
683220	2007 RG_{208}	—	September 10, 2007	Kitt Peak	Spacewatch	·	1.3 km	MPC · JPL
683221	2007 RG_{214}	—	September 12, 2007	Kitt Peak	Spacewatch	AGN	940 m	MPC · JPL
683222	2007 RP_{218}	—	September 14, 2007	Mount Lemmon	Mount Lemmon Survey	·	1.3 km	MPC · JPL
683223	2007 RG_{221}	—	September 10, 2007	Kitt Peak	Spacewatch	·	580 m	MPC · JPL
683224	2007 RK_{227}	—	September 10, 2007	Kitt Peak	Spacewatch	·	570 m	MPC · JPL
683225	2007 RO_{235}	—	March 8, 2005	Mount Lemmon	Mount Lemmon Survey	·	2.9 km	MPC · JPL
683226	2007 RL_{248}	—	September 13, 2007	Mount Lemmon	Mount Lemmon Survey	·	2.9 km	MPC · JPL
683227	2007 RU_{249}	—	September 13, 2007	Kitt Peak	Spacewatch	·	2.9 km	MPC · JPL
683228	2007 RK_{251}	—	September 13, 2007	Kitt Peak	Spacewatch	HYG	2.5 km	MPC · JPL
683229	2007 RM_{254}	—	September 14, 2007	Kitt Peak	Spacewatch	AEO	940 m	MPC · JPL
683230	2007 RS_{254}	—	September 14, 2007	Kitt Peak	Spacewatch	WIT	730 m	MPC · JPL
683231	2007 RO_{255}	—	September 14, 2007	Kitt Peak	Spacewatch	·	1.4 km	MPC · JPL
683232	2007 RC_{275}	—	September 9, 2007	Mauna Kea	D. D. Balam, K. M. Perrett	·	1.3 km	MPC · JPL
683233	2007 RS_{278}	—	November 23, 2003	Kitt Peak	Spacewatch	JUN	900 m	MPC · JPL
683234	2007 RG_{281}	—	September 13, 2007	Catalina	CSS	·	2.1 km	MPC · JPL
683235	2007 RP_{301}	—	September 13, 2007	Mount Lemmon	Mount Lemmon Survey	·	1.4 km	MPC · JPL
683236	2007 RO_{305}	—	September 14, 2007	Mauna Kea	P. A. Wiegert	·	1.5 km	MPC · JPL
683237	2007 RO_{310}	—	September 5, 2007	Catalina	CSS	·	1.7 km	MPC · JPL
683238	2007 RB_{311}	—	September 6, 2007	Anderson Mesa	LONEOS	·	910 m	MPC · JPL
683239	2007 RO_{319}	—	September 12, 2007	Mount Lemmon	Mount Lemmon Survey	AEO	930 m	MPC · JPL
683240	2007 RA_{328}	—	September 15, 2007	Mount Lemmon	Mount Lemmon Survey	·	3.4 km	MPC · JPL
683241	2007 RM_{328}	—	September 13, 2007	Mount Lemmon	Mount Lemmon Survey	·	1.2 km	MPC · JPL
683242	2007 RD_{329}	—	September 15, 2007	Mount Lemmon	Mount Lemmon Survey	·	1.6 km	MPC · JPL
683243	2007 RO_{333}	—	October 5, 2013	Haleakala	Pan-STARRS 1	·	2.2 km	MPC · JPL
683244	2007 RY_{333}	—	October 29, 2008	Kitt Peak	Spacewatch	·	3.1 km	MPC · JPL
683245	2007 RH_{334}	—	March 8, 2005	Junk Bond	D. Healy	·	3.0 km	MPC · JPL
683246	2007 RP_{335}	—	October 17, 2012	Haleakala	Pan-STARRS 1	·	1.4 km	MPC · JPL
683247	2007 RW_{335}	—	September 12, 2007	Kitt Peak	Spacewatch	·	1.2 km	MPC · JPL
683248	2007 RY_{335}	—	August 27, 2014	Haleakala	Pan-STARRS 1	(260)	2.9 km	MPC · JPL
683249	2007 RE_{336}	—	January 9, 2013	Kitt Peak	Spacewatch	·	950 m	MPC · JPL
683250	2007 RV_{337}	—	September 12, 2007	Kitt Peak	Spacewatch	·	670 m	MPC · JPL
683251	2007 RP_{338}	—	October 4, 2013	Mount Lemmon	Mount Lemmon Survey	THB	3.2 km	MPC · JPL
683252	2007 RR_{338}	—	August 24, 2007	Kitt Peak	Spacewatch	·	2.7 km	MPC · JPL
683253	2007 RT_{339}	—	October 6, 2012	Mount Lemmon	Mount Lemmon Survey	·	1.6 km	MPC · JPL
683254	2007 RE_{340}	—	September 13, 2007	Kitt Peak	Spacewatch	·	1.5 km	MPC · JPL
683255	2007 RM_{343}	—	September 5, 2007	Mount Lemmon	Mount Lemmon Survey	AGN	900 m	MPC · JPL
683256	2007 RS_{344}	—	September 14, 2007	Mount Lemmon	Mount Lemmon Survey	H	320 m	MPC · JPL
683257	2007 RU_{344}	—	July 30, 2014	Kitt Peak	Spacewatch	·	620 m	MPC · JPL
683258	2007 RO_{347}	—	February 3, 2009	Mount Lemmon	Mount Lemmon Survey	BRA	1.1 km	MPC · JPL
683259	2007 RL_{349}	—	August 8, 2016	Haleakala	Pan-STARRS 1	·	1.3 km	MPC · JPL
683260	2007 RU_{349}	—	September 5, 2007	Siding Spring	K. Sárneczky, L. Kiss	·	860 m	MPC · JPL
683261	2007 RD_{350}	—	April 18, 2015	Haleakala	Pan-STARRS 1	·	1.4 km	MPC · JPL
683262	2007 RK_{351}	—	January 19, 2013	Kitt Peak	Spacewatch	L4	7.4 km	MPC · JPL
683263	2007 RY_{351}	—	October 10, 2012	Kitt Peak	Spacewatch	·	1.3 km	MPC · JPL
683264	2007 RR_{353}	—	September 10, 2007	Mount Lemmon	Mount Lemmon Survey	·	2.4 km	MPC · JPL
683265	2007 RT_{353}	—	September 4, 2007	Mount Lemmon	Mount Lemmon Survey	·	560 m	MPC · JPL
683266	2007 RY_{354}	—	September 13, 2007	Kitt Peak	Spacewatch	·	880 m	MPC · JPL
683267	2007 RK_{355}	—	September 9, 2007	Kitt Peak	Spacewatch	·	1.8 km	MPC · JPL
683268	2007 RY_{355}	—	September 10, 2007	Mount Lemmon	Mount Lemmon Survey	·	1.3 km	MPC · JPL
683269	2007 RV_{357}	—	September 9, 2007	Kitt Peak	Spacewatch	·	590 m	MPC · JPL
683270	2007 RA_{358}	—	September 5, 2007	Mount Lemmon	Mount Lemmon Survey	·	1.5 km	MPC · JPL
683271	2007 RX_{358}	—	September 11, 2007	Mount Lemmon	Mount Lemmon Survey	·	1.7 km	MPC · JPL
683272	2007 RB_{360}	—	November 30, 2003	Kitt Peak	Spacewatch	·	1 km	MPC · JPL
683273	2007 RJ_{361}	—	September 14, 2007	Mount Lemmon	Mount Lemmon Survey	·	1.4 km	MPC · JPL
683274	2007 RK_{361}	—	September 12, 2007	Mount Lemmon	Mount Lemmon Survey	·	1.7 km	MPC · JPL
683275	2007 RP_{361}	—	September 9, 2007	Kitt Peak	Spacewatch	·	600 m	MPC · JPL
683276	2007 RK_{364}	—	September 14, 2007	Mount Lemmon	Mount Lemmon Survey	·	1.2 km	MPC · JPL
683277	2007 RV_{365}	—	September 13, 2007	Kitt Peak	Spacewatch	·	1.5 km	MPC · JPL
683278	2007 RC_{366}	—	September 15, 2007	Kitt Peak	Spacewatch	·	1.1 km	MPC · JPL
683279	2007 RN_{367}	—	September 13, 2007	Mount Lemmon	Mount Lemmon Survey	·	2.5 km	MPC · JPL
683280	2007 RW_{367}	—	September 13, 2007	Mount Lemmon	Mount Lemmon Survey	NYS	1.0 km	MPC · JPL
683281	2007 RO_{368}	—	September 13, 2007	Mount Lemmon	Mount Lemmon Survey	HOF	2.2 km	MPC · JPL
683282	2007 RA_{370}	—	September 15, 2007	Kitt Peak	Spacewatch	·	1.7 km	MPC · JPL
683283	2007 RZ_{371}	—	September 11, 2007	Mount Lemmon	Mount Lemmon Survey	AGN	900 m	MPC · JPL
683284	2007 RE_{373}	—	September 9, 2007	Kitt Peak	Spacewatch	AGN	1.0 km	MPC · JPL
683285	2007 RT_{373}	—	September 13, 2007	Mount Lemmon	Mount Lemmon Survey	·	1.4 km	MPC · JPL
683286	2007 RZ_{373}	—	September 13, 2007	Mount Lemmon	Mount Lemmon Survey	·	1.5 km	MPC · JPL
683287	2007 RL_{374}	—	September 11, 2007	Mount Lemmon	Mount Lemmon Survey	AST	1.4 km	MPC · JPL
683288	2007 RB_{375}	—	September 14, 2007	Mount Lemmon	Mount Lemmon Survey	AGN	900 m	MPC · JPL
683289	2007 RH_{375}	—	September 11, 2007	Mount Lemmon	Mount Lemmon Survey	AGN	880 m	MPC · JPL
683290	2007 RJ_{375}	—	September 12, 2007	Mount Lemmon	Mount Lemmon Survey	·	1.5 km	MPC · JPL
683291	2007 RO_{375}	—	September 13, 2007	Mount Lemmon	Mount Lemmon Survey	WIT	710 m	MPC · JPL
683292	2007 RX_{375}	—	September 13, 2007	Mount Lemmon	Mount Lemmon Survey	HOF	2.1 km	MPC · JPL
683293	2007 RO_{376}	—	September 12, 2007	Mount Lemmon	Mount Lemmon Survey	HOF	1.8 km	MPC · JPL
683294	2007 RY_{376}	—	September 11, 2007	Mount Lemmon	Mount Lemmon Survey	·	1.4 km	MPC · JPL
683295	2007 RA_{378}	—	September 13, 2007	Mount Lemmon	Mount Lemmon Survey	·	1.3 km	MPC · JPL
683296	2007 RC_{381}	—	March 10, 2005	Mount Lemmon	Mount Lemmon Survey	·	910 m	MPC · JPL
683297	2007 SH_{2}	—	August 23, 2007	Kitt Peak	Spacewatch	·	2.9 km	MPC · JPL
683298	2007 SS_{4}	—	September 21, 2007	Altschwendt	W. Ries	AGN	1.2 km	MPC · JPL
683299	2007 SA_{8}	—	September 18, 2007	Kitt Peak	Spacewatch	·	510 m	MPC · JPL
683300	2007 SL_{13}	—	September 19, 2007	Kitt Peak	Spacewatch	·	1.7 km	MPC · JPL

== 683301–683400 ==
back to top

Designation			Discovery			Properties		Ref
Permanent	Provisional	Named after	Date	Site	Discoverer(s)	Category	Diam.	Ref
683301	2007 SZ_{25}	—	September 19, 2007	Kitt Peak	Spacewatch	·	1.2 km	MPC · JPL
683302	2007 SH_{26}	—	February 28, 2014	Haleakala	Pan-STARRS 1	·	1.5 km	MPC · JPL
683303	2007 SM_{26}	—	October 8, 2012	Kitt Peak	Spacewatch	·	1.6 km	MPC · JPL
683304	2007 SD_{28}	—	September 22, 2007	Altschwendt	W. Ries	AGN	1 km	MPC · JPL
683305	2007 SE_{28}	—	September 19, 2007	Kitt Peak	Spacewatch	·	870 m	MPC · JPL
683306	2007 SQ_{29}	—	September 24, 2007	Kitt Peak	Spacewatch	AGN	970 m	MPC · JPL
683307	2007 TX_{14}	—	October 8, 2007	7300	W. K. Y. Yeung	H	400 m	MPC · JPL
683308	2007 TN_{15}	—	October 2, 2007	Charleston	R. Holmes	·	1.1 km	MPC · JPL
683309	2007 TE_{30}	—	October 4, 2007	Kitt Peak	Spacewatch	NYS	890 m	MPC · JPL
683310	2007 TT_{31}	—	October 5, 2007	Siding Spring	SSS	JUN	830 m	MPC · JPL
683311	2007 TB_{46}	—	October 7, 2007	Catalina	CSS	H	370 m	MPC · JPL
683312	2007 TA_{80}	—	July 20, 2001	Palomar	NEAT	·	3.4 km	MPC · JPL
683313	2007 TB_{82}	—	September 4, 2007	Mount Lemmon	Mount Lemmon Survey	EUN	980 m	MPC · JPL
683314	2007 TS_{82}	—	September 11, 2007	Mount Lemmon	Mount Lemmon Survey	AGN	1.0 km	MPC · JPL
683315	2007 TK_{88}	—	October 8, 2007	Mount Lemmon	Mount Lemmon Survey	·	900 m	MPC · JPL
683316	2007 TH_{99}	—	October 8, 2007	Mount Lemmon	Mount Lemmon Survey	NYS	710 m	MPC · JPL
683317	2007 TN_{100}	—	October 8, 2007	Mount Lemmon	Mount Lemmon Survey	AGN	1.0 km	MPC · JPL
683318	2007 TC_{116}	—	April 6, 2005	Mount Lemmon	Mount Lemmon Survey	·	1.5 km	MPC · JPL
683319	2007 TC_{124}	—	October 6, 2007	Kitt Peak	Spacewatch	SYL	3.5 km	MPC · JPL
683320	2007 TL_{135}	—	October 8, 2007	Kitt Peak	Spacewatch	·	1.7 km	MPC · JPL
683321	2007 TN_{139}	—	September 15, 2007	Mount Lemmon	Mount Lemmon Survey	·	1.6 km	MPC · JPL
683322	2007 TR_{193}	—	September 11, 2007	Mount Lemmon	Mount Lemmon Survey	HOF	1.9 km	MPC · JPL
683323	2007 TS_{196}	—	October 8, 2007	Kitt Peak	Spacewatch	HOF	2.0 km	MPC · JPL
683324	2007 TG_{208}	—	October 10, 2007	Mount Lemmon	Mount Lemmon Survey	HOF	1.9 km	MPC · JPL
683325	2007 TB_{210}	—	September 10, 2007	Mount Lemmon	Mount Lemmon Survey	·	1.5 km	MPC · JPL
683326	2007 TE_{210}	—	August 10, 2007	Kitt Peak	Spacewatch	·	2.7 km	MPC · JPL
683327	2007 TD_{221}	—	September 10, 2007	Mount Lemmon	Mount Lemmon Survey	·	1.4 km	MPC · JPL
683328	2007 TZ_{222}	—	October 10, 2007	Kitt Peak	Spacewatch	·	3.0 km	MPC · JPL
683329	2007 TY_{230}	—	October 8, 2007	Kitt Peak	Spacewatch	·	1.7 km	MPC · JPL
683330	2007 TA_{241}	—	November 4, 2002	Palomar	NEAT	·	3.3 km	MPC · JPL
683331	2007 TM_{247}	—	October 10, 2007	Kitt Peak	Spacewatch	·	1.8 km	MPC · JPL
683332	2007 TX_{249}	—	October 11, 2007	Mount Lemmon	Mount Lemmon Survey	AGN	920 m	MPC · JPL
683333	2007 TQ_{251}	—	October 11, 2007	Mount Lemmon	Mount Lemmon Survey	·	780 m	MPC · JPL
683334	2007 TD_{254}	—	June 7, 2006	Siding Spring	SSS	·	980 m	MPC · JPL
683335	2007 TE_{255}	—	September 12, 2007	Kitt Peak	Spacewatch	·	1.5 km	MPC · JPL
683336	2007 TY_{256}	—	October 10, 2007	Kitt Peak	Spacewatch	·	2.8 km	MPC · JPL
683337	2007 TQ_{262}	—	October 10, 2007	Kitt Peak	Spacewatch	AGN	960 m	MPC · JPL
683338	2007 TJ_{268}	—	October 9, 2007	Kitt Peak	Spacewatch	·	1.5 km	MPC · JPL
683339	2007 TW_{273}	—	December 13, 1996	Kitt Peak	Spacewatch	·	980 m	MPC · JPL
683340	2007 TZ_{273}	—	October 10, 2007	Mount Lemmon	Mount Lemmon Survey	·	760 m	MPC · JPL
683341	2007 TX_{279}	—	October 13, 2007	Kitt Peak	Spacewatch	·	1.5 km	MPC · JPL
683342	2007 TP_{284}	—	October 9, 2007	Mount Lemmon	Mount Lemmon Survey	AST	1.3 km	MPC · JPL
683343	2007 TZ_{288}	—	October 11, 2007	Catalina	CSS	·	1.1 km	MPC · JPL
683344	2007 TU_{290}	—	October 12, 2007	Mount Lemmon	Mount Lemmon Survey	·	1.8 km	MPC · JPL
683345	2007 TD_{295}	—	September 14, 2007	Mount Lemmon	Mount Lemmon Survey	·	1.4 km	MPC · JPL
683346	2007 TV_{297}	—	September 14, 2007	Mount Lemmon	Mount Lemmon Survey	·	1.7 km	MPC · JPL
683347	2007 TC_{304}	—	October 12, 2007	Mount Lemmon	Mount Lemmon Survey	·	1.2 km	MPC · JPL
683348	2007 TX_{307}	—	September 12, 2007	Mount Lemmon	Mount Lemmon Survey	·	730 m	MPC · JPL
683349	2007 TL_{311}	—	October 11, 2007	Mount Lemmon	Mount Lemmon Survey	·	1.6 km	MPC · JPL
683350	2007 TK_{313}	—	October 11, 2007	Mount Lemmon	Mount Lemmon Survey	·	810 m	MPC · JPL
683351	2007 TE_{314}	—	October 11, 2007	Mount Lemmon	Mount Lemmon Survey	·	1.5 km	MPC · JPL
683352	2007 TU_{317}	—	October 12, 2007	Kitt Peak	Spacewatch	BRA	1.2 km	MPC · JPL
683353	2007 TA_{326}	—	October 11, 2007	Kitt Peak	Spacewatch	·	1.4 km	MPC · JPL
683354	2007 TN_{326}	—	October 11, 2007	Kitt Peak	Spacewatch	·	930 m	MPC · JPL
683355	2007 TD_{327}	—	October 11, 2007	Kitt Peak	Spacewatch	·	1.3 km	MPC · JPL
683356	2007 TM_{327}	—	October 11, 2007	Kitt Peak	Spacewatch	·	2.0 km	MPC · JPL
683357	2007 TR_{327}	—	October 11, 2007	Kitt Peak	Spacewatch	·	1.4 km	MPC · JPL
683358	2007 TH_{329}	—	September 9, 2007	Mount Lemmon	Mount Lemmon Survey	·	1.9 km	MPC · JPL
683359	2007 TN_{329}	—	October 11, 2007	Kitt Peak	Spacewatch	CLA	1.1 km	MPC · JPL
683360	2007 TY_{340}	—	October 9, 2007	Mount Lemmon	Mount Lemmon Survey	·	2.4 km	MPC · JPL
683361	2007 TR_{342}	—	October 10, 2007	Mount Lemmon	Mount Lemmon Survey	HOF	2.1 km	MPC · JPL
683362	2007 TK_{343}	—	October 10, 2007	Mount Lemmon	Mount Lemmon Survey	HOF	2.1 km	MPC · JPL
683363	2007 TS_{343}	—	October 10, 2007	Mount Lemmon	Mount Lemmon Survey	HOF	2.1 km	MPC · JPL
683364	2007 TB_{349}	—	October 15, 2007	Mount Lemmon	Mount Lemmon Survey	·	3.0 km	MPC · JPL
683365	2007 TL_{359}	—	September 15, 2007	Kitt Peak	Spacewatch	HYG	2.6 km	MPC · JPL
683366	2007 TX_{368}	—	October 11, 2007	Mount Lemmon	Mount Lemmon Survey	·	1.5 km	MPC · JPL
683367	2007 TL_{374}	—	September 19, 2007	Kitt Peak	Spacewatch	·	770 m	MPC · JPL
683368	2007 TD_{380}	—	October 14, 2007	Kitt Peak	Spacewatch	·	1.4 km	MPC · JPL
683369	2007 TJ_{385}	—	October 15, 2007	Catalina	CSS	·	3.0 km	MPC · JPL
683370	2007 TC_{387}	—	September 14, 2007	Mount Lemmon	Mount Lemmon Survey	·	1.3 km	MPC · JPL
683371	2007 TU_{387}	—	October 13, 2007	Kitt Peak	Spacewatch	·	1.6 km	MPC · JPL
683372	2007 TY_{388}	—	September 12, 2007	Mount Lemmon	Mount Lemmon Survey	·	1.5 km	MPC · JPL
683373	2007 TL_{393}	—	October 13, 2007	Mount Lemmon	Mount Lemmon Survey	·	2.9 km	MPC · JPL
683374	2007 TO_{396}	—	October 15, 2007	Kitt Peak	Spacewatch	·	1.7 km	MPC · JPL
683375	2007 TY_{398}	—	October 11, 2007	Kitt Peak	Spacewatch	·	1.6 km	MPC · JPL
683376	2007 TN_{403}	—	November 19, 1998	Caussols	ODAS	·	1.9 km	MPC · JPL
683377	2007 TU_{403}	—	October 15, 2007	Kitt Peak	Spacewatch	·	1.1 km	MPC · JPL
683378	2007 TK_{406}	—	October 15, 2007	Mount Lemmon	Mount Lemmon Survey	·	1.6 km	MPC · JPL
683379	2007 TE_{409}	—	October 15, 2007	Mount Lemmon	Mount Lemmon Survey	WIT	840 m	MPC · JPL
683380	2007 TF_{409}	—	October 15, 2007	Mount Lemmon	Mount Lemmon Survey	·	1.7 km	MPC · JPL
683381	2007 TZ_{423}	—	October 7, 2007	Mount Lemmon	Mount Lemmon Survey	·	1.4 km	MPC · JPL
683382	2007 TL_{433}	—	November 20, 2003	Kitt Peak	Spacewatch	EUN	1.1 km	MPC · JPL
683383	2007 TR_{434}	—	October 11, 2007	Catalina	CSS	·	1.7 km	MPC · JPL
683384	2007 TM_{435}	—	October 12, 2007	Mount Lemmon	Mount Lemmon Survey	AEO	950 m	MPC · JPL
683385	2007 TC_{438}	—	October 12, 2007	Kitt Peak	Spacewatch	·	1.3 km	MPC · JPL
683386	2007 TA_{440}	—	October 7, 2007	Mount Lemmon	Mount Lemmon Survey	·	1.4 km	MPC · JPL
683387	2007 TL_{454}	—	October 3, 2013	Haleakala	Pan-STARRS 1	·	2.4 km	MPC · JPL
683388	2007 TQ_{455}	—	October 9, 2007	Mount Lemmon	Mount Lemmon Survey	·	1.5 km	MPC · JPL
683389	2007 TB_{456}	—	March 4, 2005	Mount Lemmon	Mount Lemmon Survey	MAS	550 m	MPC · JPL
683390	2007 TZ_{457}	—	October 10, 2007	Mount Lemmon	Mount Lemmon Survey	·	900 m	MPC · JPL
683391	2007 TA_{459}	—	May 19, 2006	Mount Lemmon	Mount Lemmon Survey	·	1.5 km	MPC · JPL
683392	2007 TE_{460}	—	October 10, 2007	Kitt Peak	Spacewatch	VER	2.5 km	MPC · JPL
683393	2007 TO_{461}	—	January 1, 2009	Kitt Peak	Spacewatch	BRA	1.6 km	MPC · JPL
683394	2007 TU_{463}	—	October 21, 2016	Mount Lemmon	Mount Lemmon Survey	·	1.7 km	MPC · JPL
683395	2007 TG_{465}	—	August 20, 2014	Haleakala	Pan-STARRS 1	·	770 m	MPC · JPL
683396	2007 TY_{465}	—	October 12, 2007	Mount Lemmon	Mount Lemmon Survey	·	1.7 km	MPC · JPL
683397	2007 TL_{466}	—	October 9, 2007	Kitt Peak	Spacewatch	·	2.9 km	MPC · JPL
683398	2007 TP_{467}	—	October 7, 2007	Mount Lemmon	Mount Lemmon Survey	·	490 m	MPC · JPL
683399	2007 TQ_{467}	—	September 9, 2007	Kitt Peak	Spacewatch	·	2.8 km	MPC · JPL
683400	2007 TV_{467}	—	April 10, 2010	Mount Lemmon	Mount Lemmon Survey	·	860 m	MPC · JPL

== 683401–683500 ==
back to top

Designation			Discovery			Properties		Ref
Permanent	Provisional	Named after	Date	Site	Discoverer(s)	Category	Diam.	Ref
683401	2007 TB_{468}	—	January 19, 2013	Mount Lemmon	Mount Lemmon Survey	(5)	1.1 km	MPC · JPL
683402	2007 TJ_{468}	—	September 18, 2014	Haleakala	Pan-STARRS 1	·	1.1 km	MPC · JPL
683403	2007 TL_{471}	—	May 26, 2015	Haleakala	Pan-STARRS 1	BRA	1.1 km	MPC · JPL
683404	2007 TQ_{472}	—	September 19, 2012	Mount Lemmon	Mount Lemmon Survey	·	1.4 km	MPC · JPL
683405	2007 TU_{473}	—	October 10, 2007	Kitt Peak	Spacewatch	·	850 m	MPC · JPL
683406	2007 TC_{474}	—	February 27, 2009	Mount Lemmon	Mount Lemmon Survey	·	1.1 km	MPC · JPL
683407	2007 TQ_{474}	—	October 12, 2007	Mount Lemmon	Mount Lemmon Survey	HOF	2.0 km	MPC · JPL
683408	2007 TV_{479}	—	October 7, 2007	Kitt Peak	Spacewatch	·	1.5 km	MPC · JPL
683409	2007 TV_{480}	—	October 11, 2007	Kitt Peak	Spacewatch	·	1.2 km	MPC · JPL
683410	2007 TB_{481}	—	October 9, 2007	Kitt Peak	Spacewatch	·	1.8 km	MPC · JPL
683411	2007 TC_{483}	—	October 8, 2007	Mount Lemmon	Mount Lemmon Survey	·	540 m	MPC · JPL
683412	2007 TV_{483}	—	October 9, 2007	Kitt Peak	Spacewatch	ULA	3.5 km	MPC · JPL
683413	2007 TH_{484}	—	October 14, 2007	Mount Lemmon	Mount Lemmon Survey	·	1.5 km	MPC · JPL
683414	2007 TJ_{484}	—	October 10, 2007	Kitt Peak	Spacewatch	·	1.4 km	MPC · JPL
683415	2007 TT_{484}	—	October 12, 2007	Kitt Peak	Spacewatch	·	1.5 km	MPC · JPL
683416	2007 TR_{485}	—	October 8, 2007	Mount Lemmon	Mount Lemmon Survey	·	1.1 km	MPC · JPL
683417	2007 TT_{487}	—	October 11, 2007	Kitt Peak	Spacewatch	·	1.4 km	MPC · JPL
683418	2007 TK_{493}	—	October 13, 2007	Mount Lemmon	Mount Lemmon Survey	·	1.7 km	MPC · JPL
683419	2007 TX_{494}	—	October 10, 2007	Kitt Peak	Spacewatch	·	690 m	MPC · JPL
683420	2007 TK_{495}	—	October 10, 2007	Kitt Peak	Spacewatch	·	960 m	MPC · JPL
683421	2007 TX_{496}	—	October 12, 2007	Mount Lemmon	Mount Lemmon Survey	·	1.0 km	MPC · JPL
683422	2007 TA_{498}	—	October 15, 2007	Mount Lemmon	Mount Lemmon Survey	H	420 m	MPC · JPL
683423	2007 TL_{499}	—	October 15, 2007	Mount Lemmon	Mount Lemmon Survey	·	1.7 km	MPC · JPL
683424	2007 TA_{501}	—	October 10, 2007	Mount Lemmon	Mount Lemmon Survey	·	1.4 km	MPC · JPL
683425	2007 TG_{501}	—	October 12, 2007	Kitt Peak	Spacewatch	HOF	2.0 km	MPC · JPL
683426	2007 TJ_{501}	—	October 8, 2007	Mount Lemmon	Mount Lemmon Survey	HOF	1.7 km	MPC · JPL
683427	2007 TK_{501}	—	October 11, 2007	Kitt Peak	Spacewatch	·	1.6 km	MPC · JPL
683428	2007 TR_{501}	—	October 8, 2007	Mount Lemmon	Mount Lemmon Survey	AGN	970 m	MPC · JPL
683429	2007 TT_{501}	—	October 15, 2007	Kitt Peak	Spacewatch	·	1.4 km	MPC · JPL
683430	2007 TW_{501}	—	October 8, 2007	Mount Lemmon	Mount Lemmon Survey	AGN	820 m	MPC · JPL
683431	2007 TR_{502}	—	October 15, 2007	Mount Lemmon	Mount Lemmon Survey	·	1.6 km	MPC · JPL
683432	2007 TX_{502}	—	October 8, 2007	Mount Lemmon	Mount Lemmon Survey	·	1.3 km	MPC · JPL
683433	2007 TY_{502}	—	October 11, 2007	Mount Lemmon	Mount Lemmon Survey	·	1.4 km	MPC · JPL
683434	2007 TJ_{504}	—	October 10, 2007	Mount Lemmon	Mount Lemmon Survey	·	900 m	MPC · JPL
683435	2007 TH_{510}	—	October 11, 2007	Mount Lemmon	Mount Lemmon Survey	LIX	2.3 km	MPC · JPL
683436	2007 UY_{5}	—	October 20, 2007	Tiki	Teamo, N.	·	1.5 km	MPC · JPL
683437	2007 UV_{16}	—	October 7, 2007	Mount Lemmon	Mount Lemmon Survey	KOR	980 m	MPC · JPL
683438	2007 UN_{28}	—	October 16, 2007	Mount Lemmon	Mount Lemmon Survey	·	1.6 km	MPC · JPL
683439	2007 UJ_{30}	—	October 10, 2007	Catalina	CSS	·	3.7 km	MPC · JPL
683440	2007 UL_{34}	—	September 10, 2007	Kitt Peak	Spacewatch	·	1.6 km	MPC · JPL
683441	2007 UA_{35}	—	October 19, 2007	Kitt Peak	Spacewatch	·	1.7 km	MPC · JPL
683442	2007 UZ_{38}	—	October 20, 2007	Mount Lemmon	Mount Lemmon Survey	·	3.2 km	MPC · JPL
683443	2007 UY_{43}	—	September 13, 2007	Mount Lemmon	Mount Lemmon Survey	·	1.6 km	MPC · JPL
683444	2007 UU_{51}	—	October 16, 2007	Kitt Peak	Spacewatch	·	700 m	MPC · JPL
683445	2007 UB_{53}	—	October 16, 2007	Kitt Peak	Spacewatch	·	920 m	MPC · JPL
683446	2007 UG_{55}	—	October 30, 2007	Kitt Peak	Spacewatch	NYS	840 m	MPC · JPL
683447	2007 UK_{58}	—	October 30, 2007	Mount Lemmon	Mount Lemmon Survey	·	1.4 km	MPC · JPL
683448	2007 UD_{61}	—	October 30, 2007	Mount Lemmon	Mount Lemmon Survey	·	1.6 km	MPC · JPL
683449	2007 UW_{64}	—	October 30, 2007	Mount Lemmon	Mount Lemmon Survey	AGN	910 m	MPC · JPL
683450	2007 UU_{70}	—	October 30, 2007	Mount Lemmon	Mount Lemmon Survey	·	1.4 km	MPC · JPL
683451	2007 US_{72}	—	October 7, 2007	Mount Lemmon	Mount Lemmon Survey	·	1.3 km	MPC · JPL
683452	2007 UR_{78}	—	October 18, 2007	Kitt Peak	Spacewatch	·	1.6 km	MPC · JPL
683453	2007 UJ_{79}	—	December 22, 2003	Kitt Peak	Spacewatch	·	1.4 km	MPC · JPL
683454	2007 UV_{89}	—	October 8, 2007	Kitt Peak	Spacewatch	·	910 m	MPC · JPL
683455	2007 UX_{93}	—	October 31, 2007	Mount Lemmon	Mount Lemmon Survey	·	690 m	MPC · JPL
683456	2007 UM_{94}	—	October 6, 2002	Palomar	NEAT	·	1.5 km	MPC · JPL
683457	2007 UF_{101}	—	October 10, 2007	Mount Lemmon	Mount Lemmon Survey	·	900 m	MPC · JPL
683458	2007 UU_{108}	—	October 30, 2007	Kitt Peak	Spacewatch	THM	1.7 km	MPC · JPL
683459	2007 UE_{110}	—	October 12, 2007	Kitt Peak	Spacewatch	·	3.4 km	MPC · JPL
683460	2007 US_{110}	—	October 30, 2007	Mount Lemmon	Mount Lemmon Survey	HOF	2.0 km	MPC · JPL
683461	2007 UJ_{117}	—	October 31, 2007	Mount Lemmon	Mount Lemmon Survey	·	1.3 km	MPC · JPL
683462	2007 UV_{119}	—	September 12, 2007	Mount Lemmon	Mount Lemmon Survey	·	850 m	MPC · JPL
683463	2007 UA_{122}	—	October 8, 2007	Mount Lemmon	Mount Lemmon Survey	·	850 m	MPC · JPL
683464	2007 UQ_{134}	—	October 30, 2007	Mount Lemmon	Mount Lemmon Survey	·	1.5 km	MPC · JPL
683465	2007 UB_{144}	—	October 18, 2007	Mount Lemmon	Mount Lemmon Survey	·	980 m	MPC · JPL
683466	2007 UE_{144}	—	October 18, 2007	Mount Lemmon	Mount Lemmon Survey	·	1.4 km	MPC · JPL
683467	2007 UL_{146}	—	October 18, 2007	Kitt Peak	Spacewatch	·	1.6 km	MPC · JPL
683468	2007 UK_{147}	—	September 26, 2003	Apache Point	SDSS Collaboration	·	860 m	MPC · JPL
683469	2007 UL_{148}	—	April 11, 1996	Kitt Peak	Spacewatch	AGN	1.2 km	MPC · JPL
683470	2007 UN_{148}	—	April 4, 2014	Haleakala	Pan-STARRS 1	·	1.7 km	MPC · JPL
683471	2007 UU_{149}	—	November 12, 2012	Mount Lemmon	Mount Lemmon Survey	AGN	1.0 km	MPC · JPL
683472	2007 UW_{151}	—	July 27, 2011	Haleakala	Pan-STARRS 1	·	1.6 km	MPC · JPL
683473	2007 UJ_{154}	—	October 21, 2012	Mount Lemmon	Mount Lemmon Survey	·	1.5 km	MPC · JPL
683474	2007 UF_{155}	—	October 16, 2007	Kitt Peak	Spacewatch	·	1.0 km	MPC · JPL
683475	2007 UH_{155}	—	October 20, 2007	Mount Lemmon	Mount Lemmon Survey	·	1.0 km	MPC · JPL
683476	2007 UT_{156}	—	October 18, 2007	Kitt Peak	Spacewatch	PAD	1.4 km	MPC · JPL
683477	2007 UB_{159}	—	October 18, 2007	Kitt Peak	Spacewatch	·	3.6 km	MPC · JPL
683478	2007 UV_{159}	—	October 20, 2007	Mount Lemmon	Mount Lemmon Survey	·	1.5 km	MPC · JPL
683479	2007 UO_{163}	—	October 16, 2007	Mount Lemmon	Mount Lemmon Survey	AGN	870 m	MPC · JPL
683480	2007 UU_{163}	—	October 21, 2007	Mount Lemmon	Mount Lemmon Survey	·	1.8 km	MPC · JPL
683481	2007 UV_{163}	—	October 16, 2007	Mount Lemmon	Mount Lemmon Survey	KOR	1.1 km	MPC · JPL
683482	2007 UY_{163}	—	October 20, 2007	Mount Lemmon	Mount Lemmon Survey	·	1.6 km	MPC · JPL
683483	2007 UJ_{164}	—	October 30, 2007	Kitt Peak	Spacewatch	·	1.6 km	MPC · JPL
683484	2007 US_{164}	—	October 18, 2007	Mount Lemmon	Mount Lemmon Survey	HOF	2.0 km	MPC · JPL
683485	2007 UV_{164}	—	October 16, 2007	Mount Lemmon	Mount Lemmon Survey	·	1.6 km	MPC · JPL
683486	2007 UY_{165}	—	October 30, 2007	Mount Lemmon	Mount Lemmon Survey	AGN	940 m	MPC · JPL
683487	2007 UT_{166}	—	October 20, 2007	Mount Lemmon	Mount Lemmon Survey	EOS	1.2 km	MPC · JPL
683488	2007 VN	—	November 1, 2007	Mount Lemmon	Mount Lemmon Survey	KOR	960 m	MPC · JPL
683489	2007 VZ_{12}	—	November 1, 2007	Mount Lemmon	Mount Lemmon Survey	·	1.7 km	MPC · JPL
683490	2007 VH_{19}	—	November 1, 2007	Mount Lemmon	Mount Lemmon Survey	·	1.4 km	MPC · JPL
683491	2007 VN_{21}	—	November 2, 2007	Mount Lemmon	Mount Lemmon Survey	HOF	2.0 km	MPC · JPL
683492	2007 VX_{25}	—	November 2, 2007	Mount Lemmon	Mount Lemmon Survey	·	1.5 km	MPC · JPL
683493	2007 VV_{26}	—	October 14, 2007	Mount Lemmon	Mount Lemmon Survey	·	790 m	MPC · JPL
683494	2007 VH_{33}	—	July 19, 2007	Mount Lemmon	Mount Lemmon Survey	HYG	2.5 km	MPC · JPL
683495	2007 VB_{34}	—	October 11, 2007	Kitt Peak	Spacewatch	·	1.6 km	MPC · JPL
683496	2007 VD_{35}	—	November 3, 2007	Kitt Peak	Spacewatch	·	1.3 km	MPC · JPL
683497	2007 VO_{39}	—	September 15, 2007	Mount Lemmon	Mount Lemmon Survey	MIS	2.1 km	MPC · JPL
683498	2007 VT_{39}	—	November 3, 2007	Kitt Peak	Spacewatch	·	1.7 km	MPC · JPL
683499	2007 VY_{49}	—	November 1, 2007	Kitt Peak	Spacewatch	·	1.4 km	MPC · JPL
683500	2007 VP_{51}	—	November 1, 2007	Kitt Peak	Spacewatch	HOF	2.2 km	MPC · JPL

== 683501–683600 ==
back to top

Designation			Discovery			Properties		Ref
Permanent	Provisional	Named after	Date	Site	Discoverer(s)	Category	Diam.	Ref
683501	2007 VY_{59}	—	November 2, 2007	Mount Lemmon	Mount Lemmon Survey	·	1.5 km	MPC · JPL
683502	2007 VL_{61}	—	September 20, 2003	Kitt Peak	Spacewatch	V	520 m	MPC · JPL
683503	2007 VS_{65}	—	October 16, 2007	Mount Lemmon	Mount Lemmon Survey	PHO	650 m	MPC · JPL
683504	2007 VU_{66}	—	November 2, 2007	Kitt Peak	Spacewatch	·	1.5 km	MPC · JPL
683505	2007 VA_{68}	—	November 3, 2007	Mount Lemmon	Mount Lemmon Survey	·	2.7 km	MPC · JPL
683506	2007 VL_{69}	—	November 4, 2007	Mount Lemmon	Mount Lemmon Survey	ELF	3.8 km	MPC · JPL
683507	2007 VM_{69}	—	October 10, 2007	Catalina	CSS	·	2.1 km	MPC · JPL
683508	2007 VB_{73}	—	October 8, 2007	Mount Lemmon	Mount Lemmon Survey	·	1.6 km	MPC · JPL
683509	2007 VW_{78}	—	November 3, 2007	Kitt Peak	Spacewatch	·	2.9 km	MPC · JPL
683510	2007 VK_{79}	—	November 3, 2007	Kitt Peak	Spacewatch	·	760 m	MPC · JPL
683511	2007 VL_{80}	—	November 3, 2007	Kitt Peak	Spacewatch	·	1.4 km	MPC · JPL
683512	2007 VR_{81}	—	October 10, 2007	Kitt Peak	Spacewatch	·	1.6 km	MPC · JPL
683513	2007 VV_{102}	—	October 9, 2007	Mount Lemmon	Mount Lemmon Survey	·	1.4 km	MPC · JPL
683514	2007 VA_{105}	—	November 3, 2007	Kitt Peak	Spacewatch	·	1.5 km	MPC · JPL
683515	2007 VR_{115}	—	November 3, 2007	Kitt Peak	Spacewatch	·	1.9 km	MPC · JPL
683516	2007 VH_{117}	—	November 3, 2007	Kitt Peak	Spacewatch	·	1.5 km	MPC · JPL
683517	2007 VZ_{120}	—	November 5, 2007	Kitt Peak	Spacewatch	·	1.6 km	MPC · JPL
683518	2007 VR_{127}	—	September 12, 2007	Mount Lemmon	Mount Lemmon Survey	·	820 m	MPC · JPL
683519	2007 VJ_{133}	—	October 9, 2007	Mount Lemmon	Mount Lemmon Survey	·	530 m	MPC · JPL
683520	2007 VY_{134}	—	April 30, 2006	Kitt Peak	Spacewatch	·	800 m	MPC · JPL
683521	2007 VJ_{139}	—	March 9, 2005	Mount Lemmon	Mount Lemmon Survey	·	940 m	MPC · JPL
683522	2007 VV_{150}	—	November 7, 2007	Kitt Peak	Spacewatch	·	2.5 km	MPC · JPL
683523	2007 VK_{157}	—	November 5, 2007	Kitt Peak	Spacewatch	NYS	1.0 km	MPC · JPL
683524	2007 VQ_{158}	—	November 5, 2007	Kitt Peak	Spacewatch	SYL	3.9 km	MPC · JPL
683525	2007 VA_{160}	—	November 5, 2007	Kitt Peak	Spacewatch	AGN	1.1 km	MPC · JPL
683526	2007 VY_{160}	—	November 5, 2007	Kitt Peak	Spacewatch	AGN	1.1 km	MPC · JPL
683527	2007 VM_{162}	—	November 1, 2007	Kitt Peak	Spacewatch	·	1.7 km	MPC · JPL
683528	2007 VC_{163}	—	November 5, 2007	Kitt Peak	Spacewatch	KOR	1.2 km	MPC · JPL
683529	2007 VE_{166}	—	November 5, 2007	Kitt Peak	Spacewatch	·	970 m	MPC · JPL
683530	2007 VS_{170}	—	October 8, 2007	Mount Lemmon	Mount Lemmon Survey	MAS	480 m	MPC · JPL
683531	2007 VT_{175}	—	November 4, 2007	Mount Lemmon	Mount Lemmon Survey	AGN	870 m	MPC · JPL
683532	2007 VY_{185}	—	October 18, 2007	Kitt Peak	Spacewatch	·	1.6 km	MPC · JPL
683533	2007 VH_{194}	—	November 5, 2007	Mount Lemmon	Mount Lemmon Survey	·	870 m	MPC · JPL
683534	2007 VS_{200}	—	November 9, 2007	Mount Lemmon	Mount Lemmon Survey	·	1.4 km	MPC · JPL
683535	2007 VL_{203}	—	October 12, 2007	Mount Lemmon	Mount Lemmon Survey	AGN	900 m	MPC · JPL
683536	2007 VU_{203}	—	November 9, 2007	Kitt Peak	Spacewatch	·	1.9 km	MPC · JPL
683537	2007 VW_{222}	—	November 7, 2007	Mount Lemmon	Mount Lemmon Survey	·	1.3 km	MPC · JPL
683538	2007 VR_{229}	—	October 21, 2007	Mount Lemmon	Mount Lemmon Survey	EUN	1.1 km	MPC · JPL
683539	2007 VR_{231}	—	November 7, 2007	Kitt Peak	Spacewatch	·	1.4 km	MPC · JPL
683540	2007 VS_{234}	—	November 9, 2007	Kitt Peak	Spacewatch	KOR	1.1 km	MPC · JPL
683541	2007 VO_{235}	—	September 14, 2007	Mount Lemmon	Mount Lemmon Survey	·	820 m	MPC · JPL
683542	2007 VS_{236}	—	October 30, 2007	Mount Lemmon	Mount Lemmon Survey	·	980 m	MPC · JPL
683543	2007 VW_{237}	—	October 10, 2007	Mount Lemmon	Mount Lemmon Survey	·	850 m	MPC · JPL
683544	2007 VP_{256}	—	October 12, 2007	Mount Lemmon	Mount Lemmon Survey	·	960 m	MPC · JPL
683545	2007 VL_{258}	—	November 15, 2007	Mount Lemmon	Mount Lemmon Survey	V	490 m	MPC · JPL
683546	2007 VT_{259}	—	November 15, 2007	Mount Lemmon	Mount Lemmon Survey	·	1.9 km	MPC · JPL
683547	2007 VL_{260}	—	November 2, 2007	Mount Lemmon	Mount Lemmon Survey	·	1.5 km	MPC · JPL
683548	2007 VN_{260}	—	November 15, 2007	Mount Lemmon	Mount Lemmon Survey	·	1.4 km	MPC · JPL
683549	2007 VB_{274}	—	November 12, 2007	Catalina	CSS	·	2.4 km	MPC · JPL
683550	2007 VR_{275}	—	November 13, 2007	Kitt Peak	Spacewatch	MAS	560 m	MPC · JPL
683551	2007 VY_{276}	—	October 16, 2007	Mount Lemmon	Mount Lemmon Survey	·	1.6 km	MPC · JPL
683552	2007 VG_{279}	—	November 14, 2007	Kitt Peak	Spacewatch	MAS	500 m	MPC · JPL
683553	2007 VV_{281}	—	November 3, 2007	Kitt Peak	Spacewatch	·	1.9 km	MPC · JPL
683554	2007 VA_{285}	—	November 5, 2007	Kitt Peak	Spacewatch	·	1.5 km	MPC · JPL
683555	2007 VK_{285}	—	November 9, 2007	Kitt Peak	Spacewatch	TRE	1.8 km	MPC · JPL
683556	2007 VN_{290}	—	November 14, 2007	Kitt Peak	Spacewatch	NEM	2.1 km	MPC · JPL
683557	2007 VF_{291}	—	November 14, 2007	Kitt Peak	Spacewatch	·	1.3 km	MPC · JPL
683558	2007 VE_{292}	—	November 14, 2007	Kitt Peak	Spacewatch	·	1.4 km	MPC · JPL
683559	2007 VK_{294}	—	November 9, 2007	Kitt Peak	Spacewatch	·	730 m	MPC · JPL
683560	2007 VW_{296}	—	November 15, 2007	Mount Lemmon	Mount Lemmon Survey	·	1.3 km	MPC · JPL
683561	2007 VX_{305}	—	November 6, 2007	Kitt Peak	Spacewatch	·	2.1 km	MPC · JPL
683562	2007 VJ_{308}	—	November 5, 2007	Kitt Peak	Spacewatch	NYS	940 m	MPC · JPL
683563	2007 VJ_{318}	—	November 2, 2007	Mount Lemmon	Mount Lemmon Survey	·	1.7 km	MPC · JPL
683564	2007 VX_{318}	—	September 30, 2003	Kitt Peak	Spacewatch	·	1.1 km	MPC · JPL
683565	2007 VA_{319}	—	November 2, 2007	Mount Lemmon	Mount Lemmon Survey	·	1.4 km	MPC · JPL
683566	2007 VE_{320}	—	October 12, 2007	Mount Lemmon	Mount Lemmon Survey	·	1.1 km	MPC · JPL
683567	2007 VH_{324}	—	November 5, 2007	Kitt Peak	Spacewatch	·	1.4 km	MPC · JPL
683568	2007 VR_{330}	—	November 4, 2007	Kitt Peak	Spacewatch	·	2.0 km	MPC · JPL
683569	2007 VW_{332}	—	November 8, 2007	Mount Lemmon	Mount Lemmon Survey	EUN	1.2 km	MPC · JPL
683570	2007 VN_{338}	—	November 3, 2007	Kitt Peak	Spacewatch	·	1.3 km	MPC · JPL
683571	2007 VU_{339}	—	November 7, 2007	Kitt Peak	Spacewatch	·	1.6 km	MPC · JPL
683572	2007 VW_{341}	—	November 11, 2007	Mount Lemmon	Mount Lemmon Survey	·	2.0 km	MPC · JPL
683573	2007 VZ_{342}	—	November 11, 2007	Mount Lemmon	Mount Lemmon Survey	·	2.7 km	MPC · JPL
683574	2007 VF_{343}	—	November 7, 2007	Kitt Peak	Spacewatch	·	1.5 km	MPC · JPL
683575	2007 VP_{343}	—	March 1, 2009	Kitt Peak	Spacewatch	·	630 m	MPC · JPL
683576	2007 VD_{344}	—	April 9, 2010	Mount Lemmon	Mount Lemmon Survey	·	1.5 km	MPC · JPL
683577	2007 VM_{344}	—	November 21, 2017	Haleakala	Pan-STARRS 1	·	1.3 km	MPC · JPL
683578	2007 VC_{345}	—	January 17, 2015	Mount Lemmon	Mount Lemmon Survey	·	640 m	MPC · JPL
683579	2007 VK_{346}	—	October 1, 2013	Mount Lemmon	Mount Lemmon Survey	·	2.8 km	MPC · JPL
683580	2007 VM_{348}	—	August 27, 2006	Kitt Peak	Spacewatch	·	3.4 km	MPC · JPL
683581	2007 VC_{350}	—	November 2, 2007	Kitt Peak	Spacewatch	BRA	1.2 km	MPC · JPL
683582	2007 VN_{350}	—	January 15, 2016	Haleakala	Pan-STARRS 1	PHO	830 m	MPC · JPL
683583	2007 VM_{351}	—	October 12, 2015	Haleakala	Pan-STARRS 1	·	680 m	MPC · JPL
683584	2007 VP_{355}	—	November 9, 2007	Mount Lemmon	Mount Lemmon Survey	V	550 m	MPC · JPL
683585	2007 VG_{356}	—	September 19, 2011	Mount Lemmon	Mount Lemmon Survey	·	1.6 km	MPC · JPL
683586	2007 VR_{357}	—	September 30, 2016	Haleakala	Pan-STARRS 1	HOF	1.9 km	MPC · JPL
683587	2007 VZ_{357}	—	November 8, 2007	Kitt Peak	Spacewatch	·	1.5 km	MPC · JPL
683588	2007 VA_{359}	—	December 23, 2012	Haleakala	Pan-STARRS 1	·	1.5 km	MPC · JPL
683589	2007 VL_{361}	—	July 28, 2011	Haleakala	Pan-STARRS 1	MRX	750 m	MPC · JPL
683590	2007 VV_{362}	—	November 5, 2007	Mount Lemmon	Mount Lemmon Survey	·	1.3 km	MPC · JPL
683591	2007 VA_{363}	—	November 4, 2007	Kitt Peak	Spacewatch	·	1.5 km	MPC · JPL
683592	2007 VV_{363}	—	November 8, 2007	Kitt Peak	Spacewatch	HOF	2.0 km	MPC · JPL
683593	2007 VW_{363}	—	November 9, 2007	Mount Lemmon	Mount Lemmon Survey	·	1.8 km	MPC · JPL
683594	2007 VG_{364}	—	November 2, 2007	Kitt Peak	Spacewatch	·	1.6 km	MPC · JPL
683595	2007 VN_{364}	—	November 14, 2007	Kitt Peak	Spacewatch	·	690 m	MPC · JPL
683596	2007 VQ_{365}	—	November 7, 2007	Kitt Peak	Spacewatch	KOR	1.3 km	MPC · JPL
683597	2007 VG_{366}	—	November 8, 2007	Kitt Peak	Spacewatch	·	1.2 km	MPC · JPL
683598	2007 VJ_{367}	—	November 7, 2007	Kitt Peak	Spacewatch	DOR	2.2 km	MPC · JPL
683599	2007 VA_{372}	—	November 3, 2007	Kitt Peak	Spacewatch	SYL	2.8 km	MPC · JPL
683600	2007 VW_{372}	—	November 3, 2007	Kitt Peak	Spacewatch	MAS	550 m	MPC · JPL

== 683601–683700 ==
back to top

Designation			Discovery			Properties		Ref
Permanent	Provisional	Named after	Date	Site	Discoverer(s)	Category	Diam.	Ref
683601	2007 VW_{374}	—	November 12, 2007	Mount Lemmon	Mount Lemmon Survey	·	1.5 km	MPC · JPL
683602	2007 VO_{378}	—	November 7, 2007	Kitt Peak	Spacewatch	KOR	1.2 km	MPC · JPL
683603	2007 VH_{379}	—	November 11, 2007	Mount Lemmon	Mount Lemmon Survey	·	1.3 km	MPC · JPL
683604	2007 VV_{381}	—	November 4, 2007	Mount Lemmon	Mount Lemmon Survey	·	1.6 km	MPC · JPL
683605	2007 WF_{5}	—	November 14, 2007	Kitt Peak	Spacewatch	NYS	870 m	MPC · JPL
683606	2007 WF_{11}	—	October 19, 2007	Lulin	LUSS	MAR	1.1 km	MPC · JPL
683607	2007 WQ_{14}	—	November 7, 2007	Kitt Peak	Spacewatch	·	1.7 km	MPC · JPL
683608	2007 WN_{17}	—	August 28, 2006	Kitt Peak	Spacewatch	·	1.8 km	MPC · JPL
683609	2007 WE_{20}	—	September 30, 2006	Mount Lemmon	Mount Lemmon Survey	·	3.6 km	MPC · JPL
683610	2007 WT_{28}	—	November 19, 2007	Kitt Peak	Spacewatch	·	2.9 km	MPC · JPL
683611	2007 WZ_{31}	—	November 19, 2007	Mount Lemmon	Mount Lemmon Survey	(2076)	680 m	MPC · JPL
683612	2007 WS_{33}	—	November 4, 2007	Kitt Peak	Spacewatch	·	1.6 km	MPC · JPL
683613	2007 WV_{33}	—	November 8, 2007	Kitt Peak	Spacewatch	AGN	1.0 km	MPC · JPL
683614	2007 WE_{36}	—	November 2, 2007	Kitt Peak	Spacewatch	·	1.8 km	MPC · JPL
683615	2007 WN_{36}	—	November 19, 2007	Mount Lemmon	Mount Lemmon Survey	·	1.6 km	MPC · JPL
683616	2007 WG_{37}	—	November 19, 2007	Mount Lemmon	Mount Lemmon Survey	·	1.4 km	MPC · JPL
683617	2007 WR_{38}	—	November 19, 2007	Mount Lemmon	Mount Lemmon Survey	·	1.7 km	MPC · JPL
683618	2007 WT_{45}	—	November 20, 2007	Mount Lemmon	Mount Lemmon Survey	·	1.2 km	MPC · JPL
683619	2007 WC_{49}	—	November 8, 2007	Kitt Peak	Spacewatch	·	1.6 km	MPC · JPL
683620	2007 WB_{51}	—	November 20, 2007	Mount Lemmon	Mount Lemmon Survey	·	1.6 km	MPC · JPL
683621	2007 WN_{51}	—	November 20, 2007	Mount Lemmon	Mount Lemmon Survey	KOR	1.2 km	MPC · JPL
683622	2007 WO_{51}	—	November 8, 2007	Kitt Peak	Spacewatch	NYS	900 m	MPC · JPL
683623	2007 WV_{59}	—	November 19, 2007	Kitt Peak	Spacewatch	·	1.2 km	MPC · JPL
683624	2007 WL_{65}	—	January 30, 2009	Mount Lemmon	Mount Lemmon Survey	·	770 m	MPC · JPL
683625	2007 WO_{65}	—	November 17, 2007	Kitt Peak	Spacewatch	AGN	1.1 km	MPC · JPL
683626	2007 WY_{66}	—	December 30, 2008	Mount Lemmon	Mount Lemmon Survey	·	2.9 km	MPC · JPL
683627	2007 WM_{68}	—	May 28, 2014	Haleakala	Pan-STARRS 1	H	370 m	MPC · JPL
683628	2007 WY_{69}	—	November 21, 2007	Mount Lemmon	Mount Lemmon Survey	AGN	1.0 km	MPC · JPL
683629	2007 WM_{70}	—	March 23, 2014	Mount Lemmon	Mount Lemmon Survey	·	1.5 km	MPC · JPL
683630	2007 WC_{71}	—	November 19, 2007	Kitt Peak	Spacewatch	·	1.8 km	MPC · JPL
683631	2007 WT_{71}	—	November 20, 2007	Kitt Peak	Spacewatch	·	1.5 km	MPC · JPL
683632	2007 WJ_{72}	—	November 20, 2007	Mount Lemmon	Mount Lemmon Survey	·	980 m	MPC · JPL
683633	2007 WO_{72}	—	November 18, 2007	Kitt Peak	Spacewatch	·	1.3 km	MPC · JPL
683634	2007 XD_{7}	—	November 13, 2007	Kitt Peak	Spacewatch	KOR	1.2 km	MPC · JPL
683635	2007 XV_{17}	—	December 6, 2007	Kitt Peak	Spacewatch	·	1.5 km	MPC · JPL
683636	2007 XS_{23}	—	September 28, 2003	Kitt Peak	Spacewatch	MAS	740 m	MPC · JPL
683637	2007 XO_{58}	—	November 19, 2007	Lulin	LUSS	·	710 m	MPC · JPL
683638	2007 XT_{59}	—	October 17, 2010	Mount Lemmon	Mount Lemmon Survey	·	870 m	MPC · JPL
683639	2007 XH_{61}	—	February 28, 2014	Haleakala	Pan-STARRS 1	KOR	1.3 km	MPC · JPL
683640	2007 XM_{63}	—	September 18, 2011	Mount Lemmon	Mount Lemmon Survey	KOR	1.1 km	MPC · JPL
683641	2007 XR_{64}	—	September 2, 2016	Mount Lemmon	Mount Lemmon Survey	·	1.8 km	MPC · JPL
683642	2007 XU_{65}	—	September 11, 2014	Haleakala	Pan-STARRS 1	·	950 m	MPC · JPL
683643	2007 XR_{66}	—	April 9, 2016	Haleakala	Pan-STARRS 1	V	490 m	MPC · JPL
683644	2007 XG_{67}	—	December 5, 2007	Kitt Peak	Spacewatch	AGN	980 m	MPC · JPL
683645	2007 XH_{67}	—	December 4, 2007	Mount Lemmon	Mount Lemmon Survey	·	1.9 km	MPC · JPL
683646	2007 XX_{67}	—	January 5, 2013	Kitt Peak	Spacewatch	·	1.2 km	MPC · JPL
683647	2007 XL_{69}	—	December 5, 2007	Kitt Peak	Spacewatch	AGN	1.1 km	MPC · JPL
683648	2007 XP_{69}	—	December 4, 2007	Kitt Peak	Spacewatch	AGN	1.1 km	MPC · JPL
683649	2007 XK_{70}	—	December 5, 2007	Kitt Peak	Spacewatch	·	1.6 km	MPC · JPL
683650	2007 XN_{70}	—	December 4, 2007	Mount Lemmon	Mount Lemmon Survey	·	1.5 km	MPC · JPL
683651	2007 XU_{70}	—	December 4, 2007	Kitt Peak	Spacewatch	AGN	1.0 km	MPC · JPL
683652	2007 XJ_{72}	—	December 15, 2007	Mount Lemmon	Mount Lemmon Survey	KOR	1.1 km	MPC · JPL
683653	2007 YF_{6}	—	November 17, 2007	Mount Lemmon	Mount Lemmon Survey	·	1.7 km	MPC · JPL
683654	2007 YY_{17}	—	December 16, 2007	Kitt Peak	Spacewatch	·	1.2 km	MPC · JPL
683655	2007 YW_{26}	—	December 18, 2007	Mount Lemmon	Mount Lemmon Survey	·	2.3 km	MPC · JPL
683656	2007 YS_{28}	—	December 19, 2007	Kitt Peak	Spacewatch	·	1.5 km	MPC · JPL
683657	2007 YK_{29}	—	December 19, 2007	Piszkéstető	K. Sárneczky	BRA	1.3 km	MPC · JPL
683658	2007 YO_{30}	—	December 28, 2007	Kitt Peak	Spacewatch	H	400 m	MPC · JPL
683659	2007 YG_{38}	—	December 30, 2007	Mount Lemmon	Mount Lemmon Survey	·	610 m	MPC · JPL
683660	2007 YL_{47}	—	December 30, 2007	Kitt Peak	Spacewatch	·	850 m	MPC · JPL
683661	2007 YQ_{50}	—	December 28, 2007	Kitt Peak	Spacewatch	KOR	970 m	MPC · JPL
683662	2007 YO_{78}	—	January 5, 2013	Kitt Peak	Spacewatch	·	1.9 km	MPC · JPL
683663	2007 YP_{78}	—	August 27, 2011	Haleakala	Pan-STARRS 1	·	1.9 km	MPC · JPL
683664	2007 YY_{78}	—	December 18, 2007	Mount Lemmon	Mount Lemmon Survey	·	2.2 km	MPC · JPL
683665	2007 YS_{79}	—	March 18, 2010	Mount Lemmon	Mount Lemmon Survey	·	3.5 km	MPC · JPL
683666	2007 YZ_{79}	—	August 30, 2011	Haleakala	Pan-STARRS 1	·	1.7 km	MPC · JPL
683667	2007 YU_{80}	—	December 19, 2007	Mount Lemmon	Mount Lemmon Survey	·	1.8 km	MPC · JPL
683668	2007 YA_{81}	—	December 30, 2007	Kitt Peak	Spacewatch	·	1.0 km	MPC · JPL
683669	2007 YN_{82}	—	February 20, 2009	Mount Lemmon	Mount Lemmon Survey	HOF	2.1 km	MPC · JPL
683670	2007 YP_{82}	—	April 27, 2009	Mount Lemmon	Mount Lemmon Survey	·	1.5 km	MPC · JPL
683671	2007 YQ_{86}	—	December 31, 2007	Mount Lemmon	Mount Lemmon Survey	·	1.6 km	MPC · JPL
683672	2007 YW_{89}	—	August 19, 2001	Cerro Tololo	Deep Ecliptic Survey	·	1.6 km	MPC · JPL
683673	2007 YD_{90}	—	January 2, 2012	Mount Lemmon	Mount Lemmon Survey	·	970 m	MPC · JPL
683674	2007 YM_{90}	—	December 19, 2007	Mount Lemmon	Mount Lemmon Survey	·	1.7 km	MPC · JPL
683675	2007 YO_{96}	—	December 18, 2007	Mount Lemmon	Mount Lemmon Survey	·	1.4 km	MPC · JPL
683676	2007 YY_{96}	—	December 30, 2007	Kitt Peak	Spacewatch	EOS	1.5 km	MPC · JPL
683677	2007 YF_{99}	—	December 18, 2007	Mount Lemmon	Mount Lemmon Survey	·	1.5 km	MPC · JPL
683678	2008 AA_{14}	—	January 10, 2008	Mount Lemmon	Mount Lemmon Survey	·	1.8 km	MPC · JPL
683679	2008 AW_{14}	—	December 30, 2007	Kitt Peak	Spacewatch	·	940 m	MPC · JPL
683680	2008 AR_{15}	—	January 10, 2008	Mount Lemmon	Mount Lemmon Survey	·	930 m	MPC · JPL
683681	2008 AA_{24}	—	January 10, 2008	Mount Lemmon	Mount Lemmon Survey	·	1.5 km	MPC · JPL
683682	2008 AX_{35}	—	January 10, 2008	Kitt Peak	Spacewatch	MAS	600 m	MPC · JPL
683683	2008 AC_{48}	—	January 11, 2008	Kitt Peak	Spacewatch	KOR	1.0 km	MPC · JPL
683684	2008 AD_{49}	—	January 11, 2008	Kitt Peak	Spacewatch	EOS	1.4 km	MPC · JPL
683685	2008 AX_{50}	—	December 30, 2007	Kitt Peak	Spacewatch	·	1.1 km	MPC · JPL
683686	2008 AA_{51}	—	January 11, 2008	Kitt Peak	Spacewatch	·	1.2 km	MPC · JPL
683687	2008 AN_{54}	—	January 11, 2008	Kitt Peak	Spacewatch	·	1.6 km	MPC · JPL
683688	2008 AT_{55}	—	August 29, 2006	Kitt Peak	Spacewatch	AGN	1 km	MPC · JPL
683689	2008 AJ_{86}	—	January 14, 2008	Kitt Peak	Spacewatch	PHO	820 m	MPC · JPL
683690	2008 AW_{93}	—	December 16, 2007	Mount Lemmon	Mount Lemmon Survey	·	1.4 km	MPC · JPL
683691	2008 AY_{93}	—	October 19, 1998	Kitt Peak	Spacewatch	·	1.4 km	MPC · JPL
683692	2008 AQ_{96}	—	January 14, 2008	Kitt Peak	Spacewatch	·	770 m	MPC · JPL
683693	2008 AF_{97}	—	January 14, 2008	Kitt Peak	Spacewatch	·	1.4 km	MPC · JPL
683694	2008 AR_{118}	—	January 11, 2008	Kitt Peak	Spacewatch	·	740 m	MPC · JPL
683695	2008 AT_{118}	—	January 14, 2008	Kitt Peak	Spacewatch	EOS	1.4 km	MPC · JPL
683696	2008 AD_{119}	—	September 25, 2006	Kitt Peak	Spacewatch	·	1.4 km	MPC · JPL
683697	2008 AH_{119}	—	October 22, 1995	Kitt Peak	Spacewatch	·	960 m	MPC · JPL
683698	2008 AB_{124}	—	January 6, 2008	Mauna Kea	P. A. Wiegert	·	1.4 km	MPC · JPL
683699	2008 AU_{124}	—	January 6, 2008	Mauna Kea	P. A. Wiegert	NYS	830 m	MPC · JPL
683700	2008 AP_{125}	—	January 6, 2008	Mauna Kea	P. A. Wiegert	·	940 m	MPC · JPL

== 683701–683800 ==
back to top

Designation			Discovery			Properties		Ref
Permanent	Provisional	Named after	Date	Site	Discoverer(s)	Category	Diam.	Ref
683701	2008 AF_{130}	—	December 30, 2007	Kitt Peak	Spacewatch	·	1.7 km	MPC · JPL
683702	2008 AK_{133}	—	January 6, 2008	Mauna Kea	P. A. Wiegert, A. M. Gilbert	·	940 m	MPC · JPL
683703	2008 AS_{133}	—	April 15, 2005	Kitt Peak	Spacewatch	NYS	910 m	MPC · JPL
683704	2008 AH_{141}	—	January 11, 2008	Kitt Peak	Spacewatch	·	1.8 km	MPC · JPL
683705	2008 AR_{141}	—	September 24, 2012	Mount Lemmon	Mount Lemmon Survey	3:2	4.7 km	MPC · JPL
683706	2008 AV_{147}	—	October 14, 2010	Mount Lemmon	Mount Lemmon Survey	V	470 m	MPC · JPL
683707	2008 AW_{147}	—	April 24, 2014	Haleakala	Pan-STARRS 1	KOR	1.1 km	MPC · JPL
683708	2008 AN_{149}	—	December 8, 2016	Mount Lemmon	Mount Lemmon Survey	AGN	940 m	MPC · JPL
683709	2008 AA_{150}	—	January 10, 2008	Mount Lemmon	Mount Lemmon Survey	·	2.1 km	MPC · JPL
683710	2008 AO_{153}	—	January 1, 2008	Kitt Peak	Spacewatch	BRA	1.0 km	MPC · JPL
683711	2008 AJ_{154}	—	January 11, 2008	Kitt Peak	Spacewatch	KOR	1.2 km	MPC · JPL
683712	2008 AJ_{156}	—	January 14, 2008	Kitt Peak	Spacewatch	·	1.6 km	MPC · JPL
683713	2008 BO_{8}	—	January 16, 2008	Kitt Peak	Spacewatch	·	620 m	MPC · JPL
683714	2008 BP_{12}	—	February 16, 2004	Kitt Peak	Spacewatch	·	1.4 km	MPC · JPL
683715	2008 BD_{14}	—	January 19, 2008	Mount Lemmon	Mount Lemmon Survey	·	1.6 km	MPC · JPL
683716	2008 BC_{26}	—	November 19, 2003	Kitt Peak	Spacewatch	MAS	540 m	MPC · JPL
683717	2008 BD_{56}	—	October 26, 2011	Haleakala	Pan-STARRS 1	·	1.8 km	MPC · JPL
683718	2008 BU_{57}	—	November 28, 2013	Mount Lemmon	Mount Lemmon Survey	·	770 m	MPC · JPL
683719	2008 BZ_{58}	—	January 18, 2008	Kitt Peak	Spacewatch	·	1.3 km	MPC · JPL
683720	2008 BC_{61}	—	January 17, 2008	Mount Lemmon	Mount Lemmon Survey	·	510 m	MPC · JPL
683721	2008 BL_{61}	—	January 18, 2008	Mount Lemmon	Mount Lemmon Survey	MAR	720 m	MPC · JPL
683722	2008 CD	—	January 12, 2008	Kitt Peak	Spacewatch	H	380 m	MPC · JPL
683723	2008 CL_{2}	—	October 3, 2006	Mount Lemmon	Mount Lemmon Survey	·	1.7 km	MPC · JPL
683724	2008 CC_{3}	—	August 30, 2005	Kitt Peak	Spacewatch	·	2.1 km	MPC · JPL
683725	2008 CF_{3}	—	February 2, 2008	Mount Lemmon	Mount Lemmon Survey	·	980 m	MPC · JPL
683726	2008 CM_{3}	—	January 11, 2008	Mount Lemmon	Mount Lemmon Survey	·	1.5 km	MPC · JPL
683727	2008 CJ_{30}	—	February 2, 2008	Kitt Peak	Spacewatch	·	930 m	MPC · JPL
683728	2008 CQ_{33}	—	February 2, 2008	Kitt Peak	Spacewatch	NYS	850 m	MPC · JPL
683729	2008 CX_{36}	—	February 2, 2008	Kitt Peak	Spacewatch	H	400 m	MPC · JPL
683730	2008 CU_{57}	—	October 2, 2006	Mount Lemmon	Mount Lemmon Survey	·	1.8 km	MPC · JPL
683731	2008 CO_{59}	—	February 7, 2008	Mount Lemmon	Mount Lemmon Survey	·	2.1 km	MPC · JPL
683732	2008 CN_{62}	—	February 8, 2008	Mount Lemmon	Mount Lemmon Survey	·	890 m	MPC · JPL
683733	2008 CR_{63}	—	January 12, 2008	Kitt Peak	Spacewatch	·	1.3 km	MPC · JPL
683734	2008 CT_{65}	—	February 8, 2008	Mount Lemmon	Mount Lemmon Survey	·	1.5 km	MPC · JPL
683735	2008 CR_{78}	—	February 7, 2008	Kitt Peak	Spacewatch	KOR	1.3 km	MPC · JPL
683736	2008 CM_{84}	—	October 7, 2005	Mount Lemmon	Mount Lemmon Survey	·	3.5 km	MPC · JPL
683737	2008 CU_{84}	—	February 7, 2008	Kitt Peak	Spacewatch	·	1.7 km	MPC · JPL
683738	2008 CE_{93}	—	February 8, 2008	Mount Lemmon	Mount Lemmon Survey	·	1.6 km	MPC · JPL
683739	2008 CN_{93}	—	December 17, 2007	Mount Lemmon	Mount Lemmon Survey	·	1.3 km	MPC · JPL
683740	2008 CX_{96}	—	February 9, 2008	Kitt Peak	Spacewatch	·	1.3 km	MPC · JPL
683741	2008 CA_{99}	—	February 9, 2008	Kitt Peak	Spacewatch	·	1.6 km	MPC · JPL
683742	2008 CS_{99}	—	February 9, 2008	Kitt Peak	Spacewatch	KOR	1.1 km	MPC · JPL
683743	2008 CO_{104}	—	February 9, 2008	Mount Lemmon	Mount Lemmon Survey	·	1.3 km	MPC · JPL
683744	2008 CR_{105}	—	February 9, 2008	Mount Lemmon	Mount Lemmon Survey	·	830 m	MPC · JPL
683745	2008 CT_{105}	—	October 2, 2006	Mount Lemmon	Mount Lemmon Survey	·	1.2 km	MPC · JPL
683746	2008 CW_{108}	—	February 9, 2008	Mount Lemmon	Mount Lemmon Survey	·	1.2 km	MPC · JPL
683747	2008 CH_{124}	—	February 7, 2008	Mount Lemmon	Mount Lemmon Survey	NYS	810 m	MPC · JPL
683748	2008 CC_{138}	—	February 8, 2008	Kitt Peak	Spacewatch	KOR	1.4 km	MPC · JPL
683749	2008 CL_{139}	—	December 1, 2003	Kitt Peak	Spacewatch	·	650 m	MPC · JPL
683750	2008 CR_{139}	—	February 8, 2008	Mount Lemmon	Mount Lemmon Survey	EOS	1.6 km	MPC · JPL
683751	2008 CG_{146}	—	February 9, 2008	Kitt Peak	Spacewatch	AGN	1.1 km	MPC · JPL
683752	2008 CR_{147}	—	November 1, 2006	Kitt Peak	Spacewatch	CLA	1.6 km	MPC · JPL
683753	2008 CO_{154}	—	February 9, 2008	Mount Lemmon	Mount Lemmon Survey	WIT	980 m	MPC · JPL
683754	2008 CA_{156}	—	February 9, 2008	Catalina	CSS	·	1.7 km	MPC · JPL
683755	2008 CZ_{156}	—	February 9, 2008	Kitt Peak	Spacewatch	·	1.9 km	MPC · JPL
683756	2008 CT_{160}	—	February 9, 2008	Kitt Peak	Spacewatch	·	1.4 km	MPC · JPL
683757	2008 CD_{164}	—	February 10, 2008	Mount Lemmon	Mount Lemmon Survey	·	1.7 km	MPC · JPL
683758	2008 CZ_{168}	—	February 12, 2008	Mount Lemmon	Mount Lemmon Survey	EOS	1.2 km	MPC · JPL
683759	2008 CR_{188}	—	October 2, 2006	Kitt Peak	Spacewatch	·	2.1 km	MPC · JPL
683760	2008 CT_{196}	—	February 7, 2008	Kitt Peak	Spacewatch	·	1.6 km	MPC · JPL
683761	2008 CB_{206}	—	February 6, 2008	Kitt Peak	Spacewatch	TEL	1.0 km	MPC · JPL
683762	2008 CT_{213}	—	February 10, 2008	Kitt Peak	Spacewatch	·	2.6 km	MPC · JPL
683763	2008 CG_{216}	—	November 23, 2006	Kitt Peak	Spacewatch	·	1.6 km	MPC · JPL
683764	2008 CU_{218}	—	February 11, 2008	Mount Lemmon	Mount Lemmon Survey	·	1.3 km	MPC · JPL
683765	2008 CR_{219}	—	February 10, 2008	Mount Lemmon	Mount Lemmon Survey	KOR	1.3 km	MPC · JPL
683766	2008 CF_{220}	—	February 9, 2008	Catalina	CSS	·	2.7 km	MPC · JPL
683767	2008 CM_{220}	—	February 16, 2013	Mount Lemmon	Mount Lemmon Survey	·	1.6 km	MPC · JPL
683768	2008 CD_{222}	—	June 17, 2013	Mount Lemmon	Mount Lemmon Survey	·	1.1 km	MPC · JPL
683769	2008 CC_{224}	—	February 9, 2008	Mount Lemmon	Mount Lemmon Survey	·	2.1 km	MPC · JPL
683770	2008 CQ_{224}	—	February 28, 2014	Haleakala	Pan-STARRS 1	THM	1.9 km	MPC · JPL
683771	2008 CJ_{225}	—	February 8, 2008	Kitt Peak	Spacewatch	·	1.4 km	MPC · JPL
683772	2008 CX_{225}	—	February 1, 2012	Kitt Peak	Spacewatch	·	1.1 km	MPC · JPL
683773	2008 CQ_{228}	—	March 30, 2016	Haleakala	Pan-STARRS 1	SYL	3.5 km	MPC · JPL
683774	2008 CC_{229}	—	January 10, 2008	Mount Lemmon	Mount Lemmon Survey	SYL	3.5 km	MPC · JPL
683775	2008 CF_{229}	—	March 15, 2013	Mount Lemmon	Mount Lemmon Survey	·	1.4 km	MPC · JPL
683776	2008 CA_{230}	—	February 9, 2013	Haleakala	Pan-STARRS 1	·	1.7 km	MPC · JPL
683777	2008 CG_{234}	—	February 8, 2008	Kitt Peak	Spacewatch	·	1.9 km	MPC · JPL
683778	2008 CQ_{234}	—	December 24, 2017	Haleakala	Pan-STARRS 1	·	1.6 km	MPC · JPL
683779	2008 CD_{235}	—	April 5, 2014	Haleakala	Pan-STARRS 1	·	1.1 km	MPC · JPL
683780	2008 CH_{236}	—	February 7, 2008	Mount Lemmon	Mount Lemmon Survey	TEL	1.1 km	MPC · JPL
683781	2008 CD_{241}	—	February 13, 2008	Kitt Peak	Spacewatch	·	1.3 km	MPC · JPL
683782	2008 CS_{241}	—	February 8, 2008	Mount Lemmon	Mount Lemmon Survey	·	1.6 km	MPC · JPL
683783	2008 CS_{242}	—	February 10, 2008	Kitt Peak	Spacewatch	EOS	1.7 km	MPC · JPL
683784	2008 CB_{243}	—	February 7, 2008	Kitt Peak	Spacewatch	AGN	1 km	MPC · JPL
683785	2008 CR_{243}	—	February 7, 2008	Mount Lemmon	Mount Lemmon Survey	·	1.5 km	MPC · JPL
683786	2008 CG_{244}	—	February 9, 2008	Catalina	CSS	·	1.7 km	MPC · JPL
683787	2008 CY_{244}	—	February 10, 2008	Kitt Peak	Spacewatch	EOS	1.1 km	MPC · JPL
683788	2008 CD_{245}	—	February 10, 2008	Mount Lemmon	Mount Lemmon Survey	BRG	1.1 km	MPC · JPL
683789	2008 CT_{245}	—	February 8, 2008	Kitt Peak	Spacewatch	3:2 · SHU	4.0 km	MPC · JPL
683790	2008 CJ_{246}	—	February 10, 2008	Kitt Peak	Spacewatch	·	1.8 km	MPC · JPL
683791	2008 CD_{247}	—	February 12, 2008	Kitt Peak	Spacewatch	·	2.0 km	MPC · JPL
683792	2008 CS_{247}	—	February 9, 2008	Mount Lemmon	Mount Lemmon Survey	·	460 m	MPC · JPL
683793	2008 CY_{247}	—	February 14, 2008	Mount Lemmon	Mount Lemmon Survey	·	1.4 km	MPC · JPL
683794	2008 CA_{248}	—	February 10, 2008	Kitt Peak	Spacewatch	·	1.5 km	MPC · JPL
683795	2008 CU_{248}	—	February 13, 2008	Kitt Peak	Spacewatch	·	1.9 km	MPC · JPL
683796	2008 CV_{248}	—	February 7, 2008	Kitt Peak	Spacewatch	3:2	3.9 km	MPC · JPL
683797	2008 CT_{249}	—	February 7, 2008	Mount Lemmon	Mount Lemmon Survey	·	920 m	MPC · JPL
683798	2008 CL_{250}	—	February 8, 2008	Mount Lemmon	Mount Lemmon Survey	EOS	1.2 km	MPC · JPL
683799	2008 CO_{250}	—	February 9, 2008	Mount Lemmon	Mount Lemmon Survey	·	950 m	MPC · JPL
683800	2008 DP_{6}	—	February 24, 2008	Mount Lemmon	Mount Lemmon Survey	·	1.7 km	MPC · JPL

== 683801–683900 ==
back to top

Designation			Discovery			Properties		Ref
Permanent	Provisional	Named after	Date	Site	Discoverer(s)	Category	Diam.	Ref
683801	2008 DL_{12}	—	February 7, 2008	Kitt Peak	Spacewatch	·	1.4 km	MPC · JPL
683802	2008 DF_{29}	—	February 2, 2008	Kitt Peak	Spacewatch	·	1.1 km	MPC · JPL
683803	2008 DB_{43}	—	February 28, 2008	Kitt Peak	Spacewatch	·	1.8 km	MPC · JPL
683804	2008 DX_{44}	—	November 24, 2006	Mount Lemmon	Mount Lemmon Survey	AGN	1.0 km	MPC · JPL
683805	2008 DP_{45}	—	February 28, 2008	Mount Lemmon	Mount Lemmon Survey	EOS	1.4 km	MPC · JPL
683806	2008 DV_{51}	—	January 18, 2008	Mount Lemmon	Mount Lemmon Survey	·	2.0 km	MPC · JPL
683807	2008 DE_{61}	—	February 28, 2008	Mount Lemmon	Mount Lemmon Survey	·	1.7 km	MPC · JPL
683808	2008 DH_{62}	—	February 28, 2008	Mount Lemmon	Mount Lemmon Survey	·	990 m	MPC · JPL
683809	2008 DT_{63}	—	February 28, 2008	Mount Lemmon	Mount Lemmon Survey	EOS	1.2 km	MPC · JPL
683810	2008 DK_{64}	—	February 28, 2008	Mount Lemmon	Mount Lemmon Survey	·	1.1 km	MPC · JPL
683811	2008 DF_{74}	—	February 28, 2008	Mount Lemmon	Mount Lemmon Survey	KOR	1.0 km	MPC · JPL
683812	2008 DP_{76}	—	February 28, 2008	Mount Lemmon	Mount Lemmon Survey	·	2.4 km	MPC · JPL
683813	2008 DT_{79}	—	February 29, 2008	Catalina	CSS	·	1.5 km	MPC · JPL
683814	2008 DH_{96}	—	February 28, 2008	Mount Lemmon	Mount Lemmon Survey	·	1.1 km	MPC · JPL
683815	2008 DP_{96}	—	February 18, 2008	Mount Lemmon	Mount Lemmon Survey	·	2.5 km	MPC · JPL
683816	2008 DQ_{96}	—	November 16, 2006	Kitt Peak	Spacewatch	·	1.3 km	MPC · JPL
683817	2008 DM_{97}	—	February 28, 2008	Mount Lemmon	Mount Lemmon Survey	KOR	1.1 km	MPC · JPL
683818	2008 EB_{4}	—	March 1, 2008	Mount Lemmon	Mount Lemmon Survey	·	2.4 km	MPC · JPL
683819	2008 EC_{7}	—	October 16, 2006	Kitt Peak	Spacewatch	·	1.6 km	MPC · JPL
683820	2008 ER_{12}	—	February 10, 2008	Kitt Peak	Spacewatch	3:2	4.0 km	MPC · JPL
683821	2008 EK_{14}	—	February 14, 2002	Kitt Peak	Spacewatch	·	3.5 km	MPC · JPL
683822	2008 EM_{31}	—	March 5, 2008	Mount Lemmon	Mount Lemmon Survey	·	1.6 km	MPC · JPL
683823	2008 EB_{35}	—	March 2, 2008	Mount Lemmon	Mount Lemmon Survey	·	1.3 km	MPC · JPL
683824	2008 EF_{45}	—	November 18, 2003	Kitt Peak	Spacewatch	·	610 m	MPC · JPL
683825	2008 ES_{45}	—	March 5, 2008	Mount Lemmon	Mount Lemmon Survey	NAE	1.7 km	MPC · JPL
683826	2008 EA_{52}	—	November 17, 2006	Mount Lemmon	Mount Lemmon Survey	PAD	1.6 km	MPC · JPL
683827	2008 ET_{55}	—	May 1, 2019	Haleakala	Pan-STARRS 1	KOR	1.1 km	MPC · JPL
683828	2008 EY_{61}	—	March 9, 2008	Mount Lemmon	Mount Lemmon Survey	·	1.6 km	MPC · JPL
683829	2008 ER_{67}	—	March 9, 2008	Mount Lemmon	Mount Lemmon Survey	PHO	720 m	MPC · JPL
683830	2008 EK_{80}	—	January 11, 2008	Kitt Peak	Spacewatch	·	610 m	MPC · JPL
683831	2008 ES_{80}	—	August 28, 2003	Palomar	NEAT	·	700 m	MPC · JPL
683832	2008 EO_{81}	—	March 6, 2008	Mount Lemmon	Mount Lemmon Survey	·	2.0 km	MPC · JPL
683833	2008 ET_{86}	—	March 7, 2008	Kitt Peak	Spacewatch	·	1.6 km	MPC · JPL
683834	2008 EM_{90}	—	March 8, 2008	Kitt Peak	Spacewatch	·	830 m	MPC · JPL
683835	2008 EL_{93}	—	March 1, 2008	Mount Lemmon	Mount Lemmon Survey	·	1.9 km	MPC · JPL
683836	2008 EH_{95}	—	March 6, 2008	Mount Lemmon	Mount Lemmon Survey	·	1.7 km	MPC · JPL
683837	2008 EX_{95}	—	March 6, 2008	Mount Lemmon	Mount Lemmon Survey	·	1.7 km	MPC · JPL
683838	2008 ES_{98}	—	January 31, 2008	Catalina	CSS	·	2.0 km	MPC · JPL
683839	2008 EM_{101}	—	March 5, 2008	Mount Lemmon	Mount Lemmon Survey	·	480 m	MPC · JPL
683840	2008 EO_{101}	—	March 5, 2008	Mount Lemmon	Mount Lemmon Survey	·	1.7 km	MPC · JPL
683841	2008 EK_{103}	—	March 5, 2008	Mount Lemmon	Mount Lemmon Survey	·	1.0 km	MPC · JPL
683842	2008 EV_{104}	—	March 6, 2008	Mount Lemmon	Mount Lemmon Survey	V	480 m	MPC · JPL
683843	2008 EQ_{105}	—	April 25, 2003	Kitt Peak	Spacewatch	·	1.6 km	MPC · JPL
683844	2008 EO_{106}	—	March 6, 2008	Mount Lemmon	Mount Lemmon Survey	·	830 m	MPC · JPL
683845	2008 EC_{107}	—	March 6, 2008	Mount Lemmon	Mount Lemmon Survey	·	1.4 km	MPC · JPL
683846	2008 EG_{107}	—	March 6, 2008	Mount Lemmon	Mount Lemmon Survey	·	660 m	MPC · JPL
683847	2008 EB_{112}	—	October 21, 2006	Mount Lemmon	Mount Lemmon Survey	·	1.5 km	MPC · JPL
683848	2008 EE_{112}	—	March 8, 2008	Mount Lemmon	Mount Lemmon Survey	T_{j} (2.97) · 3:2	3.8 km	MPC · JPL
683849	2008 EX_{112}	—	March 8, 2008	Kitt Peak	Spacewatch	·	1.0 km	MPC · JPL
683850	2008 EP_{113}	—	March 8, 2008	Mount Lemmon	Mount Lemmon Survey	·	580 m	MPC · JPL
683851	2008 EK_{124}	—	March 2, 2008	Kitt Peak	Spacewatch	·	1.7 km	MPC · JPL
683852	2008 EN_{125}	—	March 10, 2008	Mount Lemmon	Mount Lemmon Survey	DOR	2.1 km	MPC · JPL
683853	2008 EH_{129}	—	March 11, 2008	Kitt Peak	Spacewatch	HOF	2.5 km	MPC · JPL
683854	2008 EH_{130}	—	December 27, 2006	Mount Lemmon	Mount Lemmon Survey	KOR	1.3 km	MPC · JPL
683855	2008 EW_{131}	—	February 28, 2008	Kitt Peak	Spacewatch	AEO	1.0 km	MPC · JPL
683856	2008 EY_{132}	—	March 11, 2008	Mount Lemmon	Mount Lemmon Survey	·	1.7 km	MPC · JPL
683857	2008 EH_{133}	—	March 11, 2008	Mount Lemmon	Mount Lemmon Survey	·	1.7 km	MPC · JPL
683858	2008 EU_{135}	—	August 31, 2005	Kitt Peak	Spacewatch	·	1.0 km	MPC · JPL
683859	2008 EL_{142}	—	December 15, 2006	Kitt Peak	Spacewatch	·	1.5 km	MPC · JPL
683860	2008 ED_{143}	—	March 6, 2008	Mount Lemmon	Mount Lemmon Survey	EOS	1.4 km	MPC · JPL
683861	2008 EV_{143}	—	March 15, 2008	Mount Lemmon	Mount Lemmon Survey	·	1.9 km	MPC · JPL
683862	2008 EE_{144}	—	March 11, 2008	Kitt Peak	Spacewatch	·	750 m	MPC · JPL
683863	2008 EJ_{144}	—	August 27, 2005	Palomar	NEAT	MAS	770 m	MPC · JPL
683864	2008 EA_{146}	—	March 7, 2008	Mount Lemmon	Mount Lemmon Survey	·	1.2 km	MPC · JPL
683865	2008 EQ_{155}	—	January 18, 2016	Mount Lemmon	Mount Lemmon Survey	JUN	1.1 km	MPC · JPL
683866	2008 EO_{162}	—	March 13, 2008	Kitt Peak	Spacewatch	·	1.4 km	MPC · JPL
683867	2008 EP_{171}	—	October 6, 2005	Mount Lemmon	Mount Lemmon Survey	EOS	1.2 km	MPC · JPL
683868 Chrupała	2008 EK_{172}	Chrupała	August 31, 2013	Tincana	M. Kusiak, M. Żołnowski	·	1.3 km	MPC · JPL
683869	2008 EB_{173}	—	July 19, 2009	La Sagra	OAM	·	1.2 km	MPC · JPL
683870	2008 EH_{174}	—	December 21, 2014	Haleakala	Pan-STARRS 1	·	880 m	MPC · JPL
683871	2008 EG_{175}	—	October 20, 2016	Mount Lemmon	Mount Lemmon Survey	EOS	1.3 km	MPC · JPL
683872	2008 ET_{175}	—	November 30, 2011	Haleakala	Pan-STARRS 1	·	1.9 km	MPC · JPL
683873	2008 EF_{176}	—	December 13, 2010	Mount Lemmon	Mount Lemmon Survey	·	600 m	MPC · JPL
683874	2008 EO_{176}	—	February 5, 2013	Kitt Peak	Spacewatch	EOS	1.4 km	MPC · JPL
683875	2008 EW_{176}	—	October 8, 2016	Haleakala	Pan-STARRS 1	·	1.6 km	MPC · JPL
683876	2008 EO_{179}	—	February 17, 2013	Kitt Peak	Spacewatch	EOS	1.4 km	MPC · JPL
683877	2008 EQ_{180}	—	March 15, 2008	Mount Lemmon	Mount Lemmon Survey	·	440 m	MPC · JPL
683878	2008 EY_{180}	—	September 19, 2014	Haleakala	Pan-STARRS 1	·	2.0 km	MPC · JPL
683879	2008 EC_{181}	—	July 19, 2015	Haleakala	Pan-STARRS 1	EOS	1.4 km	MPC · JPL
683880	2008 EZ_{181}	—	March 5, 2008	Mount Lemmon	Mount Lemmon Survey	·	1.3 km	MPC · JPL
683881	2008 EB_{182}	—	September 11, 2015	Haleakala	Pan-STARRS 1	·	1.1 km	MPC · JPL
683882	2008 EL_{183}	—	May 26, 2014	Haleakala	Pan-STARRS 1	·	1.1 km	MPC · JPL
683883	2008 EP_{183}	—	December 23, 2012	Haleakala	Pan-STARRS 1	·	1.4 km	MPC · JPL
683884	2008 EU_{183}	—	November 23, 1997	Kitt Peak	Spacewatch	·	580 m	MPC · JPL
683885	2008 ED_{184}	—	November 22, 2017	Haleakala	Pan-STARRS 1	·	2.2 km	MPC · JPL
683886	2008 ER_{184}	—	April 30, 2014	Haleakala	Pan-STARRS 1	·	1.9 km	MPC · JPL
683887	2008 ES_{184}	—	February 7, 2011	Mount Lemmon	Mount Lemmon Survey	·	510 m	MPC · JPL
683888	2008 EX_{184}	—	March 5, 2011	Mount Lemmon	Mount Lemmon Survey	·	540 m	MPC · JPL
683889	2008 EN_{185}	—	September 20, 2011	Kitt Peak	Spacewatch	·	1.9 km	MPC · JPL
683890	2008 EG_{186}	—	July 12, 2015	Haleakala	Pan-STARRS 1	·	2.0 km	MPC · JPL
683891	2008 EN_{186}	—	June 27, 2015	Haleakala	Pan-STARRS 1	EOS	1.4 km	MPC · JPL
683892	2008 EQ_{187}	—	May 7, 2014	Haleakala	Pan-STARRS 1	·	2.2 km	MPC · JPL
683893	2008 ET_{187}	—	April 14, 2012	Haleakala	Pan-STARRS 1	·	690 m	MPC · JPL
683894	2008 EV_{188}	—	October 9, 2013	Kitt Peak	Spacewatch	3:2	3.8 km	MPC · JPL
683895	2008 ES_{189}	—	March 25, 2012	Mount Lemmon	Mount Lemmon Survey	·	780 m	MPC · JPL
683896	2008 EX_{189}	—	October 25, 2001	Apache Point	SDSS Collaboration	HOF	2.2 km	MPC · JPL
683897	2008 EA_{190}	—	March 11, 2008	Kitt Peak	Spacewatch	·	1.4 km	MPC · JPL
683898	2008 EW_{190}	—	March 8, 2008	Kitt Peak	Spacewatch	·	2.7 km	MPC · JPL
683899	2008 EN_{191}	—	March 2, 2008	Kitt Peak	Spacewatch	·	1.8 km	MPC · JPL
683900	2008 EX_{191}	—	March 1, 2008	Kitt Peak	Spacewatch	·	1.9 km	MPC · JPL

== 683901–684000 ==
back to top

Designation			Discovery			Properties		Ref
Permanent	Provisional	Named after	Date	Site	Discoverer(s)	Category	Diam.	Ref
683901	2008 EC_{192}	—	March 1, 2008	Mount Lemmon	Mount Lemmon Survey	·	1.3 km	MPC · JPL
683902	2008 ES_{192}	—	March 6, 2008	Mount Lemmon	Mount Lemmon Survey	EOS	1.6 km	MPC · JPL
683903	2008 EZ_{192}	—	March 6, 2008	Mount Lemmon	Mount Lemmon Survey	·	1.2 km	MPC · JPL
683904	2008 EE_{193}	—	March 15, 2008	Kitt Peak	Spacewatch	·	1.4 km	MPC · JPL
683905	2008 EV_{194}	—	March 15, 2008	Mount Lemmon	Mount Lemmon Survey	JUN	730 m	MPC · JPL
683906	2008 EM_{196}	—	March 10, 2008	Kitt Peak	Spacewatch	NEM	1.7 km	MPC · JPL
683907	2008 ER_{197}	—	March 12, 2008	Kitt Peak	Spacewatch	·	1.7 km	MPC · JPL
683908	2008 ET_{197}	—	March 11, 2008	Kitt Peak	Spacewatch	·	2.0 km	MPC · JPL
683909	2008 FZ_{1}	—	March 25, 2008	Kitt Peak	Spacewatch	·	1.2 km	MPC · JPL
683910	2008 FY_{12}	—	March 26, 2008	Mount Lemmon	Mount Lemmon Survey	·	1.3 km	MPC · JPL
683911	2008 FF_{13}	—	March 26, 2008	Mount Lemmon	Mount Lemmon Survey	·	1.8 km	MPC · JPL
683912	2008 FC_{21}	—	March 27, 2008	Kitt Peak	Spacewatch	·	1.5 km	MPC · JPL
683913	2008 FZ_{22}	—	March 27, 2008	Kitt Peak	Spacewatch	·	1.3 km	MPC · JPL
683914	2008 FX_{24}	—	March 27, 2008	Kitt Peak	Spacewatch	·	1.6 km	MPC · JPL
683915	2008 FF_{25}	—	March 5, 2008	Kitt Peak	Spacewatch	·	1.6 km	MPC · JPL
683916	2008 FH_{31}	—	March 5, 2008	Mount Lemmon	Mount Lemmon Survey	·	1.4 km	MPC · JPL
683917	2008 FQ_{33}	—	March 27, 2003	Palomar	NEAT	·	1.7 km	MPC · JPL
683918	2008 FF_{34}	—	March 28, 2008	Mount Lemmon	Mount Lemmon Survey	·	1.4 km	MPC · JPL
683919	2008 FR_{38}	—	March 10, 2008	Kitt Peak	Spacewatch	·	1.8 km	MPC · JPL
683920	2008 FX_{38}	—	March 10, 2008	Kitt Peak	Spacewatch	·	520 m	MPC · JPL
683921	2008 FX_{44}	—	March 28, 2008	Mount Lemmon	Mount Lemmon Survey	EOS	1.3 km	MPC · JPL
683922	2008 FD_{45}	—	March 28, 2008	Mount Lemmon	Mount Lemmon Survey	NYS	940 m	MPC · JPL
683923	2008 FB_{48}	—	March 28, 2008	Mount Lemmon	Mount Lemmon Survey	·	2.0 km	MPC · JPL
683924	2008 FM_{49}	—	March 12, 2008	Kitt Peak	Spacewatch	HOF	2.2 km	MPC · JPL
683925	2008 FT_{53}	—	March 13, 2008	Kitt Peak	Spacewatch	·	1.5 km	MPC · JPL
683926	2008 FB_{63}	—	March 27, 2008	Kitt Peak	Spacewatch	·	1.8 km	MPC · JPL
683927	2008 FD_{74}	—	March 31, 2008	Kitt Peak	Spacewatch	·	1.8 km	MPC · JPL
683928	2008 FQ_{74}	—	March 31, 2008	Mount Lemmon	Mount Lemmon Survey	·	2.3 km	MPC · JPL
683929	2008 FS_{74}	—	November 22, 2006	Mount Lemmon	Mount Lemmon Survey	·	1.7 km	MPC · JPL
683930	2008 FB_{78}	—	March 10, 2008	Kitt Peak	Spacewatch	KOR	1.3 km	MPC · JPL
683931	2008 FX_{78}	—	July 31, 2000	Cerro Tololo	Deep Ecliptic Survey	AGN	1.1 km	MPC · JPL
683932	2008 FU_{79}	—	March 5, 2008	Kitt Peak	Spacewatch	·	2.2 km	MPC · JPL
683933	2008 FL_{80}	—	March 15, 2008	Mount Lemmon	Mount Lemmon Survey	·	1.5 km	MPC · JPL
683934	2008 FG_{81}	—	March 27, 2008	Mount Lemmon	Mount Lemmon Survey	·	710 m	MPC · JPL
683935	2008 FQ_{81}	—	March 27, 2008	Mount Lemmon	Mount Lemmon Survey	·	1.8 km	MPC · JPL
683936	2008 FT_{90}	—	October 12, 2006	Kitt Peak	Spacewatch	KOR	1.3 km	MPC · JPL
683937	2008 FR_{91}	—	November 24, 2006	Kitt Peak	Spacewatch	·	1.7 km	MPC · JPL
683938	2008 FJ_{103}	—	March 30, 2008	Kitt Peak	Spacewatch	AGN	1.1 km	MPC · JPL
683939	2008 FU_{108}	—	March 31, 2008	Mount Lemmon	Mount Lemmon Survey	KOR	1.0 km	MPC · JPL
683940	2008 FK_{109}	—	March 31, 2008	Mount Lemmon	Mount Lemmon Survey	·	1.2 km	MPC · JPL
683941	2008 FS_{118}	—	March 8, 2008	Kitt Peak	Spacewatch	·	550 m	MPC · JPL
683942	2008 FT_{118}	—	March 31, 2008	Mount Lemmon	Mount Lemmon Survey	·	1.4 km	MPC · JPL
683943	2008 FJ_{119}	—	March 31, 2008	Mount Lemmon	Mount Lemmon Survey	·	1 km	MPC · JPL
683944	2008 FM_{133}	—	March 27, 2008	Kitt Peak	Spacewatch	·	1.7 km	MPC · JPL
683945	2008 FR_{133}	—	March 28, 2008	Mount Lemmon	Mount Lemmon Survey	AGN	980 m	MPC · JPL
683946	2008 FZ_{135}	—	March 31, 2008	Mount Lemmon	Mount Lemmon Survey	·	2.4 km	MPC · JPL
683947	2008 FD_{140}	—	January 14, 2002	Kitt Peak	Spacewatch	·	1.7 km	MPC · JPL
683948	2008 FS_{141}	—	March 23, 2013	Mount Lemmon	Mount Lemmon Survey	·	1.5 km	MPC · JPL
683949	2008 FA_{142}	—	October 13, 2010	Catalina	CSS	EOS	1.8 km	MPC · JPL
683950	2008 FU_{142}	—	October 9, 2010	Mount Lemmon	Mount Lemmon Survey	·	1.4 km	MPC · JPL
683951	2008 FW_{143}	—	September 19, 2010	Kitt Peak	Spacewatch	KOR	1.1 km	MPC · JPL
683952	2008 FX_{143}	—	March 30, 2008	Kitt Peak	Spacewatch	EOS	1.5 km	MPC · JPL
683953	2008 FE_{144}	—	March 28, 2008	Mount Lemmon	Mount Lemmon Survey	·	1.6 km	MPC · JPL
683954	2008 FQ_{145}	—	March 28, 2008	Mount Lemmon	Mount Lemmon Survey	·	1.3 km	MPC · JPL
683955	2008 FH_{148}	—	March 28, 2008	Mount Lemmon	Mount Lemmon Survey	3:2	3.3 km	MPC · JPL
683956	2008 FZ_{148}	—	March 27, 2008	Mount Lemmon	Mount Lemmon Survey	·	1.9 km	MPC · JPL
683957	2008 FA_{149}	—	March 27, 2008	Mount Lemmon	Mount Lemmon Survey	·	1.8 km	MPC · JPL
683958	2008 FN_{149}	—	March 31, 2008	Mount Lemmon	Mount Lemmon Survey	EOS	1.3 km	MPC · JPL
683959	2008 FB_{150}	—	March 31, 2008	Mount Lemmon	Mount Lemmon Survey	·	1.5 km	MPC · JPL
683960	2008 FD_{150}	—	March 28, 2008	Mount Lemmon	Mount Lemmon Survey	·	1.8 km	MPC · JPL
683961	2008 GH_{13}	—	March 27, 2008	Mount Lemmon	Mount Lemmon Survey	·	1.5 km	MPC · JPL
683962	2008 GC_{14}	—	April 3, 2008	Mount Lemmon	Mount Lemmon Survey	THM	1.7 km	MPC · JPL
683963	2008 GN_{15}	—	April 3, 2008	Mount Lemmon	Mount Lemmon Survey	H	310 m	MPC · JPL
683964	2008 GH_{22}	—	April 1, 2008	Mount Lemmon	Mount Lemmon Survey	·	730 m	MPC · JPL
683965	2008 GP_{22}	—	March 4, 2008	Mount Lemmon	Mount Lemmon Survey	GEF	1.2 km	MPC · JPL
683966	2008 GF_{23}	—	April 1, 2008	Mount Lemmon	Mount Lemmon Survey	·	2.0 km	MPC · JPL
683967	2008 GE_{28}	—	April 3, 2008	Kitt Peak	Spacewatch	EOS	1.4 km	MPC · JPL
683968	2008 GS_{29}	—	March 27, 2008	Mount Lemmon	Mount Lemmon Survey	EOS	1.4 km	MPC · JPL
683969	2008 GW_{30}	—	March 11, 2008	Kitt Peak	Spacewatch	EOS	1.3 km	MPC · JPL
683970	2008 GA_{39}	—	April 3, 2008	Kitt Peak	Spacewatch	·	2.3 km	MPC · JPL
683971	2008 GV_{39}	—	April 4, 2008	Kitt Peak	Spacewatch	·	1.7 km	MPC · JPL
683972	2008 GE_{45}	—	March 11, 2007	Mount Lemmon	Mount Lemmon Survey	L5	6.6 km	MPC · JPL
683973	2008 GY_{45}	—	April 4, 2008	Kitt Peak	Spacewatch	·	2.2 km	MPC · JPL
683974	2008 GS_{47}	—	April 4, 2008	Kitt Peak	Spacewatch	·	1.6 km	MPC · JPL
683975	2008 GP_{53}	—	April 5, 2008	Mount Lemmon	Mount Lemmon Survey	·	510 m	MPC · JPL
683976	2008 GO_{55}	—	April 5, 2008	Mount Lemmon	Mount Lemmon Survey	THM	1.6 km	MPC · JPL
683977	2008 GQ_{55}	—	April 5, 2008	Mount Lemmon	Mount Lemmon Survey	·	1.4 km	MPC · JPL
683978	2008 GV_{56}	—	December 26, 2006	Kitt Peak	Spacewatch	·	1.5 km	MPC · JPL
683979	2008 GD_{58}	—	April 5, 2008	Mount Lemmon	Mount Lemmon Survey	·	2.2 km	MPC · JPL
683980	2008 GN_{58}	—	April 5, 2008	Mount Lemmon	Mount Lemmon Survey	EOS	1.5 km	MPC · JPL
683981	2008 GO_{58}	—	March 12, 2008	Mount Lemmon	Mount Lemmon Survey	3:2	3.3 km	MPC · JPL
683982	2008 GZ_{58}	—	March 28, 2008	Mount Lemmon	Mount Lemmon Survey	·	1.6 km	MPC · JPL
683983	2008 GG_{62}	—	April 5, 2008	Mount Lemmon	Mount Lemmon Survey	EOS	1.5 km	MPC · JPL
683984	2008 GU_{71}	—	April 7, 2008	Kitt Peak	Spacewatch	·	1.2 km	MPC · JPL
683985	2008 GM_{75}	—	March 30, 2008	Kitt Peak	Spacewatch	EOS	1.4 km	MPC · JPL
683986	2008 GE_{76}	—	April 7, 2008	Mount Lemmon	Mount Lemmon Survey	·	1.4 km	MPC · JPL
683987	2008 GS_{77}	—	April 3, 2008	Kitt Peak	Spacewatch	·	870 m	MPC · JPL
683988	2008 GY_{78}	—	October 1, 2005	Kitt Peak	Spacewatch	·	2.2 km	MPC · JPL
683989	2008 GN_{84}	—	March 30, 2008	Kitt Peak	Spacewatch	·	730 m	MPC · JPL
683990	2008 GT_{84}	—	April 8, 2008	Mount Lemmon	Mount Lemmon Survey	·	1.4 km	MPC · JPL
683991	2008 GB_{87}	—	March 2, 2008	Mount Lemmon	Mount Lemmon Survey	H	330 m	MPC · JPL
683992	2008 GA_{92}	—	April 6, 2008	Mount Lemmon	Mount Lemmon Survey	·	1.6 km	MPC · JPL
683993	2008 GW_{94}	—	October 2, 2006	Mount Lemmon	Mount Lemmon Survey	·	800 m	MPC · JPL
683994	2008 GB_{96}	—	April 8, 2008	Kitt Peak	Spacewatch	V	600 m	MPC · JPL
683995	2008 GH_{99}	—	April 9, 2008	Kitt Peak	Spacewatch	·	1.6 km	MPC · JPL
683996	2008 GG_{103}	—	March 13, 2008	Kitt Peak	Spacewatch	H	420 m	MPC · JPL
683997	2008 GQ_{103}	—	April 11, 2008	Kitt Peak	Spacewatch	·	1.6 km	MPC · JPL
683998	2008 GJ_{104}	—	April 3, 2008	Kitt Peak	Spacewatch	·	1.6 km	MPC · JPL
683999	2008 GK_{116}	—	March 11, 2008	Kitt Peak	Spacewatch	·	2.0 km	MPC · JPL
684000	2008 GO_{117}	—	March 30, 2008	Kitt Peak	Spacewatch	·	1.7 km	MPC · JPL

back to top

== Meaning of names ==
As minor planet discoveries are confirmed, they are given a permanent number by the IAU's Minor Planet Center (MPC), and the discoverers can then submit names for them, following the IAU's naming conventions. The list below concerns those minor planets in the specified number-range that have received names, and explains the meanings of those names.

Official naming citations of newly named small Solar System bodies are approved and published in a bulletin by IAU's Working Group for Small Bodies Nomenclature (WGSBN). Before May 2021, citations were published in MPC's Minor Planet Circulars for many decades. Recent citations can also be found on the JPL Small-Body Database (SBDB). Until his death in 2016, German astronomer Lutz D. Schmadel compiled these citations into the Dictionary of Minor Planet Names (DMP) and regularly updated the collection.

Based on Paul Herget's The Names of the Minor Planets, Schmadel also researched the unclear origin of numerous asteroids, most of which had been named prior to World War II. This article incorporates text from this source, which is in the public domain: SBDB New namings may only be added to this list below after official publication as the preannouncement of names is condemned. The WGSBN publishes a comprehensive guideline for the naming rules of non-cometary small Solar System bodies.

Named minor planet	Provisional	This minor planet was named for...	Ref · Catalog
683868 Chrupała	2008 EK_{172}	Henryk Chrupała, Polish astronomer, physicist, and astronomy popularizer.	IAU · 683868
