= List of minor planets: 657001–658000 =

The following is a partial list of minor planets, running from minor-planet number 657001 through 658000, inclusive. The primary data for this and other partial lists is based on JPL's "Small-Body Orbital Elements" and data available from the Minor Planet Center. Critical list information is also provided by the MPC, unless otherwise specified from Lowell Observatory. A detailed description of the table's columns and additional sources are given on the main page including a complete list of every page in this series, and a statistical break-up on the dynamical classification of minor planets.

Also see the summary list of all named bodies in numerical and alphabetical order, and the corresponding naming citations for the number range of this particular list. New namings may only be added to this list after official publication, as the preannouncement of names is condemned by the Working Group for Small Bodies Nomenclature of the International Astronomical Union.

Near-Earth obj.	MBA (inner)	MBA (outer)	Centaur
Mars-crosser	MBA (middle)	Jupiter trojan	Trans-Neptunian obj.
Unclassified

== 657001–657100 ==
Designation			Discovery			Properties		Ref
Permanent	Provisional	Named after	Date	Site	Discoverer(s)	Category	Diam.	Ref
657001	2016 GF_{36}	—	November 26, 2014	Mount Lemmon	Mount Lemmon Survey	GEF	760 m	MPC · JPL
657002	2016 GK_{36}	—	January 30, 2006	Kitt Peak	Spacewatch	KOR	1.0 km	MPC · JPL
657003	2016 GF_{38}	—	October 28, 2005	Mount Lemmon	Mount Lemmon Survey	·	1.2 km	MPC · JPL
657004	2016 GJ_{38}	—	December 24, 2014	Mount Lemmon	Mount Lemmon Survey	·	1.4 km	MPC · JPL
657005	2016 GT_{38}	—	September 6, 2008	Mount Lemmon	Mount Lemmon Survey	KOR	1.0 km	MPC · JPL
657006	2016 GW_{39}	—	October 21, 2014	Mount Lemmon	Mount Lemmon Survey	(5)	860 m	MPC · JPL
657007	2016 GC_{45}	—	October 23, 2009	Mount Lemmon	Mount Lemmon Survey	·	1.3 km	MPC · JPL
657008	2016 GC_{47}	—	September 15, 2013	Kitt Peak	Spacewatch	KOR	1.2 km	MPC · JPL
657009	2016 GP_{49}	—	September 1, 2013	Haleakala	Pan-STARRS 1	WIT	730 m	MPC · JPL
657010	2016 GN_{53}	—	August 4, 2008	Siding Spring	SSS	·	1.8 km	MPC · JPL
657011	2016 GC_{54}	—	April 1, 2016	Haleakala	Pan-STARRS 1	·	1.6 km	MPC · JPL
657012	2016 GP_{57}	—	August 12, 2013	Haleakala	Pan-STARRS 1	·	910 m	MPC · JPL
657013	2016 GR_{63}	—	September 13, 2013	Kitt Peak	Spacewatch	·	1.5 km	MPC · JPL
657014	2016 GK_{64}	—	April 22, 2007	Kitt Peak	Spacewatch	·	1.6 km	MPC · JPL
657015	2016 GC_{65}	—	October 11, 2005	Kitt Peak	Spacewatch	·	1.3 km	MPC · JPL
657016	2016 GY_{68}	—	November 20, 2014	Haleakala	Pan-STARRS 1	·	1.0 km	MPC · JPL
657017	2016 GO_{69}	—	September 14, 2007	Mount Lemmon	Mount Lemmon Survey	·	600 m	MPC · JPL
657018	2016 GB_{70}	—	April 1, 2016	Haleakala	Pan-STARRS 1	MRX	730 m	MPC · JPL
657019	2016 GY_{72}	—	September 3, 2013	Calar Alto	F. Hormuth	·	1.4 km	MPC · JPL
657020	2016 GR_{74}	—	December 29, 2014	Mount Lemmon	Mount Lemmon Survey	·	1.2 km	MPC · JPL
657021	2016 GB_{75}	—	November 26, 2014	Haleakala	Pan-STARRS 1	·	1.6 km	MPC · JPL
657022	2016 GX_{76}	—	November 17, 2009	Kitt Peak	Spacewatch	HOF	1.9 km	MPC · JPL
657023	2016 GE_{84}	—	January 14, 2015	Haleakala	Pan-STARRS 1	KOR	1.1 km	MPC · JPL
657024	2016 GK_{84}	—	November 4, 2005	Mount Lemmon	Mount Lemmon Survey	·	1.5 km	MPC · JPL
657025	2016 GK_{85}	—	April 1, 2016	Mount Lemmon	Mount Lemmon Survey	AGN	980 m	MPC · JPL
657026	2016 GC_{95}	—	May 28, 2008	Kitt Peak	Spacewatch	·	1.1 km	MPC · JPL
657027	2016 GR_{95}	—	February 11, 2016	Haleakala	Pan-STARRS 1	·	1.8 km	MPC · JPL
657028	2016 GQ_{96}	—	February 4, 2006	Kitt Peak	Spacewatch	·	1.6 km	MPC · JPL
657029	2016 GA_{102}	—	March 27, 2011	Mount Lemmon	Mount Lemmon Survey	·	1.6 km	MPC · JPL
657030	2016 GY_{104}	—	September 27, 2003	Kitt Peak	Spacewatch	BRA	1.2 km	MPC · JPL
657031	2016 GC_{105}	—	January 16, 2007	Mount Lemmon	Mount Lemmon Survey	·	1.0 km	MPC · JPL
657032	2016 GF_{107}	—	October 9, 2007	Mount Lemmon	Mount Lemmon Survey	·	1.7 km	MPC · JPL
657033	2016 GA_{110}	—	April 1, 2016	Haleakala	Pan-STARRS 1	HOF	2.2 km	MPC · JPL
657034	2016 GS_{110}	—	April 1, 2016	Haleakala	Pan-STARRS 1	AGN	830 m	MPC · JPL
657035	2016 GA_{111}	—	November 17, 2014	Mount Lemmon	Mount Lemmon Survey	MIS	2.0 km	MPC · JPL
657036	2016 GG_{120}	—	December 21, 2014	Haleakala	Pan-STARRS 1	HOF	2.0 km	MPC · JPL
657037	2016 GS_{122}	—	April 1, 2016	Haleakala	Pan-STARRS 1	KOR	1.2 km	MPC · JPL
657038	2016 GH_{128}	—	May 15, 2012	Haleakala	Pan-STARRS 1	·	1.4 km	MPC · JPL
657039	2016 GQ_{128}	—	September 15, 2004	Kitt Peak	Spacewatch	PAD	1.1 km	MPC · JPL
657040	2016 GS_{131}	—	November 29, 2014	Mount Lemmon	Mount Lemmon Survey	·	1.2 km	MPC · JPL
657041	2016 GB_{134}	—	November 17, 2014	Haleakala	Pan-STARRS 1	·	810 m	MPC · JPL
657042	2016 GM_{138}	—	January 23, 2006	Kitt Peak	Spacewatch	HOF	2.2 km	MPC · JPL
657043	2016 GW_{144}	—	December 15, 2006	Kitt Peak	Spacewatch	·	1.6 km	MPC · JPL
657044	2016 GF_{146}	—	July 14, 2013	Haleakala	Pan-STARRS 1	AGN	820 m	MPC · JPL
657045	2016 GM_{148}	—	April 22, 2007	Kitt Peak	Spacewatch	NEM	2.4 km	MPC · JPL
657046	2016 GE_{149}	—	October 8, 2007	Mount Lemmon	Mount Lemmon Survey	·	800 m	MPC · JPL
657047	2016 GY_{149}	—	November 20, 2014	Haleakala	Pan-STARRS 1	·	1.1 km	MPC · JPL
657048	2016 GJ_{151}	—	September 2, 2013	Mount Lemmon	Mount Lemmon Survey	·	1.4 km	MPC · JPL
657049	2016 GE_{153}	—	March 28, 2012	Kitt Peak	Spacewatch	·	1.2 km	MPC · JPL
657050	2016 GC_{154}	—	February 9, 2016	Haleakala	Pan-STARRS 1	·	820 m	MPC · JPL
657051	2016 GH_{154}	—	September 28, 2006	Mount Lemmon	Mount Lemmon Survey	·	1.0 km	MPC · JPL
657052	2016 GW_{161}	—	April 11, 2008	Kitt Peak	Spacewatch	·	1.4 km	MPC · JPL
657053	2016 GY_{163}	—	February 4, 2013	Mayhill-ISON	L. Elenin	H	510 m	MPC · JPL
657054	2016 GF_{164}	—	March 14, 2016	Mount Lemmon	Mount Lemmon Survey	·	1.4 km	MPC · JPL
657055	2016 GV_{164}	—	September 19, 2008	Kitt Peak	Spacewatch	·	1.7 km	MPC · JPL
657056	2016 GZ_{165}	—	February 10, 2011	Mount Lemmon	Mount Lemmon Survey	·	1.2 km	MPC · JPL
657057	2016 GB_{169}	—	February 11, 2016	Haleakala	Pan-STARRS 1	·	1.1 km	MPC · JPL
657058	2016 GH_{169}	—	September 28, 2013	Mount Lemmon	Mount Lemmon Survey	·	1.3 km	MPC · JPL
657059	2016 GS_{169}	—	December 21, 2014	Haleakala	Pan-STARRS 1	·	1.6 km	MPC · JPL
657060	2016 GO_{171}	—	April 3, 2016	Haleakala	Pan-STARRS 1	MRX	790 m	MPC · JPL
657061	2016 GD_{177}	—	January 27, 2007	Kitt Peak	Spacewatch	·	1.1 km	MPC · JPL
657062	2016 GO_{178}	—	October 26, 2005	Kitt Peak	Spacewatch	HNS	820 m	MPC · JPL
657063	2016 GZ_{179}	—	February 3, 2011	Piszkés-tető	K. Sárneczky, Z. Kuli	·	1.5 km	MPC · JPL
657064	2016 GP_{183}	—	October 27, 2005	Mount Lemmon	Mount Lemmon Survey	HNS	1.2 km	MPC · JPL
657065	2016 GZ_{185}	—	November 4, 2005	Kitt Peak	Spacewatch	·	1.7 km	MPC · JPL
657066	2016 GZ_{187}	—	February 18, 2014	Mount Lemmon	Mount Lemmon Survey	L4	6.8 km	MPC · JPL
657067	2016 GE_{191}	—	June 10, 2013	Mount Lemmon	Mount Lemmon Survey	·	610 m	MPC · JPL
657068	2016 GT_{198}	—	January 30, 2011	Mount Lemmon	Mount Lemmon Survey	·	1.8 km	MPC · JPL
657069	2016 GK_{199}	—	August 31, 2005	Palomar	NEAT	·	1.7 km	MPC · JPL
657070	2016 GR_{199}	—	March 30, 2016	Haleakala	Pan-STARRS 1	·	930 m	MPC · JPL
657071	2016 GL_{200}	—	September 17, 2009	Kitt Peak	Spacewatch	WIT	740 m	MPC · JPL
657072	2016 GS_{202}	—	November 26, 2014	Haleakala	Pan-STARRS 1	·	1.5 km	MPC · JPL
657073	2016 GR_{207}	—	November 6, 2010	Mount Lemmon	Mount Lemmon Survey	(5)	910 m	MPC · JPL
657074	2016 GL_{210}	—	January 2, 2011	Mount Lemmon	Mount Lemmon Survey	·	1.1 km	MPC · JPL
657075	2016 GR_{212}	—	September 15, 2007	Mount Lemmon	Mount Lemmon Survey	·	710 m	MPC · JPL
657076	2016 GT_{212}	—	September 8, 2008	Kitt Peak	Spacewatch	·	1.5 km	MPC · JPL
657077	2016 GH_{215}	—	February 6, 2002	Kitt Peak	Deep Ecliptic Survey	L4	7.5 km	MPC · JPL
657078	2016 GW_{217}	—	April 16, 2004	Palomar	NEAT	·	1.2 km	MPC · JPL
657079	2016 GY_{217}	—	March 27, 2012	Mount Lemmon	Mount Lemmon Survey	EUN	1.2 km	MPC · JPL
657080	2016 GA_{218}	—	February 13, 2013	Haleakala	Pan-STARRS 1	·	770 m	MPC · JPL
657081	2016 GT_{219}	—	April 11, 2016	Haleakala	Pan-STARRS 1	BRA	1.2 km	MPC · JPL
657082	2016 GW_{219}	—	September 22, 2008	Goodricke-Pigott	R. A. Tucker	·	1.4 km	MPC · JPL
657083	2016 GF_{220}	—	February 20, 2015	Haleakala	Pan-STARRS 1	·	2.3 km	MPC · JPL
657084	2016 GT_{220}	—	February 12, 2016	Haleakala	Pan-STARRS 1	APO +1km · PHA	970 m	MPC · JPL
657085	2016 GN_{223}	—	October 13, 2010	Mount Lemmon	Mount Lemmon Survey	·	960 m	MPC · JPL
657086	2016 GU_{225}	—	February 23, 2007	Mount Lemmon	Mount Lemmon Survey	·	1.5 km	MPC · JPL
657087	2016 GC_{226}	—	April 2, 2002	Kitt Peak	Spacewatch	·	1.9 km	MPC · JPL
657088	2016 GG_{229}	—	February 25, 2007	Mount Lemmon	Mount Lemmon Survey	·	1.3 km	MPC · JPL
657089	2016 GJ_{232}	—	November 3, 2008	Mount Lemmon	Mount Lemmon Survey	BRA	1.3 km	MPC · JPL
657090	2016 GO_{234}	—	April 14, 2016	Haleakala	Pan-STARRS 1	·	1.8 km	MPC · JPL
657091	2016 GK_{244}	—	September 11, 2007	Mount Lemmon	Mount Lemmon Survey	·	800 m	MPC · JPL
657092	2016 GH_{247}	—	October 20, 2014	Mount Lemmon	Mount Lemmon Survey	·	1.0 km	MPC · JPL
657093	2016 GS_{247}	—	March 13, 2016	Haleakala	Pan-STARRS 1	AGN	920 m	MPC · JPL
657094	2016 GW_{249}	—	February 21, 2007	Mount Lemmon	Mount Lemmon Survey	·	1.3 km	MPC · JPL
657095	2016 GZ_{250}	—	October 2, 2013	Haleakala	Pan-STARRS 1	·	1.7 km	MPC · JPL
657096	2016 GO_{251}	—	January 13, 2015	Haleakala	Pan-STARRS 1	·	810 m	MPC · JPL
657097	2016 GK_{253}	—	April 2, 2016	Haleakala	Pan-STARRS 1	·	1.1 km	MPC · JPL
657098	2016 GV_{254}	—	October 25, 2008	Kitt Peak	Spacewatch	·	1.8 km	MPC · JPL
657099	2016 GJ_{256}	—	April 11, 2016	Haleakala	Pan-STARRS 1	EUN	820 m	MPC · JPL
657100	2016 GN_{256}	—	April 11, 2016	Haleakala	Pan-STARRS 1	·	1.8 km	MPC · JPL

== 657101–657200 ==
back to top

Designation			Discovery			Properties		Ref
Permanent	Provisional	Named after	Date	Site	Discoverer(s)	Category	Diam.	Ref
657101	2016 GD_{258}	—	April 1, 2016	Haleakala	Pan-STARRS 1	·	1.3 km	MPC · JPL
657102	2016 GJ_{258}	—	October 25, 2013	Mount Lemmon	Mount Lemmon Survey	·	1.6 km	MPC · JPL
657103	2016 GO_{258}	—	October 3, 2013	Haleakala	Pan-STARRS 1	·	1.4 km	MPC · JPL
657104	2016 GQ_{258}	—	February 26, 2011	Mount Lemmon	Mount Lemmon Survey	·	1.3 km	MPC · JPL
657105	2016 GS_{260}	—	January 27, 2007	Kitt Peak	Spacewatch	·	920 m	MPC · JPL
657106	2016 GV_{260}	—	October 28, 2005	Mount Lemmon	Mount Lemmon Survey	·	1.3 km	MPC · JPL
657107	2016 GW_{260}	—	February 19, 2002	Kitt Peak	Spacewatch	·	1.6 km	MPC · JPL
657108	2016 GC_{262}	—	December 14, 2010	Mount Lemmon	Mount Lemmon Survey	·	910 m	MPC · JPL
657109	2016 GE_{265}	—	February 13, 2011	Mount Lemmon	Mount Lemmon Survey	·	1.2 km	MPC · JPL
657110	2016 GO_{267}	—	November 14, 2012	Kitt Peak	Spacewatch	·	1.8 km	MPC · JPL
657111	2016 GK_{268}	—	April 1, 2016	Haleakala	Pan-STARRS 1	·	1.5 km	MPC · JPL
657112	2016 GP_{268}	—	April 11, 2016	Haleakala	Pan-STARRS 1	·	2.4 km	MPC · JPL
657113	2016 GS_{268}	—	September 8, 1996	Kitt Peak	Spacewatch	·	1.3 km	MPC · JPL
657114	2016 GN_{278}	—	April 5, 2016	Haleakala	Pan-STARRS 1	L4	6.5 km	MPC · JPL
657115	2016 GO_{278}	—	April 3, 2016	Haleakala	Pan-STARRS 1	·	1.4 km	MPC · JPL
657116	2016 GP_{278}	—	April 3, 2016	Mount Lemmon	Mount Lemmon Survey	HOF	2.0 km	MPC · JPL
657117	2016 GT_{278}	—	April 5, 2016	Haleakala	Pan-STARRS 1	·	1.3 km	MPC · JPL
657118	2016 GR_{279}	—	April 1, 2016	Haleakala	Pan-STARRS 1	·	1.4 km	MPC · JPL
657119	2016 GQ_{285}	—	April 4, 2016	Haleakala	Pan-STARRS 1	·	1.4 km	MPC · JPL
657120	2016 GH_{288}	—	April 12, 2016	Haleakala	Pan-STARRS 1	·	1.2 km	MPC · JPL
657121	2016 GW_{290}	—	April 3, 2016	Haleakala	Pan-STARRS 1	·	1.1 km	MPC · JPL
657122	2016 GZ_{290}	—	April 5, 2016	Haleakala	Pan-STARRS 1	·	1.2 km	MPC · JPL
657123	2016 GB_{292}	—	April 2, 2016	Mount Lemmon	Mount Lemmon Survey	·	1.7 km	MPC · JPL
657124	2016 GF_{298}	—	April 13, 2016	Mount Lemmon	Mount Lemmon Survey	·	1.6 km	MPC · JPL
657125	2016 GW_{302}	—	April 4, 2016	Mount Lemmon	Mount Lemmon Survey	·	1.5 km	MPC · JPL
657126	2016 GB_{319}	—	April 2, 2016	Haleakala	Pan-STARRS 1	·	1.0 km	MPC · JPL
657127	2016 GS_{319}	—	April 2, 2016	Haleakala	Pan-STARRS 1	·	1.5 km	MPC · JPL
657128	2016 GH_{323}	—	April 12, 2016	Haleakala	Pan-STARRS 1	KOR	1.1 km	MPC · JPL
657129	2016 GB_{325}	—	April 1, 2016	Haleakala	Pan-STARRS 1	·	1.4 km	MPC · JPL
657130	2016 GN_{341}	—	April 15, 2016	Haleakala	Pan-STARRS 1	·	2.4 km	MPC · JPL
657131	2016 HW_{1}	—	January 14, 2011	Mount Lemmon	Mount Lemmon Survey	(1547)	1.2 km	MPC · JPL
657132	2016 HW_{2}	—	September 6, 2013	Črni Vrh	Mikuž, H.	PHO	810 m	MPC · JPL
657133	2016 HD_{4}	—	March 24, 2012	Catalina	CSS	·	1.8 km	MPC · JPL
657134	2016 HB_{6}	—	November 14, 2006	Kitt Peak	Spacewatch	·	970 m	MPC · JPL
657135	2016 HW_{7}	—	April 11, 2007	Kitt Peak	Spacewatch	·	1.3 km	MPC · JPL
657136	2016 HE_{8}	—	November 28, 2014	Haleakala	Pan-STARRS 1	MAR	1.2 km	MPC · JPL
657137	2016 HM_{12}	—	April 5, 2016	Haleakala	Pan-STARRS 1	·	840 m	MPC · JPL
657138	2016 HQ_{12}	—	November 8, 2004	Bergisch Gladbach	W. Bickel	HOF	2.8 km	MPC · JPL
657139	2016 HC_{17}	—	October 29, 2005	Kitt Peak	Spacewatch	·	1.2 km	MPC · JPL
657140	2016 HQ_{18}	—	April 5, 2016	Haleakala	Pan-STARRS 1	(5)	830 m	MPC · JPL
657141	2016 HA_{19}	—	January 19, 2015	Haleakala	Pan-STARRS 1	·	1.4 km	MPC · JPL
657142	2016 HN_{23}	—	October 9, 2004	Socorro	LINEAR	·	420 m	MPC · JPL
657143	2016 HA_{24}	—	April 17, 2016	Mount Lemmon	Mount Lemmon Survey	H	490 m	MPC · JPL
657144	2016 HE_{25}	—	November 12, 2001	Apache Point	SDSS Collaboration	·	2.3 km	MPC · JPL
657145	2016 HS_{28}	—	April 16, 2016	Haleakala	Pan-STARRS 1	·	1.4 km	MPC · JPL
657146	2016 HU_{32}	—	April 30, 2016	Haleakala	Pan-STARRS 1	·	1.6 km	MPC · JPL
657147	2016 HO_{37}	—	April 30, 2016	Haleakala	Pan-STARRS 1	KOR	930 m	MPC · JPL
657148	2016 JV_{3}	—	November 3, 2007	Mount Lemmon	Mount Lemmon Survey	·	470 m	MPC · JPL
657149	2016 JF_{7}	—	November 20, 2009	Mount Lemmon	Mount Lemmon Survey	·	1.9 km	MPC · JPL
657150	2016 JM_{8}	—	December 19, 2009	Mount Lemmon	Mount Lemmon Survey	·	2.0 km	MPC · JPL
657151	2016 JX_{13}	—	March 6, 2011	Mount Lemmon	Mount Lemmon Survey	EUN	960 m	MPC · JPL
657152	2016 JX_{18}	—	November 30, 2005	Mount Lemmon	Mount Lemmon Survey	·	1.9 km	MPC · JPL
657153	2016 JP_{25}	—	September 2, 2008	Kitt Peak	Spacewatch	AGN	1.1 km	MPC · JPL
657154	2016 JX_{25}	—	April 9, 2002	Palomar	NEAT	H	410 m	MPC · JPL
657155	2016 JB_{26}	—	September 14, 2004	Palomar	NEAT	·	1.7 km	MPC · JPL
657156	2016 JS_{26}	—	March 15, 2016	Haleakala	Pan-STARRS 1	·	1.7 km	MPC · JPL
657157	2016 JB_{31}	—	October 25, 2001	Apache Point	SDSS Collaboration	MAR	1.1 km	MPC · JPL
657158	2016 JV_{31}	—	February 3, 2002	Cima Ekar	ADAS	·	1.5 km	MPC · JPL
657159	2016 JO_{36}	—	November 14, 2010	Kitt Peak	Spacewatch	·	910 m	MPC · JPL
657160	2016 JT_{41}	—	August 17, 2012	Haleakala	Pan-STARRS 1	·	1.7 km	MPC · JPL
657161	2016 JH_{45}	—	May 2, 2016	Haleakala	Pan-STARRS 1	·	2.0 km	MPC · JPL
657162	2016 JG_{47}	—	September 20, 2008	Kitt Peak	Spacewatch	·	1.4 km	MPC · JPL
657163	2016 JR_{53}	—	May 10, 2016	Mount Lemmon	Mount Lemmon Survey	·	920 m	MPC · JPL
657164	2016 JG_{55}	—	May 2, 2016	Apache Point	SDSS Collaboration	·	1.3 km	MPC · JPL
657165	2016 JN_{65}	—	May 2, 2016	Haleakala	Pan-STARRS 1	·	1.3 km	MPC · JPL
657166	2016 JW_{70}	—	May 1, 2016	Cerro Tololo-DECam	DECam	·	1.4 km	MPC · JPL
657167	2016 JF_{73}	—	May 1, 2016	Haleakala	Pan-STARRS 1	·	1.5 km	MPC · JPL
657168	2016 KD_{2}	—	September 14, 2013	Haleakala	Pan-STARRS 1	·	1.1 km	MPC · JPL
657169	2016 KH_{4}	—	May 27, 2016	Haleakala	Pan-STARRS 1	H	460 m	MPC · JPL
657170	2016 KJ_{5}	—	May 30, 2016	Haleakala	Pan-STARRS 1	·	1.7 km	MPC · JPL
657171	2016 KL_{8}	—	January 17, 2015	Haleakala	Pan-STARRS 1	·	1.8 km	MPC · JPL
657172	2016 KD_{13}	—	May 30, 2016	Haleakala	Pan-STARRS 1	·	1.9 km	MPC · JPL
657173	2016 KR_{14}	—	October 25, 2012	Kitt Peak	Spacewatch	·	2.1 km	MPC · JPL
657174	2016 LH_{2}	—	May 28, 2016	Palomar	Palomar Transient Factory	EUN	1.1 km	MPC · JPL
657175	2016 LT_{6}	—	March 15, 2012	Mount Lemmon	Mount Lemmon Survey	·	640 m	MPC · JPL
657176	2016 LU_{6}	—	June 4, 2016	Mount Lemmon	Mount Lemmon Survey	·	2.1 km	MPC · JPL
657177	2016 LQ_{7}	—	March 18, 2016	Haleakala	Pan-STARRS 1	·	2.6 km	MPC · JPL
657178	2016 LR_{12}	—	October 19, 2007	Catalina	CSS	·	640 m	MPC · JPL
657179	2016 LH_{16}	—	February 21, 2003	Palomar	NEAT	·	1.1 km	MPC · JPL
657180	2016 LM_{17}	—	February 24, 2015	Haleakala	Pan-STARRS 1	·	1.8 km	MPC · JPL
657181	2016 LM_{19}	—	October 15, 2007	Kitt Peak	Spacewatch	EOS	1.5 km	MPC · JPL
657182	2016 LL_{21}	—	February 13, 2015	Charleston	R. Holmes	·	1.5 km	MPC · JPL
657183	2016 LQ_{21}	—	February 16, 2015	Haleakala	Pan-STARRS 1	·	1.8 km	MPC · JPL
657184	2016 LZ_{21}	—	December 3, 2013	Mount Lemmon	Mount Lemmon Survey	·	1.6 km	MPC · JPL
657185	2016 LO_{23}	—	June 5, 2016	Haleakala	Pan-STARRS 1	EOS	1.6 km	MPC · JPL
657186	2016 LV_{23}	—	January 22, 2015	Haleakala	Pan-STARRS 1	·	1.5 km	MPC · JPL
657187	2016 LW_{24}	—	December 19, 2000	Kitt Peak	Spacewatch	·	1.9 km	MPC · JPL
657188	2016 LS_{31}	—	September 28, 2008	Mount Lemmon	Mount Lemmon Survey	·	1.5 km	MPC · JPL
657189	2016 LU_{33}	—	June 5, 2016	Haleakala	Pan-STARRS 1	·	1.3 km	MPC · JPL
657190	2016 LJ_{36}	—	June 5, 2016	Haleakala	Pan-STARRS 1	·	1.6 km	MPC · JPL
657191	2016 LA_{39}	—	May 23, 2011	Kitt Peak	Spacewatch	·	2.0 km	MPC · JPL
657192	2016 LL_{44}	—	June 7, 2016	Mount Lemmon	Mount Lemmon Survey	·	2.9 km	MPC · JPL
657193	2016 LO_{50}	—	November 2, 2008	Kitt Peak	Spacewatch	·	1.8 km	MPC · JPL
657194	2016 LZ_{55}	—	May 21, 2015	Haleakala	Pan-STARRS 1	·	2.1 km	MPC · JPL
657195	2016 LQ_{57}	—	January 13, 2008	Kitt Peak	Spacewatch	EUP	3.4 km	MPC · JPL
657196	2016 LY_{57}	—	January 27, 2015	Haleakala	Pan-STARRS 1	·	1.7 km	MPC · JPL
657197	2016 LN_{60}	—	April 23, 2015	Haleakala	Pan-STARRS 2	·	2.6 km	MPC · JPL
657198	2016 LO_{62}	—	August 27, 2005	Kitt Peak	Spacewatch	·	2.5 km	MPC · JPL
657199	2016 LJ_{67}	—	November 23, 2006	Mount Lemmon	Mount Lemmon Survey	·	1.6 km	MPC · JPL
657200	2016 LP_{68}	—	June 8, 2016	Haleakala	Pan-STARRS 1	·	2.6 km	MPC · JPL

== 657201–657300 ==
back to top

Designation			Discovery			Properties		Ref
Permanent	Provisional	Named after	Date	Site	Discoverer(s)	Category	Diam.	Ref
657201	2016 LY_{68}	—	June 5, 2016	Haleakala	Pan-STARRS 1	TIR	2.0 km	MPC · JPL
657202	2016 LM_{77}	—	June 4, 2016	Mount Lemmon	Mount Lemmon Survey	·	1.0 km	MPC · JPL
657203	2016 LQ_{80}	—	June 8, 2016	Haleakala	Pan-STARRS 1	·	790 m	MPC · JPL
657204	2016 LM_{85}	—	June 5, 2016	Haleakala	Pan-STARRS 1	TIR	1.8 km	MPC · JPL
657205	2016 LK_{86}	—	June 8, 2016	Haleakala	Pan-STARRS 1	·	1.9 km	MPC · JPL
657206	2016 LC_{97}	—	December 29, 2014	Haleakala	Pan-STARRS 1	NAE	2.2 km	MPC · JPL
657207	2016 LF_{98}	—	June 5, 2016	Haleakala	Pan-STARRS 1	·	2.4 km	MPC · JPL
657208	2016 LL_{100}	—	June 7, 2016	Haleakala	Pan-STARRS 1	TIR	2.7 km	MPC · JPL
657209	2016 LP_{103}	—	June 8, 2016	Haleakala	Pan-STARRS 1	·	580 m	MPC · JPL
657210	2016 MQ_{2}	—	March 7, 2014	Kitt Peak	Spacewatch	L4	6.9 km	MPC · JPL
657211	2016 MG_{4}	—	September 4, 2011	Haleakala	Pan-STARRS 1	·	2.2 km	MPC · JPL
657212	2016 MN_{4}	—	August 5, 2005	Palomar	NEAT	TIR	2.0 km	MPC · JPL
657213	2016 MK_{5}	—	October 4, 2007	Mount Lemmon	Mount Lemmon Survey	DOR	1.7 km	MPC · JPL
657214	2016 NZ_{1}	—	March 23, 2015	Haleakala	Pan-STARRS 1	·	940 m	MPC · JPL
657215	2016 ND_{4}	—	September 4, 2011	Haleakala	Pan-STARRS 1	VER	2.5 km	MPC · JPL
657216	2016 NJ_{4}	—	December 23, 2012	Haleakala	Pan-STARRS 1	·	2.3 km	MPC · JPL
657217	2016 NX_{5}	—	May 14, 2012	Mount Lemmon	Mount Lemmon Survey	·	670 m	MPC · JPL
657218	2016 NC_{7}	—	January 5, 2014	Haleakala	Pan-STARRS 1	·	2.9 km	MPC · JPL
657219	2016 NH_{8}	—	August 22, 2003	Palomar	NEAT	·	2.0 km	MPC · JPL
657220	2016 NR_{8}	—	September 6, 2013	Mount Lemmon	Mount Lemmon Survey	·	670 m	MPC · JPL
657221	2016 NX_{10}	—	February 28, 2012	Haleakala	Pan-STARRS 1	·	730 m	MPC · JPL
657222	2016 NR_{12}	—	August 8, 2011	La Sagra	OAM	·	3.5 km	MPC · JPL
657223	2016 NM_{21}	—	February 20, 2012	Haleakala	Pan-STARRS 1	·	800 m	MPC · JPL
657224	2016 NJ_{26}	—	July 8, 2016	Haleakala	Pan-STARRS 1	·	2.0 km	MPC · JPL
657225	2016 NF_{27}	—	July 8, 2016	Haleakala	Pan-STARRS 1	TIR	1.8 km	MPC · JPL
657226	2016 NL_{35}	—	January 26, 2014	Haleakala	Pan-STARRS 1	·	1.7 km	MPC · JPL
657227	2016 NX_{35}	—	July 12, 2016	Mount Lemmon	Mount Lemmon Survey	·	2.5 km	MPC · JPL
657228	2016 NG_{36}	—	September 30, 2003	Kitt Peak	Spacewatch	·	610 m	MPC · JPL
657229	2016 NK_{36}	—	April 18, 2009	Mount Lemmon	Mount Lemmon Survey	·	720 m	MPC · JPL
657230	2016 NL_{36}	—	November 4, 2007	Kitt Peak	Spacewatch	·	640 m	MPC · JPL
657231	2016 NN_{40}	—	January 16, 2009	Mount Lemmon	Mount Lemmon Survey	·	2.1 km	MPC · JPL
657232	2016 NH_{42}	—	October 8, 2008	Mount Lemmon	Mount Lemmon Survey	·	1.3 km	MPC · JPL
657233	2016 NY_{44}	—	September 23, 2011	Haleakala	Pan-STARRS 1	·	1.9 km	MPC · JPL
657234	2016 NS_{46}	—	January 29, 2007	Kitt Peak	Spacewatch	·	2.9 km	MPC · JPL
657235	2016 NY_{46}	—	November 18, 2006	Kitt Peak	Spacewatch	·	610 m	MPC · JPL
657236	2016 NK_{49}	—	September 18, 2003	Kitt Peak	Spacewatch	·	640 m	MPC · JPL
657237	2016 NB_{50}	—	July 25, 2006	Palomar	NEAT	·	720 m	MPC · JPL
657238	2016 ND_{50}	—	September 21, 2003	Socorro	LINEAR	·	560 m	MPC · JPL
657239	2016 NW_{52}	—	May 15, 2015	Haleakala	Pan-STARRS 1	·	2.5 km	MPC · JPL
657240	2016 NR_{64}	—	October 24, 2005	Kitt Peak	Spacewatch	·	2.4 km	MPC · JPL
657241	2016 NP_{66}	—	August 27, 2011	Haleakala	Pan-STARRS 1	·	2.2 km	MPC · JPL
657242	2016 NV_{66}	—	July 11, 2005	Mount Lemmon	Mount Lemmon Survey	·	2.7 km	MPC · JPL
657243	2016 NF_{67}	—	September 20, 2011	Mount Lemmon	Mount Lemmon Survey	THM	2.1 km	MPC · JPL
657244	2016 NH_{68}	—	October 22, 2012	Mount Lemmon	Mount Lemmon Survey	HOF	2.1 km	MPC · JPL
657245	2016 NU_{68}	—	September 11, 2007	Mount Lemmon	Mount Lemmon Survey	(18466)	1.9 km	MPC · JPL
657246	2016 NG_{69}	—	January 30, 2008	Mount Lemmon	Mount Lemmon Survey	·	2.6 km	MPC · JPL
657247	2016 NR_{69}	—	July 5, 2016	Haleakala	Pan-STARRS 1	·	2.4 km	MPC · JPL
657248	2016 NG_{70}	—	September 26, 2006	Mount Lemmon	Mount Lemmon Survey	·	1.8 km	MPC · JPL
657249	2016 NV_{70}	—	January 11, 2008	Kitt Peak	Spacewatch	·	2.5 km	MPC · JPL
657250	2016 NB_{72}	—	July 12, 2016	Mount Lemmon	Mount Lemmon Survey	·	1.4 km	MPC · JPL
657251	2016 NZ_{73}	—	July 5, 2016	Haleakala	Pan-STARRS 1	·	1.7 km	MPC · JPL
657252	2016 NA_{74}	—	September 29, 2003	Kitt Peak	Spacewatch	NEM	1.9 km	MPC · JPL
657253	2016 NM_{74}	—	October 23, 2012	Piszkés-tető	K. Sárneczky, A. Király	·	1.6 km	MPC · JPL
657254	2016 NB_{77}	—	September 30, 2011	Piszkés-tető	K. Sárneczky, S. Kürti	·	2.5 km	MPC · JPL
657255	2016 NC_{78}	—	July 5, 2016	Haleakala	Pan-STARRS 1	EOS	1.6 km	MPC · JPL
657256	2016 NG_{78}	—	February 15, 2013	Haleakala	Pan-STARRS 1	T_{j} (2.99)	2.6 km	MPC · JPL
657257	2016 NM_{81}	—	July 31, 2005	Palomar	NEAT	·	2.9 km	MPC · JPL
657258	2016 ND_{82}	—	October 24, 2011	Haleakala	Pan-STARRS 1	·	2.5 km	MPC · JPL
657259	2016 NN_{82}	—	October 19, 2011	Haleakala	Pan-STARRS 1	·	2.3 km	MPC · JPL
657260	2016 NX_{82}	—	July 23, 2003	Palomar	NEAT	·	1.7 km	MPC · JPL
657261	2016 NQ_{85}	—	July 11, 2016	Haleakala	Pan-STARRS 1	·	2.0 km	MPC · JPL
657262	2016 NJ_{86}	—	September 17, 2006	Catalina	CSS	·	1.7 km	MPC · JPL
657263	2016 NU_{87}	—	August 22, 2005	Palomar	NEAT	·	2.0 km	MPC · JPL
657264	2016 NE_{89}	—	July 12, 2016	Mount Lemmon	Mount Lemmon Survey	·	2.2 km	MPC · JPL
657265	2016 NE_{90}	—	July 14, 2016	Haleakala	Pan-STARRS 1	·	2.3 km	MPC · JPL
657266	2016 NA_{91}	—	July 7, 2016	Mount Lemmon	Mount Lemmon Survey	·	2.8 km	MPC · JPL
657267	2016 NC_{91}	—	July 4, 2016	Haleakala	Pan-STARRS 1	·	2.6 km	MPC · JPL
657268	2016 NF_{107}	—	July 5, 2016	Haleakala	Pan-STARRS 1	·	1.4 km	MPC · JPL
657269	2016 NK_{107}	—	July 9, 2016	Haleakala	Pan-STARRS 1	·	2.1 km	MPC · JPL
657270	2016 NL_{107}	—	July 7, 2016	Haleakala	Pan-STARRS 1	·	2.0 km	MPC · JPL
657271	2016 NU_{108}	—	July 4, 2016	Haleakala	Pan-STARRS 1	·	2.8 km	MPC · JPL
657272	2016 NC_{111}	—	July 5, 2016	Mount Lemmon	Mount Lemmon Survey	·	1.4 km	MPC · JPL
657273	2016 NZ_{113}	—	September 8, 2011	Haleakala	Pan-STARRS 1	·	2.1 km	MPC · JPL
657274	2016 NE_{120}	—	July 7, 2016	Haleakala	Pan-STARRS 1	·	2.0 km	MPC · JPL
657275	2016 NF_{120}	—	July 5, 2016	Haleakala	Pan-STARRS 1	VER	1.9 km	MPC · JPL
657276	2016 NZ_{132}	—	January 21, 2015	Haleakala	Pan-STARRS 1	·	590 m	MPC · JPL
657277	2016 NQ_{134}	—	July 11, 2016	Haleakala	Pan-STARRS 1	·	2.3 km	MPC · JPL
657278	2016 NL_{142}	—	July 6, 2016	Haleakala	Pan-STARRS 1	·	2.5 km	MPC · JPL
657279	2016 NT_{142}	—	July 3, 2016	Mount Lemmon	Mount Lemmon Survey	·	2.5 km	MPC · JPL
657280	2016 NR_{146}	—	July 13, 2016	Mount Lemmon	Mount Lemmon Survey	·	2.1 km	MPC · JPL
657281	2016 NP_{147}	—	July 5, 2016	Haleakala	Pan-STARRS 1	TIR	3.0 km	MPC · JPL
657282	2016 NG_{157}	—	July 4, 2016	Haleakala	Pan-STARRS 1	·	1.3 km	MPC · JPL
657283	2016 NV_{157}	—	July 12, 2016	Mount Lemmon	Mount Lemmon Survey	·	2.6 km	MPC · JPL
657284	2016 NB_{165}	—	July 11, 2016	Haleakala	Pan-STARRS 1	·	2.3 km	MPC · JPL
657285	2016 NC_{172}	—	July 11, 2016	Haleakala	Pan-STARRS 1	(895)	2.7 km	MPC · JPL
657286	2016 NK_{175}	—	July 9, 2016	Haleakala	Pan-STARRS 1	·	2.7 km	MPC · JPL
657287	2016 NE_{176}	—	October 11, 1999	Kitt Peak	Spacewatch	·	2.4 km	MPC · JPL
657288	2016 OK	—	July 13, 2016	Catalina	CSS	·	3.6 km	MPC · JPL
657289	2016 OR_{3}	—	November 21, 2006	Mount Lemmon	Mount Lemmon Survey	·	780 m	MPC · JPL
657290	2016 OZ_{3}	—	July 10, 2016	Mount Lemmon	Mount Lemmon Survey	HYG	2.3 km	MPC · JPL
657291	2016 ON_{6}	—	July 30, 2016	Haleakala	Pan-STARRS 1	·	2.5 km	MPC · JPL
657292	2016 OV_{10}	—	July 29, 2016	Haleakala	Pan-STARRS 1	·	2.3 km	MPC · JPL
657293	2016 OA_{11}	—	July 29, 2016	Haleakala	Pan-STARRS 1	·	1.4 km	MPC · JPL
657294	2016 OB_{11}	—	July 30, 2016	Haleakala	Pan-STARRS 1	·	2.6 km	MPC · JPL
657295	2016 OD_{11}	—	July 31, 2016	Haleakala	Pan-STARRS 1	·	1.6 km	MPC · JPL
657296	2016 OX_{12}	—	October 23, 2011	Haleakala	Pan-STARRS 1	·	2.6 km	MPC · JPL
657297	2016 OR_{14}	—	November 27, 2006	Mount Lemmon	Mount Lemmon Survey	·	2.1 km	MPC · JPL
657298	2016 PQ_{2}	—	August 1, 2016	Haleakala	Pan-STARRS 1	·	1.7 km	MPC · JPL
657299	2016 PG_{4}	—	November 27, 2013	Haleakala	Pan-STARRS 1	·	710 m	MPC · JPL
657300	2016 PW_{4}	—	September 15, 2006	Kitt Peak	Spacewatch	·	1.4 km	MPC · JPL

== 657301–657400 ==
back to top

Designation			Discovery			Properties		Ref
Permanent	Provisional	Named after	Date	Site	Discoverer(s)	Category	Diam.	Ref
657301	2016 PU_{5}	—	September 13, 2007	Mount Lemmon	Mount Lemmon Survey	AEO	870 m	MPC · JPL
657302	2016 PH_{7}	—	July 14, 2016	Mount Lemmon	Mount Lemmon Survey	·	850 m	MPC · JPL
657303	2016 PL_{9}	—	September 14, 2007	Andrushivka	Y. Ivaščenko	·	2.2 km	MPC · JPL
657304	2016 PD_{12}	—	June 2, 2016	Haleakala	Pan-STARRS 1	·	3.2 km	MPC · JPL
657305	2016 PR_{13}	—	August 6, 2016	Haleakala	Pan-STARRS 1	·	2.1 km	MPC · JPL
657306	2016 PU_{22}	—	July 8, 2016	Haleakala	Pan-STARRS 1	EOS	1.4 km	MPC · JPL
657307	2016 PY_{23}	—	August 7, 2016	Haleakala	Pan-STARRS 1	·	450 m	MPC · JPL
657308	2016 PV_{25}	—	March 11, 2014	Mount Lemmon	Mount Lemmon Survey	·	2.5 km	MPC · JPL
657309	2016 PW_{28}	—	September 25, 2011	Haleakala	Pan-STARRS 1	·	2.3 km	MPC · JPL
657310	2016 PC_{31}	—	August 6, 2016	Haleakala	Pan-STARRS 1	·	1.9 km	MPC · JPL
657311	2016 PQ_{31}	—	August 6, 2016	Haleakala	Pan-STARRS 1	·	2.5 km	MPC · JPL
657312	2016 PE_{32}	—	October 20, 2012	Haleakala	Pan-STARRS 1	·	1.7 km	MPC · JPL
657313	2016 PU_{35}	—	September 26, 2006	Mount Lemmon	Mount Lemmon Survey	·	1.7 km	MPC · JPL
657314	2016 PE_{36}	—	August 2, 2016	Haleakala	Pan-STARRS 1	·	1.6 km	MPC · JPL
657315	2016 PW_{40}	—	November 15, 2006	Kitt Peak	Spacewatch	·	2.7 km	MPC · JPL
657316	2016 PD_{41}	—	December 31, 2008	Kitt Peak	Spacewatch	·	3.1 km	MPC · JPL
657317	2016 PY_{43}	—	July 5, 2016	Haleakala	Pan-STARRS 1	·	2.0 km	MPC · JPL
657318	2016 PE_{44}	—	July 5, 2016	Haleakala	Pan-STARRS 1	·	2.6 km	MPC · JPL
657319	2016 PN_{44}	—	November 11, 2001	Apache Point	SDSS Collaboration	·	2.0 km	MPC · JPL
657320	2016 PX_{44}	—	December 23, 2012	Haleakala	Pan-STARRS 1	·	2.3 km	MPC · JPL
657321	2016 PA_{47}	—	November 12, 2006	Mount Lemmon	Mount Lemmon Survey	·	2.6 km	MPC · JPL
657322	2016 PG_{49}	—	December 21, 2012	Mount Lemmon	Mount Lemmon Survey	EOS	1.7 km	MPC · JPL
657323	2016 PP_{53}	—	August 7, 2016	Haleakala	Pan-STARRS 1	VER	2.3 km	MPC · JPL
657324	2016 PH_{55}	—	August 7, 2016	Haleakala	Pan-STARRS 1	VER	2.1 km	MPC · JPL
657325	2016 PQ_{58}	—	October 28, 2006	Catalina	CSS	·	660 m	MPC · JPL
657326	2016 PM_{59}	—	August 7, 2016	Haleakala	Pan-STARRS 1	·	2.2 km	MPC · JPL
657327	2016 PZ_{59}	—	February 28, 2008	Mount Lemmon	Mount Lemmon Survey	VER	2.1 km	MPC · JPL
657328	2016 PG_{61}	—	October 1, 2005	Kitt Peak	Spacewatch	·	3.1 km	MPC · JPL
657329	2016 PO_{62}	—	August 30, 2011	Les Engarouines	L. Bernasconi	·	2.9 km	MPC · JPL
657330	2016 PF_{64}	—	March 11, 2014	Mount Lemmon	Mount Lemmon Survey	·	2.3 km	MPC · JPL
657331	2016 PO_{65}	—	March 16, 2010	Catalina	CSS	·	2.3 km	MPC · JPL
657332	2016 PZ_{65}	—	December 1, 2003	Kitt Peak	Spacewatch	·	670 m	MPC · JPL
657333	2016 PK_{67}	—	February 1, 2013	Catalina	CSS	·	3.7 km	MPC · JPL
657334	2016 PB_{68}	—	August 8, 2016	Haleakala	Pan-STARRS 1	·	2.4 km	MPC · JPL
657335	2016 PJ_{68}	—	September 24, 2011	Haleakala	Pan-STARRS 1	·	2.6 km	MPC · JPL
657336	2016 PT_{72}	—	December 31, 2007	Kitt Peak	Spacewatch	EOS	1.4 km	MPC · JPL
657337	2016 PM_{74}	—	December 4, 2012	Mount Lemmon	Mount Lemmon Survey	·	1.4 km	MPC · JPL
657338	2016 PW_{74}	—	August 10, 2016	Haleakala	Pan-STARRS 1	·	1.4 km	MPC · JPL
657339	2016 PU_{75}	—	August 10, 2016	Haleakala	Pan-STARRS 1	·	490 m	MPC · JPL
657340	2016 PC_{76}	—	November 3, 2011	Mount Lemmon	Mount Lemmon Survey	·	2.2 km	MPC · JPL
657341	2016 PZ_{77}	—	August 19, 2006	Kitt Peak	Spacewatch	·	570 m	MPC · JPL
657342	2016 PG_{82}	—	November 20, 2006	Kitt Peak	Spacewatch	·	1.8 km	MPC · JPL
657343	2016 PZ_{82}	—	August 2, 2016	Haleakala	Pan-STARRS 1	·	2.6 km	MPC · JPL
657344	2016 PJ_{83}	—	October 28, 2005	Mount Lemmon	Mount Lemmon Survey	THM	2.0 km	MPC · JPL
657345	2016 PT_{84}	—	January 13, 2008	Kitt Peak	Spacewatch	EOS	1.5 km	MPC · JPL
657346	2016 PZ_{85}	—	September 26, 2011	Kitt Peak	Spacewatch	·	2.7 km	MPC · JPL
657347	2016 PX_{89}	—	July 9, 2015	Haleakala	Pan-STARRS 1	·	1.9 km	MPC · JPL
657348	2016 PH_{92}	—	October 2, 2006	Mount Lemmon	Mount Lemmon Survey	·	2.1 km	MPC · JPL
657349	2016 PY_{94}	—	August 2, 2016	Haleakala	Pan-STARRS 1	·	2.3 km	MPC · JPL
657350	2016 PA_{95}	—	February 14, 2008	Mount Lemmon	Mount Lemmon Survey	VER	2.3 km	MPC · JPL
657351	2016 PE_{95}	—	August 2, 2016	Haleakala	Pan-STARRS 1	EOS	1.6 km	MPC · JPL
657352	2016 PN_{95}	—	September 25, 2011	Haleakala	Pan-STARRS 1	·	2.3 km	MPC · JPL
657353	2016 PP_{95}	—	August 3, 2016	Haleakala	Pan-STARRS 1	EOS	1.7 km	MPC · JPL
657354	2016 PW_{95}	—	January 17, 2013	Haleakala	Pan-STARRS 1	·	2.3 km	MPC · JPL
657355	2016 PD_{96}	—	August 9, 2016	Haleakala	Pan-STARRS 1	·	2.3 km	MPC · JPL
657356	2016 PG_{96}	—	August 10, 2016	Haleakala	Pan-STARRS 1	·	2.6 km	MPC · JPL
657357	2016 PN_{96}	—	August 12, 2016	Haleakala	Pan-STARRS 1	·	2.5 km	MPC · JPL
657358	2016 PP_{96}	—	August 14, 2016	Haleakala	Pan-STARRS 1	·	2.4 km	MPC · JPL
657359	2016 PW_{98}	—	September 2, 2011	Haleakala	Pan-STARRS 1	·	2.7 km	MPC · JPL
657360	2016 PQ_{99}	—	August 10, 2016	Haleakala	Pan-STARRS 1	·	2.1 km	MPC · JPL
657361	2016 PH_{100}	—	May 18, 2015	Haleakala	Pan-STARRS 1	EOS	1.6 km	MPC · JPL
657362	2016 PZ_{101}	—	February 15, 2013	Haleakala	Pan-STARRS 1	·	2.2 km	MPC · JPL
657363	2016 PE_{105}	—	May 22, 2015	Haleakala	Pan-STARRS 1	·	1.8 km	MPC · JPL
657364	2016 PA_{106}	—	August 1, 2016	Haleakala	Pan-STARRS 1	·	2.9 km	MPC · JPL
657365	2016 PK_{106}	—	September 21, 2011	Kitt Peak	Spacewatch	·	2.5 km	MPC · JPL
657366	2016 PG_{108}	—	February 9, 2008	Mount Lemmon	Mount Lemmon Survey	·	2.2 km	MPC · JPL
657367	2016 PQ_{108}	—	August 2, 2016	Haleakala	Pan-STARRS 1	·	2.0 km	MPC · JPL
657368	2016 PP_{116}	—	November 23, 2006	Kitt Peak	Spacewatch	THM	1.7 km	MPC · JPL
657369	2016 PN_{118}	—	May 13, 2015	Mount Lemmon	Mount Lemmon Survey	EOS	1.4 km	MPC · JPL
657370	2016 PY_{124}	—	August 10, 2016	Haleakala	Pan-STARRS 1	·	2.4 km	MPC · JPL
657371	2016 PK_{127}	—	December 22, 2012	Haleakala	Pan-STARRS 1	·	1.5 km	MPC · JPL
657372	2016 PA_{128}	—	August 2, 2016	Haleakala	Pan-STARRS 1	T_{j} (2.99)	2.7 km	MPC · JPL
657373	2016 PB_{128}	—	August 8, 2016	Haleakala	Pan-STARRS 1	VER	2.0 km	MPC · JPL
657374	2016 PO_{133}	—	August 14, 2016	Haleakala	Pan-STARRS 1	·	610 m	MPC · JPL
657375	2016 PO_{138}	—	August 2, 2016	Haleakala	Pan-STARRS 1	V	430 m	MPC · JPL
657376	2016 PJ_{151}	—	August 2, 2016	Haleakala	Pan-STARRS 1	·	2.7 km	MPC · JPL
657377	2016 PQ_{152}	—	August 10, 2016	Haleakala	Pan-STARRS 1	·	2.6 km	MPC · JPL
657378	2016 PT_{152}	—	August 1, 2016	Haleakala	Pan-STARRS 1	·	2.3 km	MPC · JPL
657379	2016 PZ_{152}	—	August 2, 2016	Haleakala	Pan-STARRS 1	·	2.2 km	MPC · JPL
657380	2016 PC_{153}	—	August 7, 2016	Haleakala	Pan-STARRS 1	·	2.5 km	MPC · JPL
657381	2016 PD_{153}	—	August 1, 2016	Haleakala	Pan-STARRS 1	·	2.3 km	MPC · JPL
657382	2016 PU_{153}	—	August 14, 2016	Haleakala	Pan-STARRS 1	·	2.4 km	MPC · JPL
657383	2016 PW_{153}	—	August 1, 2016	Haleakala	Pan-STARRS 1	·	2.4 km	MPC · JPL
657384	2016 PY_{153}	—	August 14, 2016	Haleakala	Pan-STARRS 1	·	2.5 km	MPC · JPL
657385	2016 PQ_{154}	—	August 1, 2016	Haleakala	Pan-STARRS 1	·	2.6 km	MPC · JPL
657386	2016 PS_{154}	—	August 2, 2016	Haleakala	Pan-STARRS 1	EOS	1.4 km	MPC · JPL
657387	2016 PW_{154}	—	August 7, 2016	Haleakala	Pan-STARRS 1	·	1.7 km	MPC · JPL
657388	2016 PU_{155}	—	August 6, 2016	Haleakala	Pan-STARRS 1	·	2.8 km	MPC · JPL
657389	2016 PA_{156}	—	August 2, 2016	Haleakala	Pan-STARRS 1	·	2.3 km	MPC · JPL
657390	2016 PB_{157}	—	August 1, 2016	Haleakala	Pan-STARRS 1	·	2.6 km	MPC · JPL
657391	2016 PQ_{157}	—	August 3, 2016	Haleakala	Pan-STARRS 1	·	1.7 km	MPC · JPL
657392	2016 PZ_{158}	—	August 7, 2016	Haleakala	Pan-STARRS 1	·	1.6 km	MPC · JPL
657393	2016 PC_{159}	—	August 2, 2016	Haleakala	Pan-STARRS 1	·	2.1 km	MPC · JPL
657394	2016 PW_{160}	—	August 3, 2016	Haleakala	Pan-STARRS 1	·	2.7 km	MPC · JPL
657395	2016 PZ_{160}	—	August 10, 2016	Haleakala	Pan-STARRS 1	·	2.7 km	MPC · JPL
657396	2016 PF_{161}	—	August 2, 2016	Haleakala	Pan-STARRS 1	·	1.9 km	MPC · JPL
657397	2016 PY_{164}	—	August 2, 2016	Haleakala	Pan-STARRS 1	·	1.6 km	MPC · JPL
657398	2016 PX_{165}	—	August 14, 2016	Haleakala	Pan-STARRS 1	·	2.3 km	MPC · JPL
657399	2016 PK_{166}	—	August 14, 2016	Haleakala	Pan-STARRS 1	·	900 m	MPC · JPL
657400	2016 PT_{174}	—	August 14, 2016	Haleakala	Pan-STARRS 1	VER	2.0 km	MPC · JPL

== 657401–657500 ==
back to top

Designation			Discovery			Properties		Ref
Permanent	Provisional	Named after	Date	Site	Discoverer(s)	Category	Diam.	Ref
657401	2016 PB_{176}	—	August 8, 2016	Haleakala	Pan-STARRS 1	·	2.4 km	MPC · JPL
657402	2016 PD_{176}	—	August 10, 2016	Haleakala	Pan-STARRS 1	EOS	1.6 km	MPC · JPL
657403	2016 PH_{185}	—	August 9, 2016	Haleakala	Pan-STARRS 1	·	2.5 km	MPC · JPL
657404	2016 PQ_{189}	—	August 10, 2016	Haleakala	Pan-STARRS 1	·	2.3 km	MPC · JPL
657405	2016 PF_{190}	—	August 12, 2016	Haleakala	Pan-STARRS 1	·	2.0 km	MPC · JPL
657406	2016 PJ_{207}	—	August 2, 2016	Haleakala	Pan-STARRS 1	·	1.9 km	MPC · JPL
657407	2016 PW_{208}	—	August 7, 2016	Haleakala	Pan-STARRS 1	·	2.4 km	MPC · JPL
657408	2016 PN_{211}	—	August 3, 2016	Haleakala	Pan-STARRS 1	·	2.4 km	MPC · JPL
657409	2016 PN_{212}	—	August 11, 2016	Haleakala	Pan-STARRS 1	EOS	1.3 km	MPC · JPL
657410	2016 PQ_{255}	—	August 8, 2016	Haleakala	Pan-STARRS 1	·	1.8 km	MPC · JPL
657411	2016 PR_{255}	—	August 2, 2016	Haleakala	Pan-STARRS 1	·	2.1 km	MPC · JPL
657412	2016 PC_{259}	—	August 8, 2016	Haleakala	Pan-STARRS 1	·	1.9 km	MPC · JPL
657413	2016 PE_{259}	—	August 8, 2016	Haleakala	Pan-STARRS 1	·	2.0 km	MPC · JPL
657414	2016 PN_{263}	—	August 9, 2016	Haleakala	Pan-STARRS 1	·	1.9 km	MPC · JPL
657415	2016 PW_{264}	—	August 6, 2016	Haleakala	Pan-STARRS 1	·	1.8 km	MPC · JPL
657416	2016 PF_{270}	—	August 3, 2016	Haleakala	Pan-STARRS 1	·	1.5 km	MPC · JPL
657417	2016 PO_{288}	—	August 3, 2016	Haleakala	Pan-STARRS 1	·	3.0 km	MPC · JPL
657418	2016 QQ	—	May 22, 2015	Haleakala	Pan-STARRS 1	EOS	1.5 km	MPC · JPL
657419	2016 QQ_{1}	—	May 31, 2008	Siding Spring	SSS	PHO	1.2 km	MPC · JPL
657420	2016 QO_{4}	—	February 27, 2012	Haleakala	Pan-STARRS 1	·	620 m	MPC · JPL
657421	2016 QQ_{4}	—	August 3, 2016	Haleakala	Pan-STARRS 1	·	500 m	MPC · JPL
657422	2016 QP_{6}	—	November 23, 2011	Drebach	G. Lehmann, J. Kandler	·	2.3 km	MPC · JPL
657423	2016 QD_{12}	—	December 12, 2010	Kitt Peak	Spacewatch	·	610 m	MPC · JPL
657424	2016 QN_{13}	—	January 26, 2006	Mount Lemmon	Mount Lemmon Survey	HNS	1.0 km	MPC · JPL
657425	2016 QF_{14}	—	February 9, 2008	Kitt Peak	Spacewatch	URS	3.5 km	MPC · JPL
657426	2016 QV_{16}	—	October 5, 2013	Haleakala	Pan-STARRS 1	·	770 m	MPC · JPL
657427	2016 QV_{17}	—	September 26, 2011	Kitt Peak	Spacewatch	·	2.3 km	MPC · JPL
657428	2016 QZ_{18}	—	October 8, 2007	Mount Bigelow	CSS	·	1.6 km	MPC · JPL
657429	2016 QB_{19}	—	September 27, 2011	Mount Lemmon	Mount Lemmon Survey	·	3.7 km	MPC · JPL
657430	2016 QQ_{25}	—	August 26, 2011	Piszkéstető	K. Sárneczky	EOS	1.7 km	MPC · JPL
657431	2016 QX_{25}	—	August 26, 2016	Haleakala	Pan-STARRS 1	VER	2.5 km	MPC · JPL
657432	2016 QE_{26}	—	February 20, 2015	Haleakala	Pan-STARRS 1	·	1.9 km	MPC · JPL
657433	2016 QC_{27}	—	April 24, 2011	Kitt Peak	Spacewatch	JUN	730 m	MPC · JPL
657434	2016 QW_{31}	—	October 18, 2011	Haleakala	Pan-STARRS 1	·	2.3 km	MPC · JPL
657435	2016 QN_{32}	—	October 18, 2009	Catalina	CSS	·	1.5 km	MPC · JPL
657436	2016 QM_{34}	—	January 4, 2013	Cerro Tololo-DECam	DECam	·	2.3 km	MPC · JPL
657437	2016 QS_{40}	—	September 5, 2013	Kitt Peak	Spacewatch	·	670 m	MPC · JPL
657438	2016 QY_{40}	—	August 12, 2016	Haleakala	Pan-STARRS 1	·	560 m	MPC · JPL
657439	2016 QB_{41}	—	November 11, 1999	Kitt Peak	M. W. Buie, Kern, S. D.	·	650 m	MPC · JPL
657440	2016 QJ_{41}	—	October 13, 2006	Kitt Peak	Spacewatch	·	580 m	MPC · JPL
657441	2016 QT_{41}	—	September 2, 2008	Kitt Peak	Spacewatch	EUN	890 m	MPC · JPL
657442	2016 QV_{41}	—	May 21, 2012	Haleakala	Pan-STARRS 1	·	610 m	MPC · JPL
657443	2016 QU_{42}	—	February 12, 2008	Mount Lemmon	Mount Lemmon Survey	·	2.3 km	MPC · JPL
657444	2016 QP_{43}	—	May 16, 2012	Mount Lemmon	Mount Lemmon Survey	·	730 m	MPC · JPL
657445	2016 QL_{47}	—	November 5, 2007	Mount Lemmon	Mount Lemmon Survey	KOR	1.4 km	MPC · JPL
657446	2016 QX_{47}	—	February 28, 2009	Kitt Peak	Spacewatch	·	600 m	MPC · JPL
657447	2016 QC_{48}	—	August 27, 2006	Kitt Peak	Spacewatch	·	560 m	MPC · JPL
657448	2016 QP_{52}	—	August 3, 2016	Haleakala	Pan-STARRS 1	·	1.8 km	MPC · JPL
657449	2016 QU_{53}	—	September 24, 2005	Kitt Peak	Spacewatch	·	2.3 km	MPC · JPL
657450	2016 QN_{54}	—	May 21, 2005	Mount Lemmon	Mount Lemmon Survey	·	2.7 km	MPC · JPL
657451	2016 QZ_{56}	—	September 27, 2011	Mount Lemmon	Mount Lemmon Survey	·	2.4 km	MPC · JPL
657452	2016 QF_{58}	—	October 23, 2006	Mount Lemmon	Mount Lemmon Survey	·	2.5 km	MPC · JPL
657453	2016 QT_{59}	—	July 11, 2016	Haleakala	Pan-STARRS 1	·	1.7 km	MPC · JPL
657454	2016 QV_{59}	—	May 18, 2015	Haleakala	Pan-STARRS 1	EOS	1.4 km	MPC · JPL
657455	2016 QC_{60}	—	July 29, 2005	Palomar	NEAT	V	810 m	MPC · JPL
657456	2016 QX_{60}	—	September 3, 2005	Mauna Kea	Veillet, C.	·	3.0 km	MPC · JPL
657457	2016 QX_{65}	—	October 7, 2005	Kitt Peak	Spacewatch	·	2.6 km	MPC · JPL
657458	2016 QZ_{66}	—	February 5, 2013	Mount Lemmon	Mount Lemmon Survey	URS	2.8 km	MPC · JPL
657459	2016 QA_{68}	—	August 29, 2016	Mount Lemmon	Mount Lemmon Survey	EOS	1.5 km	MPC · JPL
657460	2016 QE_{68}	—	June 26, 2011	Mount Lemmon	Mount Lemmon Survey	·	1.5 km	MPC · JPL
657461	2016 QE_{71}	—	September 25, 2006	Kitt Peak	Spacewatch	·	620 m	MPC · JPL
657462	2016 QC_{72}	—	April 2, 2006	Kitt Peak	Spacewatch	·	770 m	MPC · JPL
657463	2016 QX_{73}	—	July 11, 2005	Mount Lemmon	Mount Lemmon Survey	·	1.8 km	MPC · JPL
657464	2016 QV_{76}	—	September 2, 2005	Palomar	NEAT	TIR	2.6 km	MPC · JPL
657465	2016 QJ_{78}	—	January 10, 2013	Haleakala	Pan-STARRS 1	·	2.5 km	MPC · JPL
657466	2016 QR_{78}	—	January 4, 2013	Kitt Peak	Spacewatch	EUP	3.2 km	MPC · JPL
657467	2016 QV_{78}	—	October 5, 2005	Mount Lemmon	Mount Lemmon Survey	·	2.2 km	MPC · JPL
657468	2016 QJ_{79}	—	March 30, 2001	Kitt Peak	SKADS	PHO	800 m	MPC · JPL
657469	2016 QY_{80}	—	December 15, 2007	Kitt Peak	Spacewatch	NAE	2.2 km	MPC · JPL
657470	2016 QA_{81}	—	January 13, 2013	Mount Lemmon	Mount Lemmon Survey	·	2.5 km	MPC · JPL
657471	2016 QA_{82}	—	June 19, 2010	Mount Lemmon	Mount Lemmon Survey	·	2.7 km	MPC · JPL
657472	2016 QE_{82}	—	August 28, 2016	Mount Lemmon	Mount Lemmon Survey	EOS	1.5 km	MPC · JPL
657473	2016 QC_{92}	—	August 27, 2016	Haleakala	Pan-STARRS 1	·	1.9 km	MPC · JPL
657474	2016 QF_{92}	—	March 23, 2013	Mount Lemmon	Mount Lemmon Survey	·	3.0 km	MPC · JPL
657475	2016 QL_{92}	—	October 27, 2005	Kitt Peak	Spacewatch	·	2.9 km	MPC · JPL
657476	2016 QS_{92}	—	August 28, 2016	Mount Lemmon	Mount Lemmon Survey	·	2.3 km	MPC · JPL
657477	2016 QT_{94}	—	August 30, 2016	Haleakala	Pan-STARRS 1	ELF	3.2 km	MPC · JPL
657478	2016 QF_{96}	—	November 25, 2005	Kitt Peak	Spacewatch	·	2.2 km	MPC · JPL
657479	2016 QY_{103}	—	August 29, 2016	Mount Lemmon	Mount Lemmon Survey	·	570 m	MPC · JPL
657480	2016 QJ_{104}	—	August 28, 2016	Mount Lemmon	Mount Lemmon Survey	·	2.2 km	MPC · JPL
657481	2016 QR_{105}	—	August 30, 2016	Mount Lemmon	Mount Lemmon Survey	·	590 m	MPC · JPL
657482	2016 QN_{106}	—	August 30, 2016	Mount Lemmon	Mount Lemmon Survey	·	2.1 km	MPC · JPL
657483	2016 QT_{106}	—	August 30, 2016	Mount Lemmon	Mount Lemmon Survey	EOS	1.5 km	MPC · JPL
657484	2016 QP_{113}	—	August 29, 2016	Mount Lemmon	Mount Lemmon Survey	·	2.4 km	MPC · JPL
657485	2016 QQ_{113}	—	August 30, 2016	Mount Lemmon	Mount Lemmon Survey	·	2.0 km	MPC · JPL
657486	2016 QL_{125}	—	August 28, 2016	Mount Lemmon	Mount Lemmon Survey	·	420 m	MPC · JPL
657487	2016 QC_{127}	—	August 28, 2016	Mount Lemmon	Mount Lemmon Survey	·	3.1 km	MPC · JPL
657488	2016 QN_{127}	—	August 28, 2016	Mount Lemmon	Mount Lemmon Survey	·	2.3 km	MPC · JPL
657489	2016 QG_{128}	—	August 27, 2016	Haleakala	Pan-STARRS 1	·	600 m	MPC · JPL
657490	2016 QT_{129}	—	August 28, 2016	Mount Lemmon	Mount Lemmon Survey	·	1.9 km	MPC · JPL
657491	2016 QK_{130}	—	August 30, 2016	Mount Lemmon	Mount Lemmon Survey	·	2.1 km	MPC · JPL
657492	2016 QN_{130}	—	August 26, 2016	Haleakala	Pan-STARRS 1	·	2.2 km	MPC · JPL
657493	2016 QQ_{131}	—	August 27, 2011	Mayhill-ISON	L. Elenin	·	1.8 km	MPC · JPL
657494	2016 QS_{131}	—	August 29, 2016	Mount Lemmon	Mount Lemmon Survey	·	1.9 km	MPC · JPL
657495	2016 QP_{132}	—	September 1, 2005	Kitt Peak	Spacewatch	·	2.2 km	MPC · JPL
657496	2016 QE_{133}	—	August 30, 2016	Mount Lemmon	Mount Lemmon Survey	·	1.5 km	MPC · JPL
657497	2016 QH_{141}	—	April 8, 2008	Mount Lemmon	Mount Lemmon Survey	VER	1.9 km	MPC · JPL
657498	2016 QA_{142}	—	August 26, 2016	Haleakala	Pan-STARRS 1	·	2.5 km	MPC · JPL
657499	2016 QF_{149}	—	August 30, 2016	Haleakala	Pan-STARRS 1	EOS	1.6 km	MPC · JPL
657500	2016 QK_{149}	—	August 30, 2016	Haleakala	Pan-STARRS 1	THB	2.3 km	MPC · JPL

== 657501–657600 ==
back to top

Designation			Discovery			Properties		Ref
Permanent	Provisional	Named after	Date	Site	Discoverer(s)	Category	Diam.	Ref
657501	2016 RN_{4}	—	August 12, 2016	Haleakala	Pan-STARRS 1	EOS	1.6 km	MPC · JPL
657502	2016 RC_{5}	—	January 22, 2013	Mount Lemmon	Mount Lemmon Survey	·	2.7 km	MPC · JPL
657503	2016 RH_{5}	—	July 31, 2005	Palomar	NEAT	·	2.8 km	MPC · JPL
657504	2016 RJ_{5}	—	July 9, 2016	Haleakala	Pan-STARRS 1	EOS	1.3 km	MPC · JPL
657505	2016 RT_{5}	—	April 19, 2015	Mount Lemmon	Mount Lemmon Survey	·	2.7 km	MPC · JPL
657506	2016 RZ_{5}	—	January 16, 2013	Haleakala	Pan-STARRS 1	·	1.7 km	MPC · JPL
657507	2016 RX_{7}	—	November 20, 2007	Mount Lemmon	Mount Lemmon Survey	·	820 m	MPC · JPL
657508	2016 RC_{11}	—	August 19, 2006	Kitt Peak	Spacewatch	·	540 m	MPC · JPL
657509	2016 RR_{11}	—	September 20, 2003	Palomar	NEAT	·	500 m	MPC · JPL
657510	2016 RJ_{12}	—	July 11, 2016	Haleakala	Pan-STARRS 1	·	2.2 km	MPC · JPL
657511	2016 RX_{13}	—	April 7, 2007	Mount Lemmon	Mount Lemmon Survey	·	890 m	MPC · JPL
657512	2016 RM_{14}	—	August 3, 2016	Haleakala	Pan-STARRS 1	·	2.4 km	MPC · JPL
657513	2016 RV_{15}	—	October 19, 2006	Catalina	CSS	·	610 m	MPC · JPL
657514	2016 RV_{16}	—	March 6, 2008	Mount Lemmon	Mount Lemmon Survey	·	2.7 km	MPC · JPL
657515	2016 RP_{23}	—	August 30, 2016	Haleakala	Pan-STARRS 1	·	1.4 km	MPC · JPL
657516	2016 RA_{24}	—	September 6, 2016	Mount Lemmon	Mount Lemmon Survey	·	1.8 km	MPC · JPL
657517	2016 RG_{26}	—	October 15, 2006	Kitt Peak	Spacewatch	·	570 m	MPC · JPL
657518	2016 RO_{32}	—	October 1, 2005	Mount Lemmon	Mount Lemmon Survey	·	2.6 km	MPC · JPL
657519	2016 RC_{35}	—	November 13, 2007	Mount Lemmon	Mount Lemmon Survey	·	840 m	MPC · JPL
657520	2016 RB_{36}	—	October 3, 2005	Kitt Peak	Spacewatch	·	2.4 km	MPC · JPL
657521	2016 RC_{37}	—	November 5, 2007	Mount Lemmon	Mount Lemmon Survey	·	670 m	MPC · JPL
657522	2016 RK_{37}	—	August 19, 2006	Kitt Peak	Spacewatch	·	2.0 km	MPC · JPL
657523	2016 RX_{37}	—	September 1, 2005	Palomar	NEAT	·	3.0 km	MPC · JPL
657524	2016 RB_{39}	—	December 30, 2007	Mount Lemmon	Mount Lemmon Survey	EOS	1.7 km	MPC · JPL
657525	2016 RX_{39}	—	October 23, 2005	Catalina	CSS	TIR	2.8 km	MPC · JPL
657526	2016 RY_{39}	—	September 24, 2009	Mount Lemmon	Mount Lemmon Survey	·	530 m	MPC · JPL
657527	2016 RT_{41}	—	September 30, 2005	Kitt Peak	Spacewatch	·	2.3 km	MPC · JPL
657528	2016 RM_{43}	—	September 2, 2016	Mount Lemmon	Mount Lemmon Survey	·	2.4 km	MPC · JPL
657529	2016 RJ_{44}	—	September 12, 2016	Mount Lemmon	Mount Lemmon Survey	·	2.1 km	MPC · JPL
657530	2016 RW_{46}	—	December 8, 2012	Mount Lemmon	Mount Lemmon Survey	·	1.4 km	MPC · JPL
657531	2016 RC_{47}	—	February 13, 2002	Kitt Peak	Spacewatch	·	640 m	MPC · JPL
657532	2016 RE_{50}	—	September 12, 2016	Haleakala	Pan-STARRS 1	EOS	1.5 km	MPC · JPL
657533	2016 RT_{54}	—	September 10, 2016	Mount Lemmon	Mount Lemmon Survey	·	500 m	MPC · JPL
657534	2016 RZ_{57}	—	September 4, 2016	Mount Lemmon	Mount Lemmon Survey	·	2.8 km	MPC · JPL
657535	2016 RF_{60}	—	September 10, 2016	Mount Lemmon	Mount Lemmon Survey	·	690 m	MPC · JPL
657536	2016 RS_{60}	—	September 12, 2016	Haleakala	Pan-STARRS 1	·	1.7 km	MPC · JPL
657537	2016 RS_{66}	—	September 8, 2016	Haleakala	Pan-STARRS 1	EOS	1.4 km	MPC · JPL
657538	2016 RQ_{70}	—	September 8, 2016	Haleakala	Pan-STARRS 1	·	1.8 km	MPC · JPL
657539	2016 RQ_{76}	—	September 12, 2016	Haleakala	Pan-STARRS 1	EOS	1.5 km	MPC · JPL
657540	2016 RV_{80}	—	September 10, 2016	Mount Lemmon	Mount Lemmon Survey	·	2.4 km	MPC · JPL
657541	2016 RN_{81}	—	September 12, 2016	Haleakala	Pan-STARRS 1	EOS	1.4 km	MPC · JPL
657542	2016 RE_{83}	—	September 10, 2016	Mount Lemmon	Mount Lemmon Survey	·	2.1 km	MPC · JPL
657543	2016 RO_{87}	—	September 6, 2016	Mount Lemmon	Mount Lemmon Survey	·	2.0 km	MPC · JPL
657544	2016 RF_{88}	—	February 28, 2008	Mount Lemmon	Mount Lemmon Survey	EOS	1.6 km	MPC · JPL
657545	2016 SJ_{4}	—	September 30, 2005	Palomar	NEAT	·	1.5 km	MPC · JPL
657546	2016 SA_{5}	—	December 31, 2007	Kitt Peak	Spacewatch	·	2.1 km	MPC · JPL
657547	2016 SS_{5}	—	September 19, 2016	Haleakala	Pan-STARRS 1	·	3.1 km	MPC · JPL
657548	2016 SP_{8}	—	September 19, 2003	Palomar	NEAT	·	560 m	MPC · JPL
657549	2016 SV_{8}	—	October 25, 2005	Catalina	CSS	·	2.9 km	MPC · JPL
657550	2016 SA_{12}	—	December 31, 2013	Mount Lemmon	Mount Lemmon Survey	·	520 m	MPC · JPL
657551	2016 SN_{12}	—	August 18, 2006	Kitt Peak	Spacewatch	·	550 m	MPC · JPL
657552	2016 SE_{13}	—	September 6, 2008	Mount Lemmon	Mount Lemmon Survey	·	1.4 km	MPC · JPL
657553	2016 SR_{13}	—	September 20, 2003	Kitt Peak	Spacewatch	·	730 m	MPC · JPL
657554	2016 SO_{15}	—	April 15, 2012	Haleakala	Pan-STARRS 1	·	580 m	MPC · JPL
657555	2016 SB_{16}	—	September 29, 1973	Palomar	C. J. van Houten, I. van Houten-Groeneveld, T. Gehrels	(1547)	1.5 km	MPC · JPL
657556	2016 SC_{18}	—	October 23, 2006	Mount Lemmon	Mount Lemmon Survey	EOS	1.8 km	MPC · JPL
657557	2016 SD_{18}	—	August 14, 2016	Haleakala	Pan-STARRS 1	·	580 m	MPC · JPL
657558	2016 SY_{18}	—	February 24, 2014	Haleakala	Pan-STARRS 1	·	1.6 km	MPC · JPL
657559	2016 SZ_{19}	—	September 13, 2005	Kitt Peak	Spacewatch	HYG	2.2 km	MPC · JPL
657560	2016 SB_{21}	—	August 23, 2003	Palomar	NEAT	·	1.7 km	MPC · JPL
657561	2016 ST_{21}	—	May 21, 2012	Haleakala	Pan-STARRS 1	·	720 m	MPC · JPL
657562	2016 SL_{23}	—	September 25, 2006	Kitt Peak	Spacewatch	·	520 m	MPC · JPL
657563	2016 SF_{24}	—	August 2, 2016	Haleakala	Pan-STARRS 1	·	650 m	MPC · JPL
657564	2016 SV_{24}	—	August 30, 2002	Palomar	NEAT	·	500 m	MPC · JPL
657565	2016 SM_{27}	—	October 17, 2001	Palomar	NEAT	·	2.3 km	MPC · JPL
657566	2016 SP_{27}	—	October 23, 2006	Mount Lemmon	Mount Lemmon Survey	·	610 m	MPC · JPL
657567	2016 SO_{28}	—	August 19, 2009	Kitt Peak	Spacewatch	·	630 m	MPC · JPL
657568	2016 SJ_{30}	—	March 11, 2008	Mount Lemmon	Mount Lemmon Survey	·	2.4 km	MPC · JPL
657569	2016 SZ_{30}	—	September 25, 2016	Haleakala	Pan-STARRS 1	·	2.5 km	MPC · JPL
657570	2016 SD_{33}	—	October 10, 2007	Mount Lemmon	Mount Lemmon Survey	·	1.6 km	MPC · JPL
657571	2016 SK_{33}	—	October 23, 1995	Kitt Peak	Spacewatch	V	470 m	MPC · JPL
657572	2016 SV_{33}	—	November 12, 2005	Kitt Peak	Spacewatch	EOS	1.8 km	MPC · JPL
657573	2016 SB_{37}	—	February 5, 2013	Kitt Peak	Spacewatch	·	2.6 km	MPC · JPL
657574	2016 SV_{37}	—	December 29, 2011	Mount Lemmon	Mount Lemmon Survey	·	2.3 km	MPC · JPL
657575	2016 SN_{38}	—	October 4, 1999	Kitt Peak	Spacewatch	THM	1.9 km	MPC · JPL
657576	2016 SP_{38}	—	April 24, 2012	Haleakala	Pan-STARRS 1	·	560 m	MPC · JPL
657577	2016 SZ_{38}	—	September 30, 2016	Haleakala	Pan-STARRS 1	URS	2.2 km	MPC · JPL
657578	2016 SU_{41}	—	May 1, 2009	Kitt Peak	Spacewatch	·	490 m	MPC · JPL
657579	2016 SW_{43}	—	August 28, 2009	Kitt Peak	Spacewatch	·	630 m	MPC · JPL
657580	2016 SN_{44}	—	May 14, 2005	Mount Lemmon	Mount Lemmon Survey	·	630 m	MPC · JPL
657581	2016 SW_{44}	—	September 11, 2016	Mount Lemmon	Mount Lemmon Survey	·	600 m	MPC · JPL
657582	2016 SY_{44}	—	October 27, 1995	Kitt Peak	Spacewatch	(5)	1.5 km	MPC · JPL
657583	2016 SE_{45}	—	October 2, 2005	Palomar	NEAT	·	3.0 km	MPC · JPL
657584	2016 SW_{45}	—	September 19, 2003	Kitt Peak	Spacewatch	·	510 m	MPC · JPL
657585	2016 SG_{46}	—	March 4, 2005	Mount Lemmon	Mount Lemmon Survey	·	600 m	MPC · JPL
657586	2016 SZ_{49}	—	September 24, 2011	Haleakala	Pan-STARRS 1	·	1.5 km	MPC · JPL
657587	2016 SU_{53}	—	September 1, 2005	Kitt Peak	Spacewatch	EOS	1.5 km	MPC · JPL
657588	2016 SJ_{54}	—	October 14, 2010	Mount Lemmon	Mount Lemmon Survey	·	3.6 km	MPC · JPL
657589	2016 SD_{59}	—	September 30, 2016	Haleakala	Pan-STARRS 1	HNS	1.2 km	MPC · JPL
657590	2016 SS_{68}	—	February 28, 2008	Mount Lemmon	Mount Lemmon Survey	·	480 m	MPC · JPL
657591	2016 SL_{74}	—	September 22, 2016	Mount Lemmon	Mount Lemmon Survey	·	2.1 km	MPC · JPL
657592	2016 SR_{74}	—	September 30, 2016	Haleakala	Pan-STARRS 1	·	2.3 km	MPC · JPL
657593	2016 SU_{74}	—	September 26, 2016	Haleakala	Pan-STARRS 1	·	2.1 km	MPC · JPL
657594	2016 SH_{76}	—	September 26, 2016	Haleakala	Pan-STARRS 1	·	1.9 km	MPC · JPL
657595	2016 SO_{76}	—	September 27, 2016	Haleakala	Pan-STARRS 1	·	2.5 km	MPC · JPL
657596	2016 SV_{80}	—	September 26, 2016	XuYi	PMO NEO Survey Program	·	520 m	MPC · JPL
657597	2016 SX_{81}	—	September 27, 2016	Haleakala	Pan-STARRS 1	·	1.9 km	MPC · JPL
657598	2016 SM_{87}	—	September 22, 2016	Mount Lemmon	Mount Lemmon Survey	·	2.4 km	MPC · JPL
657599	2016 SW_{93}	—	September 26, 2016	Haleakala	Pan-STARRS 1	EOS	1.4 km	MPC · JPL
657600	2016 SC_{94}	—	September 26, 2016	Haleakala	Pan-STARRS 1	URS	2.4 km	MPC · JPL

== 657601–657700 ==
back to top

Designation			Discovery			Properties		Ref
Permanent	Provisional	Named after	Date	Site	Discoverer(s)	Category	Diam.	Ref
657601	2016 SO_{95}	—	April 8, 2003	Kitt Peak	Spacewatch	EOS	1.7 km	MPC · JPL
657602	2016 SO_{100}	—	September 25, 2016	Mount Lemmon	Mount Lemmon Survey	·	2.2 km	MPC · JPL
657603	2016 SN_{119}	—	September 25, 2016	Haleakala	Pan-STARRS 1	·	2.5 km	MPC · JPL
657604	2016 TU_{3}	—	August 29, 2006	Catalina	CSS	·	660 m	MPC · JPL
657605	2016 TN_{6}	—	March 21, 2015	Mount Lemmon	Mount Lemmon Survey	·	790 m	MPC · JPL
657606	2016 TC_{13}	—	October 3, 2006	Mount Lemmon	Mount Lemmon Survey	·	630 m	MPC · JPL
657607	2016 TO_{15}	—	November 5, 2012	ASC-Kislovodsk	ASC-Kislovodsk	(194)	2.3 km	MPC · JPL
657608	2016 TH_{21}	—	October 26, 2011	Haleakala	Pan-STARRS 1	·	2.6 km	MPC · JPL
657609	2016 TT_{23}	—	August 28, 2009	Catalina	CSS	(2076)	600 m	MPC · JPL
657610	2016 TY_{23}	—	March 24, 2006	Mount Lemmon	Mount Lemmon Survey	·	1.9 km	MPC · JPL
657611	2016 TN_{29}	—	September 27, 2016	Mount Lemmon	Mount Lemmon Survey	·	600 m	MPC · JPL
657612	2016 TJ_{30}	—	August 29, 2016	Mount Lemmon	Mount Lemmon Survey	·	1.0 km	MPC · JPL
657613	2016 TV_{31}	—	February 8, 2011	Mount Lemmon	Mount Lemmon Survey	·	490 m	MPC · JPL
657614	2016 TQ_{32}	—	June 18, 2015	Haleakala	Pan-STARRS 1	·	2.8 km	MPC · JPL
657615	2016 TQ_{35}	—	October 15, 2006	Kitt Peak	Spacewatch	·	620 m	MPC · JPL
657616	2016 TB_{40}	—	September 26, 2006	Kitt Peak	Spacewatch	·	520 m	MPC · JPL
657617	2016 TC_{40}	—	November 1, 2011	Kitt Peak	Spacewatch	EOS	1.5 km	MPC · JPL
657618	2016 TP_{40}	—	January 10, 2013	Haleakala	Pan-STARRS 1	·	2.2 km	MPC · JPL
657619	2016 TR_{41}	—	February 15, 2013	Haleakala	Pan-STARRS 1	·	2.4 km	MPC · JPL
657620	2016 TY_{41}	—	January 1, 2014	Haleakala	Pan-STARRS 1	·	530 m	MPC · JPL
657621	2016 TB_{47}	—	September 14, 2009	Kitt Peak	Spacewatch	·	480 m	MPC · JPL
657622	2016 TX_{47}	—	November 3, 2011	Mayhill-ISON	L. Elenin	·	1.4 km	MPC · JPL
657623	2016 TZ_{47}	—	October 7, 2016	Mount Lemmon	Mount Lemmon Survey	·	560 m	MPC · JPL
657624	2016 TU_{49}	—	May 4, 2002	Kitt Peak	Spacewatch	·	3.5 km	MPC · JPL
657625	2016 TR_{59}	—	September 17, 2003	Kitt Peak	Spacewatch	·	490 m	MPC · JPL
657626	2016 TT_{62}	—	February 28, 2008	Kitt Peak	Spacewatch	V	550 m	MPC · JPL
657627	2016 TV_{63}	—	September 22, 2003	Kitt Peak	Spacewatch	·	580 m	MPC · JPL
657628	2016 TM_{67}	—	August 12, 2004	Cerro Tololo	Deep Ecliptic Survey	·	3.1 km	MPC · JPL
657629	2016 TZ_{70}	—	September 15, 2006	Kitt Peak	Spacewatch	·	600 m	MPC · JPL
657630	2016 TL_{71}	—	October 3, 2006	Mount Lemmon	Mount Lemmon Survey	·	580 m	MPC · JPL
657631	2016 TD_{72}	—	August 18, 2010	Tenerife	ESA OGS	·	2.6 km	MPC · JPL
657632	2016 TB_{76}	—	October 2, 2016	Mount Lemmon	Mount Lemmon Survey	·	550 m	MPC · JPL
657633	2016 TG_{76}	—	October 2, 2016	Mount Lemmon	Mount Lemmon Survey	PHO	740 m	MPC · JPL
657634	2016 TZ_{77}	—	September 16, 2002	Palomar	NEAT	·	490 m	MPC · JPL
657635	2016 TS_{79}	—	October 26, 2009	Mount Lemmon	Mount Lemmon Survey	·	850 m	MPC · JPL
657636	2016 TG_{84}	—	January 19, 2001	Kitt Peak	Spacewatch	·	3.1 km	MPC · JPL
657637	2016 TE_{86}	—	October 10, 2016	Mount Lemmon	Mount Lemmon Survey	·	2.4 km	MPC · JPL
657638	2016 TJ_{86}	—	August 12, 2012	Siding Spring	SSS	PHO	860 m	MPC · JPL
657639	2016 TG_{93}	—	April 2, 2005	Kitt Peak	Spacewatch	·	720 m	MPC · JPL
657640	2016 TU_{100}	—	February 16, 2007	Catalina	CSS	LIX	3.0 km	MPC · JPL
657641	2016 TR_{102}	—	October 11, 2016	Mount Lemmon	Mount Lemmon Survey	·	2.5 km	MPC · JPL
657642	2016 TX_{106}	—	September 20, 2009	Mount Lemmon	Mount Lemmon Survey	·	590 m	MPC · JPL
657643	2016 TH_{132}	—	October 9, 2016	Haleakala	Pan-STARRS 1	·	1.7 km	MPC · JPL
657644	2016 TH_{134}	—	October 10, 2016	Haleakala	Pan-STARRS 1	·	2.5 km	MPC · JPL
657645	2016 TT_{134}	—	October 6, 2016	Haleakala	Pan-STARRS 1	·	2.4 km	MPC · JPL
657646	2016 TG_{151}	—	October 6, 2016	Haleakala	Pan-STARRS 1	·	2.3 km	MPC · JPL
657647	2016 TV_{152}	—	October 12, 2016	Haleakala	Pan-STARRS 1	·	960 m	MPC · JPL
657648	2016 TB_{162}	—	October 8, 2016	Haleakala	Pan-STARRS 1	·	2.4 km	MPC · JPL
657649	2016 TT_{163}	—	October 6, 2016	Haleakala	Pan-STARRS 1	·	470 m	MPC · JPL
657650	2016 TW_{169}	—	October 8, 2016	Haleakala	Pan-STARRS 1	·	2.3 km	MPC · JPL
657651	2016 TQ_{178}	—	October 8, 2016	Haleakala	Pan-STARRS 1	·	2.6 km	MPC · JPL
657652	2016 TQ_{189}	—	October 7, 2016	Haleakala	Pan-STARRS 1	·	510 m	MPC · JPL
657653	2016 TN_{195}	—	April 11, 2008	Kitt Peak	Spacewatch	·	2.9 km	MPC · JPL
657654	2016 TZ_{199}	—	November 17, 2009	Mount Lemmon	Mount Lemmon Survey	·	520 m	MPC · JPL
657655	2016 UB	—	June 28, 2009	Siding Spring	SSS	·	910 m	MPC · JPL
657656	2016 UX	—	September 12, 2009	Kitt Peak	Spacewatch	·	510 m	MPC · JPL
657657	2016 UQ_{1}	—	July 22, 2001	Palomar	NEAT	·	1.2 km	MPC · JPL
657658	2016 UM_{2}	—	November 21, 2006	Mount Lemmon	Mount Lemmon Survey	·	700 m	MPC · JPL
657659	2016 UF_{4}	—	November 22, 2006	Kitt Peak	Spacewatch	·	530 m	MPC · JPL
657660	2016 UK_{6}	—	October 13, 2016	Mount Lemmon	Mount Lemmon Survey	V	510 m	MPC · JPL
657661	2016 UR_{8}	—	December 2, 2005	Kitt Peak	Spacewatch	·	2.9 km	MPC · JPL
657662	2016 UT_{8}	—	September 4, 2003	Kitt Peak	Spacewatch	·	3.2 km	MPC · JPL
657663	2016 UQ_{10}	—	October 24, 2009	Kitt Peak	Spacewatch	·	620 m	MPC · JPL
657664	2016 UG_{14}	—	February 6, 2014	Mount Lemmon	Mount Lemmon Survey	·	600 m	MPC · JPL
657665	2016 UR_{14}	—	August 11, 2007	Siding Spring	SSS	·	1.4 km	MPC · JPL
657666	2016 UD_{15}	—	September 17, 2003	Palomar	NEAT	·	1.3 km	MPC · JPL
657667	2016 UW_{15}	—	September 18, 2006	Kitt Peak	Spacewatch	·	580 m	MPC · JPL
657668	2016 UB_{16}	—	November 24, 2011	Mount Lemmon	Mount Lemmon Survey	·	2.7 km	MPC · JPL
657669	2016 UW_{16}	—	November 4, 2005	Mount Lemmon	Mount Lemmon Survey	URS	2.5 km	MPC · JPL
657670	2016 UU_{18}	—	July 28, 2015	Haleakala	Pan-STARRS 1	VER	2.4 km	MPC · JPL
657671	2016 UZ_{19}	—	September 5, 2016	Mount Lemmon	Mount Lemmon Survey	·	2.3 km	MPC · JPL
657672	2016 UT_{20}	—	March 23, 2001	Haleakala	NEAT	·	1.9 km	MPC · JPL
657673	2016 UN_{21}	—	October 30, 2005	Kitt Peak	Spacewatch	·	2.4 km	MPC · JPL
657674	2016 UC_{22}	—	October 20, 2006	Kitt Peak	Spacewatch	·	520 m	MPC · JPL
657675	2016 US_{23}	—	August 6, 2005	Palomar	NEAT	·	630 m	MPC · JPL
657676	2016 UP_{25}	—	August 29, 2016	Mount Lemmon	Mount Lemmon Survey	·	1.5 km	MPC · JPL
657677	2016 UY_{26}	—	May 29, 2011	Mayhill-ISON	L. Elenin	JUN	1.0 km	MPC · JPL
657678	2016 UO_{27}	—	October 22, 2003	Apache Point	SDSS Collaboration	·	600 m	MPC · JPL
657679	2016 UQ_{31}	—	September 22, 2003	Palomar	NEAT	·	650 m	MPC · JPL
657680	2016 US_{32}	—	November 21, 2005	Catalina	CSS	·	3.3 km	MPC · JPL
657681	2016 UK_{40}	—	November 6, 2005	Mount Lemmon	Mount Lemmon Survey	·	3.2 km	MPC · JPL
657682	2016 UJ_{42}	—	April 18, 2009	Kitt Peak	Spacewatch	·	570 m	MPC · JPL
657683	2016 UX_{42}	—	September 30, 2010	Mount Lemmon	Mount Lemmon Survey	·	2.7 km	MPC · JPL
657684	2016 UT_{43}	—	September 22, 2009	Mount Lemmon	Mount Lemmon Survey	·	680 m	MPC · JPL
657685	2016 UL_{44}	—	June 10, 2015	Haleakala	Pan-STARRS 1	·	2.8 km	MPC · JPL
657686	2016 UM_{44}	—	February 15, 2013	Haleakala	Pan-STARRS 1	·	2.6 km	MPC · JPL
657687	2016 UX_{44}	—	December 14, 2004	Kitt Peak	Spacewatch	(5)	1.1 km	MPC · JPL
657688	2016 UL_{49}	—	September 29, 2005	Kitt Peak	Spacewatch	·	2.3 km	MPC · JPL
657689	2016 US_{57}	—	August 20, 2006	Palomar	NEAT	·	620 m	MPC · JPL
657690	2016 UP_{58}	—	September 20, 2006	Kitt Peak	Spacewatch	·	530 m	MPC · JPL
657691	2016 UF_{60}	—	October 2, 2006	Mount Lemmon	Mount Lemmon Survey	·	610 m	MPC · JPL
657692	2016 UT_{67}	—	March 4, 2008	Mount Lemmon	Mount Lemmon Survey	·	2.0 km	MPC · JPL
657693	2016 UM_{68}	—	September 20, 2003	Kitt Peak	Spacewatch	·	540 m	MPC · JPL
657694	2016 UR_{70}	—	March 11, 2008	Kitt Peak	Spacewatch	·	470 m	MPC · JPL
657695	2016 UC_{74}	—	October 10, 2008	Mount Lemmon	Mount Lemmon Survey	3:2	3.4 km	MPC · JPL
657696	2016 UH_{75}	—	October 23, 2003	Kitt Peak	Deep Ecliptic Survey	·	670 m	MPC · JPL
657697	2016 UO_{75}	—	June 4, 2005	Kitt Peak	Spacewatch	·	650 m	MPC · JPL
657698	2016 UW_{76}	—	June 16, 2012	Haleakala	Pan-STARRS 1	·	910 m	MPC · JPL
657699	2016 UM_{77}	—	March 4, 2011	Kitt Peak	Spacewatch	·	610 m	MPC · JPL
657700	2016 UW_{77}	—	May 24, 2007	Mount Lemmon	Mount Lemmon Survey	MAS	680 m	MPC · JPL

== 657701–657800 ==
back to top

Designation			Discovery			Properties		Ref
Permanent	Provisional	Named after	Date	Site	Discoverer(s)	Category	Diam.	Ref
657701	2016 UN_{79}	—	February 10, 2007	Mount Lemmon	Mount Lemmon Survey	·	740 m	MPC · JPL
657702	2016 UM_{84}	—	March 11, 2008	Kitt Peak	Spacewatch	·	490 m	MPC · JPL
657703	2016 UC_{87}	—	October 1, 1995	Kitt Peak	Spacewatch	·	530 m	MPC · JPL
657704	2016 UC_{90}	—	March 31, 2013	Mount Lemmon	Mount Lemmon Survey	THM	1.9 km	MPC · JPL
657705	2016 UN_{94}	—	October 19, 1995	Kitt Peak	Spacewatch	V	490 m	MPC · JPL
657706	2016 UM_{96}	—	November 7, 2007	Mount Lemmon	Mount Lemmon Survey	AEO	680 m	MPC · JPL
657707	2016 UN_{99}	—	September 23, 2006	Kitt Peak	Spacewatch	·	470 m	MPC · JPL
657708	2016 UL_{100}	—	October 12, 2016	Mount Lemmon	Mount Lemmon Survey	·	2.1 km	MPC · JPL
657709	2016 UK_{103}	—	April 5, 2014	Haleakala	Pan-STARRS 1	EOS	1.3 km	MPC · JPL
657710	2016 UK_{104}	—	April 14, 2008	Mount Lemmon	Mount Lemmon Survey	V	410 m	MPC · JPL
657711	2016 UC_{105}	—	March 29, 2011	XuYi	PMO NEO Survey Program	·	670 m	MPC · JPL
657712	2016 UJ_{105}	—	October 26, 2016	Haleakala	Pan-STARRS 1	·	1.6 km	MPC · JPL
657713	2016 UY_{105}	—	October 27, 2016	Mount Lemmon	Mount Lemmon Survey	·	390 m	MPC · JPL
657714	2016 UM_{106}	—	November 18, 2006	Kitt Peak	Spacewatch	·	570 m	MPC · JPL
657715	2016 UW_{108}	—	April 4, 2005	Mount Lemmon	Mount Lemmon Survey	·	540 m	MPC · JPL
657716	2016 UZ_{110}	—	October 20, 2016	Mount Lemmon	Mount Lemmon Survey	VER	2.0 km	MPC · JPL
657717	2016 UX_{112}	—	December 31, 2007	Kitt Peak	Spacewatch	·	530 m	MPC · JPL
657718	2016 UA_{116}	—	October 21, 2016	Mount Lemmon	Mount Lemmon Survey	·	2.2 km	MPC · JPL
657719	2016 UL_{117}	—	October 23, 2006	Kitt Peak	Spacewatch	·	460 m	MPC · JPL
657720	2016 UF_{120}	—	May 20, 2012	Haleakala	Pan-STARRS 1	·	530 m	MPC · JPL
657721	2016 UJ_{122}	—	April 5, 2003	Kitt Peak	Spacewatch	·	2.1 km	MPC · JPL
657722	2016 UQ_{123}	—	October 27, 2005	Kitt Peak	Spacewatch	·	2.2 km	MPC · JPL
657723	2016 UT_{131}	—	February 10, 2008	Kitt Peak	Spacewatch	·	2.4 km	MPC · JPL
657724	2016 UB_{133}	—	October 27, 2016	Haleakala	Pan-STARRS 1	LIX	2.9 km	MPC · JPL
657725	2016 UM_{144}	—	August 27, 2016	Haleakala	Pan-STARRS 1	THM	1.6 km	MPC · JPL
657726	2016 UP_{144}	—	October 19, 2003	Kitt Peak	Spacewatch	·	1.7 km	MPC · JPL
657727	2016 UL_{147}	—	October 4, 2016	Mount Lemmon	Mount Lemmon Survey	·	390 m	MPC · JPL
657728	2016 UB_{148}	—	November 19, 2012	Nogales	M. Schwartz, P. R. Holvorcem	EUN	1.6 km	MPC · JPL
657729	2016 UA_{149}	—	November 22, 2006	Mount Lemmon	Mount Lemmon Survey	V	600 m	MPC · JPL
657730	2016 UF_{172}	—	March 18, 2018	Haleakala	Pan-STARRS 1	·	420 m	MPC · JPL
657731	2016 UN_{175}	—	January 20, 2014	Mount Lemmon	Mount Lemmon Survey	·	360 m	MPC · JPL
657732	2016 UB_{204}	—	March 11, 2005	Kitt Peak	Spacewatch	·	500 m	MPC · JPL
657733	2016 UW_{204}	—	April 6, 2008	Mount Lemmon	Mount Lemmon Survey	·	470 m	MPC · JPL
657734	2016 UJ_{265}	—	October 26, 2016	Mount Lemmon	Mount Lemmon Survey	URS	3.1 km	MPC · JPL
657735	2016 UL_{265}	—	October 31, 2016	Mount Lemmon	Mount Lemmon Survey	NYS	770 m	MPC · JPL
657736	2016 UO_{269}	—	October 21, 2016	Mount Lemmon	Mount Lemmon Survey	·	2.4 km	MPC · JPL
657737	2016 UF_{270}	—	October 21, 2016	Mount Lemmon	Mount Lemmon Survey	·	2.4 km	MPC · JPL
657738	2016 UH_{270}	—	October 25, 2016	Haleakala	Pan-STARRS 1	·	2.3 km	MPC · JPL
657739	2016 UT_{270}	—	June 26, 2015	Haleakala	Pan-STARRS 1	·	2.2 km	MPC · JPL
657740	2016 VD_{10}	—	February 25, 2011	Mount Lemmon	Mount Lemmon Survey	·	370 m	MPC · JPL
657741	2016 VM_{14}	—	November 5, 1999	Kitt Peak	Spacewatch	·	480 m	MPC · JPL
657742	2016 VH_{15}	—	December 6, 2012	Mount Lemmon	Mount Lemmon Survey	·	2.8 km	MPC · JPL
657743	2016 VW_{17}	—	June 5, 2016	Haleakala	Pan-STARRS 1	EUP	2.9 km	MPC · JPL
657744	2016 VX_{20}	—	October 1, 2015	Mount Lemmon	Mount Lemmon Survey	THB	2.8 km	MPC · JPL
657745	2016 VQ_{29}	—	November 4, 2016	Haleakala	Pan-STARRS 1	·	1.1 km	MPC · JPL
657746	2016 VO_{34}	—	November 10, 2016	Haleakala	Pan-STARRS 1	·	890 m	MPC · JPL
657747	2016 VD_{35}	—	November 9, 2016	Mount Lemmon	Mount Lemmon Survey	MAR	1.2 km	MPC · JPL
657748	2016 VX_{35}	—	November 10, 2016	Mount Lemmon	Mount Lemmon Survey	·	1.5 km	MPC · JPL
657749	2016 VF_{43}	—	November 3, 2016	Haleakala	Pan-STARRS 1	·	920 m	MPC · JPL
657750	2016 VF_{51}	—	November 5, 2016	Haleakala	Pan-STARRS 1	·	2.6 km	MPC · JPL
657751	2016 VG_{51}	—	November 8, 2016	Mount Lemmon	Mount Lemmon Survey	·	3.4 km	MPC · JPL
657752	2016 WZ	—	October 13, 2016	Mount Lemmon	Mount Lemmon Survey	PHO	940 m	MPC · JPL
657753	2016 WX_{6}	—	March 13, 2007	Kitt Peak	Spacewatch	·	910 m	MPC · JPL
657754	2016 WR_{13}	—	July 3, 2005	Palomar	NEAT	·	870 m	MPC · JPL
657755	2016 WM_{16}	—	December 1, 2005	Kitt Peak	Wasserman, L. H., Millis, R. L.	·	1.1 km	MPC · JPL
657756	2016 WP_{16}	—	September 13, 2005	Catalina	CSS	·	1.0 km	MPC · JPL
657757	2016 WV_{16}	—	October 26, 2016	Mount Lemmon	Mount Lemmon Survey	·	2.0 km	MPC · JPL
657758	2016 WM_{18}	—	November 24, 2003	Kitt Peak	Deep Ecliptic Survey	·	590 m	MPC · JPL
657759	2016 WX_{24}	—	July 4, 2003	Kitt Peak	Spacewatch	·	2.0 km	MPC · JPL
657760	2016 WQ_{25}	—	November 20, 2016	Mount Lemmon	Mount Lemmon Survey	·	930 m	MPC · JPL
657761	2016 WJ_{29}	—	March 22, 2015	Haleakala	Pan-STARRS 1	·	930 m	MPC · JPL
657762	2016 WR_{33}	—	August 29, 2016	Mount Lemmon	Mount Lemmon Survey	·	780 m	MPC · JPL
657763	2016 WO_{38}	—	April 4, 2008	Kitt Peak	Spacewatch	·	730 m	MPC · JPL
657764	2016 WQ_{38}	—	May 5, 2008	Mount Lemmon	Mount Lemmon Survey	·	2.8 km	MPC · JPL
657765	2016 WY_{38}	—	September 30, 2006	Kitt Peak	Spacewatch	·	410 m	MPC · JPL
657766	2016 WZ_{41}	—	November 4, 2016	Haleakala	Pan-STARRS 1	·	670 m	MPC · JPL
657767	2016 WD_{46}	—	October 26, 2016	Mount Lemmon	Mount Lemmon Survey	·	680 m	MPC · JPL
657768	2016 WX_{49}	—	February 15, 2013	Haleakala	Pan-STARRS 1	·	1.7 km	MPC · JPL
657769	2016 WJ_{53}	—	November 3, 2016	Haleakala	Pan-STARRS 1	·	930 m	MPC · JPL
657770	2016 WC_{55}	—	July 2, 2003	Haleakala	NEAT	·	1.7 km	MPC · JPL
657771	2016 WM_{57}	—	December 11, 2013	Haleakala	Pan-STARRS 1	·	690 m	MPC · JPL
657772	2016 WX_{58}	—	November 20, 2016	Mount Lemmon	Mount Lemmon Survey	NYS	670 m	MPC · JPL
657773	2016 WO_{60}	—	October 23, 1995	Kitt Peak	Spacewatch	·	530 m	MPC · JPL
657774	2016 WQ_{60}	—	November 25, 2016	Mount Lemmon	Mount Lemmon Survey	PHO	850 m	MPC · JPL
657775	2016 WG_{63}	—	November 28, 2016	Haleakala	Pan-STARRS 1	·	900 m	MPC · JPL
657776	2016 WB_{74}	—	November 20, 2016	Mount Lemmon	Mount Lemmon Survey	·	780 m	MPC · JPL
657777	2016 XM_{4}	—	October 11, 2005	Uccle	T. Pauwels	·	2.5 km	MPC · JPL
657778	2016 XP_{4}	—	January 1, 2009	Mount Lemmon	Mount Lemmon Survey	(5)	1.1 km	MPC · JPL
657779	2016 XK_{5}	—	December 14, 2006	Kitt Peak	Spacewatch	·	690 m	MPC · JPL
657780	2016 XN_{9}	—	November 12, 2006	Mount Lemmon	Mount Lemmon Survey	KOR	1.1 km	MPC · JPL
657781	2016 XG_{10}	—	August 20, 2015	Kitt Peak	Spacewatch	·	1.6 km	MPC · JPL
657782	2016 XJ_{11}	—	July 19, 2015	Haleakala	Pan-STARRS 1	·	3.1 km	MPC · JPL
657783	2016 XN_{14}	—	October 2, 2005	Mount Lemmon	Mount Lemmon Survey	NYS	710 m	MPC · JPL
657784	2016 XD_{15}	—	February 26, 2014	Haleakala	Pan-STARRS 1	(2076)	580 m	MPC · JPL
657785	2016 XC_{19}	—	November 26, 2000	Kitt Peak	Spacewatch	T_{j} (2.93)	4.4 km	MPC · JPL
657786	2016 XM_{21}	—	January 20, 2014	Mount Lemmon	Mount Lemmon Survey	·	590 m	MPC · JPL
657787	2016 XS_{25}	—	October 7, 2012	Kitt Peak	Spacewatch	·	900 m	MPC · JPL
657788	2016 XQ_{32}	—	December 5, 2016	Mount Lemmon	Mount Lemmon Survey	·	850 m	MPC · JPL
657789	2016 XY_{38}	—	December 4, 2016	Mount Lemmon	Mount Lemmon Survey	·	620 m	MPC · JPL
657790	2016 YS_{1}	—	September 26, 2012	Mount Lemmon	Mount Lemmon Survey	·	980 m	MPC · JPL
657791	2016 YL_{2}	—	March 9, 2007	Kitt Peak	Spacewatch	·	2.5 km	MPC · JPL
657792	2016 YN_{11}	—	September 14, 2005	Catalina	CSS	·	1.9 km	MPC · JPL
657793	2016 YH_{12}	—	November 6, 2010	Mount Lemmon	Mount Lemmon Survey	·	2.4 km	MPC · JPL
657794	2016 YV_{12}	—	October 11, 2010	Mayhill-ISON	L. Elenin	·	2.4 km	MPC · JPL
657795	2016 YG_{13}	—	March 20, 2014	Haleakala	Pan-STARRS 1	MAR	1.4 km	MPC · JPL
657796	2016 YW_{13}	—	June 21, 2014	Haleakala	Pan-STARRS 1	·	1.3 km	MPC · JPL
657797	2016 YW_{17}	—	December 27, 2016	Mount Lemmon	Mount Lemmon Survey	·	790 m	MPC · JPL
657798	2016 YY_{19}	—	April 16, 2013	Haleakala	Pan-STARRS 1	·	1.3 km	MPC · JPL
657799	2016 YR_{31}	—	December 24, 2016	Mount Lemmon	Mount Lemmon Survey	·	1.1 km	MPC · JPL
657800	2017 AC_{7}	—	January 2, 2017	Oukaïmeden	M. Ory	·	690 m	MPC · JPL

== 657801–657900 ==
back to top

Designation			Discovery			Properties		Ref
Permanent	Provisional	Named after	Date	Site	Discoverer(s)	Category	Diam.	Ref
657801	2017 AB_{8}	—	January 28, 2003	Haleakala	NEAT	·	2.8 km	MPC · JPL
657802	2017 AL_{14}	—	December 27, 2016	Mount Lemmon	Mount Lemmon Survey	·	790 m	MPC · JPL
657803	2017 AH_{17}	—	August 4, 2005	Palomar	NEAT	·	620 m	MPC · JPL
657804	2017 AF_{19}	—	November 26, 2011	Mount Lemmon	Mount Lemmon Survey	·	2.2 km	MPC · JPL
657805	2017 AH_{19}	—	June 17, 2005	Mount Lemmon	Mount Lemmon Survey	·	730 m	MPC · JPL
657806	2017 AG_{20}	—	February 25, 2006	Catalina	CSS	EUP	3.9 km	MPC · JPL
657807	2017 AO_{21}	—	December 18, 2003	Kitt Peak	Spacewatch	H	430 m	MPC · JPL
657808	2017 AV_{24}	—	April 24, 2014	Mount Lemmon	Mount Lemmon Survey	·	750 m	MPC · JPL
657809	2017 AT_{26}	—	August 12, 2004	Cerro Tololo	Deep Ecliptic Survey	·	820 m	MPC · JPL
657810	2017 AV_{30}	—	January 5, 2017	Mount Lemmon	Mount Lemmon Survey	(2076)	570 m	MPC · JPL
657811	2017 AW_{32}	—	June 21, 2014	Mount Lemmon	Mount Lemmon Survey	·	1.3 km	MPC · JPL
657812	2017 AS_{33}	—	January 2, 2017	Haleakala	Pan-STARRS 1	·	930 m	MPC · JPL
657813	2017 AY_{40}	—	January 10, 2017	Haleakala	Pan-STARRS 1	·	1.4 km	MPC · JPL
657814	2017 AD_{42}	—	January 5, 2017	Mount Lemmon	Mount Lemmon Survey	·	2.0 km	MPC · JPL
657815	2017 AR_{43}	—	January 3, 2017	Haleakala	Pan-STARRS 1	·	820 m	MPC · JPL
657816	2017 AV_{44}	—	January 3, 2017	Haleakala	Pan-STARRS 1	·	3.0 km	MPC · JPL
657817	2017 BQ_{1}	—	January 10, 2003	Kitt Peak	Spacewatch	·	420 m	MPC · JPL
657818	2017 BV_{1}	—	March 25, 2012	Mount Lemmon	Mount Lemmon Survey	·	2.9 km	MPC · JPL
657819	2017 BW_{1}	—	March 18, 2013	Palomar	Palomar Transient Factory	·	1.4 km	MPC · JPL
657820	2017 BD_{4}	—	February 27, 2012	Haleakala	Pan-STARRS 1	LIX	3.6 km	MPC · JPL
657821	2017 BH_{5}	—	January 31, 2006	Kitt Peak	Spacewatch	NYS	840 m	MPC · JPL
657822	2017 BZ_{7}	—	February 11, 2004	Palomar	NEAT	·	1.9 km	MPC · JPL
657823	2017 BK_{8}	—	January 22, 2006	Catalina	CSS	·	900 m	MPC · JPL
657824	2017 BH_{9}	—	February 25, 2012	Catalina	CSS	H	480 m	MPC · JPL
657825	2017 BG_{10}	—	February 17, 2010	Kitt Peak	Spacewatch	NYS	700 m	MPC · JPL
657826	2017 BR_{12}	—	January 7, 2006	Mount Lemmon	Mount Lemmon Survey	NYS	1.2 km	MPC · JPL
657827	2017 BG_{14}	—	October 9, 2012	Mount Lemmon	Mount Lemmon Survey	·	490 m	MPC · JPL
657828	2017 BJ_{15}	—	January 22, 2006	Mount Lemmon	Mount Lemmon Survey	·	990 m	MPC · JPL
657829	2017 BL_{15}	—	November 16, 2006	Kitt Peak	Spacewatch	·	1.9 km	MPC · JPL
657830	2017 BO_{17}	—	December 11, 2012	Kitt Peak	Spacewatch	PHO	870 m	MPC · JPL
657831	2017 BD_{18}	—	November 15, 1995	Kitt Peak	Spacewatch	·	500 m	MPC · JPL
657832	2017 BF_{18}	—	September 25, 2012	Mount Lemmon	Mount Lemmon Survey	·	500 m	MPC · JPL
657833	2017 BK_{18}	—	January 26, 2017	Mount Lemmon	Mount Lemmon Survey	·	520 m	MPC · JPL
657834	2017 BT_{18}	—	October 20, 2008	Mount Lemmon	Mount Lemmon Survey	NYS	760 m	MPC · JPL
657835	2017 BB_{22}	—	October 1, 2008	Mount Lemmon	Mount Lemmon Survey	·	900 m	MPC · JPL
657836	2017 BM_{23}	—	January 10, 2013	Haleakala	Pan-STARRS 1	·	940 m	MPC · JPL
657837	2017 BE_{24}	—	October 22, 2012	Kitt Peak	Spacewatch	·	580 m	MPC · JPL
657838	2017 BE_{25}	—	March 29, 2014	Mount Lemmon	Mount Lemmon Survey	·	690 m	MPC · JPL
657839	2017 BG_{25}	—	April 10, 2010	Mount Lemmon	Mount Lemmon Survey	·	1.1 km	MPC · JPL
657840	2017 BF_{28}	—	March 28, 2008	Mount Lemmon	Mount Lemmon Survey	·	1.9 km	MPC · JPL
657841	2017 BB_{29}	—	January 23, 2006	Mount Lemmon	Mount Lemmon Survey	V	540 m	MPC · JPL
657842	2017 BH_{31}	—	February 2, 2004	Catalina	CSS	BAR	1.3 km	MPC · JPL
657843	2017 BQ_{38}	—	April 29, 2014	Haleakala	Pan-STARRS 1	·	1.3 km	MPC · JPL
657844	2017 BF_{39}	—	September 23, 2008	Kitt Peak	Spacewatch	·	790 m	MPC · JPL
657845	2017 BR_{41}	—	November 17, 2012	Kitt Peak	Spacewatch	NYS	950 m	MPC · JPL
657846	2017 BF_{44}	—	November 21, 2008	Kitt Peak	Spacewatch	·	1.2 km	MPC · JPL
657847	2017 BH_{44}	—	January 5, 2010	Kitt Peak	Spacewatch	·	490 m	MPC · JPL
657848	2017 BP_{51}	—	March 31, 2006	Piszkéstető	K. Sárneczky	MAS	600 m	MPC · JPL
657849	2017 BO_{59}	—	January 26, 2017	Haleakala	Pan-STARRS 1	·	900 m	MPC · JPL
657850	2017 BA_{60}	—	October 25, 2008	Mount Lemmon	Mount Lemmon Survey	·	750 m	MPC · JPL
657851	2017 BL_{62}	—	September 9, 2015	Haleakala	Pan-STARRS 1	·	960 m	MPC · JPL
657852	2017 BV_{67}	—	May 9, 2004	Kitt Peak	Spacewatch	·	670 m	MPC · JPL
657853	2017 BY_{70}	—	December 3, 2010	Mount Lemmon	Mount Lemmon Survey	·	2.1 km	MPC · JPL
657854	2017 BP_{72}	—	January 25, 2007	Kitt Peak	Spacewatch	·	610 m	MPC · JPL
657855	2017 BO_{79}	—	July 25, 2000	Kitt Peak	Spacewatch	MAS	700 m	MPC · JPL
657856	2017 BX_{79}	—	October 7, 2008	Mount Lemmon	Mount Lemmon Survey	·	850 m	MPC · JPL
657857	2017 BN_{81}	—	October 29, 2005	Palomar	NEAT	·	900 m	MPC · JPL
657858	2017 BJ_{85}	—	May 28, 2014	Mount Lemmon	Mount Lemmon Survey	·	650 m	MPC · JPL
657859	2017 BG_{88}	—	December 2, 2008	Mount Lemmon	Mount Lemmon Survey	T_{j} (2.96)	3.3 km	MPC · JPL
657860	2017 BM_{91}	—	December 31, 2008	Kitt Peak	Spacewatch	H	580 m	MPC · JPL
657861	2017 BZ_{94}	—	February 21, 2003	Palomar	NEAT	·	780 m	MPC · JPL
657862	2017 BR_{95}	—	June 1, 2003	Kitt Peak	Spacewatch	·	1.1 km	MPC · JPL
657863	2017 BT_{95}	—	November 6, 2012	Mount Lemmon	Mount Lemmon Survey	MAS	430 m	MPC · JPL
657864	2017 BJ_{96}	—	January 28, 2017	Mount Lemmon	Mount Lemmon Survey	·	630 m	MPC · JPL
657865	2017 BR_{99}	—	September 4, 2007	Mount Lemmon	Mount Lemmon Survey	·	1.1 km	MPC · JPL
657866	2017 BC_{102}	—	April 30, 2006	Kitt Peak	Spacewatch	·	1.1 km	MPC · JPL
657867	2017 BV_{110}	—	January 17, 2013	Haleakala	Pan-STARRS 1	·	890 m	MPC · JPL
657868	2017 BW_{110}	—	January 3, 2017	Haleakala	Pan-STARRS 1	·	910 m	MPC · JPL
657869	2017 BC_{118}	—	May 21, 2012	Haleakala	Pan-STARRS 1	·	3.4 km	MPC · JPL
657870	2017 BH_{121}	—	January 7, 2017	Mount Lemmon	Mount Lemmon Survey	·	660 m	MPC · JPL
657871	2017 BZ_{123}	—	October 28, 2008	Kitt Peak	Spacewatch	·	940 m	MPC · JPL
657872	2017 BW_{125}	—	January 27, 2017	Mount Lemmon	Mount Lemmon Survey	(2076)	480 m	MPC · JPL
657873	2017 BE_{126}	—	March 30, 2003	Palomar	NEAT	·	1.1 km	MPC · JPL
657874	2017 BW_{129}	—	December 25, 2005	Mount Lemmon	Mount Lemmon Survey	·	810 m	MPC · JPL
657875	2017 BQ_{133}	—	March 24, 2006	Mount Lemmon	Mount Lemmon Survey	·	820 m	MPC · JPL
657876	2017 BE_{134}	—	April 17, 2010	Mount Lemmon	Mount Lemmon Survey	NYS	900 m	MPC · JPL
657877	2017 BM_{136}	—	July 23, 2015	Haleakala	Pan-STARRS 1	H	490 m	MPC · JPL
657878	2017 BZ_{136}	—	August 28, 2014	Haleakala	Pan-STARRS 1	·	1.3 km	MPC · JPL
657879	2017 BY_{137}	—	December 8, 2010	Mount Lemmon	Mount Lemmon Survey	EOS	2.1 km	MPC · JPL
657880	2017 BQ_{147}	—	February 1, 2006	Kitt Peak	Spacewatch	·	810 m	MPC · JPL
657881	2017 BJ_{155}	—	January 29, 2017	Haleakala	Pan-STARRS 1	V	580 m	MPC · JPL
657882	2017 BM_{155}	—	January 20, 2017	Haleakala	Pan-STARRS 1	·	1.0 km	MPC · JPL
657883	2017 BU_{155}	—	January 26, 2017	Haleakala	Pan-STARRS 1	·	900 m	MPC · JPL
657884	2017 BD_{159}	—	January 31, 2017	Haleakala	Pan-STARRS 1	PHO	560 m	MPC · JPL
657885	2017 BU_{160}	—	September 9, 2015	Haleakala	Pan-STARRS 1	V	470 m	MPC · JPL
657886	2017 BB_{167}	—	January 21, 2017	Piszkés-tető	K. Sárneczky, S. Kürti	·	860 m	MPC · JPL
657887	2017 BP_{167}	—	January 29, 2017	Haleakala	Pan-STARRS 1	PHO	750 m	MPC · JPL
657888	2017 BY_{174}	—	January 27, 2017	Haleakala	Pan-STARRS 1	MAS	520 m	MPC · JPL
657889	2017 BN_{178}	—	June 27, 2011	Mount Lemmon	Mount Lemmon Survey	·	800 m	MPC · JPL
657890	2017 BL_{181}	—	January 29, 2017	Haleakala	Pan-STARRS 1	·	610 m	MPC · JPL
657891	2017 BN_{181}	—	January 26, 2017	Mount Lemmon	Mount Lemmon Survey	·	540 m	MPC · JPL
657892	2017 CR_{2}	—	February 3, 2017	Haleakala	Pan-STARRS 1	·	780 m	MPC · JPL
657893	2017 CU_{6}	—	September 21, 2012	Mount Lemmon	Mount Lemmon Survey	·	720 m	MPC · JPL
657894	2017 CD_{7}	—	January 30, 2006	Kitt Peak	Spacewatch	·	740 m	MPC · JPL
657895	2017 CH_{7}	—	January 26, 2003	Haleakala	NEAT	·	2.6 km	MPC · JPL
657896	2017 CC_{9}	—	October 30, 2008	Kitt Peak	Spacewatch	·	810 m	MPC · JPL
657897	2017 CQ_{9}	—	April 15, 2010	Mount Lemmon	Mount Lemmon Survey	·	820 m	MPC · JPL
657898	2017 CA_{11}	—	August 30, 2011	Haleakala	Pan-STARRS 1	PHO	1.0 km	MPC · JPL
657899	2017 CG_{18}	—	December 4, 2005	Kitt Peak	Spacewatch	·	640 m	MPC · JPL
657900	2017 CC_{19}	—	February 14, 2010	Mount Lemmon	Mount Lemmon Survey	·	570 m	MPC · JPL

== 657901–658000 ==
back to top

Designation			Discovery			Properties		Ref
Permanent	Provisional	Named after	Date	Site	Discoverer(s)	Category	Diam.	Ref
657901	2017 CV_{21}	—	April 10, 2010	Mount Lemmon	Mount Lemmon Survey	MAS	550 m	MPC · JPL
657902	2017 CX_{23}	—	November 24, 2011	Haleakala	Pan-STARRS 1	·	1.2 km	MPC · JPL
657903	2017 CB_{24}	—	November 8, 2008	Mount Lemmon	Mount Lemmon Survey	·	720 m	MPC · JPL
657904	2017 CY_{26}	—	October 18, 2012	Haleakala	Pan-STARRS 1	·	630 m	MPC · JPL
657905	2017 CQ_{27}	—	November 25, 2005	Kitt Peak	Spacewatch	·	700 m	MPC · JPL
657906	2017 CT_{28}	—	February 1, 2017	Mount Lemmon	Mount Lemmon Survey	NYS	680 m	MPC · JPL
657907	2017 CQ_{33}	—	July 29, 2014	Haleakala	Pan-STARRS 1	·	2.0 km	MPC · JPL
657908	2017 CM_{34}	—	December 29, 2011	Mount Lemmon	Mount Lemmon Survey	·	1.3 km	MPC · JPL
657909	2017 CQ_{34}	—	September 13, 2014	Haleakala	Pan-STARRS 1	EOS	2.0 km	MPC · JPL
657910	2017 CT_{39}	—	February 3, 2017	Haleakala	Pan-STARRS 1	·	1.1 km	MPC · JPL
657911	2017 DU	—	December 13, 2012	Mount Lemmon	Mount Lemmon Survey	·	740 m	MPC · JPL
657912	2017 DY	—	March 26, 2003	Kitt Peak	Spacewatch	·	890 m	MPC · JPL
657913	2017 DK_{4}	—	November 17, 2008	Kitt Peak	Spacewatch	NYS	940 m	MPC · JPL
657914	2017 DP_{4}	—	October 24, 2008	Las Campanas	Pozo, F., Barr, A.	·	960 m	MPC · JPL
657915	2017 DF_{6}	—	August 10, 2010	Kitt Peak	Spacewatch	·	1.8 km	MPC · JPL
657916	2017 DB_{7}	—	April 7, 2000	Kitt Peak	Spacewatch	·	1.2 km	MPC · JPL
657917	2017 DW_{9}	—	February 7, 2008	Mount Lemmon	Mount Lemmon Survey	AGN	1.4 km	MPC · JPL
657918	2017 DB_{10}	—	March 10, 2002	Cima Ekar	ADAS	·	920 m	MPC · JPL
657919	2017 DJ_{11}	—	September 18, 2003	Palomar	NEAT	·	3.7 km	MPC · JPL
657920	2017 DQ_{11}	—	May 11, 2007	Mount Lemmon	Mount Lemmon Survey	·	600 m	MPC · JPL
657921	2017 DR_{12}	—	April 11, 2003	Kitt Peak	Spacewatch	·	890 m	MPC · JPL
657922	2017 DO_{16}	—	October 22, 2003	Kitt Peak	Spacewatch	ELF	4.6 km	MPC · JPL
657923	2017 DY_{16}	—	December 1, 2008	Kitt Peak	Spacewatch	·	1.1 km	MPC · JPL
657924	2017 DR_{17}	—	February 3, 2017	Haleakala	Pan-STARRS 1	·	790 m	MPC · JPL
657925	2017 DS_{17}	—	January 18, 2013	Charleston	R. Holmes	·	1.3 km	MPC · JPL
657926	2017 DD_{18}	—	February 21, 2007	Mount Lemmon	Mount Lemmon Survey	·	640 m	MPC · JPL
657927	2017 DK_{18}	—	May 7, 2014	Haleakala	Pan-STARRS 1	·	700 m	MPC · JPL
657928	2017 DV_{19}	—	September 7, 2008	Catalina	CSS	·	740 m	MPC · JPL
657929	2017 DP_{21}	—	April 30, 2014	Haleakala	Pan-STARRS 1	·	860 m	MPC · JPL
657930	2017 DE_{26}	—	March 15, 2004	Kitt Peak	Spacewatch	·	1.4 km	MPC · JPL
657931	2017 DD_{31}	—	September 5, 2008	Kitt Peak	Spacewatch	·	820 m	MPC · JPL
657932 Cuichenzhou	2017 DW_{32}	Cuichenzhou	February 18, 2017	Xingming	Xu, Z., X. Gao	V	490 m	MPC · JPL
657933	2017 DD_{33}	—	February 17, 2010	Kitt Peak	Spacewatch	·	670 m	MPC · JPL
657934	2017 DF_{33}	—	October 30, 2008	Kitt Peak	Spacewatch	·	930 m	MPC · JPL
657935	2017 DL_{36}	—	August 5, 2005	Palomar	NEAT	H	490 m	MPC · JPL
657936	2017 DZ_{36}	—	January 7, 2017	Mount Lemmon	Mount Lemmon Survey	H	400 m	MPC · JPL
657937	2017 DP_{38}	—	April 9, 2010	Mount Lemmon	Mount Lemmon Survey	NYS	760 m	MPC · JPL
657938	2017 DH_{39}	—	September 14, 2009	La Sagra	OAM	·	2.5 km	MPC · JPL
657939	2017 DF_{44}	—	February 18, 2010	Mount Lemmon	Mount Lemmon Survey	·	650 m	MPC · JPL
657940	2017 DT_{45}	—	May 22, 2014	Haleakala	Pan-STARRS 1	·	540 m	MPC · JPL
657941	2017 DH_{52}	—	January 27, 2017	Mount Lemmon	Mount Lemmon Survey	·	580 m	MPC · JPL
657942	2017 DQ_{52}	—	January 27, 2017	Haleakala	Pan-STARRS 1	·	840 m	MPC · JPL
657943	2017 DM_{57}	—	April 9, 2003	Kitt Peak	Spacewatch	·	860 m	MPC · JPL
657944	2017 DU_{58}	—	April 12, 2005	Kitt Peak	Spacewatch	·	890 m	MPC · JPL
657945	2017 DO_{60}	—	December 1, 2008	Kitt Peak	Spacewatch	·	960 m	MPC · JPL
657946	2017 DQ_{60}	—	February 1, 2017	Haleakala	Pan-STARRS 1	PHO	1 km	MPC · JPL
657947	2017 DZ_{63}	—	January 27, 2017	Haleakala	Pan-STARRS 1	·	830 m	MPC · JPL
657948	2017 DP_{64}	—	February 27, 2012	Haleakala	Pan-STARRS 1	·	2.6 km	MPC · JPL
657949	2017 DH_{67}	—	January 20, 2013	Kitt Peak	Spacewatch	·	840 m	MPC · JPL
657950	2017 DJ_{68}	—	January 27, 2017	Haleakala	Pan-STARRS 1	·	1.0 km	MPC · JPL
657951	2017 DF_{69}	—	October 8, 2007	Mount Lemmon	Mount Lemmon Survey	·	900 m	MPC · JPL
657952	2017 DJ_{77}	—	March 14, 2007	Catalina	CSS	·	2.6 km	MPC · JPL
657953	2017 DN_{77}	—	March 27, 2012	Mount Lemmon	Mount Lemmon Survey	·	2.4 km	MPC · JPL
657954	2017 DT_{78}	—	March 13, 2007	Kitt Peak	Spacewatch	·	2.4 km	MPC · JPL
657955	2017 DV_{78}	—	December 23, 2012	Haleakala	Pan-STARRS 1	·	910 m	MPC · JPL
657956	2017 DG_{80}	—	January 30, 2003	Kitt Peak	Spacewatch	PHO	700 m	MPC · JPL
657957	2017 DK_{80}	—	March 4, 2006	Kitt Peak	Spacewatch	·	920 m	MPC · JPL
657958	2017 DT_{81}	—	April 25, 2007	Kitt Peak	Spacewatch	·	560 m	MPC · JPL
657959	2017 DU_{82}	—	October 11, 2010	Mount Lemmon	Mount Lemmon Survey	·	2.2 km	MPC · JPL
657960	2017 DR_{83}	—	May 12, 2013	Haleakala	Pan-STARRS 1	(32418)	2.1 km	MPC · JPL
657961	2017 DT_{83}	—	February 22, 2003	Palomar	NEAT	·	2.3 km	MPC · JPL
657962	2017 DX_{83}	—	February 18, 2010	Mount Lemmon	Mount Lemmon Survey	·	870 m	MPC · JPL
657963	2017 DE_{84}	—	January 30, 2017	Haleakala	Pan-STARRS 1	·	960 m	MPC · JPL
657964	2017 DA_{87}	—	November 19, 1998	Kitt Peak	Spacewatch	·	1.2 km	MPC · JPL
657965	2017 DH_{87}	—	October 15, 2015	Haleakala	Pan-STARRS 1	PHO	720 m	MPC · JPL
657966	2017 DA_{88}	—	February 1, 2012	Catalina	CSS	·	2.6 km	MPC · JPL
657967	2017 DD_{88}	—	October 11, 2004	Kitt Peak	Spacewatch	PHO	1.1 km	MPC · JPL
657968	2017 DF_{88}	—	August 26, 2009	Catalina	CSS	NAE	3.5 km	MPC · JPL
657969	2017 DX_{88}	—	October 18, 2009	Mount Lemmon	Mount Lemmon Survey	·	2.2 km	MPC · JPL
657970	2017 DP_{89}	—	August 16, 2009	Kitt Peak	Spacewatch	·	2.5 km	MPC · JPL
657971	2017 DU_{89}	—	January 28, 2006	Anderson Mesa	LONEOS	·	3.4 km	MPC · JPL
657972	2017 DY_{90}	—	May 10, 2005	Mount Lemmon	Mount Lemmon Survey	·	1.2 km	MPC · JPL
657973	2017 DQ_{91}	—	September 23, 2008	Kitt Peak	Spacewatch	·	3.3 km	MPC · JPL
657974	2017 DG_{94}	—	March 18, 2013	Mount Lemmon	Mount Lemmon Survey	·	1.1 km	MPC · JPL
657975	2017 DL_{96}	—	February 18, 2004	Kitt Peak	Spacewatch	H	500 m	MPC · JPL
657976	2017 DX_{96}	—	January 26, 2006	Mount Lemmon	Mount Lemmon Survey	·	840 m	MPC · JPL
657977	2017 DW_{98}	—	March 1, 2008	Kitt Peak	Spacewatch	·	1.5 km	MPC · JPL
657978	2017 DP_{102}	—	December 25, 2005	Kitt Peak	Spacewatch	·	720 m	MPC · JPL
657979	2017 DP_{104}	—	March 9, 2003	Kitt Peak	Spacewatch	·	790 m	MPC · JPL
657980	2017 DT_{108}	—	July 26, 2014	Haleakala	Pan-STARRS 1	·	960 m	MPC · JPL
657981	2017 DM_{110}	—	December 8, 2010	Kitt Peak	Spacewatch	·	3.1 km	MPC · JPL
657982	2017 DC_{113}	—	December 29, 2008	Mount Lemmon	Mount Lemmon Survey	PHO	890 m	MPC · JPL
657983	2017 DM_{113}	—	August 15, 2012	Siding Spring	SSS	·	3.4 km	MPC · JPL
657984	2017 DO_{114}	—	March 15, 2010	Catalina	CSS	·	940 m	MPC · JPL
657985	2017 DS_{115}	—	December 30, 2005	Kitt Peak	Spacewatch	V	670 m	MPC · JPL
657986	2017 DP_{117}	—	October 14, 2009	Bergisch Gladbach	W. Bickel	EOS	2.5 km	MPC · JPL
657987	2017 DZ_{117}	—	May 28, 2000	Socorro	LINEAR	·	880 m	MPC · JPL
657988	2017 DR_{119}	—	October 10, 2015	Haleakala	Pan-STARRS 1	·	880 m	MPC · JPL
657989	2017 DO_{130}	—	February 24, 2017	Haleakala	Pan-STARRS 1	KON	1.7 km	MPC · JPL
657990	2017 DK_{132}	—	February 23, 2017	Mount Lemmon	Mount Lemmon Survey	·	1.1 km	MPC · JPL
657991	2017 EA_{2}	—	December 5, 2008	Kitt Peak	Spacewatch	H	410 m	MPC · JPL
657992	2017 EA_{4}	—	March 20, 2012	Piszkés-tető	K. Sárneczky, K. Takáts	H	380 m	MPC · JPL
657993	2017 EZ_{5}	—	March 31, 2012	Mount Lemmon	Mount Lemmon Survey	·	2.5 km	MPC · JPL
657994	2017 EN_{6}	—	March 1, 2017	WISE	WISE	·	1.6 km	MPC · JPL
657995	2017 EC_{9}	—	December 26, 2005	Kitt Peak	Spacewatch	·	890 m	MPC · JPL
657996	2017 EB_{10}	—	January 7, 2006	Kitt Peak	Spacewatch	·	2.3 km	MPC · JPL
657997	2017 EY_{13}	—	June 5, 2003	Kitt Peak	Spacewatch	NYS	1.0 km	MPC · JPL
657998	2017 EA_{19}	—	December 3, 2004	Kitt Peak	Spacewatch	·	3.2 km	MPC · JPL
657999	2017 EG_{20}	—	June 1, 2009	Mount Lemmon	Mount Lemmon Survey	·	1.5 km	MPC · JPL
658000	2017 EB_{22}	—	February 17, 2017	Haleakala	Pan-STARRS 1	·	1.2 km	MPC · JPL

back to top

== Meaning of names ==
As minor planet discoveries are confirmed, they are given a permanent number by the IAU's Minor Planet Center (MPC), and the discoverers can then submit names for them, following the IAU's naming conventions. The list below concerns those minor planets in the specified number-range that have received names, and explains the meanings of those names.

Official naming citations of newly named small Solar System bodies are approved and published in a bulletin by IAU's Working Group for Small Bodies Nomenclature (WGSBN). Before May 2021, citations were published in MPC's Minor Planet Circulars for many decades. Recent citations can also be found on the JPL Small-Body Database (SBDB). Until his death in 2016, German astronomer Lutz D. Schmadel compiled these citations into the Dictionary of Minor Planet Names (DMP) and regularly updated the collection.

Based on Paul Herget's The Names of the Minor Planets, Schmadel also researched the unclear origin of numerous asteroids, most of which had been named prior to World War II. This article incorporates text from this source, which is in the public domain: SBDB New namings may only be added to this list below after official publication as the preannouncement of names is condemned. The WGSBN publishes a comprehensive guideline for the naming rules of non-cometary small Solar System bodies.

Named minor planet	Provisional	This minor planet was named for...	Ref · Catalog
657932 Cuichenzhou	2017 DW_{32}	Chenzhou Cui, Chinese astronomer.	IAU · 657932
