= List of minor planets: 673001–674000 =

The following is a partial list of minor planets, running from minor-planet number 673001 through 674000, inclusive. The primary data for this and other partial lists is based on JPL's "Small-Body Orbital Elements" and data available from the Minor Planet Center. Critical list information is also provided by the MPC, unless otherwise specified from Lowell Observatory. A detailed description of the table's columns and additional sources are given on the main page including a complete list of every page in this series, and a statistical break-up on the dynamical classification of minor planets.

Also see the summary list of all named bodies in numerical and alphabetical order, and the corresponding naming citations for the number range of this particular list. New namings may only be added to this list after official publication, as the preannouncement of names is condemned by the Working Group for Small Bodies Nomenclature of the International Astronomical Union.

Near-Earth obj.	MBA (inner)	MBA (outer)	Centaur
Mars-crosser	MBA (middle)	Jupiter trojan	Trans-Neptunian obj.
Unclassified

== 673001–673100 ==
Designation			Discovery			Properties		Ref
Permanent	Provisional	Named after	Date	Site	Discoverer(s)	Category	Diam.	Ref
673001	2015 AM_{36}	—	November 28, 2014	Mount Lemmon	Mount Lemmon Survey	ADE	1.5 km	MPC · JPL
673002	2015 AN_{38}	—	March 9, 2011	Mount Lemmon	Mount Lemmon Survey	·	990 m	MPC · JPL
673003	2015 AP_{38}	—	November 8, 2009	Mount Lemmon	Mount Lemmon Survey	·	1.2 km	MPC · JPL
673004	2015 AA_{39}	—	December 21, 2014	Haleakala	Pan-STARRS 1	·	1.2 km	MPC · JPL
673005	2015 AC_{39}	—	December 21, 2014	Mount Lemmon	Mount Lemmon Survey	·	1.3 km	MPC · JPL
673006	2015 AC_{42}	—	December 26, 2014	Haleakala	Pan-STARRS 1	·	1.4 km	MPC · JPL
673007	2015 AS_{42}	—	November 28, 2014	Haleakala	Pan-STARRS 1	EUN	860 m	MPC · JPL
673008	2015 AW_{42}	—	February 11, 2011	Mount Lemmon	Mount Lemmon Survey	·	2.7 km	MPC · JPL
673009	2015 AX_{42}	—	August 5, 2005	Palomar	NEAT	·	960 m	MPC · JPL
673010	2015 AZ_{42}	—	November 12, 2010	Mount Lemmon	Mount Lemmon Survey	·	1.0 km	MPC · JPL
673011	2015 AR_{45}	—	January 15, 2015	Catalina	CSS	APO · PHA	360 m	MPC · JPL
673012	2015 AY_{46}	—	September 6, 2014	Mount Lemmon	Mount Lemmon Survey	KON	1.7 km	MPC · JPL
673013	2015 AK_{47}	—	April 6, 2011	Mount Lemmon	Mount Lemmon Survey	·	3.4 km	MPC · JPL
673014 Kósakissattila	2015 AM_{49}	Kósakissattila	September 1, 2014	La Palma	EURONEAR	H	540 m	MPC · JPL
673015	2015 AS_{49}	—	July 14, 2013	Haleakala	Pan-STARRS 1	EOS	1.7 km	MPC · JPL
673016	2015 AY_{54}	—	October 26, 2009	Mount Lemmon	Mount Lemmon Survey	·	1.5 km	MPC · JPL
673017	2015 AE_{55}	—	July 13, 2013	Haleakala	Pan-STARRS 1	V	590 m	MPC · JPL
673018	2015 AH_{55}	—	November 6, 2010	Mount Lemmon	Mount Lemmon Survey	·	750 m	MPC · JPL
673019	2015 AG_{65}	—	May 14, 2012	Haleakala	Pan-STARRS 1	·	1.5 km	MPC · JPL
673020	2015 AQ_{93}	—	December 29, 2014	Mount Lemmon	Mount Lemmon Survey	·	1.4 km	MPC · JPL
673021	2015 AW_{94}	—	November 20, 2014	Haleakala	Pan-STARRS 1	·	930 m	MPC · JPL
673022	2015 AA_{97}	—	December 27, 2014	Haleakala	Pan-STARRS 1	·	1.2 km	MPC · JPL
673023	2015 AV_{98}	—	October 29, 2010	Mount Lemmon	Mount Lemmon Survey	V	480 m	MPC · JPL
673024	2015 AT_{103}	—	March 5, 2011	Catalina	CSS	EUN	1.0 km	MPC · JPL
673025	2015 AJ_{110}	—	January 14, 2015	Haleakala	Pan-STARRS 1	(194)	1.7 km	MPC · JPL
673026	2015 AV_{113}	—	February 10, 2007	Mount Lemmon	Mount Lemmon Survey	(5)	1.0 km	MPC · JPL
673027	2015 AT_{115}	—	February 12, 2011	Mount Lemmon	Mount Lemmon Survey	·	990 m	MPC · JPL
673028	2015 AE_{128}	—	October 18, 2009	Mount Lemmon	Mount Lemmon Survey	·	1.0 km	MPC · JPL
673029	2015 AA_{131}	—	December 21, 2014	Haleakala	Pan-STARRS 1	·	1.3 km	MPC · JPL
673030	2015 AT_{132}	—	January 14, 2015	Haleakala	Pan-STARRS 1	·	1.3 km	MPC · JPL
673031	2015 AY_{132}	—	November 29, 2014	Haleakala	Pan-STARRS 1	HNS	930 m	MPC · JPL
673032	2015 AX_{136}	—	December 21, 2014	Haleakala	Pan-STARRS 1	·	1.2 km	MPC · JPL
673033	2015 AD_{145}	—	February 25, 2011	Mount Lemmon	Mount Lemmon Survey	·	1.1 km	MPC · JPL
673034	2015 AK_{149}	—	January 14, 2015	Haleakala	Pan-STARRS 1	·	1.4 km	MPC · JPL
673035	2015 AV_{150}	—	May 23, 2012	Mount Lemmon	Mount Lemmon Survey	·	1.5 km	MPC · JPL
673036	2015 AQ_{154}	—	January 14, 2015	Haleakala	Pan-STARRS 1	MAR	860 m	MPC · JPL
673037	2015 AQ_{157}	—	February 14, 2005	Kitt Peak	Spacewatch	·	720 m	MPC · JPL
673038	2015 AT_{159}	—	October 5, 2013	Haleakala	Pan-STARRS 1	·	910 m	MPC · JPL
673039	2015 AB_{163}	—	January 9, 2006	Mount Lemmon	Mount Lemmon Survey	HNS	960 m	MPC · JPL
673040	2015 AW_{167}	—	September 12, 2013	Catalina	CSS	·	970 m	MPC · JPL
673041	2015 AK_{171}	—	January 14, 2015	Haleakala	Pan-STARRS 1	·	1.8 km	MPC · JPL
673042	2015 AM_{172}	—	October 5, 2013	Haleakala	Pan-STARRS 1	·	1.7 km	MPC · JPL
673043	2015 AE_{173}	—	October 13, 2013	Mount Lemmon	Mount Lemmon Survey	·	1.1 km	MPC · JPL
673044	2015 AV_{175}	—	January 14, 2015	Haleakala	Pan-STARRS 1	·	1.5 km	MPC · JPL
673045	2015 AC_{182}	—	September 10, 2010	La Sagra	OAM	·	550 m	MPC · JPL
673046	2015 AJ_{182}	—	January 14, 2015	Haleakala	Pan-STARRS 1	HOF	2.3 km	MPC · JPL
673047	2015 AG_{191}	—	November 19, 2009	Mount Lemmon	Mount Lemmon Survey	·	1.4 km	MPC · JPL
673048	2015 AB_{194}	—	January 14, 2015	Haleakala	Pan-STARRS 1	·	1.3 km	MPC · JPL
673049	2015 AG_{195}	—	May 8, 2005	Mount Lemmon	Mount Lemmon Survey	NYS	880 m	MPC · JPL
673050	2015 AQ_{195}	—	January 2, 2011	Mount Lemmon	Mount Lemmon Survey	·	1.3 km	MPC · JPL
673051	2015 AQ_{200}	—	September 16, 2009	Kitt Peak	Spacewatch	NEM	1.7 km	MPC · JPL
673052	2015 AL_{201}	—	December 26, 2014	Haleakala	Pan-STARRS 1	·	1.2 km	MPC · JPL
673053	2015 AO_{201}	—	February 3, 2011	Piszkés-tető	K. Sárneczky, Z. Kuli	·	940 m	MPC · JPL
673054	2015 AX_{202}	—	January 14, 2015	Haleakala	Pan-STARRS 1	EUN	1.0 km	MPC · JPL
673055	2015 AE_{203}	—	January 14, 2015	Haleakala	Pan-STARRS 1	·	1.2 km	MPC · JPL
673056	2015 AL_{204}	—	October 22, 2005	Kitt Peak	Spacewatch	·	1.3 km	MPC · JPL
673057	2015 AK_{208}	—	September 22, 2003	Palomar	NEAT	·	980 m	MPC · JPL
673058	2015 AT_{210}	—	August 27, 2005	Kitt Peak	Spacewatch	·	940 m	MPC · JPL
673059	2015 AQ_{215}	—	September 26, 2009	Kitt Peak	Spacewatch	·	1.2 km	MPC · JPL
673060	2015 AU_{215}	—	August 8, 2013	Haleakala	Pan-STARRS 1	·	1.2 km	MPC · JPL
673061	2015 AJ_{216}	—	May 16, 2012	Kitt Peak	Spacewatch	·	1.6 km	MPC · JPL
673062	2015 AA_{220}	—	January 15, 2015	Haleakala	Pan-STARRS 1	·	1.6 km	MPC · JPL
673063	2015 AY_{220}	—	September 26, 2006	Catalina	CSS	·	1.3 km	MPC · JPL
673064	2015 AC_{223}	—	January 15, 2015	Haleakala	Pan-STARRS 1	·	1.7 km	MPC · JPL
673065	2015 AH_{224}	—	January 15, 2015	Haleakala	Pan-STARRS 1	·	1.7 km	MPC · JPL
673066	2015 AO_{227}	—	February 11, 2011	Mount Lemmon	Mount Lemmon Survey	·	1.5 km	MPC · JPL
673067	2015 AV_{230}	—	January 15, 2015	Haleakala	Pan-STARRS 1	GEF	920 m	MPC · JPL
673068	2015 AF_{231}	—	March 29, 2012	Mount Lemmon	Mount Lemmon Survey	·	850 m	MPC · JPL
673069	2015 AS_{233}	—	June 8, 2005	Kitt Peak	Spacewatch	·	1.1 km	MPC · JPL
673070	2015 AF_{235}	—	March 11, 2011	Kitt Peak	Spacewatch	·	1.2 km	MPC · JPL
673071	2015 AN_{238}	—	March 13, 2007	Mount Lemmon	Mount Lemmon Survey	·	1.1 km	MPC · JPL
673072	2015 AJ_{240}	—	January 15, 2015	Haleakala	Pan-STARRS 1	·	1.7 km	MPC · JPL
673073	2015 AD_{245}	—	January 14, 2002	Palomar	NEAT	EUN	1.1 km	MPC · JPL
673074	2015 AH_{245}	—	November 21, 2009	Kitt Peak	Spacewatch	EUN	1.1 km	MPC · JPL
673075	2015 AK_{245}	—	April 24, 2007	Mount Lemmon	Mount Lemmon Survey	EUN	1.2 km	MPC · JPL
673076	2015 AU_{250}	—	October 27, 2005	Kitt Peak	Spacewatch	·	1.2 km	MPC · JPL
673077	2015 AT_{256}	—	September 1, 2013	Haleakala	Pan-STARRS 1	·	1.3 km	MPC · JPL
673078	2015 AR_{257}	—	March 12, 2011	Mount Lemmon	Mount Lemmon Survey	·	1.3 km	MPC · JPL
673079	2015 AS_{260}	—	November 27, 2006	Kitt Peak	Spacewatch	·	980 m	MPC · JPL
673080	2015 AD_{262}	—	November 8, 2009	Mount Lemmon	Mount Lemmon Survey	·	1.4 km	MPC · JPL
673081	2015 AB_{265}	—	January 15, 2015	Haleakala	Pan-STARRS 1	JUN	740 m	MPC · JPL
673082	2015 AC_{276}	—	March 20, 2007	Kitt Peak	Spacewatch	·	1.4 km	MPC · JPL
673083	2015 AK_{276}	—	March 1, 2011	Catalina	CSS	·	1.4 km	MPC · JPL
673084	2015 AA_{280}	—	November 4, 2014	Haleakala	Pan-STARRS 1	·	2.0 km	MPC · JPL
673085	2015 AO_{280}	—	January 31, 2006	Kitt Peak	Spacewatch	·	1.3 km	MPC · JPL
673086	2015 AF_{281}	—	August 12, 2013	Haleakala	Pan-STARRS 1	·	540 m	MPC · JPL
673087	2015 AJ_{281}	—	March 25, 2011	La Silla	La Silla	cubewano (hot)	511 km	MPC · JPL
673088	2015 AL_{281}	—	January 14, 2015	Haleakala	Pan-STARRS 1	cubewano (cold)	192 km	MPC · JPL
673089	2015 AY_{281}	—	November 18, 2014	Mount Lemmon	Mount Lemmon Survey	H	660 m	MPC · JPL
673090	2015 AB_{284}	—	January 8, 2015	Haleakala	Pan-STARRS 1	HNS	860 m	MPC · JPL
673091	2015 AG_{284}	—	September 16, 2009	Catalina	CSS	·	1.6 km	MPC · JPL
673092	2015 AD_{285}	—	January 11, 2015	Haleakala	Pan-STARRS 1	·	1.0 km	MPC · JPL
673093	2015 AL_{285}	—	March 11, 2007	Kitt Peak	Spacewatch	·	1.2 km	MPC · JPL
673094	2015 AU_{286}	—	March 28, 2011	Mount Lemmon	Mount Lemmon Survey	ADE	1.4 km	MPC · JPL
673095	2015 AX_{286}	—	January 15, 2015	Haleakala	Pan-STARRS 1	·	1.7 km	MPC · JPL
673096	2015 AR_{287}	—	September 19, 2003	Anderson Mesa	LONEOS	MAS	640 m	MPC · JPL
673097	2015 AY_{287}	—	October 1, 2009	Mount Lemmon	Mount Lemmon Survey	·	1.3 km	MPC · JPL
673098	2015 AL_{288}	—	October 22, 2009	Mount Lemmon	Mount Lemmon Survey	·	1.5 km	MPC · JPL
673099	2015 AZ_{290}	—	November 26, 2014	Mount Lemmon	Mount Lemmon Survey	JUN	760 m	MPC · JPL
673100	2015 AW_{291}	—	October 16, 2001	Palomar	NEAT	·	850 m	MPC · JPL

== 673101–673200 ==
back to top

Designation			Discovery			Properties		Ref
Permanent	Provisional	Named after	Date	Site	Discoverer(s)	Category	Diam.	Ref
673101	2015 AV_{293}	—	January 12, 2015	Haleakala	Pan-STARRS 1	·	990 m	MPC · JPL
673102	2015 AX_{293}	—	January 9, 2015	Haleakala	Pan-STARRS 1	H	480 m	MPC · JPL
673103	2015 AE_{294}	—	January 15, 2015	Haleakala	Pan-STARRS 1	·	1.8 km	MPC · JPL
673104	2015 AC_{298}	—	July 3, 2016	Mount Lemmon	Mount Lemmon Survey	(1547)	1.2 km	MPC · JPL
673105	2015 AJ_{299}	—	January 15, 2015	Haleakala	Pan-STARRS 1	·	1.9 km	MPC · JPL
673106	2015 AL_{307}	—	November 29, 2018	Mount Lemmon	Mount Lemmon Survey	·	1.2 km	MPC · JPL
673107	2015 BP_{1}	—	December 27, 2014	Haleakala	Pan-STARRS 1	·	910 m	MPC · JPL
673108	2015 BJ_{4}	—	March 13, 2008	Mount Lemmon	Mount Lemmon Survey	H	470 m	MPC · JPL
673109	2015 BC_{5}	—	October 28, 2014	Haleakala	Pan-STARRS 1	·	1.8 km	MPC · JPL
673110	2015 BP_{5}	—	September 10, 2007	Mount Lemmon	Mount Lemmon Survey	·	750 m	MPC · JPL
673111	2015 BV_{6}	—	January 30, 2011	Mount Lemmon	Mount Lemmon Survey	·	1.4 km	MPC · JPL
673112	2015 BF_{7}	—	October 11, 2007	Kitt Peak	Spacewatch	·	600 m	MPC · JPL
673113	2015 BP_{7}	—	October 24, 2014	Mount Lemmon	Mount Lemmon Survey	ADE	1.5 km	MPC · JPL
673114	2015 BP_{10}	—	November 20, 2001	Kitt Peak	Spacewatch	(5)	1.0 km	MPC · JPL
673115	2015 BY_{10}	—	December 26, 2014	Haleakala	Pan-STARRS 1	·	1.1 km	MPC · JPL
673116	2015 BX_{11}	—	December 16, 2014	Haleakala	Pan-STARRS 1	·	1.2 km	MPC · JPL
673117	2015 BG_{14}	—	February 8, 2011	Mount Lemmon	Mount Lemmon Survey	JUN	880 m	MPC · JPL
673118	2015 BE_{16}	—	November 25, 2005	Kitt Peak	Spacewatch	·	1.1 km	MPC · JPL
673119	2015 BM_{17}	—	August 12, 2013	Haleakala	Pan-STARRS 1	JUN	780 m	MPC · JPL
673120	2015 BX_{17}	—	February 7, 2002	Kitt Peak	Spacewatch	·	1.4 km	MPC · JPL
673121	2015 BY_{17}	—	January 30, 2006	Kitt Peak	Spacewatch	·	1.4 km	MPC · JPL
673122	2015 BR_{18}	—	June 14, 2012	Haleakala	Pan-STARRS 1	·	3.1 km	MPC · JPL
673123	2015 BU_{21}	—	November 29, 2014	Haleakala	Pan-STARRS 1	·	2.2 km	MPC · JPL
673124	2015 BP_{24}	—	December 18, 2009	Kitt Peak	Spacewatch	·	1.6 km	MPC · JPL
673125	2015 BY_{24}	—	December 24, 2005	Kitt Peak	Spacewatch	·	1.4 km	MPC · JPL
673126	2015 BO_{28}	—	December 9, 2010	Kitt Peak	Spacewatch	·	1.0 km	MPC · JPL
673127	2015 BS_{30}	—	September 21, 2009	Mount Lemmon	Mount Lemmon Survey	·	1.2 km	MPC · JPL
673128	2015 BA_{35}	—	May 12, 2011	Mount Lemmon	Mount Lemmon Survey	·	1.5 km	MPC · JPL
673129	2015 BJ_{35}	—	January 16, 2015	Haleakala	Pan-STARRS 1	·	1.5 km	MPC · JPL
673130	2015 BO_{35}	—	December 11, 2009	Pla D'Arguines	R. Ferrando, Ferrando, M.	·	1.6 km	MPC · JPL
673131	2015 BK_{42}	—	December 15, 2001	Apache Point	SDSS Collaboration	·	1.3 km	MPC · JPL
673132	2015 BP_{44}	—	June 4, 2013	Kitt Peak	Spacewatch	·	1.4 km	MPC · JPL
673133	2015 BG_{45}	—	December 12, 2014	Haleakala	Pan-STARRS 1	·	1.4 km	MPC · JPL
673134	2015 BU_{45}	—	November 17, 2014	Mount Lemmon	Mount Lemmon Survey	·	1.1 km	MPC · JPL
673135	2015 BW_{47}	—	October 2, 2013	Haleakala	Pan-STARRS 1	VER	2.4 km	MPC · JPL
673136	2015 BA_{48}	—	December 12, 2014	Haleakala	Pan-STARRS 1	·	1.3 km	MPC · JPL
673137	2015 BP_{48}	—	December 16, 2014	Haleakala	Pan-STARRS 1	·	1.1 km	MPC · JPL
673138	2015 BE_{50}	—	January 19, 2012	Haleakala	Pan-STARRS 1	·	990 m	MPC · JPL
673139	2015 BN_{53}	—	January 17, 2015	Mount Lemmon	Mount Lemmon Survey	·	1.6 km	MPC · JPL
673140	2015 BF_{54}	—	January 17, 2015	Mount Lemmon	Mount Lemmon Survey	·	1.1 km	MPC · JPL
673141	2015 BY_{55}	—	December 29, 2014	Haleakala	Pan-STARRS 1	·	1.4 km	MPC · JPL
673142	2015 BC_{57}	—	January 17, 2015	Haleakala	Pan-STARRS 1	·	940 m	MPC · JPL
673143	2015 BW_{60}	—	January 11, 2002	Kitt Peak	Spacewatch	·	1.1 km	MPC · JPL
673144	2015 BW_{61}	—	December 22, 2005	Kitt Peak	Spacewatch	·	1.4 km	MPC · JPL
673145	2015 BP_{63}	—	January 17, 2015	Haleakala	Pan-STARRS 1	·	1.5 km	MPC · JPL
673146	2015 BH_{64}	—	August 27, 2000	Cerro Tololo	Deep Ecliptic Survey	·	1.6 km	MPC · JPL
673147	2015 BF_{65}	—	November 24, 2005	Palomar	NEAT	·	1.6 km	MPC · JPL
673148	2015 BV_{66}	—	April 13, 2011	Haleakala	Pan-STARRS 1	BRA	1.5 km	MPC · JPL
673149	2015 BC_{70}	—	November 26, 2014	Haleakala	Pan-STARRS 1	·	1.4 km	MPC · JPL
673150	2015 BC_{73}	—	April 18, 2007	Mount Lemmon	Mount Lemmon Survey	·	1.3 km	MPC · JPL
673151	2015 BA_{74}	—	April 27, 2012	Haleakala	Pan-STARRS 1	·	730 m	MPC · JPL
673152	2015 BG_{74}	—	February 8, 2008	Kitt Peak	Spacewatch	V	680 m	MPC · JPL
673153	2015 BT_{74}	—	January 17, 2015	Haleakala	Pan-STARRS 1	·	1.3 km	MPC · JPL
673154	2015 BK_{75}	—	September 29, 2009	Mount Lemmon	Mount Lemmon Survey	·	1.1 km	MPC · JPL
673155	2015 BC_{76}	—	January 17, 2015	Haleakala	Pan-STARRS 1	·	1.4 km	MPC · JPL
673156	2015 BJ_{76}	—	October 24, 2013	Mount Lemmon	Mount Lemmon Survey	·	1.6 km	MPC · JPL
673157	2015 BX_{78}	—	March 2, 2011	Kitt Peak	Spacewatch	·	1.3 km	MPC · JPL
673158	2015 BV_{81}	—	February 25, 2011	Mount Lemmon	Mount Lemmon Survey	·	1.3 km	MPC · JPL
673159	2015 BY_{85}	—	May 12, 2012	Mount Lemmon	Mount Lemmon Survey	·	1.4 km	MPC · JPL
673160	2015 BJ_{89}	—	August 9, 2013	Kitt Peak	Spacewatch	V	760 m	MPC · JPL
673161	2015 BT_{91}	—	January 2, 2011	Catalina	CSS	·	2.7 km	MPC · JPL
673162	2015 BR_{93}	—	February 6, 2006	Kitt Peak	Spacewatch	·	1.4 km	MPC · JPL
673163	2015 BL_{94}	—	December 24, 2014	Kitt Peak	Spacewatch	·	1.6 km	MPC · JPL
673164	2015 BU_{98}	—	November 26, 2014	Haleakala	Pan-STARRS 1	·	1.4 km	MPC · JPL
673165	2015 BY_{99}	—	January 27, 2011	Mount Lemmon	Mount Lemmon Survey	·	920 m	MPC · JPL
673166	2015 BN_{104}	—	December 21, 2014	Haleakala	Pan-STARRS 1	·	1.2 km	MPC · JPL
673167	2015 BN_{109}	—	February 23, 2003	Kitt Peak	Spacewatch	·	1.4 km	MPC · JPL
673168	2015 BD_{111}	—	September 9, 2013	Haleakala	Pan-STARRS 1	·	1.5 km	MPC · JPL
673169	2015 BA_{112}	—	October 22, 2009	Mount Lemmon	Mount Lemmon Survey	·	1.3 km	MPC · JPL
673170	2015 BZ_{112}	—	October 27, 2009	Kitt Peak	Spacewatch	·	1.4 km	MPC · JPL
673171	2015 BD_{116}	—	October 11, 2010	Mount Lemmon	Mount Lemmon Survey	·	820 m	MPC · JPL
673172	2015 BQ_{117}	—	July 12, 2013	Haleakala	Pan-STARRS 1	JUN	780 m	MPC · JPL
673173	2015 BV_{120}	—	November 20, 2009	Mount Lemmon	Mount Lemmon Survey	·	1.4 km	MPC · JPL
673174	2015 BZ_{120}	—	August 9, 2013	Haleakala	Pan-STARRS 1	EUN	990 m	MPC · JPL
673175	2015 BS_{121}	—	October 1, 2013	Kitt Peak	Spacewatch	HOF	2.2 km	MPC · JPL
673176	2015 BT_{126}	—	July 19, 2006	Mauna Kea	P. A. Wiegert, D. Subasinghe	·	2.8 km	MPC · JPL
673177	2015 BV_{126}	—	February 7, 2006	Kitt Peak	Spacewatch	·	1.7 km	MPC · JPL
673178	2015 BF_{127}	—	September 15, 2013	Mount Lemmon	Mount Lemmon Survey	·	900 m	MPC · JPL
673179	2015 BG_{127}	—	February 10, 2008	Mount Lemmon	Mount Lemmon Survey	·	720 m	MPC · JPL
673180	2015 BK_{127}	—	January 17, 2015	Haleakala	Pan-STARRS 1	·	1.5 km	MPC · JPL
673181	2015 BB_{129}	—	September 18, 2009	Catalina	CSS	EUN	980 m	MPC · JPL
673182	2015 BT_{134}	—	October 3, 2013	Haleakala	Pan-STARRS 1	·	1.3 km	MPC · JPL
673183	2015 BZ_{136}	—	September 12, 2013	Catalina	CSS	·	1.8 km	MPC · JPL
673184	2015 BE_{138}	—	October 3, 2013	Haleakala	Pan-STARRS 1	HOF	2.1 km	MPC · JPL
673185	2015 BG_{138}	—	September 15, 2013	Mount Lemmon	Mount Lemmon Survey	·	1.4 km	MPC · JPL
673186	2015 BP_{138}	—	January 17, 2015	Haleakala	Pan-STARRS 1	·	1.3 km	MPC · JPL
673187	2015 BA_{139}	—	October 3, 2013	Haleakala	Pan-STARRS 1	NEM	1.7 km	MPC · JPL
673188	2015 BW_{139}	—	January 17, 2015	Haleakala	Pan-STARRS 1	·	1.5 km	MPC · JPL
673189	2015 BX_{139}	—	August 20, 2006	Palomar	NEAT	·	950 m	MPC · JPL
673190	2015 BB_{140}	—	December 30, 2005	Kitt Peak	Spacewatch	·	1.1 km	MPC · JPL
673191	2015 BW_{140}	—	September 19, 2009	Mount Lemmon	Mount Lemmon Survey	·	1.2 km	MPC · JPL
673192	2015 BU_{142}	—	December 17, 2009	Mount Lemmon	Mount Lemmon Survey	·	1.9 km	MPC · JPL
673193	2015 BB_{143}	—	January 17, 2015	Haleakala	Pan-STARRS 1	·	1.4 km	MPC · JPL
673194	2015 BV_{145}	—	January 17, 2015	Haleakala	Pan-STARRS 1	·	1.0 km	MPC · JPL
673195	2015 BE_{146}	—	January 17, 2015	Haleakala	Pan-STARRS 1	·	1.7 km	MPC · JPL
673196	2015 BB_{149}	—	January 17, 2015	Haleakala	Pan-STARRS 1	·	1.1 km	MPC · JPL
673197	2015 BM_{150}	—	July 14, 2013	Haleakala	Pan-STARRS 1	·	1.3 km	MPC · JPL
673198	2015 BH_{154}	—	October 26, 2013	Mount Lemmon	Mount Lemmon Survey	AGN	990 m	MPC · JPL
673199	2015 BO_{159}	—	October 25, 2009	Kitt Peak	Spacewatch	·	1.1 km	MPC · JPL
673200	2015 BE_{162}	—	December 11, 2009	Catalina	CSS	·	1.2 km	MPC · JPL

== 673201–673300 ==
back to top

Designation			Discovery			Properties		Ref
Permanent	Provisional	Named after	Date	Site	Discoverer(s)	Category	Diam.	Ref
673201	2015 BO_{166}	—	October 16, 2009	Mount Lemmon	Mount Lemmon Survey	·	930 m	MPC · JPL
673202	2015 BP_{171}	—	August 5, 2013	Piszkéstető	K. Sárneczky	·	1.0 km	MPC · JPL
673203	2015 BY_{180}	—	January 17, 2015	Haleakala	Pan-STARRS 1	·	1.1 km	MPC · JPL
673204	2015 BN_{182}	—	May 10, 2011	Mount Lemmon	Mount Lemmon Survey	·	1.5 km	MPC · JPL
673205	2015 BX_{184}	—	October 27, 2009	Kitt Peak	Spacewatch	·	1.3 km	MPC · JPL
673206	2015 BU_{185}	—	November 26, 2013	Mount Lemmon	Mount Lemmon Survey	·	1.2 km	MPC · JPL
673207	2015 BL_{187}	—	November 8, 2009	Kitt Peak	Spacewatch	·	1.4 km	MPC · JPL
673208	2015 BH_{191}	—	January 17, 2015	Haleakala	Pan-STARRS 1	·	1.0 km	MPC · JPL
673209	2015 BP_{192}	—	March 11, 2011	Kitt Peak	Spacewatch	·	1.2 km	MPC · JPL
673210	2015 BT_{193}	—	January 17, 2015	Haleakala	Pan-STARRS 1	·	1.2 km	MPC · JPL
673211	2015 BK_{196}	—	July 14, 2013	Haleakala	Pan-STARRS 1	·	1.8 km	MPC · JPL
673212	2015 BB_{199}	—	November 4, 2013	Mount Lemmon	Mount Lemmon Survey	AGN	830 m	MPC · JPL
673213	2015 BD_{202}	—	March 27, 2011	Mount Lemmon	Mount Lemmon Survey	·	1.4 km	MPC · JPL
673214	2015 BK_{202}	—	June 11, 2011	Mount Lemmon	Mount Lemmon Survey	·	1.7 km	MPC · JPL
673215	2015 BE_{203}	—	January 17, 2015	Haleakala	Pan-STARRS 1	·	1.1 km	MPC · JPL
673216	2015 BW_{203}	—	January 18, 2015	Kitt Peak	Spacewatch	EUN	990 m	MPC · JPL
673217	2015 BQ_{205}	—	January 18, 2015	Kitt Peak	Spacewatch	·	2.1 km	MPC · JPL
673218	2015 BL_{207}	—	November 18, 2014	Haleakala	Pan-STARRS 1	·	800 m	MPC · JPL
673219	2015 BC_{208}	—	November 26, 2011	Mount Lemmon	Mount Lemmon Survey	·	780 m	MPC · JPL
673220	2015 BN_{209}	—	May 16, 2012	Haleakala	Pan-STARRS 1	·	1.7 km	MPC · JPL
673221	2015 BN_{210}	—	March 12, 2004	Palomar	NEAT	·	1.1 km	MPC · JPL
673222	2015 BR_{211}	—	December 24, 2014	Mount Lemmon	Mount Lemmon Survey	·	1.6 km	MPC · JPL
673223	2015 BZ_{211}	—	March 15, 2007	Mount Lemmon	Mount Lemmon Survey	·	1.2 km	MPC · JPL
673224	2015 BC_{214}	—	September 1, 2005	Kitt Peak	Spacewatch	·	910 m	MPC · JPL
673225	2015 BF_{214}	—	February 10, 2011	Mount Lemmon	Mount Lemmon Survey	·	960 m	MPC · JPL
673226	2015 BY_{214}	—	January 18, 2015	Mount Lemmon	Mount Lemmon Survey	·	1.5 km	MPC · JPL
673227	2015 BW_{215}	—	September 17, 2010	Mount Lemmon	Mount Lemmon Survey	NYS	770 m	MPC · JPL
673228	2015 BC_{216}	—	February 23, 2007	Kitt Peak	Spacewatch	·	1.1 km	MPC · JPL
673229	2015 BC_{217}	—	January 18, 2015	Haleakala	Pan-STARRS 1	JUN	630 m	MPC · JPL
673230	2015 BZ_{220}	—	January 24, 2011	Mount Lemmon	Mount Lemmon Survey	·	790 m	MPC · JPL
673231	2015 BJ_{221}	—	February 28, 2008	Mount Lemmon	Mount Lemmon Survey	NYS	1.1 km	MPC · JPL
673232	2015 BO_{222}	—	November 23, 2014	Haleakala	Pan-STARRS 1	·	1.5 km	MPC · JPL
673233	2015 BQ_{222}	—	January 18, 2015	Mount Lemmon	Mount Lemmon Survey	·	1.7 km	MPC · JPL
673234	2015 BB_{223}	—	November 21, 2007	Mount Lemmon	Mount Lemmon Survey	·	760 m	MPC · JPL
673235	2015 BF_{223}	—	October 22, 2009	Mount Lemmon	Mount Lemmon Survey	·	1.2 km	MPC · JPL
673236	2015 BT_{223}	—	January 18, 2015	Mount Lemmon	Mount Lemmon Survey	·	1.1 km	MPC · JPL
673237	2015 BX_{223}	—	June 20, 2013	Haleakala	Pan-STARRS 1	·	1.3 km	MPC · JPL
673238	2015 BQ_{228}	—	December 29, 2014	Haleakala	Pan-STARRS 1	·	910 m	MPC · JPL
673239	2015 BD_{232}	—	March 1, 2011	Mount Lemmon	Mount Lemmon Survey	·	1.5 km	MPC · JPL
673240	2015 BA_{235}	—	March 5, 2011	Catalina	CSS	·	1.3 km	MPC · JPL
673241	2015 BK_{238}	—	May 20, 2012	Mount Lemmon	Mount Lemmon Survey	·	4.4 km	MPC · JPL
673242	2015 BE_{241}	—	December 25, 2005	Mount Lemmon	Mount Lemmon Survey	·	1.1 km	MPC · JPL
673243	2015 BQ_{243}	—	March 31, 2003	Anderson Mesa	LONEOS	·	1.5 km	MPC · JPL
673244	2015 BG_{244}	—	December 25, 2003	Apache Point	SDSS Collaboration	·	1.3 km	MPC · JPL
673245	2015 BF_{247}	—	September 9, 2008	Mount Lemmon	Mount Lemmon Survey	·	1.5 km	MPC · JPL
673246	2015 BJ_{247}	—	August 20, 2003	Palomar	NEAT	·	720 m	MPC · JPL
673247	2015 BB_{249}	—	January 18, 2015	Haleakala	Pan-STARRS 1	NYS	750 m	MPC · JPL
673248	2015 BQ_{249}	—	December 27, 2014	Mount Lemmon	Mount Lemmon Survey	JUN	820 m	MPC · JPL
673249	2015 BT_{250}	—	January 18, 2015	Haleakala	Pan-STARRS 1	·	1.5 km	MPC · JPL
673250	2015 BT_{253}	—	September 1, 2013	Haleakala	Pan-STARRS 1	EUN	1.0 km	MPC · JPL
673251	2015 BX_{256}	—	January 18, 2015	Haleakala	Pan-STARRS 1	·	1.4 km	MPC · JPL
673252	2015 BD_{257}	—	January 7, 2006	Mount Lemmon	Mount Lemmon Survey	·	1.9 km	MPC · JPL
673253	2015 BG_{257}	—	March 15, 2007	Mount Lemmon	Mount Lemmon Survey	·	1.2 km	MPC · JPL
673254	2015 BO_{257}	—	January 18, 2015	Haleakala	Pan-STARRS 1	·	1.5 km	MPC · JPL
673255	2015 BX_{258}	—	December 18, 2001	Socorro	LINEAR	·	970 m	MPC · JPL
673256	2015 BL_{263}	—	November 20, 2009	Mount Lemmon	Mount Lemmon Survey	·	1.4 km	MPC · JPL
673257	2015 BZ_{263}	—	September 30, 2013	Mount Lemmon	Mount Lemmon Survey	·	1.7 km	MPC · JPL
673258	2015 BA_{266}	—	December 29, 2014	Haleakala	Pan-STARRS 1	·	1.2 km	MPC · JPL
673259	2015 BB_{266}	—	March 10, 2011	Mount Lemmon	Mount Lemmon Survey	·	1.8 km	MPC · JPL
673260	2015 BG_{266}	—	July 8, 2013	Haleakala	Pan-STARRS 1	·	1.6 km	MPC · JPL
673261	2015 BU_{266}	—	January 19, 2015	Haleakala	Pan-STARRS 1	·	1.0 km	MPC · JPL
673262	2015 BD_{267}	—	September 18, 2014	Haleakala	Pan-STARRS 1	·	2.5 km	MPC · JPL
673263	2015 BW_{267}	—	May 16, 2012	Haleakala	Pan-STARRS 1	·	4.1 km	MPC · JPL
673264	2015 BQ_{268}	—	August 29, 2014	Haleakala	Pan-STARRS 1	·	1.1 km	MPC · JPL
673265	2015 BJ_{270}	—	October 30, 2014	Mount Lemmon	Mount Lemmon Survey	·	720 m	MPC · JPL
673266	2015 BL_{270}	—	January 19, 2015	Kitt Peak	Spacewatch	·	1.3 km	MPC · JPL
673267	2015 BC_{271}	—	November 11, 2014	Haleakala	Pan-STARRS 1	BRG	1.4 km	MPC · JPL
673268	2015 BO_{275}	—	January 19, 2015	Mount Lemmon	Mount Lemmon Survey	·	1.1 km	MPC · JPL
673269	2015 BY_{276}	—	October 20, 2003	Kitt Peak	Spacewatch	V	630 m	MPC · JPL
673270	2015 BJ_{277}	—	January 19, 2015	Mount Lemmon	Mount Lemmon Survey	·	1.3 km	MPC · JPL
673271	2015 BP_{278}	—	January 19, 2005	Kitt Peak	Spacewatch	·	670 m	MPC · JPL
673272	2015 BA_{279}	—	January 19, 2015	Kitt Peak	Spacewatch	HNS	880 m	MPC · JPL
673273	2015 BB_{291}	—	January 19, 2015	Haleakala	Pan-STARRS 1	ADE	1.6 km	MPC · JPL
673274	2015 BH_{291}	—	January 14, 2011	Mount Lemmon	Mount Lemmon Survey	(1547)	1.4 km	MPC · JPL
673275	2015 BC_{297}	—	May 18, 2012	Mount Lemmon	Mount Lemmon Survey	·	1.3 km	MPC · JPL
673276	2015 BC_{298}	—	January 19, 2015	Haleakala	Pan-STARRS 1	·	1.4 km	MPC · JPL
673277	2015 BO_{302}	—	October 7, 2005	Mauna Kea	A. Boattini	·	1.6 km	MPC · JPL
673278	2015 BG_{303}	—	January 19, 2015	Haleakala	Pan-STARRS 1	HNS	1.0 km	MPC · JPL
673279	2015 BR_{305}	—	December 26, 2014	Haleakala	Pan-STARRS 1	ADE	1.5 km	MPC · JPL
673280	2015 BP_{307}	—	November 20, 2006	Mount Lemmon	Mount Lemmon Survey	RAF	900 m	MPC · JPL
673281	2015 BF_{308}	—	March 1, 2011	Mount Lemmon	Mount Lemmon Survey	JUN	800 m	MPC · JPL
673282	2015 BQ_{309}	—	January 20, 2015	Mount Lemmon	Mount Lemmon Survey	·	1.7 km	MPC · JPL
673283	2015 BC_{310}	—	January 20, 2015	Mount Lemmon	Mount Lemmon Survey	DOR	1.8 km	MPC · JPL
673284	2015 BT_{310}	—	January 21, 2015	Haleakala	Pan-STARRS 1	H	480 m	MPC · JPL
673285	2015 BW_{312}	—	December 26, 2014	Haleakala	Pan-STARRS 1	·	1.0 km	MPC · JPL
673286	2015 BY_{315}	—	November 24, 2014	Haleakala	Pan-STARRS 1	·	1.2 km	MPC · JPL
673287	2015 BZ_{315}	—	January 26, 2011	Mount Lemmon	Mount Lemmon Survey	·	1.9 km	MPC · JPL
673288	2015 BF_{316}	—	January 17, 2015	Haleakala	Pan-STARRS 1	·	1.5 km	MPC · JPL
673289	2015 BH_{316}	—	August 26, 2009	Catalina	CSS	·	1.3 km	MPC · JPL
673290	2015 BR_{320}	—	October 23, 2009	Mount Lemmon	Mount Lemmon Survey	·	1.3 km	MPC · JPL
673291	2015 BX_{321}	—	January 17, 2015	Haleakala	Pan-STARRS 1	AGN	930 m	MPC · JPL
673292	2015 BZ_{322}	—	May 23, 2002	Palomar	NEAT	·	940 m	MPC · JPL
673293	2015 BB_{324}	—	October 14, 2009	Mount Lemmon	Mount Lemmon Survey	·	1.1 km	MPC · JPL
673294	2015 BA_{327}	—	January 17, 2007	Kitt Peak	Spacewatch	3:2	4.5 km	MPC · JPL
673295	2015 BP_{327}	—	January 22, 2006	Mount Lemmon	Mount Lemmon Survey	·	1.3 km	MPC · JPL
673296	2015 BZ_{327}	—	January 17, 2015	Haleakala	Pan-STARRS 1	·	970 m	MPC · JPL
673297	2015 BA_{334}	—	December 7, 2005	Kitt Peak	Spacewatch	·	1.1 km	MPC · JPL
673298	2015 BY_{334}	—	January 17, 2015	Haleakala	Pan-STARRS 1	·	1.3 km	MPC · JPL
673299	2015 BJ_{335}	—	October 28, 2013	Mount Lemmon	Mount Lemmon Survey	·	1.5 km	MPC · JPL
673300	2015 BD_{338}	—	January 17, 2015	Haleakala	Pan-STARRS 1	·	1.3 km	MPC · JPL

== 673301–673400 ==
back to top

Designation			Discovery			Properties		Ref
Permanent	Provisional	Named after	Date	Site	Discoverer(s)	Category	Diam.	Ref
673301	2015 BP_{342}	—	November 27, 2013	Haleakala	Pan-STARRS 1	·	3.8 km	MPC · JPL
673302	2015 BV_{343}	—	August 15, 2013	Haleakala	Pan-STARRS 1	EUN	880 m	MPC · JPL
673303	2015 BM_{347}	—	August 14, 2001	Haleakala	NEAT	VER	2.9 km	MPC · JPL
673304	2015 BB_{351}	—	January 18, 2015	Haleakala	Pan-STARRS 1	·	1.0 km	MPC · JPL
673305	2015 BJ_{359}	—	March 30, 2011	Haleakala	Pan-STARRS 1	·	1.5 km	MPC · JPL
673306	2015 BC_{378}	—	January 20, 2015	Haleakala	Pan-STARRS 1	·	790 m	MPC · JPL
673307	2015 BH_{378}	—	October 3, 2013	Haleakala	Pan-STARRS 1	·	1.5 km	MPC · JPL
673308	2015 BQ_{381}	—	January 20, 2015	Haleakala	Pan-STARRS 1	·	520 m	MPC · JPL
673309	2015 BV_{383}	—	January 20, 2015	Haleakala	Pan-STARRS 1	·	1.1 km	MPC · JPL
673310	2015 BL_{384}	—	August 8, 2004	Bergisch Gladbach	W. Bickel	·	1.1 km	MPC · JPL
673311	2015 BA_{385}	—	January 20, 2015	Haleakala	Pan-STARRS 1	·	1.2 km	MPC · JPL
673312	2015 BV_{385}	—	September 6, 2013	Kitt Peak	Spacewatch	·	1.4 km	MPC · JPL
673313	2015 BA_{389}	—	January 20, 2015	Haleakala	Pan-STARRS 1	·	1.1 km	MPC · JPL
673314	2015 BK_{389}	—	December 2, 2005	Mount Lemmon	Mount Lemmon Survey	·	1.1 km	MPC · JPL
673315	2015 BV_{394}	—	January 20, 2015	Haleakala	Pan-STARRS 1	JUN	860 m	MPC · JPL
673316	2015 BN_{397}	—	May 4, 2005	Mount Lemmon	Mount Lemmon Survey	MAS	700 m	MPC · JPL
673317	2015 BA_{401}	—	September 3, 2005	Palomar	NEAT	(5)	1.3 km	MPC · JPL
673318	2015 BO_{401}	—	September 13, 2013	Catalina	CSS	·	1.4 km	MPC · JPL
673319	2015 BP_{404}	—	August 7, 2008	Kitt Peak	Spacewatch	·	1.3 km	MPC · JPL
673320	2015 BG_{408}	—	January 20, 2015	Haleakala	Pan-STARRS 1	WIT	870 m	MPC · JPL
673321	2015 BW_{410}	—	January 20, 2015	Haleakala	Pan-STARRS 1	·	1.6 km	MPC · JPL
673322	2015 BT_{414}	—	August 31, 2005	Palomar	NEAT	·	960 m	MPC · JPL
673323	2015 BB_{420}	—	October 11, 2004	Kitt Peak	Deep Ecliptic Survey	·	1.1 km	MPC · JPL
673324	2015 BS_{422}	—	September 3, 2008	Kitt Peak	Spacewatch	·	1.5 km	MPC · JPL
673325	2015 BA_{425}	—	August 24, 2012	Catalina	CSS	·	1.6 km	MPC · JPL
673326	2015 BB_{425}	—	January 23, 2011	Mount Lemmon	Mount Lemmon Survey	·	890 m	MPC · JPL
673327	2015 BC_{427}	—	January 20, 2015	Haleakala	Pan-STARRS 1	MRX	800 m	MPC · JPL
673328	2015 BM_{429}	—	January 20, 2015	Haleakala	Pan-STARRS 1	·	1.2 km	MPC · JPL
673329	2015 BH_{430}	—	January 20, 2015	Haleakala	Pan-STARRS 1	·	1.5 km	MPC · JPL
673330	2015 BO_{431}	—	October 3, 2013	Haleakala	Pan-STARRS 1	AGN	860 m	MPC · JPL
673331	2015 BF_{435}	—	November 23, 2006	Mount Lemmon	Mount Lemmon Survey	V	670 m	MPC · JPL
673332	2015 BT_{435}	—	January 20, 2015	Haleakala	Pan-STARRS 1	·	1.3 km	MPC · JPL
673333	2015 BM_{436}	—	January 20, 2015	Haleakala	Pan-STARRS 1	·	2.2 km	MPC · JPL
673334	2015 BN_{437}	—	January 20, 2015	Haleakala	Pan-STARRS 1	KOR	1.1 km	MPC · JPL
673335	2015 BZ_{439}	—	March 25, 2006	Mount Lemmon	Mount Lemmon Survey	AEO	900 m	MPC · JPL
673336	2015 BD_{440}	—	March 16, 2005	Kitt Peak	Spacewatch	·	1.3 km	MPC · JPL
673337	2015 BW_{441}	—	July 16, 2004	Cerro Tololo	Deep Ecliptic Survey	·	1.4 km	MPC · JPL
673338	2015 BO_{445}	—	January 20, 2015	Haleakala	Pan-STARRS 1	·	1.1 km	MPC · JPL
673339	2015 BU_{447}	—	November 1, 2013	Catalina	CSS	·	2.1 km	MPC · JPL
673340	2015 BB_{448}	—	November 2, 2013	Mount Lemmon	Mount Lemmon Survey	·	1.4 km	MPC · JPL
673341	2015 BO_{448}	—	January 20, 2015	Haleakala	Pan-STARRS 1	·	1.4 km	MPC · JPL
673342	2015 BR_{448}	—	December 18, 2009	Mount Lemmon	Mount Lemmon Survey	·	1.6 km	MPC · JPL
673343	2015 BP_{449}	—	August 14, 2013	Haleakala	Pan-STARRS 1	(2076)	690 m	MPC · JPL
673344	2015 BH_{451}	—	September 10, 2004	Kitt Peak	Spacewatch	·	1.3 km	MPC · JPL
673345	2015 BK_{451}	—	October 28, 2013	Mount Lemmon	Mount Lemmon Survey	·	1.8 km	MPC · JPL
673346	2015 BU_{451}	—	October 7, 2004	Kitt Peak	Spacewatch	·	1.5 km	MPC · JPL
673347	2015 BG_{458}	—	April 18, 2009	Mount Lemmon	Mount Lemmon Survey	·	1.0 km	MPC · JPL
673348	2015 BM_{459}	—	April 1, 2003	Kitt Peak	Deep Ecliptic Survey	·	1.1 km	MPC · JPL
673349	2015 BU_{460}	—	January 20, 2015	Haleakala	Pan-STARRS 1	·	1.4 km	MPC · JPL
673350	2015 BX_{462}	—	January 20, 2015	Haleakala	Pan-STARRS 1	·	1.2 km	MPC · JPL
673351	2015 BY_{462}	—	November 9, 2013	Haleakala	Pan-STARRS 1	HOF	2.0 km	MPC · JPL
673352	2015 BS_{463}	—	November 26, 2005	Kitt Peak	Spacewatch	JUN	970 m	MPC · JPL
673353	2015 BR_{468}	—	January 20, 2015	Kitt Peak	Spacewatch	JUN	790 m	MPC · JPL
673354	2015 BZ_{468}	—	January 20, 2015	Kitt Peak	Spacewatch	·	1.5 km	MPC · JPL
673355	2015 BB_{476}	—	January 20, 2015	Haleakala	Pan-STARRS 1	3:2	3.9 km	MPC · JPL
673356	2015 BH_{477}	—	October 14, 2007	Kitt Peak	Spacewatch	·	1.2 km	MPC · JPL
673357	2015 BY_{478}	—	January 20, 2015	Haleakala	Pan-STARRS 1	·	1.9 km	MPC · JPL
673358	2015 BG_{479}	—	August 27, 2013	Haleakala	Pan-STARRS 1	·	900 m	MPC · JPL
673359	2015 BK_{479}	—	September 1, 2013	Haleakala	Pan-STARRS 1	V	410 m	MPC · JPL
673360	2015 BH_{486}	—	April 13, 2011	Kitt Peak	Spacewatch	·	1.2 km	MPC · JPL
673361	2015 BO_{487}	—	April 6, 2011	Mount Lemmon	Mount Lemmon Survey	·	1.8 km	MPC · JPL
673362	2015 BK_{488}	—	October 1, 2005	Mount Lemmon	Mount Lemmon Survey	·	1.2 km	MPC · JPL
673363	2015 BU_{494}	—	October 3, 2013	Haleakala	Pan-STARRS 1	·	1.5 km	MPC · JPL
673364	2015 BU_{495}	—	January 20, 2015	Haleakala	Pan-STARRS 1	·	970 m	MPC · JPL
673365	2015 BV_{497}	—	January 20, 2015	Haleakala	Pan-STARRS 1	·	1.4 km	MPC · JPL
673366	2015 BR_{498}	—	January 20, 2015	Haleakala	Pan-STARRS 1	·	1.8 km	MPC · JPL
673367	2015 BN_{502}	—	July 1, 2005	Needville	J. Dellinger, W. G. Dillon	·	1.1 km	MPC · JPL
673368	2015 BH_{515}	—	January 30, 2015	Haleakala	Pan-STARRS 1	H	520 m	MPC · JPL
673369	2015 BU_{520}	—	January 23, 2015	Haleakala	Pan-STARRS 1	H	430 m	MPC · JPL
673370	2015 BC_{530}	—	January 20, 2015	Haleakala	Pan-STARRS 1	HNS	880 m	MPC · JPL
673371	2015 BS_{532}	—	January 25, 2015	Haleakala	Pan-STARRS 1	GEF	990 m	MPC · JPL
673372	2015 BO_{535}	—	September 29, 2005	Mount Lemmon	Mount Lemmon Survey	·	940 m	MPC · JPL
673373	2015 BN_{536}	—	January 16, 2015	Haleakala	Pan-STARRS 1	EUN	860 m	MPC · JPL
673374	2015 BB_{539}	—	January 17, 2015	Mount Lemmon	Mount Lemmon Survey	PAD	1.7 km	MPC · JPL
673375	2015 BC_{539}	—	October 3, 2013	Haleakala	Pan-STARRS 1	WIT	840 m	MPC · JPL
673376	2015 BP_{544}	—	February 16, 2015	Haleakala	Pan-STARRS 1	·	1.5 km	MPC · JPL
673377	2015 BH_{546}	—	October 3, 2013	Mount Lemmon	Mount Lemmon Survey	·	1.6 km	MPC · JPL
673378	2015 BX_{547}	—	December 7, 2005	Kitt Peak	Spacewatch	·	1.5 km	MPC · JPL
673379	2015 BB_{550}	—	January 23, 2015	Haleakala	Pan-STARRS 1	EUN	1.1 km	MPC · JPL
673380	2015 BP_{551}	—	January 23, 2015	Haleakala	Pan-STARRS 1	·	1.7 km	MPC · JPL
673381	2015 BZ_{553}	—	October 7, 2005	Kitt Peak	Spacewatch	·	870 m	MPC · JPL
673382	2015 BL_{556}	—	October 18, 2009	Mount Lemmon	Mount Lemmon Survey	·	1.4 km	MPC · JPL
673383	2015 BR_{557}	—	March 6, 2008	Mount Lemmon	Mount Lemmon Survey	·	1.4 km	MPC · JPL
673384	2015 BM_{559}	—	August 18, 2009	Kitt Peak	Spacewatch	JUN	830 m	MPC · JPL
673385	2015 BQ_{559}	—	November 17, 2009	Mount Lemmon	Mount Lemmon Survey	·	1.4 km	MPC · JPL
673386	2015 BT_{559}	—	January 18, 2015	Mount Lemmon	Mount Lemmon Survey	·	1.4 km	MPC · JPL
673387	2015 BC_{564}	—	September 5, 1999	Kitt Peak	Spacewatch	·	1.5 km	MPC · JPL
673388	2015 BO_{564}	—	November 4, 2013	Mount Lemmon	Mount Lemmon Survey	AGN	910 m	MPC · JPL
673389	2015 BP_{565}	—	March 1, 2011	Mount Lemmon	Mount Lemmon Survey	·	1.1 km	MPC · JPL
673390	2015 BK_{570}	—	September 20, 2011	Haleakala	Pan-STARRS 1	·	2.5 km	MPC · JPL
673391	2015 BN_{573}	—	January 20, 2015	Haleakala	Pan-STARRS 1	·	1.1 km	MPC · JPL
673392	2015 BS_{573}	—	January 25, 2015	Haleakala	Pan-STARRS 1	·	1.4 km	MPC · JPL
673393	2015 BN_{574}	—	January 28, 2015	Haleakala	Pan-STARRS 1	LIX	2.6 km	MPC · JPL
673394	2015 BG_{575}	—	January 27, 2015	Haleakala	Pan-STARRS 1	·	1.4 km	MPC · JPL
673395	2015 BR_{575}	—	January 16, 2015	Haleakala	Pan-STARRS 1	·	1.4 km	MPC · JPL
673396	2015 BV_{577}	—	January 18, 2015	Haleakala	Pan-STARRS 1	·	1.6 km	MPC · JPL
673397	2015 BM_{580}	—	January 20, 2015	Haleakala	Pan-STARRS 1	·	1.3 km	MPC · JPL
673398	2015 BA_{581}	—	January 27, 2015	Haleakala	Pan-STARRS 1	·	2.0 km	MPC · JPL
673399	2015 BK_{581}	—	January 27, 2015	Haleakala	Pan-STARRS 1	·	1.3 km	MPC · JPL
673400	2015 BZ_{584}	—	November 10, 2009	Kitt Peak	Spacewatch	·	1.5 km	MPC · JPL

== 673401–673500 ==
back to top

Designation			Discovery			Properties		Ref
Permanent	Provisional	Named after	Date	Site	Discoverer(s)	Category	Diam.	Ref
673401	2015 BZ_{592}	—	January 27, 2015	Haleakala	Pan-STARRS 1	HNS	870 m	MPC · JPL
673402	2015 BA_{595}	—	January 29, 2015	Haleakala	Pan-STARRS 1	HOF	1.9 km	MPC · JPL
673403	2015 BP_{598}	—	January 20, 2015	Mount Lemmon	Mount Lemmon Survey	ADE	1.7 km	MPC · JPL
673404	2015 BS_{598}	—	January 24, 2015	Haleakala	Pan-STARRS 1	(194)	1.2 km	MPC · JPL
673405	2015 BZ_{598}	—	January 20, 2015	Haleakala	Pan-STARRS 1	·	1.1 km	MPC · JPL
673406	2015 BY_{599}	—	January 21, 2015	Haleakala	Pan-STARRS 1	MRX	830 m	MPC · JPL
673407	2015 BF_{600}	—	January 29, 2015	Haleakala	Pan-STARRS 1	·	1.3 km	MPC · JPL
673408	2015 BZ_{600}	—	January 19, 2015	Charleston	R. Holmes	·	1 km	MPC · JPL
673409	2015 BO_{601}	—	January 28, 2015	Haleakala	Pan-STARRS 1	·	2.4 km	MPC · JPL
673410	2015 BQ_{601}	—	January 28, 2015	Haleakala	Pan-STARRS 1	ADE	1.6 km	MPC · JPL
673411	2015 BR_{601}	—	January 20, 2015	Mount Lemmon	Mount Lemmon Survey	EUN	880 m	MPC · JPL
673412	2015 BV_{601}	—	January 26, 2015	Haleakala	Pan-STARRS 1	·	1.2 km	MPC · JPL
673413	2015 BW_{601}	—	January 27, 2015	Haleakala	Pan-STARRS 1	·	1.5 km	MPC · JPL
673414	2015 BB_{602}	—	January 28, 2015	Haleakala	Pan-STARRS 1	EUN	1.1 km	MPC · JPL
673415	2015 BL_{603}	—	January 28, 2015	Haleakala	Pan-STARRS 1	·	1.3 km	MPC · JPL
673416	2015 BW_{603}	—	January 17, 2015	Haleakala	Pan-STARRS 1	·	1.3 km	MPC · JPL
673417	2015 BR_{604}	—	September 24, 2008	Mount Lemmon	Mount Lemmon Survey	·	1.5 km	MPC · JPL
673418	2015 BZ_{604}	—	January 17, 2015	Haleakala	Pan-STARRS 1	·	1.1 km	MPC · JPL
673419	2015 BT_{612}	—	January 19, 2015	Haleakala	Pan-STARRS 1	·	1.6 km	MPC · JPL
673420	2015 BS_{613}	—	January 21, 2015	Haleakala	Pan-STARRS 1	EOS	1.5 km	MPC · JPL
673421	2015 BQ_{614}	—	January 28, 2015	Haleakala	Pan-STARRS 1	·	1.8 km	MPC · JPL
673422	2015 CE	—	December 26, 2014	Haleakala	Pan-STARRS 1	H	620 m	MPC · JPL
673423	2015 CN_{2}	—	December 21, 2014	Haleakala	Pan-STARRS 1	·	4.4 km	MPC · JPL
673424	2015 CU_{2}	—	March 12, 2002	Palomar	NEAT	·	1.3 km	MPC · JPL
673425	2015 CG_{4}	—	October 3, 2013	Haleakala	Pan-STARRS 1	·	1.2 km	MPC · JPL
673426	2015 CQ_{4}	—	January 23, 2015	Haleakala	Pan-STARRS 1	·	2.0 km	MPC · JPL
673427	2015 CM_{5}	—	September 29, 2009	Mount Lemmon	Mount Lemmon Survey	·	1.2 km	MPC · JPL
673428	2015 CD_{6}	—	December 26, 2014	Haleakala	Pan-STARRS 1	·	1.5 km	MPC · JPL
673429	2015 CC_{7}	—	September 5, 2008	Kitt Peak	Spacewatch	·	1.5 km	MPC · JPL
673430	2015 CM_{7}	—	January 22, 2015	Haleakala	Pan-STARRS 1	·	570 m	MPC · JPL
673431	2015 CL_{8}	—	February 8, 2015	Mount Lemmon	Mount Lemmon Survey	·	1.2 km	MPC · JPL
673432	2015 CX_{9}	—	October 28, 2005	Mount Lemmon	Mount Lemmon Survey	3:2 · SHU	4.3 km	MPC · JPL
673433	2015 CF_{12}	—	January 18, 2004	Palomar	NEAT	·	930 m	MPC · JPL
673434	2015 CH_{16}	—	December 31, 2000	Kitt Peak	Spacewatch	·	1.8 km	MPC · JPL
673435	2015 CZ_{16}	—	March 16, 2007	Mount Lemmon	Mount Lemmon Survey	·	1.0 km	MPC · JPL
673436	2015 CX_{19}	—	March 3, 2000	Apache Point	SDSS Collaboration	3:2	5.5 km	MPC · JPL
673437	2015 CO_{20}	—	August 15, 2013	Haleakala	Pan-STARRS 1	·	1.4 km	MPC · JPL
673438	2015 CP_{24}	—	January 27, 2011	Mount Lemmon	Mount Lemmon Survey	MAS	730 m	MPC · JPL
673439	2015 CR_{27}	—	September 24, 2012	Mount Lemmon	Mount Lemmon Survey	(1547)	1.5 km	MPC · JPL
673440	2015 CT_{27}	—	August 7, 2008	Kitt Peak	Spacewatch	(12739)	1.5 km	MPC · JPL
673441	2015 CL_{28}	—	January 30, 2011	Mount Lemmon	Mount Lemmon Survey	·	1.0 km	MPC · JPL
673442	2015 CL_{29}	—	July 30, 2008	Mount Lemmon	Mount Lemmon Survey	·	1.7 km	MPC · JPL
673443	2015 CG_{31}	—	October 3, 2013	Haleakala	Pan-STARRS 1	·	1.5 km	MPC · JPL
673444	2015 CC_{33}	—	January 19, 2015	Haleakala	Pan-STARRS 1	·	1.6 km	MPC · JPL
673445	2015 CC_{37}	—	January 17, 2015	Haleakala	Pan-STARRS 1	·	1.5 km	MPC · JPL
673446	2015 CS_{38}	—	January 17, 2015	Haleakala	Pan-STARRS 1	·	1.9 km	MPC · JPL
673447	2015 CC_{40}	—	September 16, 2009	Kitt Peak	Spacewatch	·	1.3 km	MPC · JPL
673448	2015 CG_{41}	—	February 7, 2015	Mount Lemmon	Mount Lemmon Survey	·	1.2 km	MPC · JPL
673449	2015 CO_{41}	—	August 15, 2009	Catalina	CSS	·	1.1 km	MPC · JPL
673450	2015 CX_{41}	—	April 1, 2011	Mount Lemmon	Mount Lemmon Survey	·	1.3 km	MPC · JPL
673451	2015 CV_{49}	—	March 4, 2008	Mount Lemmon	Mount Lemmon Survey	V	660 m	MPC · JPL
673452	2015 CG_{50}	—	August 28, 2006	Kitt Peak	Spacewatch	·	910 m	MPC · JPL
673453	2015 CL_{53}	—	January 19, 2015	Haleakala	Pan-STARRS 1	EUN	1.1 km	MPC · JPL
673454	2015 CO_{57}	—	May 22, 2011	Mount Lemmon	Mount Lemmon Survey	·	1.5 km	MPC · JPL
673455	2015 CY_{67}	—	January 16, 2015	Haleakala	Pan-STARRS 1	·	1.2 km	MPC · JPL
673456	2015 CK_{73}	—	February 14, 2015	Mount Lemmon	Mount Lemmon Survey	·	1.3 km	MPC · JPL
673457	2015 CH_{74}	—	February 15, 2015	Haleakala	Pan-STARRS 1	·	1.7 km	MPC · JPL
673458	2015 DO_{3}	—	January 30, 2004	Kitt Peak	Spacewatch	·	1.1 km	MPC · JPL
673459	2015 DT_{4}	—	January 24, 2015	Mount Lemmon	Mount Lemmon Survey	EUN	1.2 km	MPC · JPL
673460	2015 DR_{6}	—	October 23, 2009	Mount Lemmon	Mount Lemmon Survey	·	1.2 km	MPC · JPL
673461	2015 DM_{9}	—	December 29, 2014	Mount Lemmon	Mount Lemmon Survey	·	1.4 km	MPC · JPL
673462	2015 DL_{10}	—	November 8, 2009	Mount Lemmon	Mount Lemmon Survey	·	1.3 km	MPC · JPL
673463	2015 DC_{13}	—	February 7, 2011	Mount Lemmon	Mount Lemmon Survey	·	1.1 km	MPC · JPL
673464	2015 DG_{14}	—	March 9, 2011	Mount Lemmon	Mount Lemmon Survey	·	1.4 km	MPC · JPL
673465	2015 DH_{18}	—	October 25, 2013	Kitt Peak	Spacewatch	HOF	2.0 km	MPC · JPL
673466	2015 DL_{21}	—	January 24, 2015	Mount Lemmon	Mount Lemmon Survey	·	1.7 km	MPC · JPL
673467	2015 DT_{23}	—	February 10, 2008	Kitt Peak	Spacewatch	·	990 m	MPC · JPL
673468	2015 DX_{27}	—	November 27, 2014	Haleakala	Pan-STARRS 1	·	1.7 km	MPC · JPL
673469	2015 DX_{31}	—	September 3, 2008	Kitt Peak	Spacewatch	PAD	1.3 km	MPC · JPL
673470	2015 DR_{34}	—	February 16, 2015	Haleakala	Pan-STARRS 1	·	1.3 km	MPC · JPL
673471	2015 DC_{37}	—	February 7, 2011	Mount Lemmon	Mount Lemmon Survey	·	1.4 km	MPC · JPL
673472	2015 DQ_{43}	—	January 21, 2015	Haleakala	Pan-STARRS 1	·	1.6 km	MPC · JPL
673473	2015 DN_{47}	—	April 27, 2011	Kitt Peak	Spacewatch	·	1.5 km	MPC · JPL
673474	2015 DA_{53}	—	June 12, 2011	Mount Lemmon	Mount Lemmon Survey	·	1.4 km	MPC · JPL
673475	2015 DB_{53}	—	October 28, 2005	Kitt Peak	Spacewatch	·	1.3 km	MPC · JPL
673476	2015 DK_{54}	—	December 26, 2014	Haleakala	Pan-STARRS 1	MAR	890 m	MPC · JPL
673477	2015 DH_{56}	—	September 14, 2013	Haleakala	Pan-STARRS 1	·	1.7 km	MPC · JPL
673478	2015 DO_{56}	—	July 27, 2009	Kitt Peak	Spacewatch	·	910 m	MPC · JPL
673479	2015 DG_{57}	—	October 22, 2003	Socorro	LINEAR	·	620 m	MPC · JPL
673480	2015 DF_{59}	—	November 27, 2009	Kitt Peak	Spacewatch	·	1.3 km	MPC · JPL
673481	2015 DU_{60}	—	February 1, 2006	Mount Lemmon	Mount Lemmon Survey	AEO	820 m	MPC · JPL
673482	2015 DU_{62}	—	October 3, 2013	Haleakala	Pan-STARRS 1	·	1.3 km	MPC · JPL
673483	2015 DM_{64}	—	October 25, 2013	Mount Lemmon	Mount Lemmon Survey	·	1.1 km	MPC · JPL
673484	2015 DK_{65}	—	November 19, 2006	Kitt Peak	Spacewatch	MAS	530 m	MPC · JPL
673485	2015 DB_{67}	—	September 4, 2008	Kitt Peak	Spacewatch	AGN	1.1 km	MPC · JPL
673486	2015 DK_{68}	—	January 22, 2015	Haleakala	Pan-STARRS 1	·	1.1 km	MPC · JPL
673487	2015 DR_{70}	—	March 3, 2006	Kitt Peak	Spacewatch	·	1.5 km	MPC · JPL
673488	2015 DE_{75}	—	April 5, 2011	Kitt Peak	Spacewatch	·	1.0 km	MPC · JPL
673489	2015 DB_{76}	—	January 16, 2015	Haleakala	Pan-STARRS 1	·	950 m	MPC · JPL
673490	2015 DO_{78}	—	January 20, 2015	Haleakala	Pan-STARRS 1	·	1.3 km	MPC · JPL
673491	2015 DM_{81}	—	February 16, 2015	Haleakala	Pan-STARRS 1	·	1.4 km	MPC · JPL
673492	2015 DR_{83}	—	April 6, 2011	Mount Lemmon	Mount Lemmon Survey	·	1.3 km	MPC · JPL
673493	2015 DC_{86}	—	February 13, 2002	Kitt Peak	Spacewatch	·	1.2 km	MPC · JPL
673494	2015 DD_{86}	—	August 15, 2009	Kitt Peak	Spacewatch	·	980 m	MPC · JPL
673495	2015 DX_{86}	—	January 27, 2015	Haleakala	Pan-STARRS 1	·	1.3 km	MPC · JPL
673496	2015 DL_{91}	—	March 25, 2011	Kitt Peak	Spacewatch	·	1.4 km	MPC · JPL
673497	2015 DR_{91}	—	January 30, 2006	Kitt Peak	Spacewatch	(12739)	1.2 km	MPC · JPL
673498	2015 DM_{94}	—	October 13, 2013	Mount Lemmon	Mount Lemmon Survey	·	1.3 km	MPC · JPL
673499	2015 DK_{96}	—	August 13, 2012	Haleakala	Pan-STARRS 1	·	1.6 km	MPC · JPL
673500	2015 DS_{97}	—	September 29, 2008	Mount Lemmon	Mount Lemmon Survey	·	2.2 km	MPC · JPL

== 673501–673600 ==
back to top

Designation			Discovery			Properties		Ref
Permanent	Provisional	Named after	Date	Site	Discoverer(s)	Category	Diam.	Ref
673501	2015 DZ_{98}	—	January 19, 2007	Mauna Kea	P. A. Wiegert	NYS	1.2 km	MPC · JPL
673502	2015 DM_{99}	—	February 16, 2015	Haleakala	Pan-STARRS 1	TIN	910 m	MPC · JPL
673503	2015 DE_{101}	—	May 16, 2009	Kitt Peak	Spacewatch	V	600 m	MPC · JPL
673504	2015 DE_{102}	—	January 20, 2015	Mount Lemmon	Mount Lemmon Survey	HNS	1.0 km	MPC · JPL
673505	2015 DU_{103}	—	September 22, 2009	Kitt Peak	Spacewatch	EUN	950 m	MPC · JPL
673506	2015 DV_{106}	—	September 15, 2013	Catalina	CSS	·	2.1 km	MPC · JPL
673507	2015 DW_{107}	—	January 20, 2015	Mount Lemmon	Mount Lemmon Survey	EUN	1.0 km	MPC · JPL
673508	2015 DA_{110}	—	January 27, 2015	Haleakala	Pan-STARRS 1	·	1.7 km	MPC · JPL
673509	2015 DF_{110}	—	January 29, 2015	Haleakala	Pan-STARRS 1	·	1.5 km	MPC · JPL
673510	2015 DN_{110}	—	October 14, 2009	Catalina	CSS	EUN	1.2 km	MPC · JPL
673511	2015 DY_{110}	—	January 15, 2015	Haleakala	Pan-STARRS 1	·	1.2 km	MPC · JPL
673512	2015 DN_{112}	—	August 16, 2004	Siding Spring	SSS	(194)	1.9 km	MPC · JPL
673513	2015 DE_{114}	—	December 18, 2014	Haleakala	Pan-STARRS 1	·	1.2 km	MPC · JPL
673514	2015 DT_{114}	—	November 22, 2014	Mount Lemmon	Mount Lemmon Survey	·	1.2 km	MPC · JPL
673515	2015 DE_{115}	—	November 9, 2013	Mount Lemmon	Mount Lemmon Survey	·	1.4 km	MPC · JPL
673516	2015 DY_{119}	—	April 20, 2012	Mount Lemmon	Mount Lemmon Survey	V	650 m	MPC · JPL
673517	2015 DN_{121}	—	April 23, 1998	Kitt Peak	Spacewatch	·	1.7 km	MPC · JPL
673518	2015 DG_{123}	—	December 29, 2014	Haleakala	Pan-STARRS 1	·	1.9 km	MPC · JPL
673519	2015 DK_{133}	—	October 26, 2013	Mount Lemmon	Mount Lemmon Survey	BRA	1.2 km	MPC · JPL
673520	2015 DO_{133}	—	September 27, 2012	Haleakala	Pan-STARRS 1	L4	8.3 km	MPC · JPL
673521	2015 DZ_{136}	—	December 5, 2012	Nogales	M. Schwartz, P. R. Holvorcem	T_{j} (2.96) · 3:2	6.5 km	MPC · JPL
673522	2015 DD_{137}	—	October 5, 2013	Haleakala	Pan-STARRS 1	(18466)	1.9 km	MPC · JPL
673523	2015 DL_{137}	—	November 9, 2013	Catalina	CSS	·	1.8 km	MPC · JPL
673524	2015 DL_{138}	—	February 27, 2000	Kitt Peak	Spacewatch	·	2.5 km	MPC · JPL
673525	2015 DU_{141}	—	November 9, 2007	Kitt Peak	Spacewatch	·	630 m	MPC · JPL
673526	2015 DJ_{142}	—	October 27, 2005	Kitt Peak	Spacewatch	·	980 m	MPC · JPL
673527	2015 DV_{142}	—	January 19, 2015	Haleakala	Pan-STARRS 1	·	1.3 km	MPC · JPL
673528	2015 DM_{148}	—	August 21, 2007	Anderson Mesa	LONEOS	·	3.4 km	MPC · JPL
673529	2015 DY_{150}	—	July 31, 2001	Palomar	NEAT	·	1.4 km	MPC · JPL
673530	2015 DG_{151}	—	October 4, 2013	Mount Lemmon	Mount Lemmon Survey	·	1.4 km	MPC · JPL
673531	2015 DS_{151}	—	February 18, 2015	Mount Lemmon	Mount Lemmon Survey	·	1.6 km	MPC · JPL
673532	2015 DT_{151}	—	April 25, 2000	Kitt Peak	Spacewatch	·	1.1 km	MPC · JPL
673533	2015 DG_{153}	—	June 5, 2011	Mount Lemmon	Mount Lemmon Survey	·	1.1 km	MPC · JPL
673534	2015 DD_{154}	—	October 14, 2013	Kitt Peak	Spacewatch	·	2.1 km	MPC · JPL
673535	2015 DO_{154}	—	December 17, 2009	Mount Lemmon	Mount Lemmon Survey	·	1.6 km	MPC · JPL
673536	2015 DW_{155}	—	January 23, 2015	Haleakala	Pan-STARRS 1	H	370 m	MPC · JPL
673537	2015 DK_{157}	—	November 20, 2014	Mount Lemmon	Mount Lemmon Survey	·	1.1 km	MPC · JPL
673538	2015 DS_{157}	—	February 18, 2015	Mount Lemmon	Mount Lemmon Survey	·	1.4 km	MPC · JPL
673539	2015 DK_{163}	—	March 3, 2006	Kitt Peak	Spacewatch	·	1.5 km	MPC · JPL
673540	2015 DU_{168}	—	November 25, 2009	Mount Lemmon	Mount Lemmon Survey	·	1.4 km	MPC · JPL
673541	2015 DV_{168}	—	September 25, 2009	Catalina	CSS	EUN	1.0 km	MPC · JPL
673542	2015 DX_{168}	—	October 31, 2013	Mount Lemmon	Mount Lemmon Survey	EUN	910 m	MPC · JPL
673543	2015 DO_{170}	—	February 19, 2015	Haleakala	Pan-STARRS 1	·	1.2 km	MPC · JPL
673544	2015 DW_{170}	—	December 2, 2014	Haleakala	Pan-STARRS 1	EUN	1.1 km	MPC · JPL
673545	2015 DC_{172}	—	March 11, 2011	Kitt Peak	Spacewatch	·	1.2 km	MPC · JPL
673546	2015 DS_{172}	—	September 30, 2005	Mount Lemmon	Mount Lemmon Survey	·	1.2 km	MPC · JPL
673547	2015 DY_{174}	—	February 19, 2015	Haleakala	Pan-STARRS 1	·	1.5 km	MPC · JPL
673548	2015 DN_{176}	—	January 14, 2002	Kitt Peak	Spacewatch	·	1.3 km	MPC · JPL
673549	2015 DR_{177}	—	February 25, 2011	Catalina	CSS	JUN	1.0 km	MPC · JPL
673550	2015 DN_{180}	—	May 27, 2008	Mount Lemmon	Mount Lemmon Survey	·	1.1 km	MPC · JPL
673551	2015 DU_{181}	—	October 8, 2013	Mount Lemmon	Mount Lemmon Survey	·	1.5 km	MPC · JPL
673552	2015 DW_{181}	—	January 27, 2015	Haleakala	Pan-STARRS 1	DOR	1.6 km	MPC · JPL
673553	2015 DN_{182}	—	February 14, 2015	Mount Lemmon	Mount Lemmon Survey	·	1.4 km	MPC · JPL
673554	2015 DQ_{182}	—	March 12, 2011	Mount Lemmon	Mount Lemmon Survey	·	1.4 km	MPC · JPL
673555	2015 DD_{183}	—	January 17, 2015	Haleakala	Pan-STARRS 1	·	700 m	MPC · JPL
673556	2015 DK_{183}	—	September 12, 2007	Catalina	CSS	LIX	3.9 km	MPC · JPL
673557	2015 DQ_{183}	—	February 20, 2015	Haleakala	Pan-STARRS 1	·	1.6 km	MPC · JPL
673558	2015 DC_{185}	—	April 21, 2011	Haleakala	Pan-STARRS 1	·	1.4 km	MPC · JPL
673559	2015 DK_{188}	—	January 27, 2015	Haleakala	Pan-STARRS 1	ADE	1.3 km	MPC · JPL
673560	2015 DH_{191}	—	October 15, 2012	Mount Lemmon	Mount Lemmon Survey	·	1.4 km	MPC · JPL
673561	2015 DT_{192}	—	January 18, 2015	Kitt Peak	Spacewatch	·	1.6 km	MPC · JPL
673562	2015 DX_{192}	—	December 27, 2014	Haleakala	Pan-STARRS 1	EUN	960 m	MPC · JPL
673563	2015 DC_{193}	—	January 27, 2015	Haleakala	Pan-STARRS 1	·	1.5 km	MPC · JPL
673564	2015 DW_{195}	—	September 22, 2009	Mount Lemmon	Mount Lemmon Survey	·	1.3 km	MPC · JPL
673565	2015 DY_{197}	—	November 26, 2013	Haleakala	Pan-STARRS 1	EUN	1.0 km	MPC · JPL
673566	2015 DE_{200}	—	February 24, 2015	Haleakala	Pan-STARRS 1	APO	320 m	MPC · JPL
673567	2015 DV_{200}	—	February 23, 2007	Mount Lemmon	Mount Lemmon Survey	3:2	5.1 km	MPC · JPL
673568	2015 DS_{202}	—	January 23, 2015	Haleakala	Pan-STARRS 1	·	1.6 km	MPC · JPL
673569	2015 DM_{203}	—	October 3, 2013	Haleakala	Pan-STARRS 1	EUN	880 m	MPC · JPL
673570	2015 DJ_{205}	—	February 26, 2008	Mount Lemmon	Mount Lemmon Survey	·	630 m	MPC · JPL
673571	2015 DB_{206}	—	November 9, 2013	Haleakala	Pan-STARRS 1	·	650 m	MPC · JPL
673572	2015 DE_{207}	—	January 23, 2015	Haleakala	Pan-STARRS 1	·	1.5 km	MPC · JPL
673573	2015 DV_{207}	—	January 28, 2015	Haleakala	Pan-STARRS 1	·	2.0 km	MPC · JPL
673574	2015 DJ_{209}	—	January 28, 2015	Haleakala	Pan-STARRS 1	·	1.8 km	MPC · JPL
673575	2015 DB_{214}	—	October 24, 2013	Mount Lemmon	Mount Lemmon Survey	·	1.2 km	MPC · JPL
673576	2015 DH_{222}	—	February 25, 2006	Kitt Peak	Spacewatch	·	1.5 km	MPC · JPL
673577	2015 DR_{222}	—	March 25, 2006	Mount Lemmon	Mount Lemmon Survey	·	1.5 km	MPC · JPL
673578	2015 DY_{222}	—	January 24, 2015	Mount Lemmon	Mount Lemmon Survey	·	1.7 km	MPC · JPL
673579	2015 DB_{224}	—	March 2, 2011	Catalina	CSS	·	1.1 km	MPC · JPL
673580	2015 DR_{227}	—	February 19, 2015	Haleakala	Pan-STARRS 1	·	1.6 km	MPC · JPL
673581	2015 DD_{232}	—	February 16, 2015	Haleakala	Pan-STARRS 1	·	1.3 km	MPC · JPL
673582	2015 DE_{232}	—	October 6, 2008	Mount Lemmon	Mount Lemmon Survey	·	1.5 km	MPC · JPL
673583	2015 DX_{237}	—	January 23, 2015	Haleakala	Pan-STARRS 1	·	1.5 km	MPC · JPL
673584	2015 DR_{238}	—	January 20, 2015	Haleakala	Pan-STARRS 1	PHO	670 m	MPC · JPL
673585	2015 DC_{240}	—	January 22, 2015	Haleakala	Pan-STARRS 1	·	1.5 km	MPC · JPL
673586	2015 DV_{241}	—	February 18, 2015	Haleakala	Pan-STARRS 1	·	2.5 km	MPC · JPL
673587	2015 DA_{244}	—	March 4, 2011	Kitt Peak	Spacewatch	HNS	900 m	MPC · JPL
673588	2015 DB_{248}	—	January 23, 2015	Haleakala	Pan-STARRS 1	AEO	820 m	MPC · JPL
673589	2015 DX_{248}	—	February 17, 2015	Cerro Tololo-DECam	DECam	cubewano (hot)	127 km	MPC · JPL
673590	2015 DK_{251}	—	February 24, 2015	Haleakala	Pan-STARRS 1	EUN	1.0 km	MPC · JPL
673591	2015 DO_{251}	—	February 17, 2015	Haleakala	Pan-STARRS 1	·	1.8 km	MPC · JPL
673592	2015 DE_{252}	—	February 20, 2015	Haleakala	Pan-STARRS 1	·	1.8 km	MPC · JPL
673593	2015 DQ_{256}	—	February 20, 2015	Haleakala	Pan-STARRS 1	·	1.8 km	MPC · JPL
673594	2015 DS_{257}	—	February 23, 2015	Haleakala	Pan-STARRS 1	·	830 m	MPC · JPL
673595	2015 DZ_{266}	—	February 17, 2015	Haleakala	Pan-STARRS 1	·	1.5 km	MPC · JPL
673596	2015 DC_{267}	—	February 16, 2015	Haleakala	Pan-STARRS 1	·	2.2 km	MPC · JPL
673597	2015 DW_{267}	—	February 16, 2015	Haleakala	Pan-STARRS 1	·	1.4 km	MPC · JPL
673598	2015 DM_{268}	—	February 23, 2015	Haleakala	Pan-STARRS 1	·	1.9 km	MPC · JPL
673599	2015 DV_{268}	—	February 17, 2015	Haleakala	Pan-STARRS 1	·	1.7 km	MPC · JPL
673600	2015 DM_{270}	—	February 17, 2015	Haleakala	Pan-STARRS 1	·	1.7 km	MPC · JPL

== 673601–673700 ==
back to top

Designation			Discovery			Properties		Ref
Permanent	Provisional	Named after	Date	Site	Discoverer(s)	Category	Diam.	Ref
673601	2015 DN_{270}	—	February 18, 2015	Haleakala	Pan-STARRS 1	·	1.6 km	MPC · JPL
673602	2015 DT_{270}	—	February 16, 2015	Haleakala	Pan-STARRS 1	·	1.9 km	MPC · JPL
673603	2015 DU_{270}	—	February 23, 2015	Haleakala	Pan-STARRS 1	·	1.6 km	MPC · JPL
673604	2015 DZ_{276}	—	February 23, 2015	Haleakala	Pan-STARRS 1	GEF	1.1 km	MPC · JPL
673605	2015 DM_{277}	—	February 20, 2015	Haleakala	Pan-STARRS 1	·	1.6 km	MPC · JPL
673606	2015 DO_{280}	—	February 16, 2015	Haleakala	Pan-STARRS 1	·	1.2 km	MPC · JPL
673607	2015 DQ_{280}	—	February 27, 2015	Haleakala	Pan-STARRS 1	L4	6.9 km	MPC · JPL
673608	2015 DH_{281}	—	February 16, 2015	Haleakala	Pan-STARRS 1	·	1.3 km	MPC · JPL
673609	2015 DX_{295}	—	February 25, 2015	Haleakala	Pan-STARRS 1	·	1.7 km	MPC · JPL
673610	2015 DS_{297}	—	February 19, 2015	Haleakala	Pan-STARRS 1	·	1.1 km	MPC · JPL
673611	2015 DQ_{304}	—	February 16, 2015	Haleakala	Pan-STARRS 1	·	1.3 km	MPC · JPL
673612	2015 DY_{306}	—	February 17, 2015	Haleakala	Pan-STARRS 1	·	1.3 km	MPC · JPL
673613	2015 ED	—	April 13, 2002	Palomar	NEAT	H	590 m	MPC · JPL
673614	2015 EE_{2}	—	February 11, 2015	Kitt Peak	Spacewatch	ADE	1.7 km	MPC · JPL
673615	2015 EF_{3}	—	October 27, 2005	Mount Lemmon	Mount Lemmon Survey	·	1.1 km	MPC · JPL
673616	2015 EM_{3}	—	August 17, 2012	Haleakala	Pan-STARRS 1	EUN	950 m	MPC · JPL
673617	2015 EL_{4}	—	March 6, 2002	Palomar	NEAT	·	1.5 km	MPC · JPL
673618	2015 EP_{4}	—	October 31, 2013	Kitt Peak	Spacewatch	·	2.4 km	MPC · JPL
673619	2015 EL_{5}	—	August 23, 2008	Siding Spring	SSS	BRG	1.8 km	MPC · JPL
673620	2015 EO_{5}	—	January 23, 2015	Haleakala	Pan-STARRS 1	·	1.7 km	MPC · JPL
673621	2015 EQ_{5}	—	August 29, 2013	Haleakala	Pan-STARRS 1	H	400 m	MPC · JPL
673622	2015 EP_{6}	—	November 20, 2011	Zelenchukskaya Stn	T. V. Krjačko, Satovski, B.	H	470 m	MPC · JPL
673623	2015 EW_{7}	—	March 21, 2002	Kitt Peak	Spacewatch	EUN	1.1 km	MPC · JPL
673624	2015 ED_{13}	—	January 23, 2015	Haleakala	Pan-STARRS 1	AEO	1.1 km	MPC · JPL
673625	2015 EV_{13}	—	January 23, 2011	Mount Lemmon	Mount Lemmon Survey	·	1.2 km	MPC · JPL
673626	2015 EM_{15}	—	January 22, 2015	Haleakala	Pan-STARRS 1	·	1.4 km	MPC · JPL
673627	2015 EU_{15}	—	February 12, 2015	Haleakala	Pan-STARRS 1	·	1.4 km	MPC · JPL
673628	2015 EG_{16}	—	January 25, 2015	Haleakala	Pan-STARRS 1	HOF	2.1 km	MPC · JPL
673629	2015 EH_{17}	—	March 28, 2011	Mount Lemmon	Mount Lemmon Survey	·	2.0 km	MPC · JPL
673630	2015 EX_{19}	—	September 18, 2006	Catalina	CSS	·	990 m	MPC · JPL
673631	2015 EL_{25}	—	July 1, 2008	Kitt Peak	Spacewatch	·	1.9 km	MPC · JPL
673632	2015 EB_{26}	—	January 21, 2015	Haleakala	Pan-STARRS 1	·	820 m	MPC · JPL
673633	2015 EM_{26}	—	April 15, 2008	Mount Lemmon	Mount Lemmon Survey	·	970 m	MPC · JPL
673634	2015 ED_{29}	—	October 24, 2013	Mount Lemmon	Mount Lemmon Survey	·	1.1 km	MPC · JPL
673635	2015 EJ_{34}	—	April 25, 2003	Kitt Peak	Spacewatch	·	1.4 km	MPC · JPL
673636	2015 EN_{36}	—	March 19, 2001	Kitt Peak	Spacewatch	·	1.8 km	MPC · JPL
673637	2015 EO_{36}	—	August 14, 2012	Haleakala	Pan-STARRS 1	EUN	1.3 km	MPC · JPL
673638	2015 EE_{38}	—	November 9, 2013	Mount Lemmon	Mount Lemmon Survey	·	1.3 km	MPC · JPL
673639	2015 ES_{40}	—	February 17, 2015	Haleakala	Pan-STARRS 1	·	1.5 km	MPC · JPL
673640	2015 EE_{41}	—	February 15, 2015	Haleakala	Pan-STARRS 1	·	1.3 km	MPC · JPL
673641	2015 ED_{44}	—	February 20, 2015	Haleakala	Pan-STARRS 1	·	1.6 km	MPC · JPL
673642	2015 EM_{49}	—	August 13, 2012	Kitt Peak	Spacewatch	·	1.3 km	MPC · JPL
673643	2015 EQ_{49}	—	August 17, 2009	Kitt Peak	Spacewatch	V	570 m	MPC · JPL
673644	2015 EZ_{50}	—	December 17, 2009	Mount Lemmon	Mount Lemmon Survey	NEM	1.8 km	MPC · JPL
673645	2015 EK_{54}	—	February 11, 2015	Kitt Peak	Spacewatch	·	1.1 km	MPC · JPL
673646	2015 EX_{58}	—	January 21, 2009	Catalina	CSS	·	2.8 km	MPC · JPL
673647	2015 EC_{60}	—	October 25, 2005	Kitt Peak	Spacewatch	·	1.2 km	MPC · JPL
673648	2015 EX_{63}	—	March 20, 2015	Haleakala	Pan-STARRS 1	GAL	1.3 km	MPC · JPL
673649	2015 EW_{64}	—	April 5, 2010	Dauban	C. Rinner, Kugel, F.	·	2.7 km	MPC · JPL
673650	2015 EX_{65}	—	October 26, 2009	Mount Lemmon	Mount Lemmon Survey	·	1.4 km	MPC · JPL
673651	2015 EB_{67}	—	April 24, 2007	Kitt Peak	Spacewatch	·	1.4 km	MPC · JPL
673652	2015 ER_{67}	—	October 21, 1995	Kitt Peak	Spacewatch	·	1.8 km	MPC · JPL
673653	2015 EG_{70}	—	March 2, 2006	Kitt Peak	Spacewatch	·	1.4 km	MPC · JPL
673654	2015 ET_{73}	—	January 26, 2015	Haleakala	Pan-STARRS 1	EUN	1.2 km	MPC · JPL
673655	2015 EZ_{73}	—	March 13, 2011	Mount Lemmon	Mount Lemmon Survey	·	1.6 km	MPC · JPL
673656	2015 EE_{74}	—	January 16, 2015	Haleakala	Pan-STARRS 1	·	1.5 km	MPC · JPL
673657	2015 EU_{74}	—	March 14, 2015	Catalina	CSS	H	600 m	MPC · JPL
673658	2015 EX_{74}	—	January 2, 2012	Mount Lemmon	Mount Lemmon Survey	H	530 m	MPC · JPL
673659	2015 EV_{75}	—	August 31, 2017	Haleakala	Pan-STARRS 1	·	1.2 km	MPC · JPL
673660	2015 ED_{76}	—	March 13, 2015	Mount Lemmon	Mount Lemmon Survey	TIN	990 m	MPC · JPL
673661	2015 EO_{77}	—	March 10, 2015	Mount Lemmon	Mount Lemmon Survey	EUN	1.1 km	MPC · JPL
673662	2015 FR_{3}	—	September 16, 2009	Kitt Peak	Spacewatch	EUN	1.0 km	MPC · JPL
673663	2015 FC_{10}	—	December 13, 2013	Mount Lemmon	Mount Lemmon Survey	BRA	1.4 km	MPC · JPL
673664	2015 FL_{10}	—	February 18, 2015	Haleakala	Pan-STARRS 1	·	2.4 km	MPC · JPL
673665	2015 FP_{14}	—	October 9, 2013	Mount Lemmon	Mount Lemmon Survey	·	1.5 km	MPC · JPL
673666	2015 FX_{19}	—	November 16, 2009	Mount Lemmon	Mount Lemmon Survey	·	1.4 km	MPC · JPL
673667	2015 FX_{20}	—	December 14, 2003	Kitt Peak	Spacewatch	BRA	1.3 km	MPC · JPL
673668	2015 FX_{23}	—	March 16, 2015	Haleakala	Pan-STARRS 1	·	1.7 km	MPC · JPL
673669	2015 FA_{24}	—	November 9, 2013	Catalina	CSS	·	1.4 km	MPC · JPL
673670	2015 FN_{24}	—	May 6, 2011	Kitt Peak	Spacewatch	·	1.5 km	MPC · JPL
673671	2015 FD_{27}	—	February 23, 2015	Haleakala	Pan-STARRS 1	·	1.6 km	MPC · JPL
673672	2015 FT_{28}	—	March 16, 2015	Haleakala	Pan-STARRS 1	·	1.3 km	MPC · JPL
673673	2015 FC_{31}	—	November 10, 2013	Mount Lemmon	Mount Lemmon Survey	·	1.9 km	MPC · JPL
673674	2015 FD_{31}	—	March 10, 2015	Mount Lemmon	Mount Lemmon Survey	EUN	890 m	MPC · JPL
673675	2015 FM_{34}	—	March 18, 2015	Haleakala	Pan-STARRS 1	APO	110 m	MPC · JPL
673676	2015 FQ_{34}	—	October 24, 2009	Mount Lemmon	Mount Lemmon Survey	·	710 m	MPC · JPL
673677	2015 FF_{37}	—	March 21, 2015	Haleakala	Pan-STARRS 1	APO	560 m	MPC · JPL
673678	2015 FN_{37}	—	February 16, 2015	Haleakala	Pan-STARRS 1	·	1.8 km	MPC · JPL
673679	2015 FT_{37}	—	January 5, 2006	Mount Lemmon	Mount Lemmon Survey	·	1.3 km	MPC · JPL
673680	2015 FL_{44}	—	September 12, 2007	Mount Lemmon	Mount Lemmon Survey	·	1.9 km	MPC · JPL
673681	2015 FE_{45}	—	September 28, 2009	Mount Lemmon	Mount Lemmon Survey	L4	7.1 km	MPC · JPL
673682	2015 FJ_{46}	—	January 18, 2015	Haleakala	Pan-STARRS 1	H	430 m	MPC · JPL
673683	2015 FR_{51}	—	January 16, 2015	Haleakala	Pan-STARRS 1	·	1.3 km	MPC · JPL
673684	2015 FC_{55}	—	December 2, 2014	Haleakala	Pan-STARRS 1	·	1.9 km	MPC · JPL
673685	2015 FG_{55}	—	January 21, 2015	Haleakala	Pan-STARRS 1	·	1.2 km	MPC · JPL
673686	2015 FR_{55}	—	December 2, 2014	Haleakala	Pan-STARRS 1	·	1.8 km	MPC · JPL
673687	2015 FQ_{58}	—	January 18, 2015	Haleakala	Pan-STARRS 1	HNS	900 m	MPC · JPL
673688	2015 FR_{59}	—	October 5, 2013	Haleakala	Pan-STARRS 1	·	1.6 km	MPC · JPL
673689	2015 FH_{61}	—	January 26, 2015	Haleakala	Pan-STARRS 1	·	1.4 km	MPC · JPL
673690	2015 FG_{64}	—	January 7, 2014	Kitt Peak	Spacewatch	TIN	1.1 km	MPC · JPL
673691	2015 FB_{65}	—	March 18, 2015	Haleakala	Pan-STARRS 1	GAL	940 m	MPC · JPL
673692	2015 FB_{67}	—	January 22, 2015	Haleakala	Pan-STARRS 1	·	2.2 km	MPC · JPL
673693	2015 FJ_{68}	—	May 25, 2007	Mount Lemmon	Mount Lemmon Survey	·	2.2 km	MPC · JPL
673694	2015 FJ_{73}	—	March 17, 2015	Haleakala	Pan-STARRS 1	·	1.7 km	MPC · JPL
673695	2015 FY_{77}	—	March 18, 2015	Haleakala	Pan-STARRS 1	BRA	1.2 km	MPC · JPL
673696	2015 FN_{79}	—	March 31, 2011	Haleakala	Pan-STARRS 1	MAR	850 m	MPC · JPL
673697	2015 FR_{79}	—	November 28, 2013	Haleakala	Pan-STARRS 1	·	1.7 km	MPC · JPL
673698	2015 FJ_{88}	—	January 23, 2015	Haleakala	Pan-STARRS 1	·	740 m	MPC · JPL
673699	2015 FF_{91}	—	September 15, 2013	Mount Lemmon	Mount Lemmon Survey	·	1.2 km	MPC · JPL
673700	2015 FL_{91}	—	May 12, 2011	Mount Lemmon	Mount Lemmon Survey	·	1.5 km	MPC · JPL

== 673701–673800 ==
back to top

Designation			Discovery			Properties		Ref
Permanent	Provisional	Named after	Date	Site	Discoverer(s)	Category	Diam.	Ref
673701	2015 FE_{99}	—	January 20, 2015	Haleakala	Pan-STARRS 1	EUN	1.2 km	MPC · JPL
673702	2015 FR_{99}	—	August 12, 2012	Haleakala	Pan-STARRS 1	·	1.4 km	MPC · JPL
673703	2015 FQ_{100}	—	November 4, 2004	Catalina	CSS	·	1.5 km	MPC · JPL
673704	2015 FH_{103}	—	January 11, 2010	Mount Lemmon	Mount Lemmon Survey	·	1.5 km	MPC · JPL
673705	2015 FJ_{105}	—	August 26, 2012	Haleakala	Pan-STARRS 1	·	1.5 km	MPC · JPL
673706	2015 FK_{105}	—	March 20, 2015	Haleakala	Pan-STARRS 1	·	1.8 km	MPC · JPL
673707	2015 FL_{105}	—	October 9, 2012	Mount Lemmon	Mount Lemmon Survey	·	1.6 km	MPC · JPL
673708	2015 FV_{106}	—	March 18, 2007	Kitt Peak	Spacewatch	·	1.1 km	MPC · JPL
673709	2015 FG_{107}	—	December 3, 2005	Mauna Kea	A. Boattini	·	1.4 km	MPC · JPL
673710	2015 FD_{112}	—	March 20, 2015	Haleakala	Pan-STARRS 1	·	1.9 km	MPC · JPL
673711	2015 FP_{113}	—	January 20, 2015	Haleakala	Pan-STARRS 1	·	2.6 km	MPC · JPL
673712	2015 FK_{117}	—	January 19, 2015	Catalina	CSS	·	1.6 km	MPC · JPL
673713	2015 FQ_{117}	—	March 22, 2015	Haleakala	Pan-STARRS 1	ATE · PHA	240 m	MPC · JPL
673714	2015 FZ_{120}	—	February 16, 2015	Haleakala	Pan-STARRS 1	GEF	990 m	MPC · JPL
673715	2015 FY_{121}	—	January 23, 2015	Haleakala	Pan-STARRS 1	·	1.2 km	MPC · JPL
673716	2015 FY_{122}	—	April 6, 2011	Mount Lemmon	Mount Lemmon Survey	HNS	960 m	MPC · JPL
673717	2015 FU_{125}	—	January 23, 2015	Haleakala	Pan-STARRS 1	·	1.9 km	MPC · JPL
673718	2015 FZ_{125}	—	January 17, 2015	Haleakala	Pan-STARRS 1	JUN	940 m	MPC · JPL
673719	2015 FJ_{129}	—	November 5, 2005	Mount Lemmon	Mount Lemmon Survey	·	1.1 km	MPC · JPL
673720	2015 FA_{131}	—	September 14, 2013	Mount Lemmon	Mount Lemmon Survey	MAR	1.2 km	MPC · JPL
673721	2015 FP_{131}	—	March 15, 2011	Mount Lemmon	Mount Lemmon Survey	·	1.7 km	MPC · JPL
673722	2015 FN_{133}	—	January 15, 2015	Haleakala	Pan-STARRS 1	MAR	880 m	MPC · JPL
673723	2015 FA_{144}	—	March 21, 2015	Haleakala	Pan-STARRS 1	·	1.5 km	MPC · JPL
673724	2015 FD_{146}	—	January 23, 2015	Haleakala	Pan-STARRS 1	·	580 m	MPC · JPL
673725	2015 FB_{148}	—	September 3, 2008	Kitt Peak	Spacewatch	·	1.3 km	MPC · JPL
673726	2015 FW_{154}	—	March 21, 2015	Haleakala	Pan-STARRS 1	L4	7.1 km	MPC · JPL
673727	2015 FE_{157}	—	March 21, 2015	Haleakala	Pan-STARRS 1	·	1.4 km	MPC · JPL
673728	2015 FZ_{158}	—	October 30, 2006	Mount Lemmon	Mount Lemmon Survey	·	630 m	MPC · JPL
673729	2015 FZ_{159}	—	December 4, 2013	Haleakala	Pan-STARRS 1	·	1.4 km	MPC · JPL
673730	2015 FG_{160}	—	January 23, 2015	Haleakala	Pan-STARRS 1	·	1.6 km	MPC · JPL
673731	2015 FF_{166}	—	August 10, 2007	Kitt Peak	Spacewatch	·	2.1 km	MPC · JPL
673732	2015 FJ_{166}	—	September 15, 2009	Kitt Peak	Spacewatch	L4	8.5 km	MPC · JPL
673733	2015 FJ_{168}	—	February 21, 2007	Kitt Peak	Deep Ecliptic Survey	·	1.1 km	MPC · JPL
673734	2015 FE_{169}	—	January 23, 2015	Haleakala	Pan-STARRS 1	·	1.2 km	MPC · JPL
673735	2015 FU_{174}	—	March 21, 2015	Haleakala	Pan-STARRS 1	·	1.7 km	MPC · JPL
673736 Sanhueza	2015 FV_{178}	Sanhueza	August 23, 2008	Cerro Tololo	Vaduvescu, O.	NYS	1.4 km	MPC · JPL
673737	2015 FJ_{182}	—	December 18, 2009	Mount Lemmon	Mount Lemmon Survey	·	1.3 km	MPC · JPL
673738	2015 FV_{183}	—	September 9, 2007	Kitt Peak	Spacewatch	·	1.9 km	MPC · JPL
673739	2015 FX_{183}	—	March 22, 2015	Mount Lemmon	Mount Lemmon Survey	·	1.2 km	MPC · JPL
673740	2015 FH_{188}	—	October 31, 2013	Kitt Peak	Spacewatch	BRA	1.1 km	MPC · JPL
673741 Nikolayperov	2015 FW_{189}	Nikolayperov	July 19, 2012	Zelenchukskaya Stn	T. V. Krjačko, Satovski, B.	BRA	1.5 km	MPC · JPL
673742	2015 FZ_{193}	—	August 12, 2012	Kitt Peak	Spacewatch	·	2.6 km	MPC · JPL
673743	2015 FV_{194}	—	February 16, 2015	Haleakala	Pan-STARRS 1	·	1.7 km	MPC · JPL
673744	2015 FF_{195}	—	January 19, 2015	Haleakala	Pan-STARRS 1	·	1.4 km	MPC · JPL
673745	2015 FV_{197}	—	January 10, 2010	Kitt Peak	Spacewatch	·	2.3 km	MPC · JPL
673746	2015 FT_{200}	—	September 7, 2008	Mount Lemmon	Mount Lemmon Survey	(5)	1.3 km	MPC · JPL
673747	2015 FB_{206}	—	March 15, 2012	Kitt Peak	Spacewatch	·	800 m	MPC · JPL
673748	2015 FJ_{206}	—	September 16, 2009	Kitt Peak	Spacewatch	·	990 m	MPC · JPL
673749	2015 FM_{208}	—	April 3, 2000	Kitt Peak	Spacewatch	·	1.1 km	MPC · JPL
673750	2015 FQ_{210}	—	May 28, 2011	Mount Lemmon	Mount Lemmon Survey	·	1.2 km	MPC · JPL
673751	2015 FQ_{211}	—	September 28, 2009	Mount Lemmon	Mount Lemmon Survey	L4	6.8 km	MPC · JPL
673752	2015 FO_{212}	—	October 21, 2012	Haleakala	Pan-STARRS 1	·	1.9 km	MPC · JPL
673753	2015 FH_{213}	—	November 28, 2013	Mount Lemmon	Mount Lemmon Survey	·	1.7 km	MPC · JPL
673754	2015 FN_{214}	—	November 21, 2008	Mount Lemmon	Mount Lemmon Survey	·	1.7 km	MPC · JPL
673755	2015 FQ_{216}	—	May 2, 2003	Kitt Peak	Spacewatch	·	1.8 km	MPC · JPL
673756	2015 FS_{219}	—	March 16, 2015	Mount Lemmon	Mount Lemmon Survey	·	1.4 km	MPC · JPL
673757	2015 FK_{220}	—	November 8, 2013	Kitt Peak	Spacewatch	·	1.5 km	MPC · JPL
673758	2015 FZ_{221}	—	January 21, 2015	Haleakala	Pan-STARRS 1	·	1.8 km	MPC · JPL
673759	2015 FG_{222}	—	March 23, 2015	Haleakala	Pan-STARRS 1	·	1.6 km	MPC · JPL
673760	2015 FO_{223}	—	November 6, 2013	Kitt Peak	Spacewatch	·	1.4 km	MPC · JPL
673761	2015 FP_{223}	—	March 23, 2015	Haleakala	Pan-STARRS 1	·	1.5 km	MPC · JPL
673762	2015 FG_{225}	—	March 23, 2015	Haleakala	Pan-STARRS 1	·	1.4 km	MPC · JPL
673763	2015 FR_{227}	—	March 23, 2015	Haleakala	Pan-STARRS 1	·	1.2 km	MPC · JPL
673764	2015 FC_{228}	—	April 22, 2007	Mount Lemmon	Mount Lemmon Survey	·	1.3 km	MPC · JPL
673765	2015 FC_{229}	—	March 26, 2007	Kitt Peak	Spacewatch	·	1.2 km	MPC · JPL
673766	2015 FD_{230}	—	September 6, 1996	Kitt Peak	Spacewatch	EUN	1.2 km	MPC · JPL
673767	2015 FE_{232}	—	April 23, 2011	Haleakala	Pan-STARRS 1	·	1.5 km	MPC · JPL
673768	2015 FG_{234}	—	November 5, 2005	Mount Lemmon	Mount Lemmon Survey	NYS	1.3 km	MPC · JPL
673769	2015 FU_{234}	—	September 25, 2009	Kitt Peak	Spacewatch	L4	7.0 km	MPC · JPL
673770	2015 FN_{239}	—	January 21, 2015	Haleakala	Pan-STARRS 1	·	1.7 km	MPC · JPL
673771	2015 FB_{240}	—	February 18, 2015	Haleakala	Pan-STARRS 1	MRX	660 m	MPC · JPL
673772	2015 FX_{240}	—	August 17, 2012	Haleakala	Pan-STARRS 1	·	1.6 km	MPC · JPL
673773	2015 FR_{243}	—	March 23, 2015	Haleakala	Pan-STARRS 1	HOF	2.1 km	MPC · JPL
673774	2015 FY_{245}	—	January 10, 2010	Kitt Peak	Spacewatch	·	1.8 km	MPC · JPL
673775	2015 FG_{246}	—	July 1, 2011	Mount Lemmon	Mount Lemmon Survey	·	1.7 km	MPC · JPL
673776	2015 FA_{247}	—	December 31, 2013	Mount Lemmon	Mount Lemmon Survey	·	2.3 km	MPC · JPL
673777	2015 FW_{247}	—	March 23, 2015	Haleakala	Pan-STARRS 1	·	1.0 km	MPC · JPL
673778	2015 FQ_{249}	—	March 23, 2015	Haleakala	Pan-STARRS 1	(13314)	1.4 km	MPC · JPL
673779	2015 FJ_{250}	—	February 16, 2015	Haleakala	Pan-STARRS 1	·	830 m	MPC · JPL
673780	2015 FN_{250}	—	April 5, 2008	Mount Lemmon	Mount Lemmon Survey	·	1.1 km	MPC · JPL
673781	2015 FZ_{251}	—	September 17, 2012	Mount Lemmon	Mount Lemmon Survey	·	1.4 km	MPC · JPL
673782	2015 FV_{257}	—	October 20, 1995	Kitt Peak	Spacewatch	·	2.0 km	MPC · JPL
673783	2015 FF_{258}	—	August 10, 2007	Kitt Peak	Spacewatch	·	1.6 km	MPC · JPL
673784	2015 FW_{259}	—	March 24, 2015	Haleakala	Pan-STARRS 1	·	1.8 km	MPC · JPL
673785	2015 FQ_{260}	—	December 15, 2009	Mount Lemmon	Mount Lemmon Survey	·	1.6 km	MPC · JPL
673786	2015 FM_{261}	—	November 12, 2013	Kitt Peak	Spacewatch	AGN	990 m	MPC · JPL
673787	2015 FT_{262}	—	February 4, 2006	Kitt Peak	Spacewatch	·	1.5 km	MPC · JPL
673788	2015 FL_{264}	—	January 21, 2015	Haleakala	Pan-STARRS 1	·	1.4 km	MPC · JPL
673789	2015 FE_{265}	—	February 16, 2015	Haleakala	Pan-STARRS 1	·	1.3 km	MPC · JPL
673790	2015 FN_{273}	—	January 21, 2015	Haleakala	Pan-STARRS 1	DOR	1.5 km	MPC · JPL
673791	2015 FB_{274}	—	January 24, 2015	Mount Lemmon	Mount Lemmon Survey	·	2.0 km	MPC · JPL
673792	2015 FP_{274}	—	January 7, 2010	Mount Lemmon	Mount Lemmon Survey	MRX	730 m	MPC · JPL
673793	2015 FW_{276}	—	December 29, 2014	Haleakala	Pan-STARRS 1	·	1.5 km	MPC · JPL
673794	2015 FT_{280}	—	May 13, 2011	Kitt Peak	Spacewatch	·	1.6 km	MPC · JPL
673795	2015 FS_{281}	—	January 25, 2015	Haleakala	Pan-STARRS 1	(194)	1.4 km	MPC · JPL
673796	2015 FP_{282}	—	February 18, 2015	Haleakala	Pan-STARRS 1	·	1.3 km	MPC · JPL
673797	2015 FT_{285}	—	January 23, 2015	Haleakala	Pan-STARRS 1	·	1.7 km	MPC · JPL
673798	2015 FN_{286}	—	June 25, 2011	Kitt Peak	Spacewatch	·	1.6 km	MPC · JPL
673799	2015 FW_{286}	—	March 26, 2011	Haleakala	Pan-STARRS 1	PHO	920 m	MPC · JPL
673800	2015 FL_{288}	—	April 9, 2003	Palomar	NEAT	·	1.2 km	MPC · JPL

== 673801–673900 ==
back to top

Designation			Discovery			Properties		Ref
Permanent	Provisional	Named after	Date	Site	Discoverer(s)	Category	Diam.	Ref
673801	2015 FV_{290}	—	January 21, 2015	Haleakala	Pan-STARRS 1	·	1.9 km	MPC · JPL
673802	2015 FO_{291}	—	October 25, 2013	Catalina	CSS	·	2.3 km	MPC · JPL
673803	2015 FX_{291}	—	March 27, 2015	Mount Lemmon	Mount Lemmon Survey	·	2.6 km	MPC · JPL
673804	2015 FP_{293}	—	March 27, 2015	Mount Lemmon	Mount Lemmon Survey	GAL	1.5 km	MPC · JPL
673805	2015 FT_{293}	—	May 25, 2006	Kitt Peak	Spacewatch	·	1.8 km	MPC · JPL
673806	2015 FS_{294}	—	January 28, 2015	Haleakala	Pan-STARRS 1	·	1.8 km	MPC · JPL
673807	2015 FM_{296}	—	March 28, 2015	Haleakala	Pan-STARRS 1	·	1.5 km	MPC · JPL
673808	2015 FT_{296}	—	January 28, 2015	Haleakala	Pan-STARRS 1	·	2.1 km	MPC · JPL
673809	2015 FU_{296}	—	December 30, 2008	Mount Lemmon	Mount Lemmon Survey	·	1.6 km	MPC · JPL
673810	2015 FX_{296}	—	June 3, 2011	Nogales	M. Schwartz, P. R. Holvorcem	ADE	2.3 km	MPC · JPL
673811	2015 FQ_{298}	—	April 25, 2007	Mount Lemmon	Mount Lemmon Survey	·	1.2 km	MPC · JPL
673812	2015 FX_{298}	—	July 2, 2011	Mount Lemmon	Mount Lemmon Survey	·	2.5 km	MPC · JPL
673813	2015 FE_{301}	—	April 27, 2011	Mount Lemmon	Mount Lemmon Survey	·	1.7 km	MPC · JPL
673814	2015 FR_{303}	—	March 28, 2015	Haleakala	Pan-STARRS 1	·	1.8 km	MPC · JPL
673815	2015 FT_{303}	—	March 28, 2015	Haleakala	Pan-STARRS 1	·	1.6 km	MPC · JPL
673816	2015 FT_{305}	—	October 15, 2012	Haleakala	Pan-STARRS 1	MRX	860 m	MPC · JPL
673817	2015 FU_{306}	—	October 17, 2012	Mount Lemmon	Mount Lemmon Survey	·	1.6 km	MPC · JPL
673818	2015 FX_{308}	—	March 25, 2015	Haleakala	Pan-STARRS 1	·	2.0 km	MPC · JPL
673819	2015 FQ_{310}	—	October 7, 2012	Haleakala	Pan-STARRS 1	·	1.8 km	MPC · JPL
673820	2015 FO_{312}	—	May 7, 2002	Palomar	NEAT	·	1.8 km	MPC · JPL
673821	2015 FA_{315}	—	October 22, 2005	Palomar	NEAT	·	1.3 km	MPC · JPL
673822	2015 FS_{318}	—	May 8, 2006	Kitt Peak	Spacewatch	·	2.1 km	MPC · JPL
673823	2015 FL_{321}	—	March 25, 2015	Haleakala	Pan-STARRS 1	·	1.6 km	MPC · JPL
673824	2015 FR_{323}	—	May 23, 2011	Nogales	M. Schwartz, P. R. Holvorcem	ADE	1.8 km	MPC · JPL
673825	2015 FU_{325}	—	June 10, 2011	Mount Lemmon	Mount Lemmon Survey	·	1.8 km	MPC · JPL
673826	2015 FU_{326}	—	January 23, 2015	Haleakala	Pan-STARRS 1	·	2.3 km	MPC · JPL
673827	2015 FW_{326}	—	October 23, 2003	Kitt Peak	Deep Ecliptic Survey	GEF	1.0 km	MPC · JPL
673828	2015 FS_{327}	—	December 5, 2008	Mount Lemmon	Mount Lemmon Survey	·	1.6 km	MPC · JPL
673829	2015 FR_{329}	—	March 25, 2015	Haleakala	Pan-STARRS 1	·	1.8 km	MPC · JPL
673830	2015 FV_{331}	—	September 4, 2011	Kitt Peak	Spacewatch	·	2.3 km	MPC · JPL
673831	2015 FX_{332}	—	February 26, 2015	Haleakala	Pan-STARRS 1	EUN	1.3 km	MPC · JPL
673832	2015 FB_{335}	—	January 9, 2014	Kitt Peak	Spacewatch	·	1.8 km	MPC · JPL
673833	2015 FQ_{335}	—	October 9, 2012	Charleston	R. Holmes	·	2.0 km	MPC · JPL
673834	2015 FW_{336}	—	March 30, 2015	Haleakala	Pan-STARRS 1	·	970 m	MPC · JPL
673835	2015 FJ_{338}	—	April 29, 2006	Kitt Peak	Spacewatch	·	1.6 km	MPC · JPL
673836	2015 FZ_{341}	—	January 21, 2015	Haleakala	Pan-STARRS 1	·	1.7 km	MPC · JPL
673837	2015 FT_{342}	—	October 22, 2003	Apache Point	SDSS Collaboration	GEF	1.4 km	MPC · JPL
673838	2015 FG_{343}	—	February 8, 2007	Palomar	NEAT	·	1.3 km	MPC · JPL
673839	2015 FL_{344}	—	March 29, 2011	Kitt Peak	Spacewatch	HNS	1.3 km	MPC · JPL
673840	2015 FK_{346}	—	April 2, 2011	Mount Lemmon	Mount Lemmon Survey	JUN	810 m	MPC · JPL
673841	2015 FT_{347}	—	January 9, 2014	Mount Lemmon	Mount Lemmon Survey	·	1.8 km	MPC · JPL
673842	2015 FH_{348}	—	March 16, 2015	Haleakala	Pan-STARRS 1	·	1.4 km	MPC · JPL
673843	2015 FH_{350}	—	December 13, 2013	Mount Lemmon	Mount Lemmon Survey	·	1.6 km	MPC · JPL
673844	2015 FD_{353}	—	March 17, 2015	Haleakala	Pan-STARRS 1	·	1.5 km	MPC · JPL
673845	2015 FC_{358}	—	February 8, 2013	Haleakala	Pan-STARRS 1	L4	6.7 km	MPC · JPL
673846	2015 FK_{358}	—	October 22, 2006	Catalina	CSS	·	670 m	MPC · JPL
673847	2015 FM_{360}	—	October 15, 2007	Mount Lemmon	Mount Lemmon Survey	·	1.8 km	MPC · JPL
673848	2015 FR_{360}	—	March 17, 2015	Haleakala	Pan-STARRS 1	L4	7.3 km	MPC · JPL
673849	2015 FK_{362}	—	March 17, 2015	Haleakala	Pan-STARRS 1	·	1.8 km	MPC · JPL
673850	2015 FC_{370}	—	March 18, 2015	Haleakala	Pan-STARRS 1	·	2.2 km	MPC · JPL
673851	2015 FE_{373}	—	August 30, 2002	Kitt Peak	Spacewatch	PHO	780 m	MPC · JPL
673852	2015 FL_{373}	—	August 26, 2005	Palomar	NEAT	H	580 m	MPC · JPL
673853	2015 FN_{373}	—	March 18, 2015	Haleakala	Pan-STARRS 1	L4	8.0 km	MPC · JPL
673854	2015 FX_{373}	—	October 15, 2012	Haleakala	Pan-STARRS 1	·	1.6 km	MPC · JPL
673855	2015 FR_{376}	—	September 23, 2008	Kitt Peak	Spacewatch	·	1.5 km	MPC · JPL
673856	2015 FW_{380}	—	January 23, 2015	Haleakala	Pan-STARRS 1	·	1.3 km	MPC · JPL
673857	2015 FQ_{383}	—	July 31, 2005	Palomar	NEAT	·	1.4 km	MPC · JPL
673858	2015 FL_{385}	—	October 30, 2013	ASC-Kislovodsk	ASC-Kislovodsk	EUN	1.1 km	MPC · JPL
673859	2015 FG_{390}	—	March 20, 2015	Haleakala	Pan-STARRS 1	·	1.8 km	MPC · JPL
673860	2015 FO_{390}	—	January 23, 2015	Haleakala	Pan-STARRS 1	HNS	860 m	MPC · JPL
673861	2015 FW_{393}	—	March 31, 2015	Haleakala	Pan-STARRS 1	H	450 m	MPC · JPL
673862	2015 FE_{396}	—	March 30, 2015	Haleakala	Pan-STARRS 1	·	1.6 km	MPC · JPL
673863	2015 FQ_{404}	—	July 27, 2011	Haleakala	Pan-STARRS 1	·	1.5 km	MPC · JPL
673864	2015 FQ_{406}	—	March 18, 2015	Haleakala	Pan-STARRS 1	·	3.1 km	MPC · JPL
673865	2015 FE_{408}	—	May 25, 2006	Mount Lemmon	Mount Lemmon Survey	·	1.4 km	MPC · JPL
673866	2015 FR_{408}	—	March 21, 2015	Haleakala	Pan-STARRS 1	(18466)	1.8 km	MPC · JPL
673867	2015 FX_{410}	—	December 7, 2013	Kitt Peak	Spacewatch	·	2.6 km	MPC · JPL
673868	2015 FQ_{415}	—	March 28, 2015	Haleakala	Pan-STARRS 1	·	1.9 km	MPC · JPL
673869	2015 FM_{416}	—	July 4, 2016	Haleakala	Pan-STARRS 1	EOS	1.6 km	MPC · JPL
673870	2015 FL_{417}	—	March 24, 2015	Haleakala	Pan-STARRS 1	EUN	840 m	MPC · JPL
673871	2015 FB_{421}	—	March 28, 2015	Haleakala	Pan-STARRS 1	·	730 m	MPC · JPL
673872	2015 FF_{422}	—	March 24, 2015	Haleakala	Pan-STARRS 1	·	1.8 km	MPC · JPL
673873	2015 FF_{423}	—	July 14, 2016	Haleakala	Pan-STARRS 1	·	2.1 km	MPC · JPL
673874	2015 FK_{425}	—	March 22, 2015	Haleakala	Pan-STARRS 1	·	1.6 km	MPC · JPL
673875	2015 FR_{427}	—	March 18, 2015	Haleakala	Pan-STARRS 1	·	580 m	MPC · JPL
673876	2015 FW_{433}	—	March 30, 2015	Haleakala	Pan-STARRS 1	·	1.8 km	MPC · JPL
673877	2015 FE_{436}	—	March 19, 2015	Haleakala	Pan-STARRS 1	·	1.6 km	MPC · JPL
673878	2015 FG_{436}	—	March 21, 2015	Haleakala	Pan-STARRS 1	·	1.6 km	MPC · JPL
673879	2015 FO_{442}	—	March 22, 2015	Haleakala	Pan-STARRS 1	PHO	880 m	MPC · JPL
673880	2015 FT_{448}	—	March 28, 2015	Haleakala	Pan-STARRS 1	·	1.5 km	MPC · JPL
673881	2015 FH_{453}	—	March 28, 2015	Haleakala	Pan-STARRS 1	·	1.8 km	MPC · JPL
673882	2015 FX_{459}	—	March 17, 2015	Mount Lemmon	Mount Lemmon Survey	·	1.3 km	MPC · JPL
673883	2015 FH_{465}	—	March 22, 2015	Mount Lemmon	Mount Lemmon Survey	·	1.1 km	MPC · JPL
673884	2015 GV_{1}	—	June 12, 2012	Mount Lemmon	Mount Lemmon Survey	·	1.1 km	MPC · JPL
673885	2015 GB_{2}	—	September 27, 2013	Haleakala	Pan-STARRS 1	V	660 m	MPC · JPL
673886	2015 GV_{2}	—	January 21, 2015	Haleakala	Pan-STARRS 1	·	1.4 km	MPC · JPL
673887	2015 GR_{3}	—	March 29, 2015	Haleakala	Pan-STARRS 1	GEF	880 m	MPC · JPL
673888	2015 GB_{5}	—	March 25, 2015	Mount Lemmon	Mount Lemmon Survey	·	1.7 km	MPC · JPL
673889	2015 GE_{5}	—	April 10, 2005	Kitt Peak	Deep Ecliptic Survey	·	1.6 km	MPC · JPL
673890	2015 GY_{7}	—	February 17, 2015	Haleakala	Pan-STARRS 1	·	1.9 km	MPC · JPL
673891	2015 GC_{10}	—	December 29, 2014	Haleakala	Pan-STARRS 1	·	2.0 km	MPC · JPL
673892	2015 GM_{10}	—	April 30, 2011	Haleakala	Pan-STARRS 1	526	2.0 km	MPC · JPL
673893	2015 GO_{16}	—	January 28, 2015	Haleakala	Pan-STARRS 1	·	1.8 km	MPC · JPL
673894	2015 GG_{19}	—	October 19, 2003	Kitt Peak	Spacewatch	·	2.0 km	MPC · JPL
673895	2015 GN_{19}	—	March 22, 2015	Haleakala	Pan-STARRS 1	·	1.5 km	MPC · JPL
673896	2015 GQ_{19}	—	April 11, 2015	Mount Lemmon	Mount Lemmon Survey	L4	6.1 km	MPC · JPL
673897	2015 GC_{23}	—	February 5, 2010	Kitt Peak	Spacewatch	·	1.2 km	MPC · JPL
673898	2015 GF_{23}	—	January 11, 2003	Kitt Peak	Spacewatch	PHO	1.1 km	MPC · JPL
673899	2015 GK_{26}	—	February 23, 2015	Haleakala	Pan-STARRS 1	·	1.6 km	MPC · JPL
673900	2015 GB_{27}	—	April 12, 2015	Haleakala	Pan-STARRS 1	TIN	1.2 km	MPC · JPL

== 673901–674000 ==
back to top

Designation			Discovery			Properties		Ref
Permanent	Provisional	Named after	Date	Site	Discoverer(s)	Category	Diam.	Ref
673901	2015 GV_{27}	—	December 19, 2014	Haleakala	Pan-STARRS 1	GAL	1.4 km	MPC · JPL
673902	2015 GE_{28}	—	March 23, 2015	Mount Lemmon	Mount Lemmon Survey	GEF	1.0 km	MPC · JPL
673903	2015 GX_{31}	—	March 29, 2015	Haleakala	Pan-STARRS 1	·	1.4 km	MPC · JPL
673904	2015 GZ_{33}	—	July 5, 2005	Palomar	NEAT	·	2.4 km	MPC · JPL
673905	2015 GR_{34}	—	November 20, 2009	Mount Lemmon	Mount Lemmon Survey	GAL	1.1 km	MPC · JPL
673906	2015 GT_{34}	—	January 23, 2015	Haleakala	Pan-STARRS 1	·	1.8 km	MPC · JPL
673907	2015 GX_{34}	—	September 21, 2003	Kitt Peak	Spacewatch	NEM	2.2 km	MPC · JPL
673908	2015 GJ_{44}	—	March 25, 2015	Haleakala	Pan-STARRS 1	·	1.8 km	MPC · JPL
673909	2015 GN_{47}	—	March 27, 2015	Haleakala	Pan-STARRS 1	·	1.7 km	MPC · JPL
673910	2015 GU_{52}	—	March 19, 2015	Haleakala	Pan-STARRS 1	·	1.5 km	MPC · JPL
673911	2015 GG_{53}	—	May 26, 2011	Bergisch Gladbach	W. Bickel	MAR	1.1 km	MPC · JPL
673912	2015 GZ_{59}	—	April 11, 2015	Mount Lemmon	Mount Lemmon Survey	·	1.2 km	MPC · JPL
673913	2015 GF_{63}	—	April 15, 2015	Mount Lemmon	Mount Lemmon Survey	·	1.5 km	MPC · JPL
673914	2015 GU_{64}	—	April 9, 2015	Mount Lemmon	Mount Lemmon Survey	·	2.5 km	MPC · JPL
673915	2015 HC	—	January 23, 2015	Haleakala	Pan-STARRS 1	·	410 m	MPC · JPL
673916	2015 HF_{2}	—	December 2, 2014	Haleakala	Pan-STARRS 1	·	1.4 km	MPC · JPL
673917	2015 HL_{2}	—	October 27, 2009	Kitt Peak	Spacewatch	·	1.3 km	MPC · JPL
673918	2015 HH_{4}	—	May 1, 2003	Kitt Peak	Spacewatch	·	1.6 km	MPC · JPL
673919	2015 HE_{7}	—	March 13, 2011	Kitt Peak	Spacewatch	·	1.3 km	MPC · JPL
673920	2015 HK_{7}	—	June 6, 2011	Haleakala	Pan-STARRS 1	·	1.8 km	MPC · JPL
673921	2015 HR_{7}	—	March 19, 2010	Mount Lemmon	Mount Lemmon Survey	H	410 m	MPC · JPL
673922	2015 HF_{15}	—	February 17, 2004	Kitt Peak	Spacewatch	·	850 m	MPC · JPL
673923	2015 HP_{18}	—	February 25, 2006	Kitt Peak	Spacewatch	·	1.6 km	MPC · JPL
673924	2015 HR_{19}	—	March 24, 2006	Mount Lemmon	Mount Lemmon Survey	·	1.7 km	MPC · JPL
673925	2015 HD_{22}	—	March 15, 2015	Kitt Peak	Spacewatch	·	1.5 km	MPC · JPL
673926	2015 HE_{22}	—	October 28, 2008	Kitt Peak	Spacewatch	·	1.7 km	MPC · JPL
673927	2015 HS_{23}	—	November 7, 2012	Haleakala	Pan-STARRS 1	·	1.9 km	MPC · JPL
673928	2015 HR_{25}	—	October 21, 2012	Haleakala	Pan-STARRS 1	·	2.2 km	MPC · JPL
673929	2015 HW_{25}	—	March 21, 2015	Haleakala	Pan-STARRS 1	·	1.6 km	MPC · JPL
673930	2015 HB_{26}	—	August 26, 2012	Haleakala	Pan-STARRS 1	·	1.2 km	MPC · JPL
673931	2015 HA_{27}	—	August 10, 2007	Kitt Peak	Spacewatch	AGN	1.1 km	MPC · JPL
673932	2015 HC_{28}	—	September 6, 2008	Kitt Peak	Spacewatch	·	810 m	MPC · JPL
673933	2015 HO_{28}	—	September 28, 2003	Apache Point	SDSS Collaboration	·	1.7 km	MPC · JPL
673934	2015 HS_{28}	—	April 10, 2015	Kitt Peak	Spacewatch	·	1.5 km	MPC · JPL
673935	2015 HF_{29}	—	April 9, 2010	Mount Lemmon	Mount Lemmon Survey	·	1.6 km	MPC · JPL
673936	2015 HE_{31}	—	October 8, 2012	Haleakala	Pan-STARRS 1	·	1.9 km	MPC · JPL
673937	2015 HS_{34}	—	March 15, 2007	Mount Lemmon	Mount Lemmon Survey	·	1.2 km	MPC · JPL
673938	2015 HY_{35}	—	April 12, 2002	Palomar	NEAT	·	1.9 km	MPC · JPL
673939	2015 HF_{36}	—	March 20, 2015	Haleakala	Pan-STARRS 1	·	1.4 km	MPC · JPL
673940	2015 HE_{43}	—	September 3, 2013	Catalina	CSS	H	410 m	MPC · JPL
673941	2015 HH_{46}	—	December 4, 2013	Haleakala	Pan-STARRS 1	·	1.9 km	MPC · JPL
673942	2015 HX_{47}	—	November 1, 2008	Mount Lemmon	Mount Lemmon Survey	·	1.7 km	MPC · JPL
673943	2015 HZ_{47}	—	March 25, 2015	Haleakala	Pan-STARRS 1	EOS	1.6 km	MPC · JPL
673944	2015 HT_{49}	—	April 16, 2015	Haleakala	Pan-STARRS 1	·	1.8 km	MPC · JPL
673945	2015 HF_{51}	—	November 19, 2008	Kitt Peak	Spacewatch	·	1.7 km	MPC · JPL
673946	2015 HR_{51}	—	February 17, 2010	Kitt Peak	Spacewatch	·	1.6 km	MPC · JPL
673947	2015 HH_{53}	—	April 25, 2008	Kitt Peak	Spacewatch	V	680 m	MPC · JPL
673948	2015 HW_{54}	—	March 21, 2015	Haleakala	Pan-STARRS 1	·	1.6 km	MPC · JPL
673949	2015 HE_{58}	—	September 1, 2011	Haleakala	Pan-STARRS 1	·	1.9 km	MPC · JPL
673950	2015 HO_{58}	—	April 18, 2015	Haleakala	Pan-STARRS 1	·	1.5 km	MPC · JPL
673951	2015 HW_{58}	—	January 30, 2006	Kitt Peak	Spacewatch	·	1.1 km	MPC · JPL
673952	2015 HY_{58}	—	April 18, 2015	Haleakala	Pan-STARRS 1	·	490 m	MPC · JPL
673953	2015 HZ_{58}	—	October 22, 2012	Haleakala	Pan-STARRS 1	·	1.4 km	MPC · JPL
673954	2015 HN_{61}	—	September 24, 2011	Haleakala	Pan-STARRS 1	·	1.8 km	MPC · JPL
673955	2015 HH_{62}	—	April 10, 2015	Kitt Peak	Spacewatch	·	2.2 km	MPC · JPL
673956	2015 HK_{65}	—	October 17, 2012	Haleakala	Pan-STARRS 1	·	1.7 km	MPC · JPL
673957	2015 HY_{65}	—	September 15, 2007	Kitt Peak	Spacewatch	·	1.5 km	MPC · JPL
673958	2015 HH_{67}	—	April 23, 2015	Haleakala	Pan-STARRS 1	·	1.7 km	MPC · JPL
673959	2015 HU_{70}	—	October 9, 2007	Mount Lemmon	Mount Lemmon Survey	·	1.3 km	MPC · JPL
673960	2015 HL_{71}	—	April 8, 2006	Kitt Peak	Spacewatch	·	1.7 km	MPC · JPL
673961	2015 HZ_{74}	—	April 19, 2015	Mount Lemmon	Mount Lemmon Survey	·	690 m	MPC · JPL
673962	2015 HR_{77}	—	August 14, 2012	Kitt Peak	Spacewatch	·	860 m	MPC · JPL
673963	2015 HE_{80}	—	May 29, 2009	Mount Lemmon	Mount Lemmon Survey	·	750 m	MPC · JPL
673964	2015 HT_{88}	—	April 23, 2015	Haleakala	Pan-STARRS 1	·	1.8 km	MPC · JPL
673965	2015 HB_{92}	—	March 16, 2005	Kitt Peak	Spacewatch	KOR	1.2 km	MPC · JPL
673966	2015 HS_{92}	—	May 25, 2006	Kitt Peak	Spacewatch	·	1.8 km	MPC · JPL
673967	2015 HE_{93}	—	April 20, 2010	Kitt Peak	Spacewatch	KOR	1.4 km	MPC · JPL
673968	2015 HH_{96}	—	May 12, 2007	Lulin	LUSS	·	1.1 km	MPC · JPL
673969	2015 HL_{96}	—	November 13, 2012	Bergisch Gladbach	W. Bickel	·	1.2 km	MPC · JPL
673970	2015 HB_{97}	—	October 11, 2002	Palomar	NEAT	·	1 km	MPC · JPL
673971	2015 HA_{101}	—	October 23, 2004	Kitt Peak	Spacewatch	·	1.4 km	MPC · JPL
673972	2015 HZ_{102}	—	November 13, 2007	Kitt Peak	Spacewatch	KOR	1.1 km	MPC · JPL
673973	2015 HG_{103}	—	August 14, 2012	Haleakala	Pan-STARRS 1	·	2.0 km	MPC · JPL
673974	2015 HX_{103}	—	January 13, 2010	Mount Lemmon	Mount Lemmon Survey	·	1.5 km	MPC · JPL
673975	2015 HQ_{104}	—	January 25, 2009	Kitt Peak	Spacewatch	·	1.9 km	MPC · JPL
673976	2015 HK_{106}	—	November 26, 2013	Haleakala	Pan-STARRS 1	·	1.4 km	MPC · JPL
673977	2015 HT_{111}	—	April 23, 2015	Haleakala	Pan-STARRS 1	·	1.6 km	MPC · JPL
673978	2015 HH_{112}	—	December 28, 2013	Mount Lemmon	Mount Lemmon Survey	EUN	1.2 km	MPC · JPL
673979	2015 HX_{117}	—	October 1, 2005	Mount Lemmon	Mount Lemmon Survey	·	1.1 km	MPC · JPL
673980	2015 HM_{122}	—	April 23, 2015	Haleakala	Pan-STARRS 1	AGN	910 m	MPC · JPL
673981	2015 HH_{125}	—	October 25, 2009	Kitt Peak	Spacewatch	L4	7.5 km	MPC · JPL
673982	2015 HC_{129}	—	October 17, 2012	Mount Lemmon	Mount Lemmon Survey	KOR	1.1 km	MPC · JPL
673983	2015 HY_{131}	—	November 15, 1995	Kitt Peak	Spacewatch	V	440 m	MPC · JPL
673984	2015 HG_{132}	—	September 18, 2003	Kitt Peak	Spacewatch	·	1.5 km	MPC · JPL
673985	2015 HT_{135}	—	October 7, 2012	Haleakala	Pan-STARRS 1	GEF	1.2 km	MPC · JPL
673986	2015 HK_{136}	—	August 23, 2011	Mayhill-ISON	L. Elenin	KOR	1.3 km	MPC · JPL
673987	2015 HN_{138}	—	September 7, 2007	La Cañada	Lacruz, J.	·	2.1 km	MPC · JPL
673988	2015 HZ_{139}	—	November 7, 2012	Mount Lemmon	Mount Lemmon Survey	EOS	1.5 km	MPC · JPL
673989	2015 HV_{143}	—	November 5, 2005	Mount Lemmon	Mount Lemmon Survey	·	1.4 km	MPC · JPL
673990	2015 HA_{146}	—	April 18, 2015	Haleakala	Pan-STARRS 1	·	1.6 km	MPC · JPL
673991	2015 HL_{146}	—	April 1, 2015	Haleakala	Pan-STARRS 1	·	2.1 km	MPC · JPL
673992	2015 HQ_{152}	—	December 17, 1999	Kitt Peak	Spacewatch	·	970 m	MPC · JPL
673993	2015 HH_{154}	—	March 12, 2010	Kitt Peak	Spacewatch	·	1.5 km	MPC · JPL
673994	2015 HQ_{155}	—	April 18, 2015	Haleakala	Pan-STARRS 1	TIN	990 m	MPC · JPL
673995	2015 HK_{156}	—	April 24, 2015	Haleakala	Pan-STARRS 1	·	1.6 km	MPC · JPL
673996	2015 HD_{157}	—	October 9, 2013	Mount Lemmon	Mount Lemmon Survey	·	1.2 km	MPC · JPL
673997	2015 HM_{159}	—	September 18, 2003	Palomar	NEAT	·	1.8 km	MPC · JPL
673998	2015 HJ_{163}	—	April 24, 2015	Haleakala	Pan-STARRS 1	KOR	1.0 km	MPC · JPL
673999	2015 HO_{166}	—	July 28, 2005	Palomar	NEAT	·	1.8 km	MPC · JPL
674000	2015 HR_{169}	—	April 14, 2015	Catalina	CSS	H	560 m	MPC · JPL

back to top

== Meaning of names ==
As minor planet discoveries are confirmed, they are given a permanent number by the IAU's Minor Planet Center (MPC), and the discoverers can then submit names for them, following the IAU's naming conventions. The list below concerns those minor planets in the specified number-range that have received names, and explains the meanings of those names.

Official naming citations of newly named small Solar System bodies are approved and published in a bulletin by IAU's Working Group for Small Bodies Nomenclature (WGSBN). Before May 2021, citations were published in MPC's Minor Planet Circulars for many decades. Recent citations can also be found on the JPL Small-Body Database (SBDB). Until his death in 2016, German astronomer Lutz D. Schmadel compiled these citations into the Dictionary of Minor Planet Names (DMP) and regularly updated the collection.

Based on Paul Herget's The Names of the Minor Planets, Schmadel also researched the unclear origin of numerous asteroids, most of which had been named prior to World War II. This article incorporates text from this source, which is in the public domain: SBDB New namings may only be added to this list below after official publication as the preannouncement of names is condemned. The WGSBN publishes a comprehensive guideline for the naming rules of non-cometary small Solar System bodies.

Named minor planet	Provisional	This minor planet was named for...	Ref · Catalog
673014 Kósakissattila	2015 AM_{49}	Attila Kósa-Kiss, a Hungarian astronomist.	IAU · 673014
673736 Sanhueza	2015 FV_{178}	Pedro Sanhueza, Chilean guardian of dark skies, efficient lighting and the natural environment.	IAU · 673736
673741 Nikolayperov	2015 FW_{189}	Nikolay Perov, a Russian astronomer and researcher of the Cultural and educational Center n.a. V. V. Tereshkova.	IAU · 673741
