= List of minor planets: 653001–654000 =

The following is a partial list of minor planets, running from minor-planet number 653001 through 654000, inclusive. The primary data for this and other partial lists is based on JPL's "Small-Body Orbital Elements" and data available from the Minor Planet Center. Critical list information is also provided by the MPC, unless otherwise specified from Lowell Observatory. A detailed description of the table's columns and additional sources are given on the main page including a complete list of every page in this series, and a statistical break-up on the dynamical classification of minor planets.

Also see the summary list of all named bodies in numerical and alphabetical order, and the corresponding naming citations for the number range of this particular list. New namings may only be added to this list after official publication, as the preannouncement of names is condemned by the Working Group for Small Bodies Nomenclature of the International Astronomical Union.

Near-Earth obj.	MBA (inner)	MBA (outer)	Centaur
Mars-crosser	MBA (middle)	Jupiter trojan	Trans-Neptunian obj.
Unclassified

== 653001–653100 ==
Designation			Discovery			Properties		Ref
Permanent	Provisional	Named after	Date	Site	Discoverer(s)	Category	Diam.	Ref
653001	2014 HP_{110}	—	March 4, 2005	Vail-Jarnac	Jarnac	·	1.7 km	MPC · JPL
653002	2014 HZ_{111}	—	September 24, 2011	Haleakala	Pan-STARRS 1	·	770 m	MPC · JPL
653003	2014 HP_{112}	—	April 23, 2014	Cerro Tololo-DECam	DECam	·	2.5 km	MPC · JPL
653004	2014 HV_{119}	—	April 23, 2014	Cerro Tololo-DECam	DECam	·	2.6 km	MPC · JPL
653005	2014 HJ_{120}	—	September 23, 2008	Mount Lemmon	Mount Lemmon Survey	·	940 m	MPC · JPL
653006	2014 HS_{120}	—	April 23, 2014	Cerro Tololo-DECam	DECam	·	2.2 km	MPC · JPL
653007	2014 HD_{121}	—	September 23, 2005	Kitt Peak	Spacewatch	EOS	2.2 km	MPC · JPL
653008	2014 HU_{123}	—	April 24, 2014	Haleakala	Pan-STARRS 1	H	360 m	MPC · JPL
653009	2014 HL_{124}	—	April 26, 2014	Mount Lemmon	Mount Lemmon Survey	H	570 m	MPC · JPL
653010	2014 HX_{125}	—	September 24, 2011	Mount Lemmon	Mount Lemmon Survey	AGN	850 m	MPC · JPL
653011	2014 HY_{126}	—	December 23, 2012	Haleakala	Pan-STARRS 1	·	1.6 km	MPC · JPL
653012	2014 HN_{129}	—	April 28, 2014	Mount Lemmon	Mount Lemmon Survey	H	420 m	MPC · JPL
653013	2014 HH_{132}	—	April 28, 2014	Mount Lemmon	Mount Lemmon Survey	·	1.8 km	MPC · JPL
653014	2014 HW_{133}	—	October 1, 2005	Mount Lemmon	Mount Lemmon Survey	·	2.2 km	MPC · JPL
653015	2014 HY_{133}	—	April 23, 2014	Cerro Tololo-DECam	DECam	·	2.2 km	MPC · JPL
653016	2014 HZ_{134}	—	April 5, 2014	Haleakala	Pan-STARRS 1	·	810 m	MPC · JPL
653017	2014 HS_{136}	—	March 5, 2000	Cerro Tololo	Deep Lens Survey	·	640 m	MPC · JPL
653018	2014 HM_{137}	—	December 12, 2012	Kitt Peak	Spacewatch	·	1.7 km	MPC · JPL
653019	2014 HW_{137}	—	September 10, 2007	Mount Lemmon	Mount Lemmon Survey	·	960 m	MPC · JPL
653020	2014 HS_{138}	—	September 23, 2011	Haleakala	Pan-STARRS 1	·	1.2 km	MPC · JPL
653021	2014 HQ_{139}	—	April 5, 2014	Haleakala	Pan-STARRS 1	·	1.8 km	MPC · JPL
653022	2014 HH_{144}	—	March 26, 2009	Mount Lemmon	Mount Lemmon Survey	·	2.2 km	MPC · JPL
653023	2014 HL_{144}	—	October 2, 2006	Mount Lemmon	Mount Lemmon Survey	EOS	1.7 km	MPC · JPL
653024	2014 HV_{144}	—	April 28, 2003	Kitt Peak	Spacewatch	·	1.0 km	MPC · JPL
653025	2014 HM_{145}	—	March 24, 2014	Haleakala	Pan-STARRS 1	TIR	2.4 km	MPC · JPL
653026	2014 HZ_{145}	—	October 9, 2007	Mount Lemmon	Mount Lemmon Survey	(17392)	1.6 km	MPC · JPL
653027	2014 HO_{146}	—	February 21, 2007	Mount Lemmon	Mount Lemmon Survey	·	610 m	MPC · JPL
653028	2014 HW_{147}	—	July 5, 2005	Palomar	NEAT	EOS	2.0 km	MPC · JPL
653029	2014 HG_{148}	—	March 10, 2014	Kitt Peak	Spacewatch	·	970 m	MPC · JPL
653030	2014 HL_{149}	—	April 23, 2014	Cerro Tololo-DECam	DECam	·	2.5 km	MPC · JPL
653031	2014 HA_{151}	—	February 14, 2008	Catalina	CSS	·	2.2 km	MPC · JPL
653032	2014 HU_{151}	—	April 20, 2007	Mount Lemmon	Mount Lemmon Survey	·	740 m	MPC · JPL
653033	2014 HQ_{152}	—	October 12, 2007	Mount Lemmon	Mount Lemmon Survey	·	1.6 km	MPC · JPL
653034	2014 HF_{154}	—	April 6, 2003	Cerro Tololo	Deep Lens Survey	EOS	1.5 km	MPC · JPL
653035	2014 HL_{154}	—	March 11, 2008	Mount Lemmon	Mount Lemmon Survey	·	2.5 km	MPC · JPL
653036	2014 HO_{155}	—	December 17, 2003	Kitt Peak	Spacewatch	·	1.7 km	MPC · JPL
653037	2014 HS_{157}	—	April 24, 2014	Mount Lemmon	Mount Lemmon Survey	VER	2.2 km	MPC · JPL
653038	2014 HJ_{158}	—	September 1, 2005	Kitt Peak	Spacewatch	·	2.9 km	MPC · JPL
653039	2014 HY_{159}	—	September 24, 2011	Haleakala	Pan-STARRS 1	EOS	1.6 km	MPC · JPL
653040	2014 HV_{160}	—	March 28, 2014	Mount Lemmon	Mount Lemmon Survey	·	2.7 km	MPC · JPL
653041	2014 HW_{163}	—	October 30, 2002	Palomar	NEAT	·	2.0 km	MPC · JPL
653042	2014 HD_{165}	—	April 1, 2003	Apache Point	SDSS Collaboration	EOS	2.0 km	MPC · JPL
653043	2014 HG_{169}	—	November 1, 2002	La Palma	A. Fitzsimmons	·	1.7 km	MPC · JPL
653044	2014 HS_{169}	—	April 7, 2014	Mount Lemmon	Mount Lemmon Survey	·	2.5 km	MPC · JPL
653045	2014 HU_{170}	—	October 25, 2011	Haleakala	Pan-STARRS 1	·	1.9 km	MPC · JPL
653046	2014 HY_{170}	—	April 9, 2010	Mount Lemmon	Mount Lemmon Survey	·	1.0 km	MPC · JPL
653047	2014 HG_{175}	—	October 11, 2012	Haleakala	Pan-STARRS 1	·	680 m	MPC · JPL
653048	2014 HG_{179}	—	April 28, 2014	Kitt Peak	Spacewatch	EOS	1.6 km	MPC · JPL
653049	2014 HS_{180}	—	August 20, 2004	Kitt Peak	Spacewatch	·	690 m	MPC · JPL
653050	2014 HZ_{180}	—	April 11, 2003	Kitt Peak	Spacewatch	·	2.0 km	MPC · JPL
653051	2014 HO_{187}	—	October 10, 2012	Catalina	CSS	H	540 m	MPC · JPL
653052	2014 HG_{188}	—	February 28, 2014	Haleakala	Pan-STARRS 1	·	2.3 km	MPC · JPL
653053	2014 HS_{188}	—	March 3, 2005	Catalina	CSS	·	1.8 km	MPC · JPL
653054	2014 HM_{190}	—	April 5, 2008	Mount Lemmon	Mount Lemmon Survey	·	2.5 km	MPC · JPL
653055	2014 HG_{191}	—	March 19, 2007	Mount Lemmon	Mount Lemmon Survey	·	610 m	MPC · JPL
653056	2014 HM_{200}	—	April 29, 2014	ESA OGS	ESA OGS	H	430 m	MPC · JPL
653057	2014 HM_{202}	—	April 23, 2014	Mount Lemmon	Mount Lemmon Survey	·	2.0 km	MPC · JPL
653058	2014 HO_{202}	—	May 1, 2014	Mount Lemmon	Mount Lemmon Survey	·	2.7 km	MPC · JPL
653059	2014 HB_{205}	—	April 24, 2014	Haleakala	Pan-STARRS 1	VER	2.2 km	MPC · JPL
653060	2014 HJ_{211}	—	February 26, 2014	Haleakala	Pan-STARRS 1	L4	7.8 km	MPC · JPL
653061	2014 HL_{212}	—	April 25, 2014	Mount Lemmon	Mount Lemmon Survey	MAS	570 m	MPC · JPL
653062	2014 HX_{220}	—	April 23, 2014	Haleakala	Pan-STARRS 1	H	330 m	MPC · JPL
653063	2014 HZ_{223}	—	April 29, 2014	Haleakala	Pan-STARRS 1	·	2.5 km	MPC · JPL
653064	2014 HD_{224}	—	April 30, 2014	Haleakala	Pan-STARRS 1	·	2.3 km	MPC · JPL
653065	2014 HW_{225}	—	April 29, 2014	Haleakala	Pan-STARRS 1	·	880 m	MPC · JPL
653066	2014 HD_{226}	—	April 29, 2014	Haleakala	Pan-STARRS 1	H	390 m	MPC · JPL
653067	2014 HG_{227}	—	March 15, 2007	Kitt Peak	Spacewatch	·	550 m	MPC · JPL
653068	2014 HF_{229}	—	April 20, 2014	Mount Lemmon	Mount Lemmon Survey	V	470 m	MPC · JPL
653069	2014 HX_{229}	—	April 30, 2014	Haleakala	Pan-STARRS 1	(5)	910 m	MPC · JPL
653070	2014 HE_{232}	—	April 30, 2014	Haleakala	Pan-STARRS 1	·	2.6 km	MPC · JPL
653071	2014 HN_{232}	—	October 25, 2011	Haleakala	Pan-STARRS 1	·	2.2 km	MPC · JPL
653072	2014 HR_{233}	—	April 30, 2014	Haleakala	Pan-STARRS 1	URS	2.0 km	MPC · JPL
653073	2014 HV_{233}	—	April 30, 2014	Haleakala	Pan-STARRS 1	·	2.5 km	MPC · JPL
653074	2014 HH_{234}	—	April 30, 2014	Haleakala	Pan-STARRS 1	·	2.2 km	MPC · JPL
653075	2014 HC_{242}	—	August 7, 2016	Haleakala	Pan-STARRS 1	·	2.2 km	MPC · JPL
653076	2014 HH_{301}	—	October 4, 2011	Piszkés-tető	K. Sárneczky, S. Kürti	·	2.2 km	MPC · JPL
653077	2014 HW_{303}	—	September 18, 2010	Mount Lemmon	Mount Lemmon Survey	·	2.9 km	MPC · JPL
653078	2014 HP_{304}	—	April 28, 2014	Haleakala	Pan-STARRS 1	·	2.3 km	MPC · JPL
653079	2014 HH_{306}	—	April 23, 2014	Cerro Tololo-DECam	DECam	·	1.5 km	MPC · JPL
653080	2014 HK_{308}	—	October 24, 2011	Haleakala	Pan-STARRS 1	EOS	1.5 km	MPC · JPL
653081	2014 JB	—	March 7, 2003	St. Véran	St. Veran	H	550 m	MPC · JPL
653082	2014 JE_{4}	—	April 5, 2014	Haleakala	Pan-STARRS 1	·	3.0 km	MPC · JPL
653083	2014 JJ_{13}	—	March 14, 2010	Mount Lemmon	Mount Lemmon Survey	·	780 m	MPC · JPL
653084	2014 JN_{13}	—	May 3, 2014	Mount Lemmon	Mount Lemmon Survey	·	930 m	MPC · JPL
653085	2014 JM_{15}	—	May 5, 2014	Catalina	CSS	H	550 m	MPC · JPL
653086	2014 JO_{15}	—	May 3, 2014	Mount Lemmon	Mount Lemmon Survey	H	490 m	MPC · JPL
653087	2014 JP_{15}	—	October 18, 2007	Mount Lemmon	Mount Lemmon Survey	H	490 m	MPC · JPL
653088	2014 JP_{17}	—	November 19, 2003	Kitt Peak	Spacewatch	·	1.8 km	MPC · JPL
653089	2014 JF_{19}	—	April 24, 2014	Mount Lemmon	Mount Lemmon Survey	·	2.0 km	MPC · JPL
653090	2014 JN_{19}	—	April 4, 2014	Haleakala	Pan-STARRS 1	·	630 m	MPC · JPL
653091	2014 JF_{22}	—	May 4, 2014	Haleakala	Pan-STARRS 1	·	3.1 km	MPC · JPL
653092	2014 JE_{25}	—	April 8, 2014	Haleakala	Pan-STARRS 1	H	420 m	MPC · JPL
653093	2014 JX_{28}	—	January 10, 2013	Haleakala	Pan-STARRS 1	·	2.3 km	MPC · JPL
653094	2014 JL_{31}	—	August 26, 2011	Kitt Peak	Spacewatch	·	1.1 km	MPC · JPL
653095	2014 JD_{32}	—	February 28, 2014	Haleakala	Pan-STARRS 1	TIR	2.4 km	MPC · JPL
653096	2014 JN_{33}	—	January 14, 2002	Palomar	NEAT	LIX	2.7 km	MPC · JPL
653097	2014 JD_{34}	—	March 23, 2003	Apache Point	SDSS Collaboration	·	890 m	MPC · JPL
653098	2014 JD_{35}	—	May 1, 2009	Mount Lemmon	Mount Lemmon Survey	·	2.1 km	MPC · JPL
653099	2014 JN_{37}	—	March 31, 2008	Kitt Peak	Spacewatch	VER	2.7 km	MPC · JPL
653100	2014 JU_{37}	—	September 2, 2010	Mount Lemmon	Mount Lemmon Survey	·	2.5 km	MPC · JPL

== 653101–653200 ==
back to top

Designation			Discovery			Properties		Ref
Permanent	Provisional	Named after	Date	Site	Discoverer(s)	Category	Diam.	Ref
653101	2014 JK_{38}	—	May 30, 2006	Mount Lemmon	Mount Lemmon Survey	·	790 m	MPC · JPL
653102	2014 JZ_{41}	—	December 1, 2006	Mount Lemmon	Mount Lemmon Survey	·	3.3 km	MPC · JPL
653103	2014 JL_{44}	—	April 23, 2014	Cerro Tololo-DECam	DECam	·	2.2 km	MPC · JPL
653104	2014 JO_{45}	—	March 23, 2014	Kitt Peak	Spacewatch	LIX	3.2 km	MPC · JPL
653105	2014 JW_{46}	—	February 3, 2013	Haleakala	Pan-STARRS 1	·	2.2 km	MPC · JPL
653106	2014 JZ_{47}	—	November 18, 2011	Mount Lemmon	Mount Lemmon Survey	KON	1.9 km	MPC · JPL
653107	2014 JK_{49}	—	February 28, 2009	Mount Lemmon	Mount Lemmon Survey	·	1.6 km	MPC · JPL
653108	2014 JX_{50}	—	March 18, 2010	Mount Lemmon	Mount Lemmon Survey	NYS	1 km	MPC · JPL
653109	2014 JW_{52}	—	April 21, 2014	Kitt Peak	Spacewatch	·	670 m	MPC · JPL
653110	2014 JZ_{52}	—	September 5, 2000	Apache Point	SDSS	·	2.5 km	MPC · JPL
653111	2014 JE_{53}	—	April 30, 2014	Haleakala	Pan-STARRS 1	NYS	850 m	MPC · JPL
653112	2014 JH_{55}	—	April 30, 2014	Haleakala	Pan-STARRS 1	H	420 m	MPC · JPL
653113	2014 JY_{55}	—	April 30, 2014	Haleakala	Pan-STARRS 1	H	430 m	MPC · JPL
653114	2014 JB_{56}	—	May 8, 2014	Haleakala	Pan-STARRS 1	H	420 m	MPC · JPL
653115	2014 JU_{56}	—	May 9, 2014	Haleakala	Pan-STARRS 1	H	390 m	MPC · JPL
653116	2014 JR_{57}	—	September 28, 2005	Palomar	NEAT	·	1.0 km	MPC · JPL
653117	2014 JT_{57}	—	May 3, 2014	Mount Lemmon	Mount Lemmon Survey	·	910 m	MPC · JPL
653118	2014 JB_{58}	—	May 4, 2014	Haleakala	Pan-STARRS 1	·	2.1 km	MPC · JPL
653119	2014 JU_{58}	—	April 25, 2006	Kitt Peak	Spacewatch	H	410 m	MPC · JPL
653120	2014 JF_{66}	—	May 1, 2014	Mount Lemmon	Mount Lemmon Survey	·	1.4 km	MPC · JPL
653121	2014 JW_{68}	—	April 11, 2007	Kitt Peak	Spacewatch	·	4.3 km	MPC · JPL
653122	2014 JO_{71}	—	April 30, 2014	Haleakala	Pan-STARRS 1	·	630 m	MPC · JPL
653123	2014 JT_{72}	—	November 4, 2005	Mount Lemmon	Mount Lemmon Survey	·	820 m	MPC · JPL
653124	2014 JD_{74}	—	September 21, 2003	Kitt Peak	Spacewatch	·	980 m	MPC · JPL
653125	2014 JH_{77}	—	February 11, 2004	Palomar	NEAT	·	2.0 km	MPC · JPL
653126	2014 JZ_{80}	—	October 20, 2012	Haleakala	Pan-STARRS 1	H	380 m	MPC · JPL
653127	2014 JE_{84}	—	May 3, 2014	Mount Lemmon	Mount Lemmon Survey	·	2.6 km	MPC · JPL
653128	2014 JY_{85}	—	October 3, 2011	Mount Lemmon	Mount Lemmon Survey	·	2.9 km	MPC · JPL
653129	2014 JB_{87}	—	March 11, 2003	Kitt Peak	Spacewatch	·	730 m	MPC · JPL
653130	2014 JJ_{89}	—	May 6, 2014	Haleakala	Pan-STARRS 1	·	920 m	MPC · JPL
653131	2014 JR_{90}	—	May 8, 2014	Haleakala	Pan-STARRS 1	·	2.1 km	MPC · JPL
653132	2014 JF_{92}	—	May 4, 2014	Haleakala	Pan-STARRS 1	·	920 m	MPC · JPL
653133	2014 JQ_{93}	—	May 10, 2014	Haleakala	Pan-STARRS 1	·	1.2 km	MPC · JPL
653134	2014 JR_{94}	—	May 7, 2014	Haleakala	Pan-STARRS 1	·	2.6 km	MPC · JPL
653135	2014 JU_{98}	—	May 4, 2014	Haleakala	Pan-STARRS 1	·	880 m	MPC · JPL
653136	2014 JF_{119}	—	May 1, 2014	Mount Lemmon	Mount Lemmon Survey	·	590 m	MPC · JPL
653137	2014 JH_{119}	—	May 8, 2014	Haleakala	Pan-STARRS 1	·	830 m	MPC · JPL
653138	2014 JB_{122}	—	May 5, 2014	Mount Lemmon	Mount Lemmon Survey	·	2.2 km	MPC · JPL
653139	2014 JQ_{123}	—	May 7, 2014	Haleakala	Pan-STARRS 1	·	2.7 km	MPC · JPL
653140	2014 JW_{139}	—	May 8, 2014	Haleakala	Pan-STARRS 1	·	1.0 km	MPC · JPL
653141	2014 KB_{4}	—	March 30, 2011	Haleakala	Pan-STARRS 1	H	460 m	MPC · JPL
653142	2014 KV_{4}	—	November 16, 2001	Kitt Peak	Spacewatch	·	2.4 km	MPC · JPL
653143	2014 KK_{7}	—	April 5, 2014	Haleakala	Pan-STARRS 1	·	850 m	MPC · JPL
653144	2014 KW_{7}	—	March 26, 2003	Kitt Peak	Spacewatch	·	2.5 km	MPC · JPL
653145	2014 KY_{7}	—	September 17, 2010	Mount Lemmon	Mount Lemmon Survey	·	2.9 km	MPC · JPL
653146	2014 KK_{9}	—	May 8, 2014	Haleakala	Pan-STARRS 1	VER	2.0 km	MPC · JPL
653147	2014 KT_{10}	—	November 5, 2002	La Palma	A. Fitzsimmons	·	1.8 km	MPC · JPL
653148	2014 KK_{14}	—	March 26, 2008	Mount Lemmon	Mount Lemmon Survey	·	2.2 km	MPC · JPL
653149	2014 KW_{16}	—	April 3, 2014	Haleakala	Pan-STARRS 1	(5)	1.2 km	MPC · JPL
653150	2014 KG_{18}	—	January 8, 2013	Mount Lemmon	Mount Lemmon Survey	·	2.3 km	MPC · JPL
653151	2014 KM_{18}	—	March 20, 2001	Haleakala	NEAT	·	1.3 km	MPC · JPL
653152	2014 KC_{22}	—	May 23, 2006	Mount Lemmon	Mount Lemmon Survey	H	420 m	MPC · JPL
653153	2014 KX_{23}	—	April 5, 2014	Haleakala	Pan-STARRS 1	·	2.6 km	MPC · JPL
653154	2014 KL_{25}	—	May 8, 2014	Haleakala	Pan-STARRS 1	·	2.3 km	MPC · JPL
653155	2014 KB_{26}	—	May 7, 2014	Haleakala	Pan-STARRS 1	·	2.4 km	MPC · JPL
653156	2014 KA_{27}	—	September 25, 2005	Kitt Peak	Spacewatch	·	3.2 km	MPC · JPL
653157	2014 KQ_{28}	—	April 4, 2010	Kitt Peak	Spacewatch	NYS	950 m	MPC · JPL
653158	2014 KV_{31}	—	May 4, 2014	Mount Lemmon	Mount Lemmon Survey	·	860 m	MPC · JPL
653159	2014 KV_{34}	—	April 29, 2014	Haleakala	Pan-STARRS 1	EOS	1.5 km	MPC · JPL
653160	2014 KZ_{34}	—	March 23, 2003	Apache Point	SDSS Collaboration	·	2.7 km	MPC · JPL
653161	2014 KE_{37}	—	March 15, 2002	Palomar	NEAT	·	2.9 km	MPC · JPL
653162	2014 KY_{37}	—	May 5, 2014	Haleakala	Pan-STARRS 1	TIR	2.5 km	MPC · JPL
653163	2014 KZ_{37}	—	December 15, 2006	Kitt Peak	Spacewatch	URS	2.5 km	MPC · JPL
653164	2014 KV_{38}	—	May 24, 2014	Haleakala	Pan-STARRS 1	H	540 m	MPC · JPL
653165	2014 KU_{39}	—	May 26, 2014	Mount Lemmon	Mount Lemmon Survey	H	450 m	MPC · JPL
653166	2014 KD_{40}	—	October 17, 2012	Haleakala	Pan-STARRS 1	H	450 m	MPC · JPL
653167	2014 KO_{40}	—	October 11, 2006	Palomar	NEAT	H	570 m	MPC · JPL
653168	2014 KG_{42}	—	March 12, 2007	Mount Lemmon	Mount Lemmon Survey	·	690 m	MPC · JPL
653169	2014 KY_{45}	—	April 30, 2006	Catalina	CSS	H	660 m	MPC · JPL
653170	2014 KK_{46}	—	September 10, 2007	Kitt Peak	Spacewatch	·	1.0 km	MPC · JPL
653171	2014 KE_{47}	—	September 29, 2005	Mount Lemmon	Mount Lemmon Survey	·	2.6 km	MPC · JPL
653172	2014 KY_{47}	—	November 1, 2010	Mount Lemmon	Mount Lemmon Survey	·	2.7 km	MPC · JPL
653173	2014 KF_{52}	—	May 4, 2014	Mount Lemmon	Mount Lemmon Survey	·	820 m	MPC · JPL
653174	2014 KD_{55}	—	November 12, 2006	Mount Lemmon	Mount Lemmon Survey	·	2.5 km	MPC · JPL
653175	2014 KV_{56}	—	December 19, 2003	Kitt Peak	Spacewatch	·	2.3 km	MPC · JPL
653176	2014 KY_{60}	—	September 16, 2006	Catalina	CSS	·	1.9 km	MPC · JPL
653177	2014 KB_{62}	—	July 19, 2009	Plana	Fratev, F.	·	2.3 km	MPC · JPL
653178	2014 KP_{62}	—	May 26, 2014	Mount Lemmon	Mount Lemmon Survey	H	450 m	MPC · JPL
653179	2014 KW_{62}	—	May 21, 2014	Haleakala	Pan-STARRS 1	·	3.0 km	MPC · JPL
653180	2014 KF_{65}	—	January 17, 2007	Catalina	CSS	·	3.2 km	MPC · JPL
653181	2014 KM_{67}	—	March 13, 2013	Kitt Peak	M. W. Buie	·	1.1 km	MPC · JPL
653182	2014 KO_{69}	—	May 23, 2014	Haleakala	Pan-STARRS 1	V	450 m	MPC · JPL
653183	2014 KL_{71}	—	May 8, 2008	Kitt Peak	Spacewatch	·	2.4 km	MPC · JPL
653184	2014 KD_{76}	—	May 8, 2014	Haleakala	Pan-STARRS 1	H	500 m	MPC · JPL
653185	2014 KH_{78}	—	October 7, 2004	Kitt Peak	Spacewatch	T_{j} (2.99) · EUP	3.6 km	MPC · JPL
653186	2014 KB_{83}	—	May 28, 2014	Haleakala	Pan-STARRS 1	·	720 m	MPC · JPL
653187	2014 KE_{84}	—	October 26, 2012	Haleakala	Pan-STARRS 1	H	440 m	MPC · JPL
653188	2014 KH_{85}	—	January 22, 2013	Mount Lemmon	Mount Lemmon Survey	L4	10 km	MPC · JPL
653189	2014 KY_{92}	—	April 13, 2010	Mount Lemmon	Mount Lemmon Survey	MAS	620 m	MPC · JPL
653190	2014 KV_{94}	—	February 23, 2007	Mount Lemmon	Mount Lemmon Survey	·	2.6 km	MPC · JPL
653191	2014 KW_{95}	—	January 12, 2010	Kitt Peak	Spacewatch	·	730 m	MPC · JPL
653192	2014 KY_{96}	—	May 23, 2014	Kitt Peak	Spacewatch	·	3.0 km	MPC · JPL
653193	2014 KR_{98}	—	May 21, 2014	Haleakala	Pan-STARRS 1	NYS	810 m	MPC · JPL
653194	2014 KU_{99}	—	May 7, 2014	Haleakala	Pan-STARRS 1	H	380 m	MPC · JPL
653195	2014 KL_{110}	—	May 23, 2014	Haleakala	Pan-STARRS 1	EOS	1.7 km	MPC · JPL
653196	2014 KZ_{112}	—	May 31, 2014	Haleakala	Pan-STARRS 1	·	1.6 km	MPC · JPL
653197	2014 KG_{115}	—	May 28, 2014	Haleakala	Pan-STARRS 1	·	770 m	MPC · JPL
653198	2014 KZ_{115}	—	May 23, 2014	Haleakala	Pan-STARRS 1	H	440 m	MPC · JPL
653199	2014 KM_{117}	—	May 21, 2014	Haleakala	Pan-STARRS 1	·	2.0 km	MPC · JPL
653200	2014 KM_{124}	—	May 8, 2014	Haleakala	Pan-STARRS 1	·	2.2 km	MPC · JPL

== 653201–653300 ==
back to top

Designation			Discovery			Properties		Ref
Permanent	Provisional	Named after	Date	Site	Discoverer(s)	Category	Diam.	Ref
653201	2014 KR_{125}	—	May 20, 2014	Haleakala	Pan-STARRS 1	·	2.5 km	MPC · JPL
653202	2014 KR_{128}	—	May 24, 2014	Haleakala	Pan-STARRS 1	V	470 m	MPC · JPL
653203	2014 KD_{132}	—	May 27, 2014	Mount Lemmon	Mount Lemmon Survey	(5)	1.1 km	MPC · JPL
653204	2014 KS_{136}	—	May 27, 2014	Mount Lemmon	Mount Lemmon Survey	NYS	1.1 km	MPC · JPL
653205	2014 KN_{138}	—	May 23, 2014	Haleakala	Pan-STARRS 1	·	2.7 km	MPC · JPL
653206	2014 KO_{138}	—	May 21, 2014	Haleakala	Pan-STARRS 1	MAS	470 m	MPC · JPL
653207	2014 KS_{139}	—	May 23, 2014	Haleakala	Pan-STARRS 1	·	2.7 km	MPC · JPL
653208	2014 KN_{140}	—	May 23, 2014	Haleakala	Pan-STARRS 1	·	2.5 km	MPC · JPL
653209	2014 KO_{140}	—	May 30, 2014	Haleakala	Pan-STARRS 1	·	2.7 km	MPC · JPL
653210	2014 KE_{143}	—	May 7, 2014	Haleakala	Pan-STARRS 1	·	2.9 km	MPC · JPL
653211	2014 KZ_{145}	—	May 23, 2014	Haleakala	Pan-STARRS 1	·	2.2 km	MPC · JPL
653212	2014 LO	—	April 8, 2002	Palomar	NEAT	·	3.0 km	MPC · JPL
653213	2014 LC_{1}	—	April 25, 2014	Mount Lemmon	Mount Lemmon Survey	·	2.5 km	MPC · JPL
653214	2014 LD_{6}	—	November 24, 2011	Mount Lemmon	Mount Lemmon Survey	·	3.3 km	MPC · JPL
653215	2014 LD_{12}	—	April 8, 2002	Palomar	NEAT	·	1.1 km	MPC · JPL
653216	2014 LH_{16}	—	October 2, 2006	Kitt Peak	Spacewatch	·	960 m	MPC · JPL
653217	2014 LX_{19}	—	October 30, 2010	Piszkés-tető	K. Sárneczky, Z. Kuli	·	2.4 km	MPC · JPL
653218	2014 LP_{20}	—	June 5, 2014	Haleakala	Pan-STARRS 1	·	960 m	MPC · JPL
653219	2014 LL_{21}	—	June 7, 2014	Mount Lemmon	Mount Lemmon Survey	·	3.2 km	MPC · JPL
653220	2014 LQ_{21}	—	January 24, 2011	Mount Lemmon	Mount Lemmon Survey	H	500 m	MPC · JPL
653221	2014 LV_{23}	—	May 31, 2009	Cerro Burek	Burek, Cerro	·	2.7 km	MPC · JPL
653222	2014 LW_{24}	—	January 2, 2011	Flagstaff	Wasserman, L. H.	H	490 m	MPC · JPL
653223	2014 LE_{26}	—	November 18, 2007	Kitt Peak	Spacewatch	H	490 m	MPC · JPL
653224	2014 LZ_{27}	—	August 18, 2010	XuYi	PMO NEO Survey Program	·	1.6 km	MPC · JPL
653225	2014 LB_{28}	—	May 26, 2014	Haleakala	Pan-STARRS 1	·	2.3 km	MPC · JPL
653226	2014 LB_{32}	—	September 16, 2010	Mount Lemmon	Mount Lemmon Survey	·	1.2 km	MPC · JPL
653227	2014 LK_{34}	—	July 15, 2005	Kitt Peak	Spacewatch	·	1.7 km	MPC · JPL
653228	2014 LS_{35}	—	February 12, 2008	Mount Lemmon	Mount Lemmon Survey	·	1.6 km	MPC · JPL
653229	2014 LW_{36}	—	June 8, 2014	Haleakala	Pan-STARRS 1	·	2.5 km	MPC · JPL
653230	2014 LH_{37}	—	June 3, 2014	Haleakala	Pan-STARRS 1	·	1.3 km	MPC · JPL
653231	2014 MZ	—	May 7, 2014	Haleakala	Pan-STARRS 1	H	400 m	MPC · JPL
653232	2014 MD_{1}	—	February 28, 2014	Haleakala	Pan-STARRS 1	·	2.7 km	MPC · JPL
653233	2014 MO_{7}	—	June 2, 2014	Haleakala	Pan-STARRS 1	·	1.8 km	MPC · JPL
653234	2014 MY_{9}	—	May 5, 2014	Mount Lemmon	Mount Lemmon Survey	·	2.8 km	MPC · JPL
653235	2014 ML_{12}	—	October 1, 2011	Kitt Peak	Spacewatch	V	570 m	MPC · JPL
653236	2014 MT_{13}	—	March 12, 2013	Nogales	M. Schwartz, P. R. Holvorcem	TIR	2.9 km	MPC · JPL
653237	2014 MK_{14}	—	May 26, 2014	Haleakala	Pan-STARRS 1	H	410 m	MPC · JPL
653238	2014 ML_{16}	—	May 28, 2014	Haleakala	Pan-STARRS 1	·	720 m	MPC · JPL
653239	2014 MP_{16}	—	June 23, 2014	Mount Lemmon	Mount Lemmon Survey	·	1.2 km	MPC · JPL
653240	2014 MA_{17}	—	September 19, 2006	Kitt Peak	Spacewatch	·	910 m	MPC · JPL
653241	2014 MS_{17}	—	December 10, 2002	Socorro	LINEAR	·	1.3 km	MPC · JPL
653242	2014 MS_{20}	—	October 5, 2010	La Sagra	OAM	·	1.4 km	MPC · JPL
653243	2014 ML_{23}	—	July 26, 2006	Siding Spring	SSS	·	1.1 km	MPC · JPL
653244	2014 MD_{24}	—	January 28, 2007	Mount Lemmon	Mount Lemmon Survey	THM	2.1 km	MPC · JPL
653245	2014 MB_{35}	—	October 28, 2011	Kitt Peak	Spacewatch	NYS	900 m	MPC · JPL
653246	2014 MU_{44}	—	September 15, 2004	Kitt Peak	Spacewatch	·	2.1 km	MPC · JPL
653247	2014 MP_{45}	—	June 1, 2006	Mount Lemmon	Mount Lemmon Survey	EUN	810 m	MPC · JPL
653248	2014 MH_{47}	—	August 2, 2011	Haleakala	Pan-STARRS 1	·	770 m	MPC · JPL
653249	2014 MD_{49}	—	September 5, 2000	Kitt Peak	Spacewatch	·	800 m	MPC · JPL
653250	2014 MK_{54}	—	April 12, 2005	Kitt Peak	Deep Ecliptic Survey	·	860 m	MPC · JPL
653251	2014 MR_{56}	—	June 27, 2014	Haleakala	Pan-STARRS 1	·	1.5 km	MPC · JPL
653252	2014 MC_{57}	—	June 27, 2014	Haleakala	Pan-STARRS 1	·	830 m	MPC · JPL
653253	2014 ME_{62}	—	June 28, 2014	Haleakala	Pan-STARRS 1	·	2.9 km	MPC · JPL
653254	2014 MP_{62}	—	April 10, 2005	Kitt Peak	Spacewatch	·	1.1 km	MPC · JPL
653255	2014 MF_{66}	—	September 11, 2004	Kitt Peak	Spacewatch	·	1.8 km	MPC · JPL
653256	2014 ME_{67}	—	April 30, 2014	Haleakala	Pan-STARRS 1	PHO	1.1 km	MPC · JPL
653257	2014 MY_{70}	—	June 24, 2014	Haleakala	Pan-STARRS 1	·	2.9 km	MPC · JPL
653258	2014 MD_{72}	—	June 24, 2014	Haleakala	Pan-STARRS 1	EUN	980 m	MPC · JPL
653259	2014 MF_{72}	—	October 16, 1977	Palomar	C. J. van Houten, I. van Houten-Groeneveld, T. Gehrels	·	2.4 km	MPC · JPL
653260	2014 MO_{72}	—	October 5, 2005	Catalina	CSS	·	1.9 km	MPC · JPL
653261	2014 MW_{72}	—	November 7, 2010	Mount Lemmon	Mount Lemmon Survey	·	2.6 km	MPC · JPL
653262	2014 MQ_{74}	—	June 20, 2010	Mount Lemmon	Mount Lemmon Survey	(5)	1.2 km	MPC · JPL
653263	2014 ML_{75}	—	June 25, 2014	Mount Lemmon	Mount Lemmon Survey	·	3.2 km	MPC · JPL
653264	2014 ME_{76}	—	June 27, 2014	Haleakala	Pan-STARRS 1	·	980 m	MPC · JPL
653265	2014 MV_{76}	—	June 28, 2014	Haleakala	Pan-STARRS 1	EUN	1.1 km	MPC · JPL
653266	2014 MT_{78}	—	June 21, 2014	Haleakala	Pan-STARRS 1	·	1.3 km	MPC · JPL
653267	2014 MH_{88}	—	June 29, 2014	Haleakala	Pan-STARRS 1	·	3.2 km	MPC · JPL
653268	2014 MH_{89}	—	June 24, 2014	Haleakala	Pan-STARRS 1	H	530 m	MPC · JPL
653269	2014 MA_{99}	—	June 27, 2014	Haleakala	Pan-STARRS 1	·	3.0 km	MPC · JPL
653270	2014 NL_{1}	—	October 29, 2005	Kitt Peak	Spacewatch	(1298)	2.6 km	MPC · JPL
653271	2014 NN_{3}	—	December 1, 2008	Kitt Peak	Spacewatch	·	1.5 km	MPC · JPL
653272	2014 NS_{5}	—	February 4, 2006	Kitt Peak	Spacewatch	NYS	780 m	MPC · JPL
653273	2014 NT_{6}	—	July 1, 2014	Haleakala	Pan-STARRS 1	·	3.2 km	MPC · JPL
653274	2014 NT_{9}	—	November 1, 2005	La Silla	Behrend, R., Barblan, F.	GEF	1.5 km	MPC · JPL
653275	2014 NK_{10}	—	September 11, 2010	Dauban	C. Rinner, Kugel, F.	MRX	860 m	MPC · JPL
653276	2014 NS_{11}	—	September 16, 2006	Catalina	CSS	·	1.4 km	MPC · JPL
653277	2014 NA_{14}	—	September 28, 2011	Kitt Peak	Spacewatch	NYS	1.2 km	MPC · JPL
653278	2014 NJ_{21}	—	March 7, 2013	Kitt Peak	Spacewatch	·	2.6 km	MPC · JPL
653279	2014 NF_{22}	—	June 22, 2014	Haleakala	Pan-STARRS 1	NYS	850 m	MPC · JPL
653280	2014 NP_{23}	—	November 26, 2005	Kitt Peak	Spacewatch	EOS	2.4 km	MPC · JPL
653281	2014 NH_{31}	—	June 2, 2014	Haleakala	Pan-STARRS 1	·	1.2 km	MPC · JPL
653282	2014 NW_{36}	—	February 25, 2012	Mayhill-ISON	L. Elenin	·	2.8 km	MPC · JPL
653283	2014 NM_{46}	—	July 5, 1995	Kitt Peak	Spacewatch	H	440 m	MPC · JPL
653284	2014 NT_{46}	—	April 1, 2007	Palomar	NEAT	PHO	980 m	MPC · JPL
653285	2014 NV_{46}	—	June 3, 2014	Haleakala	Pan-STARRS 1	EUN	1.1 km	MPC · JPL
653286	2014 NY_{46}	—	July 21, 2006	Catalina	CSS	H	550 m	MPC · JPL
653287	2014 NY_{52}	—	June 22, 2014	Haleakala	Pan-STARRS 1	·	1.1 km	MPC · JPL
653288	2014 NN_{53}	—	July 6, 2014	Haleakala	Pan-STARRS 1	RAF	750 m	MPC · JPL
653289	2014 NR_{53}	—	January 13, 2007	Mauna Kea	D. D. Balam, K. M. Perrett	·	2.7 km	MPC · JPL
653290	2014 NS_{53}	—	May 7, 2014	Haleakala	Pan-STARRS 1	PHO	690 m	MPC · JPL
653291	2014 NL_{59}	—	July 18, 2006	Mount Lemmon	Mount Lemmon Survey	H	450 m	MPC · JPL
653292	2014 NO_{59}	—	July 19, 2004	Anderson Mesa	LONEOS	·	2.6 km	MPC · JPL
653293	2014 ND_{65}	—	October 22, 2019	Mount Lemmon	Mount Lemmon Survey	PHO	1.1 km	MPC · JPL
653294	2014 NS_{68}	—	October 18, 2009	Mount Lemmon	Mount Lemmon Survey	THM	2.0 km	MPC · JPL
653295	2014 NL_{70}	—	July 3, 2014	Haleakala	Pan-STARRS 1	·	920 m	MPC · JPL
653296	2014 NH_{72}	—	March 31, 2009	Kitt Peak	Spacewatch	·	1.2 km	MPC · JPL
653297	2014 NG_{73}	—	July 7, 2014	Haleakala	Pan-STARRS 1	·	1.1 km	MPC · JPL
653298	2014 NJ_{73}	—	July 8, 2014	Haleakala	Pan-STARRS 1	·	2.8 km	MPC · JPL
653299	2014 NW_{87}	—	July 1, 2014	Haleakala	Pan-STARRS 1	·	870 m	MPC · JPL
653300	2014 NG_{89}	—	July 1, 2014	Mount Lemmon	Mount Lemmon Survey	PHO	760 m	MPC · JPL

== 653301–653400 ==
back to top

Designation			Discovery			Properties		Ref
Permanent	Provisional	Named after	Date	Site	Discoverer(s)	Category	Diam.	Ref
653301	2014 NR_{91}	—	July 7, 2014	Haleakala	Pan-STARRS 1	·	1.1 km	MPC · JPL
653302	2014 ON	—	January 18, 2012	Mount Lemmon	Mount Lemmon Survey	THM	2.1 km	MPC · JPL
653303	2014 OB_{2}	—	May 7, 2014	Haleakala	Pan-STARRS 1	·	2.4 km	MPC · JPL
653304	2014 OS_{3}	—	December 27, 2011	Mount Lemmon	Mount Lemmon Survey	·	1.1 km	MPC · JPL
653305	2014 OO_{4}	—	September 24, 2011	Mount Lemmon	Mount Lemmon Survey	·	1.0 km	MPC · JPL
653306	2014 OL_{11}	—	June 4, 2014	Haleakala	Pan-STARRS 1	NYS	820 m	MPC · JPL
653307	2014 OM_{21}	—	July 25, 2014	Haleakala	Pan-STARRS 1	·	920 m	MPC · JPL
653308	2014 OW_{27}	—	July 25, 2014	Haleakala	Pan-STARRS 1	·	2.0 km	MPC · JPL
653309	2014 OY_{28}	—	October 22, 2005	Kitt Peak	Spacewatch	KOR	1.1 km	MPC · JPL
653310	2014 OJ_{29}	—	October 21, 1995	Kitt Peak	Spacewatch	·	1.6 km	MPC · JPL
653311	2014 OX_{31}	—	August 25, 2004	Kitt Peak	Spacewatch	·	1.8 km	MPC · JPL
653312	2014 OW_{32}	—	January 11, 2008	Kitt Peak	Spacewatch	·	1.0 km	MPC · JPL
653313	2014 OA_{35}	—	September 6, 2010	Mount Lemmon	Mount Lemmon Survey	·	1.2 km	MPC · JPL
653314	2014 OD_{36}	—	October 11, 2005	Kitt Peak	Spacewatch	KOR	1.3 km	MPC · JPL
653315	2014 OR_{38}	—	July 3, 2014	Haleakala	Pan-STARRS 1	·	840 m	MPC · JPL
653316	2014 OT_{44}	—	March 8, 2003	Kitt Peak	Spacewatch	·	1.7 km	MPC · JPL
653317	2014 OG_{47}	—	January 18, 2013	Kitt Peak	Spacewatch	·	970 m	MPC · JPL
653318	2014 OF_{65}	—	January 5, 2013	Kitt Peak	Spacewatch	NYS	1.0 km	MPC · JPL
653319	2014 OL_{67}	—	July 25, 2014	Haleakala	Pan-STARRS 1	·	880 m	MPC · JPL
653320	2014 OD_{69}	—	April 16, 2013	Cerro Tololo-DECam	DECam	·	760 m	MPC · JPL
653321	2014 OY_{72}	—	October 17, 2010	Catalina	CSS	·	1.2 km	MPC · JPL
653322	2014 OV_{75}	—	April 4, 2013	Haleakala	Pan-STARRS 1	·	2.2 km	MPC · JPL
653323	2014 OD_{76}	—	July 1, 2014	Haleakala	Pan-STARRS 1	·	910 m	MPC · JPL
653324	2014 OZ_{77}	—	November 25, 2005	Kitt Peak	Spacewatch	·	3.0 km	MPC · JPL
653325	2014 OE_{79}	—	June 4, 2014	Haleakala	Pan-STARRS 1	·	1.1 km	MPC · JPL
653326	2014 OS_{81}	—	October 21, 2006	Mount Lemmon	Mount Lemmon Survey	·	1.0 km	MPC · JPL
653327	2014 OJ_{86}	—	May 31, 2014	Haleakala	Pan-STARRS 1	·	2.0 km	MPC · JPL
653328	2014 ON_{91}	—	July 26, 2014	Haleakala	Pan-STARRS 1	·	870 m	MPC · JPL
653329	2014 OA_{92}	—	July 26, 2014	Haleakala	Pan-STARRS 1	·	1.2 km	MPC · JPL
653330	2014 OQ_{92}	—	July 26, 2014	Haleakala	Pan-STARRS 1	·	1.3 km	MPC · JPL
653331	2014 OR_{97}	—	July 7, 2014	Haleakala	Pan-STARRS 1	·	1.0 km	MPC · JPL
653332	2014 OX_{97}	—	September 19, 2003	Haleakala	NEAT	·	3.7 km	MPC · JPL
653333	2014 OS_{99}	—	July 26, 2014	Haleakala	Pan-STARRS 1	·	2.5 km	MPC · JPL
653334	2014 OZ_{105}	—	October 8, 2007	Mount Lemmon	Mount Lemmon Survey	T_{j} (2.98) · 3:2 · SHU	3.5 km	MPC · JPL
653335	2014 OG_{109}	—	July 27, 2014	Haleakala	Pan-STARRS 1	·	920 m	MPC · JPL
653336	2014 OD_{111}	—	March 27, 2008	Mount Lemmon	Mount Lemmon Survey	KOR	1.2 km	MPC · JPL
653337	2014 OU_{117}	—	April 11, 2004	Palomar	NEAT	·	1.6 km	MPC · JPL
653338	2014 OR_{121}	—	September 8, 2010	Kitt Peak	Spacewatch	·	1.3 km	MPC · JPL
653339	2014 OG_{124}	—	August 25, 2000	Cerro Tololo	Deep Ecliptic Survey	KOR	1.2 km	MPC · JPL
653340	2014 OR_{126}	—	July 25, 2014	Haleakala	Pan-STARRS 1	3:2	3.8 km	MPC · JPL
653341	2014 OT_{127}	—	October 30, 2010	Mount Lemmon	Mount Lemmon Survey	·	1.8 km	MPC · JPL
653342	2014 OE_{131}	—	March 9, 2000	Kitt Peak	Spacewatch	·	2.2 km	MPC · JPL
653343	2014 OL_{133}	—	October 29, 2005	Mount Lemmon	Mount Lemmon Survey	·	1.5 km	MPC · JPL
653344	2014 OR_{135}	—	July 27, 2014	Haleakala	Pan-STARRS 1	·	990 m	MPC · JPL
653345	2014 OG_{138}	—	July 27, 2014	Haleakala	Pan-STARRS 1	AGN	1.0 km	MPC · JPL
653346	2014 OQ_{145}	—	November 19, 2003	Kitt Peak	Spacewatch	MAS	570 m	MPC · JPL
653347	2014 OT_{145}	—	September 25, 2006	Anderson Mesa	LONEOS	·	920 m	MPC · JPL
653348	2014 OP_{151}	—	July 27, 2014	Haleakala	Pan-STARRS 1	·	890 m	MPC · JPL
653349	2014 OJ_{154}	—	November 15, 2006	Mount Lemmon	Mount Lemmon Survey	PAD	1.6 km	MPC · JPL
653350	2014 OY_{155}	—	July 27, 2014	Haleakala	Pan-STARRS 1	·	970 m	MPC · JPL
653351	2014 OT_{159}	—	December 30, 2007	Kitt Peak	Spacewatch	·	1.1 km	MPC · JPL
653352	2014 OJ_{161}	—	September 12, 2002	Palomar	NEAT	·	920 m	MPC · JPL
653353	2014 OH_{168}	—	June 29, 2014	Haleakala	Pan-STARRS 1	·	870 m	MPC · JPL
653354	2014 OU_{169}	—	April 10, 2010	Kitt Peak	Spacewatch	·	840 m	MPC · JPL
653355	2014 OY_{170}	—	February 2, 2009	Kitt Peak	Spacewatch	·	1.0 km	MPC · JPL
653356	2014 OT_{176}	—	September 19, 2003	Kitt Peak	Spacewatch	PHO	800 m	MPC · JPL
653357	2014 ON_{181}	—	April 15, 2013	Haleakala	Pan-STARRS 1	VER	3.5 km	MPC · JPL
653358	2014 OF_{186}	—	July 27, 2014	Haleakala	Pan-STARRS 1	·	1.1 km	MPC · JPL
653359	2014 OR_{187}	—	July 27, 2014	Haleakala	Pan-STARRS 1	·	1.5 km	MPC · JPL
653360	2014 OJ_{190}	—	July 27, 2014	Haleakala	Pan-STARRS 1	·	1.2 km	MPC · JPL
653361	2014 OB_{191}	—	November 21, 2003	Palomar	NEAT	·	4.5 km	MPC · JPL
653362	2014 OS_{195}	—	November 12, 2010	Mount Lemmon	Mount Lemmon Survey	·	1.1 km	MPC · JPL
653363	2014 OY_{205}	—	July 25, 2014	Haleakala	Pan-STARRS 1	·	1.2 km	MPC · JPL
653364	2014 OM_{211}	—	July 25, 2014	Haleakala	Pan-STARRS 1	T_{j} (2.95)	3.9 km	MPC · JPL
653365	2014 OX_{212}	—	September 11, 2010	Kitt Peak	Spacewatch	AST	1.4 km	MPC · JPL
653366	2014 OA_{222}	—	January 16, 2013	ESA OGS	ESA OGS	H	370 m	MPC · JPL
653367	2014 OV_{227}	—	July 8, 2014	Haleakala	Pan-STARRS 1	·	1.3 km	MPC · JPL
653368	2014 OK_{229}	—	July 27, 2014	Haleakala	Pan-STARRS 1	·	1.5 km	MPC · JPL
653369	2014 OH_{230}	—	July 27, 2014	Haleakala	Pan-STARRS 1	·	1.2 km	MPC · JPL
653370	2014 OL_{231}	—	August 28, 2005	Kitt Peak	Spacewatch	EUN	1.1 km	MPC · JPL
653371	2014 OW_{232}	—	July 31, 2005	Siding Spring	SSS	·	1.4 km	MPC · JPL
653372	2014 OY_{232}	—	November 13, 2010	Mount Lemmon	Mount Lemmon Survey	·	1.2 km	MPC · JPL
653373	2014 OH_{241}	—	May 28, 2014	ESA OGS	ESA OGS	H	360 m	MPC · JPL
653374	2014 OK_{242}	—	November 3, 2010	Mount Lemmon	Mount Lemmon Survey	KOR	1.2 km	MPC · JPL
653375	2014 OE_{247}	—	September 28, 2006	Kitt Peak	Spacewatch	·	1.1 km	MPC · JPL
653376	2014 OD_{262}	—	July 29, 2014	Haleakala	Pan-STARRS 1	·	1.1 km	MPC · JPL
653377	2014 OV_{263}	—	August 20, 2006	Palomar	NEAT	·	980 m	MPC · JPL
653378	2014 OT_{279}	—	September 18, 2003	Palomar	NEAT	·	3.1 km	MPC · JPL
653379	2014 OU_{282}	—	September 23, 2004	Kitt Peak	Spacewatch	·	1.8 km	MPC · JPL
653380	2014 OS_{286}	—	March 11, 1996	Kitt Peak	Spacewatch	·	2.8 km	MPC · JPL
653381	2014 OX_{287}	—	July 29, 2014	Haleakala	Pan-STARRS 1	VER	2.3 km	MPC · JPL
653382	2014 OB_{289}	—	May 9, 2013	Haleakala	Pan-STARRS 1	·	1.7 km	MPC · JPL
653383	2014 OC_{289}	—	November 21, 2006	Catalina	CSS	·	1.3 km	MPC · JPL
653384	2014 OC_{292}	—	July 29, 2014	Haleakala	Pan-STARRS 1	·	1.3 km	MPC · JPL
653385	2014 OF_{294}	—	July 29, 2014	Haleakala	Pan-STARRS 1	·	1.4 km	MPC · JPL
653386	2014 OM_{294}	—	July 29, 2014	Haleakala	Pan-STARRS 1	·	1.2 km	MPC · JPL
653387	2014 OE_{300}	—	December 31, 2007	Kitt Peak	Spacewatch	·	1.9 km	MPC · JPL
653388	2014 OL_{300}	—	April 3, 2008	Mount Lemmon	Mount Lemmon Survey	·	1.3 km	MPC · JPL
653389	2014 OJ_{303}	—	December 4, 2007	Mount Lemmon	Mount Lemmon Survey	·	970 m	MPC · JPL
653390	2014 OR_{317}	—	March 5, 2002	Apache Point	SDSS	·	1.9 km	MPC · JPL
653391	2014 OH_{320}	—	July 29, 2014	Haleakala	Pan-STARRS 1	·	710 m	MPC · JPL
653392	2014 OH_{321}	—	April 8, 2006	Kitt Peak	Spacewatch	·	1.0 km	MPC · JPL
653393	2014 OE_{324}	—	December 29, 2008	Kitt Peak	Spacewatch	MAS	570 m	MPC · JPL
653394	2014 OZ_{324}	—	June 27, 2014	Haleakala	Pan-STARRS 1	·	840 m	MPC · JPL
653395	2014 OP_{333}	—	July 8, 2014	Haleakala	Pan-STARRS 1	PHO	750 m	MPC · JPL
653396	2014 OP_{337}	—	November 18, 2006	Kitt Peak	Spacewatch	·	2.1 km	MPC · JPL
653397	2014 OB_{338}	—	April 24, 2011	Haleakala	Pan-STARRS 1	H	450 m	MPC · JPL
653398	2014 OZ_{340}	—	June 18, 2010	Mount Lemmon	Mount Lemmon Survey	·	720 m	MPC · JPL
653399	2014 OY_{342}	—	July 28, 2014	Haleakala	Pan-STARRS 1	·	960 m	MPC · JPL
653400	2014 OS_{344}	—	July 28, 2014	Haleakala	Pan-STARRS 1	H	370 m	MPC · JPL

== 653401–653500 ==
back to top

Designation			Discovery			Properties		Ref
Permanent	Provisional	Named after	Date	Site	Discoverer(s)	Category	Diam.	Ref
653401	2014 OZ_{344}	—	September 21, 2009	Bergisch Gladbach	W. Bickel	·	3.1 km	MPC · JPL
653402	2014 OO_{348}	—	July 28, 2014	Haleakala	Pan-STARRS 1	3:2	4.5 km	MPC · JPL
653403	2014 OA_{358}	—	September 22, 2003	Kitt Peak	Spacewatch	·	1.0 km	MPC · JPL
653404	2014 OG_{360}	—	July 28, 2014	Haleakala	Pan-STARRS 1	·	1.2 km	MPC · JPL
653405	2014 ON_{371}	—	February 1, 2012	Kitt Peak	Spacewatch	BRG	1.1 km	MPC · JPL
653406	2014 OM_{372}	—	August 19, 2006	Kitt Peak	Spacewatch	·	990 m	MPC · JPL
653407	2014 OL_{374}	—	July 25, 2014	Haleakala	Pan-STARRS 1	·	1.2 km	MPC · JPL
653408	2014 OZ_{377}	—	August 28, 2006	Catalina	CSS	·	820 m	MPC · JPL
653409	2014 OK_{387}	—	July 21, 2006	Catalina	CSS	H	540 m	MPC · JPL
653410	2014 OX_{387}	—	August 22, 2005	Palomar	NEAT	·	1.7 km	MPC · JPL
653411	2014 OC_{388}	—	June 5, 2014	Haleakala	Pan-STARRS 1	PHO	900 m	MPC · JPL
653412	2014 OK_{388}	—	September 28, 2006	Kitt Peak	Spacewatch	·	1.0 km	MPC · JPL
653413	2014 OV_{390}	—	July 31, 2014	Haleakala	Pan-STARRS 1	·	1.9 km	MPC · JPL
653414	2014 OK_{393}	—	September 16, 2010	Catalina	CSS	EUN	1.3 km	MPC · JPL
653415	2014 OR_{398}	—	September 15, 2010	Kitt Peak	Spacewatch	·	780 m	MPC · JPL
653416	2014 OL_{399}	—	November 2, 2010	Mount Lemmon	Mount Lemmon Survey	·	1.8 km	MPC · JPL
653417	2014 OP_{400}	—	July 28, 2014	Haleakala	Pan-STARRS 1	·	1.1 km	MPC · JPL
653418	2014 OR_{400}	—	October 2, 2006	Mount Lemmon	Mount Lemmon Survey	·	1.3 km	MPC · JPL
653419	2014 OT_{400}	—	July 30, 2014	Haleakala	Pan-STARRS 1	(5)	920 m	MPC · JPL
653420	2014 ON_{401}	—	January 3, 2012	Kitt Peak	Spacewatch	·	1.0 km	MPC · JPL
653421	2014 OP_{401}	—	February 12, 2008	Mount Lemmon	Mount Lemmon Survey	EUN	1.0 km	MPC · JPL
653422	2014 OS_{412}	—	July 29, 2014	Haleakala	Pan-STARRS 1	(5)	890 m	MPC · JPL
653423	2014 OY_{413}	—	July 30, 2014	Haleakala	Pan-STARRS 1	·	1.2 km	MPC · JPL
653424	2014 OL_{414}	—	September 1, 2005	Palomar	NEAT	·	1.9 km	MPC · JPL
653425	2014 OO_{414}	—	July 31, 2014	Haleakala	Pan-STARRS 1	·	1.2 km	MPC · JPL
653426	2014 OC_{416}	—	July 25, 2014	Haleakala	Pan-STARRS 1	MAR	790 m	MPC · JPL
653427	2014 OZ_{431}	—	July 28, 2014	Haleakala	Pan-STARRS 1	·	890 m	MPC · JPL
653428	2014 OZ_{436}	—	July 28, 2014	Haleakala	Pan-STARRS 1	·	960 m	MPC · JPL
653429	2014 OP_{447}	—	July 25, 2014	Haleakala	Pan-STARRS 1	EUN	830 m	MPC · JPL
653430	2014 PJ_{5}	—	July 27, 2014	Haleakala	Pan-STARRS 1	·	910 m	MPC · JPL
653431	2014 PB_{7}	—	July 7, 2014	Haleakala	Pan-STARRS 1	·	870 m	MPC · JPL
653432	2014 PZ_{14}	—	February 20, 2012	Kitt Peak	Spacewatch	·	730 m	MPC · JPL
653433	2014 PT_{23}	—	March 3, 2013	Haleakala	Pan-STARRS 1	·	990 m	MPC · JPL
653434	2014 PA_{25}	—	July 25, 2014	Haleakala	Pan-STARRS 1	V	510 m	MPC · JPL
653435	2014 PE_{27}	—	July 25, 2014	Haleakala	Pan-STARRS 1	·	750 m	MPC · JPL
653436	2014 PA_{28}	—	September 28, 2006	Mount Lemmon	Mount Lemmon Survey	(5)	1.1 km	MPC · JPL
653437	2014 PX_{28}	—	January 26, 2006	Kitt Peak	Spacewatch	·	3.1 km	MPC · JPL
653438	2014 PU_{29}	—	August 28, 2006	Kitt Peak	Spacewatch	·	850 m	MPC · JPL
653439	2014 PQ_{33}	—	June 27, 2005	Kitt Peak	Spacewatch	·	1.4 km	MPC · JPL
653440	2014 PJ_{36}	—	January 9, 2007	Mount Lemmon	Mount Lemmon Survey	·	1.8 km	MPC · JPL
653441	2014 PP_{36}	—	October 25, 2005	Kitt Peak	Spacewatch	KOR	1.2 km	MPC · JPL
653442	2014 PE_{40}	—	July 28, 2014	Haleakala	Pan-STARRS 1	·	1.0 km	MPC · JPL
653443	2014 PQ_{40}	—	July 14, 2010	WISE	WISE	·	2.0 km	MPC · JPL
653444	2014 PK_{43}	—	December 25, 2010	Kitt Peak	Spacewatch	JUN	760 m	MPC · JPL
653445	2014 PX_{43}	—	August 4, 2014	Haleakala	Pan-STARRS 1	·	1.2 km	MPC · JPL
653446	2014 PY_{47}	—	July 25, 2014	Haleakala	Pan-STARRS 1	·	920 m	MPC · JPL
653447	2014 PM_{49}	—	August 27, 2009	Kitt Peak	Spacewatch	·	1.6 km	MPC · JPL
653448	2014 PK_{52}	—	December 29, 2011	Mount Lemmon	Mount Lemmon Survey	·	1.0 km	MPC · JPL
653449	2014 PH_{55}	—	April 10, 2013	Haleakala	Pan-STARRS 1	·	1.2 km	MPC · JPL
653450	2014 PD_{56}	—	April 5, 2002	Palomar	NEAT	·	1.1 km	MPC · JPL
653451	2014 PX_{68}	—	October 23, 2011	Haleakala	Pan-STARRS 1	·	550 m	MPC · JPL
653452	2014 PE_{70}	—	July 21, 2001	Haleakala	NEAT	·	1.6 km	MPC · JPL
653453	2014 PM_{70}	—	August 4, 2005	Palomar	NEAT	·	1.5 km	MPC · JPL
653454	2014 PJ_{73}	—	October 26, 2009	Mount Lemmon	Mount Lemmon Survey	·	2.5 km	MPC · JPL
653455	2014 PS_{74}	—	August 3, 2014	Haleakala	Pan-STARRS 1	·	810 m	MPC · JPL
653456	2014 PL_{76}	—	January 19, 2008	Mount Lemmon	Mount Lemmon Survey	EUN	840 m	MPC · JPL
653457	2014 PZ_{76}	—	August 4, 2014	Haleakala	Pan-STARRS 1	·	930 m	MPC · JPL
653458	2014 PV_{77}	—	August 6, 2014	Haleakala	Pan-STARRS 1	·	1.6 km	MPC · JPL
653459	2014 PB_{80}	—	April 10, 2013	Haleakala	Pan-STARRS 1	·	990 m	MPC · JPL
653460	2014 QD	—	August 16, 2014	Haleakala	Pan-STARRS 1	·	1.8 km	MPC · JPL
653461	2014 QW	—	August 23, 2003	Palomar	NEAT	PHO	800 m	MPC · JPL
653462	2014 QS_{1}	—	September 17, 2003	Palomar	NEAT	VER	3.3 km	MPC · JPL
653463	2014 QN_{4}	—	September 19, 2006	Kitt Peak	Spacewatch	EUN	820 m	MPC · JPL
653464	2014 QW_{9}	—	April 8, 2002	Palomar	NEAT	·	2.8 km	MPC · JPL
653465	2014 QT_{12}	—	August 18, 2014	Haleakala	Pan-STARRS 1	ADE	1.6 km	MPC · JPL
653466	2014 QE_{13}	—	June 3, 2014	Haleakala	Pan-STARRS 1	·	1.5 km	MPC · JPL
653467	2014 QS_{14}	—	August 18, 2014	Haleakala	Pan-STARRS 1	EUN	1.0 km	MPC · JPL
653468	2014 QA_{19}	—	October 2, 2010	Kitt Peak	Spacewatch	·	940 m	MPC · JPL
653469	2014 QZ_{20}	—	February 3, 2006	Mount Lemmon	Mount Lemmon Survey	EOS	2.2 km	MPC · JPL
653470	2014 QB_{21}	—	October 23, 2003	Apache Point	SDSS	·	2.6 km	MPC · JPL
653471	2014 QF_{21}	—	January 1, 2012	Mount Lemmon	Mount Lemmon Survey	·	2.8 km	MPC · JPL
653472	2014 QY_{23}	—	August 6, 2014	Haleakala	Pan-STARRS 1	·	1.2 km	MPC · JPL
653473	2014 QF_{24}	—	August 6, 2014	Haleakala	Pan-STARRS 1	ADE	1.3 km	MPC · JPL
653474	2014 QF_{27}	—	June 1, 2009	Mount Lemmon	Mount Lemmon Survey	MAR	840 m	MPC · JPL
653475	2014 QU_{40}	—	September 3, 2000	Apache Point	SDSS Collaboration	·	1.6 km	MPC · JPL
653476	2014 QE_{41}	—	June 29, 2005	Kitt Peak	Spacewatch	EUN	970 m	MPC · JPL
653477	2014 QF_{43}	—	September 22, 2003	Kitt Peak	Spacewatch	·	2.6 km	MPC · JPL
653478	2014 QP_{47}	—	February 24, 2012	Haleakala	Pan-STARRS 1	·	3.3 km	MPC · JPL
653479	2014 QA_{49}	—	March 15, 2013	Mount Lemmon	Mount Lemmon Survey	·	1.7 km	MPC · JPL
653480	2014 QZ_{52}	—	June 28, 2014	Kitt Peak	Spacewatch	·	960 m	MPC · JPL
653481	2014 QB_{62}	—	June 28, 2014	Flagstaff	Wasserman, L. H.	KOR	1.1 km	MPC · JPL
653482	2014 QX_{62}	—	February 10, 2008	Kitt Peak	Spacewatch	·	1.7 km	MPC · JPL
653483	2014 QO_{63}	—	September 2, 2010	Mount Lemmon	Mount Lemmon Survey	·	1.0 km	MPC · JPL
653484	2014 QN_{77}	—	June 3, 2014	Haleakala	Pan-STARRS 1	PHO	690 m	MPC · JPL
653485	2014 QE_{80}	—	August 20, 2014	Haleakala	Pan-STARRS 1	EOS	1.7 km	MPC · JPL
653486	2014 QG_{84}	—	August 22, 2009	Sandlot	G. Hug	EOS	1.7 km	MPC · JPL
653487	2014 QA_{100}	—	December 18, 2007	Mount Lemmon	Mount Lemmon Survey	(5)	840 m	MPC · JPL
653488	2014 QK_{111}	—	September 12, 2010	Mount Lemmon	Mount Lemmon Survey	·	1.1 km	MPC · JPL
653489	2014 QG_{112}	—	July 11, 2005	Bergisch Gladbach	W. Bickel	·	1.7 km	MPC · JPL
653490	2014 QP_{114}	—	August 20, 2014	Haleakala	Pan-STARRS 1	·	770 m	MPC · JPL
653491	2014 QL_{117}	—	November 16, 2009	Mount Lemmon	Mount Lemmon Survey	·	2.2 km	MPC · JPL
653492	2014 QN_{123}	—	July 7, 2014	Haleakala	Pan-STARRS 1	·	880 m	MPC · JPL
653493	2014 QB_{125}	—	November 19, 2007	Kitt Peak	Spacewatch	3:2	3.9 km	MPC · JPL
653494	2014 QB_{126}	—	January 2, 2012	Kitt Peak	Spacewatch	·	1.0 km	MPC · JPL
653495	2014 QH_{127}	—	August 18, 2010	ESA OGS	ESA OGS	·	1.1 km	MPC · JPL
653496	2014 QQ_{130}	—	July 28, 2014	Haleakala	Pan-STARRS 1	·	780 m	MPC · JPL
653497	2014 QX_{133}	—	September 30, 2010	Mount Lemmon	Mount Lemmon Survey	·	910 m	MPC · JPL
653498	2014 QU_{139}	—	October 24, 2003	Kitt Peak	Deep Ecliptic Survey	THM	2.3 km	MPC · JPL
653499	2014 QG_{140}	—	July 7, 2014	Haleakala	Pan-STARRS 1	MAR	1.0 km	MPC · JPL
653500	2014 QS_{150}	—	March 24, 2012	Mount Lemmon	Mount Lemmon Survey	·	1.9 km	MPC · JPL

== 653501–653600 ==
back to top

Designation			Discovery			Properties		Ref
Permanent	Provisional	Named after	Date	Site	Discoverer(s)	Category	Diam.	Ref
653501	2014 QL_{152}	—	November 5, 2007	Kitt Peak	Spacewatch	T_{j} (2.97) · 3:2	4.0 km	MPC · JPL
653502	2014 QC_{158}	—	September 14, 2007	Mount Lemmon	Mount Lemmon Survey	T_{j} (2.96) · 3:2	3.9 km	MPC · JPL
653503	2014 QY_{161}	—	April 19, 2013	Kitt Peak	Spacewatch	·	4.2 km	MPC · JPL
653504	2014 QS_{162}	—	February 11, 2008	Mount Lemmon	Mount Lemmon Survey	WIT	880 m	MPC · JPL
653505	2014 QT_{162}	—	March 18, 2013	Mount Lemmon	Mount Lemmon Survey	·	1.1 km	MPC · JPL
653506	2014 QN_{164}	—	August 21, 2006	Kitt Peak	Spacewatch	·	1.0 km	MPC · JPL
653507	2014 QD_{165}	—	July 25, 2014	Haleakala	Pan-STARRS 1	·	2.2 km	MPC · JPL
653508	2014 QS_{166}	—	August 22, 2014	Haleakala	Pan-STARRS 1	·	1.3 km	MPC · JPL
653509	2014 QB_{167}	—	April 15, 2013	Haleakala	Pan-STARRS 1	·	1.7 km	MPC · JPL
653510	2014 QZ_{167}	—	August 22, 2014	Haleakala	Pan-STARRS 1	JUN	810 m	MPC · JPL
653511	2014 QU_{171}	—	August 20, 2014	Haleakala	Pan-STARRS 1	(5)	830 m	MPC · JPL
653512	2014 QQ_{172}	—	June 13, 2005	Kitt Peak	Spacewatch	·	1.4 km	MPC · JPL
653513	2014 QK_{202}	—	February 21, 2012	Kitt Peak	Spacewatch	·	2.4 km	MPC · JPL
653514	2014 QC_{205}	—	October 23, 2006	Kitt Peak	Spacewatch	·	920 m	MPC · JPL
653515	2014 QV_{206}	—	December 4, 2007	Mount Lemmon	Mount Lemmon Survey	T_{j} (2.99) · 3:2 · SHU	3.9 km	MPC · JPL
653516	2014 QF_{216}	—	August 22, 2014	Haleakala	Pan-STARRS 1	·	1.2 km	MPC · JPL
653517	2014 QZ_{222}	—	September 17, 2006	Kitt Peak	Spacewatch	·	810 m	MPC · JPL
653518	2014 QU_{225}	—	August 16, 2009	Kitt Peak	Spacewatch	·	1.8 km	MPC · JPL
653519	2014 QK_{227}	—	April 10, 2013	Haleakala	Pan-STARRS 1	·	950 m	MPC · JPL
653520	2014 QH_{230}	—	August 22, 2014	Haleakala	Pan-STARRS 1	·	1.1 km	MPC · JPL
653521	2014 QX_{233}	—	August 22, 2014	Haleakala	Pan-STARRS 1	·	1.6 km	MPC · JPL
653522	2014 QB_{246}	—	May 2, 2013	Kitt Peak	Spacewatch	·	2.4 km	MPC · JPL
653523	2014 QH_{247}	—	August 22, 2014	Haleakala	Pan-STARRS 1	·	1.0 km	MPC · JPL
653524	2014 QB_{253}	—	August 22, 2014	Haleakala	Pan-STARRS 1	·	1.2 km	MPC · JPL
653525	2014 QD_{264}	—	September 29, 2009	Mount Lemmon	Mount Lemmon Survey	·	2.9 km	MPC · JPL
653526	2014 QA_{270}	—	March 19, 2013	Haleakala	Pan-STARRS 1	·	1.4 km	MPC · JPL
653527	2014 QV_{271}	—	July 1, 2014	Haleakala	Pan-STARRS 1	·	1.1 km	MPC · JPL
653528	2014 QY_{274}	—	August 23, 2014	Haleakala	Pan-STARRS 1	·	1.3 km	MPC · JPL
653529	2014 QP_{275}	—	April 12, 2007	Siding Spring	SSS	·	4.8 km	MPC · JPL
653530	2014 QQ_{279}	—	August 12, 2004	Cerro Tololo	Deep Ecliptic Survey	·	2.0 km	MPC · JPL
653531	2014 QT_{281}	—	May 7, 2006	Mount Lemmon	Mount Lemmon Survey	NYS	1.1 km	MPC · JPL
653532	2014 QJ_{282}	—	August 25, 2014	Haleakala	Pan-STARRS 1	·	1.2 km	MPC · JPL
653533	2014 QX_{282}	—	May 15, 2013	Haleakala	Pan-STARRS 1	TIR	2.5 km	MPC · JPL
653534	2014 QD_{288}	—	August 25, 2014	Haleakala	Pan-STARRS 1	MAR	920 m	MPC · JPL
653535	2014 QS_{293}	—	November 2, 2010	Mount Lemmon	Mount Lemmon Survey	·	1.4 km	MPC · JPL
653536	2014 QY_{297}	—	August 20, 2014	Haleakala	Pan-STARRS 1	·	860 m	MPC · JPL
653537	2014 QF_{304}	—	February 23, 2007	Kitt Peak	Spacewatch	THB	2.5 km	MPC · JPL
653538	2014 QM_{307}	—	October 29, 2010	Mount Lemmon	Mount Lemmon Survey	·	1.1 km	MPC · JPL
653539	2014 QK_{308}	—	August 24, 2014	Kitt Peak	Spacewatch	(5)	870 m	MPC · JPL
653540	2014 QX_{310}	—	March 19, 2013	Haleakala	Pan-STARRS 1	·	740 m	MPC · JPL
653541	2014 QW_{316}	—	July 7, 2014	Haleakala	Pan-STARRS 1	KOR	1.3 km	MPC · JPL
653542	2014 QG_{318}	—	August 3, 2014	Haleakala	Pan-STARRS 1	(5)	910 m	MPC · JPL
653543	2014 QS_{321}	—	August 25, 2014	Haleakala	Pan-STARRS 1	EUN	1.0 km	MPC · JPL
653544	2014 QN_{325}	—	January 19, 2012	Haleakala	Pan-STARRS 1	·	1.0 km	MPC · JPL
653545	2014 QR_{326}	—	October 29, 2010	Mount Lemmon	Mount Lemmon Survey	·	840 m	MPC · JPL
653546	2014 QC_{328}	—	August 25, 2014	Haleakala	Pan-STARRS 1	TIN	1.0 km	MPC · JPL
653547	2014 QW_{335}	—	September 29, 2003	Kitt Peak	Spacewatch	H	540 m	MPC · JPL
653548	2014 QZ_{335}	—	August 25, 2014	Haleakala	Pan-STARRS 1	·	1.3 km	MPC · JPL
653549	2014 QE_{339}	—	July 30, 2005	Palomar	NEAT	·	2.3 km	MPC · JPL
653550	2014 QC_{342}	—	September 16, 2003	Kitt Peak	Spacewatch	THM	1.9 km	MPC · JPL
653551	2014 QV_{344}	—	August 26, 2005	Palomar	NEAT	·	1.6 km	MPC · JPL
653552	2014 QR_{345}	—	July 2, 2014	Haleakala	Pan-STARRS 1	·	1.3 km	MPC · JPL
653553	2014 QA_{346}	—	July 4, 2014	Haleakala	Pan-STARRS 1	EUN	860 m	MPC · JPL
653554	2014 QC_{347}	—	June 5, 2014	Haleakala	Pan-STARRS 1	·	1.3 km	MPC · JPL
653555	2014 QL_{350}	—	August 20, 2014	Haleakala	Pan-STARRS 1	·	2.9 km	MPC · JPL
653556	2014 QT_{352}	—	November 17, 2006	Kitt Peak	Spacewatch	·	920 m	MPC · JPL
653557	2014 QM_{356}	—	March 22, 2001	Kitt Peak	Spacewatch	·	3.5 km	MPC · JPL
653558	2014 QA_{357}	—	July 29, 2008	Kitt Peak	Spacewatch	EOS	1.9 km	MPC · JPL
653559	2014 QJ_{358}	—	October 22, 2003	Apache Point	SDSS Collaboration	·	2.5 km	MPC · JPL
653560	2014 QT_{358}	—	February 11, 2004	Kitt Peak	Spacewatch	·	1.6 km	MPC · JPL
653561	2014 QA_{365}	—	June 9, 2011	Nogales	M. Schwartz, P. R. Holvorcem	H	660 m	MPC · JPL
653562	2014 QC_{365}	—	December 30, 2000	Socorro	LINEAR	·	960 m	MPC · JPL
653563	2014 QX_{367}	—	August 25, 2014	Haleakala	Pan-STARRS 1	·	1.6 km	MPC · JPL
653564 Genersich	2014 QP_{369}	Genersich	September 18, 2003	Piszkéstető	K. Sárneczky, B. Sipőcz	MAS	800 m	MPC · JPL
653565	2014 QQ_{370}	—	November 22, 2006	Mount Lemmon	Mount Lemmon Survey	·	860 m	MPC · JPL
653566	2014 QW_{378}	—	November 16, 2003	Apache Point	SDSS Collaboration	·	3.6 km	MPC · JPL
653567	2014 QT_{381}	—	November 8, 2010	Kitt Peak	Spacewatch	JUN · slow	890 m	MPC · JPL
653568	2014 QY_{382}	—	November 6, 2005	Mount Lemmon	Mount Lemmon Survey	·	880 m	MPC · JPL
653569	2014 QH_{385}	—	June 30, 2014	Haleakala	Pan-STARRS 1	EUN	1.1 km	MPC · JPL
653570	2014 QG_{386}	—	July 2, 2013	Haleakala	Pan-STARRS 1	·	2.7 km	MPC · JPL
653571	2014 QV_{388}	—	July 23, 2003	Palomar	NEAT	·	2.7 km	MPC · JPL
653572	2014 QA_{391}	—	October 9, 2007	Mount Lemmon	Mount Lemmon Survey	PHO	750 m	MPC · JPL
653573	2014 QD_{393}	—	September 29, 2003	Apache Point	SDSS Collaboration	HYG	2.5 km	MPC · JPL
653574	2014 QO_{393}	—	July 30, 2014	Haleakala	Pan-STARRS 1	JUN	820 m	MPC · JPL
653575	2014 QK_{399}	—	August 19, 2014	Haleakala	Pan-STARRS 1	·	990 m	MPC · JPL
653576	2014 QT_{401}	—	August 28, 2014	Haleakala	Pan-STARRS 1	·	1.4 km	MPC · JPL
653577	2014 QE_{403}	—	August 28, 2014	Haleakala	Pan-STARRS 1	·	650 m	MPC · JPL
653578	2014 QY_{405}	—	September 10, 2010	Kitt Peak	Spacewatch	·	850 m	MPC · JPL
653579	2014 QS_{406}	—	August 22, 2014	Haleakala	Pan-STARRS 1	·	1.8 km	MPC · JPL
653580	2014 QO_{408}	—	December 13, 2006	Mount Lemmon	Mount Lemmon Survey	·	1.9 km	MPC · JPL
653581	2014 QA_{412}	—	July 25, 2014	Haleakala	Pan-STARRS 1	·	720 m	MPC · JPL
653582	2014 QX_{414}	—	September 15, 2006	Kitt Peak	Spacewatch	·	710 m	MPC · JPL
653583	2014 QW_{415}	—	September 29, 2003	Kitt Peak	Spacewatch	·	4.0 km	MPC · JPL
653584	2014 QF_{416}	—	January 28, 2011	Catalina	CSS	·	2.4 km	MPC · JPL
653585	2014 QG_{427}	—	July 28, 2014	Haleakala	Pan-STARRS 1	·	580 m	MPC · JPL
653586	2014 QF_{431}	—	August 20, 2014	Haleakala	Pan-STARRS 1	HNS	770 m	MPC · JPL
653587	2014 QY_{431}	—	October 18, 2003	Kitt Peak	Spacewatch	THM	2.5 km	MPC · JPL
653588	2014 QS_{434}	—	October 23, 2003	Apache Point	SDSS Collaboration	·	2.5 km	MPC · JPL
653589	2014 QW_{441}	—	August 20, 2014	Haleakala	Pan-STARRS 1	cubewano (hot)	150 km	MPC · JPL
653590	2014 QH_{442}	—	February 11, 2013	Nogales	M. Schwartz, P. R. Holvorcem	H	440 m	MPC · JPL
653591	2014 QZ_{442}	—	October 2, 2006	Mount Lemmon	Mount Lemmon Survey	3:2	3.0 km	MPC · JPL
653592	2014 QE_{447}	—	November 29, 2005	Catalina	CSS	·	1.6 km	MPC · JPL
653593	2014 QM_{447}	—	August 22, 2014	Haleakala	Pan-STARRS 1	·	2.7 km	MPC · JPL
653594	2014 QO_{447}	—	February 2, 2006	Kitt Peak	Spacewatch	·	2.0 km	MPC · JPL
653595	2014 QS_{447}	—	April 25, 2007	Kitt Peak	Spacewatch	·	3.3 km	MPC · JPL
653596	2014 QU_{447}	—	January 25, 2006	Kitt Peak	Spacewatch	·	2.8 km	MPC · JPL
653597	2014 QR_{448}	—	March 16, 2012	Mount Lemmon	Mount Lemmon Survey	EOS	1.8 km	MPC · JPL
653598	2014 QW_{451}	—	September 27, 2006	Mount Lemmon	Mount Lemmon Survey	3:2	4.1 km	MPC · JPL
653599	2014 QH_{452}	—	August 27, 2014	Haleakala	Pan-STARRS 1	·	1.4 km	MPC · JPL
653600	2014 QK_{456}	—	November 14, 2001	Kitt Peak	Spacewatch	·	1.7 km	MPC · JPL

== 653601–653700 ==
back to top

Designation			Discovery			Properties		Ref
Permanent	Provisional	Named after	Date	Site	Discoverer(s)	Category	Diam.	Ref
653601	2014 QB_{457}	—	May 18, 2002	Kitt Peak	Spacewatch	·	2.5 km	MPC · JPL
653602	2014 QA_{458}	—	October 21, 2003	Kitt Peak	Spacewatch	·	2.0 km	MPC · JPL
653603	2014 QD_{461}	—	August 20, 2014	Haleakala	Pan-STARRS 1	·	1.2 km	MPC · JPL
653604	2014 QK_{461}	—	November 6, 2005	Kitt Peak	Spacewatch	·	1.9 km	MPC · JPL
653605	2014 QV_{462}	—	January 1, 2012	Mount Lemmon	Mount Lemmon Survey	·	870 m	MPC · JPL
653606	2014 QP_{470}	—	August 28, 2014	Haleakala	Pan-STARRS 1	·	1.4 km	MPC · JPL
653607	2014 QE_{471}	—	August 25, 2014	Mayhill-ISON	L. Elenin	·	1.3 km	MPC · JPL
653608	2014 QL_{471}	—	August 8, 2005	Cerro Tololo	Deep Ecliptic Survey	·	1.3 km	MPC · JPL
653609	2014 QF_{472}	—	March 30, 2004	Kitt Peak	Spacewatch	·	1.2 km	MPC · JPL
653610	2014 QH_{473}	—	August 31, 2014	Haleakala	Pan-STARRS 1	·	930 m	MPC · JPL
653611	2014 QS_{473}	—	August 31, 2014	Haleakala	Pan-STARRS 1	·	1.5 km	MPC · JPL
653612	2014 QT_{473}	—	August 31, 2014	Haleakala	Pan-STARRS 1	·	1.5 km	MPC · JPL
653613	2014 QJ_{476}	—	August 6, 2014	Haleakala	Pan-STARRS 1	·	790 m	MPC · JPL
653614	2014 QW_{476}	—	October 17, 2010	Mount Lemmon	Mount Lemmon Survey	·	1.2 km	MPC · JPL
653615	2014 QV_{478}	—	October 20, 2003	Kitt Peak	Spacewatch	V	690 m	MPC · JPL
653616	2014 QO_{482}	—	December 30, 2005	Kitt Peak	Spacewatch	·	1.8 km	MPC · JPL
653617	2014 QM_{483}	—	October 1, 2010	Kitt Peak	Spacewatch	·	850 m	MPC · JPL
653618	2014 QE_{485}	—	February 3, 2012	Haleakala	Pan-STARRS 1	KOR	1.1 km	MPC · JPL
653619	2014 QC_{495}	—	August 30, 2014	Haleakala	Pan-STARRS 1	H	470 m	MPC · JPL
653620	2014 QQ_{495}	—	August 28, 2014	Haleakala	Pan-STARRS 1	PHO	830 m	MPC · JPL
653621	2014 QO_{496}	—	August 23, 2014	Haleakala	Pan-STARRS 1	·	1.6 km	MPC · JPL
653622	2014 QD_{519}	—	August 31, 2014	Mount Lemmon	Mount Lemmon Survey	·	1.2 km	MPC · JPL
653623	2014 QA_{520}	—	August 27, 2014	Haleakala	Pan-STARRS 1	·	1.1 km	MPC · JPL
653624	2014 QV_{527}	—	August 20, 2014	Haleakala	Pan-STARRS 1	H	440 m	MPC · JPL
653625	2014 QL_{547}	—	August 25, 2014	Haleakala	Pan-STARRS 1	ADE	1.5 km	MPC · JPL
653626	2014 QY_{547}	—	August 20, 2014	Haleakala	Pan-STARRS 1	·	1.2 km	MPC · JPL
653627	2014 QZ_{547}	—	August 26, 2014	Haleakala	Pan-STARRS 1	·	1.2 km	MPC · JPL
653628	2014 QJ_{548}	—	August 28, 2014	Haleakala	Pan-STARRS 1	·	1.1 km	MPC · JPL
653629	2014 QS_{566}	—	August 31, 2014	Haleakala	Pan-STARRS 1	·	1.1 km	MPC · JPL
653630	2014 QH_{574}	—	August 30, 2014	Mount Lemmon	Mount Lemmon Survey	·	1.6 km	MPC · JPL
653631	2014 QE_{578}	—	April 19, 2013	Haleakala	Pan-STARRS 1	·	1.3 km	MPC · JPL
653632	2014 RH	—	August 13, 2006	Palomar	NEAT	T_{j} (2.87)	8.4 km	MPC · JPL
653633	2014 RZ	—	October 15, 2004	Anderson Mesa	LONEOS	·	660 m	MPC · JPL
653634	2014 RB_{1}	—	June 24, 2014	Haleakala	Pan-STARRS 1	·	1.1 km	MPC · JPL
653635	2014 RE_{6}	—	October 11, 2007	Kitt Peak	Spacewatch	3:2	3.8 km	MPC · JPL
653636	2014 RF_{8}	—	September 12, 2001	Kitt Peak	Spacewatch	·	1.3 km	MPC · JPL
653637	2014 RM_{12}	—	May 19, 2007	Haleakala	Brown, T.	·	930 m	MPC · JPL
653638	2014 RP_{20}	—	July 28, 2014	Haleakala	Pan-STARRS 1	·	820 m	MPC · JPL
653639	2014 RU_{22}	—	January 11, 2003	Kitt Peak	Spacewatch	·	1.1 km	MPC · JPL
653640	2014 RV_{22}	—	July 30, 2014	Haleakala	Pan-STARRS 1	·	1.4 km	MPC · JPL
653641	2014 RF_{25}	—	October 24, 2005	Mauna Kea	A. Boattini	·	2.7 km	MPC · JPL
653642	2014 RQ_{31}	—	August 29, 2002	Palomar	NEAT	·	910 m	MPC · JPL
653643	2014 RQ_{32}	—	July 30, 2014	Kitt Peak	Spacewatch	·	2.0 km	MPC · JPL
653644	2014 RK_{33}	—	October 24, 2005	Mauna Kea	A. Boattini	·	3.6 km	MPC · JPL
653645	2014 RD_{36}	—	September 28, 2006	Kitt Peak	Spacewatch	·	880 m	MPC · JPL
653646	2014 RL_{38}	—	September 2, 2005	Palomar	NEAT	·	1.7 km	MPC · JPL
653647	2014 RL_{39}	—	November 5, 2007	Kitt Peak	Spacewatch	3:2	3.7 km	MPC · JPL
653648	2014 RL_{40}	—	September 16, 2009	Catalina	CSS	·	2.6 km	MPC · JPL
653649	2014 RD_{41}	—	August 23, 2014	Haleakala	Pan-STARRS 1	T_{j} (2.97) · 3:2 · (6124)	4.9 km	MPC · JPL
653650	2014 RG_{41}	—	November 30, 2005	Kitt Peak	Spacewatch	EOS	2.2 km	MPC · JPL
653651	2014 RD_{43}	—	August 25, 2014	Haleakala	Pan-STARRS 1	·	900 m	MPC · JPL
653652	2014 RF_{46}	—	September 10, 2008	Kitt Peak	Spacewatch	·	3.2 km	MPC · JPL
653653	2014 RL_{50}	—	September 11, 2005	Kitt Peak	Spacewatch	·	1.5 km	MPC · JPL
653654	2014 RT_{58}	—	August 27, 2014	Haleakala	Pan-STARRS 1	·	2.3 km	MPC · JPL
653655	2014 RH_{63}	—	March 25, 2007	Mount Lemmon	Mount Lemmon Survey	·	3.6 km	MPC · JPL
653656	2014 RX_{64}	—	January 24, 2007	Mount Lemmon	Mount Lemmon Survey	·	1.0 km	MPC · JPL
653657	2014 RJ_{65}	—	April 16, 2013	Cerro Tololo-DECam	DECam	EUN	1.0 km	MPC · JPL
653658	2014 RV_{66}	—	November 9, 2009	Mount Lemmon	Mount Lemmon Survey	·	2.9 km	MPC · JPL
653659	2014 RM_{71}	—	September 1, 2014	Mount Lemmon	Mount Lemmon Survey	·	1.6 km	MPC · JPL
653660	2014 RY_{76}	—	September 2, 2014	Mount Lemmon	Mount Lemmon Survey	·	1.3 km	MPC · JPL
653661	2014 RE_{82}	—	October 14, 2010	Mount Lemmon	Mount Lemmon Survey	·	1.3 km	MPC · JPL
653662	2014 RP_{84}	—	September 2, 2014	Haleakala	Pan-STARRS 1	·	850 m	MPC · JPL
653663	2014 SY_{3}	—	September 26, 2006	Mount Lemmon	Mount Lemmon Survey	MAR	880 m	MPC · JPL
653664	2014 SO_{4}	—	August 28, 2014	Haleakala	Pan-STARRS 1	EOS	2.0 km	MPC · JPL
653665	2014 SH_{8}	—	September 2, 2010	Mount Lemmon	Mount Lemmon Survey	·	850 m	MPC · JPL
653666	2014 SE_{15}	—	August 20, 2014	Haleakala	Pan-STARRS 1	·	920 m	MPC · JPL
653667 Dănuționescu	2014 SV_{15}	Dănuționescu	February 27, 2012	La Palma	EURONEAR	KOR	1.2 km	MPC · JPL
653668	2014 SB_{16}	—	May 10, 2005	Mount Lemmon	Mount Lemmon Survey	·	760 m	MPC · JPL
653669	2014 SA_{20}	—	October 22, 2009	Mount Lemmon	Mount Lemmon Survey	·	2.1 km	MPC · JPL
653670	2014 SD_{42}	—	July 7, 2014	Haleakala	Pan-STARRS 1	MAR	810 m	MPC · JPL
653671	2014 SZ_{69}	—	August 20, 2014	Haleakala	Pan-STARRS 1	·	980 m	MPC · JPL
653672	2014 ST_{76}	—	March 15, 2007	Kitt Peak	Spacewatch	·	3.0 km	MPC · JPL
653673	2014 SL_{86}	—	September 18, 2014	Haleakala	Pan-STARRS 1	·	1.1 km	MPC · JPL
653674	2014 SG_{87}	—	December 15, 2006	Kitt Peak	Spacewatch	·	1.0 km	MPC · JPL
653675	2014 SP_{93}	—	October 11, 2010	Mount Lemmon	Mount Lemmon Survey	·	1.2 km	MPC · JPL
653676	2014 SC_{101}	—	November 30, 2010	Mount Lemmon	Mount Lemmon Survey	·	1.1 km	MPC · JPL
653677	2014 ST_{104}	—	March 8, 2008	Mount Lemmon	Mount Lemmon Survey	·	890 m	MPC · JPL
653678	2014 SA_{114}	—	September 18, 2014	Haleakala	Pan-STARRS 1	·	1.2 km	MPC · JPL
653679	2014 SF_{114}	—	October 10, 2005	Kitt Peak	Spacewatch	(12739)	1.5 km	MPC · JPL
653680	2014 SE_{116}	—	November 14, 2010	Kitt Peak	Spacewatch	·	1.2 km	MPC · JPL
653681	2014 SQ_{117}	—	September 18, 2014	Haleakala	Pan-STARRS 1	·	900 m	MPC · JPL
653682	2014 SC_{120}	—	August 19, 2001	Cerro Tololo	Deep Ecliptic Survey	·	1.0 km	MPC · JPL
653683	2014 SS_{122}	—	August 27, 2014	Haleakala	Pan-STARRS 1	·	1.1 km	MPC · JPL
653684	2014 SF_{127}	—	September 2, 2014	Haleakala	Pan-STARRS 1	3:2	3.7 km	MPC · JPL
653685	2014 SC_{129}	—	October 13, 2010	Kitt Peak	Spacewatch	·	1.0 km	MPC · JPL
653686	2014 SC_{135}	—	March 28, 2012	Haleakala	Pan-STARRS 1	·	1.4 km	MPC · JPL
653687	2014 SO_{137}	—	April 10, 2013	Mount Lemmon	Mount Lemmon Survey	·	1.1 km	MPC · JPL
653688	2014 SQ_{140}	—	March 31, 2008	Mount Lemmon	Mount Lemmon Survey	·	1.3 km	MPC · JPL
653689	2014 SZ_{147}	—	October 8, 2007	Mount Lemmon	Mount Lemmon Survey	·	1.2 km	MPC · JPL
653690	2014 SF_{150}	—	July 31, 2014	Haleakala	Pan-STARRS 1	·	900 m	MPC · JPL
653691	2014 SV_{152}	—	November 8, 2010	Kitt Peak	Spacewatch	·	1.0 km	MPC · JPL
653692	2014 SF_{157}	—	October 25, 2005	Kitt Peak	Spacewatch	·	1.8 km	MPC · JPL
653693	2014 SM_{157}	—	August 28, 2014	Haleakala	Pan-STARRS 1	·	1.1 km	MPC · JPL
653694	2014 SB_{158}	—	November 12, 2010	Mount Lemmon	Mount Lemmon Survey	(5)	950 m	MPC · JPL
653695	2014 ST_{159}	—	September 19, 2014	Haleakala	Pan-STARRS 1	·	1.5 km	MPC · JPL
653696	2014 SS_{163}	—	August 31, 2005	Kitt Peak	Spacewatch	EUN	1.1 km	MPC · JPL
653697	2014 SE_{170}	—	January 18, 2012	Mount Lemmon	Mount Lemmon Survey	PHO	920 m	MPC · JPL
653698	2014 SR_{170}	—	September 3, 2014	Catalina	CSS	·	2.1 km	MPC · JPL
653699	2014 SR_{181}	—	August 27, 2014	Haleakala	Pan-STARRS 1	·	1.2 km	MPC · JPL
653700	2014 SH_{183}	—	August 20, 2014	Haleakala	Pan-STARRS 1	·	1.1 km	MPC · JPL

== 653701–653800 ==
back to top

Designation			Discovery			Properties		Ref
Permanent	Provisional	Named after	Date	Site	Discoverer(s)	Category	Diam.	Ref
653701	2014 SA_{188}	—	August 27, 2014	Haleakala	Pan-STARRS 1	·	1.2 km	MPC · JPL
653702	2014 ST_{190}	—	August 29, 2005	Kitt Peak	Spacewatch	·	1.4 km	MPC · JPL
653703	2014 SP_{191}	—	September 20, 2014	Haleakala	Pan-STARRS 1	EUN	810 m	MPC · JPL
653704	2014 SK_{193}	—	September 3, 2010	Mount Lemmon	Mount Lemmon Survey	·	1.4 km	MPC · JPL
653705	2014 SN_{200}	—	November 1, 2006	Mount Lemmon	Mount Lemmon Survey	(5)	760 m	MPC · JPL
653706	2014 SP_{202}	—	September 20, 2014	Haleakala	Pan-STARRS 1	·	1.3 km	MPC · JPL
653707	2014 SJ_{203}	—	November 16, 2006	Mount Lemmon	Mount Lemmon Survey	·	870 m	MPC · JPL
653708	2014 SK_{204}	—	July 31, 2014	Haleakala	Pan-STARRS 1	RAF	700 m	MPC · JPL
653709	2014 SR_{208}	—	October 23, 2001	Palomar	NEAT	(1547)	1.1 km	MPC · JPL
653710	2014 SA_{212}	—	August 31, 2014	Haleakala	Pan-STARRS 1	DOR	1.6 km	MPC · JPL
653711	2014 SZ_{213}	—	September 4, 2014	Haleakala	Pan-STARRS 1	MAR	770 m	MPC · JPL
653712	2014 SV_{216}	—	January 11, 2011	Mount Lemmon	Mount Lemmon Survey	·	1.2 km	MPC · JPL
653713	2014 SJ_{219}	—	September 4, 2014	Haleakala	Pan-STARRS 1	·	1.2 km	MPC · JPL
653714	2014 SO_{222}	—	April 12, 2004	Kitt Peak	Spacewatch	·	2.0 km	MPC · JPL
653715	2014 SX_{223}	—	March 31, 2008	Kitt Peak	Spacewatch	H	350 m	MPC · JPL
653716	2014 SR_{229}	—	August 27, 2014	Haleakala	Pan-STARRS 1	(194)	1.0 km	MPC · JPL
653717	2014 SZ_{230}	—	September 19, 2014	Haleakala	Pan-STARRS 1	·	760 m	MPC · JPL
653718	2014 SH_{236}	—	September 20, 2014	Haleakala	Pan-STARRS 1	·	820 m	MPC · JPL
653719	2014 SN_{239}	—	September 10, 2010	Mount Lemmon	Mount Lemmon Survey	·	1.2 km	MPC · JPL
653720	2014 SJ_{241}	—	August 23, 2014	Haleakala	Pan-STARRS 1	·	980 m	MPC · JPL
653721	2014 SK_{244}	—	July 31, 2014	Haleakala	Pan-STARRS 1	·	3.8 km	MPC · JPL
653722	2014 SZ_{245}	—	February 16, 2012	Haleakala	Pan-STARRS 1	·	1.4 km	MPC · JPL
653723	2014 SK_{253}	—	September 20, 2006	Catalina	CSS	3:2	5.1 km	MPC · JPL
653724	2014 SU_{253}	—	September 10, 2005	Goodricke-Pigott	R. A. Tucker	·	1.9 km	MPC · JPL
653725	2014 SK_{254}	—	January 17, 2007	Kitt Peak	Spacewatch	·	1.4 km	MPC · JPL
653726	2014 SE_{262}	—	March 10, 2011	Kitt Peak	Spacewatch	·	410 m	MPC · JPL
653727	2014 SB_{266}	—	September 13, 2014	Haleakala	Pan-STARRS 1	·	710 m	MPC · JPL
653728	2014 SE_{270}	—	April 15, 2010	Mount Lemmon	Mount Lemmon Survey	·	620 m	MPC · JPL
653729	2014 SF_{277}	—	September 2, 2014	Kitt Peak	Spacewatch	·	2.3 km	MPC · JPL
653730	2014 SO_{282}	—	July 29, 2005	Palomar	NEAT	·	1.3 km	MPC · JPL
653731	2014 SB_{286}	—	January 10, 2003	Kitt Peak	Spacewatch	·	1 km	MPC · JPL
653732	2014 SO_{286}	—	September 14, 2014	Haleakala	Pan-STARRS 1	·	610 m	MPC · JPL
653733	2014 SW_{290}	—	November 6, 2008	Mount Lemmon	Mount Lemmon Survey	·	580 m	MPC · JPL
653734	2014 SR_{292}	—	September 2, 2014	Haleakala	Pan-STARRS 1	·	1.2 km	MPC · JPL
653735	2014 SN_{306}	—	September 28, 2006	Kitt Peak	Spacewatch	·	880 m	MPC · JPL
653736	2014 SX_{311}	—	September 19, 2006	Catalina	CSS	3:2 · SHU	4.6 km	MPC · JPL
653737	2014 SU_{314}	—	August 30, 2005	Kitt Peak	Spacewatch	·	1.1 km	MPC · JPL
653738	2014 SF_{317}	—	December 12, 2006	Mount Lemmon	Mount Lemmon Survey	·	1.2 km	MPC · JPL
653739	2014 SR_{317}	—	March 19, 2013	Haleakala	Pan-STARRS 1	·	460 m	MPC · JPL
653740	2014 SP_{327}	—	September 26, 2014	Kitt Peak	Spacewatch	·	1.1 km	MPC · JPL
653741	2014 SQ_{328}	—	September 26, 2014	Catalina	CSS	EUN	870 m	MPC · JPL
653742	2014 SL_{329}	—	October 23, 2006	Catalina	CSS	·	1.3 km	MPC · JPL
653743	2014 SX_{330}	—	September 19, 2014	Haleakala	Pan-STARRS 1	·	1.2 km	MPC · JPL
653744	2014 SS_{343}	—	February 26, 2012	Kitt Peak	Spacewatch	·	1.7 km	MPC · JPL
653745	2014 SQ_{352}	—	September 20, 2014	Haleakala	Pan-STARRS 1	MAR	750 m	MPC · JPL
653746	2014 SW_{352}	—	September 23, 2014	Mount Lemmon	Mount Lemmon Survey	(5)	830 m	MPC · JPL
653747	2014 SY_{352}	—	August 3, 2000	Kitt Peak	Spacewatch	·	1.4 km	MPC · JPL
653748	2014 SX_{353}	—	September 20, 2014	Mount Lemmon	Mount Lemmon Survey	MAR	950 m	MPC · JPL
653749	2014 SC_{357}	—	September 18, 2014	Haleakala	Pan-STARRS 1	·	1.3 km	MPC · JPL
653750	2014 SB_{358}	—	September 19, 2014	Haleakala	Pan-STARRS 1	·	1.6 km	MPC · JPL
653751	2014 SP_{358}	—	November 3, 2010	Kitt Peak	Spacewatch	·	1.5 km	MPC · JPL
653752	2014 SD_{360}	—	October 31, 2010	Mount Lemmon	Mount Lemmon Survey	·	840 m	MPC · JPL
653753	2014 SR_{360}	—	November 14, 2010	Kitt Peak	Spacewatch	·	1.1 km	MPC · JPL
653754	2014 SL_{380}	—	September 18, 2014	Haleakala	Pan-STARRS 1	·	1.4 km	MPC · JPL
653755	2014 SW_{393}	—	September 20, 2014	Haleakala	Pan-STARRS 1	·	1 km	MPC · JPL
653756	2014 SF_{405}	—	September 19, 2014	Haleakala	Pan-STARRS 1	(12739)	1.3 km	MPC · JPL
653757	2014 SJ_{405}	—	September 18, 2014	Haleakala	Pan-STARRS 1	WIT	780 m	MPC · JPL
653758	2014 TU_{2}	—	October 1, 2014	Catalina	CSS	·	960 m	MPC · JPL
653759	2014 TE_{5}	—	April 26, 2004	Mauna Kea	P. A. Wiegert, D. D. Balam	ADE	1.6 km	MPC · JPL
653760	2014 TX_{9}	—	August 25, 2014	Haleakala	Pan-STARRS 1	·	1.2 km	MPC · JPL
653761	2014 TY_{13}	—	October 5, 2005	Mount Lemmon	Mount Lemmon Survey	·	1.3 km	MPC · JPL
653762	2014 TL_{16}	—	October 26, 2005	Kitt Peak	Spacewatch	AEO	840 m	MPC · JPL
653763	2014 TO_{18}	—	August 25, 2014	Haleakala	Pan-STARRS 1	·	1.5 km	MPC · JPL
653764	2014 TG_{19}	—	October 14, 2001	Kitt Peak	Spacewatch	MIS	2.0 km	MPC · JPL
653765	2014 TD_{21}	—	March 31, 2008	Mount Lemmon	Mount Lemmon Survey	·	1.3 km	MPC · JPL
653766	2014 TR_{22}	—	October 26, 2005	Kitt Peak	Spacewatch	·	1.1 km	MPC · JPL
653767	2014 TL_{23}	—	September 2, 2014	Haleakala	Pan-STARRS 1	·	1.0 km	MPC · JPL
653768	2014 TQ_{23}	—	September 23, 2014	Mount Lemmon	Mount Lemmon Survey	·	910 m	MPC · JPL
653769	2014 TB_{27}	—	September 22, 2014	Kitt Peak	Spacewatch	·	1.3 km	MPC · JPL
653770	2014 TR_{31}	—	March 8, 2008	Mount Lemmon	Mount Lemmon Survey	·	960 m	MPC · JPL
653771	2014 TO_{34}	—	February 8, 2002	Kitt Peak	Spacewatch	H	430 m	MPC · JPL
653772	2014 TC_{37}	—	August 31, 2014	Haleakala	Pan-STARRS 1	·	1.3 km	MPC · JPL
653773	2014 TF_{38}	—	October 1, 2014	Haleakala	Pan-STARRS 1	·	910 m	MPC · JPL
653774	2014 TQ_{39}	—	October 12, 2014	Catalina	CSS	EUN	870 m	MPC · JPL
653775	2014 TP_{40}	—	October 20, 2007	Mount Lemmon	Mount Lemmon Survey	·	880 m	MPC · JPL
653776	2014 TM_{44}	—	October 2, 2014	Haleakala	Pan-STARRS 1	·	1.0 km	MPC · JPL
653777	2014 TY_{47}	—	December 13, 2010	Mount Lemmon	Mount Lemmon Survey	·	1.2 km	MPC · JPL
653778	2014 TT_{49}	—	November 1, 2005	Kitt Peak	Spacewatch	AGN	950 m	MPC · JPL
653779	2014 TZ_{49}	—	April 22, 2007	Mount Lemmon	Mount Lemmon Survey	·	1.5 km	MPC · JPL
653780	2014 TB_{52}	—	October 24, 2011	Haleakala	Pan-STARRS 1	·	750 m	MPC · JPL
653781	2014 TF_{54}	—	October 14, 2014	Kitt Peak	Spacewatch	·	1.1 km	MPC · JPL
653782	2014 TN_{60}	—	July 13, 2013	Haleakala	Pan-STARRS 1	(260)	2.9 km	MPC · JPL
653783	2014 TM_{61}	—	February 26, 2008	Mount Lemmon	Mount Lemmon Survey	·	2.0 km	MPC · JPL
653784	2014 TQ_{61}	—	September 25, 2014	Kitt Peak	Spacewatch	TEL	1.6 km	MPC · JPL
653785	2014 TU_{61}	—	September 25, 2014	Kitt Peak	Spacewatch	NEM	1.7 km	MPC · JPL
653786	2014 TZ_{61}	—	January 17, 2007	Kitt Peak	Spacewatch	·	1.1 km	MPC · JPL
653787	2014 TK_{62}	—	September 13, 2005	Kitt Peak	Spacewatch	·	1.6 km	MPC · JPL
653788	2014 TK_{65}	—	October 21, 2007	Mount Lemmon	Mount Lemmon Survey	·	810 m	MPC · JPL
653789	2014 TB_{68}	—	October 17, 2010	Mount Lemmon	Mount Lemmon Survey	·	980 m	MPC · JPL
653790	2014 TS_{74}	—	August 16, 2009	Kitt Peak	Spacewatch	MRX	870 m	MPC · JPL
653791	2014 TF_{79}	—	October 14, 2014	Mount Lemmon	Mount Lemmon Survey	DOR	2.4 km	MPC · JPL
653792	2014 TK_{85}	—	November 21, 2003	Palomar	NEAT	TIR	2.6 km	MPC · JPL
653793	2014 TM_{85}	—	October 30, 2010	Kitt Peak	Spacewatch	(1547)	1.5 km	MPC · JPL
653794	2014 TG_{87}	—	October 3, 2014	Mount Lemmon	Mount Lemmon Survey	·	1.5 km	MPC · JPL
653795	2014 TY_{87}	—	October 2, 2014	Haleakala	Pan-STARRS 1	EUN	780 m	MPC · JPL
653796	2014 TH_{88}	—	November 3, 2010	Mount Lemmon	Mount Lemmon Survey	·	1.4 km	MPC · JPL
653797	2014 TL_{91}	—	April 12, 2013	Haleakala	Pan-STARRS 1	·	1.5 km	MPC · JPL
653798	2014 TO_{94}	—	December 2, 2010	Mount Lemmon	Mount Lemmon Survey	·	1.3 km	MPC · JPL
653799	2014 TT_{94}	—	May 15, 2013	Haleakala	Pan-STARRS 1	·	1.8 km	MPC · JPL
653800	2014 TE_{100}	—	October 14, 2014	Mount Lemmon	Mount Lemmon Survey	·	1.1 km	MPC · JPL

== 653801–653900 ==
back to top

Designation			Discovery			Properties		Ref
Permanent	Provisional	Named after	Date	Site	Discoverer(s)	Category	Diam.	Ref
653801	2014 TZ_{100}	—	December 12, 2015	Haleakala	Pan-STARRS 1	EUN	1.3 km	MPC · JPL
653802	2014 TG_{103}	—	October 2, 2014	Haleakala	Pan-STARRS 1	·	1.2 km	MPC · JPL
653803	2014 TW_{103}	—	October 1, 2014	Kitt Peak	Spacewatch	·	810 m	MPC · JPL
653804	2014 TV_{105}	—	October 1, 2014	Haleakala	Pan-STARRS 1	·	860 m	MPC · JPL
653805	2014 TJ_{111}	—	October 5, 2014	Kitt Peak	Spacewatch	·	1.3 km	MPC · JPL
653806	2014 TH_{119}	—	November 2, 2010	Mount Lemmon	Mount Lemmon Survey	·	1.1 km	MPC · JPL
653807	2014 UK	—	December 13, 2001	Socorro	LINEAR	·	1.5 km	MPC · JPL
653808	2014 UN_{3}	—	October 17, 2014	Mount Lemmon	Mount Lemmon Survey	·	1.3 km	MPC · JPL
653809	2014 UR_{3}	—	September 11, 2010	Mount Lemmon	Mount Lemmon Survey	·	1.0 km	MPC · JPL
653810	2014 UT_{10}	—	October 16, 2014	Mount Lemmon	Mount Lemmon Survey	·	1.2 km	MPC · JPL
653811	2014 UF_{12}	—	October 3, 2014	Mount Lemmon	Mount Lemmon Survey	·	970 m	MPC · JPL
653812	2014 UF_{17}	—	January 13, 2011	Kitt Peak	Spacewatch	·	1.7 km	MPC · JPL
653813	2014 UE_{20}	—	October 18, 2014	Mount Lemmon	Mount Lemmon Survey	·	1.4 km	MPC · JPL
653814	2014 UD_{21}	—	September 29, 2005	Mount Lemmon	Mount Lemmon Survey	·	1.4 km	MPC · JPL
653815	2014 UE_{27}	—	October 29, 2010	Mount Lemmon	Mount Lemmon Survey	(5)	820 m	MPC · JPL
653816	2014 UY_{30}	—	September 1, 2005	Kitt Peak	Spacewatch	·	1.3 km	MPC · JPL
653817	2014 UQ_{38}	—	October 2, 2005	Mount Lemmon	Mount Lemmon Survey	·	1.3 km	MPC · JPL
653818	2014 UL_{40}	—	October 18, 2014	Mount Lemmon	Mount Lemmon Survey	AEO	810 m	MPC · JPL
653819	2014 UJ_{47}	—	October 21, 2014	Kitt Peak	Spacewatch	·	1.2 km	MPC · JPL
653820	2014 UW_{47}	—	November 19, 2001	Socorro	LINEAR	ADE	1.8 km	MPC · JPL
653821	2014 UR_{49}	—	October 21, 2014	Kitt Peak	Spacewatch	GEF	900 m	MPC · JPL
653822	2014 UT_{50}	—	October 21, 2014	Kitt Peak	Spacewatch	·	1.1 km	MPC · JPL
653823	2014 UG_{52}	—	September 14, 2014	Catalina	CSS	·	1.6 km	MPC · JPL
653824	2014 UF_{58}	—	September 2, 2014	Haleakala	Pan-STARRS 1	·	650 m	MPC · JPL
653825	2014 UB_{62}	—	August 31, 2014	Haleakala	Pan-STARRS 1	EUN	950 m	MPC · JPL
653826	2014 UM_{63}	—	October 5, 2014	Mount Lemmon	Mount Lemmon Survey	·	1.4 km	MPC · JPL
653827	2014 UU_{64}	—	March 23, 2012	Mount Lemmon	Mount Lemmon Survey	·	1.4 km	MPC · JPL
653828	2014 UJ_{68}	—	November 16, 2006	Lulin	LUSS	(5)	940 m	MPC · JPL
653829	2014 UC_{70}	—	October 21, 2014	Mount Lemmon	Mount Lemmon Survey	·	990 m	MPC · JPL
653830	2014 UK_{76}	—	October 21, 2014	Mount Lemmon	Mount Lemmon Survey	·	1.7 km	MPC · JPL
653831	2014 UE_{82}	—	October 19, 1998	Kitt Peak	Spacewatch	3:2	3.7 km	MPC · JPL
653832	2014 UH_{83}	—	October 3, 2014	Mount Lemmon	Mount Lemmon Survey	·	2.4 km	MPC · JPL
653833	2014 UX_{83}	—	January 14, 2011	Mount Lemmon	Mount Lemmon Survey	·	1.0 km	MPC · JPL
653834	2014 UM_{89}	—	September 24, 2014	Kitt Peak	Spacewatch	·	1.0 km	MPC · JPL
653835	2014 UB_{91}	—	March 13, 2012	Mount Lemmon	Mount Lemmon Survey	·	1.2 km	MPC · JPL
653836	2014 UJ_{92}	—	October 14, 2014	Kitt Peak	Spacewatch	·	1.1 km	MPC · JPL
653837	2014 UW_{93}	—	January 24, 2003	La Silla	A. Boattini, Hainaut, O.	·	1.2 km	MPC · JPL
653838	2014 UM_{94}	—	October 22, 2014	Mount Lemmon	Mount Lemmon Survey	L5	9.4 km	MPC · JPL
653839	2014 UB_{95}	—	October 28, 1997	Kitt Peak	Spacewatch	·	1.1 km	MPC · JPL
653840	2014 UH_{100}	—	September 18, 2001	Apache Point	SDSS Collaboration	·	1.1 km	MPC · JPL
653841	2014 UM_{101}	—	October 24, 2014	Kitt Peak	Spacewatch	T_{j} (2.99) · 3:2	4.2 km	MPC · JPL
653842	2014 UH_{110}	—	September 25, 2014	Kitt Peak	Spacewatch	·	510 m	MPC · JPL
653843	2014 UC_{111}	—	November 2, 2010	Mount Lemmon	Mount Lemmon Survey	EUN	900 m	MPC · JPL
653844	2014 UU_{113}	—	March 23, 2003	Kitt Peak	Spacewatch	·	1.1 km	MPC · JPL
653845	2014 UK_{120}	—	April 7, 2008	Mount Lemmon	Mount Lemmon Survey	·	1.7 km	MPC · JPL
653846	2014 UV_{120}	—	November 25, 2005	Kitt Peak	Spacewatch	·	1.3 km	MPC · JPL
653847	2014 UV_{124}	—	July 16, 2005	Kitt Peak	Spacewatch	3:2	4.9 km	MPC · JPL
653848	2014 UW_{125}	—	November 1, 2005	Anderson Mesa	LONEOS	·	2.0 km	MPC · JPL
653849	2014 UD_{126}	—	April 6, 2008	Mount Lemmon	Mount Lemmon Survey	·	1.1 km	MPC · JPL
653850	2014 UJ_{127}	—	October 14, 2014	Kitt Peak	Spacewatch	NEM	1.8 km	MPC · JPL
653851	2014 UM_{133}	—	October 25, 2005	Kitt Peak	Spacewatch	AEO	850 m	MPC · JPL
653852	2014 UV_{136}	—	September 18, 2001	Apache Point	SDSS Collaboration	·	1.3 km	MPC · JPL
653853	2014 UU_{138}	—	October 17, 2014	Kitt Peak	Spacewatch	·	1.2 km	MPC · JPL
653854	2014 US_{139}	—	September 3, 2000	Apache Point	SDSS Collaboration	·	1.4 km	MPC · JPL
653855	2014 UV_{140}	—	March 16, 2012	Kitt Peak	Spacewatch	(5)	1.0 km	MPC · JPL
653856	2014 UU_{142}	—	December 25, 2010	Mount Lemmon	Mount Lemmon Survey	·	1.2 km	MPC · JPL
653857	2014 UV_{143}	—	February 1, 2003	Apache Point	SDSS Collaboration	(194)	1.2 km	MPC · JPL
653858	2014 UW_{149}	—	October 21, 2014	Kitt Peak	Spacewatch	·	610 m	MPC · JPL
653859	2014 UH_{150}	—	May 15, 2013	Kitt Peak	Spacewatch	·	1.6 km	MPC · JPL
653860	2014 UL_{150}	—	February 9, 2006	Palomar	NEAT	·	880 m	MPC · JPL
653861	2014 UQ_{151}	—	January 5, 2011	Mount Lemmon	Mount Lemmon Survey	·	1.3 km	MPC · JPL
653862	2014 UM_{153}	—	October 2, 2014	Haleakala	Pan-STARRS 1	NEM	1.8 km	MPC · JPL
653863	2014 UF_{156}	—	October 1, 2005	Mount Lemmon	Mount Lemmon Survey	·	1.2 km	MPC · JPL
653864	2014 UZ_{157}	—	November 16, 2009	Mount Lemmon	Mount Lemmon Survey	·	1.2 km	MPC · JPL
653865	2014 UX_{158}	—	December 21, 2005	Kitt Peak	Spacewatch	DOR	2.1 km	MPC · JPL
653866	2014 UO_{159}	—	October 25, 2014	Haleakala	Pan-STARRS 1	·	1.6 km	MPC · JPL
653867	2014 UZ_{159}	—	October 25, 2014	Haleakala	Pan-STARRS 1	·	930 m	MPC · JPL
653868	2014 UP_{162}	—	March 31, 2012	Mount Lemmon	Mount Lemmon Survey	·	1.1 km	MPC · JPL
653869	2014 UC_{169}	—	September 29, 2008	Kitt Peak	Spacewatch	VER	2.2 km	MPC · JPL
653870	2014 UA_{174}	—	October 21, 2003	Kitt Peak	Spacewatch	·	2.2 km	MPC · JPL
653871	2014 UD_{174}	—	August 31, 2005	Kitt Peak	Spacewatch	·	1.3 km	MPC · JPL
653872	2014 UZ_{178}	—	November 8, 2010	Kitt Peak	Spacewatch	·	1.0 km	MPC · JPL
653873	2014 UM_{180}	—	September 26, 2014	Kitt Peak	Spacewatch	·	1.5 km	MPC · JPL
653874	2014 UD_{182}	—	October 14, 2014	Kitt Peak	Spacewatch	·	1.9 km	MPC · JPL
653875	2014 UK_{183}	—	August 31, 2014	Haleakala	Pan-STARRS 1	·	1.4 km	MPC · JPL
653876	2014 UG_{187}	—	October 13, 2014	Kitt Peak	Spacewatch	(5)	930 m	MPC · JPL
653877	2014 UO_{188}	—	January 17, 2007	Mount Lemmon	Mount Lemmon Survey	·	960 m	MPC · JPL
653878	2014 US_{188}	—	October 25, 2005	Kitt Peak	Spacewatch	·	1.7 km	MPC · JPL
653879	2014 US_{189}	—	November 4, 2005	Kitt Peak	Spacewatch	·	1.3 km	MPC · JPL
653880	2014 UL_{194}	—	March 11, 2007	Mount Lemmon	Mount Lemmon Survey	·	1.6 km	MPC · JPL
653881	2014 UJ_{201}	—	October 2, 2014	Haleakala	Pan-STARRS 1	·	1.2 km	MPC · JPL
653882	2014 UL_{207}	—	October 6, 2005	Kitt Peak	Spacewatch	·	1.5 km	MPC · JPL
653883	2014 UZ_{210}	—	October 10, 2010	Catalina	CSS	·	1.8 km	MPC · JPL
653884	2014 UQ_{214}	—	September 29, 2003	Kitt Peak	Spacewatch	·	1.8 km	MPC · JPL
653885	2014 UN_{219}	—	April 22, 2004	Siding Spring	SSS	·	2.1 km	MPC · JPL
653886	2014 UY_{222}	—	July 1, 2013	Haleakala	Pan-STARRS 1	T_{j} (2.93)	4.6 km	MPC · JPL
653887	2014 UT_{227}	—	October 9, 2008	Mount Lemmon	Mount Lemmon Survey	·	3.3 km	MPC · JPL
653888	2014 UU_{227}	—	February 10, 2008	Mount Lemmon	Mount Lemmon Survey	EUN	1.1 km	MPC · JPL
653889	2014 UQ_{231}	—	October 20, 2014	Mount Lemmon	Mount Lemmon Survey	·	1.9 km	MPC · JPL
653890	2014 UK_{233}	—	October 29, 2014	Haleakala	Pan-STARRS 1	·	1.4 km	MPC · JPL
653891	2014 US_{233}	—	August 19, 2009	Kitt Peak	Spacewatch	DOR	2.1 km	MPC · JPL
653892	2014 UR_{234}	—	April 28, 2003	Kitt Peak	Spacewatch	·	1.3 km	MPC · JPL
653893	2014 UQ_{235}	—	November 13, 2010	Mount Lemmon	Mount Lemmon Survey	·	960 m	MPC · JPL
653894	2014 UP_{236}	—	October 26, 2014	Mount Lemmon	Mount Lemmon Survey	·	1.4 km	MPC · JPL
653895	2014 UG_{237}	—	October 27, 2014	Haleakala	Pan-STARRS 1	·	1.6 km	MPC · JPL
653896	2014 UR_{238}	—	October 28, 2014	Haleakala	Pan-STARRS 1	·	1.7 km	MPC · JPL
653897	2014 UT_{238}	—	October 28, 2014	Haleakala	Pan-STARRS 1	·	1.3 km	MPC · JPL
653898	2014 UE_{239}	—	October 29, 2014	Kitt Peak	Spacewatch	·	1.0 km	MPC · JPL
653899	2014 US_{239}	—	December 4, 2010	Mount Lemmon	Mount Lemmon Survey	·	1.2 km	MPC · JPL
653900	2014 UE_{247}	—	October 18, 2014	Mount Lemmon	Mount Lemmon Survey	JUN	1.0 km	MPC · JPL

== 653901–654000 ==
back to top

Designation			Discovery			Properties		Ref
Permanent	Provisional	Named after	Date	Site	Discoverer(s)	Category	Diam.	Ref
653901	2014 UP_{258}	—	October 21, 2014	Kitt Peak	Spacewatch	·	910 m	MPC · JPL
653902	2014 UQ_{258}	—	October 30, 2014	Haleakala	Pan-STARRS 1	HNS	900 m	MPC · JPL
653903	2014 UT_{273}	—	October 17, 2014	Mount Lemmon	Mount Lemmon Survey	·	990 m	MPC · JPL
653904	2014 VV_{7}	—	October 12, 2005	Kitt Peak	Spacewatch	·	1.1 km	MPC · JPL
653905	2014 VY_{8}	—	November 11, 2007	Mount Lemmon	Mount Lemmon Survey	V	630 m	MPC · JPL
653906	2014 VW_{9}	—	October 12, 2007	Kitt Peak	Spacewatch	·	560 m	MPC · JPL
653907	2014 VF_{16}	—	November 14, 2014	Kitt Peak	Spacewatch	GEF	990 m	MPC · JPL
653908	2014 VN_{16}	—	October 16, 2014	Kitt Peak	Spacewatch	·	1.1 km	MPC · JPL
653909	2014 VE_{17}	—	October 29, 2014	Catalina	CSS	·	1.5 km	MPC · JPL
653910	2014 VP_{18}	—	March 23, 2003	Kitt Peak	Spacewatch	JUN	960 m	MPC · JPL
653911	2014 VB_{20}	—	November 12, 2014	Haleakala	Pan-STARRS 1	·	1.3 km	MPC · JPL
653912	2014 VD_{24}	—	November 12, 2014	Haleakala	Pan-STARRS 1	·	1.3 km	MPC · JPL
653913	2014 VR_{27}	—	November 26, 2010	Mount Lemmon	Mount Lemmon Survey	MAR	1.1 km	MPC · JPL
653914	2014 VE_{30}	—	February 17, 2007	Kitt Peak	Spacewatch	·	1.1 km	MPC · JPL
653915	2014 VT_{35}	—	November 15, 2014	Mount Lemmon	Mount Lemmon Survey	·	1.5 km	MPC · JPL
653916	2014 VO_{37}	—	November 5, 2010	Mount Lemmon	Mount Lemmon Survey	·	1.3 km	MPC · JPL
653917	2014 VL_{38}	—	November 10, 2014	Haleakala	Pan-STARRS 1	EUN	860 m	MPC · JPL
653918	2014 VZ_{41}	—	November 1, 2014	Mount Lemmon	Mount Lemmon Survey	·	1.4 km	MPC · JPL
653919	2014 VX_{43}	—	November 13, 2014	Kitt Peak	Spacewatch	·	1.7 km	MPC · JPL
653920	2014 WE	—	June 19, 2009	Kitt Peak	Spacewatch	·	420 m	MPC · JPL
653921	2014 WM_{1}	—	November 16, 2014	Mount Lemmon	Mount Lemmon Survey	·	1.2 km	MPC · JPL
653922	2014 WL_{2}	—	February 5, 2011	Mount Lemmon	Mount Lemmon Survey	AEO	860 m	MPC · JPL
653923	2014 WM_{9}	—	October 14, 2014	Kitt Peak	Spacewatch	·	1.4 km	MPC · JPL
653924	2014 WK_{10}	—	October 28, 2014	Haleakala	Pan-STARRS 1	·	870 m	MPC · JPL
653925	2014 WN_{13}	—	September 22, 2001	Socorro	LINEAR	·	1.3 km	MPC · JPL
653926	2014 WR_{14}	—	November 16, 2014	Mount Lemmon	Mount Lemmon Survey	·	960 m	MPC · JPL
653927	2014 WK_{18}	—	November 4, 2014	Mount Lemmon	Mount Lemmon Survey	·	1.2 km	MPC · JPL
653928	2014 WG_{22}	—	November 17, 2014	Mount Lemmon	Mount Lemmon Survey	·	1.5 km	MPC · JPL
653929	2014 WL_{22}	—	March 31, 2012	Kitt Peak	Spacewatch	·	1.2 km	MPC · JPL
653930	2014 WO_{22}	—	May 12, 2002	Palomar	NEAT	·	2.5 km	MPC · JPL
653931	2014 WB_{23}	—	October 25, 2014	Haleakala	Pan-STARRS 1	·	1.1 km	MPC · JPL
653932	2014 WL_{24}	—	November 16, 2006	Kitt Peak	Spacewatch	T_{j} (2.99) · 3:2 · SHU	4.1 km	MPC · JPL
653933	2014 WE_{26}	—	August 22, 1995	Kitt Peak	Spacewatch	·	1.4 km	MPC · JPL
653934	2014 WH_{27}	—	August 1, 2009	Siding Spring	SSS	·	1.4 km	MPC · JPL
653935	2014 WK_{28}	—	October 25, 2005	Mount Lemmon	Mount Lemmon Survey	·	1.3 km	MPC · JPL
653936	2014 WL_{29}	—	May 24, 2000	Kitt Peak	Spacewatch	JUN	890 m	MPC · JPL
653937	2014 WX_{34}	—	December 9, 2010	Kitt Peak	Spacewatch	·	1.3 km	MPC · JPL
653938	2014 WW_{35}	—	November 17, 2014	Haleakala	Pan-STARRS 1	·	1.4 km	MPC · JPL
653939	2014 WO_{37}	—	October 16, 2014	Kitt Peak	Spacewatch	·	940 m	MPC · JPL
653940	2014 WF_{39}	—	October 26, 2014	Mount Lemmon	Mount Lemmon Survey	·	1.3 km	MPC · JPL
653941	2014 WX_{42}	—	October 25, 2014	Haleakala	Pan-STARRS 1	·	1.0 km	MPC · JPL
653942	2014 WR_{52}	—	November 4, 2014	Mount Lemmon	Mount Lemmon Survey	·	1.3 km	MPC · JPL
653943	2014 WB_{55}	—	January 17, 2007	Kitt Peak	Spacewatch	(5)	980 m	MPC · JPL
653944	2014 WM_{58}	—	September 30, 2010	Mount Lemmon	Mount Lemmon Survey	NYS	1.1 km	MPC · JPL
653945	2014 WK_{60}	—	December 5, 2010	Kitt Peak	Spacewatch	·	1.2 km	MPC · JPL
653946	2014 WA_{61}	—	January 11, 2011	Catalina	CSS	·	1.6 km	MPC · JPL
653947	2014 WT_{61}	—	November 17, 2014	Mount Lemmon	Mount Lemmon Survey	MAR	770 m	MPC · JPL
653948	2014 WE_{64}	—	October 28, 2014	Haleakala	Pan-STARRS 1	·	1.3 km	MPC · JPL
653949	2014 WZ_{66}	—	January 10, 2007	Kitt Peak	Spacewatch	·	1.1 km	MPC · JPL
653950	2014 WZ_{73}	—	October 22, 2014	Mount Lemmon	Mount Lemmon Survey	·	1.4 km	MPC · JPL
653951	2014 WO_{81}	—	October 29, 2005	Kitt Peak	Spacewatch	·	1.3 km	MPC · JPL
653952	2014 WW_{85}	—	November 17, 2014	Mount Lemmon	Mount Lemmon Survey	·	1.3 km	MPC · JPL
653953	2014 WL_{89}	—	October 27, 2005	Kitt Peak	Spacewatch	·	1.8 km	MPC · JPL
653954	2014 WC_{97}	—	July 15, 2013	Haleakala	Pan-STARRS 1	·	1.1 km	MPC · JPL
653955	2014 WN_{97}	—	August 16, 2009	Kitt Peak	Spacewatch	·	1.4 km	MPC · JPL
653956	2014 WL_{99}	—	July 5, 2008	Bergisch Gladbach	W. Bickel	·	1.7 km	MPC · JPL
653957	2014 WA_{101}	—	November 17, 2014	Mount Lemmon	Mount Lemmon Survey	·	2.2 km	MPC · JPL
653958	2014 WL_{102}	—	March 24, 2006	Kitt Peak	Spacewatch	EOS	2.2 km	MPC · JPL
653959	2014 WY_{103}	—	November 17, 2014	Haleakala	Pan-STARRS 1	·	1.4 km	MPC · JPL
653960	2014 WF_{105}	—	October 4, 2014	Kitt Peak	Spacewatch	·	950 m	MPC · JPL
653961	2014 WU_{105}	—	March 12, 2008	Mount Lemmon	Mount Lemmon Survey	·	910 m	MPC · JPL
653962	2014 WD_{111}	—	August 26, 2005	Palomar	NEAT	·	1.2 km	MPC · JPL
653963	2014 WF_{113}	—	September 2, 2014	Haleakala	Pan-STARRS 1	·	1.4 km	MPC · JPL
653964	2014 WL_{114}	—	July 31, 2005	Palomar	NEAT	JUN	890 m	MPC · JPL
653965	2014 WO_{114}	—	January 25, 2012	Haleakala	Pan-STARRS 1	·	1.3 km	MPC · JPL
653966	2014 WY_{114}	—	October 28, 2014	Haleakala	Pan-STARRS 1	·	1.5 km	MPC · JPL
653967	2014 WN_{116}	—	August 31, 2005	Kitt Peak	Spacewatch	·	1.4 km	MPC · JPL
653968	2014 WT_{124}	—	November 4, 2014	Mount Lemmon	Mount Lemmon Survey	(1547)	1.4 km	MPC · JPL
653969	2014 WN_{127}	—	August 24, 2003	Cerro Tololo	Deep Ecliptic Survey	·	870 m	MPC · JPL
653970	2014 WL_{128}	—	August 11, 2004	Palomar	NEAT	·	2.1 km	MPC · JPL
653971	2014 WJ_{136}	—	November 17, 2014	Haleakala	Pan-STARRS 1	·	1.7 km	MPC · JPL
653972	2014 WR_{137}	—	November 1, 2005	Kitt Peak	Spacewatch	·	1.4 km	MPC · JPL
653973	2014 WX_{137}	—	August 4, 2013	Bergisch Gladbach	W. Bickel	EOS	1.6 km	MPC · JPL
653974	2014 WJ_{139}	—	January 11, 2008	Kitt Peak	Spacewatch	3:2 · SHU	4.1 km	MPC · JPL
653975	2014 WH_{146}	—	August 25, 2005	Palomar	NEAT	MIS	2.6 km	MPC · JPL
653976	2014 WK_{146}	—	October 1, 2005	Kitt Peak	Spacewatch	·	1.4 km	MPC · JPL
653977	2014 WJ_{147}	—	November 12, 2006	Mount Lemmon	Mount Lemmon Survey	(5)	750 m	MPC · JPL
653978	2014 WW_{156}	—	November 1, 2014	Kitt Peak	Spacewatch	·	1.6 km	MPC · JPL
653979	2014 WJ_{160}	—	October 8, 2008	Kitt Peak	Spacewatch	·	2.5 km	MPC · JPL
653980	2014 WT_{160}	—	August 14, 2001	Palomar	NEAT	·	1.5 km	MPC · JPL
653981	2014 WF_{162}	—	October 26, 2014	Mount Lemmon	Mount Lemmon Survey	·	1.3 km	MPC · JPL
653982	2014 WV_{165}	—	November 17, 2006	Mount Lemmon	Mount Lemmon Survey	(5)	840 m	MPC · JPL
653983	2014 WZ_{165}	—	November 11, 2006	Kitt Peak	Spacewatch	·	1.0 km	MPC · JPL
653984	2014 WW_{168}	—	October 29, 2014	Haleakala	Pan-STARRS 1	·	900 m	MPC · JPL
653985	2014 WU_{169}	—	August 25, 2014	Haleakala	Pan-STARRS 1	·	1.1 km	MPC · JPL
653986	2014 WS_{171}	—	December 13, 2010	Mount Lemmon	Mount Lemmon Survey	·	1.1 km	MPC · JPL
653987	2014 WU_{172}	—	September 16, 2009	Catalina	CSS	·	2.8 km	MPC · JPL
653988	2014 WZ_{172}	—	August 26, 2014	Haleakala	Pan-STARRS 1	·	1.6 km	MPC · JPL
653989	2014 WV_{179}	—	March 5, 2008	Kitt Peak	Spacewatch	·	970 m	MPC · JPL
653990	2014 WW_{190}	—	December 25, 2010	Kitt Peak	Spacewatch	·	1.2 km	MPC · JPL
653991	2014 WC_{196}	—	November 1, 2014	Mount Lemmon	Mount Lemmon Survey	GEF	860 m	MPC · JPL
653992	2014 WH_{205}	—	November 17, 2014	Kitt Peak	Spacewatch	·	1.5 km	MPC · JPL
653993	2014 WE_{209}	—	November 17, 2014	Haleakala	Pan-STARRS 1	·	1.2 km	MPC · JPL
653994	2014 WM_{210}	—	December 1, 2010	Mount Lemmon	Mount Lemmon Survey	BRG	1.2 km	MPC · JPL
653995	2014 WN_{213}	—	November 18, 2014	Kitt Peak	Spacewatch	JUN	860 m	MPC · JPL
653996	2014 WQ_{215}	—	August 30, 2014	Haleakala	Pan-STARRS 1	·	2.1 km	MPC · JPL
653997	2014 WV_{215}	—	October 29, 2014	Haleakala	Pan-STARRS 1	PAD	1.2 km	MPC · JPL
653998	2014 WA_{219}	—	September 14, 2007	Mount Lemmon	Mount Lemmon Survey	·	3.8 km	MPC · JPL
653999	2014 WG_{219}	—	November 17, 2014	Mount Lemmon	Mount Lemmon Survey	·	1.7 km	MPC · JPL
654000	2014 WT_{219}	—	November 17, 2014	Mount Lemmon	Mount Lemmon Survey	·	1.3 km	MPC · JPL

back to top

== Meaning of names ==
As minor planet discoveries are confirmed, they are given a permanent number by the IAU's Minor Planet Center (MPC), and the discoverers can then submit names for them, following the IAU's naming conventions. The list below concerns those minor planets in the specified number-range that have received names, and explains the meanings of those names.

Official naming citations of newly named small Solar System bodies are approved and published in a bulletin by IAU's Working Group for Small Bodies Nomenclature (WGSBN). Before May 2021, citations were published in MPC's Minor Planet Circulars for many decades. Recent citations can also be found on the JPL Small-Body Database (SBDB). Until his death in 2016, German astronomer Lutz D. Schmadel compiled these citations into the Dictionary of Minor Planet Names (DMP) and regularly updated the collection.

Based on Paul Herget's The Names of the Minor Planets, Schmadel also researched the unclear origin of numerous asteroids, most of which had been named prior to World War II. This article incorporates text from this source, which is in the public domain: SBDB New namings may only be added to this list below after official publication as the preannouncement of names is condemned. The WGSBN publishes a comprehensive guideline for the naming rules of non-cometary small Solar System bodies.

Named minor planet	Provisional	This minor planet was named for...	Ref · Catalog
653564 Genersich	2014 QP_{369}	Margit Genersich (1878–1918), Hungarian ophthalmologist and the second woman to graduate from the University of Budapest.	IAU · 653564
653667 Dănuționescu	2014 SV_{15}	Dănuț Ionescu, Romanian road engineer and amateur astronomer.	IAU · 653667
