= List of minor planets: 665001–666000 =

The following is a partial list of minor planets, running from minor-planet number 665001 through 666000, inclusive. The primary data for this and other partial lists is based on JPL's "Small-Body Orbital Elements" and data available from the Minor Planet Center. Critical list information is also provided by the MPC, unless otherwise specified from Lowell Observatory. A detailed description of the table's columns and additional sources are given on the main page including a complete list of every page in this series, and a statistical break-up on the dynamical classification of minor planets.

Also see the summary list of all named bodies in numerical and alphabetical order, and the corresponding naming citations for the number range of this particular list. New namings may only be added to this list after official publication, as the preannouncement of names is condemned by the Working Group for Small Bodies Nomenclature of the International Astronomical Union.

Near-Earth obj.	MBA (inner)	MBA (outer)	Centaur
Mars-crosser	MBA (middle)	Jupiter trojan	Trans-Neptunian obj.
Unclassified

== 665001–665100 ==
Designation			Discovery			Properties		Ref
Permanent	Provisional	Named after	Date	Site	Discoverer(s)	Category	Diam.	Ref
665001	2008 WO_{6}	—	November 1, 2008	Kitt Peak	Spacewatch	H	420 m	MPC · JPL
665002	2008 WS_{8}	—	November 8, 2008	Mount Lemmon	Mount Lemmon Survey	·	1.5 km	MPC · JPL
665003	2008 WG_{9}	—	October 31, 2008	Kitt Peak	Spacewatch	·	670 m	MPC · JPL
665004	2008 WG_{12}	—	November 7, 2008	Mount Lemmon	Mount Lemmon Survey	NYS	680 m	MPC · JPL
665005	2008 WK_{15}	—	November 17, 2008	Kitt Peak	Spacewatch	·	600 m	MPC · JPL
665006	2008 WL_{18}	—	October 9, 2008	Kitt Peak	Spacewatch	V	470 m	MPC · JPL
665007	2008 WA_{23}	—	October 23, 2008	Kitt Peak	Spacewatch	ELF	3.7 km	MPC · JPL
665008	2008 WH_{27}	—	October 9, 2008	Mount Lemmon	Mount Lemmon Survey	·	1.7 km	MPC · JPL
665009	2008 WV_{27}	—	October 20, 2008	Kitt Peak	Spacewatch	·	720 m	MPC · JPL
665010	2008 WO_{28}	—	November 19, 2008	Mount Lemmon	Mount Lemmon Survey	·	1.5 km	MPC · JPL
665011	2008 WU_{36}	—	February 27, 2006	Mount Lemmon	Mount Lemmon Survey	·	620 m	MPC · JPL
665012	2008 WZ_{37}	—	November 17, 2008	Kitt Peak	Spacewatch	·	1.7 km	MPC · JPL
665013	2008 WT_{42}	—	October 3, 2008	Mount Lemmon	Mount Lemmon Survey	·	770 m	MPC · JPL
665014	2008 WX_{43}	—	November 9, 2008	Kitt Peak	Spacewatch	·	3.0 km	MPC · JPL
665015	2008 WV_{45}	—	November 17, 2008	Kitt Peak	Spacewatch	MAS	600 m	MPC · JPL
665016	2008 WN_{48}	—	October 15, 2004	Mount Lemmon	Mount Lemmon Survey	·	870 m	MPC · JPL
665017	2008 WN_{49}	—	November 2, 2008	Mount Lemmon	Mount Lemmon Survey	·	1.9 km	MPC · JPL
665018	2008 WJ_{54}	—	October 29, 2008	Kitt Peak	Spacewatch	·	970 m	MPC · JPL
665019	2008 WD_{55}	—	October 9, 2008	Kitt Peak	Spacewatch	·	1.5 km	MPC · JPL
665020	2008 WY_{55}	—	November 20, 2008	Mount Lemmon	Mount Lemmon Survey	·	800 m	MPC · JPL
665021	2008 WM_{58}	—	February 2, 2006	Mount Lemmon	Mount Lemmon Survey	V	710 m	MPC · JPL
665022	2008 WV_{58}	—	November 21, 2008	Kitt Peak	Spacewatch	PHO	1.0 km	MPC · JPL
665023	2008 WY_{60}	—	October 23, 2008	Kitt Peak	Spacewatch	H	590 m	MPC · JPL
665024	2008 WE_{61}	—	October 26, 2008	Mount Lemmon	Mount Lemmon Survey	·	3.1 km	MPC · JPL
665025	2008 WH_{61}	—	March 26, 2007	Catalina	CSS	H	590 m	MPC · JPL
665026	2008 WB_{71}	—	October 1, 2002	Haleakala	NEAT	·	2.9 km	MPC · JPL
665027	2008 WL_{71}	—	October 30, 2008	Kitt Peak	Spacewatch	·	1.8 km	MPC · JPL
665028	2008 WM_{78}	—	October 24, 2008	Kitt Peak	Spacewatch	·	1.2 km	MPC · JPL
665029	2008 WF_{80}	—	September 11, 2004	Kitt Peak	Spacewatch	·	650 m	MPC · JPL
665030	2008 WS_{83}	—	November 20, 2008	Kitt Peak	Spacewatch	·	1.3 km	MPC · JPL
665031	2008 WN_{84}	—	November 20, 2008	Mount Lemmon	Mount Lemmon Survey	EOS	2.5 km	MPC · JPL
665032	2008 WE_{86}	—	October 6, 2008	Kitt Peak	Spacewatch	·	1.1 km	MPC · JPL
665033	2008 WS_{86}	—	October 23, 2008	Kitt Peak	Spacewatch	·	1.3 km	MPC · JPL
665034	2008 WT_{90}	—	October 8, 2008	Kitt Peak	Spacewatch	·	1.6 km	MPC · JPL
665035	2008 WD_{94}	—	November 7, 2008	Mount Lemmon	Mount Lemmon Survey	H	570 m	MPC · JPL
665036	2008 WB_{101}	—	November 9, 2008	Kitt Peak	Spacewatch	·	1.2 km	MPC · JPL
665037	2008 WQ_{102}	—	November 19, 2008	Catalina	CSS	·	2.1 km	MPC · JPL
665038	2008 WZ_{104}	—	April 2, 2006	Mount Lemmon	Mount Lemmon Survey	AST	1.5 km	MPC · JPL
665039	2008 WB_{108}	—	October 20, 1995	Kitt Peak	Spacewatch	·	1.2 km	MPC · JPL
665040	2008 WC_{108}	—	September 19, 2003	Palomar	NEAT	·	2.1 km	MPC · JPL
665041	2008 WT_{109}	—	September 24, 2003	Haleakala	NEAT	(18466)	2.1 km	MPC · JPL
665042	2008 WD_{111}	—	March 24, 2006	Mount Lemmon	Mount Lemmon Survey	MAS	560 m	MPC · JPL
665043	2008 WQ_{118}	—	November 30, 2008	Mount Lemmon	Mount Lemmon Survey	·	740 m	MPC · JPL
665044	2008 WZ_{118}	—	November 19, 2003	Kitt Peak	Spacewatch	·	1.5 km	MPC · JPL
665045	2008 WZ_{125}	—	November 24, 2008	Mount Lemmon	Mount Lemmon Survey	·	1.1 km	MPC · JPL
665046	2008 WA_{128}	—	October 3, 2003	Kitt Peak	Spacewatch	·	1.9 km	MPC · JPL
665047	2008 WE_{133}	—	October 10, 2008	Catalina	CSS	JUN	790 m	MPC · JPL
665048	2008 WE_{137}	—	October 10, 2002	Anderson Mesa	LONEOS	·	3.4 km	MPC · JPL
665049	2008 WY_{144}	—	June 11, 2011	Mount Lemmon	Mount Lemmon Survey	·	650 m	MPC · JPL
665050	2008 WB_{145}	—	November 24, 2008	Mount Lemmon	Mount Lemmon Survey	·	1.2 km	MPC · JPL
665051	2008 WN_{145}	—	October 26, 2008	Mount Lemmon	Mount Lemmon Survey	V	550 m	MPC · JPL
665052	2008 WG_{149}	—	September 9, 2015	Haleakala	Pan-STARRS 1	·	630 m	MPC · JPL
665053	2008 WA_{153}	—	October 30, 2008	Mount Lemmon	Mount Lemmon Survey	DOR	1.8 km	MPC · JPL
665054	2008 WJ_{156}	—	November 19, 2008	Kitt Peak	Spacewatch	AGN	940 m	MPC · JPL
665055	2008 WJ_{159}	—	November 30, 2008	Kitt Peak	Spacewatch	·	1.5 km	MPC · JPL
665056	2008 WT_{161}	—	November 24, 2008	Kitt Peak	Spacewatch	·	1.6 km	MPC · JPL
665057	2008 WN_{163}	—	October 1, 2008	Catalina	CSS	·	1.3 km	MPC · JPL
665058	2008 XJ_{1}	—	December 2, 2008	Sandlot	G. Hug	·	1.8 km	MPC · JPL
665059	2008 XG_{4}	—	December 3, 2008	Socorro	LINEAR	HNS	1.4 km	MPC · JPL
665060	2008 XD_{8}	—	November 7, 2008	Mount Lemmon	Mount Lemmon Survey	·	2.0 km	MPC · JPL
665061	2008 XX_{9}	—	December 2, 2008	Catalina	CSS	·	1.3 km	MPC · JPL
665062	2008 XB_{13}	—	November 3, 2008	Mount Lemmon	Mount Lemmon Survey	·	760 m	MPC · JPL
665063	2008 XV_{17}	—	December 1, 2008	Kitt Peak	Spacewatch	·	800 m	MPC · JPL
665064	2008 XO_{18}	—	December 1, 2008	Kitt Peak	Spacewatch	·	1.5 km	MPC · JPL
665065	2008 XT_{18}	—	September 11, 2007	Mount Lemmon	Mount Lemmon Survey	·	1.8 km	MPC · JPL
665066	2008 XK_{20}	—	December 1, 2008	Kitt Peak	Spacewatch	SYL	4.4 km	MPC · JPL
665067	2008 XX_{20}	—	December 1, 2008	Kitt Peak	Spacewatch	·	910 m	MPC · JPL
665068	2008 XZ_{23}	—	February 14, 2005	Catalina	CSS	·	1.8 km	MPC · JPL
665069	2008 XF_{25}	—	February 25, 2006	Mount Lemmon	Mount Lemmon Survey	·	1.4 km	MPC · JPL
665070	2008 XA_{27}	—	August 22, 2003	Palomar	NEAT	·	1.6 km	MPC · JPL
665071	2008 XA_{32}	—	November 19, 2008	Kitt Peak	Spacewatch	·	920 m	MPC · JPL
665072	2008 XH_{38}	—	November 24, 2008	Kitt Peak	Spacewatch	·	2.8 km	MPC · JPL
665073	2008 XJ_{41}	—	December 2, 2008	Mount Lemmon	Mount Lemmon Survey	H	450 m	MPC · JPL
665074	2008 XF_{42}	—	March 24, 2006	Kitt Peak	Spacewatch	·	660 m	MPC · JPL
665075	2008 XB_{45}	—	February 1, 2005	Kitt Peak	Spacewatch	·	1.7 km	MPC · JPL
665076	2008 XU_{45}	—	August 23, 2003	Cerro Tololo	Deep Ecliptic Survey	·	1.4 km	MPC · JPL
665077	2008 XN_{51}	—	November 8, 2008	Mount Lemmon	Mount Lemmon Survey	·	1.9 km	MPC · JPL
665078	2008 XS_{54}	—	December 4, 2008	Kitt Peak	Spacewatch	HOF	2.2 km	MPC · JPL
665079 Tym	2008 XA_{58}	Tym	January 4, 2013	Tincana	M. Kusiak, M. Żołnowski	·	1.5 km	MPC · JPL
665080	2008 XG_{58}	—	September 4, 1999	Kitt Peak	Spacewatch	·	1.1 km	MPC · JPL
665081	2008 XC_{60}	—	April 1, 2011	Mount Lemmon	Mount Lemmon Survey	·	2.8 km	MPC · JPL
665082	2008 XE_{61}	—	November 24, 2008	Kitt Peak	Spacewatch	·	1.2 km	MPC · JPL
665083	2008 YM_{16}	—	November 24, 2008	Mount Lemmon	Mount Lemmon Survey	·	930 m	MPC · JPL
665084	2008 YU_{18}	—	December 7, 2008	Mount Lemmon	Mount Lemmon Survey	NYS	920 m	MPC · JPL
665085	2008 YG_{21}	—	December 21, 2008	Mount Lemmon	Mount Lemmon Survey	NYS	890 m	MPC · JPL
665086	2008 YM_{25}	—	November 22, 2008	Kitt Peak	Spacewatch	·	940 m	MPC · JPL
665087	2008 YX_{25}	—	December 27, 2008	Piszkéstető	K. Sárneczky	·	800 m	MPC · JPL
665088	2008 YJ_{26}	—	December 23, 2008	Dauban	C. Rinner, Kugel, F.	MRX	1.0 km	MPC · JPL
665089	2008 YN_{26}	—	December 23, 2008	Dauban	C. Rinner, Kugel, F.	·	1.4 km	MPC · JPL
665090	2008 YU_{26}	—	December 26, 2008	Wildberg	R. Apitzsch	ADE	2.4 km	MPC · JPL
665091	2008 YT_{27}	—	December 27, 2008	Weihai	University, Shandong	·	2.2 km	MPC · JPL
665092	2008 YT_{29}	—	December 22, 2008	Kitt Peak	Spacewatch	·	1.6 km	MPC · JPL
665093	2008 YS_{33}	—	January 1, 2009	Mount Lemmon	Mount Lemmon Survey	·	1.2 km	MPC · JPL
665094	2008 YW_{43}	—	November 18, 2008	Kitt Peak	Spacewatch	NYS	850 m	MPC · JPL
665095	2008 YB_{45}	—	December 29, 2008	Mount Lemmon	Mount Lemmon Survey	·	1.2 km	MPC · JPL
665096	2008 YH_{45}	—	December 29, 2008	Mount Lemmon	Mount Lemmon Survey	·	1.4 km	MPC · JPL
665097	2008 YX_{54}	—	December 29, 2008	Mount Lemmon	Mount Lemmon Survey	·	1.1 km	MPC · JPL
665098	2008 YH_{55}	—	December 29, 2008	Mount Lemmon	Mount Lemmon Survey	·	890 m	MPC · JPL
665099	2008 YB_{61}	—	December 30, 2008	Mount Lemmon	Mount Lemmon Survey	·	1.6 km	MPC · JPL
665100	2008 YM_{67}	—	December 30, 2008	Mount Lemmon	Mount Lemmon Survey	CLA	1.2 km	MPC · JPL

== 665101–665200 ==
back to top

Designation			Discovery			Properties		Ref
Permanent	Provisional	Named after	Date	Site	Discoverer(s)	Category	Diam.	Ref
665101	2008 YR_{67}	—	July 24, 2007	Lulin	LUSS	(5)	1.3 km	MPC · JPL
665102	2008 YD_{69}	—	April 11, 2005	Mount Lemmon	Mount Lemmon Survey	EOS	2.3 km	MPC · JPL
665103	2008 YP_{73}	—	October 9, 2004	Kitt Peak	Spacewatch	NYS	770 m	MPC · JPL
665104	2008 YE_{75}	—	December 30, 2008	Mount Lemmon	Mount Lemmon Survey	V	580 m	MPC · JPL
665105	2008 YS_{76}	—	December 30, 2008	Mount Lemmon	Mount Lemmon Survey	·	1.8 km	MPC · JPL
665106	2008 YA_{78}	—	December 30, 2008	Mount Lemmon	Mount Lemmon Survey	V	590 m	MPC · JPL
665107	2008 YZ_{81}	—	December 31, 2008	Kitt Peak	Spacewatch	·	1.1 km	MPC · JPL
665108	2008 YU_{86}	—	September 18, 2003	Kitt Peak	Spacewatch	·	1.5 km	MPC · JPL
665109	2008 YR_{98}	—	March 12, 2005	Kitt Peak	Deep Ecliptic Survey	KOR	1.2 km	MPC · JPL
665110	2008 YE_{103}	—	December 21, 2008	Mount Lemmon	Mount Lemmon Survey	·	950 m	MPC · JPL
665111	2008 YK_{111}	—	December 4, 2008	Kitt Peak	Spacewatch	·	1.8 km	MPC · JPL
665112	2008 YZ_{112}	—	October 7, 2007	Mount Lemmon	Mount Lemmon Survey	KOR	1.1 km	MPC · JPL
665113	2008 YK_{113}	—	October 20, 2007	Mount Lemmon	Mount Lemmon Survey	·	2.6 km	MPC · JPL
665114	2008 YJ_{114}	—	November 20, 2008	Mount Lemmon	Mount Lemmon Survey	·	1.7 km	MPC · JPL
665115	2008 YT_{119}	—	October 8, 2007	Catalina	CSS	·	1.9 km	MPC · JPL
665116	2008 YA_{123}	—	September 19, 2003	Palomar	NEAT	EUN	1.2 km	MPC · JPL
665117	2008 YX_{125}	—	December 21, 2008	Kitt Peak	Spacewatch	ERI	1.1 km	MPC · JPL
665118	2008 YL_{127}	—	December 22, 2008	Kitt Peak	Spacewatch	·	1.6 km	MPC · JPL
665119	2008 YO_{129}	—	December 31, 2008	Kitt Peak	Spacewatch	·	1.7 km	MPC · JPL
665120	2008 YY_{129}	—	September 13, 2007	Mount Lemmon	Mount Lemmon Survey	KOR	1.0 km	MPC · JPL
665121	2008 YJ_{131}	—	December 1, 2008	Mount Lemmon	Mount Lemmon Survey	V	630 m	MPC · JPL
665122	2008 YC_{136}	—	December 22, 2008	Kitt Peak	Spacewatch	AGN	1.1 km	MPC · JPL
665123	2008 YX_{136}	—	October 1, 2008	Mount Lemmon	Mount Lemmon Survey	·	1.2 km	MPC · JPL
665124	2008 YA_{139}	—	December 30, 2008	Mount Lemmon	Mount Lemmon Survey	NYS	760 m	MPC · JPL
665125	2008 YE_{153}	—	December 21, 2008	La Sagra	OAM	·	2.4 km	MPC · JPL
665126	2008 YW_{167}	—	December 29, 2008	Catalina	CSS	·	1.9 km	MPC · JPL
665127	2008 YV_{173}	—	September 12, 2004	Kitt Peak	Spacewatch	·	620 m	MPC · JPL
665128	2008 YH_{175}	—	December 21, 2008	Kitt Peak	Spacewatch	·	1.6 km	MPC · JPL
665129	2008 YV_{175}	—	September 14, 2007	Mount Lemmon	Mount Lemmon Survey	KOR	1.2 km	MPC · JPL
665130	2008 YA_{176}	—	December 30, 2008	Mount Lemmon	Mount Lemmon Survey	·	2.0 km	MPC · JPL
665131	2008 YW_{176}	—	September 21, 2012	Mount Lemmon	Mount Lemmon Survey	·	1.5 km	MPC · JPL
665132	2008 YD_{177}	—	December 31, 2008	Kitt Peak	Spacewatch	NYS	790 m	MPC · JPL
665133	2008 YJ_{178}	—	December 22, 2008	Kitt Peak	Spacewatch	·	790 m	MPC · JPL
665134	2008 YT_{179}	—	October 20, 2012	Haleakala	Pan-STARRS 1	·	2.2 km	MPC · JPL
665135	2008 YB_{181}	—	December 31, 2008	Mount Lemmon	Mount Lemmon Survey	·	1.3 km	MPC · JPL
665136	2008 YT_{181}	—	October 31, 2013	Kitt Peak	Spacewatch	·	2.4 km	MPC · JPL
665137	2008 YR_{182}	—	April 13, 2016	Haleakala	Pan-STARRS 1	EOS	1.9 km	MPC · JPL
665138	2008 YY_{189}	—	December 22, 2008	Mount Lemmon	Mount Lemmon Survey	NYS	910 m	MPC · JPL
665139	2008 YS_{193}	—	December 30, 2008	Mount Lemmon	Mount Lemmon Survey	AGN	1.1 km	MPC · JPL
665140	2008 YE_{194}	—	December 20, 2008	Mount Lemmon	Mount Lemmon Survey	·	1.6 km	MPC · JPL
665141	2009 AJ_{2}	—	December 22, 2008	Mount Lemmon	Mount Lemmon Survey	EUN	1.4 km	MPC · JPL
665142	2009 AQ_{3}	—	January 1, 2009	Mount Lemmon	Mount Lemmon Survey	·	1.6 km	MPC · JPL
665143	2009 AM_{5}	—	January 1, 2009	Kitt Peak	Spacewatch	·	700 m	MPC · JPL
665144	2009 AN_{6}	—	January 1, 2009	Kitt Peak	Spacewatch	NYS	850 m	MPC · JPL
665145	2009 AM_{8}	—	January 1, 2009	Kitt Peak	Spacewatch	·	1.8 km	MPC · JPL
665146	2009 AW_{8}	—	January 2, 2009	Kitt Peak	Spacewatch	·	1.7 km	MPC · JPL
665147	2009 AE_{11}	—	December 22, 2008	Kitt Peak	Spacewatch	·	1.4 km	MPC · JPL
665148	2009 AJ_{12}	—	January 2, 2009	Mount Lemmon	Mount Lemmon Survey	·	1.1 km	MPC · JPL
665149	2009 AN_{14}	—	December 20, 2008	Lulin	LUSS	·	2.4 km	MPC · JPL
665150	2009 AB_{16}	—	December 4, 2008	Mount Lemmon	Mount Lemmon Survey	H	540 m	MPC · JPL
665151	2009 AH_{16}	—	January 15, 2009	Socorro	LINEAR	APO +1km	970 m	MPC · JPL
665152	2009 AS_{16}	—	December 30, 2008	Kitt Peak	Spacewatch	·	1.0 km	MPC · JPL
665153	2009 AQ_{17}	—	January 2, 2009	Kitt Peak	Spacewatch	·	3.4 km	MPC · JPL
665154	2009 AX_{17}	—	November 24, 2008	Mount Lemmon	Mount Lemmon Survey	·	790 m	MPC · JPL
665155	2009 AC_{18}	—	January 2, 2009	Kitt Peak	Spacewatch	·	1.7 km	MPC · JPL
665156	2009 AJ_{19}	—	January 2, 2009	Mount Lemmon	Mount Lemmon Survey	·	1.4 km	MPC · JPL
665157	2009 AF_{29}	—	January 15, 2009	Kitt Peak	Spacewatch	·	2.2 km	MPC · JPL
665158	2009 AR_{34}	—	January 15, 2009	Kitt Peak	Spacewatch	·	1.9 km	MPC · JPL
665159	2009 AS_{38}	—	December 5, 2008	Mount Lemmon	Mount Lemmon Survey	·	1.5 km	MPC · JPL
665160	2009 AV_{38}	—	January 15, 2009	Kitt Peak	Spacewatch	·	850 m	MPC · JPL
665161	2009 AW_{43}	—	January 2, 2009	Kitt Peak	Spacewatch	·	1.1 km	MPC · JPL
665162	2009 AK_{44}	—	January 3, 2009	Kitt Peak	Spacewatch	MAS	500 m	MPC · JPL
665163	2009 AY_{48}	—	January 7, 2009	Kitt Peak	Spacewatch	·	1.0 km	MPC · JPL
665164	2009 AW_{52}	—	January 2, 2009	Kitt Peak	Spacewatch	·	1.7 km	MPC · JPL
665165	2009 AB_{53}	—	January 1, 2009	Kitt Peak	Spacewatch	·	2.5 km	MPC · JPL
665166	2009 AC_{53}	—	August 25, 2012	Haleakala	Pan-STARRS 1	·	1.4 km	MPC · JPL
665167	2009 AO_{53}	—	December 11, 2013	Mount Lemmon	Mount Lemmon Survey	·	1.9 km	MPC · JPL
665168	2009 AP_{53}	—	March 3, 2013	Mount Lemmon	Mount Lemmon Survey	MAS	500 m	MPC · JPL
665169	2009 AT_{53}	—	January 1, 2009	XuYi	PMO NEO Survey Program	·	1.6 km	MPC · JPL
665170	2009 AE_{57}	—	July 10, 2018	Haleakala	Pan-STARRS 1	V	480 m	MPC · JPL
665171	2009 AB_{58}	—	January 3, 2009	Mount Lemmon	Mount Lemmon Survey	·	960 m	MPC · JPL
665172	2009 AR_{58}	—	January 2, 2009	Mount Lemmon	Mount Lemmon Survey	·	1.3 km	MPC · JPL
665173	2009 AS_{58}	—	August 21, 2015	Haleakala	Pan-STARRS 1	·	900 m	MPC · JPL
665174	2009 AN_{59}	—	January 7, 2009	Kitt Peak	Spacewatch	·	1.2 km	MPC · JPL
665175	2009 AU_{60}	—	January 2, 2009	Mount Lemmon	Mount Lemmon Survey	(5)	1.3 km	MPC · JPL
665176	2009 AV_{60}	—	January 2, 2009	Mount Lemmon	Mount Lemmon Survey	·	1.4 km	MPC · JPL
665177	2009 AK_{64}	—	January 2, 2009	Kitt Peak	Spacewatch	KOR	1.0 km	MPC · JPL
665178	2009 AS_{64}	—	January 2, 2009	Kitt Peak	Spacewatch	·	1.8 km	MPC · JPL
665179	2009 AL_{65}	—	January 1, 2009	Kitt Peak	Spacewatch	·	1.1 km	MPC · JPL
665180	2009 BO	—	January 16, 2009	Kitt Peak	Spacewatch	·	1.7 km	MPC · JPL
665181	2009 BU_{8}	—	January 16, 2009	Mount Lemmon	Mount Lemmon Survey	·	1.4 km	MPC · JPL
665182	2009 BY_{18}	—	December 4, 2008	Mount Lemmon	Mount Lemmon Survey	·	1.5 km	MPC · JPL
665183	2009 BH_{20}	—	January 2, 2009	Mount Lemmon	Mount Lemmon Survey	·	2.8 km	MPC · JPL
665184	2009 BF_{22}	—	October 2, 2003	Kitt Peak	Spacewatch	·	1.4 km	MPC · JPL
665185	2009 BV_{25}	—	January 16, 2009	Kitt Peak	Spacewatch	·	730 m	MPC · JPL
665186	2009 BF_{30}	—	October 9, 2007	Mount Lemmon	Mount Lemmon Survey	KOR	1.1 km	MPC · JPL
665187	2009 BU_{34}	—	January 16, 2009	Kitt Peak	Spacewatch	·	790 m	MPC · JPL
665188	2009 BR_{43}	—	January 16, 2009	Kitt Peak	Spacewatch	·	890 m	MPC · JPL
665189	2009 BK_{46}	—	January 16, 2009	Kitt Peak	Spacewatch	·	1.2 km	MPC · JPL
665190	2009 BE_{49}	—	January 16, 2009	Mount Lemmon	Mount Lemmon Survey	·	870 m	MPC · JPL
665191	2009 BB_{59}	—	June 28, 2001	Palomar	NEAT	T_{j} (2.99)	4.3 km	MPC · JPL
665192	2009 BD_{59}	—	January 16, 2009	Mount Lemmon	Mount Lemmon Survey	·	2.1 km	MPC · JPL
665193	2009 BM_{59}	—	February 27, 2006	Kitt Peak	Spacewatch	·	1.1 km	MPC · JPL
665194	2009 BQ_{75}	—	April 16, 2004	Apache Point	SDSS Collaboration	H	600 m	MPC · JPL
665195	2009 BJ_{79}	—	January 2, 2009	Catalina	CSS	·	2.3 km	MPC · JPL
665196	2009 BW_{80}	—	September 6, 2007	Siding Spring	SSS	·	1.5 km	MPC · JPL
665197	2009 BP_{83}	—	January 24, 2009	Cerro Burek	Burek, Cerro	·	930 m	MPC · JPL
665198	2009 BM_{85}	—	October 7, 2004	Kitt Peak	Spacewatch	NYS	820 m	MPC · JPL
665199	2009 BK_{90}	—	January 15, 2009	Kitt Peak	Spacewatch	(5)	1.3 km	MPC · JPL
665200	2009 BS_{92}	—	January 25, 2009	Kitt Peak	Spacewatch	·	1.6 km	MPC · JPL

== 665201–665300 ==
back to top

Designation			Discovery			Properties		Ref
Permanent	Provisional	Named after	Date	Site	Discoverer(s)	Category	Diam.	Ref
665201	2009 BM_{96}	—	December 31, 2008	Kitt Peak	Spacewatch	·	1 km	MPC · JPL
665202	2009 BO_{97}	—	January 25, 2009	Catalina	CSS	·	2.1 km	MPC · JPL
665203	2009 BU_{97}	—	October 31, 2008	Mount Lemmon	Mount Lemmon Survey	·	970 m	MPC · JPL
665204	2009 BN_{100}	—	October 8, 2007	Catalina	CSS	·	1.7 km	MPC · JPL
665205	2009 BZ_{100}	—	November 4, 2007	Mount Lemmon	Mount Lemmon Survey	·	1.4 km	MPC · JPL
665206	2009 BG_{101}	—	January 29, 2009	Kitt Peak	Spacewatch	H	490 m	MPC · JPL
665207	2009 BU_{101}	—	January 29, 2009	Mount Lemmon	Mount Lemmon Survey	·	1.4 km	MPC · JPL
665208	2009 BW_{103}	—	September 12, 2007	Kitt Peak	Spacewatch	·	1.5 km	MPC · JPL
665209	2009 BE_{108}	—	January 29, 2009	Mount Lemmon	Mount Lemmon Survey	MAS	650 m	MPC · JPL
665210	2009 BL_{109}	—	October 19, 2007	Mount Lemmon	Mount Lemmon Survey	·	1.8 km	MPC · JPL
665211	2009 BB_{112}	—	October 23, 2003	Kitt Peak	Spacewatch	·	1.4 km	MPC · JPL
665212	2009 BO_{121}	—	January 31, 2009	Kitt Peak	Spacewatch	KOR	1.2 km	MPC · JPL
665213	2009 BT_{121}	—	December 2, 2004	Catalina	CSS	·	850 m	MPC · JPL
665214	2009 BE_{123}	—	September 9, 2007	Kitt Peak	Spacewatch	·	3.0 km	MPC · JPL
665215	2009 BC_{128}	—	January 29, 2009	Mount Lemmon	Mount Lemmon Survey	·	920 m	MPC · JPL
665216	2009 BY_{128}	—	January 29, 2009	Mount Lemmon	Mount Lemmon Survey	·	970 m	MPC · JPL
665217	2009 BF_{129}	—	January 17, 2009	Kitt Peak	Spacewatch	NYS	880 m	MPC · JPL
665218	2009 BR_{133}	—	January 29, 2009	Kitt Peak	Spacewatch	·	970 m	MPC · JPL
665219	2009 BV_{140}	—	September 12, 2007	Mount Lemmon	Mount Lemmon Survey	·	1.8 km	MPC · JPL
665220	2009 BK_{145}	—	January 30, 2009	Kitt Peak	Spacewatch	KOR	1.3 km	MPC · JPL
665221	2009 BH_{146}	—	January 30, 2009	Mount Lemmon	Mount Lemmon Survey	·	1.6 km	MPC · JPL
665222	2009 BU_{152}	—	January 20, 2009	Kitt Peak	Spacewatch	·	870 m	MPC · JPL
665223	2009 BT_{160}	—	January 1, 2009	Kitt Peak	Spacewatch	·	1.2 km	MPC · JPL
665224	2009 BU_{160}	—	February 1, 2005	Kitt Peak	Spacewatch	HNS	1.3 km	MPC · JPL
665225	2009 BD_{162}	—	January 29, 2009	Mount Lemmon	Mount Lemmon Survey	ERI	1.3 km	MPC · JPL
665226	2009 BT_{162}	—	January 31, 2009	Kitt Peak	Spacewatch	CLA	1.3 km	MPC · JPL
665227	2009 BE_{165}	—	January 31, 2009	Kitt Peak	Spacewatch	·	1.4 km	MPC · JPL
665228	2009 BJ_{165}	—	September 12, 2007	Mount Lemmon	Mount Lemmon Survey	·	1.3 km	MPC · JPL
665229	2009 BP_{168}	—	February 1, 2009	Mount Lemmon	Mount Lemmon Survey	·	1.0 km	MPC · JPL
665230	2009 BZ_{171}	—	January 17, 2009	Kitt Peak	Spacewatch	·	2.3 km	MPC · JPL
665231	2009 BW_{176}	—	January 16, 2009	Kitt Peak	Spacewatch	·	1.6 km	MPC · JPL
665232	2009 BX_{179}	—	January 20, 2009	Catalina	CSS	PHO	850 m	MPC · JPL
665233	2009 BB_{184}	—	March 13, 2002	Palomar	NEAT	PHO	990 m	MPC · JPL
665234	2009 BZ_{186}	—	January 25, 2009	Kitt Peak	Spacewatch	·	1.8 km	MPC · JPL
665235	2009 BO_{189}	—	April 2, 2006	Mount Lemmon	Mount Lemmon Survey	·	660 m	MPC · JPL
665236	2009 BT_{192}	—	January 25, 2009	Kitt Peak	Spacewatch	·	1.0 km	MPC · JPL
665237	2009 BJ_{193}	—	January 31, 2009	Mount Lemmon	Mount Lemmon Survey	·	2.1 km	MPC · JPL
665238	2009 BP_{194}	—	October 16, 2012	Mount Lemmon	Mount Lemmon Survey	·	1.7 km	MPC · JPL
665239	2009 BQ_{195}	—	January 2, 2014	Kitt Peak	Spacewatch	·	1.7 km	MPC · JPL
665240	2009 BU_{195}	—	January 29, 2009	Mount Lemmon	Mount Lemmon Survey	·	1.2 km	MPC · JPL
665241	2009 BU_{196}	—	January 25, 2014	Haleakala	Pan-STARRS 1	·	1.4 km	MPC · JPL
665242	2009 BP_{197}	—	January 26, 2009	Mount Lemmon	Mount Lemmon Survey	NYS	830 m	MPC · JPL
665243	2009 BP_{199}	—	January 27, 2014	Mayhill-ISON	L. Elenin	·	2.0 km	MPC · JPL
665244	2009 BG_{200}	—	January 31, 2009	Mount Lemmon	Mount Lemmon Survey	·	2.1 km	MPC · JPL
665245	2009 BP_{200}	—	February 18, 2015	Haleakala	Pan-STARRS 1	·	2.5 km	MPC · JPL
665246	2009 BD_{202}	—	August 29, 2011	Siding Spring	SSS	·	1.2 km	MPC · JPL
665247	2009 BX_{205}	—	January 31, 2009	Mount Lemmon	Mount Lemmon Survey	·	1.0 km	MPC · JPL
665248	2009 BY_{208}	—	January 31, 2009	Kitt Peak	Spacewatch	·	1.4 km	MPC · JPL
665249	2009 BU_{211}	—	October 10, 2007	Kitt Peak	Spacewatch	KOR	1.0 km	MPC · JPL
665250	2009 CA_{2}	—	February 3, 2009	Catalina	CSS	APO	630 m	MPC · JPL
665251	2009 CT_{15}	—	February 3, 2009	Mount Lemmon	Mount Lemmon Survey	·	910 m	MPC · JPL
665252	2009 CK_{17}	—	February 3, 2009	Mount Lemmon	Mount Lemmon Survey	·	1.6 km	MPC · JPL
665253	2009 CW_{17}	—	February 3, 2009	Mount Lemmon	Mount Lemmon Survey	·	1.7 km	MPC · JPL
665254	2009 CR_{21}	—	January 18, 2009	Mount Lemmon	Mount Lemmon Survey	·	1.0 km	MPC · JPL
665255	2009 CP_{27}	—	October 10, 2002	Kitt Peak	Spacewatch	·	1.8 km	MPC · JPL
665256	2009 CO_{34}	—	February 2, 2009	Mount Lemmon	Mount Lemmon Survey	·	1.5 km	MPC · JPL
665257	2009 CX_{34}	—	October 29, 2008	Kitt Peak	Spacewatch	·	1.6 km	MPC · JPL
665258	2009 CU_{43}	—	February 14, 2009	Mount Lemmon	Mount Lemmon Survey	AGN	1.3 km	MPC · JPL
665259	2009 CH_{58}	—	February 3, 2009	Kitt Peak	Spacewatch	NYS	830 m	MPC · JPL
665260	2009 CG_{60}	—	February 1, 2009	Kitt Peak	Spacewatch	·	1.2 km	MPC · JPL
665261	2009 CT_{66}	—	May 7, 2010	Mount Lemmon	Mount Lemmon Survey	·	1.7 km	MPC · JPL
665262	2009 CA_{67}	—	February 5, 2009	Kitt Peak	Spacewatch	MAS	610 m	MPC · JPL
665263	2009 CC_{67}	—	October 10, 2007	Kitt Peak	Spacewatch	·	1.2 km	MPC · JPL
665264	2009 CQ_{67}	—	January 18, 2009	Kitt Peak	Spacewatch	·	2.3 km	MPC · JPL
665265	2009 CT_{67}	—	February 4, 2009	Mount Lemmon	Mount Lemmon Survey	·	2.6 km	MPC · JPL
665266	2009 CV_{67}	—	November 16, 2014	Mount Lemmon	Mount Lemmon Survey	·	670 m	MPC · JPL
665267	2009 CY_{67}	—	February 1, 2009	Mount Lemmon	Mount Lemmon Survey	·	1.9 km	MPC · JPL
665268	2009 CZ_{67}	—	February 1, 2009	Kitt Peak	Spacewatch	EOS	1.5 km	MPC · JPL
665269	2009 CL_{68}	—	October 6, 2012	Haleakala	Pan-STARRS 1	·	1.7 km	MPC · JPL
665270	2009 CR_{68}	—	May 2, 2001	Palomar	NEAT	·	1.6 km	MPC · JPL
665271	2009 CT_{69}	—	October 28, 2017	Mount Lemmon	Mount Lemmon Survey	EOS	1.4 km	MPC · JPL
665272	2009 CZ_{69}	—	November 12, 2012	Mount Lemmon	Mount Lemmon Survey	·	1.7 km	MPC · JPL
665273	2009 CK_{71}	—	January 3, 2017	Haleakala	Pan-STARRS 1	MAR	970 m	MPC · JPL
665274	2009 CN_{73}	—	March 31, 2013	Mount Lemmon	Mount Lemmon Survey	·	970 m	MPC · JPL
665275	2009 CJ_{74}	—	August 16, 2017	Haleakala	Pan-STARRS 1	VER	2.3 km	MPC · JPL
665276	2009 CM_{76}	—	February 4, 2009	Kitt Peak	Spacewatch	·	900 m	MPC · JPL
665277	2009 DE_{6}	—	January 17, 2009	Kitt Peak	Spacewatch	·	2.0 km	MPC · JPL
665278	2009 DK_{9}	—	February 2, 2009	Catalina	CSS	H	480 m	MPC · JPL
665279	2009 DS_{22}	—	January 1, 2009	Mount Lemmon	Mount Lemmon Survey	·	2.1 km	MPC · JPL
665280	2009 DN_{27}	—	August 10, 2007	Kitt Peak	Spacewatch	·	840 m	MPC · JPL
665281	2009 DV_{29}	—	February 23, 2009	Calar Alto	F. Hormuth	KOR	1.3 km	MPC · JPL
665282	2009 DL_{30}	—	February 23, 2009	Calar Alto	F. Hormuth	·	1.0 km	MPC · JPL
665283	2009 DD_{31}	—	January 25, 2009	Kitt Peak	Spacewatch	MAS	520 m	MPC · JPL
665284	2009 DG_{36}	—	February 22, 2009	Kitt Peak	Spacewatch	·	1.7 km	MPC · JPL
665285	2009 DF_{37}	—	January 25, 2009	Kitt Peak	Spacewatch	·	2.2 km	MPC · JPL
665286	2009 DZ_{37}	—	February 23, 2009	Calar Alto	F. Hormuth	EOS	1.3 km	MPC · JPL
665287	2009 DL_{40}	—	February 24, 2009	San Marcello	San Marcello	BRA	1.4 km	MPC · JPL
665288	2009 DW_{66}	—	February 24, 2009	Mount Lemmon	Mount Lemmon Survey	EOS	1.5 km	MPC · JPL
665289	2009 DG_{68}	—	December 30, 2008	Mount Lemmon	Mount Lemmon Survey	·	1.7 km	MPC · JPL
665290	2009 DN_{74}	—	February 26, 2009	Catalina	CSS	PHO	720 m	MPC · JPL
665291	2009 DZ_{74}	—	February 16, 2009	Catalina	CSS	·	2.8 km	MPC · JPL
665292	2009 DQ_{79}	—	February 21, 2009	Kitt Peak	Spacewatch	·	2.5 km	MPC · JPL
665293	2009 DG_{84}	—	February 26, 2009	Kitt Peak	Spacewatch	NYS	920 m	MPC · JPL
665294	2009 DK_{84}	—	February 26, 2009	Kitt Peak	Spacewatch	·	1.3 km	MPC · JPL
665295	2009 DX_{85}	—	January 30, 2009	Mount Lemmon	Mount Lemmon Survey	·	750 m	MPC · JPL
665296	2009 DE_{86}	—	January 31, 2009	Mount Lemmon	Mount Lemmon Survey	·	2.9 km	MPC · JPL
665297	2009 DH_{86}	—	December 19, 2004	Mount Lemmon	Mount Lemmon Survey	·	840 m	MPC · JPL
665298	2009 DV_{88}	—	February 3, 2009	Mount Lemmon	Mount Lemmon Survey	EOS	1.6 km	MPC · JPL
665299	2009 DN_{94}	—	February 28, 2009	Mount Lemmon	Mount Lemmon Survey	·	790 m	MPC · JPL
665300	2009 DX_{94}	—	February 28, 2009	Kitt Peak	Spacewatch	AGN	1.3 km	MPC · JPL

== 665301–665400 ==
back to top

Designation			Discovery			Properties		Ref
Permanent	Provisional	Named after	Date	Site	Discoverer(s)	Category	Diam.	Ref
665301	2009 DS_{95}	—	January 30, 2009	Mount Lemmon	Mount Lemmon Survey	·	980 m	MPC · JPL
665302	2009 DG_{100}	—	February 26, 2009	Kitt Peak	Spacewatch	EOS	1.4 km	MPC · JPL
665303	2009 DY_{100}	—	February 26, 2009	Kitt Peak	Spacewatch	·	1.9 km	MPC · JPL
665304	2009 DP_{105}	—	February 26, 2009	Kitt Peak	Spacewatch	·	830 m	MPC · JPL
665305	2009 DQ_{105}	—	February 26, 2009	Kitt Peak	Spacewatch	NYS	1.0 km	MPC · JPL
665306	2009 DV_{106}	—	February 19, 2009	Kitt Peak	Spacewatch	·	1.2 km	MPC · JPL
665307	2009 DL_{108}	—	February 24, 2009	Mount Lemmon	Mount Lemmon Survey	·	1.1 km	MPC · JPL
665308	2009 DQ_{109}	—	February 19, 2009	Catalina	CSS	·	1.2 km	MPC · JPL
665309	2009 DE_{112}	—	February 1, 2009	Kitt Peak	Spacewatch	·	1.6 km	MPC · JPL
665310	2009 DA_{113}	—	February 27, 2009	Kitt Peak	Spacewatch	AST	1.6 km	MPC · JPL
665311	2009 DS_{113}	—	February 4, 2009	Kitt Peak	Spacewatch	MAS	620 m	MPC · JPL
665312	2009 DU_{123}	—	February 1, 2009	Kitt Peak	Spacewatch	MAS	600 m	MPC · JPL
665313	2009 DH_{127}	—	September 28, 2006	Catalina	CSS	JUN	1.1 km	MPC · JPL
665314	2009 DY_{135}	—	October 21, 2007	Mount Lemmon	Mount Lemmon Survey	V	780 m	MPC · JPL
665315	2009 DK_{140}	—	February 20, 2009	Kitt Peak	Spacewatch	·	1.6 km	MPC · JPL
665316	2009 DS_{146}	—	March 20, 2016	Haleakala	Pan-STARRS 1	PHO	840 m	MPC · JPL
665317	2009 DH_{147}	—	February 24, 2009	La Sagra	OAM	HNS	1.2 km	MPC · JPL
665318	2009 DB_{148}	—	September 2, 2010	Mount Lemmon	Mount Lemmon Survey	·	980 m	MPC · JPL
665319	2009 DL_{148}	—	July 4, 2014	Haleakala	Pan-STARRS 1	·	1.1 km	MPC · JPL
665320	2009 DQ_{150}	—	October 19, 2012	Mount Lemmon	Mount Lemmon Survey	EOS	1.3 km	MPC · JPL
665321	2009 DF_{151}	—	September 21, 2011	Mount Lemmon	Mount Lemmon Survey	KOR	1.1 km	MPC · JPL
665322	2009 DK_{151}	—	February 27, 2009	Kitt Peak	Spacewatch	EOS	1.3 km	MPC · JPL
665323	2009 DD_{153}	—	February 26, 2009	Kitt Peak	Spacewatch	·	980 m	MPC · JPL
665324	2009 DX_{158}	—	February 27, 2009	Kitt Peak	Spacewatch	·	1.9 km	MPC · JPL
665325	2009 DQ_{159}	—	February 20, 2009	Mount Lemmon	Mount Lemmon Survey	KOR	1.3 km	MPC · JPL
665326	2009 EF_{3}	—	March 15, 2009	Kitt Peak	Spacewatch	APO	170 m	MPC · JPL
665327	2009 EC_{6}	—	March 1, 2009	Kitt Peak	Spacewatch	·	1.9 km	MPC · JPL
665328	2009 ES_{9}	—	February 3, 2009	Kitt Peak	Spacewatch	·	1.5 km	MPC · JPL
665329	2009 EA_{11}	—	March 2, 2009	Kitt Peak	Spacewatch	·	1.7 km	MPC · JPL
665330	2009 EP_{12}	—	March 1, 2009	Mount Lemmon	Mount Lemmon Survey	·	1.4 km	MPC · JPL
665331	2009 EM_{19}	—	March 15, 2009	Mount Lemmon	Mount Lemmon Survey	AGN	1.3 km	MPC · JPL
665332	2009 EZ_{32}	—	March 24, 2014	Haleakala	Pan-STARRS 1	·	1.8 km	MPC · JPL
665333	2009 EE_{33}	—	April 25, 2015	Haleakala	Pan-STARRS 1	·	1.6 km	MPC · JPL
665334	2009 EZ_{33}	—	September 2, 2014	Haleakala	Pan-STARRS 1	·	970 m	MPC · JPL
665335	2009 EE_{36}	—	September 22, 2017	Haleakala	Pan-STARRS 1	EOS	1.6 km	MPC · JPL
665336	2009 EN_{39}	—	March 3, 2009	Mount Lemmon	Mount Lemmon Survey	·	930 m	MPC · JPL
665337	2009 EN_{42}	—	March 3, 2009	Mount Lemmon	Mount Lemmon Survey	·	1.7 km	MPC · JPL
665338	2009 FS_{2}	—	February 28, 2009	Kitt Peak	Spacewatch	MAR	890 m	MPC · JPL
665339	2009 FT_{3}	—	March 19, 2009	Catalina	CSS	·	870 m	MPC · JPL
665340	2009 FE_{6}	—	January 30, 2009	Mount Lemmon	Mount Lemmon Survey	·	1.4 km	MPC · JPL
665341	2009 FP_{6}	—	November 4, 2007	Mount Lemmon	Mount Lemmon Survey	·	1.9 km	MPC · JPL
665342	2009 FV_{6}	—	March 1, 2009	Kitt Peak	Spacewatch	·	980 m	MPC · JPL
665343	2009 FR_{17}	—	February 21, 2009	Kitt Peak	Spacewatch	NYS	1.2 km	MPC · JPL
665344	2009 FZ_{17}	—	March 18, 2009	La Sagra	OAM	·	1.2 km	MPC · JPL
665345	2009 FZ_{25}	—	March 1, 2009	Kitt Peak	Spacewatch	·	850 m	MPC · JPL
665346	2009 FW_{26}	—	March 18, 2009	Kitt Peak	Spacewatch	NYS	1.1 km	MPC · JPL
665347	2009 FZ_{28}	—	October 20, 2007	Kitt Peak	Spacewatch	·	1.3 km	MPC · JPL
665348	2009 FL_{33}	—	January 25, 2009	Kitt Peak	Spacewatch	·	1.1 km	MPC · JPL
665349	2009 FW_{33}	—	January 31, 2009	Mount Lemmon	Mount Lemmon Survey	·	2.1 km	MPC · JPL
665350	2009 FV_{43}	—	March 29, 2009	Bergisch Gladbach	W. Bickel	·	1.7 km	MPC · JPL
665351	2009 FT_{46}	—	February 16, 2002	Palomar	NEAT	·	740 m	MPC · JPL
665352	2009 FH_{48}	—	September 18, 2003	Palomar	NEAT	·	680 m	MPC · JPL
665353	2009 FL_{48}	—	August 19, 2006	Kitt Peak	Spacewatch	·	2.1 km	MPC · JPL
665354	2009 FB_{60}	—	January 30, 2004	Kitt Peak	Spacewatch	·	2.0 km	MPC · JPL
665355	2009 FK_{77}	—	September 26, 2003	Apache Point	SDSS Collaboration	·	1.2 km	MPC · JPL
665356	2009 FW_{79}	—	August 18, 2006	Kitt Peak	Spacewatch	·	1.8 km	MPC · JPL
665357	2009 FN_{80}	—	January 9, 2016	Haleakala	Pan-STARRS 1	PHO	1.1 km	MPC · JPL
665358	2009 FE_{82}	—	October 27, 2012	Mount Lemmon	Mount Lemmon Survey	EOS	1.7 km	MPC · JPL
665359	2009 FG_{82}	—	February 28, 2014	Haleakala	Pan-STARRS 1	·	2.0 km	MPC · JPL
665360	2009 FJ_{82}	—	August 8, 2016	Haleakala	Pan-STARRS 1	·	2.0 km	MPC · JPL
665361	2009 FQ_{82}	—	March 16, 2009	Mount Lemmon	Mount Lemmon Survey	·	1.6 km	MPC · JPL
665362	2009 FU_{83}	—	July 30, 2017	Haleakala	Pan-STARRS 1	·	1.8 km	MPC · JPL
665363	2009 FV_{86}	—	October 18, 2012	Mount Lemmon	Mount Lemmon Survey	·	1.6 km	MPC · JPL
665364	2009 FJ_{88}	—	August 3, 2016	Haleakala	Pan-STARRS 1	EOS	1.2 km	MPC · JPL
665365	2009 FV_{88}	—	October 7, 2012	Haleakala	Pan-STARRS 1	·	1.8 km	MPC · JPL
665366	2009 FY_{88}	—	December 9, 2015	Haleakala	Pan-STARRS 1	·	1.0 km	MPC · JPL
665367	2009 FF_{89}	—	December 23, 2012	Haleakala	Pan-STARRS 1	·	1.3 km	MPC · JPL
665368	2009 FY_{93}	—	March 19, 2009	Mount Lemmon	Mount Lemmon Survey	·	1.4 km	MPC · JPL
665369	2009 GZ_{3}	—	April 6, 2009	Cerro Burek	Burek, Cerro	·	1.1 km	MPC · JPL
665370	2009 GE_{7}	—	September 23, 2011	Haleakala	Pan-STARRS 1	EOS	1.5 km	MPC · JPL
665371	2009 HD_{2}	—	March 29, 2009	Kitt Peak	Spacewatch	NYS	960 m	MPC · JPL
665372	2009 HW_{3}	—	December 4, 2007	Kitt Peak	Spacewatch	V	860 m	MPC · JPL
665373	2009 HC_{5}	—	April 17, 2009	Kitt Peak	Spacewatch	NYS	900 m	MPC · JPL
665374	2009 HY_{6}	—	December 5, 2007	Kitt Peak	Spacewatch	GEF	1.3 km	MPC · JPL
665375	2009 HC_{9}	—	June 4, 2006	Socorro	LINEAR	·	810 m	MPC · JPL
665376	2009 HF_{10}	—	March 13, 2005	Kitt Peak	Spacewatch	V	490 m	MPC · JPL
665377	2009 HM_{16}	—	October 20, 2007	Kitt Peak	Spacewatch	·	1.8 km	MPC · JPL
665378	2009 HF_{31}	—	April 19, 2009	Kitt Peak	Spacewatch	·	1.0 km	MPC · JPL
665379	2009 HP_{32}	—	March 2, 2009	Mount Lemmon	Mount Lemmon Survey	·	720 m	MPC · JPL
665380	2009 HG_{35}	—	April 20, 2009	Mount Lemmon	Mount Lemmon Survey	·	1.0 km	MPC · JPL
665381	2009 HK_{41}	—	April 20, 2009	Kitt Peak	Spacewatch	·	740 m	MPC · JPL
665382	2009 HV_{44}	—	April 22, 2009	Socorro	LINEAR	APO	600 m	MPC · JPL
665383	2009 HK_{47}	—	November 18, 2007	Kitt Peak	Spacewatch	·	1.3 km	MPC · JPL
665384	2009 HX_{55}	—	April 21, 2009	Mount Lemmon	Mount Lemmon Survey	EOS	1.5 km	MPC · JPL
665385	2009 HD_{56}	—	April 21, 2009	Mount Lemmon	Mount Lemmon Survey	·	2.1 km	MPC · JPL
665386	2009 HH_{56}	—	October 4, 2006	Mount Lemmon	Mount Lemmon Survey	·	1.9 km	MPC · JPL
665387	2009 HY_{60}	—	April 20, 2009	Kitt Peak	Spacewatch	·	2.3 km	MPC · JPL
665388	2009 HM_{67}	—	April 26, 2009	Mount Lemmon	Mount Lemmon Survey	·	1.4 km	MPC · JPL
665389	2009 HJ_{69}	—	April 22, 2009	Mount Lemmon	Mount Lemmon Survey	·	1.8 km	MPC · JPL
665390	2009 HD_{82}	—	April 24, 2009	Kitt Peak	Spacewatch	APO	160 m	MPC · JPL
665391	2009 HY_{82}	—	April 11, 2004	Palomar	NEAT	H	460 m	MPC · JPL
665392	2009 HO_{87}	—	April 30, 2009	Mount Lemmon	Mount Lemmon Survey	·	1.7 km	MPC · JPL
665393	2009 HE_{88}	—	April 29, 2008	Mount Lemmon	Mount Lemmon Survey	EUP	3.4 km	MPC · JPL
665394	2009 HH_{89}	—	April 25, 2009	Cerro Burek	Burek, Cerro	·	1.1 km	MPC · JPL
665395	2009 HN_{100}	—	July 28, 2005	Palomar	NEAT	EOS	2.3 km	MPC · JPL
665396	2009 HN_{109}	—	March 30, 2015	Haleakala	Pan-STARRS 1	·	1.7 km	MPC · JPL
665397	2009 HA_{111}	—	April 17, 2009	Kitt Peak	Spacewatch	·	1.9 km	MPC · JPL
665398	2009 HB_{111}	—	September 8, 2011	Haleakala	Pan-STARRS 1	·	3.0 km	MPC · JPL
665399	2009 HL_{111}	—	October 25, 2013	Mount Lemmon	Mount Lemmon Survey	·	810 m	MPC · JPL
665400	2009 HF_{112}	—	April 25, 2015	Haleakala	Pan-STARRS 1	EOS	1.9 km	MPC · JPL

== 665401–665500 ==
back to top

Designation			Discovery			Properties		Ref
Permanent	Provisional	Named after	Date	Site	Discoverer(s)	Category	Diam.	Ref
665401	2009 HP_{112}	—	December 13, 2015	Haleakala	Pan-STARRS 1	·	1.1 km	MPC · JPL
665402	2009 HK_{116}	—	October 11, 2010	Mount Lemmon	Mount Lemmon Survey	·	1.5 km	MPC · JPL
665403	2009 HN_{116}	—	October 26, 2016	Kitt Peak	Spacewatch	·	1.7 km	MPC · JPL
665404	2009 HQ_{117}	—	November 18, 2017	Haleakala	Pan-STARRS 1	·	1.6 km	MPC · JPL
665405	2009 HC_{118}	—	March 24, 2014	Haleakala	Pan-STARRS 1	EOS	1.5 km	MPC · JPL
665406	2009 HX_{118}	—	January 3, 2013	Mount Lemmon	Mount Lemmon Survey	·	1.9 km	MPC · JPL
665407	2009 HH_{119}	—	October 28, 2016	Haleakala	Pan-STARRS 1	·	1.9 km	MPC · JPL
665408	2009 HN_{119}	—	February 26, 2014	Mount Lemmon	Mount Lemmon Survey	THM	1.9 km	MPC · JPL
665409	2009 HW_{120}	—	April 21, 2009	Kitt Peak	Spacewatch	MAS	580 m	MPC · JPL
665410	2009 HF_{121}	—	April 30, 2009	Kitt Peak	Spacewatch	·	2.1 km	MPC · JPL
665411	2009 HO_{122}	—	April 30, 2009	Kitt Peak	Spacewatch	·	2.4 km	MPC · JPL
665412	2009 HK_{124}	—	April 27, 2009	Kitt Peak	Spacewatch	·	1.9 km	MPC · JPL
665413	2009 HF_{125}	—	April 29, 2009	Kitt Peak	Spacewatch	L5	7.1 km	MPC · JPL
665414	2009 JQ_{10}	—	October 20, 2007	Mount Lemmon	Mount Lemmon Survey	·	1.2 km	MPC · JPL
665415	2009 JV_{14}	—	April 6, 2005	Mount Lemmon	Mount Lemmon Survey	NYS	1.2 km	MPC · JPL
665416	2009 JL_{15}	—	May 1, 2009	Mount Lemmon	Mount Lemmon Survey	·	1.1 km	MPC · JPL
665417	2009 JJ_{20}	—	June 19, 2015	Haleakala	Pan-STARRS 1	·	2.6 km	MPC · JPL
665418	2009 JL_{20}	—	May 15, 2009	Kitt Peak	Spacewatch	·	1.6 km	MPC · JPL
665419	2009 JX_{20}	—	January 14, 2011	Mount Lemmon	Mount Lemmon Survey	·	1.0 km	MPC · JPL
665420	2009 JL_{23}	—	May 14, 2009	Mount Lemmon	Mount Lemmon Survey	PHO	720 m	MPC · JPL
665421	2009 KS_{5}	—	April 18, 2009	Kitt Peak	Spacewatch	L5	10 km	MPC · JPL
665422	2009 KE_{6}	—	May 1, 2009	Mount Lemmon	Mount Lemmon Survey	·	1.2 km	MPC · JPL
665423	2009 KV_{6}	—	November 26, 2005	Mount Lemmon	Mount Lemmon Survey	·	2.6 km	MPC · JPL
665424	2009 KD_{7}	—	May 25, 2009	Tiki	Teamo, N.	EOS	1.9 km	MPC · JPL
665425	2009 KK_{7}	—	October 21, 2007	Kitt Peak	Spacewatch	·	1.0 km	MPC · JPL
665426	2009 KU_{8}	—	May 27, 2009	Hibiscus	Teamo, N.	·	2.5 km	MPC · JPL
665427	2009 KB_{10}	—	May 25, 2009	Kitt Peak	Spacewatch	·	730 m	MPC · JPL
665428	2009 KO_{10}	—	May 25, 2009	Kitt Peak	Spacewatch	V	680 m	MPC · JPL
665429	2009 KT_{21}	—	May 29, 2009	Mount Lemmon	Mount Lemmon Survey	AMO	370 m	MPC · JPL
665430	2009 KC_{22}	—	May 29, 2009	Catalina	CSS	H	520 m	MPC · JPL
665431	2009 KC_{23}	—	July 31, 2005	Palomar	NEAT	·	1.9 km	MPC · JPL
665432	2009 KU_{24}	—	May 7, 2002	Kitt Peak	Spacewatch	·	720 m	MPC · JPL
665433	2009 KP_{25}	—	May 28, 2009	Mount Lemmon	Mount Lemmon Survey	·	940 m	MPC · JPL
665434	2009 KS_{25}	—	October 3, 2006	Mount Lemmon	Mount Lemmon Survey	·	920 m	MPC · JPL
665435	2009 KQ_{36}	—	November 25, 2006	Mount Lemmon	Mount Lemmon Survey	·	2.3 km	MPC · JPL
665436	2009 KM_{39}	—	November 24, 2011	Mount Lemmon	Mount Lemmon Survey	·	2.1 km	MPC · JPL
665437	2009 KD_{40}	—	April 22, 2009	Mount Lemmon	Mount Lemmon Survey	BRG	1.1 km	MPC · JPL
665438	2009 KK_{40}	—	December 18, 2015	Mount Lemmon	Mount Lemmon Survey	HNS	1.4 km	MPC · JPL
665439	2009 KG_{41}	—	May 18, 2009	Mount Lemmon	Mount Lemmon Survey	PHO	970 m	MPC · JPL
665440	2009 KC_{42}	—	June 20, 2015	Haleakala	Pan-STARRS 1	·	2.1 km	MPC · JPL
665441	2009 KA_{44}	—	May 17, 2009	Mount Lemmon	Mount Lemmon Survey	·	960 m	MPC · JPL
665442	2009 LT_{1}	—	April 28, 2009	Kitt Peak	Spacewatch	·	2.1 km	MPC · JPL
665443	2009 LK_{2}	—	June 1, 2009	Mount Lemmon	Mount Lemmon Survey	JUN	800 m	MPC · JPL
665444	2009 LR_{6}	—	June 14, 2009	Kitt Peak	Spacewatch	·	1.2 km	MPC · JPL
665445	2009 LT_{7}	—	June 4, 2014	Haleakala	Pan-STARRS 1	H	460 m	MPC · JPL
665446	2009 MF_{1}	—	June 22, 2009	Cerro Burek	Burek, Cerro	H	390 m	MPC · JPL
665447	2009 MT_{3}	—	June 19, 2009	Kitt Peak	Spacewatch	H	410 m	MPC · JPL
665448	2009 ML_{5}	—	June 21, 2009	Kitt Peak	Spacewatch	·	2.7 km	MPC · JPL
665449	2009 MH_{9}	—	June 27, 2009	Cerro Burek	Burek, Cerro	·	3.2 km	MPC · JPL
665450	2009 MN_{10}	—	May 29, 2009	Mount Lemmon	Mount Lemmon Survey	·	2.2 km	MPC · JPL
665451	2009 MY_{10}	—	June 25, 2015	Haleakala	Pan-STARRS 1	T_{j} (2.97) · EUP	3.4 km	MPC · JPL
665452	2009 MA_{11}	—	April 22, 2009	Kitt Peak	Spacewatch	·	1.1 km	MPC · JPL
665453	2009 MB_{12}	—	March 28, 2014	Mount Lemmon	Mount Lemmon Survey	·	2.5 km	MPC · JPL
665454	2009 MT_{12}	—	June 24, 2009	Mount Lemmon	Mount Lemmon Survey	·	1.5 km	MPC · JPL
665455	2009 NS	—	July 14, 2009	La Sagra	OAM	·	1.2 km	MPC · JPL
665456	2009 OB_{8}	—	June 17, 2009	Mount Lemmon	Mount Lemmon Survey	BAR	1.0 km	MPC · JPL
665457	2009 OC_{10}	—	July 29, 2009	La Sagra	OAM	·	3.9 km	MPC · JPL
665458	2009 OX_{12}	—	July 27, 2009	Kitt Peak	Spacewatch	·	3.7 km	MPC · JPL
665459	2009 OF_{13}	—	July 27, 2009	Kitt Peak	Spacewatch	·	1.8 km	MPC · JPL
665460	2009 OO_{14}	—	July 20, 2009	Cerro Burek	Burek, Cerro	H	480 m	MPC · JPL
665461	2009 OE_{17}	—	July 28, 2009	Kitt Peak	Spacewatch	·	1.3 km	MPC · JPL
665462	2009 OH_{19}	—	December 30, 2005	Kitt Peak	Spacewatch	·	2.2 km	MPC · JPL
665463	2009 OO_{19}	—	July 28, 2009	Kitt Peak	Spacewatch	·	1.4 km	MPC · JPL
665464	2009 OS_{21}	—	July 30, 2009	Bergisch Gladbach	W. Bickel	LIX	3.1 km	MPC · JPL
665465	2009 OW_{24}	—	July 20, 2009	Črni Vrh	Matičič, S.	·	2.5 km	MPC · JPL
665466	2009 OB_{27}	—	October 29, 2010	Kitt Peak	Spacewatch	·	2.5 km	MPC · JPL
665467	2009 OW_{27}	—	July 30, 2009	Kitt Peak	Spacewatch	·	820 m	MPC · JPL
665468	2009 OX_{27}	—	July 15, 2013	Haleakala	Pan-STARRS 1	·	890 m	MPC · JPL
665469	2009 OX_{29}	—	July 27, 2009	Kitt Peak	Spacewatch	·	2.3 km	MPC · JPL
665470	2009 PQ	—	April 11, 2008	Mount Lemmon	Mount Lemmon Survey	·	3.0 km	MPC · JPL
665471	2009 PZ	—	August 13, 2009	Dauban	C. Rinner, Kugel, F.	·	680 m	MPC · JPL
665472	2009 PZ_{2}	—	July 28, 2009	Catalina	CSS	·	1.8 km	MPC · JPL
665473	2009 PK_{4}	—	August 15, 2009	Catalina	CSS	·	3.2 km	MPC · JPL
665474	2009 PU_{4}	—	August 15, 2009	La Sagra	OAM	·	1.2 km	MPC · JPL
665475	2009 PH_{7}	—	August 15, 2009	Kitt Peak	Spacewatch	·	1.1 km	MPC · JPL
665476	2009 PD_{11}	—	August 16, 2009	Kitt Peak	Spacewatch	·	1.4 km	MPC · JPL
665477	2009 PR_{12}	—	August 15, 2009	Kitt Peak	Spacewatch	·	1.3 km	MPC · JPL
665478	2009 PT_{17}	—	August 15, 2009	Kitt Peak	Spacewatch	·	460 m	MPC · JPL
665479	2009 PU_{17}	—	August 15, 2009	Kitt Peak	Spacewatch	EOS	1.5 km	MPC · JPL
665480	2009 PO_{21}	—	August 12, 2009	Palomar	Palomar Transient Factory	·	2.7 km	MPC · JPL
665481	2009 PW_{21}	—	August 15, 2009	La Sagra	OAM	·	2.8 km	MPC · JPL
665482	2009 PM_{22}	—	August 10, 2009	Kitt Peak	Spacewatch	·	1.1 km	MPC · JPL
665483	2009 PT_{22}	—	August 15, 2009	Kitt Peak	Spacewatch	·	510 m	MPC · JPL
665484	2009 PY_{22}	—	January 17, 2015	Haleakala	Pan-STARRS 1	·	1.1 km	MPC · JPL
665485	2009 QG	—	August 16, 2009	Kitt Peak	Spacewatch	·	2.0 km	MPC · JPL
665486	2009 QR_{1}	—	June 24, 2009	Kitt Peak	Spacewatch	DOR	1.9 km	MPC · JPL
665487	2009 QD_{3}	—	August 16, 2009	Kitt Peak	Spacewatch	·	1.2 km	MPC · JPL
665488	2009 QL_{3}	—	August 16, 2009	Kitt Peak	Spacewatch	·	2.4 km	MPC · JPL
665489	2009 QR_{3}	—	August 16, 2009	Catalina	CSS	·	630 m	MPC · JPL
665490	2009 QR_{4}	—	October 16, 2002	Anderson Mesa	LONEOS	·	1.2 km	MPC · JPL
665491	2009 QW_{6}	—	August 18, 2009	Altschwendt	W. Ries	·	3.5 km	MPC · JPL
665492	2009 QF_{7}	—	August 16, 2009	Sierra Stars	R. Matson	·	1.1 km	MPC · JPL
665493	2009 QX_{7}	—	March 13, 2007	Kitt Peak	Spacewatch	·	2.0 km	MPC · JPL
665494	2009 QZ_{7}	—	September 17, 2006	Kitt Peak	Spacewatch	·	570 m	MPC · JPL
665495	2009 QX_{8}	—	August 20, 2009	Sandlot	G. Hug	MAS	740 m	MPC · JPL
665496	2009 QZ_{8}	—	August 20, 2009	Kitt Peak	Spacewatch	·	520 m	MPC · JPL
665497	2009 QY_{10}	—	August 22, 2009	Dauban	C. Rinner, Kugel, F.	·	2.6 km	MPC · JPL
665498	2009 QX_{21}	—	August 20, 2009	La Sagra	OAM	·	1.1 km	MPC · JPL
665499	2009 QD_{24}	—	August 16, 2009	Kitt Peak	Spacewatch	EUN	860 m	MPC · JPL
665500	2009 QM_{27}	—	August 21, 2009	La Sagra	OAM	EUP	3.3 km	MPC · JPL

== 665501–665600 ==
back to top

Designation			Discovery			Properties		Ref
Permanent	Provisional	Named after	Date	Site	Discoverer(s)	Category	Diam.	Ref
665501	2009 QA_{28}	—	August 19, 2009	Kitt Peak	Spacewatch	·	3.0 km	MPC · JPL
665502	2009 QO_{29}	—	August 23, 2009	Bergisch Gladbach	W. Bickel	·	1.6 km	MPC · JPL
665503	2009 QF_{35}	—	October 7, 2005	Mauna Kea	A. Boattini	·	3.4 km	MPC · JPL
665504	2009 QW_{35}	—	August 27, 2009	Zelenchukskaya	T. V. Krjačko, B. Satovski	·	2.7 km	MPC · JPL
665505	2009 QF_{37}	—	August 31, 2009	La Sagra	OAM	·	1.5 km	MPC · JPL
665506	2009 QK_{37}	—	August 29, 2009	Zelenchukskaya Station	T. V. Krjačko, B. Satovski	·	3.3 km	MPC · JPL
665507	2009 QF_{38}	—	August 29, 2009	Bergisch Gladbach	W. Bickel	EOS	1.8 km	MPC · JPL
665508	2009 QW_{39}	—	June 23, 2009	Mount Lemmon	Mount Lemmon Survey	·	1.6 km	MPC · JPL
665509	2009 QG_{41}	—	August 27, 2009	Kitt Peak	Spacewatch	·	590 m	MPC · JPL
665510	2009 QA_{44}	—	August 27, 2009	Kitt Peak	Spacewatch	EOS	1.4 km	MPC · JPL
665511	2009 QQ_{44}	—	December 1, 2005	Kitt Peak	Spacewatch	·	1.2 km	MPC · JPL
665512	2009 QL_{45}	—	August 28, 2009	La Sagra	OAM	·	4.3 km	MPC · JPL
665513	2009 QK_{47}	—	February 8, 2008	Mount Lemmon	Mount Lemmon Survey	·	1.6 km	MPC · JPL
665514	2009 QU_{50}	—	August 29, 2009	Kitt Peak	Spacewatch	·	2.6 km	MPC · JPL
665515	2009 QE_{51}	—	August 20, 2009	La Sagra	OAM	EUP	3.2 km	MPC · JPL
665516	2009 QG_{52}	—	August 16, 2009	Kitt Peak	Spacewatch	·	1.3 km	MPC · JPL
665517	2009 QJ_{54}	—	July 31, 2005	Palomar	NEAT	·	980 m	MPC · JPL
665518	2009 QM_{63}	—	August 19, 2009	La Sagra	OAM	·	1.1 km	MPC · JPL
665519	2009 QB_{64}	—	July 31, 2009	Kitt Peak	Spacewatch	·	1.0 km	MPC · JPL
665520	2009 QA_{65}	—	September 22, 2009	Catalina	CSS	EOS	2.1 km	MPC · JPL
665521	2009 QW_{66}	—	March 1, 2012	Mount Lemmon	Mount Lemmon Survey	·	2.1 km	MPC · JPL
665522	2009 QE_{69}	—	August 26, 2009	Catalina	CSS	·	1.1 km	MPC · JPL
665523	2009 QP_{69}	—	January 24, 2012	Haleakala	Pan-STARRS 1	·	2.4 km	MPC · JPL
665524	2009 QZ_{69}	—	June 19, 2009	Kitt Peak	Spacewatch	HNS	1.1 km	MPC · JPL
665525	2009 QK_{70}	—	August 22, 2009	La Sagra	OAM	PHO	670 m	MPC · JPL
665526	2009 QD_{73}	—	August 18, 2009	Kitt Peak	Spacewatch	·	2.5 km	MPC · JPL
665527	2009 QF_{73}	—	August 27, 2009	Kitt Peak	Spacewatch	VER	2.0 km	MPC · JPL
665528	2009 QL_{73}	—	August 18, 2009	Kitt Peak	Spacewatch	·	2.6 km	MPC · JPL
665529	2009 QB_{75}	—	August 18, 2009	Kitt Peak	Spacewatch	H	320 m	MPC · JPL
665530	2009 QZ_{78}	—	August 20, 2009	Kitt Peak	Spacewatch	·	3.0 km	MPC · JPL
665531	2009 RT	—	September 10, 2009	ESA OGS	ESA OGS	·	2.9 km	MPC · JPL
665532	2009 RN_{2}	—	August 28, 2009	Catalina	CSS	·	2.1 km	MPC · JPL
665533	2009 RO_{9}	—	September 12, 2009	Kitt Peak	Spacewatch	·	1.7 km	MPC · JPL
665534	2009 RM_{10}	—	September 12, 2009	Kitt Peak	Spacewatch	·	770 m	MPC · JPL
665535	2009 RE_{13}	—	September 12, 2009	Kitt Peak	Spacewatch	·	1.5 km	MPC · JPL
665536	2009 RZ_{13}	—	September 12, 2009	Kitt Peak	Spacewatch	·	2.0 km	MPC · JPL
665537	2009 RD_{17}	—	September 12, 2009	Kitt Peak	Spacewatch	L4	7.3 km	MPC · JPL
665538	2009 RB_{18}	—	September 12, 2009	Kitt Peak	Spacewatch	·	2.6 km	MPC · JPL
665539	2009 RB_{20}	—	September 14, 2009	Catalina	CSS	·	700 m	MPC · JPL
665540	2009 RF_{21}	—	September 15, 2009	Kitt Peak	Spacewatch	·	1.1 km	MPC · JPL
665541	2009 RB_{23}	—	September 15, 2009	Mount Lemmon	Mount Lemmon Survey	EOS	1.3 km	MPC · JPL
665542	2009 RP_{23}	—	March 15, 2007	Kitt Peak	Spacewatch	·	2.0 km	MPC · JPL
665543	2009 RO_{25}	—	September 15, 2009	Kitt Peak	Spacewatch	·	490 m	MPC · JPL
665544	2009 RR_{25}	—	September 15, 2009	Kitt Peak	Spacewatch	·	530 m	MPC · JPL
665545	2009 RL_{27}	—	September 16, 2009	Kitt Peak	Spacewatch	H	400 m	MPC · JPL
665546	2009 RD_{32}	—	September 14, 2009	Kitt Peak	Spacewatch	·	2.5 km	MPC · JPL
665547	2009 RT_{35}	—	September 14, 2009	Kitt Peak	Spacewatch	·	1.2 km	MPC · JPL
665548	2009 RJ_{36}	—	September 15, 2009	Kitt Peak	Spacewatch	TIR	2.4 km	MPC · JPL
665549	2009 RQ_{37}	—	March 11, 2008	Kitt Peak	Spacewatch	·	2.1 km	MPC · JPL
665550	2009 RO_{40}	—	September 15, 2009	Kitt Peak	Spacewatch	·	2.4 km	MPC · JPL
665551	2009 RG_{41}	—	September 15, 2009	Kitt Peak	Spacewatch	·	1.3 km	MPC · JPL
665552	2009 RK_{41}	—	September 15, 2009	Kitt Peak	Spacewatch	·	2.1 km	MPC · JPL
665553	2009 RT_{41}	—	September 15, 2009	Kitt Peak	Spacewatch	·	720 m	MPC · JPL
665554	2009 RA_{43}	—	September 15, 2009	Kitt Peak	Spacewatch	L4	6.9 km	MPC · JPL
665555	2009 RF_{43}	—	September 15, 2009	Kitt Peak	Spacewatch	·	1.5 km	MPC · JPL
665556	2009 RN_{44}	—	September 15, 2009	Kitt Peak	Spacewatch	·	560 m	MPC · JPL
665557	2009 RQ_{46}	—	March 11, 2005	Mount Lemmon	Mount Lemmon Survey	·	610 m	MPC · JPL
665558	2009 RS_{46}	—	September 15, 2009	Kitt Peak	Spacewatch	·	1.2 km	MPC · JPL
665559	2009 RN_{52}	—	September 15, 2009	Kitt Peak	Spacewatch	·	1.4 km	MPC · JPL
665560	2009 RL_{55}	—	September 15, 2009	Kitt Peak	Spacewatch	EUN	830 m	MPC · JPL
665561	2009 RU_{56}	—	September 15, 2009	Kitt Peak	Spacewatch	·	2.7 km	MPC · JPL
665562	2009 RA_{57}	—	September 15, 2009	Kitt Peak	Spacewatch	L4	7.3 km	MPC · JPL
665563	2009 RL_{57}	—	December 31, 2005	Kitt Peak	Spacewatch	·	3.0 km	MPC · JPL
665564	2009 RD_{58}	—	September 13, 2009	ESA OGS	ESA OGS	·	2.8 km	MPC · JPL
665565	2009 RM_{59}	—	September 15, 2009	Kitt Peak	Spacewatch	WIT	960 m	MPC · JPL
665566	2009 RV_{64}	—	September 23, 2009	Kitt Peak	Spacewatch	·	1.4 km	MPC · JPL
665567	2009 RV_{67}	—	July 27, 2009	Kitt Peak	Spacewatch	(31811)	3.0 km	MPC · JPL
665568	2009 RZ_{68}	—	September 15, 2009	Kitt Peak	Spacewatch	L4	7.1 km	MPC · JPL
665569	2009 RH_{75}	—	September 15, 2009	Catalina	CSS	·	3.4 km	MPC · JPL
665570	2009 RH_{78}	—	September 14, 2009	Kitt Peak	Spacewatch	·	600 m	MPC · JPL
665571	2009 RJ_{78}	—	September 15, 2009	Kitt Peak	Spacewatch	·	620 m	MPC · JPL
665572	2009 RP_{78}	—	January 26, 2012	Mount Lemmon	Mount Lemmon Survey	·	2.6 km	MPC · JPL
665573	2009 RX_{79}	—	November 12, 2010	Mount Lemmon	Mount Lemmon Survey	L4	7.0 km	MPC · JPL
665574	2009 RO_{80}	—	September 15, 2009	Kitt Peak	Spacewatch	·	1.2 km	MPC · JPL
665575	2009 RV_{81}	—	September 15, 2009	Kitt Peak	Spacewatch	EOS	1.4 km	MPC · JPL
665576	2009 RZ_{81}	—	September 14, 2009	Kitt Peak	Spacewatch	L4	6.7 km	MPC · JPL
665577	2009 RO_{82}	—	September 12, 2009	Kitt Peak	Spacewatch	L4	5.7 km	MPC · JPL
665578	2009 SG_{4}	—	September 16, 2009	Mount Lemmon	Mount Lemmon Survey	EOS	1.2 km	MPC · JPL
665579	2009 SM_{6}	—	September 29, 2005	Kitt Peak	Spacewatch	·	1.0 km	MPC · JPL
665580	2009 SQ_{6}	—	April 15, 2001	Kitt Peak	Spacewatch	·	3.6 km	MPC · JPL
665581	2009 SN_{7}	—	September 16, 2009	Mount Lemmon	Mount Lemmon Survey	·	600 m	MPC · JPL
665582	2009 SH_{9}	—	September 16, 2009	Mount Lemmon	Mount Lemmon Survey	·	2.4 km	MPC · JPL
665583 Nikiforov	2009 SB_{14}	Nikiforov	September 17, 2009	Zelenchukskaya Station	T. V. Krjačko, B. Satovski	H	420 m	MPC · JPL
665584	2009 SY_{17}	—	October 8, 2004	Kitt Peak	Spacewatch	·	3.0 km	MPC · JPL
665585	2009 SP_{19}	—	September 20, 2009	Tzec Maun	Nevski, V.	·	520 m	MPC · JPL
665586	2009 SG_{20}	—	September 22, 2009	Catalina	CSS	·	2.9 km	MPC · JPL
665587	2009 SJ_{20}	—	September 18, 2009	Kitt Peak	Spacewatch	·	650 m	MPC · JPL
665588	2009 SR_{21}	—	September 18, 2009	Bergisch Gladbach	W. Bickel	(43176)	3.4 km	MPC · JPL
665589	2009 SA_{22}	—	September 12, 2005	Kitt Peak	Spacewatch	·	1.0 km	MPC · JPL
665590	2009 SO_{24}	—	September 16, 2009	Kitt Peak	Spacewatch	·	2.5 km	MPC · JPL
665591	2009 SQ_{30}	—	September 16, 2009	Kitt Peak	Spacewatch	·	530 m	MPC · JPL
665592	2009 ST_{30}	—	September 12, 2009	Kitt Peak	Spacewatch	·	510 m	MPC · JPL
665593	2009 SG_{31}	—	August 25, 2003	Cerro Tololo	Deep Ecliptic Survey	THM	2.3 km	MPC · JPL
665594	2009 SJ_{35}	—	October 9, 2005	Kitt Peak	Spacewatch	·	1.4 km	MPC · JPL
665595	2009 SL_{37}	—	September 16, 2009	Kitt Peak	Spacewatch	·	990 m	MPC · JPL
665596	2009 SO_{37}	—	September 16, 2009	Kitt Peak	Spacewatch	EOS	1.3 km	MPC · JPL
665597	2009 SP_{38}	—	September 16, 2009	Kitt Peak	Spacewatch	·	1.8 km	MPC · JPL
665598	2009 SF_{39}	—	March 10, 2007	Mount Lemmon	Mount Lemmon Survey	MAR	860 m	MPC · JPL
665599	2009 SQ_{41}	—	August 20, 2009	Kitt Peak	Spacewatch	·	2.8 km	MPC · JPL
665600	2009 SA_{43}	—	September 16, 2009	Kitt Peak	Spacewatch	EOS	1.8 km	MPC · JPL

== 665601–665700 ==
back to top

Designation			Discovery			Properties		Ref
Permanent	Provisional	Named after	Date	Site	Discoverer(s)	Category	Diam.	Ref
665601	2009 SX_{43}	—	September 16, 2009	Kitt Peak	Spacewatch	·	510 m	MPC · JPL
665602	2009 SQ_{44}	—	September 16, 2009	Kitt Peak	Spacewatch	·	540 m	MPC · JPL
665603	2009 SP_{46}	—	September 16, 2009	Kitt Peak	Spacewatch	L4	6.6 km	MPC · JPL
665604	2009 SD_{47}	—	September 16, 2009	Kitt Peak	Spacewatch	L4	7.7 km	MPC · JPL
665605	2009 SG_{51}	—	September 17, 2009	Kitt Peak	Spacewatch	(883)	560 m	MPC · JPL
665606	2009 SW_{54}	—	September 17, 2009	Mount Lemmon	Mount Lemmon Survey	·	2.7 km	MPC · JPL
665607	2009 SV_{55}	—	September 17, 2009	Kitt Peak	Spacewatch	·	2.5 km	MPC · JPL
665608	2009 SA_{56}	—	September 17, 2009	Kitt Peak	Spacewatch	(1547)	1.2 km	MPC · JPL
665609	2009 SV_{56}	—	September 30, 2003	Kitt Peak	Spacewatch	·	3.1 km	MPC · JPL
665610	2009 SG_{60}	—	September 17, 2009	Kitt Peak	Spacewatch	·	2.8 km	MPC · JPL
665611	2009 SA_{64}	—	September 17, 2009	Mount Lemmon	Mount Lemmon Survey	·	2.6 km	MPC · JPL
665612	2009 SP_{69}	—	September 17, 2009	Kitt Peak	Spacewatch	L4	5.8 km	MPC · JPL
665613	2009 SW_{77}	—	September 17, 2009	Moletai	K. Černis, Zdanavicius, K.	·	2.2 km	MPC · JPL
665614	2009 ST_{80}	—	August 16, 2009	Kitt Peak	Spacewatch	·	2.5 km	MPC · JPL
665615	2009 SW_{81}	—	August 27, 2009	Kitt Peak	Spacewatch	·	1.7 km	MPC · JPL
665616	2009 SP_{83}	—	September 18, 2009	Mount Lemmon	Mount Lemmon Survey	·	2.5 km	MPC · JPL
665617	2009 SU_{86}	—	February 9, 2008	Kitt Peak	Spacewatch	·	560 m	MPC · JPL
665618	2009 SY_{87}	—	September 18, 2009	Kitt Peak	Spacewatch	·	700 m	MPC · JPL
665619	2009 SQ_{91}	—	March 9, 2007	Kitt Peak	Spacewatch	·	2.6 km	MPC · JPL
665620	2009 SY_{94}	—	August 17, 2009	Kitt Peak	Spacewatch	·	2.2 km	MPC · JPL
665621	2009 SD_{99}	—	September 24, 2009	Kitt Peak	Spacewatch	·	2.9 km	MPC · JPL
665622	2009 SP_{99}	—	September 22, 2009	La Silla	A. Galád	·	3.2 km	MPC · JPL
665623	2009 SV_{99}	—	September 23, 2009	Taunus	Karge, S., R. Kling	·	530 m	MPC · JPL
665624	2009 SB_{106}	—	September 16, 2009	Mount Lemmon	Mount Lemmon Survey	·	2.2 km	MPC · JPL
665625	2009 SN_{107}	—	March 17, 2001	Kitt Peak	Spacewatch	·	3.2 km	MPC · JPL
665626	2009 SW_{108}	—	September 1, 2009	Bergisch Gladbach	W. Bickel	EOS	1.7 km	MPC · JPL
665627	2009 SY_{108}	—	October 10, 2005	Catalina	CSS	·	1.5 km	MPC · JPL
665628	2009 SX_{117}	—	September 18, 2009	Kitt Peak	Spacewatch	·	1.1 km	MPC · JPL
665629	2009 SV_{120}	—	September 18, 2009	Kitt Peak	Spacewatch	HNS	900 m	MPC · JPL
665630	2009 SC_{123}	—	September 18, 2009	Kitt Peak	Spacewatch	TIR	2.6 km	MPC · JPL
665631	2009 SF_{123}	—	September 18, 2009	Kitt Peak	Spacewatch	·	1.4 km	MPC · JPL
665632	2009 SZ_{125}	—	September 18, 2009	Kitt Peak	Spacewatch	·	1.2 km	MPC · JPL
665633	2009 SZ_{128}	—	October 1, 2005	Kitt Peak	Spacewatch	·	1.1 km	MPC · JPL
665634	2009 SO_{129}	—	July 28, 2009	Kitt Peak	Spacewatch	·	2.8 km	MPC · JPL
665635	2009 SE_{130}	—	September 18, 2009	Kitt Peak	Spacewatch	·	690 m	MPC · JPL
665636	2009 SL_{130}	—	September 18, 2009	Kitt Peak	Spacewatch	·	1.2 km	MPC · JPL
665637	2009 SX_{131}	—	September 18, 2009	Kitt Peak	Spacewatch	·	900 m	MPC · JPL
665638	2009 SE_{135}	—	September 18, 2009	Kitt Peak	Spacewatch	HNS	1.0 km	MPC · JPL
665639	2009 SQ_{137}	—	September 18, 2009	Kitt Peak	Spacewatch	L4	5.3 km	MPC · JPL
665640	2009 SR_{139}	—	November 17, 2004	Campo Imperatore	CINEOS	EOS	1.8 km	MPC · JPL
665641	2009 SU_{140}	—	September 19, 2009	Kitt Peak	Spacewatch	·	3.5 km	MPC · JPL
665642	2009 SC_{142}	—	September 15, 2009	Kitt Peak	Spacewatch	L4	6.4 km	MPC · JPL
665643	2009 SF_{148}	—	September 19, 2009	Mount Lemmon	Mount Lemmon Survey	L4	6.8 km	MPC · JPL
665644	2009 SV_{148}	—	August 27, 2009	Catalina	CSS	·	1.2 km	MPC · JPL
665645	2009 SX_{148}	—	August 26, 2009	Catalina	CSS	·	1.6 km	MPC · JPL
665646	2009 SP_{151}	—	September 20, 2009	Kitt Peak	Spacewatch	·	1.2 km	MPC · JPL
665647	2009 SJ_{152}	—	August 15, 2009	Kitt Peak	Spacewatch	·	1.2 km	MPC · JPL
665648	2009 ST_{152}	—	October 4, 2006	Mount Lemmon	Mount Lemmon Survey	·	570 m	MPC · JPL
665649	2009 SZ_{154}	—	August 27, 2009	Kitt Peak	Spacewatch	·	880 m	MPC · JPL
665650	2009 SS_{157}	—	September 20, 2009	Kitt Peak	Spacewatch	URS	2.3 km	MPC · JPL
665651	2009 SE_{159}	—	September 20, 2009	Kitt Peak	Spacewatch	L4	6.8 km	MPC · JPL
665652	2009 SF_{159}	—	September 20, 2009	Kitt Peak	Spacewatch	·	740 m	MPC · JPL
665653	2009 SP_{159}	—	September 20, 2009	Kitt Peak	Spacewatch	·	1.1 km	MPC · JPL
665654	2009 SA_{160}	—	November 28, 2006	Mount Lemmon	Mount Lemmon Survey	·	530 m	MPC · JPL
665655	2009 SJ_{160}	—	September 20, 2009	Kitt Peak	Spacewatch	·	560 m	MPC · JPL
665656	2009 SA_{161}	—	September 20, 2009	Catalina	CSS	JUN	970 m	MPC · JPL
665657	2009 SM_{163}	—	September 21, 2009	Mount Lemmon	Mount Lemmon Survey	·	2.1 km	MPC · JPL
665658	2009 SP_{165}	—	February 24, 2006	Kitt Peak	Spacewatch	·	2.5 km	MPC · JPL
665659	2009 SS_{166}	—	September 21, 2009	Kitt Peak	Spacewatch	·	2.4 km	MPC · JPL
665660	2009 SN_{172}	—	September 24, 2009	Mount Lemmon	Mount Lemmon Survey	·	580 m	MPC · JPL
665661	2009 SV_{173}	—	September 18, 2009	Catalina	CSS	·	1.7 km	MPC · JPL
665662	2009 SE_{175}	—	October 18, 2006	Kitt Peak	Spacewatch	·	520 m	MPC · JPL
665663	2009 SS_{177}	—	September 20, 2009	Kitt Peak	Spacewatch	·	2.0 km	MPC · JPL
665664	2009 SG_{178}	—	August 29, 2005	Palomar	NEAT	·	1.2 km	MPC · JPL
665665	2009 ST_{178}	—	September 20, 2009	Mount Lemmon	Mount Lemmon Survey	·	2.1 km	MPC · JPL
665666	2009 SR_{183}	—	November 11, 2006	Kitt Peak	Spacewatch	·	560 m	MPC · JPL
665667	2009 SS_{185}	—	September 21, 2009	Kitt Peak	Spacewatch	LIX	3.0 km	MPC · JPL
665668	2009 SQ_{188}	—	September 21, 2009	Kitt Peak	Spacewatch	·	1.1 km	MPC · JPL
665669	2009 SK_{190}	—	September 22, 2009	Kitt Peak	Spacewatch	·	2.0 km	MPC · JPL
665670	2009 SF_{192}	—	September 29, 2005	Kitt Peak	Spacewatch	·	950 m	MPC · JPL
665671	2009 SC_{194}	—	September 22, 2009	Kitt Peak	Spacewatch	·	2.6 km	MPC · JPL
665672	2009 SD_{194}	—	September 22, 2009	Kitt Peak	Spacewatch	·	1.1 km	MPC · JPL
665673	2009 SO_{197}	—	September 22, 2009	Kitt Peak	Spacewatch	·	2.6 km	MPC · JPL
665674	2009 SM_{199}	—	September 22, 2009	Kitt Peak	Spacewatch	·	2.8 km	MPC · JPL
665675	2009 SU_{200}	—	August 24, 2003	Palomar	NEAT	·	2.9 km	MPC · JPL
665676	2009 SZ_{201}	—	September 18, 2009	Kitt Peak	Spacewatch	·	620 m	MPC · JPL
665677	2009 SK_{205}	—	September 22, 2009	Kitt Peak	Spacewatch	·	2.9 km	MPC · JPL
665678	2009 SC_{207}	—	September 23, 2009	Kitt Peak	Spacewatch	·	540 m	MPC · JPL
665679	2009 SZ_{208}	—	December 26, 2006	Eskridge	G. Hug	·	600 m	MPC · JPL
665680	2009 SG_{210}	—	September 23, 2009	Mount Lemmon	Mount Lemmon Survey	KOR	1.6 km	MPC · JPL
665681	2009 SS_{211}	—	September 23, 2009	Mount Lemmon	Mount Lemmon Survey	·	580 m	MPC · JPL
665682	2009 SS_{216}	—	September 15, 2009	Kitt Peak	Spacewatch	·	580 m	MPC · JPL
665683	2009 SS_{218}	—	September 24, 2009	Mount Lemmon	Mount Lemmon Survey	·	2.4 km	MPC · JPL
665684	2009 SS_{219}	—	September 24, 2009	Mount Lemmon	Mount Lemmon Survey	·	950 m	MPC · JPL
665685	2009 SE_{222}	—	September 25, 2009	Mount Lemmon	Mount Lemmon Survey	·	460 m	MPC · JPL
665686	2009 SP_{222}	—	August 17, 2009	Kitt Peak	Spacewatch	·	530 m	MPC · JPL
665687	2009 SH_{223}	—	March 14, 2007	Kitt Peak	Spacewatch	·	2.7 km	MPC · JPL
665688	2009 SJ_{226}	—	March 12, 2008	Kitt Peak	Spacewatch	·	1.2 km	MPC · JPL
665689	2009 SR_{227}	—	March 16, 2007	Kitt Peak	Spacewatch	LIX	3.9 km	MPC · JPL
665690	2009 SH_{229}	—	August 30, 2005	Kitt Peak	Spacewatch	·	750 m	MPC · JPL
665691	2009 SM_{230}	—	August 28, 2009	Catalina	CSS	JUN	800 m	MPC · JPL
665692	2009 SS_{231}	—	March 12, 2008	Kitt Peak	Spacewatch	·	1.2 km	MPC · JPL
665693	2009 SG_{236}	—	September 16, 2009	Catalina	CSS	(1547)	1.5 km	MPC · JPL
665694	2009 SM_{237}	—	September 16, 2009	Catalina	CSS	·	1.1 km	MPC · JPL
665695	2009 ST_{238}	—	September 16, 2009	Catalina	CSS	·	580 m	MPC · JPL
665696	2009 SW_{239}	—	August 31, 2009	Siding Spring	SSS	·	1.4 km	MPC · JPL
665697	2009 SA_{244}	—	September 15, 2009	Catalina	CSS	·	2.1 km	MPC · JPL
665698	2009 SG_{245}	—	September 21, 2009	Kitt Peak	Spacewatch	·	560 m	MPC · JPL
665699	2009 SC_{248}	—	November 7, 2010	Mount Lemmon	Mount Lemmon Survey	EOS	2.1 km	MPC · JPL
665700	2009 SH_{249}	—	September 18, 2009	Kitt Peak	Spacewatch	L4	7.8 km	MPC · JPL

== 665701–665800 ==
back to top

Designation			Discovery			Properties		Ref
Permanent	Provisional	Named after	Date	Site	Discoverer(s)	Category	Diam.	Ref
665701	2009 SN_{250}	—	September 19, 2009	Kitt Peak	Spacewatch	·	2.8 km	MPC · JPL
665702	2009 SA_{251}	—	September 20, 2009	Kitt Peak	Spacewatch	L4	5.6 km	MPC · JPL
665703	2009 SJ_{251}	—	September 20, 2009	Kitt Peak	Spacewatch	·	490 m	MPC · JPL
665704	2009 SK_{255}	—	September 16, 2009	Siding Spring	SSS	·	1.8 km	MPC · JPL
665705	2009 SE_{257}	—	August 29, 2009	Kitt Peak	Spacewatch	·	1.4 km	MPC · JPL
665706	2009 SM_{259}	—	October 7, 2004	Kitt Peak	Spacewatch	KOR	2.0 km	MPC · JPL
665707	2009 SQ_{259}	—	February 9, 2008	Mount Lemmon	Mount Lemmon Survey	NYS	1.2 km	MPC · JPL
665708	2009 SQ_{262}	—	September 23, 2009	Mount Lemmon	Mount Lemmon Survey	URS	3.7 km	MPC · JPL
665709	2009 SF_{263}	—	September 23, 2009	Mount Lemmon	Mount Lemmon Survey	·	620 m	MPC · JPL
665710	2009 SE_{264}	—	September 23, 2009	Mount Lemmon	Mount Lemmon Survey	·	3.1 km	MPC · JPL
665711	2009 SA_{265}	—	September 15, 2009	Kitt Peak	Spacewatch	HNS	1.0 km	MPC · JPL
665712	2009 SK_{265}	—	April 23, 2007	Mount Lemmon	Mount Lemmon Survey	HNS	1.0 km	MPC · JPL
665713	2009 SH_{267}	—	September 23, 2009	Mount Lemmon	Mount Lemmon Survey	EUN	1.0 km	MPC · JPL
665714	2009 SE_{269}	—	August 15, 2009	Kitt Peak	Spacewatch	·	590 m	MPC · JPL
665715	2009 SL_{269}	—	February 22, 2004	Catalina	CSS	·	700 m	MPC · JPL
665716	2009 SL_{271}	—	September 16, 2009	Kitt Peak	Spacewatch	·	2.6 km	MPC · JPL
665717	2009 SS_{272}	—	September 24, 2009	Zelenchukskaya Station	T. V. Krjačko, B. Satovski	·	3.1 km	MPC · JPL
665718	2009 SV_{272}	—	September 25, 2009	Kitt Peak	Spacewatch	·	1.2 km	MPC · JPL
665719	2009 SD_{273}	—	January 27, 2007	Kitt Peak	Spacewatch	·	1.0 km	MPC · JPL
665720	2009 SG_{274}	—	September 25, 2009	Kitt Peak	Spacewatch	·	510 m	MPC · JPL
665721	2009 SQ_{282}	—	September 25, 2009	Kitt Peak	Spacewatch	VER	2.5 km	MPC · JPL
665722	2009 SK_{283}	—	September 17, 2009	Kitt Peak	Spacewatch	·	1.1 km	MPC · JPL
665723	2009 SF_{289}	—	April 16, 2007	Bergisch Gladbach	W. Bickel	·	2.1 km	MPC · JPL
665724	2009 ST_{289}	—	September 25, 2009	Kitt Peak	Spacewatch	L4	7.5 km	MPC · JPL
665725	2009 SN_{295}	—	September 27, 2009	Kitt Peak	Spacewatch	·	760 m	MPC · JPL
665726	2009 SF_{298}	—	September 25, 2009	Kitt Peak	Spacewatch	·	3.3 km	MPC · JPL
665727	2009 SU_{301}	—	September 16, 2009	Mount Lemmon	Mount Lemmon Survey	·	680 m	MPC · JPL
665728	2009 SW_{304}	—	August 18, 2009	Kitt Peak	Spacewatch	·	520 m	MPC · JPL
665729	2009 SD_{305}	—	November 23, 2006	Mount Lemmon	Mount Lemmon Survey	·	550 m	MPC · JPL
665730	2009 SQ_{305}	—	September 17, 2009	Mount Lemmon	Mount Lemmon Survey	·	1.4 km	MPC · JPL
665731	2009 ST_{306}	—	September 17, 2009	Kitt Peak	Spacewatch	L4	6.5 km	MPC · JPL
665732	2009 SD_{308}	—	September 17, 2009	Mount Lemmon	Mount Lemmon Survey	·	630 m	MPC · JPL
665733	2009 SE_{313}	—	September 18, 2009	Kitt Peak	Spacewatch	L4	7.6 km	MPC · JPL
665734	2009 SJ_{314}	—	September 19, 2009	Kitt Peak	Spacewatch	·	2.8 km	MPC · JPL
665735	2009 SY_{318}	—	September 20, 2009	Mount Lemmon	Mount Lemmon Survey	VER	2.4 km	MPC · JPL
665736	2009 SJ_{323}	—	March 27, 1995	Kitt Peak	Spacewatch	RAF	1.0 km	MPC · JPL
665737	2009 SV_{323}	—	September 24, 2009	Mount Lemmon	Mount Lemmon Survey	·	940 m	MPC · JPL
665738	2009 SX_{326}	—	September 19, 2009	Catalina	CSS	·	1.4 km	MPC · JPL
665739	2009 SR_{333}	—	August 15, 2009	Kitt Peak	Spacewatch	·	510 m	MPC · JPL
665740	2009 SY_{339}	—	September 20, 2009	Mount Lemmon	Mount Lemmon Survey	·	970 m	MPC · JPL
665741	2009 SR_{342}	—	September 16, 2009	Kitt Peak	Spacewatch	·	3.5 km	MPC · JPL
665742	2009 ST_{347}	—	September 16, 2009	Kitt Peak	Spacewatch	·	1.2 km	MPC · JPL
665743	2009 SY_{347}	—	September 16, 2009	Kitt Peak	Spacewatch	·	1.1 km	MPC · JPL
665744	2009 SQ_{359}	—	September 25, 2009	Catalina	CSS	·	3.4 km	MPC · JPL
665745	2009 SG_{363}	—	August 18, 2009	Kitt Peak	Spacewatch	V	750 m	MPC · JPL
665746	2009 SN_{366}	—	June 5, 2011	Catalina	CSS	H	550 m	MPC · JPL
665747	2009 SV_{369}	—	August 28, 2014	Haleakala	Pan-STARRS 1	·	2.0 km	MPC · JPL
665748	2009 SC_{370}	—	September 22, 2009	Mount Lemmon	Mount Lemmon Survey	L4	7.8 km	MPC · JPL
665749	2009 SH_{371}	—	October 20, 1998	Kitt Peak	Spacewatch	·	2.9 km	MPC · JPL
665750	2009 SK_{373}	—	September 14, 2013	Haleakala	Pan-STARRS 1	ADE	1.6 km	MPC · JPL
665751	2009 SM_{373}	—	August 28, 2014	Haleakala	Pan-STARRS 1	EOS	2.1 km	MPC · JPL
665752	2009 SP_{374}	—	January 3, 2012	Mount Lemmon	Mount Lemmon Survey	EMA	3.4 km	MPC · JPL
665753	2009 SX_{374}	—	December 21, 2006	Kitt Peak	L. H. Wasserman, M. W. Buie	·	2.7 km	MPC · JPL
665754	2009 SZ_{374}	—	November 22, 2014	Haleakala	Pan-STARRS 1	·	1.6 km	MPC · JPL
665755	2009 SD_{375}	—	July 25, 2015	Haleakala	Pan-STARRS 1	T_{j} (2.96)	3.5 km	MPC · JPL
665756	2009 SD_{376}	—	February 16, 2012	Haleakala	Pan-STARRS 1	·	2.6 km	MPC · JPL
665757	2009 SN_{376}	—	August 3, 2014	Haleakala	Pan-STARRS 1	·	2.8 km	MPC · JPL
665758	2009 SK_{377}	—	March 31, 2013	Mount Lemmon	Mount Lemmon Survey	·	2.7 km	MPC · JPL
665759	2009 SO_{377}	—	September 18, 2009	Kitt Peak	Spacewatch	·	620 m	MPC · JPL
665760	2009 SS_{381}	—	September 12, 2009	Kitt Peak	Spacewatch	HNS	940 m	MPC · JPL
665761	2009 SF_{382}	—	September 19, 2009	Mount Lemmon	Mount Lemmon Survey	·	590 m	MPC · JPL
665762	2009 SV_{382}	—	September 28, 2009	Kitt Peak	Spacewatch	·	460 m	MPC · JPL
665763	2009 SA_{383}	—	September 29, 2009	Mount Lemmon	Mount Lemmon Survey	·	720 m	MPC · JPL
665764	2009 SA_{384}	—	September 29, 2009	Mount Lemmon	Mount Lemmon Survey	·	1.2 km	MPC · JPL
665765	2009 SM_{385}	—	October 4, 1999	Kitt Peak	Spacewatch	·	550 m	MPC · JPL
665766	2009 SO_{385}	—	September 26, 2009	Kitt Peak	Spacewatch	·	1.2 km	MPC · JPL
665767	2009 SV_{385}	—	May 6, 2016	Haleakala	Pan-STARRS 1	HNS	830 m	MPC · JPL
665768	2009 SH_{390}	—	September 23, 2015	Haleakala	Pan-STARRS 1	·	2.4 km	MPC · JPL
665769	2009 SD_{391}	—	September 19, 2009	Mount Lemmon	Mount Lemmon Survey	THB	2.5 km	MPC · JPL
665770	2009 SE_{391}	—	September 10, 2013	Haleakala	Pan-STARRS 1	HNS	870 m	MPC · JPL
665771	2009 SY_{391}	—	January 16, 2018	Haleakala	Pan-STARRS 1	THM	1.8 km	MPC · JPL
665772	2009 SG_{392}	—	January 24, 2015	Haleakala	Pan-STARRS 1	·	1.2 km	MPC · JPL
665773	2009 SN_{392}	—	September 17, 2009	Kitt Peak	Spacewatch	·	580 m	MPC · JPL
665774	2009 SV_{393}	—	September 28, 2009	Mount Lemmon	Mount Lemmon Survey	L4	6.8 km	MPC · JPL
665775	2009 SB_{394}	—	September 25, 2009	Kitt Peak	Spacewatch	3:2	5.6 km	MPC · JPL
665776	2009 SO_{396}	—	September 29, 2009	Mount Lemmon	Mount Lemmon Survey	L4	7.1 km	MPC · JPL
665777	2009 SR_{396}	—	September 19, 2009	Catalina	CSS	·	1.3 km	MPC · JPL
665778	2009 SU_{396}	—	September 28, 2009	Mount Lemmon	Mount Lemmon Survey	L4	6.5 km	MPC · JPL
665779	2009 SG_{398}	—	September 17, 2009	Kitt Peak	Spacewatch	·	1.7 km	MPC · JPL
665780	2009 SP_{401}	—	September 19, 2009	Mount Lemmon	Mount Lemmon Survey	L4	6.7 km	MPC · JPL
665781	2009 SX_{403}	—	September 18, 2009	Mount Lemmon	Mount Lemmon Survey	·	2.6 km	MPC · JPL
665782	2009 SA_{404}	—	September 22, 2009	Mount Lemmon	Mount Lemmon Survey	L4	5.9 km	MPC · JPL
665783	2009 SN_{404}	—	September 21, 2009	Kitt Peak	Spacewatch	L4	6.0 km	MPC · JPL
665784	2009 SU_{404}	—	September 29, 2009	Mount Lemmon	Mount Lemmon Survey	L4	6.1 km	MPC · JPL
665785	2009 SX_{404}	—	September 17, 2009	Kitt Peak	Spacewatch	·	2.3 km	MPC · JPL
665786	2009 SL_{412}	—	September 18, 2009	Kitt Peak	Spacewatch	L4	7.3 km	MPC · JPL
665787	2009 SW_{412}	—	September 20, 2009	Mount Lemmon	Mount Lemmon Survey	L4	7.9 km	MPC · JPL
665788	2009 SH_{413}	—	September 22, 2009	Kitt Peak	Spacewatch	L4	6.5 km	MPC · JPL
665789	2009 SL_{414}	—	September 18, 2009	Kitt Peak	Spacewatch	·	1.2 km	MPC · JPL
665790	2009 SU_{414}	—	September 18, 2009	Kitt Peak	Spacewatch	L4	6.2 km	MPC · JPL
665791	2009 SD_{419}	—	September 30, 2009	Mount Lemmon	Mount Lemmon Survey	·	2.7 km	MPC · JPL
665792	2009 SN_{420}	—	September 29, 2009	Mount Lemmon	Mount Lemmon Survey	L4	6.2 km	MPC · JPL
665793	2009 SU_{420}	—	September 26, 2009	Kitt Peak	Spacewatch	·	2.4 km	MPC · JPL
665794	2009 SR_{421}	—	September 17, 2009	Kitt Peak	Spacewatch	L4	6.0 km	MPC · JPL
665795	2009 SD_{425}	—	September 26, 2009	Kitt Peak	Spacewatch	·	1.1 km	MPC · JPL
665796	2009 SX_{426}	—	September 26, 2009	Kitt Peak	Spacewatch	·	1.2 km	MPC · JPL
665797	2009 TP_{1}	—	October 2, 2009	Mount Lemmon	Mount Lemmon Survey	·	1.9 km	MPC · JPL
665798	2009 TN_{3}	—	October 11, 2009	La Sagra	OAM	·	1.6 km	MPC · JPL
665799	2009 TA_{10}	—	October 14, 2009	Tzec Maun	D. Chestnov, A. Novichonok	·	2.4 km	MPC · JPL
665800	2009 TH_{10}	—	September 29, 2009	Mount Lemmon	Mount Lemmon Survey	·	670 m	MPC · JPL

== 665801–665900 ==
back to top

Designation			Discovery			Properties		Ref
Permanent	Provisional	Named after	Date	Site	Discoverer(s)	Category	Diam.	Ref
665801	2009 TN_{11}	—	September 19, 2009	Kitt Peak	Spacewatch	·	1.8 km	MPC · JPL
665802	2009 TR_{11}	—	July 30, 2005	Palomar	NEAT	NYS	1.2 km	MPC · JPL
665803	2009 TT_{12}	—	September 17, 2009	Kitt Peak	Spacewatch	·	590 m	MPC · JPL
665804	2009 TM_{22}	—	October 13, 2009	La Sagra	OAM	EOS	2.2 km	MPC · JPL
665805	2009 TO_{23}	—	October 14, 2009	Mount Lemmon	Mount Lemmon Survey	·	2.5 km	MPC · JPL
665806	2009 TP_{25}	—	November 16, 2006	Kitt Peak	Spacewatch	·	620 m	MPC · JPL
665807	2009 TS_{25}	—	November 14, 2006	Mount Lemmon	Mount Lemmon Survey	·	730 m	MPC · JPL
665808	2009 TU_{31}	—	September 16, 2009	Mount Lemmon	Mount Lemmon Survey	·	2.9 km	MPC · JPL
665809	2009 TM_{37}	—	December 5, 2002	Haleakala	NEAT	·	880 m	MPC · JPL
665810	2009 TG_{40}	—	October 15, 2009	Catalina	CSS	·	2.0 km	MPC · JPL
665811	2009 TC_{41}	—	September 21, 2009	Kitt Peak	Spacewatch	·	1.6 km	MPC · JPL
665812	2009 TR_{42}	—	October 12, 2009	Mount Lemmon	Mount Lemmon Survey	·	620 m	MPC · JPL
665813	2009 TN_{43}	—	October 30, 2005	Mount Lemmon	Mount Lemmon Survey	ADE	1.9 km	MPC · JPL
665814	2009 TG_{45}	—	October 15, 2009	Catalina	CSS	·	1.4 km	MPC · JPL
665815	2009 TT_{45}	—	October 2, 2009	Mount Lemmon	Mount Lemmon Survey	·	2.7 km	MPC · JPL
665816	2009 TU_{50}	—	February 26, 2012	Haleakala	Pan-STARRS 1	·	1.5 km	MPC · JPL
665817	2009 TD_{51}	—	October 12, 2009	Mount Lemmon	Mount Lemmon Survey	·	500 m	MPC · JPL
665818	2009 TP_{51}	—	October 14, 2009	Mount Lemmon	Mount Lemmon Survey	·	570 m	MPC · JPL
665819	2009 TT_{51}	—	October 1, 2009	Mount Lemmon	Mount Lemmon Survey	·	630 m	MPC · JPL
665820	2009 TX_{51}	—	November 14, 2010	Mount Lemmon	Mount Lemmon Survey	·	3.3 km	MPC · JPL
665821	2009 TY_{51}	—	February 8, 2011	Mount Lemmon	Mount Lemmon Survey	·	1.9 km	MPC · JPL
665822	2009 TN_{53}	—	April 16, 2013	Haleakala	Pan-STARRS 1	·	2.8 km	MPC · JPL
665823	2009 TM_{56}	—	October 12, 2009	Kitt Peak	Spacewatch	·	470 m	MPC · JPL
665824	2009 TG_{58}	—	October 14, 2009	Mount Lemmon	Mount Lemmon Survey	·	3.2 km	MPC · JPL
665825	2009 UW_{1}	—	October 16, 2009	Sandlot	G. Hug	HNS	1.0 km	MPC · JPL
665826	2009 UB_{2}	—	September 25, 2009	Catalina	CSS	·	1.8 km	MPC · JPL
665827	2009 UO_{5}	—	September 22, 2009	Catalina	CSS	BAR	1.1 km	MPC · JPL
665828	2009 UN_{9}	—	June 13, 2005	Mount Lemmon	Mount Lemmon Survey	NYS	1.2 km	MPC · JPL
665829	2009 UZ_{9}	—	September 27, 2009	Mount Lemmon	Mount Lemmon Survey	·	1.7 km	MPC · JPL
665830	2009 US_{12}	—	March 17, 2007	Kitt Peak	Spacewatch	·	2.9 km	MPC · JPL
665831	2009 UU_{12}	—	September 15, 2009	Kitt Peak	Spacewatch	EOS	1.8 km	MPC · JPL
665832	2009 UV_{12}	—	April 11, 2007	Kitt Peak	Spacewatch	·	1.9 km	MPC · JPL
665833	2009 UL_{15}	—	October 16, 2009	Mount Lemmon	Mount Lemmon Survey	·	570 m	MPC · JPL
665834	2009 UG_{19}	—	October 19, 2009	Tiki	Teamo, N.	·	2.4 km	MPC · JPL
665835	2009 UJ_{19}	—	October 22, 2009	Sierra Stars	Stars, Sierra	·	1.0 km	MPC · JPL
665836	2009 UO_{19}	—	October 22, 2009	Catalina	CSS	JUN	930 m	MPC · JPL
665837	2009 UR_{20}	—	September 29, 2009	Mount Lemmon	Mount Lemmon Survey	·	1.7 km	MPC · JPL
665838	2009 UK_{21}	—	October 16, 2009	Mount Lemmon	Mount Lemmon Survey	·	490 m	MPC · JPL
665839	2009 UH_{24}	—	April 28, 2007	Kitt Peak	Spacewatch	·	2.7 km	MPC · JPL
665840	2009 UQ_{25}	—	May 10, 2005	Mount Lemmon	Mount Lemmon Survey	·	890 m	MPC · JPL
665841	2009 UW_{25}	—	October 21, 2009	Catalina	CSS	·	1.4 km	MPC · JPL
665842	2009 UA_{29}	—	September 16, 2009	Mount Lemmon	Mount Lemmon Survey	·	460 m	MPC · JPL
665843	2009 UM_{34}	—	September 27, 2009	Mount Lemmon	Mount Lemmon Survey	WIT	940 m	MPC · JPL
665844	2009 UK_{36}	—	September 22, 2009	Mount Lemmon	Mount Lemmon Survey	·	1.0 km	MPC · JPL
665845	2009 US_{40}	—	September 22, 2009	Mount Lemmon	Mount Lemmon Survey	EUN	780 m	MPC · JPL
665846	2009 UV_{40}	—	February 25, 2007	Mount Lemmon	Mount Lemmon Survey	·	2.1 km	MPC · JPL
665847	2009 UA_{43}	—	October 18, 2009	Mount Lemmon	Mount Lemmon Survey	·	1.3 km	MPC · JPL
665848	2009 UQ_{45}	—	October 18, 2009	Mount Lemmon	Mount Lemmon Survey	L4	7.1 km	MPC · JPL
665849	2009 UU_{50}	—	October 22, 2009	Catalina	CSS	H	570 m	MPC · JPL
665850	2009 UL_{52}	—	October 11, 2009	Mount Lemmon	Mount Lemmon Survey	MRX	690 m	MPC · JPL
665851	2009 UP_{52}	—	September 22, 2009	Mount Lemmon	Mount Lemmon Survey	·	1.3 km	MPC · JPL
665852	2009 UC_{53}	—	October 22, 2009	Catalina	CSS	·	2.0 km	MPC · JPL
665853	2009 UQ_{55}	—	December 12, 1998	Kitt Peak	Spacewatch	·	3.0 km	MPC · JPL
665854	2009 UV_{55}	—	November 17, 2006	Kitt Peak	Spacewatch	·	730 m	MPC · JPL
665855	2009 UB_{59}	—	October 23, 2009	Mount Lemmon	Mount Lemmon Survey	·	760 m	MPC · JPL
665856	2009 UV_{60}	—	October 17, 2009	Mount Lemmon	Mount Lemmon Survey	EUN	900 m	MPC · JPL
665857	2009 UC_{62}	—	October 17, 2009	Mount Lemmon	Mount Lemmon Survey	L4	6.2 km	MPC · JPL
665858	2009 UZ_{64}	—	October 2, 2009	Mount Lemmon	Mount Lemmon Survey	·	890 m	MPC · JPL
665859	2009 UF_{68}	—	September 21, 2009	Kitt Peak	Spacewatch	·	1.2 km	MPC · JPL
665860	2009 UM_{69}	—	September 29, 2009	Kitt Peak	Spacewatch	·	360 m	MPC · JPL
665861	2009 UP_{69}	—	September 27, 2009	Catalina	CSS	·	1.8 km	MPC · JPL
665862	2009 UT_{69}	—	September 19, 2009	Mount Lemmon	Mount Lemmon Survey	·	1.4 km	MPC · JPL
665863	2009 UY_{70}	—	October 22, 2009	Catalina	CSS	·	710 m	MPC · JPL
665864	2009 UE_{73}	—	September 27, 2009	Mount Lemmon	Mount Lemmon Survey	MAR	870 m	MPC · JPL
665865	2009 UH_{75}	—	October 21, 2009	Mount Lemmon	Mount Lemmon Survey	·	2.7 km	MPC · JPL
665866	2009 UJ_{75}	—	March 1, 2008	Kitt Peak	Spacewatch	·	660 m	MPC · JPL
665867	2009 UJ_{81}	—	September 17, 2009	Mount Lemmon	Mount Lemmon Survey	·	670 m	MPC · JPL
665868	2009 UO_{81}	—	October 22, 2009	Mount Lemmon	Mount Lemmon Survey	·	1.3 km	MPC · JPL
665869	2009 UX_{82}	—	October 23, 2009	Mount Lemmon	Mount Lemmon Survey	·	1.4 km	MPC · JPL
665870	2009 UW_{85}	—	September 19, 2009	Mount Lemmon	Mount Lemmon Survey	·	3.1 km	MPC · JPL
665871	2009 UM_{86}	—	September 20, 2009	Mount Lemmon	Mount Lemmon Survey	·	580 m	MPC · JPL
665872	2009 UK_{90}	—	August 31, 2009	Siding Spring	SSS	·	1.8 km	MPC · JPL
665873	2009 UR_{90}	—	September 15, 2009	Kitt Peak	Spacewatch	·	540 m	MPC · JPL
665874	2009 UU_{90}	—	August 23, 2003	Palomar	NEAT	·	3.4 km	MPC · JPL
665875	2009 UC_{99}	—	October 23, 2009	Mount Lemmon	Mount Lemmon Survey	·	1.6 km	MPC · JPL
665876	2009 UM_{99}	—	October 23, 2009	Mount Lemmon	Mount Lemmon Survey	·	1.3 km	MPC · JPL
665877	2009 UD_{101}	—	October 23, 2009	Mount Lemmon	Mount Lemmon Survey	·	1.1 km	MPC · JPL
665878	2009 UV_{101}	—	October 23, 2009	Mount Lemmon	Mount Lemmon Survey	HNS	1.1 km	MPC · JPL
665879	2009 UV_{107}	—	October 14, 2009	Bergisch Gladbach	W. Bickel	·	2.9 km	MPC · JPL
665880	2009 UF_{109}	—	December 1, 2003	Kitt Peak	Spacewatch	·	2.3 km	MPC · JPL
665881	2009 UR_{110}	—	October 23, 2009	Kitt Peak	Spacewatch	·	650 m	MPC · JPL
665882	2009 UZ_{112}	—	April 11, 2007	Siding Spring	SSS	·	3.9 km	MPC · JPL
665883	2009 UL_{117}	—	April 11, 2005	Kitt Peak	Spacewatch	·	540 m	MPC · JPL
665884	2009 UB_{121}	—	July 12, 2004	Palomar	NEAT	·	2.1 km	MPC · JPL
665885	2009 UH_{122}	—	October 26, 2009	Mount Lemmon	Mount Lemmon Survey	·	610 m	MPC · JPL
665886	2009 UJ_{125}	—	October 14, 2009	Bergisch Gladbach	W. Bickel	VER	2.3 km	MPC · JPL
665887	2009 UN_{125}	—	October 15, 2009	Bergisch Gladbach	W. Bickel	(883)	620 m	MPC · JPL
665888	2009 US_{126}	—	November 20, 2004	Kitt Peak	Spacewatch	·	3.7 km	MPC · JPL
665889	2009 UK_{132}	—	July 28, 2005	Palomar	NEAT	·	1.2 km	MPC · JPL
665890	2009 UL_{141}	—	October 21, 2009	Mount Lemmon	Mount Lemmon Survey	·	1.6 km	MPC · JPL
665891	2009 UX_{143}	—	October 22, 2009	Mount Lemmon	Mount Lemmon Survey	L4	7.6 km	MPC · JPL
665892	2009 UZ_{148}	—	September 29, 2009	Kitt Peak	Spacewatch	L4	7.2 km	MPC · JPL
665893	2009 UB_{151}	—	October 24, 2009	Kitt Peak	Spacewatch	L4	6.9 km	MPC · JPL
665894	2009 UA_{155}	—	October 23, 2009	Mount Lemmon	Mount Lemmon Survey	L4	6.2 km	MPC · JPL
665895	2009 UT_{156}	—	April 2, 2005	Kitt Peak	Spacewatch	·	620 m	MPC · JPL
665896	2009 UV_{159}	—	September 21, 2009	Kitt Peak	Spacewatch	·	2.7 km	MPC · JPL
665897	2009 UA_{160}	—	October 22, 2009	Mount Lemmon	Mount Lemmon Survey	EUN	880 m	MPC · JPL
665898	2009 US_{161}	—	October 22, 2009	Catalina	CSS	·	2.8 km	MPC · JPL
665899	2009 UY_{161}	—	September 29, 2009	Mount Lemmon	Mount Lemmon Survey	EOS	1.6 km	MPC · JPL
665900	2009 UK_{162}	—	March 1, 2011	Mount Lemmon	Mount Lemmon Survey	H	440 m	MPC · JPL

== 665901–666000 ==
back to top

Designation			Discovery			Properties		Ref
Permanent	Provisional	Named after	Date	Site	Discoverer(s)	Category	Diam.	Ref
665901	2009 UA_{163}	—	March 27, 2011	Mount Lemmon	Mount Lemmon Survey	·	660 m	MPC · JPL
665902	2009 UG_{163}	—	March 14, 2012	Mount Lemmon	Mount Lemmon Survey	·	2.9 km	MPC · JPL
665903	2009 UW_{163}	—	October 23, 2009	Mount Lemmon	Mount Lemmon Survey	·	670 m	MPC · JPL
665904	2009 UA_{164}	—	September 24, 1995	Kitt Peak	Spacewatch	·	860 m	MPC · JPL
665905	2009 UD_{164}	—	March 27, 2011	Mount Lemmon	Mount Lemmon Survey	·	530 m	MPC · JPL
665906	2009 UQ_{166}	—	October 17, 2009	Mount Lemmon	Mount Lemmon Survey	·	2.9 km	MPC · JPL
665907	2009 UU_{166}	—	March 13, 2011	Kitt Peak	Spacewatch	·	1.5 km	MPC · JPL
665908	2009 UD_{167}	—	September 25, 2009	Catalina	CSS	JUN	850 m	MPC · JPL
665909	2009 UA_{170}	—	December 5, 2010	Mount Lemmon	Mount Lemmon Survey	·	2.6 km	MPC · JPL
665910	2009 UN_{171}	—	August 28, 2016	Mount Lemmon	Mount Lemmon Survey	·	870 m	MPC · JPL
665911	2009 UZ_{171}	—	January 30, 2011	Haleakala	Pan-STARRS 1	·	1.3 km	MPC · JPL
665912	2009 UM_{174}	—	October 27, 2009	Mount Lemmon	Mount Lemmon Survey	·	530 m	MPC · JPL
665913	2009 UK_{175}	—	October 26, 2009	Kitt Peak	Spacewatch	·	1.7 km	MPC · JPL
665914	2009 UA_{176}	—	October 26, 2009	Kitt Peak	Spacewatch	HNS	970 m	MPC · JPL
665915	2009 UP_{176}	—	October 22, 2009	Mount Lemmon	Mount Lemmon Survey	·	1.4 km	MPC · JPL
665916	2009 UQ_{176}	—	October 24, 2009	Kitt Peak	Spacewatch	VER	2.4 km	MPC · JPL
665917	2009 UR_{176}	—	October 18, 2009	Mount Lemmon	Mount Lemmon Survey	·	2.1 km	MPC · JPL
665918	2009 US_{176}	—	October 26, 2009	Mount Lemmon	Mount Lemmon Survey	·	1.3 km	MPC · JPL
665919	2009 UK_{179}	—	October 23, 2009	Mount Lemmon	Mount Lemmon Survey	L4	7.5 km	MPC · JPL
665920	2009 UO_{179}	—	October 18, 2009	Mount Lemmon	Mount Lemmon Survey	L4	7.2 km	MPC · JPL
665921	2009 UZ_{183}	—	October 23, 2009	Mount Lemmon	Mount Lemmon Survey	L4	6.8 km	MPC · JPL
665922	2009 UB_{186}	—	October 27, 2009	Kitt Peak	Spacewatch	ADE	1.7 km	MPC · JPL
665923	2009 UR_{192}	—	September 21, 2009	Mount Bigelow	CSS	·	570 m	MPC · JPL
665924	2009 UJ_{193}	—	October 24, 2009	Kitt Peak	Spacewatch	·	1.5 km	MPC · JPL
665925	2009 VM_{9}	—	November 8, 2009	Mount Lemmon	Mount Lemmon Survey	·	660 m	MPC · JPL
665926	2009 VV_{10}	—	October 26, 2009	Kitt Peak	Spacewatch	PHO · slow	950 m	MPC · JPL
665927	2009 VR_{11}	—	November 8, 2009	Mount Lemmon	Mount Lemmon Survey	L4	5.7 km	MPC · JPL
665928	2009 VW_{12}	—	November 8, 2009	Mount Lemmon	Mount Lemmon Survey	·	560 m	MPC · JPL
665929	2009 VC_{13}	—	November 8, 2009	Mount Lemmon	Mount Lemmon Survey	·	1.3 km	MPC · JPL
665930	2009 VW_{13}	—	November 8, 2009	Mount Lemmon	Mount Lemmon Survey	VER	2.0 km	MPC · JPL
665931	2009 VM_{15}	—	September 18, 2009	Mount Lemmon	Mount Lemmon Survey	·	2.2 km	MPC · JPL
665932	2009 VT_{15}	—	May 1, 2003	Kitt Peak	Spacewatch	·	2.2 km	MPC · JPL
665933	2009 VW_{15}	—	January 4, 2003	Kitt Peak	Spacewatch	NYS	1 km	MPC · JPL
665934	2009 VL_{19}	—	August 8, 2008	Siding Spring	SSS	THB	2.7 km	MPC · JPL
665935	2009 VN_{19}	—	November 9, 2009	Mount Lemmon	Mount Lemmon Survey	·	1.2 km	MPC · JPL
665936	2009 VR_{20}	—	November 9, 2009	Mount Lemmon	Mount Lemmon Survey	·	690 m	MPC · JPL
665937	2009 VJ_{21}	—	November 22, 2005	Kitt Peak	Spacewatch	·	800 m	MPC · JPL
665938	2009 VB_{22}	—	October 30, 2009	La Sagra	OAM	·	910 m	MPC · JPL
665939	2009 VF_{23}	—	October 21, 2009	Mount Lemmon	Mount Lemmon Survey	·	1.3 km	MPC · JPL
665940	2009 VK_{25}	—	November 10, 2009	Dauban	C. Rinner, Kugel, F.	EOS	1.8 km	MPC · JPL
665941	2009 VP_{25}	—	October 12, 2009	Mount Lemmon	Mount Lemmon Survey	·	1.2 km	MPC · JPL
665942	2009 VV_{25}	—	November 10, 2009	La Sagra	OAM	H	470 m	MPC · JPL
665943	2009 VQ_{27}	—	November 8, 2009	Mount Lemmon	Mount Lemmon Survey	·	980 m	MPC · JPL
665944	2009 VR_{28}	—	October 18, 2009	Mount Lemmon	Mount Lemmon Survey	·	620 m	MPC · JPL
665945	2009 VV_{29}	—	November 9, 2009	Catalina	CSS	L4	6.3 km	MPC · JPL
665946	2009 VM_{36}	—	November 10, 2009	Mount Lemmon	Mount Lemmon Survey	·	2.1 km	MPC · JPL
665947	2009 VY_{36}	—	October 24, 2009	Kitt Peak	Spacewatch	·	1.2 km	MPC · JPL
665948	2009 VU_{38}	—	October 26, 2009	Kitt Peak	Spacewatch	·	3.1 km	MPC · JPL
665949	2009 VX_{39}	—	October 14, 2009	Mount Lemmon	Mount Lemmon Survey	BAR	990 m	MPC · JPL
665950	2009 VO_{41}	—	November 9, 2009	Catalina	CSS	(5)	910 m	MPC · JPL
665951	2009 VF_{47}	—	September 28, 2009	Mount Lemmon	Mount Lemmon Survey	·	560 m	MPC · JPL
665952	2009 VQ_{47}	—	November 9, 2009	Mount Lemmon	Mount Lemmon Survey	·	1.4 km	MPC · JPL
665953	2009 VS_{47}	—	November 1, 2005	Mount Lemmon	Mount Lemmon Survey	·	600 m	MPC · JPL
665954	2009 VE_{48}	—	November 9, 2009	Mount Lemmon	Mount Lemmon Survey	·	2.3 km	MPC · JPL
665955	2009 VJ_{50}	—	September 28, 2009	Mount Lemmon	Mount Lemmon Survey	EUN	1.1 km	MPC · JPL
665956	2009 VP_{51}	—	November 10, 2009	Calvin-Rehoboth	L. A. Molnar	PHO	730 m	MPC · JPL
665957	2009 VG_{52}	—	October 24, 2009	Kitt Peak	Spacewatch	L4	6.5 km	MPC · JPL
665958	2009 VB_{55}	—	October 1, 2009	Mount Lemmon	Mount Lemmon Survey	·	1.8 km	MPC · JPL
665959	2009 VZ_{55}	—	September 21, 2009	Kitt Peak	Spacewatch	·	550 m	MPC · JPL
665960	2009 VH_{58}	—	March 3, 2006	Kitt Peak	Spacewatch	·	1.9 km	MPC · JPL
665961	2009 VF_{63}	—	November 8, 2009	Kitt Peak	Spacewatch	·	3.6 km	MPC · JPL
665962	2009 VS_{70}	—	November 9, 2009	Mount Lemmon	Mount Lemmon Survey	·	810 m	MPC · JPL
665963	2009 VB_{75}	—	October 25, 2009	Kitt Peak	Spacewatch	·	2.8 km	MPC · JPL
665964	2009 VR_{77}	—	November 9, 2009	Catalina	CSS	H	680 m	MPC · JPL
665965	2009 VG_{79}	—	October 13, 2009	La Sagra	OAM	TIR	2.9 km	MPC · JPL
665966	2009 VY_{83}	—	November 9, 2009	Kitt Peak	Spacewatch	·	680 m	MPC · JPL
665967	2009 VC_{84}	—	November 9, 2009	Kitt Peak	Spacewatch	·	630 m	MPC · JPL
665968	2009 VX_{88}	—	October 18, 2009	Mount Lemmon	Mount Lemmon Survey	EOS	1.7 km	MPC · JPL
665969	2009 VN_{89}	—	November 11, 2009	Kitt Peak	Spacewatch	·	530 m	MPC · JPL
665970	2009 VC_{95}	—	September 20, 2009	Mount Lemmon	Mount Lemmon Survey	NYS	860 m	MPC · JPL
665971	2009 VC_{98}	—	November 9, 2009	Mount Lemmon	Mount Lemmon Survey	·	2.1 km	MPC · JPL
665972	2009 VA_{100}	—	September 19, 1998	Apache Point	SDSS	·	2.0 km	MPC · JPL
665973	2009 VO_{100}	—	November 10, 2009	Kitt Peak	Spacewatch	·	1.5 km	MPC · JPL
665974	2009 VU_{101}	—	March 4, 2000	Apache Point	SDSS	·	3.1 km	MPC · JPL
665975	2009 VP_{104}	—	November 8, 2009	Catalina	CSS	H	560 m	MPC · JPL
665976	2009 VC_{105}	—	November 20, 2004	Kitt Peak	Spacewatch	EOS	2.4 km	MPC · JPL
665977	2009 VW_{105}	—	October 23, 2009	Mount Lemmon	Mount Lemmon Survey	·	660 m	MPC · JPL
665978	2009 VN_{108}	—	November 9, 2009	Catalina	CSS	H	510 m	MPC · JPL
665979	2009 VW_{109}	—	October 28, 2009	La Sagra	OAM	·	1.6 km	MPC · JPL
665980	2009 VQ_{110}	—	December 30, 2005	Kitt Peak	Spacewatch	·	1.2 km	MPC · JPL
665981	2009 VN_{118}	—	December 21, 2000	Socorro	LINEAR	·	1.5 km	MPC · JPL
665982	2009 VB_{120}	—	April 24, 2008	Kitt Peak	Spacewatch	·	1.5 km	MPC · JPL
665983	2009 VL_{120}	—	November 11, 2009	Mount Lemmon	Mount Lemmon Survey	·	1.1 km	MPC · JPL
665984	2009 VG_{121}	—	November 10, 2009	Mount Lemmon	Mount Lemmon Survey	·	2.1 km	MPC · JPL
665985	2009 VQ_{122}	—	October 16, 2009	Mount Lemmon	Mount Lemmon Survey	·	450 m	MPC · JPL
665986	2009 VL_{123}	—	November 8, 2009	Mount Lemmon	Mount Lemmon Survey	·	1.3 km	MPC · JPL
665987	2009 VT_{130}	—	November 9, 2009	Kitt Peak	Spacewatch	·	1.3 km	MPC · JPL
665988	2009 VC_{133}	—	November 10, 2009	Kitt Peak	Spacewatch	·	1.2 km	MPC · JPL
665989	2009 WB_{3}	—	October 26, 2009	Kitt Peak	Spacewatch	·	590 m	MPC · JPL
665990	2009 WO_{7}	—	November 19, 2009	Nazaret	Muler, G.	·	1.6 km	MPC · JPL
665991	2009 WF_{9}	—	November 19, 2009	La Sagra	OAM	PHO	890 m	MPC · JPL
665992	2009 WX_{11}	—	August 31, 2005	Kitt Peak	Spacewatch	·	1.2 km	MPC · JPL
665993	2009 WB_{13}	—	November 16, 2009	Mount Lemmon	Mount Lemmon Survey	·	1.7 km	MPC · JPL
665994	2009 WT_{14}	—	May 24, 2006	Kitt Peak	Spacewatch	·	3.4 km	MPC · JPL
665995	2009 WE_{15}	—	September 21, 2009	Mount Lemmon	Mount Lemmon Survey	·	1.1 km	MPC · JPL
665996	2009 WL_{16}	—	October 22, 2009	Mount Lemmon	Mount Lemmon Survey	·	970 m	MPC · JPL
665997	2009 WD_{17}	—	September 16, 2003	Kitt Peak	Spacewatch	EOS	2.0 km	MPC · JPL
665998	2009 WB_{18}	—	November 17, 2009	Mount Lemmon	Mount Lemmon Survey	·	1.3 km	MPC · JPL
665999	2009 WN_{20}	—	November 17, 2009	Mount Lemmon	Mount Lemmon Survey	·	1.7 km	MPC · JPL
666000	2009 WS_{24}	—	September 21, 2009	Mount Lemmon	Mount Lemmon Survey	·	2.8 km	MPC · JPL

back to top

== Meaning of names ==
As minor planet discoveries are confirmed, they are given a permanent number by the IAU's Minor Planet Center (MPC), and the discoverers can then submit names for them, following the IAU's naming conventions. The list below concerns those minor planets in the specified number-range that have received names, and explains the meanings of those names.

Official naming citations of newly named small Solar System bodies are approved and published in a bulletin by IAU's Working Group for Small Bodies Nomenclature (WGSBN). Before May 2021, citations were published in MPC's Minor Planet Circulars for many decades. Recent citations can also be found on the JPL Small-Body Database (SBDB). Until his death in 2016, German astronomer Lutz D. Schmadel compiled these citations into the Dictionary of Minor Planet Names (DMP) and regularly updated the collection.

Based on Paul Herget's The Names of the Minor Planets, Schmadel also researched the unclear origin of numerous asteroids, most of which had been named prior to World War II. This article incorporates text from this source, which is in the public domain: SBDB New namings may only be added to this list below after official publication as the preannouncement of names is condemned. The WGSBN publishes a comprehensive guideline for the naming rules of non-cometary small Solar System bodies.

Named minor planet	Provisional	This minor planet was named for...	Ref · Catalog
665079 Tym	2008 XA_{58}	Stanisław Aleksy Tym (1937–2024), Polish theater, television and film actor, satirist, director and screenwriter.	IAU · 665079
665583 Nikiforov	2009 SB_{14}	Andrey Nikiforov, Russian educator, amateur astronomer, and lecturer at the Grand Novosibirsk Planetarium.	IAU · 665583
