= List of minor planets: 838001–839000 =

The following is a partial list of minor planets, running from minor-planet number 838001 through 839000, inclusive. The primary data for this and other partial lists is based on JPL's "Small-Body Orbital Elements" and data available from the Minor Planet Center. Critical list information is also provided by the MPC, unless otherwise specified from Lowell Observatory. A detailed description of the table's columns and additional sources are given on the main page including a complete list of every page in this series, and a statistical break-up on the dynamical classification of minor planets.

Also see the summary list of all named bodies in numerical and alphabetical order, and the corresponding naming citations for the number range of this particular list. New namings may only be added to this list after official publication, as the preannouncement of names is condemned by the Working Group for Small Bodies Nomenclature of the International Astronomical Union.

Near-Earth obj.	MBA (inner)	MBA (outer)	Centaur
Mars-crosser	MBA (middle)	Jupiter trojan	Trans-Neptunian obj.
Unclassified

== 838001–838100 ==
Designation			Discovery			Properties		Ref
Permanent	Provisional	Named after	Date	Site	Discoverer(s)	Category	Diam.	Ref
838001	2013 XZ_{31}	—	December 6, 2013	Haleakala	Pan-STARRS 1	EUN	880 m	MPC · JPL
838002	2013 XA_{33}	—	March 17, 2018	Haleakala	Pan-STARRS 1	·	600 m	MPC · JPL
838003	2013 XH_{35}	—	November 11, 2001	Sacramento Peak	SDSS	·	2.6 km	MPC · JPL
838004	2013 XM_{35}	—	December 14, 2013	Mount Lemmon	Mount Lemmon Survey	(5)	1.0 km	MPC · JPL
838005	2013 XD_{36}	—	December 12, 2013	Haleakala	Pan-STARRS 1	HNS	880 m	MPC · JPL
838006	2013 XU_{39}	—	December 3, 2013	Haleakala	Pan-STARRS 1	·	1.2 km	MPC · JPL
838007	2013 XK_{41}	—	December 11, 2013	Haleakala	Pan-STARRS 1	·	1.2 km	MPC · JPL
838008	2013 XR_{42}	—	December 10, 2013	Mount Lemmon	Mount Lemmon Survey	NYS	600 m	MPC · JPL
838009	2013 XT_{42}	—	December 6, 2013	Haleakala	Pan-STARRS 1	·	1.6 km	MPC · JPL
838010	2013 YO	—	October 14, 2001	Sacramento Peak	SDSS	·	2.2 km	MPC · JPL
838011	2013 YF_{6}	—	December 11, 2013	Haleakala	Pan-STARRS 1	·	690 m	MPC · JPL
838012	2013 YB_{7}	—	November 28, 2013	Mount Lemmon	Mount Lemmon Survey	EUN	1.2 km	MPC · JPL
838013	2013 YS_{7}	—	November 28, 2013	Mount Lemmon	Mount Lemmon Survey	·	860 m	MPC · JPL
838014	2013 YG_{8}	—	October 29, 2002	Sacramento Peak	SDSS	·	1.9 km	MPC · JPL
838015	2013 YG_{10}	—	February 11, 2010	Siding Spring	SSS	·	1.7 km	MPC · JPL
838016	2013 YL_{13}	—	October 5, 2002	Sacramento Peak	SDSS	NYS	760 m	MPC · JPL
838017	2013 YW_{13}	—	November 28, 2013	Mount Lemmon	Mount Lemmon Survey	·	1.1 km	MPC · JPL
838018	2013 YM_{17}	—	December 14, 2013	Mount Lemmon	Mount Lemmon Survey	·	1.5 km	MPC · JPL
838019	2013 YP_{17}	—	January 12, 2010	Mount Lemmon	Mount Lemmon Survey	(5)	750 m	MPC · JPL
838020	2013 YX_{25}	—	March 9, 2010	WISE	WISE	T_{j} (2.98) · EUP	3.3 km	MPC · JPL
838021	2013 YX_{27}	—	December 10, 2013	Mount Lemmon	Mount Lemmon Survey	·	690 m	MPC · JPL
838022	2013 YE_{29}	—	March 20, 1999	Sacramento Peak	SDSS	·	1.1 km	MPC · JPL
838023	2013 YA_{31}	—	March 28, 2010	WISE	WISE	·	2.3 km	MPC · JPL
838024	2013 YZ_{33}	—	December 26, 2013	Mount Lemmon	Mount Lemmon Survey	JUN	670 m	MPC · JPL
838025	2013 YL_{34}	—	May 1, 2010	WISE	WISE	·	4.6 km	MPC · JPL
838026	2013 YS_{43}	—	October 4, 2002	Sacramento Peak	SDSS	EOS	1.8 km	MPC · JPL
838027	2013 YK_{45}	—	June 16, 2010	WISE	WISE	·	1.4 km	MPC · JPL
838028	2013 YX_{45}	—	December 27, 2013	Kitt Peak	Spacewatch	·	770 m	MPC · JPL
838029	2013 YT_{46}	—	September 19, 1998	Sacramento Peak	SDSS	·	1.9 km	MPC · JPL
838030	2013 YW_{51}	—	January 12, 1997	Mauna Kea	Veillet, C.	·	700 m	MPC · JPL
838031	2013 YP_{52}	—	January 25, 2010	WISE	WISE	·	2.2 km	MPC · JPL
838032	2013 YX_{56}	—	April 13, 2011	Kitt Peak	Spacewatch	·	700 m	MPC · JPL
838033	2013 YQ_{58}	—	January 25, 2010	Siding Spring	SSS	·	2.3 km	MPC · JPL
838034	2013 YM_{59}	—	December 4, 2013	Haleakala	Pan-STARRS 1	THB	2.3 km	MPC · JPL
838035	2013 YW_{62}	—	December 27, 2013	Kitt Peak	Spacewatch	·	1.4 km	MPC · JPL
838036	2013 YH_{63}	—	November 9, 2009	Mount Lemmon	Mount Lemmon Survey	·	1.7 km	MPC · JPL
838037	2013 YP_{69}	—	November 1, 2013	Mount Lemmon	Mount Lemmon Survey	·	1.6 km	MPC · JPL
838038	2013 YF_{70}	—	December 30, 2013	Mount Lemmon	Mount Lemmon Survey	·	1.3 km	MPC · JPL
838039	2013 YX_{73}	—	December 20, 2009	Mount Lemmon	Mount Lemmon Survey	·	1.1 km	MPC · JPL
838040	2013 YD_{74}	—	June 25, 2010	WISE	WISE	·	1.6 km	MPC · JPL
838041	2013 YA_{77}	—	October 1, 2008	Mount Lemmon	Mount Lemmon Survey	·	1.1 km	MPC · JPL
838042	2013 YN_{79}	—	April 20, 2010	Mount Lemmon	Mount Lemmon Survey	·	1.6 km	MPC · JPL
838043	2013 YG_{88}	—	August 13, 2012	Haleakala	Pan-STARRS 1	ADE	1.6 km	MPC · JPL
838044	2013 YJ_{92}	—	November 29, 2013	Haleakala	Pan-STARRS 1	·	860 m	MPC · JPL
838045	2013 YN_{93}	—	July 30, 2010	WISE	WISE	·	2.3 km	MPC · JPL
838046	2013 YQ_{95}	—	June 3, 2010	WISE	WISE	·	1.1 km	MPC · JPL
838047	2013 YF_{97}	—	April 9, 2010	WISE	WISE	·	3.2 km	MPC · JPL
838048	2013 YF_{100}	—	February 15, 2010	Catalina	CSS	ADE	1.9 km	MPC · JPL
838049	2013 YO_{104}	—	November 17, 2009	Mount Lemmon	Mount Lemmon Survey	·	1.0 km	MPC · JPL
838050	2013 YB_{109}	—	December 25, 2013	Mount Lemmon	Mount Lemmon Survey	·	940 m	MPC · JPL
838051	2013 YG_{109}	—	May 25, 2006	Mauna Kea	P. A. Wiegert	AGN	1.0 km	MPC · JPL
838052	2013 YP_{117}	—	September 23, 2008	Kitt Peak	Spacewatch	·	1 km	MPC · JPL
838053	2013 YZ_{117}	—	October 29, 2008	Kitt Peak	Spacewatch	DOR	1.8 km	MPC · JPL
838054	2013 YP_{120}	—	February 25, 2011	Mount Lemmon	Mount Lemmon Survey	·	390 m	MPC · JPL
838055	2013 YH_{131}	—	December 31, 2013	Mount Lemmon	Mount Lemmon Survey	HNS	900 m	MPC · JPL
838056	2013 YN_{133}	—	June 29, 2010	WISE	WISE	EOS	1.5 km	MPC · JPL
838057	2013 YD_{134}	—	April 20, 2010	Mount Lemmon	Mount Lemmon Survey	·	1.4 km	MPC · JPL
838058	2013 YK_{138}	—	December 6, 2013	Haleakala	Pan-STARRS 1	·	920 m	MPC · JPL
838059	2013 YS_{142}	—	December 31, 2013	Mount Lemmon	Mount Lemmon Survey	·	670 m	MPC · JPL
838060	2013 YA_{146}	—	December 31, 2013	Mount Lemmon	Mount Lemmon Survey	·	690 m	MPC · JPL
838061	2013 YP_{148}	—	December 31, 2013	Haleakala	Pan-STARRS 1	(1547)	1.4 km	MPC · JPL
838062	2013 YP_{154}	—	December 30, 2013	Mount Lemmon	Mount Lemmon Survey	·	1.4 km	MPC · JPL
838063	2013 YY_{155}	—	November 9, 2013	Mount Lemmon	Mount Lemmon Survey	(194)	1.5 km	MPC · JPL
838064	2013 YK_{156}	—	December 24, 2013	Mount Lemmon	Mount Lemmon Survey	(5)	990 m	MPC · JPL
838065	2013 YL_{156}	—	December 25, 2013	Mount Lemmon	Mount Lemmon Survey	·	1.2 km	MPC · JPL
838066	2013 YM_{156}	—	April 1, 2010	WISE	WISE	·	1.8 km	MPC · JPL
838067	2013 YN_{156}	—	April 10, 2010	WISE	WISE	·	3.2 km	MPC · JPL
838068	2013 YA_{157}	—	December 28, 2013	Kitt Peak	Spacewatch	·	500 m	MPC · JPL
838069	2013 YS_{157}	—	December 30, 2013	Kitt Peak	Spacewatch	·	1.3 km	MPC · JPL
838070	2013 YX_{159}	—	December 25, 2013	Mount Lemmon	Mount Lemmon Survey	EUN	820 m	MPC · JPL
838071	2013 YB_{160}	—	December 30, 2013	Haleakala	Pan-STARRS 1	EUN	730 m	MPC · JPL
838072	2013 YY_{162}	—	December 30, 2013	Mount Lemmon	Mount Lemmon Survey	·	960 m	MPC · JPL
838073	2013 YZ_{162}	—	December 25, 2013	Mount Lemmon	Mount Lemmon Survey	·	1.1 km	MPC · JPL
838074	2013 YR_{163}	—	December 30, 2013	Kitt Peak	Spacewatch	·	1.5 km	MPC · JPL
838075	2013 YU_{164}	—	December 28, 2013	Kitt Peak	Spacewatch	·	1.3 km	MPC · JPL
838076	2013 YL_{166}	—	December 30, 2013	Mount Lemmon	Mount Lemmon Survey	·	670 m	MPC · JPL
838077	2013 YE_{167}	—	December 28, 2013	Mayhill-ISON	L. Elenin	·	1.1 km	MPC · JPL
838078	2013 YY_{168}	—	December 30, 2013	Mount Lemmon	Mount Lemmon Survey	·	1.3 km	MPC · JPL
838079	2013 YZ_{168}	—	December 27, 2013	Mount Lemmon	Mount Lemmon Survey	·	970 m	MPC · JPL
838080	2013 YE_{169}	—	December 31, 2013	Mount Lemmon	Mount Lemmon Survey	·	1.2 km	MPC · JPL
838081	2013 YT_{170}	—	December 31, 2013	Kitt Peak	Spacewatch	·	780 m	MPC · JPL
838082	2013 YA_{171}	—	December 31, 2013	Kitt Peak	Spacewatch	·	1.2 km	MPC · JPL
838083	2013 YD_{171}	—	December 24, 2013	Mount Lemmon	Mount Lemmon Survey	PHO	900 m	MPC · JPL
838084	2014 AZ	—	September 22, 2012	Mount Lemmon	Mount Lemmon Survey	·	1.8 km	MPC · JPL
838085	2014 AR_{6}	—	September 28, 2009	Mount Lemmon	Mount Lemmon Survey	·	710 m	MPC · JPL
838086	2014 AW_{6}	—	January 1, 2014	Haleakala	Pan-STARRS 1	·	780 m	MPC · JPL
838087	2014 AS_{8}	—	January 1, 2014	Haleakala	Pan-STARRS 1	·	1.4 km	MPC · JPL
838088	2014 AM_{11}	—	January 1, 2014	Haleakala	Pan-STARRS 1	·	1.1 km	MPC · JPL
838089	2014 AQ_{18}	—	January 1, 2014	Haleakala	Pan-STARRS 1	·	680 m	MPC · JPL
838090	2014 AR_{19}	—	November 11, 2001	Sacramento Peak	SDSS	·	2.9 km	MPC · JPL
838091	2014 AG_{22}	—	January 3, 2014	Kitt Peak	Spacewatch	·	790 m	MPC · JPL
838092	2014 AN_{22}	—	May 19, 2010	WISE	WISE	·	2.0 km	MPC · JPL
838093	2014 AD_{24}	—	April 18, 2010	WISE	WISE	·	3.0 km	MPC · JPL
838094	2014 AS_{24}	—	January 6, 2010	Mount Lemmon	Mount Lemmon Survey	·	930 m	MPC · JPL
838095	2014 AY_{26}	—	September 21, 2008	Vicques	M. Ory	(1547)	1.3 km	MPC · JPL
838096	2014 AQ_{27}	—	January 4, 2014	Haleakala	Pan-STARRS 1	·	1.1 km	MPC · JPL
838097	2014 AX_{28}	—	January 4, 2014	Mount Lemmon	Mount Lemmon Survey	H	400 m	MPC · JPL
838098	2014 AX_{29}	—	June 7, 2010	WISE	WISE	·	1.2 km	MPC · JPL
838099	2014 AH_{30}	—	January 3, 2014	Mount Lemmon	Mount Lemmon Survey	·	910 m	MPC · JPL
838100	2014 AV_{32}	—	October 31, 2013	Mount Lemmon	Mount Lemmon Survey	·	1.4 km	MPC · JPL

== 838101–838200 ==
back to top

Designation			Discovery			Properties		Ref
Permanent	Provisional	Named after	Date	Site	Discoverer(s)	Category	Diam.	Ref
838101	2014 AU_{36}	—	January 2, 2014	Mount Lemmon	Mount Lemmon Survey	·	1.2 km	MPC · JPL
838102	2014 AE_{37}	—	April 19, 2010	WISE	WISE	·	2.1 km	MPC · JPL
838103	2014 AP_{37}	—	December 20, 2009	Mount Lemmon	Mount Lemmon Survey	·	1.4 km	MPC · JPL
838104	2014 AS_{38}	—	November 24, 2009	Mount Lemmon	Mount Lemmon Survey	·	710 m	MPC · JPL
838105	2014 AE_{40}	—	January 4, 2014	Kitt Peak	Spacewatch	H	320 m	MPC · JPL
838106	2014 AH_{45}	—	February 22, 2007	Kitt Peak	Spacewatch	·	680 m	MPC · JPL
838107	2014 AR_{47}	—	April 24, 2010	WISE	WISE	·	2.8 km	MPC · JPL
838108	2014 AT_{47}	—	January 1, 2014	Haleakala	Pan-STARRS 1	·	1.1 km	MPC · JPL
838109	2014 AF_{48}	—	March 2, 2010	WISE	WISE	·	3.7 km	MPC · JPL
838110	2014 AA_{49}	—	January 7, 2014	Kitt Peak	Spacewatch	·	1.1 km	MPC · JPL
838111	2014 AD_{51}	—	January 11, 2014	Mount Lemmon	Mount Lemmon Survey	T_{j} (2.99) · (895)	2.7 km	MPC · JPL
838112	2014 AV_{51}	—	January 11, 2014	Haleakala	Pan-STARRS 1	·	1.2 km	MPC · JPL
838113	2014 AO_{55}	—	April 18, 2015	Cerro Tololo	DECam	·	780 m	MPC · JPL
838114	2014 AM_{57}	—	January 4, 2014	Haleakala	Pan-STARRS 1	·	1.2 km	MPC · JPL
838115	2014 AR_{58}	—	August 26, 2012	Haleakala	Pan-STARRS 1	·	1.4 km	MPC · JPL
838116	2014 AD_{61}	—	January 1, 2014	Haleakala	Pan-STARRS 1	EOS	1.5 km	MPC · JPL
838117	2014 AB_{62}	—	January 5, 2014	Haleakala	Pan-STARRS 1	·	1.4 km	MPC · JPL
838118	2014 AR_{62}	—	January 7, 2014	Kitt Peak	Spacewatch	·	1.2 km	MPC · JPL
838119	2014 AX_{62}	—	January 13, 2014	Mount Lemmon	Mount Lemmon Survey	·	840 m	MPC · JPL
838120	2014 AF_{63}	—	January 5, 2014	Haleakala	Pan-STARRS 1	·	960 m	MPC · JPL
838121	2014 AP_{63}	—	January 2, 2014	Mount Lemmon	Mount Lemmon Survey	·	1.2 km	MPC · JPL
838122	2014 AR_{63}	—	January 10, 2014	Mount Lemmon	Mount Lemmon Survey	·	1.5 km	MPC · JPL
838123	2014 AD_{64}	—	February 20, 2010	WISE	WISE	ARM	3.0 km	MPC · JPL
838124	2014 AH_{65}	—	January 7, 2014	Kitt Peak	Spacewatch	·	460 m	MPC · JPL
838125	2014 AZ_{65}	—	November 25, 2017	Mount Lemmon	Mount Lemmon Survey	EUN	790 m	MPC · JPL
838126	2014 AL_{66}	—	January 1, 2014	Haleakala	Pan-STARRS 1	·	1.1 km	MPC · JPL
838127	2014 AN_{66}	—	April 14, 2010	Catalina	CSS	·	2.3 km	MPC · JPL
838128	2014 AU_{66}	—	January 7, 2014	Haleakala	Pan-STARRS 1	·	1.3 km	MPC · JPL
838129	2014 AN_{69}	—	January 2, 2014	Kitt Peak	Spacewatch	·	540 m	MPC · JPL
838130	2014 AP_{69}	—	January 9, 2014	Mount Lemmon	Mount Lemmon Survey	HYG	1.9 km	MPC · JPL
838131	2014 AA_{76}	—	January 11, 2014	Kitt Peak	Spacewatch	·	1.2 km	MPC · JPL
838132	2014 BE_{1}	—	January 12, 2014	Mount Lemmon	Mount Lemmon Survey	·	920 m	MPC · JPL
838133	2014 BN_{1}	—	January 7, 2014	Kitt Peak	Spacewatch	·	1.2 km	MPC · JPL
838134	2014 BQ_{3}	—	March 24, 1998	Haleakala	NEAT	T_{j} (2.93)	3.4 km	MPC · JPL
838135	2014 BW_{3}	—	November 15, 2009	Mount Lemmon	Mount Lemmon Survey	·	1.3 km	MPC · JPL
838136	2014 BG_{6}	—	April 10, 2010	WISE	WISE	·	2.7 km	MPC · JPL
838137	2014 BG_{8}	—	December 24, 2013	Catalina	CSS	BAR	1.1 km	MPC · JPL
838138	2014 BO_{9}	—	February 27, 2009	Kitt Peak	Spacewatch	H	320 m	MPC · JPL
838139	2014 BE_{11}	—	January 21, 2014	Kitt Peak	Spacewatch	·	920 m	MPC · JPL
838140	2014 BK_{16}	—	January 23, 2014	Mount Lemmon	Mount Lemmon Survey	·	880 m	MPC · JPL
838141	2014 BM_{21}	—	March 8, 2003	Palomar	NEAT	PHO	1.1 km	MPC · JPL
838142	2014 BD_{22}	—	January 23, 2014	Mount Lemmon	Mount Lemmon Survey	·	920 m	MPC · JPL
838143	2014 BB_{35}	—	January 18, 2010	WISE	WISE	PHO	1.8 km	MPC · JPL
838144	2014 BJ_{36}	—	February 25, 2007	Mount Lemmon	Mount Lemmon Survey	·	700 m	MPC · JPL
838145	2014 BA_{41}	—	July 22, 2010	WISE	WISE	·	1.1 km	MPC · JPL
838146	2014 BK_{47}	—	January 9, 2014	Mount Lemmon	Mount Lemmon Survey	·	1.5 km	MPC · JPL
838147	2014 BX_{48}	—	January 23, 2014	Mount Lemmon	Mount Lemmon Survey	·	1.2 km	MPC · JPL
838148	2014 BA_{52}	—	November 11, 2009	Kitt Peak	Spacewatch	·	830 m	MPC · JPL
838149	2014 BS_{53}	—	March 9, 2005	Mount Lemmon	Mount Lemmon Survey	·	1.5 km	MPC · JPL
838150	2014 BD_{58}	—	March 19, 2009	Catalina	CSS	·	2.6 km	MPC · JPL
838151	2014 BU_{58}	—	January 29, 2007	Kitt Peak	Spacewatch	·	590 m	MPC · JPL
838152	2014 BP_{60}	—	January 31, 2014	Haleakala	Pan-STARRS 1	H	400 m	MPC · JPL
838153	2014 BS_{62}	—	September 15, 2012	ESA OGS	ESA OGS	·	1.3 km	MPC · JPL
838154	2014 BF_{64}	—	January 29, 2014	Kitt Peak	Spacewatch	·	630 m	MPC · JPL
838155	2014 BN_{65}	—	March 4, 2005	Mount Lemmon	Mount Lemmon Survey	·	1.2 km	MPC · JPL
838156	2014 BD_{73}	—	January 28, 2014	Kitt Peak	Spacewatch	·	540 m	MPC · JPL
838157	2014 BV_{73}	—	December 14, 2017	Mount Lemmon	Mount Lemmon Survey	HNS	860 m	MPC · JPL
838158	2014 BM_{74}	—	January 28, 2014	Kitt Peak	Spacewatch	·	1.2 km	MPC · JPL
838159	2014 BU_{74}	—	January 21, 2014	Mount Lemmon	Mount Lemmon Survey	·	1.2 km	MPC · JPL
838160	2014 BH_{75}	—	January 25, 2014	Haleakala	Pan-STARRS 1	MRX	810 m	MPC · JPL
838161	2014 BT_{75}	—	April 21, 2010	WISE	WISE	EUP	2.7 km	MPC · JPL
838162	2014 BA_{76}	—	September 30, 2017	Mount Lemmon	Mount Lemmon Survey	·	2.0 km	MPC · JPL
838163	2014 BB_{76}	—	January 25, 2014	Haleakala	Pan-STARRS 1	·	430 m	MPC · JPL
838164	2014 BU_{78}	—	January 26, 2014	Haleakala	Pan-STARRS 1	·	1.3 km	MPC · JPL
838165	2014 BD_{82}	—	January 24, 2014	Haleakala	Pan-STARRS 1	·	1.7 km	MPC · JPL
838166	2014 BG_{82}	—	January 22, 2014	XuYi	PMO NEO Survey Program	·	790 m	MPC · JPL
838167	2014 BN_{82}	—	January 29, 2014	Kitt Peak	Spacewatch	V	400 m	MPC · JPL
838168	2014 BF_{85}	—	January 24, 2014	Haleakala	Pan-STARRS 1	·	2.0 km	MPC · JPL
838169	2014 BT_{85}	—	January 21, 2014	Mount Lemmon	Mount Lemmon Survey	·	1.2 km	MPC · JPL
838170	2014 BR_{86}	—	January 24, 2014	Haleakala	Pan-STARRS 1	·	1.4 km	MPC · JPL
838171	2014 BT_{86}	—	January 25, 2014	Haleakala	Pan-STARRS 1	·	1.3 km	MPC · JPL
838172	2014 BY_{86}	—	January 25, 2014	Haleakala	Pan-STARRS 1	AST	1.3 km	MPC · JPL
838173	2014 BC_{87}	—	January 28, 2014	Kitt Peak	Spacewatch	·	1.4 km	MPC · JPL
838174	2014 BU_{88}	—	January 24, 2014	Haleakala	Pan-STARRS 1	NEM	1.5 km	MPC · JPL
838175	2014 BA_{93}	—	January 24, 2014	Haleakala	Pan-STARRS 1	·	1.6 km	MPC · JPL
838176	2014 CZ_{5}	—	May 2, 2010	WISE	WISE	·	3.5 km	MPC · JPL
838177	2014 CR_{8}	—	February 8, 2014	Mount Lemmon	Mount Lemmon Survey	·	1.9 km	MPC · JPL
838178	2014 CP_{10}	—	January 28, 2014	Mount Lemmon	Mount Lemmon Survey	·	1.9 km	MPC · JPL
838179	2014 CD_{11}	—	March 21, 1999	Sacramento Peak	SDSS	EOS	2.0 km	MPC · JPL
838180	2014 CM_{11}	—	March 19, 2010	Westfield	International Astronomical Search Collaboration	·	1.1 km	MPC · JPL
838181	2014 CF_{14}	—	February 7, 2014	WISE	WISE	APO +1km	820 m	MPC · JPL
838182	2014 CL_{16}	—	November 12, 2001	Sacramento Peak	SDSS	·	3.0 km	MPC · JPL
838183	2014 CP_{26}	—	December 28, 2005	Kitt Peak	Spacewatch	·	1.0 km	MPC · JPL
838184	2014 CD_{28}	—	February 10, 2014	Mount Lemmon	Mount Lemmon Survey	·	1.1 km	MPC · JPL
838185	2014 CX_{28}	—	January 21, 2010	WISE	WISE	EUN	900 m	MPC · JPL
838186	2014 CL_{29}	—	February 11, 2014	Mount Lemmon	Mount Lemmon Survey	·	1.4 km	MPC · JPL
838187	2014 CK_{32}	—	February 5, 2014	Kitt Peak	Spacewatch	·	1 km	MPC · JPL
838188	2014 CH_{35}	—	February 10, 2014	Mount Lemmon	Mount Lemmon Survey	·	1.1 km	MPC · JPL
838189	2014 DL	—	January 23, 2006	Kitt Peak	Spacewatch	H	370 m	MPC · JPL
838190	2014 DR_{2}	—	October 20, 2009	Siding Spring	SSS	·	1.0 km	MPC · JPL
838191	2014 DA_{4}	—	January 13, 2010	WISE	WISE	·	1.5 km	MPC · JPL
838192	2014 DE_{5}	—	June 11, 2010	WISE	WISE	·	2.0 km	MPC · JPL
838193	2014 DZ_{5}	—	January 7, 2014	Mount Lemmon	Mount Lemmon Survey	·	1.4 km	MPC · JPL
838194	2014 DE_{8}	—	May 14, 2010	WISE	WISE	EUP	3.4 km	MPC · JPL
838195	2014 DR_{9}	—	November 18, 2009	Kitt Peak	Spacewatch	ERI	1.6 km	MPC · JPL
838196	2014 DS_{10}	—	June 5, 2010	WISE	WISE	·	1.1 km	MPC · JPL
838197	2014 DT_{12}	—	February 20, 2014	Haleakala	Pan-STARRS 1	·	1.6 km	MPC · JPL
838198	2014 DY_{15}	—	January 26, 2010	WISE	WISE	·	1.1 km	MPC · JPL
838199	2014 DF_{17}	—	February 22, 2014	Mount Lemmon	Mount Lemmon Survey	·	1.0 km	MPC · JPL
838200	2014 DO_{19}	—	February 9, 2014	Kitt Peak	Spacewatch	·	1.3 km	MPC · JPL

== 838201–838300 ==
back to top

Designation			Discovery			Properties		Ref
Permanent	Provisional	Named after	Date	Site	Discoverer(s)	Category	Diam.	Ref
838201	2014 DX_{19}	—	February 10, 2014	Haleakala	Pan-STARRS 1	·	1.3 km	MPC · JPL
838202	2014 DN_{21}	—	March 21, 1993	La Silla	UESAC	·	1.9 km	MPC · JPL
838203	2014 DG_{25}	—	February 20, 2014	Mount Lemmon	Mount Lemmon Survey	·	1.2 km	MPC · JPL
838204	2014 DN_{25}	—	September 29, 2005	Mount Lemmon	Mount Lemmon Survey	·	770 m	MPC · JPL
838205	2014 DD_{27}	—	January 29, 2014	Kitt Peak	Spacewatch	·	1.3 km	MPC · JPL
838206	2014 DB_{30}	—	February 10, 2014	Haleakala	Pan-STARRS 1	·	1.3 km	MPC · JPL
838207	2014 DY_{30}	—	February 10, 2014	Haleakala	Pan-STARRS 1	·	1.1 km	MPC · JPL
838208	2014 DJ_{31}	—	March 26, 2007	Mount Lemmon	Mount Lemmon Survey	PHO	890 m	MPC · JPL
838209	2014 DR_{31}	—	February 20, 2014	Mount Lemmon	Mount Lemmon Survey	·	1.4 km	MPC · JPL
838210	2014 DN_{32}	—	March 26, 2003	Wrightwood	J. W. Young	·	1.5 km	MPC · JPL
838211	2014 DP_{32}	—	February 21, 2014	Kitt Peak	Spacewatch	·	1.5 km	MPC · JPL
838212	2014 DE_{35}	—	February 8, 2014	Mount Lemmon	Mount Lemmon Survey	H	330 m	MPC · JPL
838213	2014 DC_{42}	—	February 25, 2014	Kitt Peak	Spacewatch	·	900 m	MPC · JPL
838214	2014 DM_{43}	—	February 26, 2014	Kitt Peak	Spacewatch	NYS	820 m	MPC · JPL
838215	2014 DC_{51}	—	March 20, 1999	Sacramento Peak	SDSS	·	1.6 km	MPC · JPL
838216	2014 DM_{51}	—	December 18, 2009	Kitt Peak	Spacewatch	·	810 m	MPC · JPL
838217	2014 DX_{51}	—	September 16, 2009	Kitt Peak	Spacewatch	·	580 m	MPC · JPL
838218	2014 DD_{61}	—	February 26, 2014	Haleakala	Pan-STARRS 1	KOR	1.1 km	MPC · JPL
838219	2014 DX_{63}	—	February 26, 2014	Haleakala	Pan-STARRS 1	·	1.2 km	MPC · JPL
838220	2014 DY_{63}	—	February 2, 2009	Kitt Peak	Spacewatch	·	1.5 km	MPC · JPL
838221	2014 DX_{65}	—	February 22, 2009	Kitt Peak	Spacewatch	·	1.2 km	MPC · JPL
838222	2014 DY_{73}	—	April 2, 2009	Mount Lemmon	Mount Lemmon Survey	·	1.8 km	MPC · JPL
838223	2014 DT_{76}	—	February 26, 2014	Haleakala	Pan-STARRS 1	V	440 m	MPC · JPL
838224	2014 DX_{78}	—	February 26, 2014	Haleakala	Pan-STARRS 1	·	770 m	MPC · JPL
838225	2014 DZ_{78}	—	February 26, 2014	Haleakala	Pan-STARRS 1	·	680 m	MPC · JPL
838226	2014 DX_{79}	—	February 26, 2014	Haleakala	Pan-STARRS 1	·	1.4 km	MPC · JPL
838227	2014 DZ_{80}	—	October 29, 2008	Kitt Peak	Spacewatch	·	1.2 km	MPC · JPL
838228	2014 DG_{81}	—	February 22, 2014	Kitt Peak	Spacewatch	AGN	1.0 km	MPC · JPL
838229	2014 DC_{82}	—	March 22, 2009	Mount Lemmon	Mount Lemmon Survey	·	1.9 km	MPC · JPL
838230	2014 DQ_{85}	—	March 23, 2006	Kitt Peak	Spacewatch	·	930 m	MPC · JPL
838231	2014 DK_{87}	—	February 9, 2014	Haleakala	Pan-STARRS 1	L4	6.6 km	MPC · JPL
838232	2014 DV_{90}	—	February 26, 2014	Haleakala	Pan-STARRS 1	L4	5.2 km	MPC · JPL
838233	2014 DH_{92}	—	February 26, 2014	Mount Lemmon	Mount Lemmon Survey	·	1.3 km	MPC · JPL
838234	2014 DS_{93}	—	February 26, 2014	Haleakala	Pan-STARRS 1	·	750 m	MPC · JPL
838235	2014 DM_{94}	—	February 26, 2014	Haleakala	Pan-STARRS 1	·	1.4 km	MPC · JPL
838236	2014 DT_{99}	—	January 25, 2014	Haleakala	Pan-STARRS 1	·	1.3 km	MPC · JPL
838237	2014 DU_{99}	—	February 6, 2014	Mount Lemmon	Mount Lemmon Survey	V	460 m	MPC · JPL
838238	2014 DE_{100}	—	May 9, 2010	WISE	WISE	EUP	2.9 km	MPC · JPL
838239	2014 DQ_{101}	—	February 27, 2014	Mount Lemmon	Mount Lemmon Survey	·	1.3 km	MPC · JPL
838240	2014 DY_{103}	—	February 27, 2014	Mount Lemmon	Mount Lemmon Survey	·	740 m	MPC · JPL
838241	2014 DX_{105}	—	October 1, 2000	Sacramento Peak	SDSS	·	3.3 km	MPC · JPL
838242	2014 DV_{114}	—	March 5, 2002	Sacramento Peak	SDSS	L4	8.7 km	MPC · JPL
838243	2014 DY_{114}	—	January 10, 2019	Haleakala	Pan-STARRS 1	EOS	1.4 km	MPC · JPL
838244	2014 DP_{115}	—	February 26, 2014	Haleakala	Pan-STARRS 1	·	1.3 km	MPC · JPL
838245	2014 DV_{117}	—	January 11, 2010	Kitt Peak	Spacewatch	NYS	780 m	MPC · JPL
838246	2014 DM_{128}	—	February 28, 2014	Haleakala	Pan-STARRS 1	GEF	920 m	MPC · JPL
838247	2014 DQ_{131}	—	February 28, 2014	Haleakala	Pan-STARRS 1	·	650 m	MPC · JPL
838248	2014 DV_{135}	—	February 28, 2014	Haleakala	Pan-STARRS 1	·	1.5 km	MPC · JPL
838249	2014 DF_{136}	—	February 10, 2010	Kitt Peak	Spacewatch	·	1.6 km	MPC · JPL
838250	2014 DX_{144}	—	February 26, 2014	Haleakala	Pan-STARRS 1	·	1.7 km	MPC · JPL
838251	2014 DX_{145}	—	October 18, 2012	Haleakala	Pan-STARRS 1	·	1.3 km	MPC · JPL
838252	2014 DD_{146}	—	May 13, 2010	WISE	WISE	·	4.6 km	MPC · JPL
838253	2014 DW_{150}	—	April 26, 2001	Kitt Peak	Spacewatch	·	1.4 km	MPC · JPL
838254	2014 DM_{157}	—	February 26, 2014	Mount Lemmon	Mount Lemmon Survey	·	1.1 km	MPC · JPL
838255	2014 DQ_{157}	—	June 16, 2010	WISE	WISE	·	2.8 km	MPC · JPL
838256	2014 DZ_{157}	—	June 5, 2010	WISE	WISE	·	1.2 km	MPC · JPL
838257	2014 DA_{158}	—	February 26, 2014	Haleakala	Pan-STARRS 1	·	1.7 km	MPC · JPL
838258	2014 DX_{158}	—	December 10, 2006	Kitt Peak	Spacewatch	·	490 m	MPC · JPL
838259	2014 DG_{160}	—	January 29, 2010	WISE	WISE	L4	9.2 km	MPC · JPL
838260	2014 DO_{164}	—	February 26, 2014	Haleakala	Pan-STARRS 1	·	990 m	MPC · JPL
838261	2014 DJ_{166}	—	February 28, 2014	Haleakala	Pan-STARRS 1	BRA	940 m	MPC · JPL
838262	2014 DT_{166}	—	July 14, 2016	Haleakala	Pan-STARRS 1	·	2.2 km	MPC · JPL
838263	2014 DK_{168}	—	February 26, 2014	Haleakala	Pan-STARRS 1	·	1.4 km	MPC · JPL
838264	2014 DU_{169}	—	February 26, 2014	Haleakala	Pan-STARRS 1	·	2.3 km	MPC · JPL
838265	2014 DC_{173}	—	February 28, 2014	Haleakala	Pan-STARRS 1	·	1.6 km	MPC · JPL
838266	2014 DU_{174}	—	February 28, 2014	Haleakala	Pan-STARRS 1	L4	6.2 km	MPC · JPL
838267	2014 DH_{178}	—	February 26, 2014	Haleakala	Pan-STARRS 1	·	2.0 km	MPC · JPL
838268	2014 DN_{179}	—	February 26, 2014	Haleakala	Pan-STARRS 1	·	1.3 km	MPC · JPL
838269	2014 DP_{179}	—	February 28, 2014	Haleakala	Pan-STARRS 1	MAS	520 m	MPC · JPL
838270	2014 DS_{179}	—	February 22, 2014	Mount Lemmon	Mount Lemmon Survey	·	960 m	MPC · JPL
838271	2014 DQ_{182}	—	February 26, 2014	Haleakala	Pan-STARRS 1	·	560 m	MPC · JPL
838272	2014 DL_{183}	—	February 26, 2014	Haleakala	Pan-STARRS 1	·	550 m	MPC · JPL
838273	2014 DB_{184}	—	February 28, 2014	Haleakala	Pan-STARRS 1	·	480 m	MPC · JPL
838274	2014 DN_{184}	—	February 26, 2014	Haleakala	Pan-STARRS 1	·	520 m	MPC · JPL
838275	2014 DL_{187}	—	February 28, 2014	Haleakala	Pan-STARRS 1	AST	1.2 km	MPC · JPL
838276	2014 DP_{189}	—	February 19, 2014	Mount Lemmon	Mount Lemmon Survey	·	1.4 km	MPC · JPL
838277	2014 DM_{190}	—	February 26, 2014	Haleakala	Pan-STARRS 1	·	1.4 km	MPC · JPL
838278	2014 DE_{191}	—	February 8, 2014	Mount Lemmon	Mount Lemmon Survey	MAS	520 m	MPC · JPL
838279	2014 DW_{192}	—	February 24, 2014	Haleakala	Pan-STARRS 1	BRA	1.1 km	MPC · JPL
838280	2014 DD_{193}	—	February 26, 2014	Haleakala	Pan-STARRS 1	·	940 m	MPC · JPL
838281	2014 DY_{195}	—	February 27, 2014	Haleakala	Pan-STARRS 1	·	1.5 km	MPC · JPL
838282	2014 DR_{211}	—	February 20, 2014	Mount Lemmon	Mount Lemmon Survey	·	970 m	MPC · JPL
838283	2014 DA_{214}	—	February 26, 2014	Haleakala	Pan-STARRS 1	·	2.1 km	MPC · JPL
838284	2014 EO	—	January 25, 2014	Haleakala	Pan-STARRS 1	H	380 m	MPC · JPL
838285	2014 EP	—	February 6, 2006	Kitt Peak	Spacewatch	H	400 m	MPC · JPL
838286	2014 EC_{2}	—	September 9, 2004	Socorro	LINEAR	·	1.2 km	MPC · JPL
838287	2014 ED_{5}	—	April 7, 2010	WISE	WISE	·	1.1 km	MPC · JPL
838288	2014 EE_{6}	—	March 12, 2005	Kitt Peak	Spacewatch	·	1.1 km	MPC · JPL
838289	2014 EU_{6}	—	July 3, 2010	WISE	WISE	·	1.0 km	MPC · JPL
838290	2014 EO_{8}	—	March 6, 2014	Mount Lemmon	Mount Lemmon Survey	H	320 m	MPC · JPL
838291	2014 EH_{14}	—	October 1, 2005	Kitt Peak	Spacewatch	·	740 m	MPC · JPL
838292	2014 EY_{20}	—	March 6, 2014	Mount Lemmon	Mount Lemmon Survey	ERI	950 m	MPC · JPL
838293	2014 EB_{22}	—	March 8, 2014	Kitt Peak	Spacewatch	·	2.6 km	MPC · JPL
838294	2014 EV_{23}	—	March 8, 2014	Kitt Peak	Spacewatch	·	950 m	MPC · JPL
838295	2014 EF_{29}	—	March 20, 1999	Sacramento Peak	SDSS	·	1.0 km	MPC · JPL
838296	2014 EP_{36}	—	February 19, 2010	WISE	WISE	PHO	650 m	MPC · JPL
838297	2014 EF_{40}	—	December 17, 2009	Mount Lemmon	Mount Lemmon Survey	·	2.1 km	MPC · JPL
838298	2014 EK_{43}	—	February 9, 2014	Haleakala	Pan-STARRS 1	·	810 m	MPC · JPL
838299	2014 EN_{44}	—	March 1, 2005	Kitt Peak	Spacewatch	JUN	810 m	MPC · JPL
838300	2014 EU_{63}	—	June 11, 2015	Haleakala	Pan-STARRS 1	KON	1.6 km	MPC · JPL

== 838301–838400 ==
back to top

Designation			Discovery			Properties		Ref
Permanent	Provisional	Named after	Date	Site	Discoverer(s)	Category	Diam.	Ref
838301	2014 EE_{64}	—	March 2, 2014	Cerro Tololo	High Cadence Transient Survey	L4	7.4 km	MPC · JPL
838302	2014 EX_{71}	—	February 28, 2014	Haleakala	Pan-STARRS 1	·	1.4 km	MPC · JPL
838303	2014 EZ_{76}	—	September 17, 2006	Kitt Peak	Spacewatch	·	480 m	MPC · JPL
838304	2014 EL_{79}	—	September 19, 2011	Haleakala	Pan-STARRS 1	·	1.7 km	MPC · JPL
838305	2014 ES_{84}	—	August 13, 2012	Kitt Peak	Spacewatch	·	540 m	MPC · JPL
838306	2014 EY_{85}	—	September 14, 2012	Mount Lemmon	Mount Lemmon Survey	·	1.2 km	MPC · JPL
838307	2014 EE_{88}	—	August 24, 2012	Kitt Peak	Spacewatch	·	1.2 km	MPC · JPL
838308	2014 EE_{90}	—	March 2, 2014	Cerro Tololo	High Cadence Transient Survey	·	1.6 km	MPC · JPL
838309	2014 EA_{97}	—	February 28, 2014	Haleakala	Pan-STARRS 1	·	2.2 km	MPC · JPL
838310	2014 EC_{106}	—	January 10, 2013	Haleakala	Pan-STARRS 1	L4	5.4 km	MPC · JPL
838311	2014 EL_{112}	—	March 3, 2014	Cerro Tololo	High Cadence Transient Survey	H	270 m	MPC · JPL
838312	2014 EO_{118}	—	May 21, 2015	Cerro Tololo	DECam	·	1.3 km	MPC · JPL
838313	2014 EP_{120}	—	October 12, 2015	Haleakala	Pan-STARRS 1	·	910 m	MPC · JPL
838314	2014 EE_{121}	—	November 13, 2017	Haleakala	Pan-STARRS 1	·	2.1 km	MPC · JPL
838315	2014 EJ_{123}	—	July 17, 2002	Palomar	NEAT	·	1.2 km	MPC · JPL
838316	2014 EP_{128}	—	September 23, 2017	Haleakala	Pan-STARRS 1	·	2.2 km	MPC · JPL
838317	2014 EW_{130}	—	May 21, 2015	Haleakala	Pan-STARRS 1	EOS	1.2 km	MPC · JPL
838318	2014 EY_{134}	—	February 28, 2014	Haleakala	Pan-STARRS 1	·	1.2 km	MPC · JPL
838319	2014 EZ_{141}	—	October 22, 2012	Mount Lemmon	Mount Lemmon Survey	·	1.0 km	MPC · JPL
838320	2014 EX_{143}	—	February 28, 2014	Haleakala	Pan-STARRS 1	·	1.6 km	MPC · JPL
838321	2014 ER_{146}	—	October 11, 2012	Haleakala	Pan-STARRS 1	·	740 m	MPC · JPL
838322	2014 EH_{154}	—	October 20, 2012	Kitt Peak	Spacewatch	GEF	660 m	MPC · JPL
838323	2014 EB_{155}	—	August 29, 2016	Mount Lemmon	Mount Lemmon Survey	·	730 m	MPC · JPL
838324	2014 EO_{155}	—	July 25, 2015	Haleakala	Pan-STARRS 1	·	570 m	MPC · JPL
838325	2014 EP_{158}	—	February 28, 2014	Haleakala	Pan-STARRS 1	·	1.5 km	MPC · JPL
838326	2014 EJ_{161}	—	November 4, 2012	Mount Lemmon	Mount Lemmon Survey	·	1.6 km	MPC · JPL
838327	2014 EK_{164}	—	September 2, 2017	Haleakala	Pan-STARRS 1	·	2.0 km	MPC · JPL
838328	2014 ET_{165}	—	June 1, 2008	Mount Lemmon	Mount Lemmon Survey	(883)	550 m	MPC · JPL
838329	2014 EY_{175}	—	December 31, 2008	Kitt Peak	Spacewatch	·	1.9 km	MPC · JPL
838330	2014 EY_{180}	—	October 10, 2008	Mount Lemmon	Mount Lemmon Survey	V	470 m	MPC · JPL
838331	2014 ER_{185}	—	October 27, 2005	Kitt Peak	Spacewatch	·	650 m	MPC · JPL
838332	2014 EZ_{187}	—	February 28, 2014	Haleakala	Pan-STARRS 1	·	1.5 km	MPC · JPL
838333	2014 EG_{193}	—	March 4, 2014	Cerro Tololo	High Cadence Transient Survey	·	1.2 km	MPC · JPL
838334	2014 ET_{197}	—	March 4, 2014	Cerro Tololo	High Cadence Transient Survey	·	1.8 km	MPC · JPL
838335	2014 EG_{200}	—	February 28, 2014	Haleakala	Pan-STARRS 1	·	1.3 km	MPC · JPL
838336	2014 EE_{208}	—	August 5, 2005	Palomar	NEAT	·	1.9 km	MPC · JPL
838337	2014 EF_{210}	—	August 26, 2012	Haleakala	Pan-STARRS 1	JUN	890 m	MPC · JPL
838338	2014 EA_{212}	—	December 31, 2008	Mount Lemmon	Mount Lemmon Survey	GEF	880 m	MPC · JPL
838339	2014 ED_{213}	—	September 22, 2016	Mount Lemmon	Mount Lemmon Survey	AGN	850 m	MPC · JPL
838340	2014 EA_{214}	—	October 8, 2012	Haleakala	Pan-STARRS 1	·	1.3 km	MPC · JPL
838341	2014 EF_{223}	—	October 2, 2006	Mount Lemmon	Mount Lemmon Survey	·	1.8 km	MPC · JPL
838342	2014 EM_{236}	—	September 17, 2003	Kitt Peak	Spacewatch	·	950 m	MPC · JPL
838343	2014 EX_{236}	—	March 5, 2014	Cerro Tololo	High Cadence Transient Survey	EOS · critical	1.1 km	MPC · JPL
838344	2014 ED_{240}	—	March 5, 2014	Cerro Tololo	High Cadence Transient Survey	·	1.9 km	MPC · JPL
838345	2014 ER_{249}	—	November 13, 2012	Kitt Peak	Spacewatch	·	1.6 km	MPC · JPL
838346	2014 EE_{252}	—	March 11, 2014	Mount Lemmon	Mount Lemmon Survey	HOF	1.8 km	MPC · JPL
838347	2014 EF_{257}	—	March 11, 2014	Mount Lemmon	Mount Lemmon Survey	GEF	870 m	MPC · JPL
838348	2014 FQ_{7}	—	March 24, 2014	Haleakala	Pan-STARRS 1	H	370 m	MPC · JPL
838349	2014 FT_{11}	—	February 18, 2014	Mount Lemmon	Mount Lemmon Survey	·	960 m	MPC · JPL
838350	2014 FD_{12}	—	March 20, 2014	Mount Lemmon	Mount Lemmon Survey	H	370 m	MPC · JPL
838351	2014 FX_{21}	—	February 10, 2014	Haleakala	Pan-STARRS 1	H	460 m	MPC · JPL
838352	2014 FZ_{24}	—	March 23, 2014	Mount Lemmon	Mount Lemmon Survey	·	1.4 km	MPC · JPL
838353	2014 FK_{26}	—	February 28, 2014	Haleakala	Pan-STARRS 1	·	1.5 km	MPC · JPL
838354	2014 FE_{27}	—	October 23, 2012	Haleakala	Pan-STARRS 1	·	1.2 km	MPC · JPL
838355	2014 FA_{29}	—	March 23, 2014	Mount Lemmon	Mount Lemmon Survey	·	1.2 km	MPC · JPL
838356	2014 FZ_{32}	—	February 26, 2014	Haleakala	Pan-STARRS 1	H	320 m	MPC · JPL
838357	2014 FF_{33}	—	March 26, 2014	Mount Lemmon	Mount Lemmon Survey	·	600 m	MPC · JPL
838358	2014 FW_{38}	—	February 26, 2014	Haleakala	Pan-STARRS 1	MRX	770 m	MPC · JPL
838359	2014 FT_{40}	—	July 28, 2011	Haleakala	Pan-STARRS 1	PHO	680 m	MPC · JPL
838360	2014 FM_{42}	—	March 15, 2007	Mount Lemmon	Mount Lemmon Survey	·	730 m	MPC · JPL
838361	2014 FH_{44}	—	February 20, 2014	Mount Lemmon	Mount Lemmon Survey	·	900 m	MPC · JPL
838362	2014 FH_{46}	—	October 2, 2006	Mount Lemmon	Mount Lemmon Survey	·	1.5 km	MPC · JPL
838363	2014 FQ_{48}	—	April 25, 2010	WISE	WISE	·	1.1 km	MPC · JPL
838364	2014 FZ_{49}	—	January 11, 2014	Mount Lemmon	Mount Lemmon Survey	·	1.6 km	MPC · JPL
838365	2014 FC_{50}	—	May 3, 1997	La Silla	E. W. Elst	JUN	1.2 km	MPC · JPL
838366	2014 FF_{52}	—	June 19, 2010	WISE	WISE	·	2.2 km	MPC · JPL
838367	2014 FM_{63}	—	May 10, 2010	WISE	WISE	·	1.4 km	MPC · JPL
838368	2014 FF_{78}	—	March 28, 2014	Mount Lemmon	Mount Lemmon Survey	PHO	660 m	MPC · JPL
838369	2014 FT_{78}	—	March 12, 2003	Palomar	NEAT	·	2.1 km	MPC · JPL
838370	2014 FR_{80}	—	March 29, 2014	Mount Lemmon	Mount Lemmon Survey	TIN	620 m	MPC · JPL
838371	2014 FS_{80}	—	March 22, 2014	Mount Lemmon	Mount Lemmon Survey	·	1.4 km	MPC · JPL
838372	2014 FC_{81}	—	March 29, 2014	Kitt Peak	Spacewatch	·	1.0 km	MPC · JPL
838373	2014 FO_{82}	—	March 26, 2014	Mount Lemmon	Mount Lemmon Survey	·	2.3 km	MPC · JPL
838374	2014 FE_{84}	—	March 31, 2014	Kitt Peak	Spacewatch	MAS	570 m	MPC · JPL
838375	2014 FK_{84}	—	March 24, 2014	Haleakala	Pan-STARRS 1	T_{j} (2.98) · 3:2	4.3 km	MPC · JPL
838376	2014 FP_{89}	—	March 26, 2014	Mount Lemmon	Mount Lemmon Survey	EOS	1.2 km	MPC · JPL
838377	2014 FV_{90}	—	March 31, 2014	Mount Lemmon	Mount Lemmon Survey	·	740 m	MPC · JPL
838378	2014 FZ_{91}	—	March 24, 2014	Haleakala	Pan-STARRS 1	·	1.7 km	MPC · JPL
838379	2014 FP_{97}	—	March 31, 2014	Mount Lemmon	Mount Lemmon Survey	·	2.0 km	MPC · JPL
838380	2014 GD_{4}	—	September 26, 2011	Mount Lemmon	Mount Lemmon Survey	·	1.6 km	MPC · JPL
838381	2014 GZ_{5}	—	June 23, 2010	WISE	WISE	·	3.1 km	MPC · JPL
838382	2014 GD_{12}	—	May 1, 2011	Haleakala	Pan-STARRS 1	·	510 m	MPC · JPL
838383	2014 GK_{12}	—	March 20, 1999	Sacramento Peak	SDSS	·	950 m	MPC · JPL
838384	2014 GL_{14}	—	October 1, 2005	Mount Lemmon	Mount Lemmon Survey	·	2.0 km	MPC · JPL
838385	2014 GA_{15}	—	April 2, 2014	Mount Lemmon	Mount Lemmon Survey	·	560 m	MPC · JPL
838386	2014 GM_{18}	—	October 23, 2012	Mount Lemmon	Mount Lemmon Survey	·	820 m	MPC · JPL
838387	2014 GN_{24}	—	April 4, 2014	Mount Lemmon	Mount Lemmon Survey	·	1.1 km	MPC · JPL
838388	2014 GD_{28}	—	March 31, 2014	Kitt Peak	Spacewatch	·	1.5 km	MPC · JPL
838389	2014 GM_{31}	—	March 21, 1993	La Silla	UESAC	·	1.8 km	MPC · JPL
838390	2014 GC_{33}	—	March 28, 2014	Mount Lemmon	Mount Lemmon Survey	·	500 m	MPC · JPL
838391	2014 GL_{34}	—	April 5, 2014	Haleakala	Pan-STARRS 1	H	530 m	MPC · JPL
838392	2014 GW_{34}	—	April 5, 2014	Haleakala	Pan-STARRS 1	H	300 m	MPC · JPL
838393	2014 GH_{36}	—	March 8, 2014	Kitt Peak	Spacewatch	·	460 m	MPC · JPL
838394	2014 GM_{37}	—	March 24, 2014	Haleakala	Pan-STARRS 1	·	1.3 km	MPC · JPL
838395	2014 GB_{38}	—	September 26, 1998	Kleť	Kleť, Observatoř	·	840 m	MPC · JPL
838396	2014 GJ_{38}	—	April 8, 2010	Kitt Peak	Spacewatch	·	870 m	MPC · JPL
838397	2014 GW_{38}	—	March 20, 2010	WISE	WISE	·	780 m	MPC · JPL
838398	2014 GD_{40}	—	April 18, 2010	WISE	WISE	·	2.0 km	MPC · JPL
838399	2014 GR_{41}	—	September 26, 2011	Haleakala	Pan-STARRS 1	·	650 m	MPC · JPL
838400	2014 GB_{45}	—	February 27, 2010	WISE	WISE	·	1.7 km	MPC · JPL

== 838401–838500 ==
back to top

Designation			Discovery			Properties		Ref
Permanent	Provisional	Named after	Date	Site	Discoverer(s)	Category	Diam.	Ref
838401	2014 GE_{46}	—	February 27, 2014	Haleakala	Pan-STARRS 1	·	1.3 km	MPC · JPL
838402	2014 GZ_{46}	—	March 20, 1999	Sacramento Peak	SDSS	·	1.6 km	MPC · JPL
838403	2014 GZ_{49}	—	March 27, 2011	Mount Lemmon	Mount Lemmon Survey	·	860 m	MPC · JPL
838404 Dickson	2014 GK_{50}	Dickson	April 14, 1993	Kitt Peak	E. Schulman, C. V. Cox	·	1.9 km	MPC · JPL
838405	2014 GA_{51}	—	March 8, 2014	Nogales	M. Schwartz, P. R. Holvorcem	·	1.1 km	MPC · JPL
838406	2014 GF_{52}	—	April 9, 2014	Haleakala	Pan-STARRS 1	·	630 m	MPC · JPL
838407	2014 GX_{63}	—	April 5, 2014	Haleakala	Pan-STARRS 1	·	910 m	MPC · JPL
838408	2014 GL_{67}	—	April 8, 2014	Mount Lemmon	Mount Lemmon Survey	·	1.0 km	MPC · JPL
838409	2014 GZ_{68}	—	April 7, 2014	Mount Lemmon	Mount Lemmon Survey	V	480 m	MPC · JPL
838410	2014 GG_{71}	—	April 5, 2014	Haleakala	Pan-STARRS 1	·	980 m	MPC · JPL
838411	2014 GH_{72}	—	April 4, 2014	Haleakala	Pan-STARRS 1	·	1.4 km	MPC · JPL
838412	2014 GR_{72}	—	July 15, 2010	WISE	WISE	·	990 m	MPC · JPL
838413	2014 GX_{72}	—	March 1, 2010	WISE	WISE	PHO	750 m	MPC · JPL
838414	2014 GX_{77}	—	April 8, 2014	Haleakala	Pan-STARRS 1	·	2.2 km	MPC · JPL
838415	2014 GZ_{80}	—	April 4, 2014	Haleakala	Pan-STARRS 1	·	1.4 km	MPC · JPL
838416	2014 GS_{88}	—	September 24, 2011	Haleakala	Pan-STARRS 1	·	1.5 km	MPC · JPL
838417	2014 GE_{92}	—	April 5, 2014	Haleakala	Pan-STARRS 1	·	1.1 km	MPC · JPL
838418	2014 GE_{101}	—	March 17, 2009	Kitt Peak	Spacewatch	·	1.4 km	MPC · JPL
838419	2014 HK	—	May 31, 2010	WISE	WISE	·	990 m	MPC · JPL
838420	2014 HV_{4}	—	July 13, 2001	Palomar	NEAT	·	570 m	MPC · JPL
838421	2014 HD_{7}	—	May 10, 2010	WISE	WISE	·	2.9 km	MPC · JPL
838422	2014 HN_{20}	—	April 21, 2014	Mount Lemmon	Mount Lemmon Survey	·	570 m	MPC · JPL
838423	2014 HR_{23}	—	June 1, 2010	WISE	WISE	·	1.2 km	MPC · JPL
838424	2014 HP_{35}	—	April 21, 2006	Kitt Peak	Spacewatch	·	950 m	MPC · JPL
838425	2014 HA_{37}	—	May 21, 2010	WISE	WISE	EOS	2.2 km	MPC · JPL
838426	2014 HY_{43}	—	February 2, 2009	Mount Lemmon	Mount Lemmon Survey	·	1.2 km	MPC · JPL
838427	2014 HH_{46}	—	April 14, 2010	WISE	WISE	·	770 m	MPC · JPL
838428	2014 HQ_{47}	—	September 30, 2010	Mount Lemmon	Mount Lemmon Survey	·	1.5 km	MPC · JPL
838429	2014 HN_{51}	—	March 25, 2014	Kitt Peak	Spacewatch	·	860 m	MPC · JPL
838430	2014 HX_{52}	—	April 4, 2014	Haleakala	Pan-STARRS 1	·	850 m	MPC · JPL
838431	2014 HX_{53}	—	April 23, 2014	Cerro Tololo-DECam	DECam	·	1.4 km	MPC · JPL
838432	2014 HE_{55}	—	March 19, 2010	WISE	WISE	·	500 m	MPC · JPL
838433	2014 HV_{56}	—	September 19, 2003	Kitt Peak	Spacewatch	MAR	720 m	MPC · JPL
838434	2014 HK_{57}	—	March 25, 2014	Kitt Peak	Spacewatch	·	1.4 km	MPC · JPL
838435	2014 HA_{62}	—	May 27, 2010	WISE	WISE	·	2.7 km	MPC · JPL
838436	2014 HL_{63}	—	April 23, 2014	Cerro Tololo-DECam	DECam	·	460 m	MPC · JPL
838437	2014 HJ_{65}	—	April 23, 2014	Cerro Tololo-DECam	DECam	·	910 m	MPC · JPL
838438	2014 HE_{72}	—	October 18, 2003	Sacramento Peak	SDSS	·	1.2 km	MPC · JPL
838439	2014 HN_{75}	—	August 19, 2006	Kitt Peak	Spacewatch	·	1.0 km	MPC · JPL
838440	2014 HS_{76}	—	September 30, 2011	Kitt Peak	Spacewatch	·	940 m	MPC · JPL
838441	2014 HH_{82}	—	April 20, 2014	Mount Lemmon	Mount Lemmon Survey	·	1.1 km	MPC · JPL
838442	2014 HH_{85}	—	August 29, 2016	Mount Lemmon	Mount Lemmon Survey	DOR	1.8 km	MPC · JPL
838443	2014 HV_{89}	—	March 25, 2014	Kitt Peak	Spacewatch	·	600 m	MPC · JPL
838444	2014 HP_{92}	—	August 14, 2015	Haleakala	Pan-STARRS 1	·	1.0 km	MPC · JPL
838445	2014 HU_{93}	—	July 19, 2015	Haleakala	Pan-STARRS 1	·	1.1 km	MPC · JPL
838446	2014 HU_{97}	—	April 22, 2007	Kitt Peak	Spacewatch	·	710 m	MPC · JPL
838447	2014 HK_{102}	—	April 8, 2010	Kitt Peak	Spacewatch	·	790 m	MPC · JPL
838448	2014 HT_{103}	—	October 27, 2003	Kitt Peak	Spacewatch	EUN	780 m	MPC · JPL
838449	2014 HK_{105}	—	April 23, 2014	Cerro Tololo-DECam	DECam	·	1.3 km	MPC · JPL
838450	2014 HC_{106}	—	November 4, 2016	Haleakala	Pan-STARRS 1	·	1.3 km	MPC · JPL
838451	2014 HN_{107}	—	July 24, 2015	Haleakala	Pan-STARRS 1	·	1.1 km	MPC · JPL
838452	2014 HE_{108}	—	April 23, 2014	Cerro Tololo-DECam	DECam	·	480 m	MPC · JPL
838453	2014 HN_{108}	—	April 24, 2014	Mount Lemmon	Mount Lemmon Survey	·	550 m	MPC · JPL
838454	2014 HC_{113}	—	September 4, 2015	Kitt Peak	Spacewatch	·	480 m	MPC · JPL
838455	2014 HV_{115}	—	April 24, 2014	Mount Lemmon	Mount Lemmon Survey	V	400 m	MPC · JPL
838456	2014 HU_{127}	—	April 3, 2010	Kitt Peak	Spacewatch	·	930 m	MPC · JPL
838457	2014 HJ_{131}	—	April 23, 2014	Mount Lemmon	Mount Lemmon Survey	PHO	790 m	MPC · JPL
838458	2014 HB_{132}	—	April 25, 2014	Mount Lemmon	Mount Lemmon Survey	·	740 m	MPC · JPL
838459	2014 HU_{133}	—	May 29, 2003	Kitt Peak	Spacewatch	·	3.7 km	MPC · JPL
838460	2014 HM_{134}	—	October 30, 2002	Sacramento Peak	SDSS	·	530 m	MPC · JPL
838461	2014 HO_{135}	—	April 5, 2014	Haleakala	Pan-STARRS 1	·	1.3 km	MPC · JPL
838462	2014 HR_{135}	—	July 13, 2010	WISE	WISE	EUP	2.6 km	MPC · JPL
838463	2014 HR_{136}	—	April 5, 2014	Haleakala	Pan-STARRS 1	3:2	3.6 km	MPC · JPL
838464	2014 HN_{141}	—	April 5, 2014	Haleakala	Pan-STARRS 1	·	1.3 km	MPC · JPL
838465	2014 HS_{142}	—	April 23, 2014	Cerro Tololo-DECam	DECam	HYG	1.8 km	MPC · JPL
838466	2014 HU_{144}	—	February 26, 2014	Haleakala	Pan-STARRS 1	NYS	680 m	MPC · JPL
838467	2014 HL_{150}	—	April 11, 2010	WISE	WISE	·	1.7 km	MPC · JPL
838468	2014 HN_{151}	—	March 24, 2014	Haleakala	Pan-STARRS 1	·	1.4 km	MPC · JPL
838469	2014 HG_{152}	—	October 25, 2005	Kitt Peak	Spacewatch	EUP	2.5 km	MPC · JPL
838470	2014 HN_{153}	—	April 1, 2014	Kitt Peak	Spacewatch	NYS	650 m	MPC · JPL
838471	2014 HS_{158}	—	April 24, 2014	Cerro Tololo-DECam	DECam	·	540 m	MPC · JPL
838472	2014 HY_{162}	—	March 21, 1999	Sacramento Peak	SDSS	·	1.9 km	MPC · JPL
838473	2014 HD_{164}	—	March 5, 2010	WISE	WISE	·	1.3 km	MPC · JPL
838474	2014 HE_{164}	—	November 20, 2006	Kitt Peak	Spacewatch	·	2.6 km	MPC · JPL
838475	2014 HH_{166}	—	March 24, 2014	Haleakala	Pan-STARRS 1	·	1.7 km	MPC · JPL
838476	2014 HV_{168}	—	April 28, 2014	Haleakala	Pan-STARRS 1	H	390 m	MPC · JPL
838477	2014 HJ_{177}	—	August 23, 2011	Haleakala	Pan-STARRS 1	·	770 m	MPC · JPL
838478	2014 HD_{180}	—	March 20, 1999	Sacramento Peak	SDSS	·	1.2 km	MPC · JPL
838479	2014 HS_{182}	—	February 13, 2001	Kitt Peak	Spacewatch	·	1.2 km	MPC · JPL
838480	2014 HF_{183}	—	January 13, 2002	Sacramento Peak	SDSS	BRA	1.6 km	MPC · JPL
838481	2014 HT_{183}	—	March 17, 1993	La Silla	UESAC	·	1.2 km	MPC · JPL
838482	2014 HC_{188}	—	April 5, 2014	Haleakala	Pan-STARRS 1	·	890 m	MPC · JPL
838483	2014 HE_{189}	—	April 30, 2014	Haleakala	Pan-STARRS 1	·	950 m	MPC · JPL
838484	2014 HT_{191}	—	April 30, 2014	Haleakala	Pan-STARRS 1	·	660 m	MPC · JPL
838485	2014 HA_{193}	—	September 23, 2000	Mauna Kea	B. J. Gladman, J. J. Kavelaars	·	1.8 km	MPC · JPL
838486	2014 HN_{193}	—	January 31, 2009	Kitt Peak	Spacewatch	·	1.0 km	MPC · JPL
838487	2014 HH_{195}	—	February 28, 2014	Haleakala	Pan-STARRS 1	·	1.5 km	MPC · JPL
838488	2014 HW_{201}	—	January 5, 2013	Cerro Tololo	D. E. Trilling, R. L. Allen	·	1.3 km	MPC · JPL
838489	2014 HT_{202}	—	February 1, 2006	Mount Lemmon	Mount Lemmon Survey	·	910 m	MPC · JPL
838490	2014 HX_{204}	—	April 24, 2014	Mount Lemmon	Mount Lemmon Survey	·	570 m	MPC · JPL
838491	2014 HU_{206}	—	April 30, 2014	Haleakala	Pan-STARRS 1	EOS	1.2 km	MPC · JPL
838492	2014 HL_{207}	—	April 30, 2014	Haleakala	Pan-STARRS 1	·	1.9 km	MPC · JPL
838493	2014 HP_{212}	—	April 21, 2014	Mount Lemmon	Mount Lemmon Survey	·	1.8 km	MPC · JPL
838494	2014 HU_{212}	—	April 22, 2014	Kitt Peak	Spacewatch	DOR	1.6 km	MPC · JPL
838495	2014 HG_{213}	—	April 20, 2014	Mount Lemmon	Mount Lemmon Survey	·	750 m	MPC · JPL
838496	2014 HK_{214}	—	July 8, 2010	WISE	WISE	(7605)	2.8 km	MPC · JPL
838497	2014 HU_{215}	—	June 15, 2010	WISE	WISE	PHO	680 m	MPC · JPL
838498	2014 HD_{216}	—	April 29, 2014	Mount Lemmon	Mount Lemmon Survey	H	470 m	MPC · JPL
838499	2014 HN_{216}	—	April 30, 2014	Haleakala	Pan-STARRS 1	·	770 m	MPC · JPL
838500	2014 HU_{218}	—	May 16, 2010	WISE	WISE	·	1.9 km	MPC · JPL

== 838501–838600 ==
back to top

Designation			Discovery			Properties		Ref
Permanent	Provisional	Named after	Date	Site	Discoverer(s)	Category	Diam.	Ref
838501	2014 HD_{219}	—	April 23, 2014	Mount Lemmon	Mount Lemmon Survey	·	1.4 km	MPC · JPL
838502	2014 HX_{219}	—	April 30, 2014	Haleakala	Pan-STARRS 1	NYS	520 m	MPC · JPL
838503	2014 HA_{224}	—	April 30, 2014	Haleakala	Pan-STARRS 1	·	1.2 km	MPC · JPL
838504	2014 HC_{224}	—	April 25, 2014	Mount Lemmon	Mount Lemmon Survey	·	1.4 km	MPC · JPL
838505	2014 HA_{229}	—	April 24, 2014	Mount Lemmon	Mount Lemmon Survey	·	870 m	MPC · JPL
838506	2014 HE_{229}	—	April 28, 2014	Kitt Peak	Spacewatch	3:2	4.7 km	MPC · JPL
838507	2014 HK_{229}	—	April 21, 2014	Kitt Peak	Spacewatch	·	520 m	MPC · JPL
838508	2014 HE_{230}	—	April 29, 2014	Haleakala	Pan-STARRS 1	·	1.1 km	MPC · JPL
838509	2014 HY_{238}	—	April 23, 2014	Cerro Tololo	DECam	KOR	850 m	MPC · JPL
838510	2014 HP_{239}	—	April 30, 2014	Haleakala	Pan-STARRS 1	·	2.4 km	MPC · JPL
838511	2014 HO_{240}	—	April 28, 2014	Cerro Tololo	DECam	·	950 m	MPC · JPL
838512	2014 HG_{241}	—	April 30, 2014	Haleakala	Pan-STARRS 1	·	780 m	MPC · JPL
838513	2014 HS_{243}	—	April 21, 2014	Mount Lemmon	Mount Lemmon Survey	·	1.3 km	MPC · JPL
838514	2014 HX_{258}	—	April 28, 2014	Cerro Tololo	DECam	·	750 m	MPC · JPL
838515	2014 HY_{262}	—	April 30, 2014	Haleakala	Pan-STARRS 1	·	830 m	MPC · JPL
838516	2014 HM_{265}	—	April 23, 2014	Cerro Tololo	DECam	KOR	880 m	MPC · JPL
838517	2014 HB_{283}	—	October 16, 2015	Kitt Peak	Spacewatch	MAS	610 m	MPC · JPL
838518	2014 HH_{297}	—	April 23, 2014	Cerro Tololo	DECam	·	2.7 km	MPC · JPL
838519	2014 HZ_{317}	—	April 29, 2014	Haleakala	Pan-STARRS 1	EOS	1.2 km	MPC · JPL
838520	2014 HR_{334}	—	April 24, 2014	Cerro Tololo	DECam	·	1.6 km	MPC · JPL
838521	2014 HQ_{350}	—	April 24, 2014	Mount Lemmon	Mount Lemmon Survey	EOS	1.3 km	MPC · JPL
838522	2014 HO_{465}	—	April 23, 2014	Mount Lemmon	Mount Lemmon Survey	·	1.6 km	MPC · JPL
838523	2014 HU_{531}	—	April 30, 2014	Haleakala	Pan-STARRS 1	·	1.4 km	MPC · JPL
838524	2014 JW_{6}	—	May 3, 2014	Mount Lemmon	Mount Lemmon Survey	·	1.3 km	MPC · JPL
838525	2014 JB_{9}	—	May 3, 2014	Mount Lemmon	Mount Lemmon Survey	AEO	820 m	MPC · JPL
838526	2014 JW_{12}	—	April 1, 2005	Kitt Peak	Spacewatch	MIS	2.2 km	MPC · JPL
838527	2014 JA_{17}	—	October 4, 2002	Sacramento Peak	SDSS	·	1.5 km	MPC · JPL
838528	2014 JG_{25}	—	May 6, 2014	WISE	WISE	T_{j} (2.9)	2.6 km	MPC · JPL
838529	2014 JE_{29}	—	May 11, 2010	WISE	WISE	·	1.8 km	MPC · JPL
838530	2014 JC_{30}	—	August 11, 2010	WISE	WISE	·	3.4 km	MPC · JPL
838531	2014 JO_{30}	—	April 10, 2014	Haleakala	Pan-STARRS 1	H	370 m	MPC · JPL
838532	2014 JP_{30}	—	March 30, 2011	Haleakala	Pan-STARRS 1	H	370 m	MPC · JPL
838533	2014 JT_{32}	—	March 20, 2010	Mount Lemmon	Mount Lemmon Survey	·	1.6 km	MPC · JPL
838534	2014 JX_{34}	—	March 13, 2010	Mount Lemmon	Mount Lemmon Survey	ERI	1.2 km	MPC · JPL
838535	2014 JB_{40}	—	April 5, 2014	Haleakala	Pan-STARRS 1	3:2	4.5 km	MPC · JPL
838536	2014 JC_{42}	—	April 25, 2014	Kitt Peak	Spacewatch	·	1.3 km	MPC · JPL
838537	2014 JO_{44}	—	April 15, 2010	Catalina	CSS	·	1.2 km	MPC · JPL
838538	2014 JL_{51}	—	May 8, 2014	Haleakala	Pan-STARRS 1	·	900 m	MPC · JPL
838539	2014 JA_{54}	—	May 8, 2014	Haleakala	Pan-STARRS 1	·	1.4 km	MPC · JPL
838540	2014 JS_{58}	—	April 8, 2014	Haleakala	Pan-STARRS 1	·	1.2 km	MPC · JPL
838541	2014 JR_{65}	—	May 3, 2014	Mount Lemmon	Mount Lemmon Survey	(2076)	510 m	MPC · JPL
838542	2014 JY_{65}	—	June 21, 2010	WISE	WISE	·	2.9 km	MPC · JPL
838543	2014 JL_{68}	—	May 6, 2010	WISE	WISE	PHO	1.8 km	MPC · JPL
838544	2014 JJ_{77}	—	April 5, 2014	Haleakala	Pan-STARRS 1	·	940 m	MPC · JPL
838545	2014 JH_{78}	—	May 9, 2014	Haleakala	Pan-STARRS 1	AMO	560 m	MPC · JPL
838546	2014 JV_{81}	—	May 7, 2014	Haleakala	Pan-STARRS 1	H	400 m	MPC · JPL
838547	2014 JM_{82}	—	April 11, 2008	Mount Lemmon	Mount Lemmon Survey	LUT	3.5 km	MPC · JPL
838548	2014 JR_{82}	—	May 4, 2014	Haleakala	Pan-STARRS 1	·	1.4 km	MPC · JPL
838549	2014 JG_{88}	—	May 4, 2014	Mount Lemmon	Mount Lemmon Survey	·	930 m	MPC · JPL
838550	2014 JO_{88}	—	May 4, 2014	Haleakala	Pan-STARRS 1	·	1.1 km	MPC · JPL
838551	2014 JZ_{89}	—	May 6, 2014	Haleakala	Pan-STARRS 1	·	770 m	MPC · JPL
838552	2014 JM_{91}	—	May 10, 2014	Haleakala	Pan-STARRS 1	·	1.1 km	MPC · JPL
838553	2014 JR_{91}	—	May 10, 2014	Haleakala	Pan-STARRS 1	·	1.2 km	MPC · JPL
838554	2014 JZ_{91}	—	May 10, 2014	Haleakala	Pan-STARRS 1	·	1.3 km	MPC · JPL
838555	2014 JY_{92}	—	May 7, 2014	Haleakala	Pan-STARRS 1	TIR	1.8 km	MPC · JPL
838556	2014 JZ_{92}	—	July 9, 2010	WISE	WISE	·	3.0 km	MPC · JPL
838557	2014 JB_{93}	—	May 7, 2014	Haleakala	Pan-STARRS 1	·	1.1 km	MPC · JPL
838558	2014 JR_{93}	—	March 5, 2008	Kitt Peak	Spacewatch	·	1.8 km	MPC · JPL
838559	2014 JF_{96}	—	December 23, 2006	Bergisch Gladbach	W. Bickel	(7605)	2.7 km	MPC · JPL
838560	2014 JJ_{96}	—	May 4, 2014	Haleakala	Pan-STARRS 1	·	1.6 km	MPC · JPL
838561	2014 JG_{97}	—	May 12, 2010	WISE	WISE	·	1.6 km	MPC · JPL
838562	2014 JY_{98}	—	May 7, 2014	Haleakala	Pan-STARRS 1	·	610 m	MPC · JPL
838563	2014 JE_{99}	—	May 7, 2014	Haleakala	Pan-STARRS 1	·	770 m	MPC · JPL
838564	2014 JM_{100}	—	May 6, 2014	Haleakala	Pan-STARRS 1	·	1.9 km	MPC · JPL
838565	2014 JZ_{100}	—	May 7, 2014	Haleakala	Pan-STARRS 1	·	2.3 km	MPC · JPL
838566	2014 JX_{101}	—	May 7, 2014	Haleakala	Pan-STARRS 1	·	790 m	MPC · JPL
838567	2014 JN_{103}	—	June 13, 2010	WISE	WISE	·	2.2 km	MPC · JPL
838568	2014 JW_{103}	—	May 6, 2014	Haleakala	Pan-STARRS 1	·	1.5 km	MPC · JPL
838569	2014 JL_{108}	—	May 7, 2014	Haleakala	Pan-STARRS 1	·	1.2 km	MPC · JPL
838570	2014 JW_{108}	—	May 8, 2014	Haleakala	Pan-STARRS 1	·	1.9 km	MPC · JPL
838571	2014 JW_{109}	—	May 7, 2014	Haleakala	Pan-STARRS 1	·	1.3 km	MPC · JPL
838572	2014 JE_{110}	—	May 7, 2014	Haleakala	Pan-STARRS 1	·	1.5 km	MPC · JPL
838573	2014 JT_{110}	—	May 9, 2014	Haleakala	Pan-STARRS 1	·	1.2 km	MPC · JPL
838574	2014 JL_{111}	—	May 4, 2014	Haleakala	Pan-STARRS 1	·	520 m	MPC · JPL
838575	2014 JN_{111}	—	May 5, 2014	Haleakala	Pan-STARRS 1	·	1.3 km	MPC · JPL
838576	2014 JD_{112}	—	May 7, 2014	Haleakala	Pan-STARRS 1	·	1.3 km	MPC · JPL
838577	2014 JR_{112}	—	May 7, 2014	Haleakala	Pan-STARRS 1	·	1.3 km	MPC · JPL
838578	2014 JG_{113}	—	May 4, 2014	Haleakala	Pan-STARRS 1	·	2.4 km	MPC · JPL
838579	2014 JR_{113}	—	May 2, 2014	Mount Lemmon	Mount Lemmon Survey	·	1.5 km	MPC · JPL
838580	2014 JW_{114}	—	May 6, 2014	Haleakala	Pan-STARRS 1	·	1.4 km	MPC · JPL
838581	2014 JX_{118}	—	May 7, 2014	Haleakala	Pan-STARRS 1	·	890 m	MPC · JPL
838582	2014 JG_{119}	—	May 8, 2014	Haleakala	Pan-STARRS 1	·	820 m	MPC · JPL
838583	2014 JR_{123}	—	May 7, 2014	Haleakala	Pan-STARRS 1	·	1.2 km	MPC · JPL
838584	2014 JV_{126}	—	May 7, 2014	Haleakala	Pan-STARRS 1	EOS	1.3 km	MPC · JPL
838585	2014 JM_{128}	—	May 3, 2014	Haleakala	Pan-STARRS 1	·	1.7 km	MPC · JPL
838586	2014 JO_{130}	—	May 2, 2014	Mount Lemmon	Mount Lemmon Survey	·	930 m	MPC · JPL
838587	2014 JG_{131}	—	May 2, 2014	Mount Lemmon	Mount Lemmon Survey	·	1.1 km	MPC · JPL
838588	2014 JF_{140}	—	May 5, 2014	Cerro Tololo-DECam	DECam	·	1.8 km	MPC · JPL
838589	2014 JU_{140}	—	May 9, 2014	Haleakala	Pan-STARRS 1	URS	2.2 km	MPC · JPL
838590	2014 JA_{144}	—	May 7, 2014	Haleakala	Pan-STARRS 1	·	1.1 km	MPC · JPL
838591	2014 KP_{1}	—	September 30, 2006	Mount Lemmon	Mount Lemmon Survey	·	1.6 km	MPC · JPL
838592	2014 KK_{5}	—	August 29, 2006	Kitt Peak	Spacewatch	·	1.1 km	MPC · JPL
838593	2014 KA_{14}	—	May 10, 2014	Haleakala	Pan-STARRS 1	·	580 m	MPC · JPL
838594	2014 KS_{14}	—	March 31, 2003	Sacramento Peak	SDSS	·	2.1 km	MPC · JPL
838595	2014 KU_{15}	—	April 24, 2014	Kitt Peak	Spacewatch	·	540 m	MPC · JPL
838596	2014 KW_{18}	—	October 3, 2011	Mount Lemmon	Mount Lemmon Survey	·	930 m	MPC · JPL
838597	2014 KB_{19}	—	May 4, 2014	Haleakala	Pan-STARRS 1	·	1.3 km	MPC · JPL
838598	2014 KH_{21}	—	April 30, 2014	Haleakala	Pan-STARRS 1	H	290 m	MPC · JPL
838599	2014 KQ_{24}	—	March 9, 2010	WISE	WISE	·	1.1 km	MPC · JPL
838600	2014 KP_{27}	—	February 23, 2006	Anderson Mesa	LONEOS	·	1.0 km	MPC · JPL

== 838601–838700 ==
back to top

Designation			Discovery			Properties		Ref
Permanent	Provisional	Named after	Date	Site	Discoverer(s)	Category	Diam.	Ref
838601	2014 KD_{28}	—	April 13, 2010	WISE	WISE	·	2.2 km	MPC · JPL
838602	2014 KS_{33}	—	June 29, 2010	WISE	WISE	PHO	770 m	MPC · JPL
838603	2014 KB_{34}	—	May 4, 2014	Haleakala	Pan-STARRS 1	·	2.1 km	MPC · JPL
838604	2014 KV_{40}	—	May 31, 2006	Mount Lemmon	Mount Lemmon Survey	3:2	3.7 km	MPC · JPL
838605	2014 KA_{41}	—	March 20, 1999	Sacramento Peak	SDSS	NYS	950 m	MPC · JPL
838606	2014 KJ_{44}	—	July 11, 2010	WISE	WISE	·	1.8 km	MPC · JPL
838607	2014 KY_{44}	—	May 8, 2014	Haleakala	Pan-STARRS 1	H	320 m	MPC · JPL
838608	2014 KT_{45}	—	October 4, 2012	Haleakala	Pan-STARRS 1	H	310 m	MPC · JPL
838609	2014 KY_{46}	—	April 5, 2014	Haleakala	Pan-STARRS 1	NYS	660 m	MPC · JPL
838610	2014 KS_{51}	—	April 29, 2010	WISE	WISE	EUN	840 m	MPC · JPL
838611	2014 KJ_{54}	—	May 7, 2014	Haleakala	Pan-STARRS 1	·	1.2 km	MPC · JPL
838612	2014 KB_{57}	—	May 27, 2010	WISE	WISE	·	2.8 km	MPC · JPL
838613	2014 KH_{58}	—	June 2, 2010	WISE	WISE	·	830 m	MPC · JPL
838614	2014 KK_{59}	—	April 8, 2010	Kitt Peak	Spacewatch	·	1.1 km	MPC · JPL
838615	2014 KQ_{60}	—	May 24, 2014	Haleakala	Pan-STARRS 1	·	840 m	MPC · JPL
838616	2014 KK_{64}	—	May 21, 2014	Haleakala	Pan-STARRS 1	·	1.1 km	MPC · JPL
838617	2014 KG_{67}	—	October 25, 2001	Sacramento Peak	SDSS	·	1.7 km	MPC · JPL
838618	2014 KV_{75}	—	September 26, 2003	Palomar	NEAT	·	750 m	MPC · JPL
838619	2014 KM_{77}	—	July 5, 2010	WISE	WISE	·	2.6 km	MPC · JPL
838620	2014 KL_{79}	—	March 21, 1999	Sacramento Peak	SDSS	·	1.0 km	MPC · JPL
838621	2014 KS_{92}	—	May 28, 2014	Mount Lemmon	Mount Lemmon Survey	·	1.0 km	MPC · JPL
838622	2014 KX_{95}	—	May 28, 2014	Mount Lemmon	Mount Lemmon Survey	·	2.0 km	MPC · JPL
838623	2014 KL_{103}	—	May 23, 2014	Haleakala	Pan-STARRS 1	·	1.2 km	MPC · JPL
838624	2014 KY_{103}	—	May 7, 2014	Haleakala	Pan-STARRS 1	KON	1.5 km	MPC · JPL
838625	2014 KT_{106}	—	May 21, 2014	Kitt Peak	Spacewatch	·	1.2 km	MPC · JPL
838626	2014 KF_{112}	—	January 1, 2009	Kitt Peak	Spacewatch	·	1.2 km	MPC · JPL
838627	2014 KR_{113}	—	July 16, 2010	WISE	WISE	T_{j} (2.97) · EUP	3.1 km	MPC · JPL
838628	2014 KX_{115}	—	May 28, 2014	Haleakala	Pan-STARRS 1	·	610 m	MPC · JPL
838629	2014 KQ_{117}	—	May 21, 2014	Haleakala	Pan-STARRS 1	·	900 m	MPC · JPL
838630	2014 KC_{120}	—	March 27, 2017	Mount Lemmon	Mount Lemmon Survey	·	570 m	MPC · JPL
838631	2014 KH_{122}	—	May 23, 2014	Haleakala	Pan-STARRS 1	·	1.5 km	MPC · JPL
838632	2014 KA_{123}	—	May 26, 2014	Haleakala	Pan-STARRS 1	·	770 m	MPC · JPL
838633	2014 KE_{123}	—	May 28, 2014	Haleakala	Pan-STARRS 1	·	490 m	MPC · JPL
838634	2014 KW_{123}	—	May 21, 2014	Haleakala	Pan-STARRS 1	·	1.8 km	MPC · JPL
838635	2014 KP_{125}	—	May 28, 2014	Haleakala	Pan-STARRS 1	·	740 m	MPC · JPL
838636	2014 KR_{126}	—	May 23, 2014	Haleakala	Pan-STARRS 1	·	1.7 km	MPC · JPL
838637	2014 KZ_{127}	—	May 23, 2014	Haleakala	Pan-STARRS 1	·	1.3 km	MPC · JPL
838638	2014 KV_{128}	—	May 21, 2014	Haleakala	Pan-STARRS 1	EUN	880 m	MPC · JPL
838639	2014 KD_{129}	—	August 24, 2008	Kitt Peak	Spacewatch	·	490 m	MPC · JPL
838640	2014 KG_{130}	—	May 21, 2014	Haleakala	Pan-STARRS 1	·	1.3 km	MPC · JPL
838641	2014 KA_{131}	—	May 25, 2014	Haleakala	Pan-STARRS 1	·	2.1 km	MPC · JPL
838642	2014 KF_{131}	—	May 28, 2014	Mount Lemmon	Mount Lemmon Survey	·	1.2 km	MPC · JPL
838643	2014 KQ_{131}	—	May 31, 2014	Haleakala	Pan-STARRS 1	·	1.8 km	MPC · JPL
838644	2014 KS_{131}	—	May 24, 2014	Haleakala	Pan-STARRS 1	·	1.1 km	MPC · JPL
838645	2014 KN_{133}	—	May 26, 2014	Haleakala	Pan-STARRS 1	·	1.4 km	MPC · JPL
838646	2014 KW_{133}	—	May 23, 2014	Haleakala	Pan-STARRS 1	·	960 m	MPC · JPL
838647	2014 KY_{136}	—	May 21, 2014	Haleakala	Pan-STARRS 1	·	600 m	MPC · JPL
838648	2014 KS_{138}	—	May 27, 2014	Haleakala	Pan-STARRS 1	·	1.6 km	MPC · JPL
838649	2014 KM_{139}	—	May 23, 2014	Haleakala	Pan-STARRS 1	·	2.3 km	MPC · JPL
838650	2014 KU_{140}	—	May 24, 2014	Haleakala	Pan-STARRS 1	·	2.1 km	MPC · JPL
838651	2014 KY_{144}	—	January 8, 2006	Mount Lemmon	Mount Lemmon Survey	·	830 m	MPC · JPL
838652	2014 KF_{146}	—	May 7, 2014	Haleakala	Pan-STARRS 1	·	1.8 km	MPC · JPL
838653	2014 KW_{147}	—	May 23, 2014	Haleakala	Pan-STARRS 1	·	1.3 km	MPC · JPL
838654	2014 KH_{150}	—	October 30, 2011	Mount Lemmon	Mount Lemmon Survey	·	1.3 km	MPC · JPL
838655	2014 KZ_{156}	—	May 21, 2014	Haleakala	Pan-STARRS 1	NYS	970 m	MPC · JPL
838656	2014 LT	—	October 11, 2010	Mount Lemmon	Mount Lemmon Survey	·	1.6 km	MPC · JPL
838657	2014 LM_{1}	—	May 4, 2014	Haleakala	Pan-STARRS 1	V	410 m	MPC · JPL
838658	2014 LW_{2}	—	May 21, 2014	Mount Lemmon	Mount Lemmon Survey	·	930 m	MPC · JPL
838659	2014 LL_{3}	—	May 14, 2010	WISE	WISE	·	1.1 km	MPC · JPL
838660	2014 LP_{7}	—	May 24, 2014	Haleakala	Pan-STARRS 1	·	1.4 km	MPC · JPL
838661	2014 LA_{12}	—	June 10, 2010	WISE	WISE	·	1.4 km	MPC · JPL
838662	2014 LK_{15}	—	May 9, 2010	WISE	WISE	·	970 m	MPC · JPL
838663	2014 LS_{15}	—	June 2, 2014	Mount Lemmon	Mount Lemmon Survey	·	1.9 km	MPC · JPL
838664	2014 LD_{16}	—	June 17, 2009	Kitt Peak	Spacewatch	·	1.4 km	MPC · JPL
838665	2014 LZ_{17}	—	May 23, 2014	Haleakala	Pan-STARRS 1	EOS	1.4 km	MPC · JPL
838666	2014 LK_{20}	—	April 20, 2010	WISE	WISE	·	710 m	MPC · JPL
838667	2014 LD_{21}	—	April 10, 2014	Haleakala	Pan-STARRS 1	H	370 m	MPC · JPL
838668	2014 LP_{21}	—	April 26, 2010	WISE	WISE	·	1.5 km	MPC · JPL
838669	2014 LZ_{22}	—	May 28, 2014	Haleakala	Pan-STARRS 1	·	530 m	MPC · JPL
838670	2014 LF_{24}	—	April 10, 2010	WISE	WISE	·	1.1 km	MPC · JPL
838671	2014 LL_{25}	—	August 28, 2020	Mount Lemmon	Mount Lemmon Survey	·	2.0 km	MPC · JPL
838672	2014 LR_{25}	—	March 14, 2010	WISE	WISE	·	1.7 km	MPC · JPL
838673	2014 LC_{26}	—	June 9, 2014	Mount Lemmon	Mount Lemmon Survey	H	370 m	MPC · JPL
838674	2014 LD_{29}	—	May 7, 2014	Haleakala	Pan-STARRS 1	·	2.2 km	MPC · JPL
838675	2014 LV_{30}	—	February 14, 2013	Haleakala	Pan-STARRS 1	·	1.7 km	MPC · JPL
838676	2014 LG_{31}	—	June 3, 2014	Haleakala	Pan-STARRS 1	·	2.1 km	MPC · JPL
838677	2014 LW_{32}	—	July 15, 2010	WISE	WISE	·	3.5 km	MPC · JPL
838678	2014 LF_{33}	—	June 6, 2014	Haleakala	Pan-STARRS 1	·	1.6 km	MPC · JPL
838679	2014 LL_{33}	—	June 4, 2014	Haleakala	Pan-STARRS 1	·	930 m	MPC · JPL
838680	2014 LX_{33}	—	June 5, 2014	Haleakala	Pan-STARRS 1	EOS	1.5 km	MPC · JPL
838681	2014 LF_{35}	—	June 4, 2014	Haleakala	Pan-STARRS 1	·	1.1 km	MPC · JPL
838682	2014 LQ_{35}	—	November 21, 2015	Mount Lemmon	Mount Lemmon Survey	(5)	910 m	MPC · JPL
838683	2014 LM_{36}	—	May 22, 2010	WISE	WISE	·	1.3 km	MPC · JPL
838684	2014 LP_{36}	—	June 3, 2014	Haleakala	Pan-STARRS 1	·	2.3 km	MPC · JPL
838685	2014 LS_{37}	—	June 2, 2014	Haleakala	Pan-STARRS 1	·	1.8 km	MPC · JPL
838686	2014 LV_{37}	—	May 7, 2014	Haleakala	Pan-STARRS 1	·	1.4 km	MPC · JPL
838687	2014 LH_{39}	—	June 5, 2014	Haleakala	Pan-STARRS 1	·	720 m	MPC · JPL
838688	2014 LA_{40}	—	June 4, 2014	Haleakala	Pan-STARRS 1	·	410 m	MPC · JPL
838689	2014 LX_{42}	—	June 4, 2014	Haleakala	Pan-STARRS 1	·	1.9 km	MPC · JPL
838690	2014 MO	—	January 13, 2002	Sacramento Peak	SDSS	H	640 m	MPC · JPL
838691	2014 MA_{2}	—	June 18, 2014	Mount Lemmon	Mount Lemmon Survey	·	1.2 km	MPC · JPL
838692	2014 MJ_{5}	—	October 25, 2011	Haleakala	Pan-STARRS 1	·	1.1 km	MPC · JPL
838693	2014 MX_{10}	—	June 21, 2014	Mount Lemmon	Mount Lemmon Survey	·	750 m	MPC · JPL
838694	2014 MX_{12}	—	June 21, 2014	Mount Lemmon	Mount Lemmon Survey	·	2.1 km	MPC · JPL
838695	2014 MN_{13}	—	May 30, 2014	Haleakala	Pan-STARRS 1	PHO	720 m	MPC · JPL
838696	2014 MU_{13}	—	June 2, 2014	Haleakala	Pan-STARRS 1	·	1.6 km	MPC · JPL
838697	2014 MW_{22}	—	June 23, 2014	Mount Lemmon	Mount Lemmon Survey	·	1.3 km	MPC · JPL
838698	2014 MS_{23}	—	December 11, 2004	Mauna Kea	P. A. Wiegert, D. D. Balam	NYS	1.1 km	MPC · JPL
838699	2014 MV_{23}	—	June 25, 2014	Mount Lemmon	Mount Lemmon Survey	·	2.0 km	MPC · JPL
838700	2014 MO_{28}	—	July 6, 2010	WISE	WISE	·	2.1 km	MPC · JPL

== 838701–838800 ==
back to top

Designation			Discovery			Properties		Ref
Permanent	Provisional	Named after	Date	Site	Discoverer(s)	Category	Diam.	Ref
838701	2014 MZ_{28}	—	May 28, 2014	Haleakala	Pan-STARRS 1	·	780 m	MPC · JPL
838702	2014 MB_{39}	—	May 10, 2014	Haleakala	Pan-STARRS 1	PHO	680 m	MPC · JPL
838703	2014 MJ_{39}	—	September 10, 2007	Kitt Peak	Spacewatch	·	630 m	MPC · JPL
838704	2014 MO_{40}	—	May 31, 2014	Haleakala	Pan-STARRS 1	HNS	880 m	MPC · JPL
838705	2014 MV_{40}	—	April 23, 2010	WISE	WISE	·	1.5 km	MPC · JPL
838706	2014 ML_{48}	—	May 17, 2010	WISE	WISE	·	1.9 km	MPC · JPL
838707	2014 MP_{51}	—	June 3, 2014	Haleakala	Pan-STARRS 1	·	2.4 km	MPC · JPL
838708	2014 MS_{51}	—	June 3, 2014	Haleakala	Pan-STARRS 1	·	2.7 km	MPC · JPL
838709	2014 MM_{52}	—	June 7, 2010	WISE	WISE	·	1.5 km	MPC · JPL
838710	2014 MV_{53}	—	June 23, 2010	WISE	WISE	·	2.2 km	MPC · JPL
838711	2014 ME_{57}	—	July 18, 2001	Palomar	NEAT	·	1.4 km	MPC · JPL
838712	2014 MJ_{57}	—	May 22, 2010	Kitt Peak	Spacewatch	ERI	1.1 km	MPC · JPL
838713	2014 MO_{57}	—	January 15, 2010	WISE	WISE	·	2.2 km	MPC · JPL
838714	2014 MQ_{57}	—	June 4, 2014	Mount Lemmon	Mount Lemmon Survey	·	2.3 km	MPC · JPL
838715	2014 MY_{57}	—	April 29, 2008	Kitt Peak	Spacewatch	·	1.6 km	MPC · JPL
838716	2014 MG_{59}	—	June 30, 2014	Mount Lemmon	Mount Lemmon Survey	·	2.3 km	MPC · JPL
838717	2014 MA_{60}	—	May 31, 2014	Haleakala	Pan-STARRS 1	T_{j} (2.9)	1.7 km	MPC · JPL
838718	2014 MV_{61}	—	June 27, 2014	Haleakala	Pan-STARRS 1	TIR	1.8 km	MPC · JPL
838719	2014 MB_{63}	—	June 28, 2014	Kitt Peak	Spacewatch	·	1.7 km	MPC · JPL
838720	2014 MY_{65}	—	May 5, 2008	Kitt Peak	Spacewatch	·	1.6 km	MPC · JPL
838721	2014 MC_{71}	—	June 27, 2014	Haleakala	Pan-STARRS 1	·	1.7 km	MPC · JPL
838722	2014 MF_{71}	—	June 28, 2014	Haleakala	Pan-STARRS 1	·	1.4 km	MPC · JPL
838723	2014 MX_{71}	—	March 10, 2007	Mount Lemmon	Mount Lemmon Survey	THM	1.7 km	MPC · JPL
838724	2014 MN_{73}	—	July 30, 2010	WISE	WISE	MIS	1.8 km	MPC · JPL
838725	2014 MV_{75}	—	October 3, 2010	Kitt Peak	Spacewatch	MRX	820 m	MPC · JPL
838726	2014 MA_{77}	—	June 28, 2014	Haleakala	Pan-STARRS 1	·	1.1 km	MPC · JPL
838727	2014 MU_{77}	—	January 19, 2012	Haleakala	Pan-STARRS 1	·	2.1 km	MPC · JPL
838728	2014 ME_{80}	—	June 28, 2014	Haleakala	Pan-STARRS 1	·	2.5 km	MPC · JPL
838729	2014 MG_{80}	—	June 26, 2014	Haleakala	Pan-STARRS 1	·	650 m	MPC · JPL
838730	2014 MU_{82}	—	July 15, 2010	WISE	WISE	·	1.6 km	MPC · JPL
838731	2014 MB_{83}	—	June 24, 2014	Haleakala	Pan-STARRS 1	·	2.2 km	MPC · JPL
838732	2014 MT_{83}	—	June 27, 2014	Haleakala	Pan-STARRS 1	·	2.1 km	MPC · JPL
838733	2014 MC_{84}	—	June 24, 2014	Haleakala	Pan-STARRS 1	·	2.2 km	MPC · JPL
838734	2014 MP_{84}	—	May 19, 2010	WISE	WISE	·	1.4 km	MPC · JPL
838735	2014 MF_{85}	—	June 18, 2014	Haleakala	Pan-STARRS 1	·	1.7 km	MPC · JPL
838736	2014 MP_{86}	—	June 26, 2014	Haleakala	Pan-STARRS 1	·	1.7 km	MPC · JPL
838737	2014 MM_{89}	—	June 24, 2014	Haleakala	Pan-STARRS 1	·	2.2 km	MPC · JPL
838738	2014 MA_{91}	—	June 20, 2014	Haleakala	Pan-STARRS 1	·	1.7 km	MPC · JPL
838739	2014 MJ_{91}	—	June 24, 2014	Haleakala	Pan-STARRS 1	·	1.9 km	MPC · JPL
838740	2014 MN_{91}	—	June 27, 2014	Haleakala	Pan-STARRS 1	·	1.9 km	MPC · JPL
838741	2014 MO_{91}	—	June 24, 2014	Haleakala	Pan-STARRS 1	·	1.7 km	MPC · JPL
838742	2014 MU_{91}	—	June 21, 2014	Mount Lemmon	Mount Lemmon Survey	H	340 m	MPC · JPL
838743	2014 MX_{91}	—	June 24, 2014	Haleakala	Pan-STARRS 1	·	1.9 km	MPC · JPL
838744	2014 MZ_{91}	—	June 24, 2014	Haleakala	Pan-STARRS 1	·	1.6 km	MPC · JPL
838745	2014 ME_{92}	—	June 26, 2014	Kitt Peak	Spacewatch	EOS	1.5 km	MPC · JPL
838746	2014 MF_{92}	—	June 24, 2014	Haleakala	Pan-STARRS 1	TIR	2.3 km	MPC · JPL
838747	2014 MK_{92}	—	June 30, 2014	Haleakala	Pan-STARRS 1	EOS	1.4 km	MPC · JPL
838748	2014 MO_{92}	—	June 28, 2014	Haleakala	Pan-STARRS 1	·	2.0 km	MPC · JPL
838749	2014 MU_{92}	—	June 24, 2014	Haleakala	Pan-STARRS 1	·	1.9 km	MPC · JPL
838750	2014 MH_{93}	—	June 29, 2014	Haleakala	Pan-STARRS 1	TIR	1.9 km	MPC · JPL
838751	2014 MJ_{93}	—	June 30, 2014	Haleakala	Pan-STARRS 1	·	1.6 km	MPC · JPL
838752	2014 ML_{93}	—	June 28, 2014	Haleakala	Pan-STARRS 1	LIX	2.2 km	MPC · JPL
838753	2014 MT_{93}	—	June 29, 2014	Haleakala	Pan-STARRS 1	·	1.9 km	MPC · JPL
838754	2014 MB_{94}	—	June 24, 2014	Haleakala	Pan-STARRS 1	H	410 m	MPC · JPL
838755	2014 MF_{100}	—	June 30, 2014	Haleakala	Pan-STARRS 1	·	1.9 km	MPC · JPL
838756	2014 ME_{106}	—	June 27, 2014	Haleakala	Pan-STARRS 1	·	2.1 km	MPC · JPL
838757	2014 MQ_{106}	—	June 28, 2014	Haleakala	Pan-STARRS 1	·	1.9 km	MPC · JPL
838758	2014 NK_{7}	—	June 26, 2014	Haleakala	Pan-STARRS 1	·	2.0 km	MPC · JPL
838759	2014 NF_{10}	—	July 1, 2014	Haleakala	Pan-STARRS 1	·	1.5 km	MPC · JPL
838760	2014 NJ_{12}	—	December 2, 2010	Kitt Peak	Spacewatch	·	1.5 km	MPC · JPL
838761	2014 NB_{15}	—	September 26, 2009	Catalina	CSS	·	2.8 km	MPC · JPL
838762	2014 NZ_{17}	—	July 1, 2014	Mount Lemmon	Mount Lemmon Survey	·	1.6 km	MPC · JPL
838763	2014 NH_{18}	—	July 20, 1993	La Silla	E. W. Elst	·	2.7 km	MPC · JPL
838764	2014 NN_{19}	—	July 2, 2014	Mount Lemmon	Mount Lemmon Survey	·	2.1 km	MPC · JPL
838765	2014 NG_{20}	—	April 12, 2013	Haleakala	Pan-STARRS 1	·	2.1 km	MPC · JPL
838766	2014 NM_{21}	—	June 3, 2014	Haleakala	Pan-STARRS 1	·	2.2 km	MPC · JPL
838767	2014 ND_{22}	—	May 1, 2010	WISE	WISE	·	1.5 km	MPC · JPL
838768	2014 NC_{23}	—	September 15, 2003	Palomar	NEAT	·	930 m	MPC · JPL
838769	2014 NU_{28}	—	July 2, 2014	Haleakala	Pan-STARRS 1	EOS	1.3 km	MPC · JPL
838770	2014 NX_{28}	—	July 2, 2014	Haleakala	Pan-STARRS 1	URS	2.0 km	MPC · JPL
838771	2014 NO_{31}	—	July 2, 2014	Haleakala	Pan-STARRS 1	·	710 m	MPC · JPL
838772	2014 NR_{31}	—	January 12, 2010	WISE	WISE	·	3.0 km	MPC · JPL
838773	2014 NP_{37}	—	June 24, 2014	Haleakala	Pan-STARRS 1	·	540 m	MPC · JPL
838774	2014 NY_{37}	—	September 2, 2010	Mount Lemmon	Mount Lemmon Survey	·	940 m	MPC · JPL
838775	2014 NN_{39}	—	July 26, 2010	WISE	WISE	·	1.7 km	MPC · JPL
838776	2014 NY_{40}	—	September 18, 2009	Kitt Peak	Spacewatch	·	2.2 km	MPC · JPL
838777	2014 NW_{41}	—	July 3, 2014	Haleakala	Pan-STARRS 1	·	2.7 km	MPC · JPL
838778	2014 NK_{44}	—	June 2, 2010	WISE	WISE	·	1.8 km	MPC · JPL
838779	2014 NW_{46}	—	July 2, 2014	Haleakala	Pan-STARRS 1	H	390 m	MPC · JPL
838780	2014 NJ_{47}	—	June 24, 2014	Haleakala	Pan-STARRS 1	·	1.9 km	MPC · JPL
838781	2014 NV_{47}	—	May 25, 2014	Haleakala	Pan-STARRS 1	V	550 m	MPC · JPL
838782	2014 NV_{48}	—	September 17, 2009	Kitt Peak	Spacewatch	TIR	1.9 km	MPC · JPL
838783	2014 NF_{50}	—	July 3, 2014	Haleakala	Pan-STARRS 1	BRA	1.3 km	MPC · JPL
838784	2014 NA_{54}	—	July 29, 2005	Palomar	NEAT	·	2.7 km	MPC · JPL
838785	2014 NF_{54}	—	July 6, 2014	Haleakala	Pan-STARRS 1	·	450 m	MPC · JPL
838786	2014 NY_{55}	—	July 6, 2014	Haleakala	Pan-STARRS 1	·	2.2 km	MPC · JPL
838787	2014 NA_{59}	—	June 21, 2010	WISE	WISE	·	2.6 km	MPC · JPL
838788	2014 NZ_{60}	—	June 1, 2010	WISE	WISE	·	640 m	MPC · JPL
838789	2014 NT_{63}	—	July 3, 2014	Haleakala	Pan-STARRS 1	T_{j} (2.93)	2.2 km	MPC · JPL
838790	2014 NP_{66}	—	July 7, 2014	Haleakala	Pan-STARRS 1	LIX · critical	2.0 km	MPC · JPL
838791	2014 NX_{66}	—	July 7, 2014	Haleakala	Pan-STARRS 1	·	1.4 km	MPC · JPL
838792	2014 NY_{66}	—	July 7, 2014	Haleakala	Pan-STARRS 1	·	1.4 km	MPC · JPL
838793	2014 NR_{67}	—	November 13, 2010	Kitt Peak	Spacewatch	·	1.6 km	MPC · JPL
838794	2014 NB_{68}	—	July 8, 2014	Haleakala	Pan-STARRS 1	·	960 m	MPC · JPL
838795	2014 NR_{68}	—	July 7, 2014	Haleakala	Pan-STARRS 1	·	1.4 km	MPC · JPL
838796	2014 NW_{69}	—	July 1, 2014	Haleakala	Pan-STARRS 1	·	1.1 km	MPC · JPL
838797	2014 NO_{71}	—	July 7, 2014	Haleakala	Pan-STARRS 1	·	1.4 km	MPC · JPL
838798	2014 NV_{73}	—	July 1, 2014	Haleakala	Pan-STARRS 1	·	2.1 km	MPC · JPL
838799	2014 NS_{74}	—	July 8, 2014	Haleakala	Pan-STARRS 1	EUP	2.2 km	MPC · JPL
838800	2014 NU_{74}	—	June 26, 2014	Kitt Peak	Spacewatch	·	2.3 km	MPC · JPL

== 838801–838900 ==
back to top

Designation			Discovery			Properties		Ref
Permanent	Provisional	Named after	Date	Site	Discoverer(s)	Category	Diam.	Ref
838801	2014 NX_{75}	—	July 4, 2014	Haleakala	Pan-STARRS 1	·	1.7 km	MPC · JPL
838802	2014 NV_{78}	—	July 2, 2014	Kitt Peak	Spacewatch	·	1.6 km	MPC · JPL
838803	2014 NY_{78}	—	July 9, 2014	Haleakala	Pan-STARRS 1	DOR	1.6 km	MPC · JPL
838804	2014 NM_{80}	—	July 8, 2014	Haleakala	Pan-STARRS 1	VER	1.8 km	MPC · JPL
838805	2014 NY_{82}	—	July 4, 2014	Haleakala	Pan-STARRS 1	·	2.2 km	MPC · JPL
838806	2014 ND_{83}	—	July 10, 2014	Roque de los Muchachos	EURONEAR	·	2.1 km	MPC · JPL
838807	2014 NL_{83}	—	July 8, 2014	Haleakala	Pan-STARRS 1	TIR	1.8 km	MPC · JPL
838808	2014 NR_{83}	—	July 4, 2014	Haleakala	Pan-STARRS 1	·	1.7 km	MPC · JPL
838809	2014 NC_{84}	—	July 1, 2014	Haleakala	Pan-STARRS 1	·	2.3 km	MPC · JPL
838810	2014 NF_{84}	—	July 4, 2014	Haleakala	Pan-STARRS 1	·	1.7 km	MPC · JPL
838811	2014 ND_{85}	—	July 7, 2014	Haleakala	Pan-STARRS 1	T_{j} (2.97)	2.4 km	MPC · JPL
838812	2014 NZ_{85}	—	March 14, 2013	Kitt Peak	Spacewatch	EOS	1.5 km	MPC · JPL
838813	2014 NN_{87}	—	July 8, 2014	Haleakala	Pan-STARRS 1	EOS	1.4 km	MPC · JPL
838814	2014 NS_{87}	—	July 1, 2014	Haleakala	Pan-STARRS 1	ADE	1.5 km	MPC · JPL
838815	2014 NT_{87}	—	July 8, 2014	Haleakala	Pan-STARRS 1	·	1.1 km	MPC · JPL
838816	2014 NT_{91}	—	July 6, 2014	Haleakala	Pan-STARRS 1	·	910 m	MPC · JPL
838817	2014 NK_{92}	—	July 1, 2014	Haleakala	Pan-STARRS 1	·	2.0 km	MPC · JPL
838818	2014 NH_{95}	—	July 8, 2014	Haleakala	Pan-STARRS 1	HYG	2.0 km	MPC · JPL
838819	2014 OV_{2}	—	June 25, 2014	Mount Lemmon	Mount Lemmon Survey	·	2.1 km	MPC · JPL
838820	2014 OT_{3}	—	April 5, 2008	Mount Lemmon	Mount Lemmon Survey	·	1.6 km	MPC · JPL
838821	2014 OL_{5}	—	June 5, 2014	Haleakala	Pan-STARRS 1	(1547)	1.3 km	MPC · JPL
838822	2014 OQ_{5}	—	July 6, 2014	Haleakala	Pan-STARRS 1	·	640 m	MPC · JPL
838823	2014 OF_{6}	—	December 22, 2004	Catalina	CSS	PHO	940 m	MPC · JPL
838824	2014 OM_{6}	—	May 31, 2014	Haleakala	Pan-STARRS 1	H	440 m	MPC · JPL
838825	2014 OE_{14}	—	July 25, 2014	Haleakala	Pan-STARRS 1	THM	1.5 km	MPC · JPL
838826	2014 OU_{16}	—	January 10, 2013	Haleakala	Pan-STARRS 1	·	1.4 km	MPC · JPL
838827	2014 OC_{18}	—	June 22, 2014	Haleakala	Pan-STARRS 1	·	1.9 km	MPC · JPL
838828	2014 OW_{22}	—	June 26, 2014	ESA OGS	ESA OGS	·	1.2 km	MPC · JPL
838829	2014 OS_{23}	—	January 20, 2012	Mount Lemmon	Mount Lemmon Survey	PAD	1.1 km	MPC · JPL
838830	2014 OZ_{23}	—	July 25, 2014	Haleakala	Pan-STARRS 1	(21885)	1.9 km	MPC · JPL
838831	2014 OL_{24}	—	July 25, 2014	Haleakala	Pan-STARRS 1	·	1.5 km	MPC · JPL
838832	2014 OO_{25}	—	July 25, 2014	Haleakala	Pan-STARRS 1	MAS	500 m	MPC · JPL
838833	2014 OD_{28}	—	April 7, 2013	Mount Lemmon	Mount Lemmon Survey	THM	1.7 km	MPC · JPL
838834	2014 OZ_{30}	—	July 25, 2014	Haleakala	Pan-STARRS 1	·	1.8 km	MPC · JPL
838835	2014 OK_{33}	—	June 27, 2014	Haleakala	Pan-STARRS 1	·	530 m	MPC · JPL
838836	2014 OG_{35}	—	June 29, 2014	Haleakala	Pan-STARRS 1	·	1.7 km	MPC · JPL
838837	2014 OH_{35}	—	July 3, 2014	Haleakala	Pan-STARRS 1	·	550 m	MPC · JPL
838838	2014 OM_{36}	—	July 25, 2014	Haleakala	Pan-STARRS 1	·	1.7 km	MPC · JPL
838839	2014 OT_{40}	—	March 8, 2013	Haleakala	Pan-STARRS 1	·	850 m	MPC · JPL
838840	2014 OE_{44}	—	January 16, 2005	Mauna Kea	Veillet, C.	MAS	490 m	MPC · JPL
838841	2014 OU_{44}	—	September 16, 2009	Mount Lemmon	Mount Lemmon Survey	·	1.3 km	MPC · JPL
838842	2014 OH_{47}	—	July 25, 2014	Haleakala	Pan-STARRS 1	·	1.5 km	MPC · JPL
838843	2014 OQ_{47}	—	September 16, 2009	Mount Lemmon	Mount Lemmon Survey	·	1.8 km	MPC · JPL
838844	2014 OS_{47}	—	June 25, 2014	Kitt Peak	Spacewatch	·	1.8 km	MPC · JPL
838845	2014 OZ_{48}	—	July 25, 2014	Haleakala	Pan-STARRS 1	·	2.0 km	MPC · JPL
838846	2014 OC_{50}	—	September 18, 2009	Mount Lemmon	Mount Lemmon Survey	·	1.9 km	MPC · JPL
838847	2014 OW_{50}	—	October 26, 2011	Haleakala	Pan-STARRS 1	·	820 m	MPC · JPL
838848	2014 OY_{50}	—	July 25, 2014	Haleakala	Pan-STARRS 1	·	1.9 km	MPC · JPL
838849	2014 OC_{51}	—	August 29, 2009	Kitt Peak	Spacewatch	·	1.6 km	MPC · JPL
838850	2014 OB_{54}	—	June 27, 2014	Haleakala	Pan-STARRS 1	·	2.1 km	MPC · JPL
838851	2014 OS_{55}	—	July 25, 2014	Haleakala	Pan-STARRS 1	EOS	1.6 km	MPC · JPL
838852	2014 OK_{59}	—	July 25, 2014	Haleakala	Pan-STARRS 1	·	1.9 km	MPC · JPL
838853	2014 OO_{60}	—	May 1, 2006	Kitt Peak	Spacewatch	·	850 m	MPC · JPL
838854	2014 OH_{61}	—	August 18, 2009	Kitt Peak	Spacewatch	·	1.8 km	MPC · JPL
838855	2014 OL_{61}	—	June 14, 2010	WISE	WISE	·	590 m	MPC · JPL
838856	2014 OS_{63}	—	July 3, 2014	Haleakala	Pan-STARRS 1	·	610 m	MPC · JPL
838857	2014 OV_{65}	—	February 17, 2010	WISE	WISE	T_{j} (2.98)	1.9 km	MPC · JPL
838858	2014 OE_{73}	—	February 28, 2014	Haleakala	Pan-STARRS 1	·	1.3 km	MPC · JPL
838859	2014 OZ_{73}	—	May 6, 2014	Haleakala	Pan-STARRS 1	·	730 m	MPC · JPL
838860	2014 OC_{75}	—	June 27, 2014	Haleakala	Pan-STARRS 1	EOS	1.5 km	MPC · JPL
838861	2014 OA_{76}	—	July 1, 2014	Haleakala	Pan-STARRS 1	·	1.8 km	MPC · JPL
838862	2014 OS_{77}	—	March 4, 2010	Kitt Peak	Spacewatch	·	530 m	MPC · JPL
838863	2014 OL_{81}	—	May 27, 2010	WISE	WISE	·	1.6 km	MPC · JPL
838864	2014 OM_{82}	—	May 10, 2010	WISE	WISE	·	1.0 km	MPC · JPL
838865	2014 OW_{82}	—	August 20, 2009	Kitt Peak	Spacewatch	·	1.4 km	MPC · JPL
838866	2014 OX_{83}	—	December 31, 2011	Kitt Peak	Spacewatch	·	2.3 km	MPC · JPL
838867	2014 OJ_{84}	—	November 8, 2010	Mount Lemmon	Mount Lemmon Survey	·	1.3 km	MPC · JPL
838868	2014 OG_{85}	—	June 30, 2014	Haleakala	Pan-STARRS 1	·	730 m	MPC · JPL
838869	2014 OG_{88}	—	July 26, 2014	Haleakala	Pan-STARRS 1	·	1.7 km	MPC · JPL
838870	2014 OU_{88}	—	July 2, 2014	Haleakala	Pan-STARRS 1	·	770 m	MPC · JPL
838871	2014 OZ_{89}	—	October 7, 2005	Kitt Peak	Spacewatch	·	700 m	MPC · JPL
838872	2014 OC_{90}	—	May 27, 2010	WISE	WISE	·	1.7 km	MPC · JPL
838873	2014 OA_{91}	—	August 17, 2009	Kitt Peak	Spacewatch	·	2.0 km	MPC · JPL
838874	2014 OB_{93}	—	July 29, 2010	WISE	WISE	DOR	1.8 km	MPC · JPL
838875	2014 ON_{94}	—	July 26, 2014	Haleakala	Pan-STARRS 1	H	360 m	MPC · JPL
838876	2014 OP_{95}	—	January 18, 2012	Mount Lemmon	Mount Lemmon Survey	MAS	620 m	MPC · JPL
838877	2014 OC_{97}	—	July 26, 2014	Haleakala	Pan-STARRS 1	·	680 m	MPC · JPL
838878	2014 OJ_{98}	—	July 26, 2014	Haleakala	Pan-STARRS 1	THB	1.7 km	MPC · JPL
838879	2014 OW_{98}	—	July 26, 2014	Haleakala	Pan-STARRS 1	·	1.4 km	MPC · JPL
838880	2014 OR_{99}	—	July 26, 2014	Haleakala	Pan-STARRS 1	·	1.7 km	MPC · JPL
838881	2014 OS_{100}	—	June 2, 2010	WISE	WISE	·	880 m	MPC · JPL
838882	2014 OZ_{100}	—	October 2, 2010	Tzec Maun	D. Chestnov, A. Novichonok	RAF	750 m	MPC · JPL
838883	2014 OE_{101}	—	February 15, 2010	WISE	WISE	·	3.2 km	MPC · JPL
838884	2014 OC_{103}	—	June 30, 2014	Mount Lemmon	Mount Lemmon Survey	·	1.3 km	MPC · JPL
838885	2014 OB_{107}	—	July 2, 2014	Haleakala	Pan-STARRS 1	(21885)	1.9 km	MPC · JPL
838886	2014 OM_{109}	—	June 27, 2014	Haleakala	Pan-STARRS 1	EUN	990 m	MPC · JPL
838887	2014 OS_{110}	—	January 19, 2010	WISE	WISE	LUT	3.2 km	MPC · JPL
838888	2014 OA_{111}	—	April 28, 2010	WISE	WISE	(5)	1.2 km	MPC · JPL
838889	2014 OC_{115}	—	July 2, 2014	Haleakala	Pan-STARRS 1	·	1.5 km	MPC · JPL
838890	2014 OC_{116}	—	March 19, 2013	Haleakala	Pan-STARRS 1	THM	1.6 km	MPC · JPL
838891	2014 OC_{117}	—	July 25, 2014	Haleakala	Pan-STARRS 1	·	1.7 km	MPC · JPL
838892	2014 OR_{117}	—	July 25, 2014	Haleakala	Pan-STARRS 1	·	450 m	MPC · JPL
838893	2014 OF_{118}	—	December 26, 2005	Mount Lemmon	Mount Lemmon Survey	·	1.3 km	MPC · JPL
838894	2014 ON_{122}	—	July 25, 2014	Haleakala	Pan-STARRS 1	·	2.0 km	MPC · JPL
838895	2014 OY_{126}	—	December 8, 1999	Kitt Peak	Spacewatch	·	820 m	MPC · JPL
838896	2014 OK_{134}	—	October 25, 2011	Haleakala	Pan-STARRS 1	·	450 m	MPC · JPL
838897	2014 OZ_{135}	—	July 27, 2014	Haleakala	Pan-STARRS 1	·	1.9 km	MPC · JPL
838898	2014 OU_{137}	—	October 5, 2002	Sacramento Peak	SDSS	·	1.1 km	MPC · JPL
838899	2014 OK_{142}	—	June 27, 2010	WISE	WISE	MIS	1.9 km	MPC · JPL
838900	2014 OU_{145}	—	September 4, 2008	Kitt Peak	Spacewatch	·	720 m	MPC · JPL

== 838901–839000 ==
back to top

Designation			Discovery			Properties		Ref
Permanent	Provisional	Named after	Date	Site	Discoverer(s)	Category	Diam.	Ref
838901	2014 OZ_{145}	—	May 12, 2010	WISE	WISE	·	3.6 km	MPC · JPL
838902	2014 OF_{147}	—	January 19, 2012	Front Royal	Skillman, D. R.	URS	2.3 km	MPC · JPL
838903	2014 OF_{148}	—	July 27, 2014	Haleakala	Pan-STARRS 1	·	1.6 km	MPC · JPL
838904	2014 OT_{148}	—	July 27, 2014	Haleakala	Pan-STARRS 1	·	1.5 km	MPC · JPL
838905	2014 OC_{150}	—	July 27, 2014	Haleakala	Pan-STARRS 1	EOS · critical	1.1 km	MPC · JPL
838906	2014 ON_{152}	—	June 30, 2014	Haleakala	Pan-STARRS 1	·	1.7 km	MPC · JPL
838907	2014 OR_{154}	—	October 11, 2010	Mount Lemmon	Mount Lemmon Survey	·	1.4 km	MPC · JPL
838908	2014 OK_{158}	—	October 14, 2001	Sacramento Peak	SDSS	·	1.2 km	MPC · JPL
838909	2014 OE_{163}	—	October 14, 2001	Sacramento Peak	SDSS	WIT	670 m	MPC · JPL
838910	2014 ON_{165}	—	January 19, 2012	Kitt Peak	Spacewatch	·	2.1 km	MPC · JPL
838911	2014 OS_{166}	—	August 15, 2009	Kitt Peak	Spacewatch	·	2.1 km	MPC · JPL
838912	2014 OV_{166}	—	March 20, 1999	Sacramento Peak	SDSS	·	2.4 km	MPC · JPL
838913	2014 OC_{169}	—	June 29, 2014	Haleakala	Pan-STARRS 1	·	1.8 km	MPC · JPL
838914	2014 OT_{169}	—	July 27, 2014	Haleakala	Pan-STARRS 1	·	980 m	MPC · JPL
838915	2014 OK_{170}	—	July 27, 2014	Haleakala	Pan-STARRS 1	·	1.7 km	MPC · JPL
838916	2014 OQ_{172}	—	February 1, 2012	Mount Lemmon	Mount Lemmon Survey	·	2.0 km	MPC · JPL
838917	2014 OX_{172}	—	January 17, 2004	Palomar	NEAT	HNS	970 m	MPC · JPL
838918	2014 OC_{174}	—	October 18, 2009	Catalina	CSS	·	1.4 km	MPC · JPL
838919	2014 OX_{174}	—	September 19, 2007	Kitt Peak	Spacewatch	·	720 m	MPC · JPL
838920	2014 OD_{176}	—	June 30, 2014	Haleakala	Pan-STARRS 1	·	570 m	MPC · JPL
838921	2014 OR_{176}	—	May 21, 2010	WISE	WISE	·	1.2 km	MPC · JPL
838922	2014 OS_{176}	—	July 27, 2014	Haleakala	Pan-STARRS 1	EMA	1.8 km	MPC · JPL
838923	2014 OQ_{179}	—	June 28, 2014	Haleakala	Pan-STARRS 1	·	2.4 km	MPC · JPL
838924	2014 OU_{179}	—	February 8, 2011	Mount Lemmon	Mount Lemmon Survey	·	2.0 km	MPC · JPL
838925	2014 OO_{180}	—	July 27, 2014	Haleakala	Pan-STARRS 1	EOS	1.4 km	MPC · JPL
838926	2014 OA_{182}	—	July 27, 2014	Haleakala	Pan-STARRS 1	·	2.2 km	MPC · JPL
838927	2014 OQ_{183}	—	June 3, 2010	Kitt Peak	Spacewatch	·	940 m	MPC · JPL
838928	2014 OZ_{183}	—	March 19, 1993	Kitt Peak	Spacewatch	·	1.2 km	MPC · JPL
838929	2014 OJ_{184}	—	July 8, 2014	Haleakala	Pan-STARRS 1	·	2.0 km	MPC · JPL
838930	2014 ON_{184}	—	July 8, 2014	Haleakala	Pan-STARRS 1	·	1.6 km	MPC · JPL
838931	2014 OW_{185}	—	January 12, 2010	WISE	WISE	·	3.6 km	MPC · JPL
838932	2014 OO_{186}	—	July 27, 2014	Haleakala	Pan-STARRS 1	·	2.4 km	MPC · JPL
838933	2014 OX_{186}	—	July 24, 2010	WISE	WISE	·	1.0 km	MPC · JPL
838934	2014 OU_{189}	—	February 26, 2010	WISE	WISE	·	2.4 km	MPC · JPL
838935	2014 OB_{190}	—	August 2, 2011	Haleakala	Pan-STARRS 1	H	480 m	MPC · JPL
838936	2014 OX_{195}	—	July 27, 2014	Haleakala	Pan-STARRS 1	·	2.6 km	MPC · JPL
838937	2014 OB_{197}	—	June 30, 2014	Mount Lemmon	Mount Lemmon Survey	·	560 m	MPC · JPL
838938	2014 OV_{200}	—	July 4, 2014	Haleakala	Pan-STARRS 1	·	1.7 km	MPC · JPL
838939	2014 OQ_{201}	—	August 29, 2009	Kitt Peak	Spacewatch	·	1.5 km	MPC · JPL
838940	2014 OO_{202}	—	July 3, 2014	Haleakala	Pan-STARRS 1	·	1.9 km	MPC · JPL
838941	2014 OQ_{203}	—	April 17, 2013	Cerro Tololo-DECam	DECam	HYG	1.6 km	MPC · JPL
838942	2014 OB_{204}	—	July 3, 2014	Haleakala	Pan-STARRS 1	·	2.2 km	MPC · JPL
838943	2014 OD_{204}	—	July 20, 2014	Tivoli	G. Lehmann, ~Knöfel, A.	·	790 m	MPC · JPL
838944	2014 OE_{206}	—	July 28, 2014	Haleakala	Pan-STARRS 1	·	420 m	MPC · JPL
838945	2014 OE_{207}	—	October 14, 2001	Sacramento Peak	SDSS	·	1.8 km	MPC · JPL
838946	2014 OZ_{207}	—	July 25, 2014	Haleakala	Pan-STARRS 1	·	1.4 km	MPC · JPL
838947	2014 OD_{214}	—	June 27, 2014	Haleakala	Pan-STARRS 1	·	2.3 km	MPC · JPL
838948	2014 OC_{218}	—	July 27, 2014	Haleakala	Pan-STARRS 1	·	2.1 km	MPC · JPL
838949	2014 OR_{218}	—	May 25, 2010	WISE	WISE	·	1.2 km	MPC · JPL
838950	2014 OS_{220}	—	July 27, 2014	Haleakala	Pan-STARRS 1	NAE	1.6 km	MPC · JPL
838951	2014 OJ_{224}	—	May 5, 2008	Mount Lemmon	Mount Lemmon Survey	EOS	1.4 km	MPC · JPL
838952	2014 OQ_{224}	—	July 27, 2014	Haleakala	Pan-STARRS 1	·	1.7 km	MPC · JPL
838953	2014 OZ_{224}	—	July 27, 2014	Haleakala	Pan-STARRS 1	EOS	1.3 km	MPC · JPL
838954	2014 OA_{226}	—	September 20, 2003	Kitt Peak	Spacewatch	THB	2.3 km	MPC · JPL
838955	2014 OC_{228}	—	July 27, 2014	Haleakala	Pan-STARRS 1	·	2.2 km	MPC · JPL
838956	2014 ON_{228}	—	July 27, 2014	Haleakala	Pan-STARRS 1	·	1.9 km	MPC · JPL
838957	2014 OU_{228}	—	July 27, 2014	Haleakala	Pan-STARRS 1	·	960 m	MPC · JPL
838958	2014 OJ_{229}	—	July 27, 2014	Haleakala	Pan-STARRS 1	·	640 m	MPC · JPL
838959	2014 OT_{233}	—	October 11, 2007	Mount Lemmon	Mount Lemmon Survey	NYS	900 m	MPC · JPL
838960	2014 OM_{237}	—	July 7, 2010	WISE	WISE	·	1.2 km	MPC · JPL
838961	2014 OC_{242}	—	April 16, 2008	Mount Lemmon	Mount Lemmon Survey	·	1.5 km	MPC · JPL
838962	2014 OM_{245}	—	December 6, 2010	Mount Lemmon	Mount Lemmon Survey	·	1.9 km	MPC · JPL
838963	2014 OR_{245}	—	May 23, 2010	WISE	WISE	·	2.1 km	MPC · JPL
838964	2014 OW_{245}	—	July 29, 2014	Haleakala	Pan-STARRS 1	·	1.1 km	MPC · JPL
838965	2014 OD_{250}	—	July 29, 2014	Haleakala	Pan-STARRS 1	·	2.1 km	MPC · JPL
838966	2014 OW_{250}	—	July 29, 2014	Haleakala	Pan-STARRS 1	·	940 m	MPC · JPL
838967	2014 OU_{255}	—	June 29, 2014	Haleakala	Pan-STARRS 1	·	470 m	MPC · JPL
838968	2014 OQ_{257}	—	February 14, 2010	Kitt Peak	Spacewatch	·	460 m	MPC · JPL
838969	2014 OK_{258}	—	June 27, 2014	Haleakala	Pan-STARRS 1	·	1.7 km	MPC · JPL
838970	2014 OE_{263}	—	June 29, 2010	WISE	WISE	·	2.2 km	MPC · JPL
838971	2014 OQ_{263}	—	July 25, 2014	Haleakala	Pan-STARRS 1	·	600 m	MPC · JPL
838972	2014 OA_{267}	—	June 27, 2014	Haleakala	Pan-STARRS 1	·	2.1 km	MPC · JPL
838973	2014 OL_{268}	—	July 4, 2014	Haleakala	Pan-STARRS 1	·	1.2 km	MPC · JPL
838974	2014 OE_{269}	—	July 29, 2014	Haleakala	Pan-STARRS 1	·	1.8 km	MPC · JPL
838975	2014 OY_{269}	—	September 28, 2009	Mount Lemmon	Mount Lemmon Survey	·	2.3 km	MPC · JPL
838976	2014 OU_{270}	—	September 17, 2003	Kitt Peak	Spacewatch	THB	2.1 km	MPC · JPL
838977	2014 OP_{271}	—	July 29, 2014	Haleakala	Pan-STARRS 1	TIR	1.6 km	MPC · JPL
838978	2014 OF_{272}	—	July 29, 2014	Haleakala	Pan-STARRS 1	·	1.6 km	MPC · JPL
838979	2014 OR_{274}	—	February 3, 2008	Mount Lemmon	Mount Lemmon Survey	·	1.7 km	MPC · JPL
838980	2014 OY_{274}	—	July 25, 2014	Haleakala	Pan-STARRS 1	·	2.0 km	MPC · JPL
838981	2014 OY_{275}	—	July 4, 2014	Haleakala	Pan-STARRS 1	·	2.0 km	MPC · JPL
838982	2014 OL_{276}	—	April 11, 2013	Mount Lemmon	Mount Lemmon Survey	EOS	1.3 km	MPC · JPL
838983	2014 OA_{277}	—	July 29, 2014	Haleakala	Pan-STARRS 1	V	450 m	MPC · JPL
838984	2014 OF_{280}	—	April 13, 2013	Kitt Peak	Spacewatch	·	2.0 km	MPC · JPL
838985	2014 OM_{282}	—	February 5, 2010	WISE	WISE	·	2.4 km	MPC · JPL
838986	2014 OK_{286}	—	June 28, 2014	Haleakala	Pan-STARRS 1	·	1.9 km	MPC · JPL
838987	2014 OE_{287}	—	July 29, 2005	Palomar	NEAT	·	1.3 km	MPC · JPL
838988	2014 OA_{288}	—	July 29, 2014	Haleakala	Pan-STARRS 1	·	2.3 km	MPC · JPL
838989	2014 OJ_{290}	—	September 18, 2010	Mount Lemmon	Mount Lemmon Survey	EUN	920 m	MPC · JPL
838990	2014 OJ_{293}	—	October 10, 2002	Sacramento Peak	SDSS	MAR	930 m	MPC · JPL
838991	2014 OM_{293}	—	July 29, 2014	Haleakala	Pan-STARRS 1	·	440 m	MPC · JPL
838992	2014 OZ_{293}	—	August 27, 2005	Palomar	NEAT	·	1.4 km	MPC · JPL
838993	2014 OH_{294}	—	September 17, 2003	Kitt Peak	Spacewatch	TIR	2.0 km	MPC · JPL
838994	2014 OD_{296}	—	July 29, 2014	Haleakala	Pan-STARRS 1	·	1.2 km	MPC · JPL
838995	2014 OC_{297}	—	February 19, 2010	WISE	WISE	·	2.9 km	MPC · JPL
838996	2014 OE_{297}	—	October 16, 2003	Kitt Peak	Spacewatch	·	1.8 km	MPC · JPL
838997	2014 OK_{298}	—	October 10, 2007	Kitt Peak	Spacewatch	NYS	650 m	MPC · JPL
838998	2014 OQ_{299}	—	July 29, 2014	Haleakala	Pan-STARRS 1	T_{j} (2.99)	2.6 km	MPC · JPL
838999	2014 OT_{300}	—	July 25, 2014	Haleakala	Pan-STARRS 1	·	2.1 km	MPC · JPL
839000	2014 OV_{301}	—	August 27, 2009	Kitt Peak	Spacewatch	·	1.7 km	MPC · JPL

back to top

== Meaning of names ==
As minor planet discoveries are confirmed, they are given a permanent number by the IAU's Minor Planet Center (MPC), and the discoverers can then submit names for them, following the IAU's naming conventions. The list below concerns those minor planets in the specified number-range that have received names, and explains the meanings of those names.

Official naming citations of newly named small Solar System bodies are approved and published in a bulletin by IAU's Working Group for Small Bodies Nomenclature (WGSBN). Before May 2021, citations were published in MPC's Minor Planet Circulars for many decades. Recent citations can also be found on the JPL Small-Body Database (SBDB). Until his death in 2016, German astronomer Lutz D. Schmadel compiled these citations into the Dictionary of Minor Planet Names (DMP) and regularly updated the collection.

Based on Paul Herget's The Names of the Minor Planets, Schmadel also researched the unclear origin of numerous asteroids, most of which had been named prior to World War II. This article incorporates text from this source, which is in the public domain: SBDB New namings may only be added to this list below after official publication as the preannouncement of names is condemned. The WGSBN publishes a comprehensive guideline for the naming rules of non-cometary small Solar System bodies.

Named minor planet	Provisional	This minor planet was named for...	Ref · Catalog
838404 Dickson	2014 GK_{50}	Dickson Despommier, American professor of Public Health and Microbiology at Columbia University.	IAU · 838404
