= List of minor planets: 629001–630000 =

The following is a partial list of minor planets, running from minor-planet number 629001 through 630000, inclusive. The primary data for this and other partial lists is based on JPL's "Small-Body Orbital Elements" and data available from the Minor Planet Center. Critical list information is also provided by the MPC, unless otherwise specified from Lowell Observatory. A detailed description of the table's columns and additional sources are given on the main page including a complete list of every page in this series, and a statistical break-up on the dynamical classification of minor planets.

Also see the summary list of all named bodies in numerical and alphabetical order, and the corresponding naming citations for the number range of this particular list. New namings may only be added to this list after official publication, as the preannouncement of names is condemned by the Working Group for Small Bodies Nomenclature of the International Astronomical Union.

| Near-Earth obj. | MBA (inner) | MBA (outer) | Centaur |
| Mars-crosser | MBA (middle) | Jupiter trojan | Trans-Neptunian obj. |
| Unclassified |

== 629001–629100 ==
| Designation | | | Discovery | | | Properties | | Ref |
| Permanent | Provisional | Named after | Date | Site | Discoverer(s) | Category | Diam. | Ref |
|---|---|---|---|---|---|---|---|---|
| 629001 | 2020 BT_{59} | — | February 17, 2015 | Haleakala | Pan-STARRS 1 | · | 2.1 km | MPC · JPL |
| 629002 | 2020 QJ_{9} | — | January 13, 2018 | Mount Lemmon | Mount Lemmon Survey | · | 560 m | MPC · JPL |
| 629003 | 2020 TS_{11} | — | November 1, 2010 | Kitt Peak | Spacewatch | · | 400 m | MPC · JPL |
| 629004 | 2020 XL_{9} | — | August 9, 2005 | Cerro Tololo | Deep Ecliptic Survey | · | 1.5 km | MPC · JPL |
| 629005 | 2021 CW_{11} | — | September 5, 2000 | Apache Point | SDSS Collaboration | · | 1.6 km | MPC · JPL |
| 629006 | 2021 EU_{14} | — | May 7, 2010 | Mount Lemmon | Mount Lemmon Survey | · | 2.8 km | MPC · JPL |
| 629007 | 2021 FT_{13} | — | October 26, 2011 | Haleakala | Pan-STARRS 1 | (5) | 800 m | MPC · JPL |
| 629008 | 2021 FK_{31} | — | September 2, 2013 | Mount Lemmon | Mount Lemmon Survey | EOS | 1.3 km | MPC · JPL |
| 629009 | 1991 SU_{3} | — | September 30, 1991 | Kitt Peak | Spacewatch | KON | 2.4 km | MPC · JPL |
| 629010 | 1991 TK_{16} | — | November 9, 1991 | Kitt Peak | Spacewatch | · | 1.4 km | MPC · JPL |
| 629011 | 1992 SS_{27} | — | November 22, 2009 | Mount Lemmon | Mount Lemmon Survey | · | 1.3 km | MPC · JPL |
| 629012 | 1992 TJ_{2} | — | March 10, 2007 | Mount Lemmon | Mount Lemmon Survey | · | 3.0 km | MPC · JPL |
| 629013 | 1992 WP_{10} | — | November 11, 2009 | Kitt Peak | Spacewatch | · | 3.3 km | MPC · JPL |
| 629014 | 1993 BZ_{9} | — | January 22, 1993 | Kitt Peak | Spacewatch | · | 1.4 km | MPC · JPL |
| 629015 | 1993 BC_{16} | — | May 14, 1997 | Kitt Peak | Spacewatch | L5 | 10 km | MPC · JPL |
| 629016 | 1993 BD_{16} | — | January 23, 2006 | Kitt Peak | Spacewatch | L5 | 7.6 km | MPC · JPL |
| 629017 | 1993 UH_{10} | — | December 18, 2003 | Kitt Peak | Spacewatch | AGN | 1.1 km | MPC · JPL |
| 629018 | 1993 VD_{6} | — | November 9, 1993 | Kitt Peak | Spacewatch | · | 570 m | MPC · JPL |
| 629019 | 1994 AX_{5} | — | January 6, 1994 | Kitt Peak | Spacewatch | EUN | 1.5 km | MPC · JPL |
| 629020 | 1994 EW_{9} | — | August 15, 2002 | Kitt Peak | Spacewatch | · | 1.1 km | MPC · JPL |
| 629021 | 1994 GU_{2} | — | April 6, 1994 | Kitt Peak | Spacewatch | · | 2.6 km | MPC · JPL |
| 629022 | 1994 GC_{12} | — | March 2, 2009 | Mount Lemmon | Mount Lemmon Survey | NYS | 1.3 km | MPC · JPL |
| 629023 | 1994 RZ_{29} | — | April 18, 2007 | Mount Lemmon | Mount Lemmon Survey | · | 1.6 km | MPC · JPL |
| 629024 | 1994 RA_{30} | — | October 30, 2006 | Mount Lemmon | Mount Lemmon Survey | TIR | 2.4 km | MPC · JPL |
| 629025 | 1994 TK_{5} | — | October 4, 1994 | Kitt Peak | Spacewatch | (16286) | 1.9 km | MPC · JPL |
| 629026 | 1994 UH_{13} | — | November 24, 2000 | Kitt Peak | Spacewatch | · | 2.8 km | MPC · JPL |
| 629027 | 1995 CV_{7} | — | February 2, 1995 | Kitt Peak | Spacewatch | EOS | 2.0 km | MPC · JPL |
| 629028 | 1995 FX_{2} | — | March 23, 1995 | Kitt Peak | Spacewatch | · | 2.1 km | MPC · JPL |
| 629029 | 1995 SS_{12} | — | September 18, 1995 | Kitt Peak | Spacewatch | EOS | 1.8 km | MPC · JPL |
| 629030 | 1995 SG_{35} | — | September 22, 1995 | Kitt Peak | Spacewatch | · | 2.1 km | MPC · JPL |
| 629031 | 1995 SX_{56} | — | September 17, 1995 | Kitt Peak | Spacewatch | VER | 2.4 km | MPC · JPL |
| 629032 | 1995 SA_{65} | — | September 19, 1995 | Kitt Peak | Spacewatch | · | 1.6 km | MPC · JPL |
| 629033 | 1995 SJ_{81} | — | September 22, 1995 | Kitt Peak | Spacewatch | · | 1.4 km | MPC · JPL |
| 629034 | 1995 SQ_{83} | — | September 24, 1995 | Kitt Peak | Spacewatch | · | 1.5 km | MPC · JPL |
| 629035 | 1995 SO_{90} | — | March 11, 2007 | Mount Lemmon | Mount Lemmon Survey | AGN | 1.1 km | MPC · JPL |
| 629036 | 1995 SR_{90} | — | August 26, 2012 | Haleakala | Pan-STARRS 1 | · | 2.7 km | MPC · JPL |
| 629037 | 1995 SZ_{90} | — | September 19, 1995 | Kitt Peak | Spacewatch | · | 2.5 km | MPC · JPL |
| 629038 | 1995 TQ_{8} | — | October 1, 1995 | Kitt Peak | Spacewatch | · | 2.5 km | MPC · JPL |
| 629039 | 1995 TS_{11} | — | October 15, 1995 | Kitt Peak | Spacewatch | · | 1.4 km | MPC · JPL |
| 629040 | 1995 UT_{56} | — | October 25, 1995 | Kitt Peak | Spacewatch | · | 1.3 km | MPC · JPL |
| 629041 | 1995 UO_{70} | — | October 19, 1995 | Kitt Peak | Spacewatch | AGN | 940 m | MPC · JPL |
| 629042 | 1995 UA_{79} | — | October 17, 1995 | Kitt Peak | Spacewatch | · | 1.4 km | MPC · JPL |
| 629043 | 1995 UZ_{80} | — | October 25, 1995 | Kitt Peak | Spacewatch | · | 1.6 km | MPC · JPL |
| 629044 | 1995 VM_{19} | — | September 16, 2003 | Kitt Peak | Spacewatch | · | 1.5 km | MPC · JPL |
| 629045 | 1995 WH_{13} | — | November 16, 1995 | Kitt Peak | Spacewatch | · | 2.1 km | MPC · JPL |
| 629046 | 1995 WR_{44} | — | November 16, 2006 | Mount Lemmon | Mount Lemmon Survey | · | 3.0 km | MPC · JPL |
| 629047 | 1996 AU_{20} | — | April 26, 2003 | Kitt Peak | Spacewatch | · | 860 m | MPC · JPL |
| 629048 | 1996 BL_{5} | — | January 18, 1996 | Kitt Peak | Spacewatch | · | 2.3 km | MPC · JPL |
| 629049 | 1996 BK_{10} | — | January 21, 1996 | Kitt Peak | Spacewatch | · | 1.2 km | MPC · JPL |
| 629050 | 1996 CS_{9} | — | June 17, 2013 | Haleakala | Pan-STARRS 1 | · | 1.4 km | MPC · JPL |
| 629051 | 1996 FQ_{9} | — | March 20, 1996 | Kitt Peak | Spacewatch | · | 1.9 km | MPC · JPL |
| 629052 | 1996 HM_{27} | — | April 21, 1996 | Kitt Peak | Spacewatch | · | 1.4 km | MPC · JPL |
| 629053 | 1996 RP_{8} | — | September 6, 1996 | Kitt Peak | Spacewatch | L4 | 8.4 km | MPC · JPL |
| 629054 | 1996 SG_{9} | — | November 10, 2004 | Kitt Peak | Spacewatch | MAS | 780 m | MPC · JPL |
| 629055 | 1996 TC_{28} | — | October 7, 1996 | Kitt Peak | Spacewatch | · | 2.5 km | MPC · JPL |
| 629056 | 1996 TO_{32} | — | October 10, 1996 | Kitt Peak | Spacewatch | V | 600 m | MPC · JPL |
| 629057 | 1996 TM_{35} | — | October 11, 1996 | Kitt Peak | Spacewatch | · | 1.7 km | MPC · JPL |
| 629058 | 1996 TM_{44} | — | October 6, 1996 | Kitt Peak | Spacewatch | · | 1.5 km | MPC · JPL |
| 629059 | 1996 TT_{69} | — | September 25, 2012 | Mount Lemmon | Mount Lemmon Survey | · | 2.5 km | MPC · JPL |
| 629060 | 1996 VW_{32} | — | November 5, 1996 | Kitt Peak | Spacewatch | · | 1.4 km | MPC · JPL |
| 629061 | 1996 XX_{24} | — | December 9, 1996 | Kitt Peak | Spacewatch | WIT | 1.3 km | MPC · JPL |
| 629062 | 1996 XX_{37} | — | December 7, 1996 | Kitt Peak | Spacewatch | · | 3.2 km | MPC · JPL |
| 629063 | 1996 XZ_{37} | — | October 4, 2011 | Piszkéstető | K. Sárneczky | · | 1.5 km | MPC · JPL |
| 629064 | 1997 CW_{3} | — | February 3, 1997 | Kitt Peak | Spacewatch | · | 1.1 km | MPC · JPL |
| 629065 | 1997 CC_{31} | — | December 28, 2005 | Kitt Peak | Spacewatch | · | 2.2 km | MPC · JPL |
| 629066 | 1997 EJ_{10} | — | March 7, 1997 | Kitt Peak | Spacewatch | HYG | 2.8 km | MPC · JPL |
| 629067 | 1997 EJ_{60} | — | November 5, 2005 | Mount Lemmon | Mount Lemmon Survey | EOS | 2.2 km | MPC · JPL |
| 629068 | 1997 EK_{60} | — | January 20, 2008 | Kitt Peak | Spacewatch | · | 2.7 km | MPC · JPL |
| 629069 | 1997 HM_{18} | — | September 22, 2009 | Kitt Peak | Spacewatch | V | 630 m | MPC · JPL |
| 629070 | 1997 JN_{19} | — | October 23, 2006 | Mount Lemmon | Mount Lemmon Survey | · | 3.6 km | MPC · JPL |
| 629071 | 1997 UL_{13} | — | October 23, 1997 | Kitt Peak | Spacewatch | EOS | 1.6 km | MPC · JPL |
| 629072 | 1997 WK_{10} | — | November 21, 1997 | Kitt Peak | Spacewatch | · | 2.1 km | MPC · JPL |
| 629073 | 1998 AN_{3} | — | January 2, 1998 | Kitt Peak | Spacewatch | · | 2.1 km | MPC · JPL |
| 629074 | 1998 BM_{39} | — | January 29, 1998 | Kitt Peak | Spacewatch | · | 2.2 km | MPC · JPL |
| 629075 | 1998 KC_{17} | — | May 26, 1998 | Kitt Peak | Spacewatch | · | 830 m | MPC · JPL |
| 629076 | 1998 KF_{69} | — | April 30, 2009 | Kitt Peak | Spacewatch | · | 3.1 km | MPC · JPL |
| 629077 | 1998 SA_{21} | — | September 21, 1998 | Kitt Peak | Spacewatch | MAS | 860 m | MPC · JPL |
| 629078 | 1998 SM_{44} | — | September 24, 1998 | Kitt Peak | Spacewatch | · | 1 km | MPC · JPL |
| 629079 | 1998 SB_{179} | — | September 25, 2008 | Mount Lemmon | Mount Lemmon Survey | · | 1.3 km | MPC · JPL |
| 629080 | 1998 TV_{7} | — | October 13, 1998 | Kitt Peak | Spacewatch | · | 1.1 km | MPC · JPL |
| 629081 | 1998 VQ_{41} | — | November 14, 1998 | Kitt Peak | Spacewatch | · | 1.2 km | MPC · JPL |
| 629082 | 1998 WK_{42} | — | November 14, 1998 | Kitt Peak | Spacewatch | · | 3.4 km | MPC · JPL |
| 629083 | 1998 WM_{46} | — | October 28, 2010 | Mount Lemmon | Mount Lemmon Survey | L4 | 8.1 km | MPC · JPL |
| 629084 | 1998 WV_{46} | — | November 21, 2008 | Kitt Peak | Spacewatch | KOR | 1.1 km | MPC · JPL |
| 629085 | 1999 AR_{27} | — | January 10, 1999 | Kitt Peak | Spacewatch | · | 1.5 km | MPC · JPL |
| 629086 | 1999 AT_{39} | — | January 7, 1999 | Kitt Peak | Spacewatch | · | 1.1 km | MPC · JPL |
| 629087 | 1999 BR_{35} | — | June 26, 2015 | Haleakala | Pan-STARRS 1 | · | 1.2 km | MPC · JPL |
| 629088 | 1999 CU_{152} | — | February 12, 1999 | Kitt Peak | Spacewatch | · | 1.2 km | MPC · JPL |
| 629089 | 1999 CF_{160} | — | March 11, 2003 | Kitt Peak | Spacewatch | · | 1.1 km | MPC · JPL |
| 629090 | 1999 FA_{98} | — | September 19, 2001 | Kitt Peak | Spacewatch | · | 2.1 km | MPC · JPL |
| 629091 | 1999 FH_{98} | — | March 18, 2010 | Mount Lemmon | Mount Lemmon Survey | · | 2.5 km | MPC · JPL |
| 629092 | 1999 FK_{98} | — | April 11, 2003 | Kitt Peak | Spacewatch | NYS | 1.1 km | MPC · JPL |
| 629093 | 1999 FT_{98} | — | June 22, 2011 | Mount Lemmon | Mount Lemmon Survey | · | 1.1 km | MPC · JPL |
| 629094 | 1999 FU_{98} | — | August 19, 2006 | Kitt Peak | Spacewatch | · | 2.3 km | MPC · JPL |
| 629095 | 1999 FW_{98} | — | September 11, 2007 | Mount Lemmon | Mount Lemmon Survey | · | 2.8 km | MPC · JPL |
| 629096 | 1999 FP_{100} | — | January 21, 2015 | Kitt Peak | Spacewatch | EOS | 1.9 km | MPC · JPL |
| 629097 | 1999 FR_{100} | — | January 16, 2015 | Haleakala | Pan-STARRS 1 | · | 2.6 km | MPC · JPL |
| 629098 | 1999 GO_{55} | — | April 7, 1999 | Kitt Peak | Spacewatch | · | 3.1 km | MPC · JPL |
| 629099 | 1999 HH_{13} | — | April 1, 2009 | Mount Lemmon | Mount Lemmon Survey | · | 750 m | MPC · JPL |
| 629100 | 1999 NX | — | July 9, 1999 | Woomera | F. B. Zoltowski | · | 3.4 km | MPC · JPL |

== 629101–629200 ==
back to top

| Designation | | | Discovery | | | Properties | | Ref |
| Permanent | Provisional | Named after | Date | Site | Discoverer(s) | Category | Diam. | Ref |
|---|---|---|---|---|---|---|---|---|
| 629101 | 1999 PE_{9} | — | October 9, 2012 | Nogales | M. Schwartz, P. R. Holvorcem | · | 1.6 km | MPC · JPL |
| 629102 | 1999 RD_{245} | — | September 6, 1999 | Kitt Peak | Spacewatch | · | 710 m | MPC · JPL |
| 629103 | 1999 RX_{260} | — | November 4, 2011 | Mount Lemmon | Mount Lemmon Survey | · | 2.6 km | MPC · JPL |
| 629104 | 1999 TS_{43} | — | January 29, 2011 | Mount Lemmon | Mount Lemmon Survey | · | 1.6 km | MPC · JPL |
| 629105 | 1999 TH_{51} | — | October 4, 1999 | Kitt Peak | Spacewatch | · | 540 m | MPC · JPL |
| 629106 | 1999 TV_{54} | — | October 6, 1999 | Kitt Peak | Spacewatch | · | 720 m | MPC · JPL |
| 629107 | 1999 TW_{77} | — | March 7, 2008 | Catalina | CSS | MAS | 790 m | MPC · JPL |
| 629108 | 1999 TB_{84} | — | October 13, 1999 | Kitt Peak | Spacewatch | · | 1.6 km | MPC · JPL |
| 629109 | 1999 TR_{302} | — | October 4, 1999 | Kitt Peak | Spacewatch | · | 1.9 km | MPC · JPL |
| 629110 | 1999 TF_{308} | — | March 20, 2007 | Kitt Peak | Spacewatch | · | 1.6 km | MPC · JPL |
| 629111 | 1999 TJ_{325} | — | November 11, 2004 | Kitt Peak | Spacewatch | · | 2.1 km | MPC · JPL |
| 629112 | 1999 TK_{337} | — | September 23, 2008 | Kitt Peak | Spacewatch | WIT | 1.1 km | MPC · JPL |
| 629113 | 1999 TL_{337} | — | September 29, 2008 | Mount Lemmon | Mount Lemmon Survey | · | 1.9 km | MPC · JPL |
| 629114 | 1999 TW_{337} | — | September 5, 2008 | Kitt Peak | Spacewatch | · | 1.9 km | MPC · JPL |
| 629115 | 1999 TO_{340} | — | May 12, 2012 | Mount Lemmon | Mount Lemmon Survey | · | 2.3 km | MPC · JPL |
| 629116 | 1999 TV_{340} | — | November 21, 2009 | Kitt Peak | Spacewatch | · | 1.8 km | MPC · JPL |
| 629117 | 1999 UM_{21} | — | October 31, 1999 | Kitt Peak | Spacewatch | · | 1.6 km | MPC · JPL |
| 629118 | 1999 UU_{22} | — | October 31, 1999 | Kitt Peak | Spacewatch | KOR | 1.5 km | MPC · JPL |
| 629119 | 1999 UU_{64} | — | October 5, 2004 | Kitt Peak | Spacewatch | KOR | 1.1 km | MPC · JPL |
| 629120 | 1999 UM_{65} | — | November 19, 2006 | Kitt Peak | Spacewatch | · | 3.4 km | MPC · JPL |
| 629121 | 1999 VE_{83} | — | November 1, 1999 | Kitt Peak | Spacewatch | KOR | 1.3 km | MPC · JPL |
| 629122 | 1999 VE_{124} | — | November 6, 1999 | Kitt Peak | Spacewatch | · | 2.6 km | MPC · JPL |
| 629123 | 1999 VZ_{129} | — | November 11, 1999 | Kitt Peak | Spacewatch | NYS | 1.2 km | MPC · JPL |
| 629124 | 1999 VN_{212} | — | November 12, 1999 | Socorro | LINEAR | EUN | 1.1 km | MPC · JPL |
| 629125 | 1999 VO_{219} | — | November 4, 1999 | Kitt Peak | Spacewatch | (5) | 850 m | MPC · JPL |
| 629126 | 1999 VP_{232} | — | November 1, 2006 | Kitt Peak | Spacewatch | · | 550 m | MPC · JPL |
| 629127 | 1999 WB_{22} | — | October 6, 2008 | Mount Lemmon | Mount Lemmon Survey | · | 1.8 km | MPC · JPL |
| 629128 | 1999 WX_{23} | — | November 17, 1999 | Kitt Peak | Spacewatch | · | 1.4 km | MPC · JPL |
| 629129 | 1999 WD_{28} | — | October 7, 2008 | Kitt Peak | Spacewatch | · | 1.9 km | MPC · JPL |
| 629130 | 1999 WF_{28} | — | March 6, 2011 | Mount Lemmon | Mount Lemmon Survey | KOR | 1.3 km | MPC · JPL |
| 629131 | 1999 WL_{28} | — | October 15, 2007 | Mount Lemmon | Mount Lemmon Survey | · | 950 m | MPC · JPL |
| 629132 | 1999 WN_{28} | — | September 6, 2008 | Mount Lemmon | Mount Lemmon Survey | KOR | 1.1 km | MPC · JPL |
| 629133 | 1999 WZ_{28} | — | June 14, 2018 | Haleakala | Pan-STARRS 1 | EOS | 1.5 km | MPC · JPL |
| 629134 | 1999 XX_{67} | — | November 9, 1999 | Socorro | LINEAR | · | 3.1 km | MPC · JPL |
| 629135 | 1999 XR_{148} | — | December 7, 1999 | Kitt Peak | Spacewatch | KOR | 1.6 km | MPC · JPL |
| 629136 | 1999 XD_{150} | — | December 8, 1999 | Kitt Peak | Spacewatch | KOR | 1.6 km | MPC · JPL |
| 629137 | 1999 XY_{255} | — | December 5, 1999 | Kitt Peak | Spacewatch | EOS | 1.8 km | MPC · JPL |
| 629138 | 1999 XS_{265} | — | October 27, 2006 | Mount Lemmon | Mount Lemmon Survey | · | 740 m | MPC · JPL |
| 629139 | 1999 XT_{265} | — | March 6, 2011 | Mount Lemmon | Mount Lemmon Survey | KOR | 1.5 km | MPC · JPL |
| 629140 | 1999 XV_{265} | — | November 20, 2009 | Mount Lemmon | Mount Lemmon Survey | · | 830 m | MPC · JPL |
| 629141 Mihalikenikő | 1999 YN_{17} | Mihalikenikő | December 31, 1999 | Piszkéstető | L. Kiss, K. Sárneczky | · | 3.5 km | MPC · JPL |
| 629142 | 2000 AL_{84} | — | January 5, 2000 | Socorro | LINEAR | · | 1.3 km | MPC · JPL |
| 629143 | 2000 AS_{207} | — | September 18, 2009 | Mount Lemmon | Mount Lemmon Survey | MAS | 730 m | MPC · JPL |
| 629144 | 2000 AO_{221} | — | January 5, 2000 | Kitt Peak | Spacewatch | · | 1.2 km | MPC · JPL |
| 629145 | 2000 AR_{221} | — | January 8, 2000 | Kitt Peak | Spacewatch | · | 850 m | MPC · JPL |
| 629146 | 2000 AN_{247} | — | January 2, 2000 | Kitt Peak | Spacewatch | · | 870 m | MPC · JPL |
| 629147 | 2000 AL_{258} | — | December 19, 2004 | Mount Lemmon | Mount Lemmon Survey | HOF | 2.7 km | MPC · JPL |
| 629148 | 2000 AX_{258} | — | December 4, 2007 | Mount Lemmon | Mount Lemmon Survey | · | 1.4 km | MPC · JPL |
| 629149 | 2000 AJ_{259} | — | September 1, 2014 | Catalina | CSS | · | 1.2 km | MPC · JPL |
| 629150 | 2000 BV_{36} | — | January 30, 2000 | Kitt Peak | Spacewatch | EOS | 2.2 km | MPC · JPL |
| 629151 | 2000 BR_{43} | — | January 28, 2000 | Kitt Peak | Spacewatch | · | 1.2 km | MPC · JPL |
| 629152 | 2000 BK_{52} | — | December 16, 1999 | Kitt Peak | Spacewatch | · | 1.1 km | MPC · JPL |
| 629153 | 2000 BM_{53} | — | December 15, 1999 | Kitt Peak | Spacewatch | L4 | 7.8 km | MPC · JPL |
| 629154 | 2000 BP_{53} | — | January 27, 2000 | Kitt Peak | Spacewatch | (5) | 930 m | MPC · JPL |
| 629155 | 2000 CV_{69} | — | February 1, 2000 | Kitt Peak | Spacewatch | · | 2.8 km | MPC · JPL |
| 629156 | 2000 CT_{126} | — | February 1, 2000 | Kitt Peak | Spacewatch | · | 930 m | MPC · JPL |
| 629157 | 2000 CH_{150} | — | October 10, 2008 | Mount Lemmon | Mount Lemmon Survey | · | 3.4 km | MPC · JPL |
| 629158 | 2000 CW_{150} | — | January 13, 2005 | Kitt Peak | Spacewatch | EOS | 2.0 km | MPC · JPL |
| 629159 | 2000 CM_{151} | — | November 20, 2008 | Kitt Peak | Spacewatch | KOR | 1.2 km | MPC · JPL |
| 629160 | 2000 CR_{151} | — | September 15, 2007 | Mount Lemmon | Mount Lemmon Survey | AGN | 1.0 km | MPC · JPL |
| 629161 | 2000 CQ_{155} | — | April 17, 2013 | Haleakala | Pan-STARRS 1 | · | 1.0 km | MPC · JPL |
| 629162 | 2000 CM_{156} | — | February 20, 2009 | Kitt Peak | Spacewatch | · | 1.4 km | MPC · JPL |
| 629163 | 2000 DD_{50} | — | February 29, 2000 | Socorro | LINEAR | · | 2.3 km | MPC · JPL |
| 629164 | 2000 EU_{2} | — | March 3, 2000 | Kitt Peak | Spacewatch | · | 1.3 km | MPC · JPL |
| 629165 | 2000 EA_{9} | — | March 3, 2000 | Socorro | LINEAR | · | 1.3 km | MPC · JPL |
| 629166 | 2000 ET_{74} | — | February 27, 2000 | Kitt Peak | Spacewatch | EUN | 1.2 km | MPC · JPL |
| 629167 | 2000 EM_{102} | — | March 14, 2000 | Kitt Peak | Spacewatch | · | 1.0 km | MPC · JPL |
| 629168 | 2000 ER_{177} | — | March 3, 2000 | Kitt Peak | Spacewatch | · | 1.4 km | MPC · JPL |
| 629169 | 2000 EJ_{189} | — | March 3, 2000 | Socorro | LINEAR | NYS | 1.2 km | MPC · JPL |
| 629170 | 2000 EK_{204} | — | March 6, 2000 | Cerro Tololo | Deep Lens Survey | · | 1.8 km | MPC · JPL |
| 629171 | 2000 EQ_{209} | — | November 26, 2014 | Haleakala | Pan-STARRS 1 | EOS | 2.0 km | MPC · JPL |
| 629172 | 2000 EQ_{210} | — | January 10, 2007 | Mount Lemmon | Mount Lemmon Survey | V | 610 m | MPC · JPL |
| 629173 | 2000 ES_{210} | — | November 24, 2011 | Mount Lemmon | Mount Lemmon Survey | · | 1.9 km | MPC · JPL |
| 629174 | 2000 EW_{210} | — | November 10, 2013 | Kitt Peak | Spacewatch | EOS | 1.7 km | MPC · JPL |
| 629175 | 2000 ER_{211} | — | October 1, 2014 | Haleakala | Pan-STARRS 1 | · | 3.0 km | MPC · JPL |
| 629176 | 2000 EF_{212} | — | November 1, 2006 | Kitt Peak | Spacewatch | · | 1.4 km | MPC · JPL |
| 629177 | 2000 FW_{72} | — | March 25, 2000 | Kitt Peak | Spacewatch | · | 1.4 km | MPC · JPL |
| 629178 | 2000 FN_{74} | — | October 2, 2005 | Mount Lemmon | Mount Lemmon Survey | (2076) | 720 m | MPC · JPL |
| 629179 | 2000 FQ_{74} | — | August 27, 2014 | Haleakala | Pan-STARRS 1 | · | 1.1 km | MPC · JPL |
| 629180 | 2000 GE_{146} | — | April 12, 2000 | Kitt Peak | Spacewatch | · | 3.4 km | MPC · JPL |
| 629181 | 2000 GB_{188} | — | October 28, 2014 | Mount Lemmon | Mount Lemmon Survey | · | 2.7 km | MPC · JPL |
| 629182 | 2000 GX_{188} | — | January 21, 2012 | Catalina | CSS | · | 1.6 km | MPC · JPL |
| 629183 | 2000 GO_{189} | — | April 12, 2000 | Kitt Peak | Spacewatch | THM | 2.0 km | MPC · JPL |
| 629184 | 2000 HM | — | April 24, 2000 | Kitt Peak | Spacewatch | THM | 2.6 km | MPC · JPL |
| 629185 | 2000 HJ_{31} | — | April 29, 2000 | Socorro | LINEAR | · | 3.2 km | MPC · JPL |
| 629186 | 2000 JF_{75} | — | April 26, 2000 | Kitt Peak | Spacewatch | · | 2.8 km | MPC · JPL |
| 629187 | 2000 JR_{95} | — | May 30, 2006 | Kitt Peak | Spacewatch | · | 2.3 km | MPC · JPL |
| 629188 | 2000 JP_{97} | — | February 19, 2015 | Haleakala | Pan-STARRS 1 | · | 1.4 km | MPC · JPL |
| 629189 | 2000 KS_{84} | — | April 2, 2005 | Kitt Peak | Spacewatch | EOS | 2.1 km | MPC · JPL |
| 629190 | 2000 KU_{84} | — | September 4, 2008 | Kitt Peak | Spacewatch | NYS | 1.0 km | MPC · JPL |
| 629191 | 2000 ME_{7} | — | June 30, 2000 | La Silla | Barbieri, C. | · | 1.1 km | MPC · JPL |
| 629192 | 2000 OQ_{62} | — | July 30, 2000 | Cerro Tololo | Deep Ecliptic Survey | NYS | 1.0 km | MPC · JPL |
| 629193 | 2000 OA_{70} | — | December 28, 2002 | Kitt Peak | Spacewatch | · | 2.9 km | MPC · JPL |
| 629194 | 2000 OB_{70} | — | October 7, 2012 | Haleakala | Pan-STARRS 1 | HYG | 2.5 km | MPC · JPL |
| 629195 | 2000 OD_{73} | — | December 11, 2013 | Haleakala | Pan-STARRS 1 | · | 2.3 km | MPC · JPL |
| 629196 | 2000 PU_{33} | — | October 22, 1995 | Kitt Peak | Spacewatch | · | 2.4 km | MPC · JPL |
| 629197 | 2000 QO_{38} | — | August 24, 2000 | Socorro | LINEAR | NYS | 1.3 km | MPC · JPL |
| 629198 | 2000 QE_{225} | — | August 29, 2000 | Socorro | LINEAR | · | 1.2 km | MPC · JPL |
| 629199 | 2000 QH_{242} | — | August 27, 2000 | Cerro Tololo | Deep Ecliptic Survey | AGN | 990 m | MPC · JPL |
| 629200 | 2000 QM_{244} | — | August 24, 2000 | Socorro | LINEAR | (5) | 1.3 km | MPC · JPL |

== 629201–629300 ==
back to top

| Designation | | | Discovery | | | Properties | | Ref |
| Permanent | Provisional | Named after | Date | Site | Discoverer(s) | Category | Diam. | Ref |
|---|---|---|---|---|---|---|---|---|
| 629201 | 2000 QA_{255} | — | August 20, 2000 | Kitt Peak | Spacewatch | · | 1.1 km | MPC · JPL |
| 629202 | 2000 QM_{255} | — | April 27, 2009 | Kitt Peak | Spacewatch | · | 1.0 km | MPC · JPL |
| 629203 | 2000 QX_{255} | — | January 19, 2012 | Kitt Peak | Spacewatch | · | 460 m | MPC · JPL |
| 629204 | 2000 QA_{259} | — | March 2, 2012 | Kitt Peak | Spacewatch | WIT | 760 m | MPC · JPL |
| 629205 | 2000 QS_{259} | — | November 6, 2008 | Mount Lemmon | Mount Lemmon Survey | NYS | 1.2 km | MPC · JPL |
| 629206 | 2000 RL_{108} | — | January 18, 2008 | Kitt Peak | Spacewatch | VER | 2.6 km | MPC · JPL |
| 629207 | 2000 RF_{109} | — | January 10, 2011 | Kitt Peak | Spacewatch | · | 1.4 km | MPC · JPL |
| 629208 | 2000 RV_{110} | — | May 5, 2006 | Anderson Mesa | LONEOS | · | 770 m | MPC · JPL |
| 629209 | 2000 SP_{159} | — | September 27, 2000 | Kitt Peak | Spacewatch | · | 2.5 km | MPC · JPL |
| 629210 | 2000 SS_{196} | — | September 24, 2000 | Socorro | LINEAR | · | 2.4 km | MPC · JPL |
| 629211 | 2000 SX_{285} | — | September 24, 2000 | Socorro | LINEAR | · | 1.5 km | MPC · JPL |
| 629212 | 2000 SN_{324} | — | September 28, 2000 | Kitt Peak | Spacewatch | · | 690 m | MPC · JPL |
| 629213 | 2000 SO_{350} | — | October 2, 2000 | Anderson Mesa | LONEOS | PHO | 1.2 km | MPC · JPL |
| 629214 | 2000 ST_{377} | — | July 3, 2003 | Kitt Peak | Spacewatch | · | 700 m | MPC · JPL |
| 629215 | 2000 SG_{378} | — | August 30, 2011 | Haleakala | Pan-STARRS 1 | · | 2.7 km | MPC · JPL |
| 629216 | 2000 SR_{379} | — | March 16, 2012 | Mount Lemmon | Mount Lemmon Survey | · | 1.5 km | MPC · JPL |
| 629217 | 2000 SY_{379} | — | March 17, 2015 | Haleakala | Pan-STARRS 1 | · | 3.3 km | MPC · JPL |
| 629218 | 2000 SC_{380} | — | March 18, 2009 | Mount Lemmon | Mount Lemmon Survey | · | 2.8 km | MPC · JPL |
| 629219 | 2000 SO_{382} | — | September 24, 2017 | Mount Lemmon | Mount Lemmon Survey | · | 2.4 km | MPC · JPL |
| 629220 | 2000 SL_{384} | — | January 7, 2016 | Haleakala | Pan-STARRS 1 | · | 1.6 km | MPC · JPL |
| 629221 | 2000 SS_{386} | — | September 26, 2000 | Kitt Peak | Spacewatch | VER | 2.4 km | MPC · JPL |
| 629222 | 2000 SC_{387} | — | September 19, 2000 | Kitt Peak | Deep Ecliptic Survey | L5 | 6.3 km | MPC · JPL |
| 629223 | 2000 TK_{25} | — | October 2, 2000 | Socorro | LINEAR | · | 1.4 km | MPC · JPL |
| 629224 | 2000 TJ_{47} | — | October 4, 2000 | Kitt Peak | Spacewatch | · | 2.2 km | MPC · JPL |
| 629225 | 2000 TF_{49} | — | September 11, 2000 | Bergisch Gladbach | W. Bickel | · | 1.7 km | MPC · JPL |
| 629226 | 2000 TX_{56} | — | October 2, 2000 | Socorro | LINEAR | NYS | 960 m | MPC · JPL |
| 629227 | 2000 TJ_{69} | — | October 4, 2000 | Kitt Peak | Spacewatch | · | 1.5 km | MPC · JPL |
| 629228 | 2000 TC_{75} | — | February 10, 2007 | Mount Lemmon | Mount Lemmon Survey | · | 1.8 km | MPC · JPL |
| 629229 | 2000 TG_{75} | — | September 20, 2011 | Kitt Peak | Spacewatch | · | 1.2 km | MPC · JPL |
| 629230 | 2000 TK_{75} | — | August 18, 2009 | Kitt Peak | Spacewatch | AGN | 1.0 km | MPC · JPL |
| 629231 | 2000 TH_{76} | — | December 19, 2007 | Mount Lemmon | Mount Lemmon Survey | · | 1.9 km | MPC · JPL |
| 629232 | 2000 TQ_{77} | — | January 29, 2009 | Mount Lemmon | Mount Lemmon Survey | · | 2.8 km | MPC · JPL |
| 629233 | 2000 TW_{78} | — | November 10, 2010 | Kitt Peak | Spacewatch | · | 2.3 km | MPC · JPL |
| 629234 | 2000 TY_{78} | — | September 30, 2009 | Mount Lemmon | Mount Lemmon Survey | · | 1.9 km | MPC · JPL |
| 629235 | 2000 TE_{79} | — | March 15, 2012 | Mount Lemmon | Mount Lemmon Survey | · | 1.5 km | MPC · JPL |
| 629236 | 2000 TH_{80} | — | October 3, 2013 | Haleakala | Pan-STARRS 1 | L5 | 6.8 km | MPC · JPL |
| 629237 | 2000 TX_{80} | — | September 20, 2001 | Kitt Peak | Spacewatch | L5 | 7.8 km | MPC · JPL |
| 629238 | 2000 TX_{81} | — | April 15, 2007 | Mount Lemmon | Mount Lemmon Survey | L5 | 7.7 km | MPC · JPL |
| 629239 | 2000 UM_{32} | — | October 29, 2000 | Kitt Peak | Spacewatch | · | 1.3 km | MPC · JPL |
| 629240 | 2000 UQ_{35} | — | October 24, 2000 | Socorro | LINEAR | · | 1.8 km | MPC · JPL |
| 629241 | 2000 UB_{115} | — | May 30, 2009 | Mount Lemmon | Mount Lemmon Survey | · | 1.8 km | MPC · JPL |
| 629242 | 2000 WW_{27} | — | November 25, 2000 | Kitt Peak | Spacewatch | · | 1.1 km | MPC · JPL |
| 629243 | 2000 WE_{52} | — | November 27, 2000 | Kitt Peak | Spacewatch | AGN | 1.1 km | MPC · JPL |
| 629244 | 2000 WY_{52} | — | November 27, 2000 | Kitt Peak | Spacewatch | · | 1.9 km | MPC · JPL |
| 629245 | 2000 WE_{128} | — | November 2, 2000 | Socorro | LINEAR | · | 1.8 km | MPC · JPL |
| 629246 | 2000 WM_{194} | — | November 25, 2000 | Kitt Peak | Deep Lens Survey | · | 2.5 km | MPC · JPL |
| 629247 | 2000 WG_{199} | — | September 12, 2004 | Kitt Peak | Spacewatch | · | 2.7 km | MPC · JPL |
| 629248 | 2000 WK_{199} | — | October 9, 2004 | Socorro | LINEAR | · | 1.5 km | MPC · JPL |
| 629249 | 2000 WQ_{202} | — | March 20, 2007 | Mount Lemmon | Mount Lemmon Survey | · | 1.9 km | MPC · JPL |
| 629250 | 2000 YE_{141} | — | December 20, 2000 | Kitt Peak | Deep Lens Survey | · | 2.6 km | MPC · JPL |
| 629251 | 2000 YT_{145} | — | October 4, 2013 | Catalina | CSS | · | 2.1 km | MPC · JPL |
| 629252 | 2001 BM_{84} | — | December 9, 2004 | Kitt Peak | Spacewatch | · | 1.5 km | MPC · JPL |
| 629253 | 2001 CM_{50} | — | February 1, 2009 | Kitt Peak | Spacewatch | · | 1.1 km | MPC · JPL |
| 629254 | 2001 CW_{50} | — | December 5, 2010 | Mount Lemmon | Mount Lemmon Survey | · | 580 m | MPC · JPL |
| 629255 | 2001 DH_{84} | — | February 23, 2001 | Cerro Tololo | Deep Lens Survey | · | 1.5 km | MPC · JPL |
| 629256 | 2001 DC_{86} | — | February 25, 2001 | Cerro Tololo | Deep Lens Survey | · | 710 m | MPC · JPL |
| 629257 | 2001 DV_{112} | — | November 2, 2011 | Mount Lemmon | Mount Lemmon Survey | · | 3.7 km | MPC · JPL |
| 629258 | 2001 DA_{113} | — | February 11, 2015 | Mount Lemmon | Mount Lemmon Survey | · | 670 m | MPC · JPL |
| 629259 | 2001 DS_{113} | — | February 13, 2002 | Kitt Peak | Spacewatch | L4 | 7.6 km | MPC · JPL |
| 629260 | 2001 DB_{114} | — | July 28, 2011 | Haleakala | Pan-STARRS 1 | · | 890 m | MPC · JPL |
| 629261 | 2001 DE_{114} | — | November 21, 2009 | Kitt Peak | Spacewatch | · | 1.8 km | MPC · JPL |
| 629262 | 2001 DO_{118} | — | April 27, 2001 | Kitt Peak | Spacewatch | KON | 2.4 km | MPC · JPL |
| 629263 | 2001 DU_{118} | — | May 23, 2014 | Haleakala | Pan-STARRS 1 | · | 1.1 km | MPC · JPL |
| 629264 | 2001 DV_{119} | — | September 20, 2014 | Haleakala | Pan-STARRS 1 | · | 1.9 km | MPC · JPL |
| 629265 | 2001 EC_{19} | — | March 14, 2001 | Kitt Peak | Spacewatch | EUN | 1.3 km | MPC · JPL |
| 629266 | 2001 FL_{84} | — | March 26, 2001 | Kitt Peak | Spacewatch | EOS | 1.9 km | MPC · JPL |
| 629267 | 2001 FW_{85} | — | March 26, 2001 | Cerro Tololo | Deep Lens Survey | · | 850 m | MPC · JPL |
| 629268 | 2001 FN_{89} | — | March 27, 2001 | Kitt Peak | Spacewatch | · | 1.8 km | MPC · JPL |
| 629269 | 2001 FX_{125} | — | March 28, 2001 | Kitt Peak | Spacewatch | · | 2.3 km | MPC · JPL |
| 629270 | 2001 FJ_{126} | — | March 29, 2001 | Kitt Peak | Spacewatch | V | 500 m | MPC · JPL |
| 629271 | 2001 FR_{204} | — | September 17, 2003 | Kitt Peak | Spacewatch | KOR | 1.0 km | MPC · JPL |
| 629272 | 2001 FH_{219} | — | March 21, 2001 | Kitt Peak | SKADS | KOR | 1.1 km | MPC · JPL |
| 629273 | 2001 FD_{230} | — | March 4, 2006 | Kitt Peak | Spacewatch | KOR | 1.6 km | MPC · JPL |
| 629274 | 2001 FA_{244} | — | January 30, 2011 | Haleakala | Pan-STARRS 1 | · | 2.0 km | MPC · JPL |
| 629275 | 2001 FH_{246} | — | February 6, 2016 | Haleakala | Pan-STARRS 1 | EOS | 1.5 km | MPC · JPL |
| 629276 | 2001 GX_{11} | — | April 11, 2005 | Mount Lemmon | Mount Lemmon Survey | NYS | 1.2 km | MPC · JPL |
| 629277 | 2001 HF_{70} | — | March 21, 2001 | Haleakala | NEAT | · | 1.3 km | MPC · JPL |
| 629278 | 2001 KB_{79} | — | September 25, 2008 | Kitt Peak | Spacewatch | · | 2.3 km | MPC · JPL |
| 629279 | 2001 KS_{79} | — | October 18, 2009 | Mount Lemmon | Mount Lemmon Survey | · | 990 m | MPC · JPL |
| 629280 | 2001 KQ_{83} | — | April 1, 2005 | Kitt Peak | Spacewatch | · | 1.1 km | MPC · JPL |
| 629281 | 2001 KG_{84} | — | November 6, 2013 | Haleakala | Pan-STARRS 1 | EOS | 1.6 km | MPC · JPL |
| 629282 | 2001 KH_{87} | — | October 8, 2008 | Kitt Peak | Spacewatch | KOR | 1.1 km | MPC · JPL |
| 629283 | 2001 KF_{88} | — | February 20, 2015 | Mount Lemmon | Mount Lemmon Survey | KOR | 1.3 km | MPC · JPL |
| 629284 | 2001 KR_{88} | — | June 8, 2012 | Mount Lemmon | Mount Lemmon Survey | · | 2.4 km | MPC · JPL |
| 629285 | 2001 LH_{20} | — | May 27, 2012 | Mount Lemmon | Mount Lemmon Survey | EOS | 2.4 km | MPC · JPL |
| 629286 | 2001 MM_{17} | — | June 26, 2001 | Kitt Peak | Spacewatch | · | 2.5 km | MPC · JPL |
| 629287 | 2001 NB_{19} | — | June 28, 2001 | Kitt Peak | Spacewatch | · | 1.1 km | MPC · JPL |
| 629288 | 2001 OQ_{44} | — | July 23, 2001 | Palomar | NEAT | · | 2.2 km | MPC · JPL |
| 629289 | 2001 OK_{78} | — | July 26, 2001 | Palomar | NEAT | · | 760 m | MPC · JPL |
| 629290 | 2001 OZ_{82} | — | July 27, 2001 | Palomar | NEAT | · | 2.1 km | MPC · JPL |
| 629291 | 2001 OH_{114} | — | September 23, 2012 | Mount Lemmon | Mount Lemmon Survey | · | 960 m | MPC · JPL |
| 629292 | 2001 PX_{3} | — | August 9, 2001 | Palomar | NEAT | · | 1.7 km | MPC · JPL |
| 629293 | 2001 PN_{16} | — | July 30, 2001 | Palomar | NEAT | · | 1.6 km | MPC · JPL |
| 629294 | 2001 PK_{44} | — | August 15, 2001 | Haleakala | NEAT | · | 1.5 km | MPC · JPL |
| 629295 | 2001 PK_{48} | — | August 7, 2001 | Haleakala | NEAT | · | 4.2 km | MPC · JPL |
| 629296 | 2001 PJ_{61} | — | August 13, 2001 | Haleakala | NEAT | · | 1.8 km | MPC · JPL |
| 629297 | 2001 PS_{67} | — | November 22, 2006 | Mount Lemmon | Mount Lemmon Survey | · | 2.0 km | MPC · JPL |
| 629298 | 2001 QQ_{95} | — | August 22, 2001 | Kitt Peak | Spacewatch | · | 2.7 km | MPC · JPL |
| 629299 | 2001 QU_{188} | — | August 22, 2001 | Kitt Peak | Spacewatch | · | 1.6 km | MPC · JPL |
| 629300 | 2001 QW_{189} | — | August 22, 2001 | Socorro | LINEAR | EUN | 1.1 km | MPC · JPL |

== 629301–629400 ==
back to top

| Designation | | | Discovery | | | Properties | | Ref |
| Permanent | Provisional | Named after | Date | Site | Discoverer(s) | Category | Diam. | Ref |
|---|---|---|---|---|---|---|---|---|
| 629301 | 2001 QL_{202} | — | August 16, 2001 | Socorro | LINEAR | MAS | 860 m | MPC · JPL |
| 629302 | 2001 QM_{208} | — | August 12, 2001 | Haleakala | NEAT | · | 2.6 km | MPC · JPL |
| 629303 | 2001 QO_{210} | — | May 22, 2001 | Cerro Tololo | Deep Ecliptic Survey | · | 1.5 km | MPC · JPL |
| 629304 | 2001 QY_{224} | — | August 24, 2001 | Palomar | NEAT | NYS | 1.1 km | MPC · JPL |
| 629305 | 2001 QZ_{269} | — | July 14, 2001 | Haleakala | NEAT | · | 1.6 km | MPC · JPL |
| 629306 | 2001 QP_{281} | — | August 17, 2001 | Palomar | NEAT | · | 3.9 km | MPC · JPL |
| 629307 | 2001 QH_{327} | — | August 25, 2001 | Anderson Mesa | LONEOS | · | 2.0 km | MPC · JPL |
| 629308 | 2001 QN_{336} | — | October 13, 2005 | Kitt Peak | Spacewatch | · | 780 m | MPC · JPL |
| 629309 | 2001 RK_{21} | — | August 1, 2001 | Palomar | NEAT | MAR | 1.2 km | MPC · JPL |
| 629310 | 2001 RR_{41} | — | September 11, 2001 | Socorro | LINEAR | · | 2.9 km | MPC · JPL |
| 629311 | 2001 RE_{59} | — | August 25, 2001 | Palomar | NEAT | · | 1.6 km | MPC · JPL |
| 629312 | 2001 RL_{156} | — | September 12, 2001 | Kitt Peak | Spacewatch | · | 1.4 km | MPC · JPL |
| 629313 | 2001 RA_{158} | — | December 15, 2006 | Bergisch Gladbach | W. Bickel | · | 1.4 km | MPC · JPL |
| 629314 | 2001 SJ_{97} | — | September 20, 2001 | Socorro | LINEAR | · | 3.0 km | MPC · JPL |
| 629315 | 2001 SX_{180} | — | August 11, 2001 | Haleakala | NEAT | · | 1.2 km | MPC · JPL |
| 629316 | 2001 SC_{191} | — | September 19, 2001 | Socorro | LINEAR | · | 1.2 km | MPC · JPL |
| 629317 | 2001 SX_{199} | — | September 19, 2001 | Socorro | LINEAR | · | 1.4 km | MPC · JPL |
| 629318 | 2001 SE_{200} | — | August 24, 2001 | Kitt Peak | Spacewatch | CLA | 1.4 km | MPC · JPL |
| 629319 | 2001 SN_{210} | — | September 19, 2001 | Socorro | LINEAR | · | 2.5 km | MPC · JPL |
| 629320 | 2001 SC_{259} | — | September 20, 2001 | Socorro | LINEAR | · | 2.4 km | MPC · JPL |
| 629321 | 2001 SW_{259} | — | September 20, 2001 | Socorro | LINEAR | · | 1.8 km | MPC · JPL |
| 629322 | 2001 SY_{284} | — | September 22, 2001 | Kitt Peak | Spacewatch | · | 1.7 km | MPC · JPL |
| 629323 | 2001 SG_{290} | — | September 29, 2001 | Palomar | NEAT | · | 2.4 km | MPC · JPL |
| 629324 | 2001 SR_{301} | — | September 20, 2001 | Socorro | LINEAR | · | 680 m | MPC · JPL |
| 629325 | 2001 SZ_{322} | — | September 25, 2001 | Socorro | LINEAR | EUN | 1.2 km | MPC · JPL |
| 629326 | 2001 SQ_{335} | — | September 20, 2001 | Socorro | LINEAR | · | 1.9 km | MPC · JPL |
| 629327 | 2001 SM_{355} | — | September 26, 2001 | Palomar | NEAT | · | 1.1 km | MPC · JPL |
| 629328 | 2001 SU_{355} | — | September 27, 2001 | Palomar | NEAT | · | 1.3 km | MPC · JPL |
| 629329 | 2001 SA_{356} | — | July 27, 2005 | Siding Spring | SSS | · | 1.8 km | MPC · JPL |
| 629330 | 2001 SP_{356} | — | September 30, 2005 | Mount Lemmon | Mount Lemmon Survey | · | 1.1 km | MPC · JPL |
| 629331 | 2001 SQ_{356} | — | October 11, 2001 | Palomar | NEAT | MAR | 1.3 km | MPC · JPL |
| 629332 | 2001 SW_{356} | — | April 15, 2004 | Catalina | CSS | · | 1.9 km | MPC · JPL |
| 629333 | 2001 SF_{357} | — | September 18, 2001 | Kitt Peak | Spacewatch | · | 1.3 km | MPC · JPL |
| 629334 | 2001 ST_{357} | — | March 15, 2010 | Kitt Peak | Spacewatch | EOS | 1.8 km | MPC · JPL |
| 629335 | 2001 SC_{358} | — | January 3, 2016 | Haleakala | Pan-STARRS 1 | · | 1.4 km | MPC · JPL |
| 629336 | 2001 SL_{358} | — | August 23, 2014 | Haleakala | Pan-STARRS 1 | · | 1.3 km | MPC · JPL |
| 629337 | 2001 SO_{358} | — | September 2, 2014 | Haleakala | Pan-STARRS 1 | · | 1.8 km | MPC · JPL |
| 629338 | 2001 ST_{358} | — | October 10, 2012 | Mount Lemmon | Mount Lemmon Survey | · | 2.1 km | MPC · JPL |
| 629339 | 2001 SL_{360} | — | October 11, 2007 | Kitt Peak | Spacewatch | · | 3.2 km | MPC · JPL |
| 629340 | 2001 SQ_{360} | — | August 25, 2012 | Kitt Peak | Spacewatch | EOS | 2.0 km | MPC · JPL |
| 629341 | 2001 SL_{361} | — | December 30, 2008 | Mount Lemmon | Mount Lemmon Survey | · | 2.7 km | MPC · JPL |
| 629342 | 2001 SL_{363} | — | December 29, 2008 | Mount Lemmon | Mount Lemmon Survey | · | 3.4 km | MPC · JPL |
| 629343 | 2001 TR_{5} | — | October 10, 2001 | Palomar | NEAT | · | 1.8 km | MPC · JPL |
| 629344 | 2001 TN_{108} | — | October 14, 2001 | Socorro | LINEAR | · | 3.2 km | MPC · JPL |
| 629345 | 2001 TU_{126} | — | October 13, 2001 | Kitt Peak | Spacewatch | L5 | 7.9 km | MPC · JPL |
| 629346 | 2001 TD_{143} | — | October 10, 2001 | Palomar | NEAT | · | 2.6 km | MPC · JPL |
| 629347 | 2001 TO_{163} | — | October 11, 2001 | Palomar | NEAT | V | 740 m | MPC · JPL |
| 629348 | 2001 TS_{209} | — | October 15, 2001 | Kitt Peak | Spacewatch | · | 1.4 km | MPC · JPL |
| 629349 | 2001 TW_{222} | — | October 14, 2001 | Kitt Peak | Spacewatch | · | 1.3 km | MPC · JPL |
| 629350 | 2001 TL_{236} | — | October 16, 2001 | Socorro | LINEAR | · | 3.9 km | MPC · JPL |
| 629351 | 2001 TA_{258} | — | October 10, 2001 | Palomar | NEAT | · | 1.3 km | MPC · JPL |
| 629352 | 2001 TH_{262} | — | August 29, 2001 | Bergisch Gladbach | W. Bickel | · | 1.6 km | MPC · JPL |
| 629353 | 2001 TM_{262} | — | September 18, 2001 | Apache Point | SDSS Collaboration | · | 1.7 km | MPC · JPL |
| 629354 | 2001 TZ_{263} | — | October 26, 2005 | Kitt Peak | Spacewatch | · | 1.6 km | MPC · JPL |
| 629355 | 2001 TJ_{264} | — | March 13, 2010 | Mount Lemmon | Mount Lemmon Survey | · | 2.9 km | MPC · JPL |
| 629356 | 2001 TQ_{264} | — | October 11, 2001 | Kitt Peak | Spacewatch | · | 2.8 km | MPC · JPL |
| 629357 | 2001 TS_{266} | — | September 18, 1995 | Kitt Peak | Spacewatch | · | 2.0 km | MPC · JPL |
| 629358 | 2001 TT_{269} | — | October 15, 2001 | Kitt Peak | Spacewatch | · | 1.5 km | MPC · JPL |
| 629359 | 2001 TE_{270} | — | October 15, 2001 | Apache Point | SDSS Collaboration | · | 2.2 km | MPC · JPL |
| 629360 | 2001 UR_{4} | — | October 21, 2001 | Emerald Lane | L. Ball | · | 1.7 km | MPC · JPL |
| 629361 | 2001 UA_{20} | — | October 16, 2001 | Palomar | NEAT | · | 1.5 km | MPC · JPL |
| 629362 | 2001 UP_{70} | — | October 17, 2001 | Kitt Peak | Spacewatch | · | 1.5 km | MPC · JPL |
| 629363 | 2001 US_{71} | — | October 20, 2001 | Kitt Peak | Spacewatch | WIT | 920 m | MPC · JPL |
| 629364 | 2001 UW_{90} | — | October 23, 2001 | Kitt Peak | Spacewatch | · | 1.4 km | MPC · JPL |
| 629365 | 2001 UX_{90} | — | October 23, 2001 | Kitt Peak | Spacewatch | · | 1.9 km | MPC · JPL |
| 629366 | 2001 UA_{97} | — | October 17, 2001 | Socorro | LINEAR | · | 1.5 km | MPC · JPL |
| 629367 | 2001 UF_{102} | — | October 20, 2001 | Socorro | LINEAR | MAS | 780 m | MPC · JPL |
| 629368 | 2001 UO_{103} | — | October 20, 2001 | Socorro | LINEAR | THM | 2.4 km | MPC · JPL |
| 629369 | 2001 UL_{133} | — | October 21, 2001 | Socorro | LINEAR | · | 3.8 km | MPC · JPL |
| 629370 | 2001 UG_{166} | — | October 20, 2001 | Kitt Peak | Spacewatch | EOS | 1.9 km | MPC · JPL |
| 629371 | 2001 UC_{178} | — | October 24, 2001 | Socorro | LINEAR | · | 1.5 km | MPC · JPL |
| 629372 | 2001 UT_{187} | — | October 17, 2001 | Palomar | NEAT | EOS | 2.2 km | MPC · JPL |
| 629373 | 2001 US_{193} | — | October 10, 2001 | Palomar | NEAT | EOS | 2.4 km | MPC · JPL |
| 629374 | 2001 US_{194} | — | October 18, 2001 | Palomar | NEAT | · | 1.6 km | MPC · JPL |
| 629375 | 2001 UW_{197} | — | October 21, 2001 | Kitt Peak | Spacewatch | · | 2.8 km | MPC · JPL |
| 629376 | 2001 UM_{202} | — | October 21, 2001 | Socorro | LINEAR | · | 1.7 km | MPC · JPL |
| 629377 | 2001 UH_{207} | — | September 28, 1994 | Kitt Peak | Spacewatch | · | 620 m | MPC · JPL |
| 629378 | 2001 UY_{208} | — | October 20, 2001 | Socorro | LINEAR | MAS | 750 m | MPC · JPL |
| 629379 | 2001 UG_{225} | — | September 10, 2007 | Kitt Peak | Spacewatch | THM | 2.4 km | MPC · JPL |
| 629380 | 2001 UC_{226} | — | October 16, 2001 | Palomar | NEAT | TIR | 2.7 km | MPC · JPL |
| 629381 | 2001 UT_{228} | — | November 12, 2001 | Apache Point | SDSS | · | 2.3 km | MPC · JPL |
| 629382 | 2001 UC_{229} | — | April 7, 2008 | Kitt Peak | Spacewatch | L5 | 8.3 km | MPC · JPL |
| 629383 | 2001 UC_{231} | — | March 2, 2008 | Mount Lemmon | Mount Lemmon Survey | · | 2.2 km | MPC · JPL |
| 629384 | 2001 UN_{231} | — | October 15, 2001 | Apache Point | SDSS Collaboration | · | 3.1 km | MPC · JPL |
| 629385 | 2001 UX_{231} | — | April 12, 2004 | Kitt Peak | Spacewatch | · | 3.2 km | MPC · JPL |
| 629386 | 2001 UU_{232} | — | November 2, 2007 | Kitt Peak | Spacewatch | EOS | 2.0 km | MPC · JPL |
| 629387 | 2001 UY_{232} | — | December 14, 2013 | Haleakala | Pan-STARRS 1 | EOS | 1.7 km | MPC · JPL |
| 629388 | 2001 UK_{233} | — | March 13, 2010 | Mount Lemmon | Mount Lemmon Survey | NYS | 1.1 km | MPC · JPL |
| 629389 | 2001 UY_{233} | — | November 8, 2007 | Mount Lemmon | Mount Lemmon Survey | · | 2.7 km | MPC · JPL |
| 629390 | 2001 UM_{234} | — | August 21, 2008 | Kitt Peak | Spacewatch | 3:2 · SHU | 6.1 km | MPC · JPL |
| 629391 | 2001 UA_{237} | — | September 1, 2005 | Kitt Peak | Spacewatch | · | 1.3 km | MPC · JPL |
| 629392 | 2001 UG_{237} | — | August 26, 2017 | Haleakala | Pan-STARRS 1 | · | 2.3 km | MPC · JPL |
| 629393 | 2001 UH_{240} | — | August 26, 2012 | Haleakala | Pan-STARRS 1 | · | 2.4 km | MPC · JPL |
| 629394 | 2001 VH_{3} | — | November 9, 2001 | Kitt Peak | Spacewatch | EOS | 2.3 km | MPC · JPL |
| 629395 | 2001 VO_{73} | — | November 12, 2001 | Kitt Peak | Spacewatch | WIT | 920 m | MPC · JPL |
| 629396 | 2001 VT_{91} | — | November 12, 2001 | Haleakala | NEAT | · | 1.6 km | MPC · JPL |
| 629397 | 2001 VB_{134} | — | November 12, 2001 | Apache Point | SDSS Collaboration | VER | 2.2 km | MPC · JPL |
| 629398 | 2001 VM_{134} | — | September 21, 1995 | Kitt Peak | Spacewatch | · | 2.8 km | MPC · JPL |
| 629399 | 2001 VB_{136} | — | November 2, 2007 | Kitt Peak | Spacewatch | · | 2.6 km | MPC · JPL |
| 629400 | 2001 VJ_{136} | — | October 20, 2012 | Haleakala | Pan-STARRS 1 | · | 2.9 km | MPC · JPL |

== 629401–629500 ==
back to top

| Designation | | | Discovery | | | Properties | | Ref |
| Permanent | Provisional | Named after | Date | Site | Discoverer(s) | Category | Diam. | Ref |
|---|---|---|---|---|---|---|---|---|
| 629401 | 2001 WJ_{42} | — | November 18, 2001 | Socorro | LINEAR | · | 1.6 km | MPC · JPL |
| 629402 | 2001 WB_{67} | — | November 20, 2001 | Socorro | LINEAR | PAD | 1.9 km | MPC · JPL |
| 629403 | 2001 WW_{68} | — | November 11, 2001 | Kitt Peak | Spacewatch | · | 2.9 km | MPC · JPL |
| 629404 | 2001 WM_{74} | — | November 20, 2001 | Socorro | LINEAR | · | 3.2 km | MPC · JPL |
| 629405 | 2001 WG_{77} | — | November 20, 2001 | Socorro | LINEAR | EOS | 1.9 km | MPC · JPL |
| 629406 | 2001 WL_{84} | — | November 20, 2001 | Socorro | LINEAR | · | 2.0 km | MPC · JPL |
| 629407 | 2001 WU_{105} | — | August 26, 2014 | Haleakala | Pan-STARRS 1 | · | 1.6 km | MPC · JPL |
| 629408 | 2001 WC_{106} | — | February 3, 2009 | Mount Lemmon | Mount Lemmon Survey | · | 2.4 km | MPC · JPL |
| 629409 | 2001 XA_{131} | — | December 14, 2001 | Socorro | LINEAR | · | 1.4 km | MPC · JPL |
| 629410 | 2001 XJ_{253} | — | November 20, 2001 | Socorro | LINEAR | · | 3.1 km | MPC · JPL |
| 629411 | 2001 XV_{264} | — | December 14, 2001 | Socorro | LINEAR | · | 1.7 km | MPC · JPL |
| 629412 | 2001 XV_{268} | — | April 23, 2014 | Mount Lemmon | Mount Lemmon Survey | · | 1.7 km | MPC · JPL |
| 629413 | 2001 YV_{141} | — | December 17, 2001 | Socorro | LINEAR | · | 1.8 km | MPC · JPL |
| 629414 | 2001 YF_{163} | — | September 26, 2006 | Catalina | CSS | · | 2.7 km | MPC · JPL |
| 629415 | 2001 YQ_{164} | — | April 4, 2003 | Kitt Peak | Spacewatch | HYG | 2.7 km | MPC · JPL |
| 629416 | 2002 AU_{210} | — | January 14, 2002 | Anderson Mesa | LONEOS | · | 1.2 km | MPC · JPL |
| 629417 | 2002 AS_{211} | — | August 27, 2011 | Haleakala | Pan-STARRS 1 | · | 2.6 km | MPC · JPL |
| 629418 | 2002 AU_{211} | — | November 20, 2014 | Haleakala | Pan-STARRS 1 | · | 1.6 km | MPC · JPL |
| 629419 | 2002 AY_{213} | — | February 3, 2012 | Mount Lemmon | Mount Lemmon Survey | · | 610 m | MPC · JPL |
| 629420 | 2002 AQ_{216} | — | April 22, 2009 | Kitt Peak | Spacewatch | · | 3.1 km | MPC · JPL |
| 629421 | 2002 AR_{216} | — | September 19, 2014 | Haleakala | Pan-STARRS 1 | · | 1.5 km | MPC · JPL |
| 629422 | 2002 BO_{33} | — | January 12, 2011 | Mount Lemmon | Mount Lemmon Survey | · | 1.9 km | MPC · JPL |
| 629423 | 2002 CB_{89} | — | February 7, 2002 | Socorro | LINEAR | · | 1.3 km | MPC · JPL |
| 629424 | 2002 CD_{231} | — | February 14, 2002 | Cerro Tololo | Deep Lens Survey | 615 | 1.5 km | MPC · JPL |
| 629425 | 2002 CK_{231} | — | February 14, 2002 | Cerro Tololo | Deep Lens Survey | · | 2.8 km | MPC · JPL |
| 629426 | 2002 CR_{231} | — | February 15, 2002 | Cerro Tololo | Deep Lens Survey | · | 3.5 km | MPC · JPL |
| 629427 | 2002 CN_{235} | — | February 12, 2002 | Kitt Peak | Spacewatch | · | 1 km | MPC · JPL |
| 629428 | 2002 CW_{250} | — | February 6, 2002 | Kitt Peak | Deep Ecliptic Survey | · | 1.5 km | MPC · JPL |
| 629429 | 2002 CM_{267} | — | February 7, 2002 | Kitt Peak | Spacewatch | HOF | 2.4 km | MPC · JPL |
| 629430 | 2002 CH_{271} | — | February 10, 2002 | Socorro | LINEAR | · | 1.6 km | MPC · JPL |
| 629431 | 2002 CK_{317} | — | February 7, 2002 | Palomar | NEAT | · | 3.3 km | MPC · JPL |
| 629432 | 2002 CZ_{318} | — | February 13, 2002 | Apache Point | SDSS Collaboration | · | 3.4 km | MPC · JPL |
| 629433 | 2002 DJ_{21} | — | October 5, 2013 | Haleakala | Pan-STARRS 1 | GEF | 1.3 km | MPC · JPL |
| 629434 | 2002 EE_{36} | — | January 14, 2002 | Kitt Peak | Spacewatch | · | 2.2 km | MPC · JPL |
| 629435 | 2002 EU_{37} | — | March 9, 2002 | Kitt Peak | Spacewatch | · | 780 m | MPC · JPL |
| 629436 | 2002 EQ_{76} | — | March 11, 2002 | Kitt Peak | Spacewatch | HOF | 2.7 km | MPC · JPL |
| 629437 | 2002 EH_{114} | — | March 10, 2002 | Kitt Peak | Spacewatch | · | 2.2 km | MPC · JPL |
| 629438 | 2002 EN_{133} | — | March 13, 2002 | Socorro | LINEAR | · | 2.1 km | MPC · JPL |
| 629439 | 2002 EO_{144} | — | March 13, 2002 | Palomar | NEAT | L4 | 10 km | MPC · JPL |
| 629440 | 2002 EY_{163} | — | February 6, 2002 | Anderson Mesa | LONEOS | · | 1.4 km | MPC · JPL |
| 629441 | 2002 ET_{165} | — | March 11, 2007 | Kitt Peak | Spacewatch | · | 1.8 km | MPC · JPL |
| 629442 | 2002 EG_{169} | — | February 13, 2011 | Mount Lemmon | Mount Lemmon Survey | · | 1.7 km | MPC · JPL |
| 629443 | 2002 EA_{171} | — | September 18, 2009 | Kitt Peak | Spacewatch | L4 | 7.2 km | MPC · JPL |
| 629444 | 2002 FC_{28} | — | March 20, 2002 | Kitt Peak | Spacewatch | · | 700 m | MPC · JPL |
| 629445 | 2002 FX_{41} | — | April 25, 2007 | Mount Lemmon | Mount Lemmon Survey | GEF | 1.5 km | MPC · JPL |
| 629446 | 2002 FF_{43} | — | February 12, 2018 | Haleakala | Pan-STARRS 1 | · | 740 m | MPC · JPL |
| 629447 | 2002 GY_{27} | — | April 6, 2002 | Cerro Tololo | Deep Ecliptic Survey | KOR | 1.3 km | MPC · JPL |
| 629448 | 2002 GJ_{28} | — | March 5, 2002 | Kitt Peak | Spacewatch | · | 1.7 km | MPC · JPL |
| 629449 | 2002 GC_{30} | — | April 7, 2002 | Cerro Tololo | Deep Ecliptic Survey | · | 740 m | MPC · JPL |
| 629450 | 2002 GN_{47} | — | April 4, 2002 | Kitt Peak | Spacewatch | · | 1.8 km | MPC · JPL |
| 629451 | 2002 GP_{163} | — | September 3, 2008 | Kitt Peak | Spacewatch | L4 | 7.6 km | MPC · JPL |
| 629452 | 2002 GN_{191} | — | August 16, 2006 | Palomar | NEAT | · | 960 m | MPC · JPL |
| 629453 | 2002 GP_{193} | — | April 1, 2012 | Mount Lemmon | Mount Lemmon Survey | · | 580 m | MPC · JPL |
| 629454 | 2002 GX_{193} | — | September 25, 2008 | Mount Lemmon | Mount Lemmon Survey | · | 1.9 km | MPC · JPL |
| 629455 | 2002 GH_{197} | — | September 18, 2009 | Kitt Peak | Spacewatch | L4 · ERY | 7.2 km | MPC · JPL |
| 629456 | 2002 GE_{198} | — | April 8, 2002 | Kitt Peak | Spacewatch | KOR | 1.1 km | MPC · JPL |
| 629457 | 2002 HU_{18} | — | November 28, 2013 | Kitt Peak | Spacewatch | · | 2.0 km | MPC · JPL |
| 629458 | 2002 JB_{86} | — | May 11, 2002 | Socorro | LINEAR | · | 1.4 km | MPC · JPL |
| 629459 | 2002 JT_{153} | — | January 17, 2015 | Haleakala | Pan-STARRS 1 | · | 730 m | MPC · JPL |
| 629460 | 2002 KT_{11} | — | May 17, 2002 | Palomar | NEAT | · | 870 m | MPC · JPL |
| 629461 | 2002 KJ_{15} | — | May 18, 2002 | Palomar | NEAT | · | 1.6 km | MPC · JPL |
| 629462 | 2002 KT_{16} | — | November 30, 2003 | Kitt Peak | Spacewatch | · | 1.5 km | MPC · JPL |
| 629463 | 2002 LC_{48} | — | June 12, 2002 | Palomar | NEAT | · | 1.7 km | MPC · JPL |
| 629464 | 2002 LY_{62} | — | September 9, 2008 | Kitt Peak | Spacewatch | · | 2.0 km | MPC · JPL |
| 629465 | 2002 LU_{63} | — | June 1, 2002 | Palomar | NEAT | · | 1.6 km | MPC · JPL |
| 629466 | 2002 LG_{64} | — | February 23, 2006 | Anderson Mesa | LONEOS | · | 2.6 km | MPC · JPL |
| 629467 | 2002 LF_{65} | — | September 14, 1998 | Socorro | LINEAR | · | 1.4 km | MPC · JPL |
| 629468 | 2002 LT_{65} | — | April 29, 2014 | Haleakala | Pan-STARRS 1 | · | 990 m | MPC · JPL |
| 629469 | 2002 MQ_{7} | — | January 18, 2004 | Kitt Peak | Spacewatch | · | 1.6 km | MPC · JPL |
| 629470 | 2002 MZ_{7} | — | December 1, 2008 | Kitt Peak | Spacewatch | · | 2.7 km | MPC · JPL |
| 629471 | 2002 MF_{8} | — | October 20, 2007 | Kitt Peak | Spacewatch | · | 1.3 km | MPC · JPL |
| 629472 | 2002 NO_{30} | — | June 24, 2002 | Palomar | NEAT | · | 1.6 km | MPC · JPL |
| 629473 | 2002 NT_{48} | — | July 4, 2002 | Palomar | NEAT | · | 2.2 km | MPC · JPL |
| 629474 | 2002 NE_{65} | — | July 9, 2002 | Palomar | NEAT | EOS | 1.7 km | MPC · JPL |
| 629475 | 2002 ND_{67} | — | July 8, 2002 | Palomar | NEAT | · | 1.5 km | MPC · JPL |
| 629476 | 2002 NR_{70} | — | July 9, 2002 | Palomar | NEAT | · | 1.2 km | MPC · JPL |
| 629477 | 2002 NC_{77} | — | February 8, 2008 | Kitt Peak | Spacewatch | V | 630 m | MPC · JPL |
| 629478 | 2002 ND_{77} | — | August 13, 2002 | Palomar | NEAT | V | 610 m | MPC · JPL |
| 629479 | 2002 NO_{78} | — | April 4, 2005 | Piszkéstető | K. Sárneczky | NYS | 920 m | MPC · JPL |
| 629480 | 2002 NM_{79} | — | January 16, 2009 | Kitt Peak | Spacewatch | · | 1.4 km | MPC · JPL |
| 629481 | 2002 NP_{80} | — | January 19, 2005 | Kitt Peak | Spacewatch | · | 2.0 km | MPC · JPL |
| 629482 | 2002 NT_{80} | — | July 7, 2002 | Kitt Peak | Spacewatch | · | 920 m | MPC · JPL |
| 629483 | 2002 NY_{80} | — | January 18, 2009 | Kitt Peak | Spacewatch | · | 1.6 km | MPC · JPL |
| 629484 | 2002 ND_{83} | — | August 5, 2002 | Palomar | NEAT | · | 2.1 km | MPC · JPL |
| 629485 | 2002 NG_{83} | — | February 9, 2005 | Anderson Mesa | LONEOS | EOS | 2.3 km | MPC · JPL |
| 629486 | 2002 OX_{8} | — | July 12, 2002 | Palomar | NEAT | · | 2.6 km | MPC · JPL |
| 629487 | 2002 OF_{34} | — | January 7, 2010 | Kitt Peak | Spacewatch | · | 2.0 km | MPC · JPL |
| 629488 | 2002 OR_{34} | — | November 19, 2007 | Mount Lemmon | Mount Lemmon Survey | · | 1.2 km | MPC · JPL |
| 629489 | 2002 OW_{34} | — | July 18, 2002 | Palomar | NEAT | · | 1.8 km | MPC · JPL |
| 629490 | 2002 OE_{36} | — | December 14, 2004 | Kitt Peak | Spacewatch | EOS | 2.3 km | MPC · JPL |
| 629491 | 2002 OM_{37} | — | November 10, 2006 | Kitt Peak | Spacewatch | · | 740 m | MPC · JPL |
| 629492 | 2002 PJ_{5} | — | July 21, 2002 | Palomar | NEAT | EOS | 2.2 km | MPC · JPL |
| 629493 | 2002 PG_{12} | — | June 17, 2002 | Kitt Peak | Spacewatch | · | 2.3 km | MPC · JPL |
| 629494 | 2002 PE_{31} | — | August 6, 2002 | Palomar | NEAT | · | 2.6 km | MPC · JPL |
| 629495 | 2002 PH_{32} | — | August 6, 2002 | Palomar | NEAT | (5) | 1.2 km | MPC · JPL |
| 629496 | 2002 PA_{114} | — | July 22, 2002 | Palomar | NEAT | (5) | 1.3 km | MPC · JPL |
| 629497 | 2002 PH_{144} | — | August 9, 2002 | Cerro Tololo | Deep Ecliptic Survey | · | 840 m | MPC · JPL |
| 629498 | 2002 PK_{146} | — | August 9, 2002 | Cerro Tololo | Deep Ecliptic Survey | KOR | 1.3 km | MPC · JPL |
| 629499 | 2002 PE_{152} | — | August 13, 2002 | Palomar | NEAT | · | 1.8 km | MPC · JPL |
| 629500 | 2002 PN_{158} | — | August 8, 2002 | Palomar | NEAT | · | 2.5 km | MPC · JPL |

== 629501–629600 ==
back to top

| Designation | | | Discovery | | | Properties | | Ref |
| Permanent | Provisional | Named after | Date | Site | Discoverer(s) | Category | Diam. | Ref |
|---|---|---|---|---|---|---|---|---|
| 629501 | 2002 PB_{162} | — | August 12, 2002 | Cerro Tololo | Deep Ecliptic Survey | · | 2.8 km | MPC · JPL |
| 629502 | 2002 PB_{175} | — | August 11, 2002 | Palomar | NEAT | · | 800 m | MPC · JPL |
| 629503 | 2002 PE_{175} | — | August 11, 2002 | Palomar | NEAT | · | 1.5 km | MPC · JPL |
| 629504 | 2002 PJ_{175} | — | August 11, 2002 | Palomar | NEAT | EOS | 2.2 km | MPC · JPL |
| 629505 | 2002 PB_{185} | — | August 13, 2002 | Palomar | NEAT | · | 1.1 km | MPC · JPL |
| 629506 | 2002 PT_{185} | — | August 8, 2002 | Palomar | NEAT | · | 1.9 km | MPC · JPL |
| 629507 | 2002 PE_{190} | — | August 6, 2002 | Palomar | NEAT | · | 2.6 km | MPC · JPL |
| 629508 | 2002 PU_{194} | — | September 2, 2008 | Kitt Peak | Spacewatch | THM | 2.2 km | MPC · JPL |
| 629509 | 2002 PG_{198} | — | August 11, 2002 | Palomar | NEAT | · | 1.7 km | MPC · JPL |
| 629510 | 2002 PB_{199} | — | October 22, 2008 | Kitt Peak | Spacewatch | · | 2.2 km | MPC · JPL |
| 629511 | 2002 PN_{200} | — | December 18, 2003 | Kitt Peak | Spacewatch | · | 2.1 km | MPC · JPL |
| 629512 | 2002 PT_{202} | — | August 29, 2002 | Palomar | NEAT | MAR | 1.1 km | MPC · JPL |
| 629513 | 2002 PW_{203} | — | January 30, 2004 | Kitt Peak | Spacewatch | V | 720 m | MPC · JPL |
| 629514 | 2002 PX_{203} | — | April 15, 2005 | Kitt Peak | Spacewatch | V | 560 m | MPC · JPL |
| 629515 | 2002 PX_{205} | — | October 2, 2013 | Kitt Peak | Spacewatch | · | 1.8 km | MPC · JPL |
| 629516 | 2002 QF_{34} | — | August 29, 2002 | Palomar | NEAT | · | 2.2 km | MPC · JPL |
| 629517 | 2002 QO_{44} | — | August 18, 2002 | Palomar | NEAT | · | 2.8 km | MPC · JPL |
| 629518 | 2002 QA_{61} | — | August 28, 2002 | Palomar | NEAT | TEL | 1.3 km | MPC · JPL |
| 629519 | 2002 QV_{63} | — | August 30, 2002 | Palomar | NEAT | · | 1.3 km | MPC · JPL |
| 629520 | 2002 QF_{83} | — | August 16, 2002 | Palomar | NEAT | EOS | 2.0 km | MPC · JPL |
| 629521 | 2002 QC_{84} | — | August 27, 2002 | Palomar | NEAT | · | 2.9 km | MPC · JPL |
| 629522 | 2002 QN_{87} | — | August 13, 2002 | Palomar | NEAT | · | 720 m | MPC · JPL |
| 629523 | 2002 QV_{91} | — | August 29, 2002 | Palomar | NEAT | · | 1.6 km | MPC · JPL |
| 629524 | 2002 QC_{92} | — | May 18, 2005 | Palomar | NEAT | · | 650 m | MPC · JPL |
| 629525 | 2002 QV_{107} | — | August 27, 2002 | Palomar | NEAT | · | 1.5 km | MPC · JPL |
| 629526 | 2002 QW_{118} | — | August 18, 2002 | Palomar | NEAT | V | 500 m | MPC · JPL |
| 629527 | 2002 QV_{124} | — | February 1, 2006 | Mount Lemmon | Mount Lemmon Survey | · | 2.8 km | MPC · JPL |
| 629528 | 2002 QT_{128} | — | August 18, 2002 | Palomar | NEAT | EOS | 2.0 km | MPC · JPL |
| 629529 | 2002 QJ_{129} | — | August 17, 2002 | Palomar | NEAT | fast? | 2.5 km | MPC · JPL |
| 629530 | 2002 QK_{130} | — | August 30, 2002 | Palomar | NEAT | (5) | 1.3 km | MPC · JPL |
| 629531 | 2002 QG_{137} | — | August 28, 2002 | Palomar | NEAT | · | 2.4 km | MPC · JPL |
| 629532 | 2002 QJ_{138} | — | October 10, 2008 | Mount Lemmon | Mount Lemmon Survey | EOS | 1.9 km | MPC · JPL |
| 629533 | 2002 QV_{142} | — | October 21, 2008 | Mount Lemmon | Mount Lemmon Survey | EMA | 2.9 km | MPC · JPL |
| 629534 | 2002 QA_{144} | — | March 24, 2006 | Mount Lemmon | Mount Lemmon Survey | · | 1.8 km | MPC · JPL |
| 629535 | 2002 QF_{144} | — | August 27, 2002 | Palomar | NEAT | · | 1.3 km | MPC · JPL |
| 629536 | 2002 QN_{144} | — | August 18, 2002 | Palomar | NEAT | · | 1.6 km | MPC · JPL |
| 629537 | 2002 QR_{144} | — | January 18, 2009 | Kitt Peak | Spacewatch | · | 1.6 km | MPC · JPL |
| 629538 | 2002 QY_{146} | — | May 7, 2010 | Mount Lemmon | Mount Lemmon Survey | · | 1.4 km | MPC · JPL |
| 629539 | 2002 QG_{149} | — | November 17, 2006 | Mount Lemmon | Mount Lemmon Survey | · | 1.0 km | MPC · JPL |
| 629540 | 2002 QW_{150} | — | February 17, 2010 | Kitt Peak | Spacewatch | · | 2.6 km | MPC · JPL |
| 629541 | 2002 QD_{154} | — | February 18, 2010 | Kitt Peak | Spacewatch | EOS | 2.0 km | MPC · JPL |
| 629542 | 2002 QB_{156} | — | September 3, 2002 | Campo Imperatore | CINEOS | · | 2.6 km | MPC · JPL |
| 629543 | 2002 QF_{156} | — | October 21, 2008 | Mount Lemmon | Mount Lemmon Survey | · | 3.6 km | MPC · JPL |
| 629544 | 2002 QP_{156} | — | October 12, 1998 | Kitt Peak | Spacewatch | · | 2.1 km | MPC · JPL |
| 629545 | 2002 QX_{157} | — | August 5, 2002 | Palomar | NEAT | · | 2.0 km | MPC · JPL |
| 629546 | 2002 QP_{158} | — | September 5, 2013 | Kitt Peak | Spacewatch | · | 2.1 km | MPC · JPL |
| 629547 | 2002 QQ_{158} | — | July 25, 2015 | Haleakala | Pan-STARRS 1 | · | 3.8 km | MPC · JPL |
| 629548 | 2002 QT_{158} | — | December 18, 2003 | Kitt Peak | Spacewatch | · | 1.5 km | MPC · JPL |
| 629549 | 2002 QO_{159} | — | March 4, 2016 | Haleakala | Pan-STARRS 1 | TEL | 1.3 km | MPC · JPL |
| 629550 | 2002 RR | — | September 3, 2002 | Nashville | Clingan, R. | · | 3.4 km | MPC · JPL |
| 629551 | 2002 RQ_{77} | — | September 5, 2002 | Socorro | LINEAR | · | 3.9 km | MPC · JPL |
| 629552 | 2002 RP_{130} | — | September 10, 2002 | Haleakala | NEAT | · | 2.3 km | MPC · JPL |
| 629553 | 2002 RP_{140} | — | September 12, 2002 | Haleakala | NEAT | EUN | 1.4 km | MPC · JPL |
| 629554 | 2002 RQ_{156} | — | September 11, 2002 | Palomar | NEAT | · | 2.9 km | MPC · JPL |
| 629555 | 2002 RV_{161} | — | September 5, 2002 | Socorro | LINEAR | · | 1.8 km | MPC · JPL |
| 629556 | 2002 RA_{171} | — | September 13, 2002 | Palomar | NEAT | · | 2.1 km | MPC · JPL |
| 629557 | 2002 RT_{175} | — | September 13, 2002 | Palomar | NEAT | RAF | 970 m | MPC · JPL |
| 629558 | 2002 RV_{189} | — | September 14, 2002 | Palomar | NEAT | · | 3.2 km | MPC · JPL |
| 629559 | 2002 RD_{193} | — | September 12, 2002 | Palomar | NEAT | EOS | 2.2 km | MPC · JPL |
| 629560 | 2002 RR_{218} | — | August 30, 2002 | Palomar | NEAT | · | 1.7 km | MPC · JPL |
| 629561 | 2002 RL_{231} | — | September 7, 2002 | Socorro | LINEAR | (5) | 1.4 km | MPC · JPL |
| 629562 | 2002 RV_{238} | — | September 14, 2002 | Palomar | NEAT | · | 1.8 km | MPC · JPL |
| 629563 | 2002 RD_{246} | — | September 1, 2002 | Palomar | NEAT | · | 1.2 km | MPC · JPL |
| 629564 | 2002 RU_{259} | — | September 15, 2002 | Palomar | NEAT | · | 1.3 km | MPC · JPL |
| 629565 | 2002 RT_{263} | — | March 8, 2005 | Kitt Peak | Spacewatch | · | 2.0 km | MPC · JPL |
| 629566 | 2002 RU_{265} | — | September 11, 2002 | Haleakala | NEAT | AST | 1.6 km | MPC · JPL |
| 629567 | 2002 RF_{275} | — | September 4, 2002 | Palomar | NEAT | · | 1.1 km | MPC · JPL |
| 629568 | 2002 RQ_{281} | — | March 2, 2006 | Kitt Peak | Spacewatch | · | 1.8 km | MPC · JPL |
| 629569 | 2002 RU_{281} | — | October 26, 2008 | Kitt Peak | Spacewatch | EMA | 3.0 km | MPC · JPL |
| 629570 | 2002 RA_{282} | — | September 12, 2002 | Palomar | NEAT | · | 1.2 km | MPC · JPL |
| 629571 | 2002 RD_{284} | — | March 13, 2005 | Catalina | CSS | · | 2.5 km | MPC · JPL |
| 629572 | 2002 RA_{289} | — | April 11, 2005 | Kitt Peak | Deep Ecliptic Survey | · | 2.1 km | MPC · JPL |
| 629573 | 2002 RE_{289} | — | November 21, 2008 | Mount Lemmon | Mount Lemmon Survey | EOS | 1.9 km | MPC · JPL |
| 629574 | 2002 RP_{289} | — | September 16, 2009 | Catalina | CSS | · | 830 m | MPC · JPL |
| 629575 | 2002 RR_{290} | — | March 30, 2008 | Kitt Peak | Spacewatch | PHO | 1.4 km | MPC · JPL |
| 629576 | 2002 RX_{290} | — | September 9, 2002 | Palomar | NEAT | · | 750 m | MPC · JPL |
| 629577 | 2002 RD_{291} | — | April 29, 2006 | Kitt Peak | Spacewatch | · | 2.0 km | MPC · JPL |
| 629578 | 2002 RN_{291} | — | November 18, 2006 | Kitt Peak | Spacewatch | · | 1.1 km | MPC · JPL |
| 629579 | 2002 RT_{291} | — | September 10, 2007 | Kitt Peak | Spacewatch | · | 1.6 km | MPC · JPL |
| 629580 | 2002 RF_{292} | — | June 14, 2010 | Socorro | LINEAR | · | 1.7 km | MPC · JPL |
| 629581 | 2002 RC_{293} | — | February 27, 2006 | Kitt Peak | Spacewatch | · | 2.8 km | MPC · JPL |
| 629582 | 2002 RM_{293} | — | January 2, 2011 | Mount Lemmon | Mount Lemmon Survey | · | 820 m | MPC · JPL |
| 629583 | 2002 RG_{295} | — | November 18, 2008 | Kitt Peak | Spacewatch | · | 2.1 km | MPC · JPL |
| 629584 | 2002 RR_{295} | — | January 16, 2004 | Kitt Peak | Spacewatch | · | 2.6 km | MPC · JPL |
| 629585 | 2002 RT_{295} | — | March 11, 2005 | Kitt Peak | Spacewatch | · | 1.7 km | MPC · JPL |
| 629586 | 2002 RF_{297} | — | March 25, 2017 | Haleakala | Pan-STARRS 1 | · | 1.0 km | MPC · JPL |
| 629587 | 2002 RT_{297} | — | November 7, 2010 | Mount Lemmon | Mount Lemmon Survey | · | 3.4 km | MPC · JPL |
| 629588 | 2002 RV_{297} | — | August 21, 2015 | Haleakala | Pan-STARRS 1 | HNS | 1.0 km | MPC · JPL |
| 629589 | 2002 RJ_{298} | — | April 9, 2013 | Haleakala | Pan-STARRS 1 | · | 1.1 km | MPC · JPL |
| 629590 | 2002 RP_{299} | — | April 5, 2016 | Haleakala | Pan-STARRS 1 | · | 1.5 km | MPC · JPL |
| 629591 | 2002 SN_{49} | — | September 30, 2002 | Socorro | LINEAR | · | 630 m | MPC · JPL |
| 629592 | 2002 SB_{67} | — | February 9, 2005 | Mount Lemmon | Mount Lemmon Survey | EOS | 1.9 km | MPC · JPL |
| 629593 | 2002 TN_{93} | — | October 3, 2002 | Socorro | LINEAR | · | 3.1 km | MPC · JPL |
| 629594 | 2002 TT_{97} | — | October 2, 2002 | Campo Imperatore | CINEOS | EOS | 2.4 km | MPC · JPL |
| 629595 | 2002 TC_{101} | — | September 28, 2002 | Haleakala | NEAT | · | 940 m | MPC · JPL |
| 629596 | 2002 TE_{104} | — | October 4, 2002 | Socorro | LINEAR | · | 4.1 km | MPC · JPL |
| 629597 | 2002 TQ_{115} | — | October 3, 2002 | Palomar | NEAT | EOS | 2.5 km | MPC · JPL |
| 629598 | 2002 TU_{119} | — | October 3, 2002 | Palomar | NEAT | EOS | 2.3 km | MPC · JPL |
| 629599 | 2002 TX_{129} | — | October 4, 2002 | Palomar | NEAT | EOS | 2.6 km | MPC · JPL |
| 629600 | 2002 TC_{145} | — | October 2, 2002 | Campo Imperatore | CINEOS | · | 2.8 km | MPC · JPL |

== 629601–629700 ==
back to top

| Designation | | | Discovery | | | Properties | | Ref |
| Permanent | Provisional | Named after | Date | Site | Discoverer(s) | Category | Diam. | Ref |
|---|---|---|---|---|---|---|---|---|
| 629601 | 2002 TM_{149} | — | October 5, 2002 | Palomar | NEAT | MAR | 1.2 km | MPC · JPL |
| 629602 | 2002 TZ_{151} | — | October 5, 2002 | Palomar | NEAT | · | 1.8 km | MPC · JPL |
| 629603 | 2002 TG_{201} | — | October 5, 2002 | Kitt Peak | Spacewatch | KON | 2.1 km | MPC · JPL |
| 629604 | 2002 TF_{202} | — | October 2, 2002 | Needville | J. Dellinger | · | 2.9 km | MPC · JPL |
| 629605 | 2002 TC_{211} | — | October 7, 2002 | Socorro | LINEAR | · | 2.6 km | MPC · JPL |
| 629606 | 2002 TT_{212} | — | September 30, 2002 | Haleakala | NEAT | · | 2.7 km | MPC · JPL |
| 629607 | 2002 TF_{221} | — | September 27, 2002 | Palomar | NEAT | · | 3.3 km | MPC · JPL |
| 629608 | 2002 TM_{243} | — | October 9, 2002 | Kitt Peak | Spacewatch | · | 830 m | MPC · JPL |
| 629609 | 2002 TE_{245} | — | October 7, 2002 | Haleakala | NEAT | · | 1.6 km | MPC · JPL |
| 629610 | 2002 TY_{247} | — | October 7, 2002 | Palomar | NEAT | · | 2.6 km | MPC · JPL |
| 629611 | 2002 TA_{248} | — | October 7, 2002 | Palomar | NEAT | · | 1.8 km | MPC · JPL |
| 629612 | 2002 TG_{250} | — | October 7, 2002 | Socorro | LINEAR | · | 920 m | MPC · JPL |
| 629613 | 2002 TK_{268} | — | October 4, 2002 | Socorro | LINEAR | · | 4.4 km | MPC · JPL |
| 629614 | 2002 TS_{269} | — | September 28, 2002 | Haleakala | NEAT | · | 1.3 km | MPC · JPL |
| 629615 | 2002 TR_{379} | — | October 30, 2002 | Apache Point | SDSS | · | 1.5 km | MPC · JPL |
| 629616 | 2002 TU_{382} | — | April 5, 2005 | Mount Lemmon | Mount Lemmon Survey | · | 3.2 km | MPC · JPL |
| 629617 | 2002 TJ_{385} | — | October 15, 2002 | Palomar | NEAT | · | 2.3 km | MPC · JPL |
| 629618 | 2002 TV_{389} | — | August 15, 2009 | Kitt Peak | Spacewatch | · | 790 m | MPC · JPL |
| 629619 | 2002 TH_{390} | — | November 14, 2013 | Mount Lemmon | Mount Lemmon Survey | · | 1.7 km | MPC · JPL |
| 629620 | 2002 TG_{393} | — | April 13, 2011 | Kitt Peak | Spacewatch | · | 1.9 km | MPC · JPL |
| 629621 | 2002 TT_{393} | — | July 18, 2006 | Siding Spring | SSS | · | 1.5 km | MPC · JPL |
| 629622 | 2002 UK_{25} | — | October 5, 2002 | Socorro | LINEAR | · | 2.2 km | MPC · JPL |
| 629623 | 2002 UX_{34} | — | October 31, 2002 | Socorro | LINEAR | T_{j} (2.96) · 3:2 | 6.5 km | MPC · JPL |
| 629624 | 2002 US_{74} | — | August 29, 2006 | Anderson Mesa | LONEOS | · | 2.3 km | MPC · JPL |
| 629625 | 2002 UX_{74} | — | October 30, 2002 | Palomar | NEAT | V | 730 m | MPC · JPL |
| 629626 | 2002 UF_{76} | — | October 31, 2002 | Apache Point | SDSS | · | 2.0 km | MPC · JPL |
| 629627 | 2002 UX_{79} | — | May 5, 2008 | Mount Lemmon | Mount Lemmon Survey | · | 890 m | MPC · JPL |
| 629628 | 2002 UB_{80} | — | March 12, 2005 | Kitt Peak | Spacewatch | · | 2.7 km | MPC · JPL |
| 629629 | 2002 UZ_{80} | — | November 19, 2009 | Mount Lemmon | Mount Lemmon Survey | · | 700 m | MPC · JPL |
| 629630 | 2002 UQ_{81} | — | October 26, 2009 | Kitt Peak | Spacewatch | · | 660 m | MPC · JPL |
| 629631 | 2002 VL_{1} | — | November 2, 2002 | La Palma | A. Fitzsimmons | · | 890 m | MPC · JPL |
| 629632 | 2002 VP_{18} | — | October 15, 2002 | Palomar | NEAT | · | 2.1 km | MPC · JPL |
| 629633 | 2002 VS_{70} | — | November 7, 2002 | Socorro | LINEAR | · | 1.5 km | MPC · JPL |
| 629634 | 2002 VA_{125} | — | November 13, 2002 | Socorro | LINEAR | NYS | 1.3 km | MPC · JPL |
| 629635 | 2002 VZ_{140} | — | December 19, 2007 | Bergisch Gladbach | W. Bickel | · | 1.1 km | MPC · JPL |
| 629636 | 2002 VE_{142} | — | November 13, 2002 | Palomar | NEAT | · | 3.2 km | MPC · JPL |
| 629637 | 2002 VU_{143} | — | November 4, 2002 | Palomar | NEAT | · | 3.0 km | MPC · JPL |
| 629638 | 2002 VK_{145} | — | November 4, 2002 | Palomar | NEAT | · | 710 m | MPC · JPL |
| 629639 | 2002 VN_{145} | — | November 4, 2002 | Palomar | NEAT | · | 3.0 km | MPC · JPL |
| 629640 | 2002 VY_{147} | — | November 4, 2002 | Palomar | NEAT | · | 3.2 km | MPC · JPL |
| 629641 | 2002 VH_{150} | — | September 18, 2006 | Kitt Peak | Spacewatch | · | 1.6 km | MPC · JPL |
| 629642 | 2002 VO_{151} | — | March 13, 2008 | Kitt Peak | Spacewatch | · | 800 m | MPC · JPL |
| 629643 | 2002 VS_{152} | — | November 9, 2013 | Haleakala | Pan-STARRS 1 | · | 2.3 km | MPC · JPL |
| 629644 | 2002 VE_{153} | — | December 6, 2015 | Mount Lemmon | Mount Lemmon Survey | L5 | 10 km | MPC · JPL |
| 629645 | 2002 VG_{153} | — | April 1, 2016 | Haleakala | Pan-STARRS 1 | EOS | 1.6 km | MPC · JPL |
| 629646 | 2002 VX_{153} | — | August 17, 2012 | Haleakala | Pan-STARRS 1 | · | 1.8 km | MPC · JPL |
| 629647 | 2002 WR_{3} | — | November 24, 2002 | Palomar | NEAT | EOS | 1.9 km | MPC · JPL |
| 629648 | 2002 WU_{27} | — | November 7, 2002 | Kitt Peak | Spacewatch | · | 1.3 km | MPC · JPL |
| 629649 | 2002 WZ_{30} | — | November 24, 2002 | Palomar | NEAT | (1298) | 2.7 km | MPC · JPL |
| 629650 | 2002 WA_{32} | — | April 4, 2008 | Kitt Peak | Spacewatch | · | 890 m | MPC · JPL |
| 629651 | 2002 WG_{32} | — | December 3, 2002 | Palomar | NEAT | · | 1.5 km | MPC · JPL |
| 629652 | 2002 WJ_{32} | — | March 16, 2009 | Kitt Peak | Spacewatch | · | 2.4 km | MPC · JPL |
| 629653 | 2002 XG_{95} | — | November 23, 2002 | Palomar | NEAT | · | 3.4 km | MPC · JPL |
| 629654 | 2002 XG_{96} | — | December 5, 2002 | Socorro | LINEAR | · | 850 m | MPC · JPL |
| 629655 | 2002 XM_{97} | — | December 5, 2002 | Socorro | LINEAR | · | 860 m | MPC · JPL |
| 629656 | 2002 XB_{102} | — | December 5, 2002 | Socorro | LINEAR | · | 1.8 km | MPC · JPL |
| 629657 | 2002 XL_{118} | — | December 3, 2002 | Palomar | NEAT | VER | 3.0 km | MPC · JPL |
| 629658 | 2002 XN_{121} | — | December 10, 2002 | Palomar | NEAT | · | 3.7 km | MPC · JPL |
| 629659 | 2002 XG_{122} | — | April 19, 2013 | Haleakala | Pan-STARRS 1 | · | 1.5 km | MPC · JPL |
| 629660 | 2002 XL_{124} | — | December 12, 2002 | Palomar | NEAT | · | 3.3 km | MPC · JPL |
| 629661 | 2002 XN_{124} | — | December 22, 2008 | Mount Lemmon | Mount Lemmon Survey | · | 2.5 km | MPC · JPL |
| 629662 | 2002 YQ_{17} | — | December 31, 2002 | Socorro | LINEAR | · | 1.8 km | MPC · JPL |
| 629663 | 2003 AT_{83} | — | January 4, 2003 | Kitt Peak | Deep Lens Survey | · | 3.4 km | MPC · JPL |
| 629664 | 2003 AR_{95} | — | October 2, 2013 | Kitt Peak | Spacewatch | L5 | 8.2 km | MPC · JPL |
| 629665 | 2003 BV_{3} | — | January 24, 2003 | La Silla | A. Boattini, Hainaut, O. | · | 1.6 km | MPC · JPL |
| 629666 | 2003 BL_{5} | — | January 24, 2003 | La Silla | A. Boattini, Hainaut, O. | · | 1.7 km | MPC · JPL |
| 629667 | 2003 BJ_{85} | — | January 26, 2003 | Mount Graham | Ryan, W. | · | 2.5 km | MPC · JPL |
| 629668 | 2003 BZ_{95} | — | February 1, 2003 | Kitt Peak | Spacewatch | · | 2.7 km | MPC · JPL |
| 629669 | 2003 BB_{96} | — | December 31, 2011 | Mount Lemmon | Mount Lemmon Survey | · | 1.9 km | MPC · JPL |
| 629670 | 2003 BH_{96} | — | September 15, 2006 | Kitt Peak | Spacewatch | VER | 2.6 km | MPC · JPL |
| 629671 | 2003 BE_{98} | — | February 24, 2012 | Haleakala | Pan-STARRS 1 | · | 1.9 km | MPC · JPL |
| 629672 | 2003 BC_{99} | — | October 25, 2005 | Mount Lemmon | Mount Lemmon Survey | V | 680 m | MPC · JPL |
| 629673 | 2003 BY_{101} | — | November 9, 2007 | Kitt Peak | Spacewatch | EOS | 2.0 km | MPC · JPL |
| 629674 | 2003 BN_{102} | — | October 18, 2012 | Haleakala | Pan-STARRS 1 | · | 2.6 km | MPC · JPL |
| 629675 | 2003 CT_{22} | — | February 7, 2003 | La Silla | Barbieri, C. | · | 2.9 km | MPC · JPL |
| 629676 | 2003 CP_{26} | — | February 1, 2003 | Palomar | NEAT | · | 3.9 km | MPC · JPL |
| 629677 | 2003 CS_{26} | — | March 12, 2003 | Kitt Peak | Spacewatch | V | 730 m | MPC · JPL |
| 629678 | 2003 DW | — | February 2, 2003 | Palomar | NEAT | · | 2.5 km | MPC · JPL |
| 629679 | 2003 DR_{6} | — | February 23, 2003 | Campo Imperatore | CINEOS | · | 3.8 km | MPC · JPL |
| 629680 | 2003 DG_{25} | — | February 22, 2003 | Palomar | NEAT | · | 1.1 km | MPC · JPL |
| 629681 | 2003 EH_{18} | — | February 22, 2003 | Palomar | NEAT | · | 4.1 km | MPC · JPL |
| 629682 | 2003 EW_{23} | — | March 6, 2003 | Socorro | LINEAR | NYS | 1.2 km | MPC · JPL |
| 629683 | 2003 EC_{31} | — | March 6, 2003 | Palomar | NEAT | · | 2.7 km | MPC · JPL |
| 629684 | 2003 ET_{64} | — | January 18, 2008 | Kitt Peak | Spacewatch | VER | 2.7 km | MPC · JPL |
| 629685 | 2003 EH_{65} | — | January 1, 2008 | Kitt Peak | Spacewatch | EOS | 2.0 km | MPC · JPL |
| 629686 | 2003 FO_{110} | — | March 30, 2003 | Kitt Peak | Spacewatch | AGN | 1.1 km | MPC · JPL |
| 629687 | 2003 FQ_{125} | — | October 26, 1995 | Kitt Peak | Spacewatch | HYG | 2.2 km | MPC · JPL |
| 629688 | 2003 FX_{134} | — | March 27, 2003 | Kitt Peak | Spacewatch | · | 530 m | MPC · JPL |
| 629689 | 2003 FO_{136} | — | August 18, 2010 | ESA OGS | ESA OGS | · | 510 m | MPC · JPL |
| 629690 | 2003 FY_{138} | — | December 19, 2007 | Mount Lemmon | Mount Lemmon Survey | · | 2.7 km | MPC · JPL |
| 629691 | 2003 FL_{139} | — | October 18, 2012 | Haleakala | Pan-STARRS 1 | · | 960 m | MPC · JPL |
| 629692 | 2003 GL_{21} | — | April 7, 2003 | Kitt Peak | Spacewatch | L4 | 7.6 km | MPC · JPL |
| 629693 | 2003 GH_{32} | — | March 25, 2003 | Haleakala | NEAT | · | 910 m | MPC · JPL |
| 629694 | 2003 GE_{33} | — | November 6, 2005 | Kitt Peak | Spacewatch | · | 1.5 km | MPC · JPL |
| 629695 | 2003 GE_{57} | — | April 8, 2003 | Kitt Peak | Spacewatch | L4 | 8.1 km | MPC · JPL |
| 629696 | 2003 GF_{58} | — | April 10, 2003 | Kitt Peak | Spacewatch | · | 1.8 km | MPC · JPL |
| 629697 | 2003 GJ_{58} | — | January 3, 2011 | Mount Lemmon | Mount Lemmon Survey | · | 1.7 km | MPC · JPL |
| 629698 | 2003 GX_{59} | — | October 27, 2005 | Kitt Peak | Spacewatch | · | 2.2 km | MPC · JPL |
| 629699 | 2003 GR_{61} | — | April 9, 2003 | Kitt Peak | Spacewatch | V | 690 m | MPC · JPL |
| 629700 | 2003 GV_{61} | — | March 2, 2006 | Kitt Peak | Spacewatch | · | 590 m | MPC · JPL |

== 629701–629800 ==
back to top

| Designation | | | Discovery | | | Properties | | Ref |
| Permanent | Provisional | Named after | Date | Site | Discoverer(s) | Category | Diam. | Ref |
|---|---|---|---|---|---|---|---|---|
| 629701 | 2003 GP_{62} | — | March 2, 2012 | Mount Lemmon | Mount Lemmon Survey | DOR | 2.1 km | MPC · JPL |
| 629702 | 2003 GG_{64} | — | January 19, 2013 | Mount Lemmon | Mount Lemmon Survey | L4 | 9.1 km | MPC · JPL |
| 629703 | 2003 HO_{18} | — | April 25, 2003 | Kitt Peak | Spacewatch | NYS | 1.2 km | MPC · JPL |
| 629704 | 2003 HV_{25} | — | April 25, 2003 | Kitt Peak | Spacewatch | L4 | 7.9 km | MPC · JPL |
| 629705 | 2003 HL_{59} | — | January 1, 2009 | Mount Lemmon | Mount Lemmon Survey | · | 560 m | MPC · JPL |
| 629706 | 2003 HM_{59} | — | November 13, 2012 | Kitt Peak | Spacewatch | · | 2.9 km | MPC · JPL |
| 629707 | 2003 HW_{59} | — | April 25, 2003 | Kitt Peak | Spacewatch | MAS | 720 m | MPC · JPL |
| 629708 | 2003 HZ_{59} | — | April 13, 2008 | Mount Lemmon | Mount Lemmon Survey | · | 2.3 km | MPC · JPL |
| 629709 | 2003 HW_{60} | — | November 6, 2010 | Mount Lemmon | Mount Lemmon Survey | L4 | 10 km | MPC · JPL |
| 629710 | 2003 HW_{62} | — | October 16, 2007 | Mount Lemmon | Mount Lemmon Survey | · | 820 m | MPC · JPL |
| 629711 | 2003 HZ_{65} | — | April 25, 2003 | Kitt Peak | Spacewatch | · | 2.0 km | MPC · JPL |
| 629712 | 2003 JJ_{19} | — | May 26, 2007 | Mount Lemmon | Mount Lemmon Survey | V | 680 m | MPC · JPL |
| 629713 | 2003 JK_{19} | — | September 21, 2008 | Mount Lemmon | Mount Lemmon Survey | · | 1.4 km | MPC · JPL |
| 629714 | 2003 KV_{4} | — | May 22, 2003 | Kitt Peak | Spacewatch | · | 710 m | MPC · JPL |
| 629715 | 2003 KZ_{7} | — | May 23, 2003 | Kitt Peak | Spacewatch | · | 2.5 km | MPC · JPL |
| 629716 | 2003 KC_{38} | — | July 4, 2013 | Haleakala | Pan-STARRS 1 | · | 630 m | MPC · JPL |
| 629717 | 2003 NH_{14} | — | January 28, 2006 | Kitt Peak | Spacewatch | BRA | 1.5 km | MPC · JPL |
| 629718 | 2003 OS_{34} | — | July 24, 2003 | Palomar | NEAT | · | 1.2 km | MPC · JPL |
| 629719 | 2003 PH_{13} | — | November 5, 2010 | Mount Lemmon | Mount Lemmon Survey | · | 670 m | MPC · JPL |
| 629720 | 2003 PO_{13} | — | February 1, 1995 | Kitt Peak | Spacewatch | · | 570 m | MPC · JPL |
| 629721 | 2003 QL_{28} | — | September 26, 2000 | Kitt Peak | Spacewatch | · | 950 m | MPC · JPL |
| 629722 | 2003 QT_{43} | — | August 22, 2003 | Haleakala | NEAT | · | 850 m | MPC · JPL |
| 629723 | 2003 QJ_{90} | — | August 27, 2003 | Palomar | NEAT | · | 3.3 km | MPC · JPL |
| 629724 | 2003 QQ_{118} | — | January 26, 2006 | Kitt Peak | Spacewatch | KOR | 1.4 km | MPC · JPL |
| 629725 | 2003 SS_{1} | — | September 16, 2003 | Kitt Peak | Spacewatch | KOR | 1.4 km | MPC · JPL |
| 629726 | 2003 SA_{25} | — | August 22, 2003 | Socorro | LINEAR | MAR | 1.4 km | MPC · JPL |
| 629727 | 2003 ST_{74} | — | September 18, 2003 | Kitt Peak | Spacewatch | · | 1.4 km | MPC · JPL |
| 629728 | 2003 SX_{172} | — | September 18, 2003 | Socorro | LINEAR | · | 2.6 km | MPC · JPL |
| 629729 | 2003 SB_{186} | — | August 22, 1995 | Kitt Peak | Spacewatch | · | 1.3 km | MPC · JPL |
| 629730 | 2003 SE_{228} | — | August 22, 2003 | Campo Imperatore | CINEOS | · | 1.9 km | MPC · JPL |
| 629731 | 2003 SL_{231} | — | August 25, 2003 | Cerro Tololo | Deep Ecliptic Survey | · | 2.0 km | MPC · JPL |
| 629732 | 2003 SD_{232} | — | September 24, 2003 | Haleakala | NEAT | · | 2.7 km | MPC · JPL |
| 629733 | 2003 SH_{233} | — | September 19, 2003 | Palomar | NEAT | · | 640 m | MPC · JPL |
| 629734 | 2003 SG_{241} | — | September 27, 2003 | Kitt Peak | Spacewatch | · | 1.6 km | MPC · JPL |
| 629735 | 2003 SX_{262} | — | September 28, 2003 | Socorro | LINEAR | · | 2.4 km | MPC · JPL |
| 629736 | 2003 SM_{287} | — | September 30, 2003 | Kitt Peak | Spacewatch | · | 620 m | MPC · JPL |
| 629737 | 2003 SR_{295} | — | September 30, 2003 | Socorro | LINEAR | EOS | 2.0 km | MPC · JPL |
| 629738 | 2003 SN_{339} | — | October 16, 2003 | Palomar | NEAT | EOS | 2.4 km | MPC · JPL |
| 629739 | 2003 SY_{339} | — | September 26, 2003 | Apache Point | SDSS | · | 1.5 km | MPC · JPL |
| 629740 | 2003 SL_{357} | — | September 20, 2003 | Kitt Peak | Spacewatch | · | 1.7 km | MPC · JPL |
| 629741 | 2003 SL_{363} | — | September 22, 2003 | Kitt Peak | Spacewatch | THM | 2.1 km | MPC · JPL |
| 629742 | 2003 ST_{368} | — | September 26, 2003 | Apache Point | SDSS Collaboration | KOR | 1.1 km | MPC · JPL |
| 629743 | 2003 SA_{376} | — | September 18, 2003 | Kitt Peak | Spacewatch | · | 2.1 km | MPC · JPL |
| 629744 | 2003 SG_{376} | — | September 26, 2003 | Apache Point | SDSS Collaboration | · | 1.3 km | MPC · JPL |
| 629745 | 2003 SB_{383} | — | September 14, 1998 | Kitt Peak | Spacewatch | · | 1.9 km | MPC · JPL |
| 629746 | 2003 SA_{384} | — | September 30, 2003 | Kitt Peak | Spacewatch | KOR | 1.2 km | MPC · JPL |
| 629747 | 2003 SD_{385} | — | September 26, 2003 | Apache Point | SDSS Collaboration | KOR | 1.1 km | MPC · JPL |
| 629748 | 2003 SJ_{388} | — | October 2, 2003 | Kitt Peak | Spacewatch | · | 730 m | MPC · JPL |
| 629749 | 2003 SC_{392} | — | September 26, 2003 | Apache Point | SDSS Collaboration | · | 2.5 km | MPC · JPL |
| 629750 | 2003 SZ_{431} | — | September 17, 2003 | Kitt Peak | Spacewatch | · | 2.6 km | MPC · JPL |
| 629751 | 2003 SG_{437} | — | September 22, 2003 | Kitt Peak | Spacewatch | · | 670 m | MPC · JPL |
| 629752 | 2003 SD_{438} | — | September 15, 2013 | Haleakala | Pan-STARRS 1 | KOR | 1.3 km | MPC · JPL |
| 629753 | 2003 SQ_{442} | — | September 18, 2003 | Kitt Peak | Spacewatch | MAR | 980 m | MPC · JPL |
| 629754 | 2003 SD_{443} | — | February 16, 2013 | Mount Lemmon | Mount Lemmon Survey | · | 1.2 km | MPC · JPL |
| 629755 | 2003 SZ_{460} | — | March 11, 2011 | Mount Lemmon | Mount Lemmon Survey | EOS | 1.8 km | MPC · JPL |
| 629756 | 2003 SE_{476} | — | September 27, 2003 | Kitt Peak | Spacewatch | · | 1.4 km | MPC · JPL |
| 629757 | 2003 TA_{22} | — | October 1, 2003 | Kitt Peak | Spacewatch | · | 770 m | MPC · JPL |
| 629758 | 2003 TX_{24} | — | October 1, 2003 | Kitt Peak | Spacewatch | · | 2.5 km | MPC · JPL |
| 629759 | 2003 TC_{40} | — | September 21, 2003 | Kitt Peak | Spacewatch | · | 1.6 km | MPC · JPL |
| 629760 | 2003 TF_{42} | — | October 2, 2003 | Kitt Peak | Spacewatch | EOS | 1.7 km | MPC · JPL |
| 629761 | 2003 TM_{46} | — | October 3, 2003 | Kitt Peak | Spacewatch | · | 2.6 km | MPC · JPL |
| 629762 | 2003 TX_{47} | — | October 3, 2003 | Kitt Peak | Spacewatch | · | 2.1 km | MPC · JPL |
| 629763 | 2003 TS_{48} | — | October 3, 2003 | Kitt Peak | Spacewatch | · | 1.2 km | MPC · JPL |
| 629764 | 2003 UF_{36} | — | October 16, 2003 | Palomar | NEAT | EOS | 2.1 km | MPC · JPL |
| 629765 | 2003 UG_{40} | — | October 16, 2003 | Kitt Peak | Spacewatch | · | 3.1 km | MPC · JPL |
| 629766 | 2003 UX_{43} | — | October 18, 2003 | Kitt Peak | Spacewatch | EOS | 1.8 km | MPC · JPL |
| 629767 | 2003 US_{58} | — | October 16, 2003 | Kitt Peak | Spacewatch | · | 1.5 km | MPC · JPL |
| 629768 | 2003 UE_{91} | — | October 20, 2003 | Socorro | LINEAR | · | 740 m | MPC · JPL |
| 629769 | 2003 UR_{108} | — | October 19, 2003 | Kitt Peak | Spacewatch | · | 2.2 km | MPC · JPL |
| 629770 | 2003 UB_{126} | — | October 15, 2003 | Palomar | NEAT | NYS | 1.2 km | MPC · JPL |
| 629771 | 2003 UX_{238} | — | October 16, 2003 | Kitt Peak | Spacewatch | · | 1.8 km | MPC · JPL |
| 629772 | 2003 UG_{289} | — | October 25, 2003 | Kitt Peak | Spacewatch | · | 1.5 km | MPC · JPL |
| 629773 | 2003 UE_{318} | — | July 23, 2003 | Palomar | NEAT | · | 780 m | MPC · JPL |
| 629774 | 2003 UD_{321} | — | September 20, 2003 | Kitt Peak | Spacewatch | · | 2.2 km | MPC · JPL |
| 629775 | 2003 UG_{330} | — | October 17, 2003 | Kitt Peak | Spacewatch | · | 1.4 km | MPC · JPL |
| 629776 | 2003 US_{332} | — | November 4, 2004 | Kitt Peak | Spacewatch | · | 3.8 km | MPC · JPL |
| 629777 | 2003 UC_{333} | — | October 18, 2003 | Apache Point | SDSS Collaboration | · | 1.3 km | MPC · JPL |
| 629778 | 2003 UN_{360} | — | September 21, 2003 | Palomar | NEAT | EOS | 1.9 km | MPC · JPL |
| 629779 | 2003 UT_{363} | — | October 20, 2003 | Kitt Peak | Spacewatch | · | 650 m | MPC · JPL |
| 629780 | 2003 UN_{369} | — | October 21, 2003 | Kitt Peak | Spacewatch | · | 610 m | MPC · JPL |
| 629781 | 2003 UN_{375} | — | September 18, 2003 | Kitt Peak | Spacewatch | · | 1.9 km | MPC · JPL |
| 629782 | 2003 UC_{377} | — | October 22, 2003 | Apache Point | SDSS Collaboration | · | 1.7 km | MPC · JPL |
| 629783 | 2003 UT_{383} | — | January 13, 2005 | Catalina | CSS | · | 1.5 km | MPC · JPL |
| 629784 | 2003 UG_{405} | — | October 23, 2003 | Apache Point | SDSS Collaboration | · | 1.2 km | MPC · JPL |
| 629785 | 2003 UV_{405} | — | January 21, 1993 | Kitt Peak | Spacewatch | NYS | 1.2 km | MPC · JPL |
| 629786 | 2003 UM_{407} | — | October 23, 2003 | Apache Point | SDSS Collaboration | · | 980 m | MPC · JPL |
| 629787 | 2003 UB_{409} | — | October 23, 2003 | Apache Point | SDSS | EOS | 1.9 km | MPC · JPL |
| 629788 | 2003 UC_{412} | — | October 23, 2003 | Apache Point | SDSS Collaboration | · | 2.1 km | MPC · JPL |
| 629789 | 2003 UT_{414} | — | October 2, 2003 | Kitt Peak | Spacewatch | · | 1.0 km | MPC · JPL |
| 629790 | 2003 UL_{418} | — | October 23, 2003 | Apache Point | SDSS | · | 730 m | MPC · JPL |
| 629791 | 2003 UR_{418} | — | October 23, 2003 | Apache Point | SDSS | · | 970 m | MPC · JPL |
| 629792 | 2003 UG_{419} | — | October 16, 2003 | Palomar | NEAT | · | 1.7 km | MPC · JPL |
| 629793 | 2003 UX_{421} | — | January 14, 2011 | Mount Lemmon | Mount Lemmon Survey | · | 550 m | MPC · JPL |
| 629794 | 2003 UT_{431} | — | October 19, 2003 | Kitt Peak | Spacewatch | · | 1.2 km | MPC · JPL |
| 629795 | 2003 UY_{431} | — | April 5, 2014 | Haleakala | Pan-STARRS 1 | · | 860 m | MPC · JPL |
| 629796 | 2003 UA_{432} | — | September 17, 2006 | Kitt Peak | Spacewatch | · | 680 m | MPC · JPL |
| 629797 | 2003 UX_{437} | — | October 20, 2003 | Kitt Peak | Spacewatch | · | 650 m | MPC · JPL |
| 629798 | 2003 UJ_{442} | — | December 13, 2015 | Haleakala | Pan-STARRS 1 | EOS | 1.7 km | MPC · JPL |
| 629799 | 2003 WW_{23} | — | November 18, 2003 | Kitt Peak | Spacewatch | EOS | 1.9 km | MPC · JPL |
| 629800 | 2003 WX_{47} | — | November 18, 2003 | Kitt Peak | Spacewatch | · | 1.6 km | MPC · JPL |

== 629801–629900 ==
back to top

| Designation | | | Discovery | | | Properties | | Ref |
| Permanent | Provisional | Named after | Date | Site | Discoverer(s) | Category | Diam. | Ref |
|---|---|---|---|---|---|---|---|---|
| 629801 | 2003 WC_{76} | — | November 19, 2003 | Socorro | LINEAR | · | 740 m | MPC · JPL |
| 629802 | 2003 WH_{159} | — | November 19, 2003 | Palomar | NEAT | · | 1.6 km | MPC · JPL |
| 629803 | 2003 WE_{181} | — | November 20, 2003 | Kitt Peak | Deep Ecliptic Survey | L5 | 8.6 km | MPC · JPL |
| 629804 | 2003 WG_{188} | — | November 18, 2003 | Kitt Peak | Spacewatch | · | 670 m | MPC · JPL |
| 629805 | 2003 WZ_{195} | — | November 26, 2003 | Kitt Peak | Spacewatch | · | 840 m | MPC · JPL |
| 629806 | 2003 WD_{196} | — | January 16, 2008 | Kitt Peak | Spacewatch | · | 690 m | MPC · JPL |
| 629807 | 2003 WF_{197} | — | March 17, 2012 | Kitt Peak | Spacewatch | (1338) (FLO) | 580 m | MPC · JPL |
| 629808 | 2003 WH_{198} | — | September 25, 2011 | Haleakala | Pan-STARRS 1 | · | 1.3 km | MPC · JPL |
| 629809 | 2003 WO_{199} | — | November 20, 2003 | Kitt Peak | Spacewatch | · | 1.2 km | MPC · JPL |
| 629810 | 2003 WD_{207} | — | November 30, 2003 | Kitt Peak | Spacewatch | · | 1.7 km | MPC · JPL |
| 629811 | 2003 WU_{208} | — | October 30, 2008 | Mount Lemmon | Mount Lemmon Survey | · | 1.6 km | MPC · JPL |
| 629812 | 2003 WR_{210} | — | October 20, 2011 | Mount Lemmon | Mount Lemmon Survey | · | 800 m | MPC · JPL |
| 629813 | 2003 XP_{28} | — | December 1, 2003 | Kitt Peak | Spacewatch | · | 1.9 km | MPC · JPL |
| 629814 | 2003 XY_{29} | — | December 1, 2003 | Kitt Peak | Spacewatch | · | 620 m | MPC · JPL |
| 629815 | 2003 YC_{14} | — | December 17, 2003 | Socorro | LINEAR | · | 2.2 km | MPC · JPL |
| 629816 | 2003 YM_{109} | — | December 22, 2003 | Kitt Peak | Spacewatch | · | 1.4 km | MPC · JPL |
| 629817 | 2003 YR_{139} | — | December 28, 2003 | Socorro | LINEAR | · | 1.6 km | MPC · JPL |
| 629818 | 2003 YH_{142} | — | December 28, 2003 | Socorro | LINEAR | · | 1.1 km | MPC · JPL |
| 629819 | 2003 YB_{172} | — | December 18, 2003 | Kitt Peak | Spacewatch | · | 960 m | MPC · JPL |
| 629820 | 2003 YV_{176} | — | December 16, 2003 | Mauna Kea | D. D. Balam | · | 1.6 km | MPC · JPL |
| 629821 | 2003 YA_{183} | — | February 19, 2004 | Nogales | P. R. Holvorcem, M. Schwartz | EOS | 1.9 km | MPC · JPL |
| 629822 | 2003 YV_{183} | — | March 7, 2013 | Siding Spring | SSS | · | 1.3 km | MPC · JPL |
| 629823 | 2003 YW_{183} | — | March 1, 2012 | Mount Lemmon | Mount Lemmon Survey | · | 860 m | MPC · JPL |
| 629824 | 2003 YY_{183} | — | January 18, 2015 | Haleakala | Pan-STARRS 1 | · | 2.7 km | MPC · JPL |
| 629825 | 2003 YL_{185} | — | August 27, 2006 | Kitt Peak | Spacewatch | EUN | 1.1 km | MPC · JPL |
| 629826 | 2003 YT_{186} | — | December 29, 2003 | Kitt Peak | Spacewatch | EOS | 2.2 km | MPC · JPL |
| 629827 | 2003 YN_{187} | — | January 21, 1993 | Kitt Peak | Spacewatch | V | 570 m | MPC · JPL |
| 629828 | 2004 AP_{6} | — | January 15, 2004 | Kitt Peak | Spacewatch | EOS | 1.7 km | MPC · JPL |
| 629829 | 2004 AK_{16} | — | January 15, 2004 | Kitt Peak | Spacewatch | · | 1.3 km | MPC · JPL |
| 629830 | 2004 AK_{20} | — | December 21, 2003 | Kitt Peak | Spacewatch | V | 600 m | MPC · JPL |
| 629831 | 2004 AM_{21} | — | January 15, 2004 | Kitt Peak | Spacewatch | EOS | 2.2 km | MPC · JPL |
| 629832 | 2004 AG_{23} | — | January 15, 2004 | Kitt Peak | Spacewatch | · | 630 m | MPC · JPL |
| 629833 | 2004 AL_{26} | — | January 13, 2004 | Palomar | NEAT | · | 1.6 km | MPC · JPL |
| 629834 | 2004 BP_{10} | — | January 17, 2004 | Haleakala | NEAT | · | 1.2 km | MPC · JPL |
| 629835 | 2004 BK_{13} | — | January 17, 2004 | Palomar | NEAT | · | 1.8 km | MPC · JPL |
| 629836 | 2004 BW_{30} | — | January 18, 2004 | Palomar | NEAT | · | 1.7 km | MPC · JPL |
| 629837 | 2004 BV_{31} | — | December 21, 2003 | Kitt Peak | Spacewatch | (5) | 1.4 km | MPC · JPL |
| 629838 | 2004 BJ_{53} | — | January 15, 2004 | Kitt Peak | Spacewatch | · | 2.1 km | MPC · JPL |
| 629839 | 2004 BM_{86} | — | January 16, 2004 | Kitt Peak | Spacewatch | AGN | 1.1 km | MPC · JPL |
| 629840 | 2004 BX_{97} | — | January 27, 2004 | Kitt Peak | Spacewatch | · | 680 m | MPC · JPL |
| 629841 | 2004 BH_{104} | — | January 23, 2004 | Socorro | LINEAR | · | 1.5 km | MPC · JPL |
| 629842 | 2004 BF_{126} | — | January 16, 2004 | Kitt Peak | Spacewatch | · | 910 m | MPC · JPL |
| 629843 | 2004 BS_{131} | — | January 16, 2004 | Kitt Peak | Spacewatch | EUN | 1.3 km | MPC · JPL |
| 629844 | 2004 BE_{133} | — | August 31, 2002 | Kitt Peak | Spacewatch | · | 1.1 km | MPC · JPL |
| 629845 | 2004 BF_{133} | — | January 17, 2004 | Kitt Peak | Spacewatch | (5) | 1.1 km | MPC · JPL |
| 629846 | 2004 BN_{139} | — | January 19, 2004 | Kitt Peak | Spacewatch | · | 2.5 km | MPC · JPL |
| 629847 | 2004 BH_{142} | — | January 19, 2004 | Kitt Peak | Spacewatch | EOS | 1.7 km | MPC · JPL |
| 629848 | 2004 BB_{156} | — | January 28, 2004 | Kitt Peak | Spacewatch | · | 2.1 km | MPC · JPL |
| 629849 | 2004 BF_{164} | — | July 4, 2005 | Mount Lemmon | Mount Lemmon Survey | NYS | 750 m | MPC · JPL |
| 629850 | 2004 BM_{164} | — | January 17, 2004 | Kitt Peak | Spacewatch | EOS | 1.8 km | MPC · JPL |
| 629851 | 2004 BT_{164} | — | October 20, 2007 | Mount Lemmon | Mount Lemmon Survey | · | 2.0 km | MPC · JPL |
| 629852 | 2004 BU_{164} | — | December 30, 2007 | Kitt Peak | Spacewatch | · | 1.2 km | MPC · JPL |
| 629853 | 2004 BD_{165} | — | December 3, 2007 | Kitt Peak | Spacewatch | · | 1.8 km | MPC · JPL |
| 629854 | 2004 BK_{169} | — | November 26, 2013 | Mount Lemmon | Mount Lemmon Survey | · | 2.4 km | MPC · JPL |
| 629855 | 2004 BG_{170} | — | September 2, 2014 | Haleakala | Pan-STARRS 1 | · | 1.0 km | MPC · JPL |
| 629856 | 2004 BA_{172} | — | September 14, 2007 | Kitt Peak | Spacewatch | · | 2.6 km | MPC · JPL |
| 629857 | 2004 CN_{26} | — | February 11, 2004 | Kitt Peak | Spacewatch | · | 590 m | MPC · JPL |
| 629858 | 2004 CD_{38} | — | February 13, 2004 | Palomar | NEAT | (194) | 2.3 km | MPC · JPL |
| 629859 | 2004 CU_{69} | — | January 23, 2004 | Anderson Mesa | LONEOS | · | 1.5 km | MPC · JPL |
| 629860 | 2004 CR_{87} | — | February 11, 2004 | Kitt Peak | Spacewatch | · | 3.1 km | MPC · JPL |
| 629861 | 2004 CY_{108} | — | February 15, 2004 | Palomar | NEAT | JUN | 1.2 km | MPC · JPL |
| 629862 | 2004 CZ_{122} | — | August 20, 2001 | Cerro Tololo | Deep Ecliptic Survey | · | 3.0 km | MPC · JPL |
| 629863 | 2004 CF_{126} | — | February 12, 2004 | Kitt Peak | Spacewatch | · | 1.4 km | MPC · JPL |
| 629864 | 2004 CB_{128} | — | February 13, 2004 | Kitt Peak | Spacewatch | · | 770 m | MPC · JPL |
| 629865 | 2004 CD_{131} | — | January 1, 2009 | Kitt Peak | Spacewatch | EOS | 1.9 km | MPC · JPL |
| 629866 | 2004 CK_{131} | — | February 10, 2011 | Mount Lemmon | Mount Lemmon Survey | · | 710 m | MPC · JPL |
| 629867 | 2004 CZ_{131} | — | September 2, 2010 | Mount Lemmon | Mount Lemmon Survey | · | 1.4 km | MPC · JPL |
| 629868 | 2004 CO_{132} | — | December 7, 2015 | Haleakala | Pan-STARRS 1 | (5) | 920 m | MPC · JPL |
| 629869 | 2004 CT_{133} | — | December 17, 2007 | Mount Lemmon | Mount Lemmon Survey | · | 1.3 km | MPC · JPL |
| 629870 | 2004 CV_{133} | — | February 20, 2015 | Mount Lemmon | Mount Lemmon Survey | · | 2.4 km | MPC · JPL |
| 629871 | 2004 CY_{133} | — | January 22, 2015 | Haleakala | Pan-STARRS 1 | · | 2.8 km | MPC · JPL |
| 629872 | 2004 CE_{134} | — | October 26, 2013 | Catalina | CSS | · | 2.9 km | MPC · JPL |
| 629873 | 2004 DW_{1} | — | February 17, 2004 | Socorro | LINEAR | · | 3.1 km | MPC · JPL |
| 629874 | 2004 DM_{34} | — | January 16, 2004 | Nogales | P. R. Holvorcem, M. Schwartz | · | 4.8 km | MPC · JPL |
| 629875 | 2004 DM_{36} | — | February 12, 2004 | Palomar | NEAT | · | 1.3 km | MPC · JPL |
| 629876 | 2004 DD_{54} | — | February 22, 2004 | Kitt Peak | Spacewatch | · | 930 m | MPC · JPL |
| 629877 | 2004 DL_{55} | — | February 22, 2004 | Kitt Peak | Spacewatch | · | 1.1 km | MPC · JPL |
| 629878 | 2004 DT_{67} | — | February 26, 2004 | Kitt Peak | Deep Ecliptic Survey | · | 1.2 km | MPC · JPL |
| 629879 | 2004 DB_{68} | — | February 26, 2004 | Kitt Peak | Deep Ecliptic Survey | · | 850 m | MPC · JPL |
| 629880 | 2004 DQ_{80} | — | September 14, 2007 | Catalina | CSS | · | 3.1 km | MPC · JPL |
| 629881 | 2004 DR_{80} | — | September 29, 2009 | Mount Lemmon | Mount Lemmon Survey | · | 920 m | MPC · JPL |
| 629882 | 2004 DY_{80} | — | February 29, 2004 | Kitt Peak | Spacewatch | · | 970 m | MPC · JPL |
| 629883 | 2004 DJ_{81} | — | December 29, 2014 | Haleakala | Pan-STARRS 1 | · | 2.7 km | MPC · JPL |
| 629884 | 2004 DS_{81} | — | August 21, 2006 | Kitt Peak | Spacewatch | · | 2.1 km | MPC · JPL |
| 629885 | 2004 DV_{81} | — | January 22, 2015 | Haleakala | Pan-STARRS 1 | EOS | 1.8 km | MPC · JPL |
| 629886 | 2004 DU_{82} | — | June 4, 2011 | Mount Lemmon | Mount Lemmon Survey | · | 2.7 km | MPC · JPL |
| 629887 | 2004 DB_{83} | — | December 19, 2007 | Mount Lemmon | Mount Lemmon Survey | · | 1.4 km | MPC · JPL |
| 629888 | 2004 DZ_{84} | — | December 4, 2008 | Kitt Peak | Spacewatch | HYG | 2.3 km | MPC · JPL |
| 629889 | 2004 DO_{88} | — | August 20, 2014 | Haleakala | Pan-STARRS 1 | · | 1.0 km | MPC · JPL |
| 629890 | 2004 EB_{8} | — | March 13, 2004 | Palomar | NEAT | · | 1.4 km | MPC · JPL |
| 629891 | 2004 ER_{20} | — | July 30, 2001 | Palomar | NEAT | · | 1.4 km | MPC · JPL |
| 629892 | 2004 EN_{26} | — | March 14, 2004 | Kitt Peak | Spacewatch | · | 1.2 km | MPC · JPL |
| 629893 | 2004 EG_{28} | — | March 15, 2004 | Kitt Peak | Spacewatch | · | 1.5 km | MPC · JPL |
| 629894 | 2004 ES_{49} | — | March 15, 2004 | Kitt Peak | Spacewatch | · | 1.8 km | MPC · JPL |
| 629895 | 2004 EN_{61} | — | January 30, 2004 | Kitt Peak | Spacewatch | · | 1.8 km | MPC · JPL |
| 629896 | 2004 ED_{92} | — | January 27, 2004 | Kitt Peak | Spacewatch | · | 980 m | MPC · JPL |
| 629897 | 2004 EN_{92} | — | March 15, 2004 | Kitt Peak | Spacewatch | NYS | 840 m | MPC · JPL |
| 629898 | 2004 ET_{98} | — | March 15, 2004 | Kitt Peak | Spacewatch | · | 1.0 km | MPC · JPL |
| 629899 | 2004 EV_{107} | — | March 15, 2004 | Kitt Peak | Spacewatch | THM | 2.0 km | MPC · JPL |
| 629900 | 2004 ET_{109} | — | March 15, 2004 | Kitt Peak | Spacewatch | · | 810 m | MPC · JPL |

== 629901–630000 ==
back to top

| Designation | | | Discovery | | | Properties | | Ref |
| Permanent | Provisional | Named after | Date | Site | Discoverer(s) | Category | Diam. | Ref |
|---|---|---|---|---|---|---|---|---|
| 629901 | 2004 EL_{116} | — | March 14, 2004 | Kitt Peak | Spacewatch | · | 2.8 km | MPC · JPL |
| 629902 | 2004 EE_{117} | — | March 15, 2004 | Kitt Peak | Spacewatch | · | 1.0 km | MPC · JPL |
| 629903 | 2004 FR_{15} | — | May 24, 2000 | Kitt Peak | Spacewatch | · | 1.5 km | MPC · JPL |
| 629904 | 2004 FP_{40} | — | March 18, 2004 | Socorro | LINEAR | · | 1.0 km | MPC · JPL |
| 629905 | 2004 FL_{60} | — | February 17, 2004 | Kitt Peak | Spacewatch | EOS | 1.9 km | MPC · JPL |
| 629906 | 2004 FH_{70} | — | March 16, 2004 | Valmeca | C. Demeautis, Matter, D. | ADE | 1.7 km | MPC · JPL |
| 629907 | 2004 FG_{76} | — | March 18, 2004 | Kitt Peak | Spacewatch | · | 2.7 km | MPC · JPL |
| 629908 | 2004 FD_{79} | — | September 28, 1992 | Kitt Peak | Spacewatch | · | 1.9 km | MPC · JPL |
| 629909 | 2004 FW_{79} | — | March 20, 2004 | Socorro | LINEAR | · | 1.1 km | MPC · JPL |
| 629910 | 2004 FD_{87} | — | March 11, 2004 | Palomar | NEAT | · | 3.0 km | MPC · JPL |
| 629911 | 2004 FY_{122} | — | March 17, 2004 | Kitt Peak | Spacewatch | VER | 2.5 km | MPC · JPL |
| 629912 | 2004 FM_{147} | — | March 16, 2004 | Palomar | NEAT | (194) | 2.1 km | MPC · JPL |
| 629913 | 2004 FG_{149} | — | March 16, 2004 | Kitt Peak | Spacewatch | · | 2.3 km | MPC · JPL |
| 629914 | 2004 FG_{153} | — | March 17, 2004 | Junk Bond | D. Healy | · | 1.6 km | MPC · JPL |
| 629915 | 2004 FJ_{158} | — | March 17, 2004 | Kitt Peak | Spacewatch | MIS | 2.3 km | MPC · JPL |
| 629916 | 2004 FH_{167} | — | May 6, 2008 | Mount Lemmon | Mount Lemmon Survey | · | 830 m | MPC · JPL |
| 629917 | 2004 FJ_{167} | — | April 15, 2008 | Kitt Peak | Spacewatch | MAS | 630 m | MPC · JPL |
| 629918 | 2004 FL_{167} | — | November 27, 2006 | Kitt Peak | Spacewatch | · | 830 m | MPC · JPL |
| 629919 | 2004 FN_{167} | — | March 29, 2004 | Kitt Peak | Spacewatch | MAS | 710 m | MPC · JPL |
| 629920 | 2004 FX_{167} | — | February 21, 2009 | Kitt Peak | Spacewatch | EOS | 1.5 km | MPC · JPL |
| 629921 | 2004 FW_{168} | — | October 13, 2006 | Kitt Peak | Spacewatch | · | 1.3 km | MPC · JPL |
| 629922 | 2004 FY_{169} | — | February 17, 2004 | La Silla | Barbieri, C. | · | 1.0 km | MPC · JPL |
| 629923 | 2004 FN_{172} | — | September 15, 2006 | Kitt Peak | Spacewatch | · | 2.2 km | MPC · JPL |
| 629924 | 2004 FY_{172} | — | September 12, 2007 | Mount Lemmon | Mount Lemmon Survey | · | 2.8 km | MPC · JPL |
| 629925 | 2004 FZ_{172} | — | September 15, 2012 | Catalina | CSS | · | 2.5 km | MPC · JPL |
| 629926 | 2004 FU_{173} | — | August 29, 2006 | Kitt Peak | Spacewatch | · | 3.2 km | MPC · JPL |
| 629927 | 2004 FF_{177} | — | February 17, 2010 | Kitt Peak | Spacewatch | VER | 2.5 km | MPC · JPL |
| 629928 | 2004 GZ_{2} | — | April 27, 2000 | Anderson Mesa | LONEOS | · | 2.0 km | MPC · JPL |
| 629929 | 2004 GP_{6} | — | April 12, 2004 | Kitt Peak | Spacewatch | · | 1.5 km | MPC · JPL |
| 629930 | 2004 GU_{49} | — | April 12, 2004 | Kitt Peak | Spacewatch | · | 1.9 km | MPC · JPL |
| 629931 | 2004 GZ_{61} | — | April 13, 2004 | Kitt Peak | Spacewatch | · | 1.3 km | MPC · JPL |
| 629932 | 2004 GF_{62} | — | March 23, 2004 | Kitt Peak | Spacewatch | THM | 2.0 km | MPC · JPL |
| 629933 | 2004 GL_{62} | — | April 13, 2004 | Kitt Peak | Spacewatch | · | 540 m | MPC · JPL |
| 629934 | 2004 GS_{66} | — | August 24, 2001 | Kitt Peak | Spacewatch | · | 1.4 km | MPC · JPL |
| 629935 | 2004 GG_{69} | — | April 13, 2004 | Kitt Peak | Spacewatch | V | 630 m | MPC · JPL |
| 629936 | 2004 GS_{79} | — | March 26, 2004 | Kitt Peak | Spacewatch | · | 1.1 km | MPC · JPL |
| 629937 | 2004 GO_{89} | — | March 16, 2004 | Kitt Peak | Spacewatch | · | 1.7 km | MPC · JPL |
| 629938 | 2004 GW_{90} | — | March 8, 2008 | Mount Lemmon | Mount Lemmon Survey | (17392) | 1.3 km | MPC · JPL |
| 629939 | 2004 GO_{91} | — | October 1, 2005 | Kitt Peak | Spacewatch | · | 880 m | MPC · JPL |
| 629940 | 2004 GW_{91} | — | July 30, 2005 | Siding Spring | SSS | · | 4.1 km | MPC · JPL |
| 629941 | 2004 HN_{15} | — | April 16, 2004 | Kitt Peak | Spacewatch | · | 1.4 km | MPC · JPL |
| 629942 | 2004 HE_{21} | — | February 25, 2011 | Mount Lemmon | Mount Lemmon Survey | · | 1.3 km | MPC · JPL |
| 629943 | 2004 HX_{21} | — | April 16, 2004 | Kitt Peak | Spacewatch | · | 2.0 km | MPC · JPL |
| 629944 | 2004 HM_{26} | — | April 12, 2004 | Palomar | NEAT | · | 1.9 km | MPC · JPL |
| 629945 | 2004 HZ_{52} | — | March 19, 2004 | Palomar | NEAT | JUN | 1.2 km | MPC · JPL |
| 629946 | 2004 HN_{57} | — | April 21, 2004 | Kitt Peak | Spacewatch | · | 1.0 km | MPC · JPL |
| 629947 | 2004 HH_{73} | — | April 28, 2004 | Kitt Peak | Spacewatch | · | 1.5 km | MPC · JPL |
| 629948 | 2004 HD_{74} | — | April 28, 2004 | Kitt Peak | Spacewatch | · | 1.1 km | MPC · JPL |
| 629949 | 2004 HB_{80} | — | February 28, 2008 | Kitt Peak | Spacewatch | · | 1.5 km | MPC · JPL |
| 629950 | 2004 HG_{80} | — | October 27, 1995 | Kitt Peak | Spacewatch | · | 2.9 km | MPC · JPL |
| 629951 | 2004 HH_{80} | — | January 31, 2009 | Mount Lemmon | Mount Lemmon Survey | · | 2.7 km | MPC · JPL |
| 629952 | 2004 HR_{80} | — | November 7, 2015 | Mount Lemmon | Mount Lemmon Survey | · | 1.4 km | MPC · JPL |
| 629953 | 2004 HU_{80} | — | March 22, 2015 | Haleakala | Pan-STARRS 1 | MAS | 690 m | MPC · JPL |
| 629954 | 2004 HZ_{80} | — | April 23, 2015 | Haleakala | Pan-STARRS 2 | · | 1.0 km | MPC · JPL |
| 629955 | 2004 HF_{85} | — | April 30, 2004 | Kitt Peak | Spacewatch | · | 2.8 km | MPC · JPL |
| 629956 | 2004 JT_{13} | — | April 22, 2004 | Kitt Peak | Spacewatch | ADE | 2.1 km | MPC · JPL |
| 629957 | 2004 JL_{24} | — | May 15, 2004 | Socorro | LINEAR | · | 4.3 km | MPC · JPL |
| 629958 | 2004 JO_{38} | — | May 14, 2004 | Kitt Peak | Spacewatch | MAR | 1.2 km | MPC · JPL |
| 629959 | 2004 JL_{46} | — | May 13, 2004 | Kitt Peak | Spacewatch | · | 980 m | MPC · JPL |
| 629960 | 2004 JU_{47} | — | May 13, 2004 | Kitt Peak | Spacewatch | · | 1.7 km | MPC · JPL |
| 629961 | 2004 JT_{56} | — | May 14, 2004 | Kitt Peak | Spacewatch | HNS | 1.4 km | MPC · JPL |
| 629962 | 2004 JW_{56} | — | November 18, 2009 | Mount Lemmon | Mount Lemmon Survey | NYS | 1.1 km | MPC · JPL |
| 629963 | 2004 JK_{57} | — | May 21, 2015 | Haleakala | Pan-STARRS 1 | · | 860 m | MPC · JPL |
| 629964 | 2004 JL_{57} | — | January 1, 2008 | Kitt Peak | Spacewatch | · | 3.1 km | MPC · JPL |
| 629965 | 2004 JJ_{58} | — | March 3, 2009 | Kitt Peak | Spacewatch | VER | 2.2 km | MPC · JPL |
| 629966 | 2004 JL_{58} | — | October 7, 2012 | Haleakala | Pan-STARRS 1 | · | 3.3 km | MPC · JPL |
| 629967 | 2004 JQ_{58} | — | May 9, 2004 | Kitt Peak | Spacewatch | THM | 2.2 km | MPC · JPL |
| 629968 | 2004 KM_{8} | — | May 18, 2004 | Socorro | LINEAR | · | 1.4 km | MPC · JPL |
| 629969 | 2004 KN_{11} | — | May 20, 2004 | Kitt Peak | Spacewatch | · | 2.2 km | MPC · JPL |
| 629970 | 2004 KT_{19} | — | May 20, 2015 | Mount Lemmon | Mount Lemmon Survey | · | 2.9 km | MPC · JPL |
| 629971 | 2004 KC_{21} | — | May 23, 2004 | Kitt Peak | Spacewatch | EUN | 1.2 km | MPC · JPL |
| 629972 | 2004 LJ_{10} | — | June 8, 2004 | Kitt Peak | Spacewatch | · | 970 m | MPC · JPL |
| 629973 | 2004 LP_{12} | — | October 23, 1997 | Kitt Peak | Spacewatch | EUN | 1.4 km | MPC · JPL |
| 629974 | 2004 LQ_{18} | — | May 19, 2004 | Kitt Peak | Spacewatch | · | 2.0 km | MPC · JPL |
| 629975 | 2004 LW_{20} | — | June 12, 2004 | Kitt Peak | Spacewatch | EUN | 1.5 km | MPC · JPL |
| 629976 | 2004 LK_{22} | — | June 14, 2004 | Socorro | LINEAR | · | 2.6 km | MPC · JPL |
| 629977 | 2004 MN_{9} | — | November 23, 2016 | Mount Lemmon | Mount Lemmon Survey | PHO | 960 m | MPC · JPL |
| 629978 | 2004 MZ_{9} | — | June 16, 2004 | Kitt Peak | Spacewatch | · | 1.4 km | MPC · JPL |
| 629979 | 2004 MD_{10} | — | June 22, 2004 | Kitt Peak | Spacewatch | · | 2.6 km | MPC · JPL |
| 629980 | 2004 OE_{7} | — | July 16, 2004 | Socorro | LINEAR | · | 1.4 km | MPC · JPL |
| 629981 | 2004 ON_{16} | — | January 30, 2006 | Catalina | CSS | GEF | 1.2 km | MPC · JPL |
| 629982 | 2004 PA_{24} | — | August 8, 2004 | Socorro | LINEAR | DOR | 2.8 km | MPC · JPL |
| 629983 | 2004 PH_{32} | — | August 8, 2004 | Socorro | LINEAR | · | 1.9 km | MPC · JPL |
| 629984 | 2004 PK_{49} | — | August 8, 2004 | Socorro | LINEAR | · | 1.5 km | MPC · JPL |
| 629985 | 2004 PD_{117} | — | August 12, 2004 | Mauna Kea | P. A. Wiegert | · | 1.2 km | MPC · JPL |
| 629986 | 2004 PZ_{120} | — | November 3, 2005 | Kitt Peak | Spacewatch | · | 1.3 km | MPC · JPL |
| 629987 | 2004 QF_{6} | — | August 20, 2004 | Kitt Peak | Spacewatch | · | 3.3 km | MPC · JPL |
| 629988 | 2004 QF_{16} | — | August 21, 2004 | Mauna Kea | D. D. Balam | · | 2.5 km | MPC · JPL |
| 629989 | 2004 QU_{20} | — | January 29, 1996 | Kitt Peak | Spacewatch | · | 1.4 km | MPC · JPL |
| 629990 | 2004 QA_{33} | — | December 16, 2006 | Mount Lemmon | Mount Lemmon Survey | EOS | 2.4 km | MPC · JPL |
| 629991 | 2004 QT_{33} | — | September 28, 2009 | Kitt Peak | Spacewatch | · | 1.5 km | MPC · JPL |
| 629992 | 2004 RC_{4} | — | August 8, 2004 | Palomar | NEAT | · | 1.1 km | MPC · JPL |
| 629993 | 2004 RM_{4} | — | September 4, 2004 | Palomar | NEAT | · | 850 m | MPC · JPL |
| 629994 | 2004 RN_{4} | — | September 4, 2004 | Palomar | NEAT | · | 1.9 km | MPC · JPL |
| 629995 | 2004 RJ_{5} | — | September 4, 2004 | Palomar | NEAT | ADE | 2.0 km | MPC · JPL |
| 629996 | 2004 RD_{6} | — | August 21, 2004 | Siding Spring | SSS | V | 770 m | MPC · JPL |
| 629997 | 2004 RR_{43} | — | August 27, 1995 | Kitt Peak | Spacewatch | · | 1.8 km | MPC · JPL |
| 629998 | 2004 RX_{82} | — | September 9, 2004 | Socorro | LINEAR | · | 970 m | MPC · JPL |
| 629999 | 2004 RG_{117} | — | September 7, 2004 | Kitt Peak | Spacewatch | KOR | 1.5 km | MPC · JPL |
| 630000 | 2004 RN_{118} | — | March 20, 2002 | Kitt Peak | Deep Ecliptic Survey | · | 1.8 km | MPC · JPL |

back to top

== Meaning of names ==
As minor planet discoveries are confirmed, they are given a permanent number by the IAU's Minor Planet Center (MPC), and the discoverers can then submit names for them, following the IAU's naming conventions. The list below concerns those minor planets in the specified number-range that have received names, and explains the meanings of those names.

Official naming citations of newly named small Solar System bodies are approved and published in a bulletin by IAU's Working Group for Small Bodies Nomenclature (WGSBN). Before May 2021, citations were published in MPC's Minor Planet Circulars for many decades. Recent citations can also be found on the JPL Small-Body Database (SBDB). Until his death in 2016, German astronomer Lutz D. Schmadel compiled these citations into the Dictionary of Minor Planet Names (DMP) and regularly updated the collection.

Based on Paul Herget's The Names of the Minor Planets, Schmadel also researched the unclear origin of numerous asteroids, most of which had been named prior to World War II. This article incorporates text from this source, which is in the public domain: SBDB New namings may only be added to this list below after official publication as the preannouncement of names is condemned. The WGSBN publishes a comprehensive guideline for the naming rules of non-cometary small Solar System bodies.

| Named minor planet | Provisional | This minor planet was named for... | Ref · Catalog |
|---|---|---|---|
| 629141 Mihalikenikő | 1999 YN_{17} | Enikő Mihalik, Hungarian top models. | IAU · 629141 |
