= List of minor planets: 690001–691000 =

The following is a partial list of minor planets, running from minor-planet number 690001 through 691000, inclusive. The primary data for this and other partial lists is based on JPL's "Small-Body Orbital Elements" and data available from the Minor Planet Center. Critical list information is also provided by the MPC, unless otherwise specified from Lowell Observatory. A detailed description of the table's columns and additional sources are given on the main page including a complete list of every page in this series, and a statistical break-up on the dynamical classification of minor planets.

Also see the summary list of all named bodies in numerical and alphabetical order, and the corresponding naming citations for the number range of this particular list. New namings may only be added to this list after official publication, as the preannouncement of names is condemned by the Working Group for Small Bodies Nomenclature of the International Astronomical Union.

Near-Earth obj.	MBA (inner)	MBA (outer)	Centaur
Mars-crosser	MBA (middle)	Jupiter trojan	Trans-Neptunian obj.
Unclassified

== 690001–690100 ==
Designation			Discovery			Properties		Ref
Permanent	Provisional	Named after	Date	Site	Discoverer(s)	Category	Diam.	Ref
690001	2013 VQ_{21}	—	October 13, 2013	Nogales	M. Schwartz, P. R. Holvorcem	·	1.6 km	MPC; JPL
690002	2013 VA_{22}	—	November 3, 2013	Palomar	Palomar Transient Factory	HNS	1.3 km	MPC; JPL
690003	2013 VF_{25}	—	November 12, 2013	Kitt Peak	Spacewatch	·	1.7 km	MPC; JPL
690004	2013 VR_{27}	—	November 2, 2013	Kitt Peak	Spacewatch	·	1.3 km	MPC; JPL
690005	2013 VE_{31}	—	November 7, 2013	Kitt Peak	Spacewatch	RAF	820 m	MPC; JPL
690006	2013 VY_{32}	—	November 9, 2013	Haleakala	Pan-STARRS 1	·	1.5 km	MPC; JPL
690007	2013 VA_{33}	—	January 21, 2015	Haleakala	Pan-STARRS 1	·	1.1 km	MPC; JPL
690008	2013 VC_{33}	—	January 20, 2015	Haleakala	Pan-STARRS 1	·	880 m	MPC; JPL
690009	2013 VN_{33}	—	November 2, 2013	Mount Lemmon	Mount Lemmon Survey	EUN	840 m	MPC; JPL
690010	2013 VR_{33}	—	August 24, 2017	Haleakala	Pan-STARRS 1	·	1.1 km	MPC; JPL
690011	2013 VG_{34}	—	March 11, 2015	Kitt Peak	Spacewatch	·	1.2 km	MPC; JPL
690012	2013 VW_{35}	—	November 12, 2013	Mount Lemmon	Mount Lemmon Survey	·	1.1 km	MPC; JPL
690013	2013 VY_{41}	—	November 2, 2013	Kitt Peak	Spacewatch	·	1.4 km	MPC; JPL
690014	2013 VZ_{41}	—	September 11, 2007	XuYi	PMO NEO Survey Program	LIX	3.2 km	MPC; JPL
690015	2013 VP_{42}	—	February 18, 2015	Haleakala	Pan-STARRS 1	·	1.2 km	MPC; JPL
690016	2013 VW_{46}	—	November 1, 2013	Kitt Peak	Spacewatch	·	1.1 km	MPC; JPL
690017	2013 VC_{49}	—	November 8, 2013	Kitt Peak	Spacewatch	(5)	810 m	MPC; JPL
690018	2013 VG_{52}	—	November 9, 2013	Kitt Peak	Spacewatch	·	1.2 km	MPC; JPL
690019	2013 VO_{53}	—	November 8, 2013	Mount Lemmon	Mount Lemmon Survey	EUN	960 m	MPC; JPL
690020	2013 VB_{54}	—	November 9, 2013	Haleakala	Pan-STARRS 1	·	710 m	MPC; JPL
690021	2013 VL_{54}	—	November 8, 2013	Mount Lemmon	Mount Lemmon Survey	DOR	1.6 km	MPC; JPL
690022	2013 VM_{54}	—	November 9, 2013	Haleakala	Pan-STARRS 1	HNS	810 m	MPC; JPL
690023	2013 VY_{55}	—	November 11, 2013	Kitt Peak	Spacewatch	·	1.2 km	MPC; JPL
690024	2013 VG_{56}	—	November 9, 2013	Haleakala	Pan-STARRS 1	·	1.2 km	MPC; JPL
690025	2013 VE_{58}	—	November 4, 2013	Mount Lemmon	Mount Lemmon Survey	·	910 m	MPC; JPL
690026	2013 VK_{58}	—	November 10, 2013	Mount Lemmon	Mount Lemmon Survey	·	1.5 km	MPC; JPL
690027	2013 VS_{66}	—	November 2, 2013	Catalina	CSS	·	1.7 km	MPC; JPL
690028	2013 VP_{73}	—	November 11, 2013	Mount Lemmon	Mount Lemmon Survey	(5)	700 m	MPC; JPL
690029	2013 VO_{75}	—	November 9, 2013	Haleakala	Pan-STARRS 1	3:2	4.0 km	MPC; JPL
690030	2013 VG_{84}	—	November 10, 2013	Mount Lemmon	Mount Lemmon Survey	·	1.3 km	MPC; JPL
690031	2013 VK_{84}	—	November 1, 2013	Mount Lemmon	Mount Lemmon Survey	EUN	750 m	MPC; JPL
690032	2013 WN_{2}	—	October 26, 2013	Mount Lemmon	Mount Lemmon Survey	·	980 m	MPC; JPL
690033	2013 WU_{2}	—	October 13, 2013	Catalina	CSS	·	1.4 km	MPC; JPL
690034	2013 WW_{5}	—	July 18, 2013	Haleakala	Pan-STARRS 1	·	1.5 km	MPC; JPL
690035	2013 WO_{8}	—	October 25, 2013	Kitt Peak	Spacewatch	·	1.3 km	MPC; JPL
690036	2013 WS_{11}	—	October 26, 2013	Mount Lemmon	Mount Lemmon Survey	·	1.2 km	MPC; JPL
690037	2013 WZ_{17}	—	September 20, 2008	Mount Lemmon	Mount Lemmon Survey	·	1.1 km	MPC; JPL
690038	2013 WV_{18}	—	August 31, 2005	Palomar	NEAT	V	720 m	MPC; JPL
690039	2013 WV_{22}	—	November 6, 2013	Haleakala	Pan-STARRS 1	·	1.1 km	MPC; JPL
690040	2013 WQ_{30}	—	November 3, 2013	Haleakala	Pan-STARRS 1	·	1.7 km	MPC; JPL
690041	2013 WK_{40}	—	October 1, 1998	Kitt Peak	Spacewatch	·	880 m	MPC; JPL
690042	2013 WU_{42}	—	November 10, 2013	Mount Lemmon	Mount Lemmon Survey	·	1.2 km	MPC; JPL
690043	2013 WD_{60}	—	November 10, 2013	Kitt Peak	Spacewatch	ADE	1.6 km	MPC; JPL
690044	2013 WK_{61}	—	February 1, 2006	Mount Lemmon	Mount Lemmon Survey	·	1.1 km	MPC; JPL
690045	2013 WP_{65}	—	November 26, 2013	Haleakala	Pan-STARRS 1	EUN	980 m	MPC; JPL
690046	2013 WE_{69}	—	October 24, 2013	Kitt Peak	Spacewatch	·	1.2 km	MPC; JPL
690047	2013 WL_{89}	—	November 28, 2013	Mount Lemmon	Mount Lemmon Survey	·	910 m	MPC; JPL
690048	2013 WN_{90}	—	October 26, 2013	Mount Lemmon	Mount Lemmon Survey	·	1.4 km	MPC; JPL
690049	2013 WB_{95}	—	November 28, 2013	Mount Lemmon	Mount Lemmon Survey	·	1.1 km	MPC; JPL
690050	2013 WJ_{102}	—	October 14, 1999	Kitt Peak	Spacewatch	AEO	1.0 km	MPC; JPL
690051	2013 WS_{104}	—	February 24, 2006	Mount Lemmon	Mount Lemmon Survey	·	1.3 km	MPC; JPL
690052	2013 WJ_{110}	—	February 28, 2008	Kitt Peak	Spacewatch	3:2	3.7 km	MPC; JPL
690053	2013 WL_{114}	—	August 6, 2017	Haleakala	Pan-STARRS 1	·	1.6 km	MPC; JPL
690054	2013 WM_{115}	—	November 28, 2013	Mount Lemmon	Mount Lemmon Survey	·	1.5 km	MPC; JPL
690055	2013 WN_{115}	—	June 8, 2016	Mount Lemmon	Mount Lemmon Survey	·	1.2 km	MPC; JPL
690056	2013 WW_{115}	—	September 23, 2017	Haleakala	Pan-STARRS 1	·	970 m	MPC; JPL
690057	2013 WC_{117}	—	February 27, 2015	Haleakala	Pan-STARRS 1	·	1.2 km	MPC; JPL
690058	2013 WD_{121}	—	March 22, 2015	Haleakala	Pan-STARRS 1	·	1.1 km	MPC; JPL
690059	2013 WS_{122}	—	November 28, 2013	Mount Lemmon	Mount Lemmon Survey	WIT	690 m	MPC; JPL
690060	2013 WS_{123}	—	November 28, 2013	Mount Lemmon	Mount Lemmon Survey	·	1.3 km	MPC; JPL
690061	2013 WX_{123}	—	November 27, 2013	Haleakala	Pan-STARRS 1	·	1.6 km	MPC; JPL
690062	2013 WY_{123}	—	November 27, 2013	Haleakala	Pan-STARRS 1	·	1.3 km	MPC; JPL
690063	2013 WJ_{125}	—	February 16, 2015	Haleakala	Pan-STARRS 1	·	1.1 km	MPC; JPL
690064	2013 WV_{125}	—	November 26, 2013	Mount Lemmon	Mount Lemmon Survey	·	1.1 km	MPC; JPL
690065	2013 WH_{126}	—	November 27, 2013	Haleakala	Pan-STARRS 1	·	920 m	MPC; JPL
690066	2013 WX_{126}	—	November 29, 2013	Mount Lemmon	Mount Lemmon Survey	·	1.7 km	MPC; JPL
690067	2013 WS_{127}	—	November 28, 2013	Mount Lemmon	Mount Lemmon Survey	·	1.4 km	MPC; JPL
690068	2013 WK_{128}	—	November 27, 2013	Haleakala	Pan-STARRS 1	·	1.6 km	MPC; JPL
690069	2013 WL_{128}	—	November 27, 2013	Haleakala	Pan-STARRS 1	·	1.3 km	MPC; JPL
690070	2013 WN_{128}	—	November 28, 2013	Mount Lemmon	Mount Lemmon Survey	ADE	1.6 km	MPC; JPL
690071	2013 WF_{133}	—	November 27, 2013	Mount Lemmon	Mount Lemmon Survey	·	980 m	MPC; JPL
690072	2013 WC_{134}	—	November 28, 2013	Mount Lemmon	Mount Lemmon Survey	(5)	1.1 km	MPC; JPL
690073	2013 WT_{135}	—	November 28, 2013	Haleakala	Pan-STARRS 1	VER	2.3 km	MPC; JPL
690074	2013 WA_{136}	—	November 27, 2013	Haleakala	Pan-STARRS 1	·	1.3 km	MPC; JPL
690075	2013 WP_{137}	—	November 28, 2013	Kitt Peak	Spacewatch	·	1.0 km	MPC; JPL
690076	2013 WZ_{137}	—	November 28, 2013	Mount Lemmon	Mount Lemmon Survey	·	1.5 km	MPC; JPL
690077	2013 WD_{138}	—	November 28, 2013	Mount Lemmon	Mount Lemmon Survey	·	790 m	MPC; JPL
690078	2013 WQ_{141}	—	November 27, 2013	Haleakala	Pan-STARRS 1	·	950 m	MPC; JPL
690079	2013 XO_{24}	—	October 9, 2013	Mount Lemmon	Mount Lemmon Survey	·	1.4 km	MPC; JPL
690080	2013 XY_{27}	—	November 30, 2005	Kitt Peak	Spacewatch	·	800 m	MPC; JPL
690081	2013 XH_{32}	—	December 11, 2013	Haleakala	Pan-STARRS 1	·	1.4 km	MPC; JPL
690082	2013 XO_{32}	—	October 30, 2017	Haleakala	Pan-STARRS 1	·	1.1 km	MPC; JPL
690083	2013 YH	—	September 29, 2013	Mount Lemmon	Mount Lemmon Survey	EUN	1.2 km	MPC; JPL
690084	2013 YJ_{4}	—	December 11, 2013	Haleakala	Pan-STARRS 1	·	1.5 km	MPC; JPL
690085	2013 YX_{17}	—	September 25, 2012	Kitt Peak	Spacewatch	AGN	1.1 km	MPC; JPL
690086	2013 YT_{23}	—	October 26, 2013	Kitt Peak	Spacewatch	·	1.3 km	MPC; JPL
690087	2013 YJ_{25}	—	November 2, 2013	Mount Lemmon	Mount Lemmon Survey	·	1.0 km	MPC; JPL
690088	2013 YJ_{28}	—	December 23, 2013	Mount Lemmon	Mount Lemmon Survey	·	1.6 km	MPC; JPL
690089	2013 YK_{31}	—	December 25, 2013	Mount Lemmon	Mount Lemmon Survey	·	1.6 km	MPC; JPL
690090	2013 YT_{33}	—	December 26, 2013	Mount Lemmon	Mount Lemmon Survey	·	1.6 km	MPC; JPL
690091	2013 YO_{38}	—	December 10, 2009	Mount Lemmon	Mount Lemmon Survey	·	990 m	MPC; JPL
690092 Stuhr	2013 YW_{38}	Stuhr	November 28, 2013	Tincana	Tincana	EUN	1.1 km	MPC; JPL
690093	2013 YB_{39}	—	November 27, 2013	Haleakala	Pan-STARRS 1	MIS	1.7 km	MPC; JPL
690094	2013 YA_{40}	—	December 24, 2013	Mount Lemmon	Mount Lemmon Survey	·	1.7 km	MPC; JPL
690095	2013 YZ_{41}	—	December 25, 2013	Haleakala	Pan-STARRS 1	HNS	950 m	MPC; JPL
690096	2013 YH_{46}	—	August 29, 2005	Kitt Peak	Spacewatch	V	560 m	MPC; JPL
690097	2013 YQ_{48}	—	November 2, 2013	Mount Lemmon	Mount Lemmon Survey	·	1.1 km	MPC; JPL
690098	2013 YU_{50}	—	December 13, 2013	Mount Lemmon	Mount Lemmon Survey	·	1.9 km	MPC; JPL
690099	2013 YD_{52}	—	January 8, 2010	Kitt Peak	Spacewatch	·	1.5 km	MPC; JPL
690100	2013 YC_{54}	—	October 9, 2008	Mount Lemmon	Mount Lemmon Survey	·	1.3 km	MPC; JPL

== 690101–690200 ==
back to top

Designation			Discovery			Properties		Ref
Permanent	Provisional	Named after	Date	Site	Discoverer(s)	Category	Diam.	Ref
690101	2013 YL_{65}	—	December 28, 2013	Mayhill-ISON	L. Elenin	·	1.8 km	MPC; JPL
690102	2013 YV_{66}	—	November 26, 2013	Mount Lemmon	Mount Lemmon Survey	·	1.2 km	MPC; JPL
690103	2013 YL_{71}	—	November 21, 2009	Mount Lemmon	Mount Lemmon Survey	·	1.4 km	MPC; JPL
690104	2013 YB_{77}	—	December 27, 2013	Kitt Peak	Spacewatch	HNS	940 m	MPC; JPL
690105	2013 YV_{78}	—	December 28, 2013	Kitt Peak	Spacewatch	·	1.3 km	MPC; JPL
690106	2013 YG_{79}	—	August 12, 2002	Cerro Tololo	Deep Ecliptic Survey	·	1.4 km	MPC; JPL
690107	2013 YA_{84}	—	September 22, 2009	Kitt Peak	Spacewatch	·	710 m	MPC; JPL
690108	2013 YY_{84}	—	December 31, 1999	Kitt Peak	Spacewatch	GEF	900 m	MPC; JPL
690109	2013 YU_{85}	—	November 22, 2008	Kitt Peak	Spacewatch	·	1.5 km	MPC; JPL
690110	2013 YX_{85}	—	September 11, 2007	Mount Lemmon	Mount Lemmon Survey	·	2.1 km	MPC; JPL
690111	2013 YS_{86}	—	December 1, 2008	Kitt Peak	Spacewatch	·	1.5 km	MPC; JPL
690112	2013 YB_{90}	—	October 22, 2003	Kitt Peak	Spacewatch	·	1.7 km	MPC; JPL
690113	2013 YU_{90}	—	January 30, 2006	Kitt Peak	Spacewatch	·	1.2 km	MPC; JPL
690114	2013 YV_{91}	—	December 29, 2013	Haleakala	Pan-STARRS 1	EUN	810 m	MPC; JPL
690115	2013 YH_{94}	—	August 13, 2012	Haleakala	Pan-STARRS 1	·	1.4 km	MPC; JPL
690116	2013 YW_{94}	—	December 15, 2006	Kitt Peak	Spacewatch	·	690 m	MPC; JPL
690117	2013 YT_{98}	—	December 31, 2013	Kitt Peak	Spacewatch	·	1.1 km	MPC; JPL
690118	2013 YU_{99}	—	December 31, 2013	Kitt Peak	Spacewatch	·	1.5 km	MPC; JPL
690119	2013 YQ_{100}	—	December 31, 2013	Mount Lemmon	Mount Lemmon Survey	·	1.6 km	MPC; JPL
690120	2013 YY_{100}	—	December 26, 2013	Mount Lemmon	Mount Lemmon Survey	·	1.2 km	MPC; JPL
690121	2013 YW_{101}	—	December 6, 2013	Haleakala	Pan-STARRS 1	V	680 m	MPC; JPL
690122	2013 YV_{106}	—	December 24, 2013	Mount Lemmon	Mount Lemmon Survey	·	460 m	MPC; JPL
690123	2013 YQ_{108}	—	April 18, 2015	Cerro Tololo	DECam	·	1.5 km	MPC; JPL
690124	2013 YR_{113}	—	December 30, 2013	Kitt Peak	Spacewatch	·	1.2 km	MPC; JPL
690125	2013 YU_{114}	—	October 9, 2012	Mount Lemmon	Mount Lemmon Survey	HOF	2.0 km	MPC; JPL
690126	2013 YK_{115}	—	April 14, 2007	Kitt Peak	Spacewatch	·	1.1 km	MPC; JPL
690127	2013 YC_{116}	—	September 28, 2008	Mount Lemmon	Mount Lemmon Survey	·	900 m	MPC; JPL
690128	2013 YN_{119}	—	December 30, 2013	Haleakala	Pan-STARRS 1	·	1.5 km	MPC; JPL
690129	2013 YR_{122}	—	December 30, 2013	Haleakala	Pan-STARRS 1	·	1.3 km	MPC; JPL
690130	2013 YP_{126}	—	December 31, 2013	Mount Lemmon	Mount Lemmon Survey	·	1.2 km	MPC; JPL
690131	2013 YK_{127}	—	December 31, 2013	Mount Lemmon	Mount Lemmon Survey	·	1.6 km	MPC; JPL
690132	2013 YG_{128}	—	August 6, 2008	Siding Spring	SSS	(194)	1.7 km	MPC; JPL
690133	2013 YJ_{134}	—	December 20, 2009	Kitt Peak	Spacewatch	·	1.2 km	MPC; JPL
690134	2013 YQ_{134}	—	December 31, 2013	Mount Lemmon	Mount Lemmon Survey	·	1.4 km	MPC; JPL
690135	2013 YQ_{138}	—	September 23, 2008	Kitt Peak	Spacewatch	·	1.2 km	MPC; JPL
690136	2013 YE_{142}	—	September 17, 1998	Kitt Peak	Spacewatch	MAS	690 m	MPC; JPL
690137	2013 YL_{142}	—	November 28, 2013	Mount Lemmon	Mount Lemmon Survey	·	1.3 km	MPC; JPL
690138	2013 YE_{144}	—	June 15, 2012	Kitt Peak	Spacewatch	·	1.4 km	MPC; JPL
690139	2013 YE_{151}	—	February 1, 2006	Kitt Peak	Spacewatch	·	1.1 km	MPC; JPL
690140	2013 YJ_{154}	—	December 28, 2013	Mount Lemmon	Mount Lemmon Survey	·	1.8 km	MPC; JPL
690141	2013 YX_{154}	—	March 30, 2011	Mount Lemmon	Mount Lemmon Survey	·	2.4 km	MPC; JPL
690142	2013 YP_{159}	—	December 24, 2013	Mount Lemmon	Mount Lemmon Survey	(18466)	1.7 km	MPC; JPL
690143	2013 YZ_{159}	—	December 30, 2013	Kitt Peak	Spacewatch	·	1.3 km	MPC; JPL
690144	2013 YP_{163}	—	December 30, 2013	Haleakala	Pan-STARRS 1	·	1.3 km	MPC; JPL
690145	2013 YN_{167}	—	December 24, 2013	Mount Lemmon	Mount Lemmon Survey	·	1.4 km	MPC; JPL
690146	2013 YM_{169}	—	December 25, 2013	Mount Lemmon	Mount Lemmon Survey	·	1.2 km	MPC; JPL
690147	2013 YX_{169}	—	December 28, 2013	Kitt Peak	Spacewatch	·	900 m	MPC; JPL
690148	2013 YA_{170}	—	December 31, 2013	Kitt Peak	Spacewatch	·	1.7 km	MPC; JPL
690149	2013 YA_{173}	—	December 30, 2013	Haleakala	Pan-STARRS 1	centaur	40 km	MPC; JPL
690150	2013 YW_{173}	—	December 31, 2013	Mount Lemmon	Mount Lemmon Survey	·	1.2 km	MPC; JPL
690151	2014 AH_{10}	—	November 10, 2013	Mount Lemmon	Mount Lemmon Survey	·	1.5 km	MPC; JPL
690152	2014 AO_{26}	—	January 4, 2014	Mount Lemmon	Mount Lemmon Survey	HNS	840 m	MPC; JPL
690153	2014 AR_{30}	—	January 3, 2014	Mount Lemmon	Mount Lemmon Survey	GAL	1.3 km	MPC; JPL
690154	2014 AG_{31}	—	January 4, 2014	Mount Lemmon	Mount Lemmon Survey	·	1.4 km	MPC; JPL
690155	2014 AU_{37}	—	September 30, 2009	Mount Lemmon	Mount Lemmon Survey	·	950 m	MPC; JPL
690156	2014 AL_{39}	—	September 6, 2012	Mount Lemmon	Mount Lemmon Survey	·	1.5 km	MPC; JPL
690157	2014 AE_{47}	—	January 7, 2014	Kitt Peak	Spacewatch	·	1.5 km	MPC; JPL
690158	2014 AU_{60}	—	January 9, 2014	Mount Lemmon	Mount Lemmon Survey	·	1.5 km	MPC; JPL
690159	2014 AX_{65}	—	April 18, 2015	Haleakala	Pan-STARRS 1	EUN	970 m	MPC; JPL
690160	2014 AO_{68}	—	January 10, 2014	Kitt Peak	Spacewatch	·	1.4 km	MPC; JPL
690161	2014 AM_{69}	—	January 9, 2014	Mount Lemmon	Mount Lemmon Survey	·	510 m	MPC; JPL
690162	2014 AW_{69}	—	January 10, 2014	Kitt Peak	Spacewatch	·	1.4 km	MPC; JPL
690163	2014 AT_{70}	—	January 9, 2014	Mount Lemmon	Mount Lemmon Survey	·	2.2 km	MPC; JPL
690164	2014 AV_{71}	—	January 1, 2014	Mount Lemmon	Mount Lemmon Survey	·	450 m	MPC; JPL
690165	2014 AS_{73}	—	January 2, 2014	Kitt Peak	Spacewatch	AGN	870 m	MPC; JPL
690166	2014 AS_{74}	—	January 3, 2014	Oukaïmeden	C. Rinner	·	1.9 km	MPC; JPL
690167	2014 AY_{77}	—	January 9, 2014	Kitt Peak	Spacewatch	·	1.8 km	MPC; JPL
690168	2014 AZ_{77}	—	January 2, 2014	Kitt Peak	Spacewatch	HNS	910 m	MPC; JPL
690169	2014 BT_{1}	—	September 25, 2012	Mount Lemmon	Mount Lemmon Survey	·	1.3 km	MPC; JPL
690170	2014 BY_{3}	—	October 1, 2005	Kitt Peak	Spacewatch	NYS	1.1 km	MPC; JPL
690171	2014 BU_{7}	—	December 30, 2013	Mount Lemmon	Mount Lemmon Survey	·	1.1 km	MPC; JPL
690172	2014 BM_{8}	—	January 21, 2014	Haleakala	Pan-STARRS 1	H	330 m	MPC; JPL
690173	2014 BE_{9}	—	January 18, 2014	Haleakala	Pan-STARRS 1	H	400 m	MPC; JPL
690174	2014 BE_{12}	—	November 7, 2008	Mount Lemmon	Mount Lemmon Survey	·	1.5 km	MPC; JPL
690175	2014 BG_{13}	—	September 14, 2002	Haleakala	NEAT	·	810 m	MPC; JPL
690176	2014 BG_{14}	—	January 23, 2014	Kitt Peak	Spacewatch	EUN	980 m	MPC; JPL
690177	2014 BM_{15}	—	January 23, 2014	Mount Lemmon	Mount Lemmon Survey	PAD	1.2 km	MPC; JPL
690178	2014 BT_{16}	—	January 2, 2014	Kitt Peak	Spacewatch	·	1.3 km	MPC; JPL
690179	2014 BP_{17}	—	January 11, 2014	Kitt Peak	Spacewatch	(5)	1.0 km	MPC; JPL
690180	2014 BW_{18}	—	October 11, 2012	Haleakala	Pan-STARRS 1	·	1.6 km	MPC; JPL
690181	2014 BU_{26}	—	December 25, 2013	Mount Lemmon	Mount Lemmon Survey	T_{j} (2.98) · 3:2 · (6124)	3.7 km	MPC; JPL
690182	2014 BY_{26}	—	October 28, 2008	Kitt Peak	Spacewatch	·	1.4 km	MPC; JPL
690183	2014 BG_{28}	—	December 27, 2006	Kitt Peak	Spacewatch	·	680 m	MPC; JPL
690184	2014 BT_{34}	—	December 25, 2005	Kitt Peak	Spacewatch	NYS	1.0 km	MPC; JPL
690185	2014 BY_{41}	—	January 1, 2014	Kitt Peak	Spacewatch	·	1.8 km	MPC; JPL
690186	2014 BR_{42}	—	October 17, 2012	Mount Lemmon	Mount Lemmon Survey	·	2.0 km	MPC; JPL
690187	2014 BL_{46}	—	October 10, 2012	Mount Lemmon	Mount Lemmon Survey	·	1.7 km	MPC; JPL
690188	2014 BP_{49}	—	January 10, 2011	Mount Lemmon	Mount Lemmon Survey	·	970 m	MPC; JPL
690189	2014 BK_{51}	—	January 24, 2014	Mount Lemmon	Mount Lemmon Survey	·	1.0 km	MPC; JPL
690190	2014 BH_{67}	—	January 21, 2014	Mount Lemmon	Mount Lemmon Survey	·	1.8 km	MPC; JPL
690191	2014 BW_{67}	—	September 15, 2012	La Sagra	OAM	·	2.0 km	MPC; JPL
690192	2014 BH_{70}	—	January 3, 2014	Kitt Peak	Spacewatch	·	1.5 km	MPC; JPL
690193	2014 BE_{74}	—	January 24, 2014	Haleakala	Pan-STARRS 1	·	1.5 km	MPC; JPL
690194	2014 BC_{76}	—	January 23, 2014	Mount Lemmon	Mount Lemmon Survey	·	1.3 km	MPC; JPL
690195	2014 BK_{77}	—	January 26, 2014	Haleakala	Pan-STARRS 1	·	1.6 km	MPC; JPL
690196	2014 BY_{77}	—	January 23, 2014	Kitt Peak	Spacewatch	MRX	830 m	MPC; JPL
690197	2014 BM_{78}	—	October 18, 2012	Haleakala	Pan-STARRS 1	HOF	2.0 km	MPC; JPL
690198	2014 BA_{79}	—	October 20, 2003	Kitt Peak	Spacewatch	PAD	1.4 km	MPC; JPL
690199	2014 BQ_{79}	—	January 25, 2014	Haleakala	Pan-STARRS 1	·	430 m	MPC; JPL
690200	2014 BG_{81}	—	January 25, 2014	Haleakala	Pan-STARRS 1	·	460 m	MPC; JPL

== 690201–690300 ==
back to top

Designation			Discovery			Properties		Ref
Permanent	Provisional	Named after	Date	Site	Discoverer(s)	Category	Diam.	Ref
690201	2014 BT_{82}	—	January 29, 2014	Kitt Peak	Spacewatch	·	960 m	MPC; JPL
690202	2014 BQ_{84}	—	January 28, 2014	Kitt Peak	Spacewatch	HOF	2.0 km	MPC; JPL
690203	2014 BO_{86}	—	January 24, 2014	Haleakala	Pan-STARRS 1	·	1.4 km	MPC; JPL
690204	2014 BW_{86}	—	January 24, 2014	Haleakala	Pan-STARRS 1	AGN	870 m	MPC; JPL
690205	2014 BA_{87}	—	January 24, 2014	Haleakala	Pan-STARRS 1	·	1.5 km	MPC; JPL
690206	2014 BC_{88}	—	January 23, 2014	Mount Lemmon	Mount Lemmon Survey	·	1.9 km	MPC; JPL
690207	2014 BD_{90}	—	February 25, 2011	Kitt Peak	Spacewatch	·	520 m	MPC; JPL
690208	2014 BY_{92}	—	January 24, 2014	Haleakala	Pan-STARRS 1	·	2.1 km	MPC; JPL
690209	2014 CK_{6}	—	October 9, 2012	Catalina	CSS	EUN	1.3 km	MPC; JPL
690210	2014 CO_{6}	—	October 28, 2006	Kitt Peak	Spacewatch	·	490 m	MPC; JPL
690211	2014 CX_{8}	—	September 24, 2012	Mount Lemmon	Mount Lemmon Survey	·	1.3 km	MPC; JPL
690212	2014 CM_{9}	—	March 18, 2010	Mount Lemmon	Mount Lemmon Survey	·	1.2 km	MPC; JPL
690213	2014 CU_{12}	—	January 24, 2014	Haleakala	Pan-STARRS 1	·	1.4 km	MPC; JPL
690214	2014 CH_{18}	—	February 9, 2014	Haleakala	Pan-STARRS 1	·	1.9 km	MPC; JPL
690215	2014 CJ_{19}	—	March 12, 2010	Kitt Peak	Spacewatch	·	1.8 km	MPC; JPL
690216	2014 CE_{23}	—	October 6, 2012	Haleakala	Pan-STARRS 1	HNS	1.3 km	MPC; JPL
690217	2014 CV_{26}	—	February 10, 2014	Haleakala	Pan-STARRS 1	·	1.5 km	MPC; JPL
690218	2014 CT_{27}	—	February 10, 2014	Haleakala	Pan-STARRS 1	·	1.1 km	MPC; JPL
690219	2014 CS_{30}	—	August 2, 2016	Haleakala	Pan-STARRS 1	·	1.7 km	MPC; JPL
690220	2014 CO_{32}	—	February 10, 2014	Mount Lemmon	Mount Lemmon Survey	·	1.1 km	MPC; JPL
690221	2014 CZ_{32}	—	February 10, 2014	Haleakala	Pan-STARRS 1	L4	7.5 km	MPC; JPL
690222	2014 CH_{33}	—	February 10, 2014	Haleakala	Pan-STARRS 1	·	490 m	MPC; JPL
690223	2014 DF_{1}	—	February 18, 2014	Mount Lemmon	Mount Lemmon Survey	·	1.9 km	MPC; JPL
690224	2014 DX_{4}	—	February 6, 2014	Mount Lemmon	Mount Lemmon Survey	·	1.5 km	MPC; JPL
690225	2014 DC_{11}	—	February 21, 2014	Haleakala	Pan-STARRS 1	H	450 m	MPC; JPL
690226	2014 DY_{13}	—	November 21, 2008	Kitt Peak	Spacewatch	·	1.4 km	MPC; JPL
690227	2014 DH_{17}	—	March 9, 2005	Mount Lemmon	Mount Lemmon Survey	·	1.5 km	MPC; JPL
690228	2014 DG_{18}	—	January 23, 2014	Kitt Peak	Spacewatch	·	1.4 km	MPC; JPL
690229	2014 DJ_{18}	—	February 10, 2014	Haleakala	Pan-STARRS 1	THB	2.8 km	MPC; JPL
690230	2014 DG_{20}	—	February 22, 2014	Kitt Peak	Spacewatch	·	580 m	MPC; JPL
690231	2014 DW_{21}	—	August 17, 2010	Sierra Stars	T. Vorobjov	H	290 m	MPC; JPL
690232	2014 DV_{36}	—	March 29, 2009	Kitt Peak	Spacewatch	·	1.5 km	MPC; JPL
690233	2014 DU_{39}	—	October 31, 2005	Mauna Kea	A. Boattini	·	1.2 km	MPC; JPL
690234	2014 DU_{46}	—	September 11, 2004	Kitt Peak	Spacewatch	V	550 m	MPC; JPL
690235	2014 DV_{48}	—	February 20, 2001	Haleakala	NEAT	·	1.3 km	MPC; JPL
690236	2014 DX_{48}	—	September 29, 2003	Kitt Peak	Spacewatch	·	1.3 km	MPC; JPL
690237	2014 DX_{52}	—	October 20, 2007	Mount Lemmon	Mount Lemmon Survey	·	1.7 km	MPC; JPL
690238	2014 DW_{53}	—	March 2, 2009	Kitt Peak	Spacewatch	·	1.4 km	MPC; JPL
690239	2014 DP_{54}	—	August 24, 2011	Haleakala	Pan-STARRS 1	KOR	1.1 km	MPC; JPL
690240	2014 DN_{58}	—	November 8, 2009	Mount Lemmon	Mount Lemmon Survey	·	480 m	MPC; JPL
690241	2014 DJ_{62}	—	November 8, 2007	Kitt Peak	Spacewatch	KOR	1.1 km	MPC; JPL
690242	2014 DZ_{63}	—	February 26, 2014	Haleakala	Pan-STARRS 1	·	500 m	MPC; JPL
690243	2014 DQ_{64}	—	February 26, 2014	Haleakala	Pan-STARRS 1	·	590 m	MPC; JPL
690244	2014 DS_{65}	—	September 26, 2003	Apache Point	SDSS	·	1.0 km	MPC; JPL
690245	2014 DW_{65}	—	February 26, 2014	Haleakala	Pan-STARRS 1	·	1.3 km	MPC; JPL
690246	2014 DK_{68}	—	February 26, 2014	Haleakala	Pan-STARRS 1	·	1.6 km	MPC; JPL
690247	2014 DC_{69}	—	February 26, 2014	Haleakala	Pan-STARRS 1	·	480 m	MPC; JPL
690248	2014 DP_{73}	—	April 17, 2010	Mount Lemmon	Mount Lemmon Survey	·	1.6 km	MPC; JPL
690249	2014 DE_{77}	—	February 26, 2014	Haleakala	Pan-STARRS 1	·	580 m	MPC; JPL
690250	2014 DF_{77}	—	December 16, 2007	Kitt Peak	Spacewatch	·	1.6 km	MPC; JPL
690251	2014 DL_{78}	—	February 26, 2014	Haleakala	Pan-STARRS 1	·	1.4 km	MPC; JPL
690252	2014 DP_{79}	—	October 30, 2007	Mount Lemmon	Mount Lemmon Survey	AST	1.5 km	MPC; JPL
690253	2014 DE_{80}	—	February 24, 2014	Haleakala	Pan-STARRS 1	APO	450 m	MPC; JPL
690254	2014 DT_{80}	—	February 19, 2014	Mount Lemmon	Mount Lemmon Survey	·	1.6 km	MPC; JPL
690255	2014 DT_{83}	—	February 25, 2014	Kitt Peak	Spacewatch	KOR	1.0 km	MPC; JPL
690256	2014 DW_{88}	—	September 28, 2003	Kitt Peak	Spacewatch	(5)	1.3 km	MPC; JPL
690257	2014 DA_{92}	—	January 10, 2013	Haleakala	Pan-STARRS 1	L4	6.1 km	MPC; JPL
690258	2014 DF_{92}	—	September 11, 2007	Mount Lemmon	Mount Lemmon Survey	AGN	950 m	MPC; JPL
690259	2014 DY_{92}	—	February 9, 2014	Haleakala	Pan-STARRS 1	L4	6.7 km	MPC; JPL
690260	2014 DY_{95}	—	February 27, 2014	Kitt Peak	Spacewatch	·	1.5 km	MPC; JPL
690261	2014 DA_{96}	—	February 26, 2014	Haleakala	Pan-STARRS 1	·	900 m	MPC; JPL
690262	2014 DC_{99}	—	February 27, 2014	Mount Lemmon	Mount Lemmon Survey	HOF	1.9 km	MPC; JPL
690263	2014 DA_{100}	—	February 6, 2014	Mount Lemmon	Mount Lemmon Survey	AGN	880 m	MPC; JPL
690264	2014 DJ_{100}	—	August 23, 2007	Kitt Peak	Spacewatch	·	1.4 km	MPC; JPL
690265	2014 DL_{101}	—	August 23, 2003	Cerro Tololo	Deep Ecliptic Survey	·	1.1 km	MPC; JPL
690266	2014 DY_{101}	—	February 27, 2014	Mount Lemmon	Mount Lemmon Survey	AGN	910 m	MPC; JPL
690267	2014 DH_{102}	—	February 27, 2014	Mount Lemmon	Mount Lemmon Survey	L4	6.3 km	MPC; JPL
690268	2014 DM_{103}	—	September 12, 2002	Palomar	NEAT	·	570 m	MPC; JPL
690269	2014 DQ_{103}	—	May 23, 2011	Nogales	M. Schwartz, P. R. Holvorcem	·	560 m	MPC; JPL
690270	2014 DD_{110}	—	January 16, 2005	Mauna Kea	Veillet, C.	·	1.1 km	MPC; JPL
690271	2014 DG_{111}	—	July 27, 2011	Haleakala	Pan-STARRS 1	EUN	1.1 km	MPC; JPL
690272	2014 DG_{113}	—	March 8, 2003	Kitt Peak	Spacewatch	·	970 m	MPC; JPL
690273	2014 DF_{118}	—	October 18, 2003	Kitt Peak	Spacewatch	·	1.6 km	MPC; JPL
690274	2014 DW_{126}	—	March 11, 2005	Mount Lemmon	Mount Lemmon Survey	·	1.7 km	MPC; JPL
690275	2014 DR_{127}	—	February 28, 2014	Haleakala	Pan-STARRS 1	NAE	1.5 km	MPC; JPL
690276	2014 DK_{129}	—	February 28, 2014	Haleakala	Pan-STARRS 1	KOR	1.2 km	MPC; JPL
690277	2014 DS_{136}	—	February 28, 2014	Haleakala	Pan-STARRS 1	·	1.3 km	MPC; JPL
690278	2014 DM_{137}	—	February 3, 2009	Kitt Peak	Spacewatch	BRA	1 km	MPC; JPL
690279	2014 DW_{147}	—	February 26, 2014	Haleakala	Pan-STARRS 1	KOR	1.2 km	MPC; JPL
690280	2014 DA_{151}	—	August 26, 2012	Haleakala	Pan-STARRS 1	·	550 m	MPC; JPL
690281	2014 DB_{152}	—	February 26, 2014	Haleakala	Pan-STARRS 1	KOR	1.1 km	MPC; JPL
690282	2014 DW_{155}	—	March 29, 2000	Kitt Peak	Spacewatch	·	860 m	MPC; JPL
690283	2014 DY_{155}	—	February 28, 2014	Haleakala	Pan-STARRS 1	·	480 m	MPC; JPL
690284	2014 DD_{156}	—	December 11, 2012	Mount Lemmon	Mount Lemmon Survey	·	1.4 km	MPC; JPL
690285	2014 DW_{156}	—	June 26, 2015	Haleakala	Pan-STARRS 1	·	1.6 km	MPC; JPL
690286	2014 DW_{157}	—	February 26, 2014	Haleakala	Pan-STARRS 1	EOS	1.3 km	MPC; JPL
690287	2014 DR_{160}	—	February 28, 2014	Mount Lemmon	Mount Lemmon Survey	·	1.7 km	MPC; JPL
690288	2014 DN_{166}	—	December 14, 2017	Haleakala	Pan-STARRS 1	HOF	2.2 km	MPC; JPL
690289	2014 DW_{167}	—	December 4, 2008	Mount Lemmon	Mount Lemmon Survey	·	1.6 km	MPC; JPL
690290	2014 DR_{168}	—	February 26, 2014	Haleakala	Pan-STARRS 1	·	1.6 km	MPC; JPL
690291	2014 DT_{168}	—	February 28, 2014	Haleakala	Pan-STARRS 1	L4	7.0 km	MPC; JPL
690292	2014 DZ_{170}	—	February 28, 2014	Mount Lemmon	Mount Lemmon Survey	·	2.2 km	MPC; JPL
690293	2014 DF_{175}	—	February 26, 2014	Haleakala	Pan-STARRS 1	·	430 m	MPC; JPL
690294	2014 DM_{178}	—	February 28, 2014	Haleakala	Pan-STARRS 1	·	1.2 km	MPC; JPL
690295	2014 DT_{178}	—	February 26, 2014	Haleakala	Pan-STARRS 1	·	520 m	MPC; JPL
690296	2014 DS_{180}	—	October 11, 2012	Haleakala	Pan-STARRS 1	·	900 m	MPC; JPL
690297	2014 DB_{181}	—	February 27, 2014	Kitt Peak	Spacewatch	MAS	540 m	MPC; JPL
690298	2014 DT_{183}	—	February 20, 2014	Mount Lemmon	Mount Lemmon Survey	·	1.5 km	MPC; JPL
690299	2014 DZ_{186}	—	February 28, 2014	Haleakala	Pan-STARRS 1	KOR	1.1 km	MPC; JPL
690300	2014 DN_{187}	—	February 27, 2014	Haleakala	Pan-STARRS 1	KOR	1.0 km	MPC; JPL

== 690301–690400 ==
back to top

Designation			Discovery			Properties		Ref
Permanent	Provisional	Named after	Date	Site	Discoverer(s)	Category	Diam.	Ref
690301	2014 DW_{187}	—	February 26, 2014	Haleakala	Pan-STARRS 1	EOS	1.4 km	MPC; JPL
690302	2014 DJ_{188}	—	February 26, 2014	Haleakala	Pan-STARRS 1	·	1.7 km	MPC; JPL
690303	2014 DU_{188}	—	February 28, 2014	Haleakala	Pan-STARRS 1	·	520 m	MPC; JPL
690304	2014 DY_{188}	—	October 10, 2007	Kitt Peak	Spacewatch	KOR	1.1 km	MPC; JPL
690305	2014 DZ_{188}	—	February 26, 2014	Haleakala	Pan-STARRS 1	·	1.7 km	MPC; JPL
690306	2014 DF_{189}	—	February 22, 2014	Mount Lemmon	Mount Lemmon Survey	·	1.8 km	MPC; JPL
690307	2014 DO_{189}	—	February 26, 2014	Mount Lemmon	Mount Lemmon Survey	KOR	1.2 km	MPC; JPL
690308	2014 DW_{189}	—	February 26, 2014	Haleakala	Pan-STARRS 1	·	410 m	MPC; JPL
690309	2014 DY_{189}	—	February 26, 2014	Haleakala	Pan-STARRS 1	·	1.4 km	MPC; JPL
690310	2014 DF_{190}	—	February 26, 2014	Haleakala	Pan-STARRS 1	KOR	1.1 km	MPC; JPL
690311	2014 DK_{190}	—	February 28, 2014	Haleakala	Pan-STARRS 1	·	1.4 km	MPC; JPL
690312	2014 DR_{190}	—	February 24, 2014	Haleakala	Pan-STARRS 1	·	1.7 km	MPC; JPL
690313	2014 DT_{190}	—	February 26, 2014	Mount Lemmon	Mount Lemmon Survey	·	1.6 km	MPC; JPL
690314	2014 DN_{191}	—	February 26, 2014	Haleakala	Pan-STARRS 1	L4	6.2 km	MPC; JPL
690315	2014 DF_{192}	—	February 26, 2014	Haleakala	Pan-STARRS 1	MAS	540 m	MPC; JPL
690316	2014 DT_{192}	—	February 27, 2014	Haleakala	Pan-STARRS 1	EOS	1.4 km	MPC; JPL
690317	2014 DA_{194}	—	February 28, 2014	Haleakala	Pan-STARRS 1	·	490 m	MPC; JPL
690318	2014 DK_{194}	—	February 26, 2014	Haleakala	Pan-STARRS 1	(16286)	1.2 km	MPC; JPL
690319	2014 DZ_{194}	—	October 22, 2012	Haleakala	Pan-STARRS 1	·	1.5 km	MPC; JPL
690320	2014 DA_{195}	—	February 26, 2014	Haleakala	Pan-STARRS 1	·	1.2 km	MPC; JPL
690321	2014 DB_{198}	—	February 28, 2014	Haleakala	Pan-STARRS 1	KOR	980 m	MPC; JPL
690322	2014 DZ_{200}	—	February 26, 2014	Haleakala	Pan-STARRS 1	·	2.0 km	MPC; JPL
690323	2014 EP_{1}	—	September 20, 2011	Haleakala	Pan-STARRS 1	KOR	1.3 km	MPC; JPL
690324	2014 EJ_{6}	—	February 22, 2014	Kitt Peak	Spacewatch	·	450 m	MPC; JPL
690325	2014 EN_{11}	—	March 7, 2014	Mount Lemmon	Mount Lemmon Survey	·	1.6 km	MPC; JPL
690326	2014 EC_{13}	—	March 5, 2014	Kitt Peak	Spacewatch	·	1.1 km	MPC; JPL
690327	2014 EM_{13}	—	February 27, 2014	Kitt Peak	Spacewatch	EUN	960 m	MPC; JPL
690328	2014 EN_{13}	—	March 5, 2014	Kitt Peak	Spacewatch	·	1.6 km	MPC; JPL
690329	2014 EV_{15}	—	October 22, 2003	Kitt Peak	Spacewatch	·	1.4 km	MPC; JPL
690330	2014 EK_{16}	—	February 25, 2014	Kitt Peak	Spacewatch	·	1.5 km	MPC; JPL
690331	2014 EY_{18}	—	March 6, 2014	Kitt Peak	Spacewatch	·	1.2 km	MPC; JPL
690332	2014 EL_{19}	—	September 19, 2007	Kitt Peak	Spacewatch	·	1.4 km	MPC; JPL
690333	2014 EJ_{20}	—	March 6, 2014	Kitt Peak	Spacewatch	·	1.3 km	MPC; JPL
690334	2014 EK_{21}	—	February 28, 2014	Haleakala	Pan-STARRS 1	KOR	1.1 km	MPC; JPL
690335	2014 EN_{22}	—	May 22, 2011	Mount Lemmon	Mount Lemmon Survey	·	490 m	MPC; JPL
690336	2014 EZ_{25}	—	September 23, 2012	Mount Lemmon	Mount Lemmon Survey	·	1.3 km	MPC; JPL
690337	2014 EQ_{27}	—	February 28, 2014	Haleakala	Pan-STARRS 1	·	1.5 km	MPC; JPL
690338	2014 EC_{29}	—	October 15, 2001	Palomar	NEAT	V	730 m	MPC; JPL
690339	2014 ET_{30}	—	December 22, 2008	Kitt Peak	Spacewatch	·	1.4 km	MPC; JPL
690340	2014 EP_{31}	—	February 26, 2014	Haleakala	Pan-STARRS 1	·	1.5 km	MPC; JPL
690341	2014 EH_{34}	—	February 26, 2014	Haleakala	Pan-STARRS 1	·	1.6 km	MPC; JPL
690342	2014 EB_{38}	—	March 8, 2014	Mount Lemmon	Mount Lemmon Survey	·	1.6 km	MPC; JPL
690343	2014 ES_{38}	—	March 8, 2014	Mount Lemmon	Mount Lemmon Survey	(16286)	1.4 km	MPC; JPL
690344	2014 EN_{39}	—	January 3, 2009	Mount Lemmon	Mount Lemmon Survey	·	1.6 km	MPC; JPL
690345	2014 EN_{42}	—	March 8, 2014	Mount Lemmon	Mount Lemmon Survey	·	490 m	MPC; JPL
690346	2014 ES_{43}	—	August 28, 2005	Kitt Peak	Spacewatch	·	650 m	MPC; JPL
690347	2014 EY_{46}	—	October 10, 2007	Kitt Peak	Spacewatch	·	1.7 km	MPC; JPL
690348	2014 ES_{54}	—	March 2, 2014	Cerro Tololo	DECam	·	1.5 km	MPC; JPL
690349	2014 ER_{58}	—	October 22, 2012	Haleakala	Pan-STARRS 1	·	500 m	MPC; JPL
690350	2014 EN_{59}	—	September 21, 2011	Mount Lemmon	Mount Lemmon Survey	·	1.6 km	MPC; JPL
690351	2014 ER_{59}	—	April 1, 2011	Kitt Peak	Spacewatch	·	500 m	MPC; JPL
690352	2014 EP_{63}	—	June 11, 2015	Haleakala	Pan-STARRS 1	·	2.2 km	MPC; JPL
690353	2014 EX_{63}	—	March 2, 2014	Cerro Tololo	DECam	·	1.4 km	MPC; JPL
690354	2014 EQ_{67}	—	October 17, 2012	Kitt Peak	Spacewatch	·	1.4 km	MPC; JPL
690355	2014 EV_{71}	—	February 28, 2014	Haleakala	Pan-STARRS 1	KOR	1.1 km	MPC; JPL
690356	2014 EE_{82}	—	July 9, 1997	Kitt Peak	Spacewatch	·	1.8 km	MPC; JPL
690357	2014 EB_{95}	—	September 12, 2015	Haleakala	Pan-STARRS 1	·	430 m	MPC; JPL
690358	2014 EO_{95}	—	October 9, 2007	Mount Lemmon	Mount Lemmon Survey	HOF	1.8 km	MPC; JPL
690359	2014 EN_{99}	—	May 25, 2015	Haleakala	Pan-STARRS 1	·	1.6 km	MPC; JPL
690360	2014 ED_{104}	—	December 1, 2003	Kitt Peak	Spacewatch	·	1.4 km	MPC; JPL
690361	2014 EY_{104}	—	January 15, 2009	Kitt Peak	Spacewatch	AGN	830 m	MPC; JPL
690362	2014 EH_{105}	—	August 31, 2011	Kitt Peak	Spacewatch	HOF	2.1 km	MPC; JPL
690363	2014 EX_{109}	—	October 10, 2016	Haleakala	Pan-STARRS 1	·	1.7 km	MPC; JPL
690364	2014 EG_{111}	—	November 22, 2012	Kitt Peak	Spacewatch	·	1.6 km	MPC; JPL
690365	2014 EO_{111}	—	July 26, 2011	Haleakala	Pan-STARRS 1	615	990 m	MPC; JPL
690366	2014 EX_{114}	—	September 23, 2008	Kitt Peak	Spacewatch	(5)	940 m	MPC; JPL
690367	2014 EK_{123}	—	February 20, 2014	Mount Lemmon	Mount Lemmon Survey	·	1.7 km	MPC; JPL
690368	2014 EB_{127}	—	May 20, 2015	Cerro Tololo	DECam	·	1.6 km	MPC; JPL
690369	2014 ED_{131}	—	September 26, 2006	Kitt Peak	Spacewatch	EOS	1.2 km	MPC; JPL
690370	2014 ES_{131}	—	February 28, 2014	Haleakala	Pan-STARRS 1	·	1.4 km	MPC; JPL
690371	2014 EG_{133}	—	September 27, 2016	Haleakala	Pan-STARRS 1	MAR	690 m	MPC; JPL
690372	2014 EX_{138}	—	October 25, 2016	Haleakala	Pan-STARRS 1	BRA	1.1 km	MPC; JPL
690373	2014 EW_{145}	—	February 28, 2014	Haleakala	Pan-STARRS 1	·	970 m	MPC; JPL
690374	2014 EE_{150}	—	June 5, 2016	Haleakala	Pan-STARRS 1	·	1.7 km	MPC; JPL
690375	2014 EG_{164}	—	September 13, 2007	Kitt Peak	Spacewatch	WIT	840 m	MPC; JPL
690376	2014 EZ_{174}	—	July 7, 2016	Mount Lemmon	Mount Lemmon Survey	·	1.6 km	MPC; JPL
690377	2014 EM_{179}	—	July 19, 2015	Haleakala	Pan-STARRS 1	·	430 m	MPC; JPL
690378	2014 EH_{180}	—	June 11, 2015	Haleakala	Pan-STARRS 1	·	1.6 km	MPC; JPL
690379	2014 EZ_{185}	—	August 28, 2006	Kitt Peak	Spacewatch	·	1.4 km	MPC; JPL
690380	2014 EO_{186}	—	November 7, 2007	Kitt Peak	Spacewatch	·	1.4 km	MPC; JPL
690381	2014 EG_{189}	—	March 6, 2014	Haleakala	Pan-STARRS 1	·	1.9 km	MPC; JPL
690382	2014 EQ_{191}	—	May 15, 2015	Haleakala	Pan-STARRS 1	(31811)	2.4 km	MPC; JPL
690383	2014 EY_{194}	—	September 12, 2016	Haleakala	Pan-STARRS 1	·	1.5 km	MPC; JPL
690384	2014 ER_{196}	—	August 10, 2016	Haleakala	Pan-STARRS 1	AGN	900 m	MPC; JPL
690385	2014 EY_{197}	—	September 2, 2016	Mount Lemmon	Mount Lemmon Survey	·	1.6 km	MPC; JPL
690386	2014 EV_{198}	—	September 18, 2009	Kitt Peak	Spacewatch	L4	6.5 km	MPC; JPL
690387	2014 EE_{222}	—	September 20, 2007	Kitt Peak	Spacewatch	·	1.8 km	MPC; JPL
690388	2014 EQ_{225}	—	August 3, 2016	Haleakala	Pan-STARRS 1	·	1.3 km	MPC; JPL
690389	2014 EP_{229}	—	September 21, 2012	Kitt Peak	Spacewatch	·	1.6 km	MPC; JPL
690390	2014 EL_{232}	—	September 12, 2007	Mount Lemmon	Mount Lemmon Survey	·	1.5 km	MPC; JPL
690391	2014 EY_{232}	—	December 6, 2012	Mount Lemmon	Mount Lemmon Survey	·	1.4 km	MPC; JPL
690392	2014 EA_{233}	—	July 9, 2015	Haleakala	Pan-STARRS 1	·	1.9 km	MPC; JPL
690393	2014 EB_{238}	—	May 3, 2010	Kitt Peak	Spacewatch	·	1.7 km	MPC; JPL
690394	2014 EO_{238}	—	August 28, 2016	Mount Lemmon	Mount Lemmon Survey	·	1.4 km	MPC; JPL
690395	2014 EU_{238}	—	October 13, 2010	Mount Lemmon	Mount Lemmon Survey	L4	6.9 km	MPC; JPL
690396	2014 EJ_{243}	—	November 7, 2012	Mount Lemmon	Mount Lemmon Survey	·	1.4 km	MPC; JPL
690397	2014 ES_{244}	—	September 25, 2016	Mount Lemmon	Mount Lemmon Survey	·	1.5 km	MPC; JPL
690398	2014 EL_{249}	—	March 10, 2014	Kitt Peak	Spacewatch	·	1.6 km	MPC; JPL
690399	2014 EV_{253}	—	March 8, 2014	Mount Lemmon	Mount Lemmon Survey	·	1.4 km	MPC; JPL
690400	2014 EC_{254}	—	March 12, 2014	Kitt Peak	Spacewatch	·	530 m	MPC; JPL

== 690401–690500 ==
back to top

Designation			Discovery			Properties		Ref
Permanent	Provisional	Named after	Date	Site	Discoverer(s)	Category	Diam.	Ref
690401	2014 EG_{256}	—	March 6, 2014	Kitt Peak	Spacewatch	·	1.4 km	MPC; JPL
690402	2014 EY_{256}	—	March 10, 2014	Mount Lemmon	Mount Lemmon Survey	·	2.0 km	MPC; JPL
690403	2014 EG_{257}	—	March 5, 2014	Kitt Peak	Spacewatch	·	1.9 km	MPC; JPL
690404	2014 EM_{257}	—	March 11, 2014	Mount Lemmon	Mount Lemmon Survey	L4	6.3 km	MPC; JPL
690405	2014 ET_{258}	—	March 11, 2014	Mount Lemmon	Mount Lemmon Survey	·	1.6 km	MPC; JPL
690406	2014 EJ_{259}	—	March 6, 2014	Mount Lemmon	Mount Lemmon Survey	·	1.5 km	MPC; JPL
690407	2014 EK_{259}	—	May 22, 2011	Mount Lemmon	Mount Lemmon Survey	·	600 m	MPC; JPL
690408	2014 FG_{8}	—	February 26, 2014	Haleakala	Pan-STARRS 1	·	1.6 km	MPC; JPL
690409	2014 FZ_{13}	—	March 20, 2014	Mount Lemmon	Mount Lemmon Survey	L4	6.8 km	MPC; JPL
690410	2014 FJ_{15}	—	February 26, 2014	Haleakala	Pan-STARRS 1	·	2.0 km	MPC; JPL
690411	2014 FR_{23}	—	October 15, 2001	Kitt Peak	Spacewatch	·	970 m	MPC; JPL
690412	2014 FH_{42}	—	February 9, 2014	Kitt Peak	Spacewatch	·	1.7 km	MPC; JPL
690413	2014 FC_{45}	—	March 11, 2014	Mount Lemmon	Mount Lemmon Survey	TEL	960 m	MPC; JPL
690414	2014 FB_{47}	—	April 1, 2003	Kitt Peak	Deep Ecliptic Survey	NYS	1.3 km	MPC; JPL
690415	2014 FJ_{50}	—	June 4, 2010	Nogales	M. Schwartz, P. R. Holvorcem	JUN	1.1 km	MPC; JPL
690416	2014 FK_{54}	—	March 28, 2014	Mount Lemmon	Mount Lemmon Survey	·	520 m	MPC; JPL
690417	2014 FR_{54}	—	October 7, 2012	Haleakala	Pan-STARRS 1	·	1.1 km	MPC; JPL
690418	2014 FK_{56}	—	March 31, 2014	Mount Lemmon	Mount Lemmon Survey	·	1.7 km	MPC; JPL
690419	2014 FN_{56}	—	January 18, 2008	Mount Lemmon	Mount Lemmon Survey	EOS	1.5 km	MPC; JPL
690420	2014 FC_{72}	—	March 24, 2014	Haleakala	Pan-STARRS 1	SDO	431 km	MPC; JPL
690421	2014 FS_{76}	—	March 28, 2014	Haleakala	Pan-STARRS 1	·	1.6 km	MPC; JPL
690422	2014 FT_{76}	—	March 20, 2014	Mount Lemmon	Mount Lemmon Survey	·	460 m	MPC; JPL
690423	2014 FV_{77}	—	October 9, 2016	Haleakala	Pan-STARRS 1	HOF	1.8 km	MPC; JPL
690424	2014 FP_{79}	—	March 24, 2014	Haleakala	Pan-STARRS 1	·	1.5 km	MPC; JPL
690425	2014 FD_{81}	—	August 2, 2016	Haleakala	Pan-STARRS 1	·	1.9 km	MPC; JPL
690426	2014 FO_{81}	—	March 31, 2014	Kitt Peak	Spacewatch	·	2.0 km	MPC; JPL
690427	2014 FN_{87}	—	March 20, 2014	Haleakala	Pan-STARRS 1	·	2.0 km	MPC; JPL
690428	2014 FU_{87}	—	March 22, 2014	Mount Lemmon	Mount Lemmon Survey	·	1.8 km	MPC; JPL
690429	2014 FJ_{88}	—	March 29, 2014	Mount Lemmon	Mount Lemmon Survey	·	1.6 km	MPC; JPL
690430	2014 FN_{88}	—	March 23, 2014	Mount Lemmon	Mount Lemmon Survey	L4	7.2 km	MPC; JPL
690431	2014 FO_{88}	—	March 29, 2014	Mount Lemmon	Mount Lemmon Survey	·	1.7 km	MPC; JPL
690432	2014 FN_{89}	—	March 24, 2014	Haleakala	Pan-STARRS 1	·	1.4 km	MPC; JPL
690433	2014 FL_{90}	—	February 26, 2014	Haleakala	Pan-STARRS 1	KOR	1.2 km	MPC; JPL
690434	2014 GE	—	February 26, 2014	Haleakala	Pan-STARRS 1	KOR	1.3 km	MPC; JPL
690435	2014 GA_{2}	—	October 26, 2008	Kitt Peak	Spacewatch	·	1.1 km	MPC; JPL
690436	2014 GD_{3}	—	April 1, 2014	Mount Lemmon	Mount Lemmon Survey	·	1.4 km	MPC; JPL
690437	2014 GH_{3}	—	April 1, 2014	Mount Lemmon	Mount Lemmon Survey	·	1.2 km	MPC; JPL
690438	2014 GN_{4}	—	April 1, 2014	Mount Lemmon	Mount Lemmon Survey	·	1.3 km	MPC; JPL
690439	2014 GF_{6}	—	March 12, 2014	Kitt Peak	Spacewatch	·	560 m	MPC; JPL
690440	2014 GQ_{10}	—	November 24, 2012	Kitt Peak	Spacewatch	·	1.1 km	MPC; JPL
690441	2014 GA_{13}	—	November 22, 2005	Kitt Peak	Spacewatch	·	970 m	MPC; JPL
690442	2014 GD_{17}	—	April 4, 2014	Elena Remote	Oreshko, A.	·	1.1 km	MPC; JPL
690443	2014 GT_{20}	—	March 13, 2010	Mount Lemmon	Mount Lemmon Survey	·	1.4 km	MPC; JPL
690444	2014 GS_{26}	—	October 24, 2008	Kitt Peak	Spacewatch	·	1.4 km	MPC; JPL
690445	2014 GN_{29}	—	April 2, 2014	Kitt Peak	Spacewatch	·	540 m	MPC; JPL
690446	2014 GZ_{35}	—	January 28, 2004	Kitt Peak	Spacewatch	AGN	1.0 km	MPC; JPL
690447	2014 GL_{39}	—	March 24, 2014	Haleakala	Pan-STARRS 1	·	640 m	MPC; JPL
690448	2014 GS_{40}	—	March 22, 2014	Mount Lemmon	Mount Lemmon Survey	·	1.8 km	MPC; JPL
690449	2014 GN_{43}	—	April 6, 2014	Mount Lemmon	Mount Lemmon Survey	·	1.4 km	MPC; JPL
690450	2014 GS_{58}	—	March 1, 2009	Mount Lemmon	Mount Lemmon Survey	·	1.7 km	MPC; JPL
690451	2014 GJ_{59}	—	March 3, 2009	Mount Lemmon	Mount Lemmon Survey	AGN	1.1 km	MPC; JPL
690452	2014 GS_{60}	—	April 4, 2014	Haleakala	Pan-STARRS 1	·	1.2 km	MPC; JPL
690453	2014 GY_{60}	—	April 4, 2014	Haleakala	Pan-STARRS 1	·	1.4 km	MPC; JPL
690454	2014 GZ_{60}	—	April 4, 2014	Haleakala	Pan-STARRS 1	·	2.0 km	MPC; JPL
690455	2014 GV_{63}	—	April 5, 2014	Haleakala	Pan-STARRS 1	·	490 m	MPC; JPL
690456	2014 GK_{65}	—	April 9, 2014	Haleakala	Pan-STARRS 1	centaur	240 km	MPC; JPL
690457	2014 GN_{65}	—	April 5, 2014	Haleakala	Pan-STARRS 1	·	1.5 km	MPC; JPL
690458	2014 GT_{69}	—	April 10, 2014	Haleakala	Pan-STARRS 1	·	1.7 km	MPC; JPL
690459	2014 GX_{71}	—	April 5, 2014	Haleakala	Pan-STARRS 1	·	1.3 km	MPC; JPL
690460	2014 GL_{75}	—	April 5, 2014	Haleakala	Pan-STARRS 1	·	1.5 km	MPC; JPL
690461	2014 GQ_{79}	—	April 5, 2014	Haleakala	Pan-STARRS 1	KOR	1.1 km	MPC; JPL
690462	2014 GV_{80}	—	April 5, 2014	Haleakala	Pan-STARRS 1	·	630 m	MPC; JPL
690463	2014 GE_{84}	—	April 5, 2014	Haleakala	Pan-STARRS 1	·	1.4 km	MPC; JPL
690464	2014 GJ_{85}	—	April 4, 2014	Haleakala	Pan-STARRS 1	·	2.3 km	MPC; JPL
690465	2014 GT_{87}	—	April 9, 2014	Mount Lemmon	Mount Lemmon Survey	·	2.0 km	MPC; JPL
690466	2014 GX_{87}	—	April 4, 2014	Haleakala	Pan-STARRS 1	·	1.9 km	MPC; JPL
690467	2014 GN_{88}	—	April 7, 2014	Mount Lemmon	Mount Lemmon Survey	·	1.7 km	MPC; JPL
690468	2014 GQ_{92}	—	April 5, 2014	Haleakala	Pan-STARRS 1	·	1.3 km	MPC; JPL
690469	2014 HT_{7}	—	April 4, 2014	Haleakala	Pan-STARRS 1	·	1.4 km	MPC; JPL
690470	2014 HH_{10}	—	April 10, 2005	Mount Lemmon	Mount Lemmon Survey	·	1.6 km	MPC; JPL
690471	2014 HK_{10}	—	April 12, 2005	Kitt Peak	Deep Ecliptic Survey	·	1.6 km	MPC; JPL
690472	2014 HZ_{13}	—	April 5, 2014	Haleakala	Pan-STARRS 1	KOR	970 m	MPC; JPL
690473	2014 HC_{15}	—	April 21, 2014	Mount Lemmon	Mount Lemmon Survey	·	1.7 km	MPC; JPL
690474	2014 HG_{15}	—	August 28, 2006	Kitt Peak	Spacewatch	·	1.5 km	MPC; JPL
690475	2014 HE_{18}	—	September 26, 2003	Apache Point	SDSS Collaboration	·	1.2 km	MPC; JPL
690476	2014 HK_{19}	—	September 19, 2007	Kitt Peak	Spacewatch	·	1.3 km	MPC; JPL
690477	2014 HH_{20}	—	September 26, 2011	Mount Lemmon	Mount Lemmon Survey	·	1.1 km	MPC; JPL
690478	2014 HE_{21}	—	September 27, 2006	Kitt Peak	Spacewatch	AGN	1.1 km	MPC; JPL
690479	2014 HJ_{26}	—	February 17, 2010	Mount Lemmon	Mount Lemmon Survey	V	620 m	MPC; JPL
690480	2014 HG_{31}	—	November 7, 2012	Haleakala	Pan-STARRS 1	·	490 m	MPC; JPL
690481	2014 HH_{31}	—	April 6, 2014	Mount Lemmon	Mount Lemmon Survey	·	1.5 km	MPC; JPL
690482	2014 HO_{31}	—	April 23, 2014	Cerro Tololo	DECam	·	570 m	MPC; JPL
690483	2014 HQ_{31}	—	February 9, 2010	Kitt Peak	Spacewatch	·	1.1 km	MPC; JPL
690484	2014 HZ_{35}	—	April 4, 2014	Haleakala	Pan-STARRS 1	·	980 m	MPC; JPL
690485	2014 HR_{36}	—	January 17, 2013	Haleakala	Pan-STARRS 1	·	1.1 km	MPC; JPL
690486	2014 HJ_{38}	—	February 28, 2008	Mount Lemmon	Mount Lemmon Survey	·	2.0 km	MPC; JPL
690487	2014 HJ_{40}	—	January 25, 2006	Kitt Peak	Spacewatch	V	510 m	MPC; JPL
690488	2014 HF_{44}	—	September 22, 2008	Kitt Peak	Spacewatch	·	450 m	MPC; JPL
690489	2014 HL_{44}	—	April 24, 2014	Haleakala	Pan-STARRS 1	·	1.3 km	MPC; JPL
690490	2014 HZ_{48}	—	March 29, 2009	Mount Lemmon	Mount Lemmon Survey	BRA	890 m	MPC; JPL
690491	2014 HR_{70}	—	April 5, 2014	Haleakala	Pan-STARRS 1	·	2.3 km	MPC; JPL
690492	2014 HV_{72}	—	April 23, 2014	Cerro Tololo	DECam	KOR	930 m	MPC; JPL
690493	2014 HX_{72}	—	August 18, 2006	Kitt Peak	Spacewatch	·	1.7 km	MPC; JPL
690494	2014 HK_{86}	—	October 22, 2011	Mount Lemmon	Mount Lemmon Survey	·	1.5 km	MPC; JPL
690495	2014 HU_{86}	—	August 1, 2000	Cerro Tololo	Deep Ecliptic Survey	·	1.2 km	MPC; JPL
690496	2014 HQ_{92}	—	October 6, 2008	Mount Lemmon	Mount Lemmon Survey	·	550 m	MPC; JPL
690497	2014 HQ_{93}	—	April 24, 2014	Mount Lemmon	Mount Lemmon Survey	·	1.6 km	MPC; JPL
690498	2014 HY_{102}	—	January 19, 2004	Kitt Peak	Spacewatch	·	1.6 km	MPC; JPL
690499	2014 HU_{111}	—	April 5, 2014	Haleakala	Pan-STARRS 1	·	1.5 km	MPC; JPL
690500	2014 HH_{113}	—	April 24, 2014	Mount Lemmon	Mount Lemmon Survey	·	560 m	MPC; JPL

== 690501–690600 ==
back to top

Designation			Discovery			Properties		Ref
Permanent	Provisional	Named after	Date	Site	Discoverer(s)	Category	Diam.	Ref
690501	2014 HZ_{114}	—	October 26, 2011	Haleakala	Pan-STARRS 1	·	1.6 km	MPC; JPL
690502	2014 HS_{116}	—	September 10, 2007	Kitt Peak	Spacewatch	·	960 m	MPC; JPL
690503	2014 HE_{125}	—	April 4, 2014	Haleakala	Pan-STARRS 1	·	2.2 km	MPC; JPL
690504	2014 HM_{125}	—	April 6, 2003	Kitt Peak	Spacewatch	·	1.1 km	MPC; JPL
690505	2014 HR_{128}	—	September 13, 2004	Palomar	NEAT	·	2.7 km	MPC; JPL
690506	2014 HT_{133}	—	April 5, 2014	Haleakala	Pan-STARRS 1	·	1.7 km	MPC; JPL
690507	2014 HG_{134}	—	April 23, 2014	Cerro Tololo	DECam	·	1.1 km	MPC; JPL
690508	2014 HF_{137}	—	April 5, 2014	Haleakala	Pan-STARRS 1	·	430 m	MPC; JPL
690509	2014 HC_{138}	—	April 23, 2014	Cerro Tololo	DECam	HOF	2.2 km	MPC; JPL
690510	2014 HT_{139}	—	April 5, 2014	Haleakala	Pan-STARRS 1	·	1.1 km	MPC; JPL
690511	2014 HP_{142}	—	April 23, 2014	Cerro Tololo	DECam	KOR	1.1 km	MPC; JPL
690512	2014 HA_{144}	—	January 20, 2009	Mount Lemmon	Mount Lemmon Survey	·	1.6 km	MPC; JPL
690513	2014 HL_{146}	—	April 1, 2014	Mount Lemmon	Mount Lemmon Survey	·	500 m	MPC; JPL
690514	2014 HG_{150}	—	October 10, 2008	Kitt Peak	Spacewatch	·	460 m	MPC; JPL
690515	2014 HM_{150}	—	January 10, 2007	Kitt Peak	Spacewatch	·	470 m	MPC; JPL
690516	2014 HY_{151}	—	March 24, 2014	Haleakala	Pan-STARRS 1	·	550 m	MPC; JPL
690517	2014 HG_{153}	—	April 23, 2014	Cerro Tololo	DECam	·	1.7 km	MPC; JPL
690518	2014 HW_{158}	—	April 24, 2014	Mount Lemmon	Mount Lemmon Survey	EOS	1.4 km	MPC; JPL
690519	2014 HV_{162}	—	April 24, 2014	Mount Lemmon	Mount Lemmon Survey	·	3.3 km	MPC; JPL
690520	2014 HH_{165}	—	April 5, 2014	Haleakala	Pan-STARRS 1	·	1.8 km	MPC; JPL
690521	2014 HO_{166}	—	December 20, 2007	Mount Lemmon	Mount Lemmon Survey	·	2.3 km	MPC; JPL
690522	2014 HN_{167}	—	October 23, 2011	Haleakala	Pan-STARRS 1	ARM	3.1 km	MPC; JPL
690523	2014 HR_{169}	—	April 7, 2014	Mount Lemmon	Mount Lemmon Survey	·	1.4 km	MPC; JPL
690524	2014 HJ_{171}	—	March 28, 2014	Mount Lemmon	Mount Lemmon Survey	V	560 m	MPC; JPL
690525	2014 HF_{172}	—	April 29, 2014	Haleakala	Pan-STARRS 1	·	1.7 km	MPC; JPL
690526	2014 HF_{174}	—	April 5, 2014	Haleakala	Pan-STARRS 1	·	1.5 km	MPC; JPL
690527	2014 HX_{174}	—	January 3, 2009	Mount Lemmon	Mount Lemmon Survey	·	1.6 km	MPC; JPL
690528	2014 HP_{175}	—	October 6, 2002	Palomar	NEAT	·	1.4 km	MPC; JPL
690529	2014 HX_{175}	—	November 24, 2012	Kitt Peak	Spacewatch	·	580 m	MPC; JPL
690530	2014 HY_{177}	—	April 28, 2014	Haleakala	Pan-STARRS 1	H	430 m	MPC; JPL
690531	2014 HM_{179}	—	March 27, 2003	Kitt Peak	Spacewatch	MAS	700 m	MPC; JPL
690532	2014 HS_{181}	—	April 28, 2014	Haleakala	Pan-STARRS 1	·	510 m	MPC; JPL
690533	2014 HV_{183}	—	April 30, 2014	Haleakala	Pan-STARRS 1	·	1.5 km	MPC; JPL
690534	2014 HA_{186}	—	April 5, 2014	Haleakala	Pan-STARRS 1	·	580 m	MPC; JPL
690535	2014 HZ_{187}	—	October 20, 2007	Mount Lemmon	Mount Lemmon Survey	·	1.7 km	MPC; JPL
690536	2014 HQ_{188}	—	March 21, 2014	XuYi	PMO NEO Survey Program	·	2.6 km	MPC; JPL
690537	2014 HM_{192}	—	October 9, 2012	Haleakala	Pan-STARRS 1	H	220 m	MPC; JPL
690538	2014 HN_{195}	—	November 3, 2007	Catalina	CSS	H	560 m	MPC; JPL
690539	2014 HJ_{200}	—	September 24, 1998	Kitt Peak	Spacewatch	·	590 m	MPC; JPL
690540	2014 HC_{204}	—	May 5, 2006	Kitt Peak	Spacewatch	·	1.0 km	MPC; JPL
690541	2014 HT_{205}	—	April 28, 2014	Mount Lemmon	Mount Lemmon Survey	BRA	1.1 km	MPC; JPL
690542	2014 HY_{205}	—	April 29, 2014	Haleakala	Pan-STARRS 1	EOS	1.3 km	MPC; JPL
690543	2014 HC_{206}	—	April 23, 2001	Kitt Peak	Spacewatch	·	1.4 km	MPC; JPL
690544	2014 HD_{207}	—	April 30, 2014	Haleakala	Pan-STARRS 1	HOF	2.3 km	MPC; JPL
690545	2014 HC_{208}	—	March 14, 2007	Mount Lemmon	Mount Lemmon Survey	·	620 m	MPC; JPL
690546	2014 HF_{208}	—	April 29, 2014	Kitt Peak	Spacewatch	(5)	1.0 km	MPC; JPL
690547	2014 HN_{213}	—	September 12, 2015	Haleakala	Pan-STARRS 1	·	580 m	MPC; JPL
690548	2014 HO_{216}	—	April 28, 2014	Kitt Peak	Spacewatch	·	1.8 km	MPC; JPL
690549	2014 HN_{217}	—	January 4, 2013	Cerro Tololo	DECam	·	1.1 km	MPC; JPL
690550	2014 HW_{218}	—	April 30, 2014	Haleakala	Pan-STARRS 1	·	1.3 km	MPC; JPL
690551	2014 HP_{220}	—	April 23, 2014	Mount Lemmon	Mount Lemmon Survey	EOS	1.4 km	MPC; JPL
690552	2014 HZ_{220}	—	April 24, 2014	Mount Lemmon	Mount Lemmon Survey	·	550 m	MPC; JPL
690553	2014 HA_{221}	—	April 30, 2014	Haleakala	Pan-STARRS 1	·	570 m	MPC; JPL
690554	2014 HS_{221}	—	April 29, 2014	Haleakala	Pan-STARRS 1	·	1.6 km	MPC; JPL
690555	2014 HY_{221}	—	April 29, 2014	Haleakala	Pan-STARRS 1	·	1.6 km	MPC; JPL
690556	2014 HJ_{224}	—	April 29, 2014	Haleakala	Pan-STARRS 1	·	1.2 km	MPC; JPL
690557	2014 HZ_{230}	—	April 30, 2014	Haleakala	Pan-STARRS 1	·	1.4 km	MPC; JPL
690558	2014 HF_{232}	—	April 30, 2014	Haleakala	Pan-STARRS 1	·	470 m	MPC; JPL
690559	2014 HO_{237}	—	April 23, 2014	Haleakala	Pan-STARRS 1	·	510 m	MPC; JPL
690560	2014 HR_{237}	—	April 21, 2014	Mount Lemmon	Mount Lemmon Survey	·	1.4 km	MPC; JPL
690561	2014 HA_{239}	—	April 28, 2014	Cerro Tololo	DECam	EOS	1.1 km	MPC; JPL
690562	2014 HY_{242}	—	November 24, 2011	Mount Lemmon	Mount Lemmon Survey	EOS	1.2 km	MPC; JPL
690563	2014 HH_{285}	—	January 18, 2005	Kitt Peak	Spacewatch	·	1.0 km	MPC; JPL
690564	2014 HG_{289}	—	April 23, 2014	Cerro Tololo	DECam	·	1.4 km	MPC; JPL
690565	2014 HY_{295}	—	April 24, 2014	Mount Lemmon	Mount Lemmon Survey	·	1.4 km	MPC; JPL
690566	2014 HU_{296}	—	June 2, 2014	Haleakala	Pan-STARRS 1	·	560 m	MPC; JPL
690567	2014 HD_{308}	—	April 23, 2014	Cerro Tololo	DECam	EOS	1.1 km	MPC; JPL
690568	2014 HV_{315}	—	May 3, 2014	Mount Lemmon	Mount Lemmon Survey	·	1.3 km	MPC; JPL
690569	2014 HL_{326}	—	April 23, 2014	Cerro Tololo	DECam	KOR	950 m	MPC; JPL
690570	2014 HP_{332}	—	April 28, 2014	Cerro Tololo	DECam	·	1.6 km	MPC; JPL
690571	2014 HB_{338}	—	April 27, 2009	Kitt Peak	Spacewatch	·	2.1 km	MPC; JPL
690572	2014 HN_{350}	—	April 30, 2014	Haleakala	Pan-STARRS 1	EOS	1.3 km	MPC; JPL
690573	2014 HH_{366}	—	April 28, 2014	Cerro Tololo	DECam	EOS	1.2 km	MPC; JPL
690574	2014 JA_{7}	—	January 7, 2010	Mount Lemmon	Mount Lemmon Survey	·	590 m	MPC; JPL
690575	2014 JZ_{7}	—	January 15, 2007	Mauna Kea	P. A. Wiegert	KOR	1.4 km	MPC; JPL
690576	2014 JE_{8}	—	August 27, 2006	Kitt Peak	Spacewatch	·	1.8 km	MPC; JPL
690577	2014 JK_{14}	—	May 3, 2014	Mount Lemmon	Mount Lemmon Survey	T_{j} (2.9)	5.6 km	MPC; JPL
690578	2014 JH_{18}	—	February 28, 2014	Haleakala	Pan-STARRS 1	KOR	1.3 km	MPC; JPL
690579	2014 JL_{18}	—	May 3, 2014	Mount Lemmon	Mount Lemmon Survey	KOR	1.3 km	MPC; JPL
690580	2014 JY_{19}	—	October 20, 2007	Mount Lemmon	Mount Lemmon Survey	·	1.6 km	MPC; JPL
690581	2014 JF_{23}	—	May 4, 2014	Mount Lemmon	Mount Lemmon Survey	·	2.3 km	MPC; JPL
690582	2014 JK_{26}	—	May 4, 2014	Kitt Peak	Spacewatch	·	1.7 km	MPC; JPL
690583	2014 JH_{30}	—	April 30, 2014	Haleakala	Pan-STARRS 1	·	590 m	MPC; JPL
690584	2014 JJ_{36}	—	April 16, 2007	Mount Lemmon	Mount Lemmon Survey	·	510 m	MPC; JPL
690585	2014 JN_{38}	—	February 14, 2010	Mount Lemmon	Mount Lemmon Survey	·	560 m	MPC; JPL
690586	2014 JN_{41}	—	February 8, 2013	Nogales	M. Schwartz, P. R. Holvorcem	·	1.5 km	MPC; JPL
690587	2014 JH_{42}	—	September 30, 2003	Apache Point	SDSS	·	1.7 km	MPC; JPL
690588	2014 JM_{44}	—	April 23, 2014	Haleakala	Pan-STARRS 1	3:2	4.5 km	MPC; JPL
690589	2014 JX_{44}	—	April 5, 2014	Haleakala	Pan-STARRS 1	·	520 m	MPC; JPL
690590	2014 JG_{47}	—	May 6, 2014	Haleakala	Pan-STARRS 1	·	580 m	MPC; JPL
690591	2014 JQ_{52}	—	September 18, 2006	Kitt Peak	Spacewatch	AST	1.6 km	MPC; JPL
690592	2014 JA_{53}	—	October 24, 2003	Kitt Peak	Spacewatch	MAR	1.0 km	MPC; JPL
690593	2014 JC_{54}	—	April 28, 2014	Haleakala	Pan-STARRS 1	·	1.9 km	MPC; JPL
690594	2014 JM_{56}	—	April 17, 2009	Mount Lemmon	Mount Lemmon Survey	H	340 m	MPC; JPL
690595	2014 JS_{56}	—	May 8, 2014	Haleakala	Pan-STARRS 1	H	340 m	MPC; JPL
690596	2014 JB_{62}	—	May 7, 2014	Haleakala	Pan-STARRS 1	EOS	1.2 km	MPC; JPL
690597	2014 JC_{67}	—	July 21, 2006	Mount Lemmon	Mount Lemmon Survey	·	1.5 km	MPC; JPL
690598	2014 JQ_{70}	—	April 30, 2014	Haleakala	Pan-STARRS 1	·	550 m	MPC; JPL
690599	2014 JT_{71}	—	April 30, 2014	Haleakala	Pan-STARRS 1	·	470 m	MPC; JPL
690600	2014 JY_{71}	—	May 8, 2014	Haleakala	Pan-STARRS 1	·	610 m	MPC; JPL

== 690601–690700 ==
back to top

Designation			Discovery			Properties		Ref
Permanent	Provisional	Named after	Date	Site	Discoverer(s)	Category	Diam.	Ref
690601	2014 JE_{72}	—	February 3, 2013	Haleakala	Pan-STARRS 1	·	1.7 km	MPC; JPL
690602	2014 JY_{75}	—	April 30, 2014	Haleakala	Pan-STARRS 1	·	500 m	MPC; JPL
690603	2014 JH_{82}	—	May 3, 2014	Mount Lemmon	Mount Lemmon Survey	·	1.2 km	MPC; JPL
690604	2014 JJ_{84}	—	February 14, 2013	Haleakala	Pan-STARRS 1	·	2.0 km	MPC; JPL
690605	2014 JY_{84}	—	May 9, 2014	Haleakala	Pan-STARRS 1	·	1.6 km	MPC; JPL
690606	2014 JA_{86}	—	May 9, 2014	Haleakala	Pan-STARRS 1	KOR	1.2 km	MPC; JPL
690607	2014 JB_{86}	—	March 29, 2008	Kitt Peak	Spacewatch	·	2.2 km	MPC; JPL
690608	2014 JF_{86}	—	May 2, 2014	Mount Lemmon	Mount Lemmon Survey	EOS	1.2 km	MPC; JPL
690609	2014 JH_{86}	—	September 30, 2010	Mount Lemmon	Mount Lemmon Survey	·	1.4 km	MPC; JPL
690610	2014 JL_{88}	—	May 4, 2014	Haleakala	Pan-STARRS 1	·	1.7 km	MPC; JPL
690611	2014 JP_{88}	—	August 9, 2005	Cerro Tololo	Deep Ecliptic Survey	·	1.5 km	MPC; JPL
690612	2014 JH_{90}	—	May 8, 2014	Haleakala	Pan-STARRS 1	·	1.2 km	MPC; JPL
690613	2014 JM_{94}	—	May 9, 2014	Haleakala	Pan-STARRS 1	·	1.8 km	MPC; JPL
690614	2014 JT_{102}	—	October 29, 2005	Kitt Peak	Spacewatch	·	500 m	MPC; JPL
690615	2014 JA_{103}	—	May 6, 2014	Haleakala	Pan-STARRS 1	·	1.3 km	MPC; JPL
690616	2014 JP_{105}	—	May 1, 2014	Mount Lemmon	Mount Lemmon Survey	MAS	540 m	MPC; JPL
690617	2014 JQ_{105}	—	May 7, 2014	Haleakala	Pan-STARRS 1	EOS	1.4 km	MPC; JPL
690618	2014 JU_{105}	—	May 7, 2014	Haleakala	Pan-STARRS 1	EOS	1.4 km	MPC; JPL
690619	2014 JS_{106}	—	May 5, 2014	Mount Lemmon	Mount Lemmon Survey	·	1.3 km	MPC; JPL
690620	2014 JF_{107}	—	May 7, 2014	Haleakala	Pan-STARRS 1	EOS	1.2 km	MPC; JPL
690621	2014 JT_{107}	—	May 7, 2014	Haleakala	Pan-STARRS 1	·	1.1 km	MPC; JPL
690622	2014 JF_{109}	—	May 6, 2014	Haleakala	Pan-STARRS 1	·	1.9 km	MPC; JPL
690623	2014 JJ_{109}	—	May 7, 2014	Haleakala	Pan-STARRS 1	·	530 m	MPC; JPL
690624	2014 JX_{110}	—	May 5, 2014	Mount Lemmon	Mount Lemmon Survey	·	590 m	MPC; JPL
690625	2014 JO_{111}	—	May 8, 2014	Haleakala	Pan-STARRS 1	·	1.4 km	MPC; JPL
690626	2014 JY_{111}	—	May 8, 2014	Haleakala	Pan-STARRS 1	KOR	1.1 km	MPC; JPL
690627	2014 JZ_{111}	—	May 8, 2014	Haleakala	Pan-STARRS 1	KOR	1.1 km	MPC; JPL
690628	2014 JN_{112}	—	May 7, 2014	Haleakala	Pan-STARRS 1	·	1.6 km	MPC; JPL
690629	2014 JL_{113}	—	May 6, 2014	Mount Lemmon	Mount Lemmon Survey	HNS	920 m	MPC; JPL
690630	2014 JM_{113}	—	May 8, 2014	Haleakala	Pan-STARRS 1	·	1.3 km	MPC; JPL
690631	2014 JN_{113}	—	May 7, 2014	Haleakala	Pan-STARRS 1	·	2.1 km	MPC; JPL
690632	2014 JG_{115}	—	May 8, 2014	Haleakala	Pan-STARRS 1	AST	1.3 km	MPC; JPL
690633	2014 JL_{117}	—	May 6, 2014	Haleakala	Pan-STARRS 1	EOS	1.3 km	MPC; JPL
690634	2014 JD_{121}	—	January 10, 2013	Haleakala	Pan-STARRS 1	·	1.7 km	MPC; JPL
690635	2014 JV_{121}	—	May 9, 2014	Haleakala	Pan-STARRS 1	V	500 m	MPC; JPL
690636	2014 JD_{122}	—	May 4, 2014	Haleakala	Pan-STARRS 1	·	1.4 km	MPC; JPL
690637	2014 JB_{123}	—	May 6, 2014	Haleakala	Pan-STARRS 1	·	610 m	MPC; JPL
690638	2014 JD_{123}	—	May 2, 2014	Mount Lemmon	Mount Lemmon Survey	·	580 m	MPC; JPL
690639	2014 JS_{126}	—	May 8, 2014	Haleakala	Pan-STARRS 1	·	2.0 km	MPC; JPL
690640	2014 JX_{126}	—	May 9, 2014	Haleakala	Pan-STARRS 1	·	2.0 km	MPC; JPL
690641	2014 JD_{127}	—	May 8, 2014	Haleakala	Pan-STARRS 1	·	1.8 km	MPC; JPL
690642	2014 JF_{127}	—	May 4, 2014	Haleakala	Pan-STARRS 1	·	1.3 km	MPC; JPL
690643	2014 JJ_{127}	—	May 7, 2014	Haleakala	Pan-STARRS 1	EOS	1.5 km	MPC; JPL
690644	2014 JG_{128}	—	May 4, 2014	Haleakala	Pan-STARRS 1	·	530 m	MPC; JPL
690645	2014 JN_{147}	—	May 4, 2014	Haleakala	Pan-STARRS 1	·	1.8 km	MPC; JPL
690646	2014 JZ_{147}	—	May 3, 2014	Kitt Peak	Spacewatch	·	2.4 km	MPC; JPL
690647	2014 JJ_{149}	—	May 3, 2014	Mount Lemmon	Mount Lemmon Survey	·	560 m	MPC; JPL
690648	2014 JP_{150}	—	May 3, 2014	Mount Lemmon	Mount Lemmon Survey	KOR	1.0 km	MPC; JPL
690649	2014 KD_{4}	—	January 11, 2011	Kitt Peak	Spacewatch	H	370 m	MPC; JPL
690650	2014 KW_{5}	—	August 14, 2010	Kitt Peak	Spacewatch	·	1.4 km	MPC; JPL
690651	2014 KJ_{10}	—	May 21, 2014	Kitt Peak	Spacewatch	·	500 m	MPC; JPL
690652	2014 KT_{11}	—	May 21, 2014	Haleakala	Pan-STARRS 1	·	1.3 km	MPC; JPL
690653	2014 KJ_{12}	—	October 2, 2006	Mount Lemmon	Mount Lemmon Survey	KOR	1.2 km	MPC; JPL
690654	2014 KK_{12}	—	November 1, 2011	Mount Lemmon	Mount Lemmon Survey	·	1.6 km	MPC; JPL
690655	2014 KY_{13}	—	April 23, 2007	Kitt Peak	Spacewatch	·	640 m	MPC; JPL
690656	2014 KB_{16}	—	May 8, 2014	Haleakala	Pan-STARRS 1	·	1.5 km	MPC; JPL
690657	2014 KM_{17}	—	May 21, 2014	Mount Lemmon	Mount Lemmon Survey	EOS	1.4 km	MPC; JPL
690658	2014 KJ_{19}	—	February 2, 2005	Kitt Peak	Spacewatch	·	1.0 km	MPC; JPL
690659	2014 KQ_{20}	—	February 13, 2013	Haleakala	Pan-STARRS 1	·	2.1 km	MPC; JPL
690660	2014 KT_{24}	—	January 30, 2000	Kitt Peak	Spacewatch	·	630 m	MPC; JPL
690661	2014 KZ_{26}	—	December 23, 2012	Haleakala	Pan-STARRS 1	·	1.6 km	MPC; JPL
690662	2014 KX_{29}	—	May 8, 2014	Haleakala	Pan-STARRS 1	·	2.1 km	MPC; JPL
690663	2014 KM_{30}	—	September 19, 1998	Apache Point	SDSS	·	1.3 km	MPC; JPL
690664	2014 KT_{31}	—	October 1, 2010	Mount Lemmon	Mount Lemmon Survey	·	1.3 km	MPC; JPL
690665	2014 KJ_{32}	—	May 22, 2014	Mount Lemmon	Mount Lemmon Survey	·	1.6 km	MPC; JPL
690666	2014 KS_{32}	—	May 22, 2014	Mount Lemmon	Mount Lemmon Survey	·	570 m	MPC; JPL
690667	2014 KD_{36}	—	August 14, 2006	Siding Spring	SSS	ADE	1.9 km	MPC; JPL
690668	2014 KH_{36}	—	September 5, 2007	Mauna Kea	D. D. Balam, K. M. Perrett	EUN	1.3 km	MPC; JPL
690669	2014 KL_{37}	—	August 10, 2007	Kitt Peak	Spacewatch	EUN	1.1 km	MPC; JPL
690670	2014 KX_{37}	—	April 8, 2014	Haleakala	Pan-STARRS 1	BRA	1.4 km	MPC; JPL
690671	2014 KL_{39}	—	December 7, 2012	Haleakala	Pan-STARRS 1	H	400 m	MPC; JPL
690672	2014 KH_{43}	—	May 7, 2014	Haleakala	Pan-STARRS 1	·	1.3 km	MPC; JPL
690673	2014 KA_{50}	—	October 22, 2011	Kitt Peak	Spacewatch	KOR	1.2 km	MPC; JPL
690674	2014 KQ_{53}	—	February 16, 2010	Mount Lemmon	Mount Lemmon Survey	·	530 m	MPC; JPL
690675	2014 KY_{56}	—	March 11, 2007	Kitt Peak	Spacewatch	·	550 m	MPC; JPL
690676	2014 KD_{58}	—	January 18, 2009	Kitt Peak	Spacewatch	·	1.1 km	MPC; JPL
690677	2014 KY_{58}	—	May 6, 2014	Haleakala	Pan-STARRS 1	·	570 m	MPC; JPL
690678	2014 KN_{63}	—	November 14, 2007	Kitt Peak	Spacewatch	·	1.4 km	MPC; JPL
690679	2014 KJ_{64}	—	May 21, 2014	Haleakala	Pan-STARRS 1	·	1.5 km	MPC; JPL
690680	2014 KO_{66}	—	May 21, 2014	Haleakala	Pan-STARRS 1	·	1.6 km	MPC; JPL
690681	2014 KR_{67}	—	May 7, 2014	Haleakala	Pan-STARRS 1	·	590 m	MPC; JPL
690682	2014 KV_{68}	—	May 23, 2014	Haleakala	Pan-STARRS 1	·	1.6 km	MPC; JPL
690683	2014 KD_{69}	—	May 7, 2014	Haleakala	Pan-STARRS 1	·	1.6 km	MPC; JPL
690684	2014 KZ_{69}	—	May 23, 2014	Haleakala	Pan-STARRS 1	·	1.7 km	MPC; JPL
690685	2014 KP_{73}	—	May 24, 2014	Mount Lemmon	Mount Lemmon Survey	V	380 m	MPC; JPL
690686	2014 KX_{77}	—	January 16, 2013	Haleakala	Pan-STARRS 1	·	1.4 km	MPC; JPL
690687	2014 KS_{81}	—	May 27, 2014	Haleakala	Pan-STARRS 1	GAL	1.4 km	MPC; JPL
690688	2014 KC_{89}	—	May 9, 2014	Haleakala	Pan-STARRS 1	·	2.3 km	MPC; JPL
690689	2014 KX_{89}	—	May 7, 2014	Haleakala	Pan-STARRS 1	·	2.7 km	MPC; JPL
690690	2014 KX_{90}	—	May 27, 2014	Haleakala	Pan-STARRS 1	·	1 km	MPC; JPL
690691	2014 KK_{91}	—	May 26, 2014	Haleakala	Pan-STARRS 1	·	2.5 km	MPC; JPL
690692	2014 KM_{91}	—	March 6, 2008	Mount Lemmon	Mount Lemmon Survey	EOS	1.5 km	MPC; JPL
690693	2014 KL_{93}	—	May 28, 2014	Mount Lemmon	Mount Lemmon Survey	·	1.5 km	MPC; JPL
690694	2014 KB_{95}	—	May 6, 2014	Haleakala	Pan-STARRS 1	·	540 m	MPC; JPL
690695	2014 KC_{95}	—	May 6, 2014	Haleakala	Pan-STARRS 1	·	2.2 km	MPC; JPL
690696	2014 KB_{96}	—	January 5, 2013	Kitt Peak	Spacewatch	·	1.2 km	MPC; JPL
690697	2014 KE_{96}	—	May 4, 2014	Mount Lemmon	Mount Lemmon Survey	·	1.3 km	MPC; JPL
690698	2014 KE_{97}	—	August 28, 2006	Kitt Peak	Spacewatch	·	1.5 km	MPC; JPL
690699	2014 KJ_{97}	—	May 24, 2014	Haleakala	Pan-STARRS 1	EOS	1.4 km	MPC; JPL
690700	2014 KN_{100}	—	May 28, 2014	Mount Lemmon	Mount Lemmon Survey	·	2.1 km	MPC; JPL

== 690701–690800 ==
back to top

Designation			Discovery			Properties		Ref
Permanent	Provisional	Named after	Date	Site	Discoverer(s)	Category	Diam.	Ref
690701	2014 KG_{101}	—	November 13, 2002	Kitt Peak	Spacewatch	·	2.3 km	MPC; JPL
690702	2014 KL_{101}	—	February 2, 2006	Mount Lemmon	Mount Lemmon Survey	NYS	1.1 km	MPC; JPL
690703	2014 KA_{102}	—	May 25, 2014	Haleakala	Pan-STARRS 1	SDO	205 km	MPC; JPL
690704	2014 KA_{103}	—	May 7, 2014	Haleakala	Pan-STARRS 1	·	1.9 km	MPC; JPL
690705	2014 KJ_{105}	—	April 28, 2008	Mount Lemmon	Mount Lemmon Survey	·	2.4 km	MPC; JPL
690706	2014 KN_{105}	—	October 26, 2011	Haleakala	Pan-STARRS 1	·	1.7 km	MPC; JPL
690707	2014 KO_{105}	—	May 22, 2014	Mount Lemmon	Mount Lemmon Survey	·	1.4 km	MPC; JPL
690708	2014 KP_{106}	—	October 22, 2006	Kitt Peak	Spacewatch	KOR	1.3 km	MPC; JPL
690709	2014 KG_{109}	—	May 23, 2014	Haleakala	Pan-STARRS 1	EOS	1.3 km	MPC; JPL
690710	2014 KX_{110}	—	May 25, 2014	Haleakala	Pan-STARRS 1	·	1.4 km	MPC; JPL
690711	2014 KE_{112}	—	May 28, 2014	Haleakala	Pan-STARRS 1	·	2.1 km	MPC; JPL
690712	2014 KO_{113}	—	May 23, 2014	Haleakala	Pan-STARRS 1	·	1.8 km	MPC; JPL
690713	2014 KZ_{113}	—	May 28, 2014	Haleakala	Pan-STARRS 1	EOS	1.7 km	MPC; JPL
690714	2014 KL_{114}	—	May 23, 2014	Haleakala	Pan-STARRS 1	·	2.2 km	MPC; JPL
690715	2014 KP_{120}	—	May 28, 2014	Mount Lemmon	Mount Lemmon Survey	·	1.9 km	MPC; JPL
690716	2014 KT_{120}	—	May 27, 2014	Haleakala	Pan-STARRS 1	·	2.5 km	MPC; JPL
690717	2014 KV_{120}	—	May 8, 2014	Haleakala	Pan-STARRS 1	·	1.5 km	MPC; JPL
690718	2014 KP_{124}	—	May 23, 2014	Haleakala	Pan-STARRS 1	EOS	1.4 km	MPC; JPL
690719	2014 KQ_{124}	—	May 7, 2014	Haleakala	Pan-STARRS 1	·	550 m	MPC; JPL
690720	2014 KN_{125}	—	May 20, 2014	Haleakala	Pan-STARRS 1	·	1.6 km	MPC; JPL
690721	2014 KV_{125}	—	May 24, 2014	Haleakala	Pan-STARRS 1	·	1.9 km	MPC; JPL
690722	2014 KG_{126}	—	May 27, 2014	Mount Lemmon	Mount Lemmon Survey	·	1.9 km	MPC; JPL
690723	2014 KM_{126}	—	May 24, 2014	Haleakala	Pan-STARRS 1	·	1.4 km	MPC; JPL
690724	2014 KW_{127}	—	May 26, 2014	Haleakala	Pan-STARRS 1	EOS	1.6 km	MPC; JPL
690725	2014 KO_{128}	—	May 23, 2014	Haleakala	Pan-STARRS 1	EOS	1.3 km	MPC; JPL
690726	2014 KX_{128}	—	May 20, 2014	Haleakala	Pan-STARRS 1	·	440 m	MPC; JPL
690727	2014 KY_{128}	—	May 7, 2014	Haleakala	Pan-STARRS 1	EOS	1.2 km	MPC; JPL
690728	2014 KZ_{129}	—	May 21, 2014	Haleakala	Pan-STARRS 1	·	1.6 km	MPC; JPL
690729	2014 KC_{130}	—	May 25, 2014	Haleakala	Pan-STARRS 1	·	740 m	MPC; JPL
690730	2014 KD_{130}	—	May 31, 2014	Haleakala	Pan-STARRS 1	URS	2.5 km	MPC; JPL
690731	2014 KC_{131}	—	May 28, 2014	Haleakala	Pan-STARRS 1	·	1.2 km	MPC; JPL
690732	2014 KJ_{132}	—	May 23, 2014	Haleakala	Pan-STARRS 1	·	2.4 km	MPC; JPL
690733	2014 KR_{132}	—	May 23, 2014	Haleakala	Pan-STARRS 1	EOS	1.3 km	MPC; JPL
690734	2014 KJ_{133}	—	May 20, 2014	Haleakala	Pan-STARRS 1	·	1.7 km	MPC; JPL
690735	2014 KQ_{136}	—	May 21, 2014	Haleakala	Pan-STARRS 1	·	700 m	MPC; JPL
690736	2014 KB_{138}	—	May 24, 2014	Haleakala	Pan-STARRS 1	·	1.9 km	MPC; JPL
690737	2014 KR_{138}	—	May 28, 2014	Haleakala	Pan-STARRS 1	EOS	1.3 km	MPC; JPL
690738	2014 KA_{140}	—	July 16, 2004	Cerro Tololo	Deep Ecliptic Survey	·	2.5 km	MPC; JPL
690739	2014 KB_{142}	—	May 21, 2014	Haleakala	Pan-STARRS 1	·	1.9 km	MPC; JPL
690740	2014 KH_{142}	—	May 24, 2014	Haleakala	Pan-STARRS 1	·	1.5 km	MPC; JPL
690741	2014 KQ_{142}	—	May 21, 2014	Haleakala	Pan-STARRS 1	EOS	1.5 km	MPC; JPL
690742	2014 KA_{143}	—	February 8, 2013	Haleakala	Pan-STARRS 1	·	1.5 km	MPC; JPL
690743	2014 KX_{145}	—	May 23, 2014	Haleakala	Pan-STARRS 1	·	1.4 km	MPC; JPL
690744	2014 KY_{145}	—	May 21, 2014	Haleakala	Pan-STARRS 1	EOS	1.0 km	MPC; JPL
690745	2014 KR_{147}	—	May 21, 2014	Haleakala	Pan-STARRS 1	KOR	1.1 km	MPC; JPL
690746	2014 KU_{147}	—	May 23, 2014	Haleakala	Pan-STARRS 1	EOS	1.3 km	MPC; JPL
690747	2014 KS_{157}	—	February 19, 2013	Kitt Peak	Spacewatch	·	2.4 km	MPC; JPL
690748	2014 KV_{157}	—	May 21, 2014	Haleakala	Pan-STARRS 1	·	2.3 km	MPC; JPL
690749	2014 KB_{158}	—	May 24, 2014	Haleakala	Pan-STARRS 1	·	1.9 km	MPC; JPL
690750	2014 KJ_{163}	—	May 23, 2014	Haleakala	Pan-STARRS 1	EOS	1.2 km	MPC; JPL
690751	2014 KH_{166}	—	April 4, 2008	Mount Lemmon	Mount Lemmon Survey	·	2.4 km	MPC; JPL
690752	2014 KN_{167}	—	May 28, 2014	Haleakala	Pan-STARRS 1	VER	1.8 km	MPC; JPL
690753	2014 KO_{167}	—	May 23, 2014	Haleakala	Pan-STARRS 1	·	2.1 km	MPC; JPL
690754	2014 KK_{168}	—	May 23, 2014	Haleakala	Pan-STARRS 1	EOS	1.5 km	MPC; JPL
690755	2014 LG_{2}	—	April 30, 2014	Haleakala	Pan-STARRS 1	·	1.6 km	MPC; JPL
690756	2014 LT_{2}	—	May 22, 2014	Haleakala	Pan-STARRS 1	EOS	1.4 km	MPC; JPL
690757	2014 LP_{3}	—	June 2, 2014	Mount Lemmon	Mount Lemmon Survey	·	1.5 km	MPC; JPL
690758	2014 LL_{6}	—	May 7, 2014	Haleakala	Pan-STARRS 1	·	1.4 km	MPC; JPL
690759	2014 LP_{6}	—	May 4, 2014	Mount Lemmon	Mount Lemmon Survey	·	1.4 km	MPC; JPL
690760	2014 LJ_{7}	—	May 2, 2014	Kitt Peak	Spacewatch	EOS	1.6 km	MPC; JPL
690761	2014 LK_{7}	—	May 7, 2014	Haleakala	Pan-STARRS 1	·	520 m	MPC; JPL
690762	2014 LJ_{8}	—	May 7, 2014	Haleakala	Pan-STARRS 1	EOS	1.3 km	MPC; JPL
690763	2014 LR_{8}	—	May 21, 2014	Mount Lemmon	Mount Lemmon Survey	·	560 m	MPC; JPL
690764	2014 LX_{13}	—	December 23, 2012	Haleakala	Pan-STARRS 1	PHO	790 m	MPC; JPL
690765	2014 LW_{15}	—	June 2, 2014	Mount Lemmon	Mount Lemmon Survey	·	2.6 km	MPC; JPL
690766	2014 LY_{15}	—	June 2, 2014	Haleakala	Pan-STARRS 1	·	3.3 km	MPC; JPL
690767	2014 LW_{18}	—	November 15, 2003	Kitt Peak	Spacewatch	·	1.5 km	MPC; JPL
690768	2014 LZ_{18}	—	October 19, 2003	Kitt Peak	Spacewatch	·	1.4 km	MPC; JPL
690769	2014 LE_{19}	—	January 19, 2004	Kitt Peak	Spacewatch	·	1.5 km	MPC; JPL
690770	2014 LQ_{19}	—	October 26, 2011	Haleakala	Pan-STARRS 1	·	1.6 km	MPC; JPL
690771	2014 LT_{20}	—	February 6, 2002	Kitt Peak	Deep Ecliptic Survey	·	1.1 km	MPC; JPL
690772	2014 LB_{22}	—	May 7, 2014	Haleakala	Pan-STARRS 1	·	2.0 km	MPC; JPL
690773	2014 LM_{30}	—	June 5, 2014	Haleakala	Pan-STARRS 1	·	2.6 km	MPC; JPL
690774	2014 LJ_{31}	—	April 13, 2013	Haleakala	Pan-STARRS 1	·	1.8 km	MPC; JPL
690775	2014 LC_{35}	—	October 8, 2015	Haleakala	Pan-STARRS 1	PHO	670 m	MPC; JPL
690776	2014 LO_{37}	—	June 2, 2014	Haleakala	Pan-STARRS 1	·	2.1 km	MPC; JPL
690777	2014 LP_{37}	—	June 3, 2014	Haleakala	Pan-STARRS 1	·	2.4 km	MPC; JPL
690778	2014 LB_{38}	—	June 3, 2014	Haleakala	Pan-STARRS 1	·	2.8 km	MPC; JPL
690779	2014 LC_{38}	—	June 3, 2014	Haleakala	Pan-STARRS 1	·	2.5 km	MPC; JPL
690780 Constantinescu	2014 LJ_{38}	Constantinescu	June 3, 2014	La Palma	EURONEAR	·	2.1 km	MPC; JPL
690781	2014 LZ_{38}	—	June 5, 2014	Haleakala	Pan-STARRS 1	·	2.1 km	MPC; JPL
690782	2014 LD_{40}	—	September 23, 2011	Kitt Peak	Spacewatch	·	620 m	MPC; JPL
690783	2014 LQ_{40}	—	June 4, 2014	Haleakala	Pan-STARRS 1	·	1.9 km	MPC; JPL
690784	2014 LR_{41}	—	June 2, 2014	Haleakala	Pan-STARRS 1	·	1.4 km	MPC; JPL
690785	2014 MT	—	February 2, 2008	Catalina	CSS	H	530 m	MPC; JPL
690786	2014 MW_{2}	—	June 20, 2014	Mount Lemmon	Mount Lemmon Survey	H	400 m	MPC; JPL
690787	2014 ME_{3}	—	May 26, 2014	Haleakala	Pan-STARRS 1	(194)	980 m	MPC; JPL
690788	2014 ML_{3}	—	May 2, 2014	Kitt Peak	Spacewatch	·	1.0 km	MPC; JPL
690789	2014 MX_{3}	—	October 23, 2004	Kitt Peak	Spacewatch	PHO	630 m	MPC; JPL
690790	2014 MN_{6}	—	May 28, 2014	Haleakala	Pan-STARRS 1	·	1.9 km	MPC; JPL
690791	2014 MW_{7}	—	May 25, 2014	Haleakala	Pan-STARRS 1	LIX	3.6 km	MPC; JPL
690792	2014 MD_{8}	—	June 20, 2014	Haleakala	Pan-STARRS 1	TIR	2.0 km	MPC; JPL
690793	2014 MM_{8}	—	June 20, 2014	Haleakala	Pan-STARRS 1	HNS	1.2 km	MPC; JPL
690794	2014 MB_{9}	—	May 25, 2014	Haleakala	Pan-STARRS 1	·	2.7 km	MPC; JPL
690795	2014 MM_{18}	—	June 24, 2014	Haleakala	Pan-STARRS 1	H	410 m	MPC; JPL
690796	2014 MR_{20}	—	June 22, 2014	Haleakala	Pan-STARRS 1	·	2.3 km	MPC; JPL
690797	2014 MM_{29}	—	May 21, 2014	Haleakala	Pan-STARRS 1	·	1.7 km	MPC; JPL
690798	2014 MR_{29}	—	October 26, 2011	Haleakala	Pan-STARRS 1	·	1.5 km	MPC; JPL
690799	2014 MS_{31}	—	March 15, 2012	Mount Lemmon	Mount Lemmon Survey	VER	2.4 km	MPC; JPL
690800	2014 MZ_{31}	—	June 20, 2014	Kitt Peak	Spacewatch	·	2.4 km	MPC; JPL

== 690801–690900 ==
back to top

Designation			Discovery			Properties		Ref
Permanent	Provisional	Named after	Date	Site	Discoverer(s)	Category	Diam.	Ref
690801	2014 MZ_{38}	—	May 23, 2014	Haleakala	Pan-STARRS 1	·	2.4 km	MPC; JPL
690802	2014 ML_{39}	—	August 18, 2009	Kitt Peak	Spacewatch	·	1.7 km	MPC; JPL
690803	2014 MU_{39}	—	April 30, 2003	Kitt Peak	Spacewatch	·	590 m	MPC; JPL
690804	2014 MG_{40}	—	November 26, 2010	Mount Lemmon	Mount Lemmon Survey	·	1.8 km	MPC; JPL
690805	2014 MW_{40}	—	May 7, 2014	Haleakala	Pan-STARRS 1	LUT	3.9 km	MPC; JPL
690806	2014 ML_{41}	—	June 27, 2014	Haleakala	Pan-STARRS 1	H	310 m	MPC; JPL
690807	2014 MZ_{45}	—	January 24, 2007	Kitt Peak	Spacewatch	·	1.7 km	MPC; JPL
690808	2014 MH_{46}	—	June 27, 2014	Haleakala	Pan-STARRS 1	·	2.1 km	MPC; JPL
690809	2014 MD_{47}	—	December 9, 2004	Kitt Peak	Spacewatch	·	2.3 km	MPC; JPL
690810	2014 MJ_{49}	—	June 29, 2014	Mount Lemmon	Mount Lemmon Survey	·	2.6 km	MPC; JPL
690811	2014 MF_{52}	—	February 28, 2008	Mount Lemmon	Mount Lemmon Survey	·	1.9 km	MPC; JPL
690812	2014 MB_{57}	—	June 27, 2014	Haleakala	Pan-STARRS 1	·	2.4 km	MPC; JPL
690813	2014 MG_{57}	—	April 17, 2013	Haleakala	Pan-STARRS 1	·	2.5 km	MPC; JPL
690814	2014 MW_{59}	—	June 30, 2014	Haleakala	Pan-STARRS 1	URS	2.9 km	MPC; JPL
690815	2014 MG_{60}	—	June 3, 2014	Haleakala	Pan-STARRS 1	H	420 m	MPC; JPL
690816	2014 MW_{61}	—	September 30, 2010	Mount Lemmon	Mount Lemmon Survey	·	1.4 km	MPC; JPL
690817	2014 ML_{62}	—	September 25, 2009	Mount Lemmon	Mount Lemmon Survey	·	2.6 km	MPC; JPL
690818	2014 MM_{66}	—	June 3, 2014	Haleakala	Pan-STARRS 1	EOS	1.8 km	MPC; JPL
690819	2014 MN_{66}	—	May 8, 2013	Haleakala	Pan-STARRS 1	·	2.2 km	MPC; JPL
690820	2014 MR_{66}	—	June 30, 2014	Haleakala	Pan-STARRS 1	·	2.7 km	MPC; JPL
690821	2014 MX_{69}	—	June 24, 2014	Haleakala	Pan-STARRS 1	centaur	166 km	MPC; JPL
690822	2014 MH_{70}	—	June 28, 2014	Haleakala	Pan-STARRS 1	plutino	324 km	MPC; JPL
690823	2014 MB_{72}	—	June 30, 2014	Haleakala	Pan-STARRS 1	·	2.3 km	MPC; JPL
690824	2014 MJ_{72}	—	April 2, 2013	Mount Lemmon	Mount Lemmon Survey	EOS	1.3 km	MPC; JPL
690825	2014 MN_{72}	—	October 1, 2009	Mount Lemmon	Mount Lemmon Survey	·	2.4 km	MPC; JPL
690826	2014 MX_{72}	—	June 24, 2014	Haleakala	Pan-STARRS 1	·	2.9 km	MPC; JPL
690827	2014 MR_{73}	—	March 7, 2007	Mount Lemmon	Mount Lemmon Survey	·	2.4 km	MPC; JPL
690828	2014 MU_{73}	—	June 30, 2014	Haleakala	Pan-STARRS 1	·	3.1 km	MPC; JPL
690829	2014 MM_{77}	—	March 20, 2013	Haleakala	Pan-STARRS 1	·	2.5 km	MPC; JPL
690830	2014 MN_{77}	—	March 13, 2013	Haleakala	Pan-STARRS 1	·	2.0 km	MPC; JPL
690831	2014 MR_{77}	—	August 10, 2009	Kitt Peak	Spacewatch	·	1.9 km	MPC; JPL
690832	2014 MM_{79}	—	June 30, 2014	Haleakala	Pan-STARRS 1	·	870 m	MPC; JPL
690833	2014 MM_{81}	—	June 29, 2014	Haleakala	Pan-STARRS 1	·	640 m	MPC; JPL
690834	2014 MC_{83}	—	October 15, 2015	Haleakala	Pan-STARRS 1	·	2.3 km	MPC; JPL
690835	2014 MY_{84}	—	June 23, 2014	Mount Lemmon	Mount Lemmon Survey	H	360 m	MPC; JPL
690836	2014 MY_{85}	—	June 24, 2014	Haleakala	Pan-STARRS 1	·	1.9 km	MPC; JPL
690837	2014 MJ_{89}	—	June 29, 2014	Mount Lemmon	Mount Lemmon Survey	·	2.5 km	MPC; JPL
690838	2014 MO_{89}	—	June 24, 2014	Haleakala	Pan-STARRS 1	·	2.9 km	MPC; JPL
690839	2014 MX_{89}	—	June 29, 2014	Haleakala	Pan-STARRS 1	VER	2.7 km	MPC; JPL
690840	2014 MZ_{89}	—	June 24, 2014	Haleakala	Pan-STARRS 1	·	2.5 km	MPC; JPL
690841	2014 MQ_{90}	—	June 24, 2014	Haleakala	Pan-STARRS 1	EOS	1.5 km	MPC; JPL
690842	2014 MU_{90}	—	June 24, 2014	Haleakala	Pan-STARRS 1	·	490 m	MPC; JPL
690843	2014 MF_{91}	—	June 29, 2014	Mount Lemmon	Mount Lemmon Survey	T_{j} (2.99)	2.8 km	MPC; JPL
690844	2014 MK_{91}	—	June 27, 2014	Haleakala	Pan-STARRS 1	EOS	1.3 km	MPC; JPL
690845	2014 MW_{91}	—	June 30, 2014	Haleakala	Pan-STARRS 1	·	2.5 km	MPC; JPL
690846	2014 MY_{91}	—	June 24, 2014	Haleakala	Pan-STARRS 1	EOS	1.4 km	MPC; JPL
690847	2014 MB_{92}	—	June 27, 2014	Haleakala	Pan-STARRS 1	·	2.2 km	MPC; JPL
690848	2014 MJ_{92}	—	June 24, 2014	Haleakala	Pan-STARRS 1	·	2.3 km	MPC; JPL
690849	2014 MV_{92}	—	June 24, 2014	Haleakala	Pan-STARRS 1	·	1.7 km	MPC; JPL
690850	2014 MH_{94}	—	June 28, 2014	Haleakala	Pan-STARRS 1	·	2.3 km	MPC; JPL
690851	2014 MY_{96}	—	June 20, 2014	Haleakala	Pan-STARRS 1	·	3.4 km	MPC; JPL
690852	2014 MT_{97}	—	March 13, 2013	Haleakala	Pan-STARRS 1	·	2.0 km	MPC; JPL
690853	2014 MQ_{98}	—	June 24, 2014	Mount Lemmon	Mount Lemmon Survey	·	480 m	MPC; JPL
690854	2014 MF_{99}	—	June 27, 2014	Haleakala	Pan-STARRS 1	·	2.0 km	MPC; JPL
690855	2014 MO_{99}	—	June 27, 2014	Haleakala	Pan-STARRS 1	·	2.4 km	MPC; JPL
690856	2014 MU_{99}	—	June 29, 2014	Haleakala	Pan-STARRS 1	EOS	1.4 km	MPC; JPL
690857	2014 MA_{103}	—	June 27, 2014	Haleakala	Pan-STARRS 1	·	2.3 km	MPC; JPL
690858	2014 NH	—	November 30, 2011	Mount Lemmon	Mount Lemmon Survey	·	2.0 km	MPC; JPL
690859	2014 NR_{4}	—	July 1, 2014	Haleakala	Pan-STARRS 1	·	1.8 km	MPC; JPL
690860	2014 NV_{4}	—	September 30, 2006	Catalina	CSS	·	1.5 km	MPC; JPL
690861	2014 NT_{5}	—	December 2, 2008	Kitt Peak	Spacewatch	·	840 m	MPC; JPL
690862	2014 NG_{7}	—	July 1, 2014	Haleakala	Pan-STARRS 1	·	2.3 km	MPC; JPL
690863	2014 NC_{8}	—	January 27, 2012	Kitt Peak	Spacewatch	·	2.4 km	MPC; JPL
690864	2014 NJ_{8}	—	June 23, 2014	Mount Lemmon	Mount Lemmon Survey	·	2.6 km	MPC; JPL
690865	2014 NW_{8}	—	December 30, 2005	Kitt Peak	Spacewatch	EOS	1.5 km	MPC; JPL
690866	2014 NY_{8}	—	October 7, 2004	Kitt Peak	Spacewatch	·	2.0 km	MPC; JPL
690867	2014 NP_{9}	—	December 3, 2010	Mount Lemmon	Mount Lemmon Survey	·	2.4 km	MPC; JPL
690868	2014 NV_{10}	—	January 10, 2008	Kitt Peak	Spacewatch	·	1.9 km	MPC; JPL
690869	2014 NX_{10}	—	July 1, 2014	Haleakala	Pan-STARRS 1	·	650 m	MPC; JPL
690870	2014 NE_{11}	—	July 1, 2014	Haleakala	Pan-STARRS 1	·	2.2 km	MPC; JPL
690871	2014 NG_{14}	—	July 1, 2014	Haleakala	Pan-STARRS 1	(43176)	2.6 km	MPC; JPL
690872	2014 NK_{14}	—	May 25, 2014	Haleakala	Pan-STARRS 1	EUP	3.6 km	MPC; JPL
690873	2014 NJ_{15}	—	June 4, 2014	Haleakala	Pan-STARRS 1	VER	2.1 km	MPC; JPL
690874	2014 NP_{15}	—	October 16, 2007	Kitt Peak	Spacewatch	·	810 m	MPC; JPL
690875	2014 NM_{16}	—	July 2, 2014	Mount Lemmon	Mount Lemmon Survey	·	2.6 km	MPC; JPL
690876	2014 NU_{18}	—	July 2, 2014	Mount Lemmon	Mount Lemmon Survey	·	2.1 km	MPC; JPL
690877	2014 NJ_{19}	—	May 28, 2008	Mount Lemmon	Mount Lemmon Survey	·	1.6 km	MPC; JPL
690878	2014 NY_{19}	—	June 3, 2014	Haleakala	Pan-STARRS 1	·	3.1 km	MPC; JPL
690879	2014 NM_{22}	—	November 25, 2005	Kitt Peak	Spacewatch	·	2.4 km	MPC; JPL
690880	2014 NC_{25}	—	July 2, 2014	Haleakala	Pan-STARRS 1	·	2.8 km	MPC; JPL
690881	2014 NM_{25}	—	July 2, 2014	Haleakala	Pan-STARRS 1	VER	2.2 km	MPC; JPL
690882	2014 NY_{25}	—	July 2, 2014	Haleakala	Pan-STARRS 1	·	2.6 km	MPC; JPL
690883	2014 NF_{26}	—	July 2, 2014	Haleakala	Pan-STARRS 1	·	580 m	MPC; JPL
690884	2014 NV_{27}	—	June 19, 2007	Kitt Peak	Spacewatch	·	620 m	MPC; JPL
690885	2014 NE_{28}	—	July 2, 2014	Haleakala	Pan-STARRS 1	·	2.0 km	MPC; JPL
690886	2014 ND_{29}	—	June 2, 2014	Haleakala	Pan-STARRS 1	·	2.3 km	MPC; JPL
690887	2014 NW_{29}	—	April 17, 2009	Mount Lemmon	Mount Lemmon Survey	·	1.3 km	MPC; JPL
690888	2014 NS_{30}	—	July 2, 2014	Haleakala	Pan-STARRS 1	·	2.6 km	MPC; JPL
690889	2014 NX_{31}	—	February 8, 2013	Haleakala	Pan-STARRS 1	·	870 m	MPC; JPL
690890	2014 NH_{32}	—	July 2, 2014	Haleakala	Pan-STARRS 1	·	2.1 km	MPC; JPL
690891	2014 NV_{32}	—	October 23, 2006	Kitt Peak	Spacewatch	MRX	1.1 km	MPC; JPL
690892	2014 NN_{33}	—	June 2, 2014	Haleakala	Pan-STARRS 1	·	2.7 km	MPC; JPL
690893	2014 NZ_{35}	—	July 2, 2014	Haleakala	Pan-STARRS 1	·	1.9 km	MPC; JPL
690894	2014 NJ_{36}	—	April 19, 2013	Haleakala	Pan-STARRS 1	·	3.0 km	MPC; JPL
690895	2014 NK_{36}	—	July 2, 2014	Haleakala	Pan-STARRS 1	·	2.2 km	MPC; JPL
690896	2014 NU_{41}	—	June 1, 2014	Haleakala	Pan-STARRS 1	·	2.5 km	MPC; JPL
690897	2014 NN_{43}	—	May 16, 2013	Mount Lemmon	Mount Lemmon Survey	·	3.0 km	MPC; JPL
690898	2014 NU_{43}	—	June 3, 2014	Haleakala	Pan-STARRS 1	JUN	690 m	MPC; JPL
690899	2014 NG_{47}	—	November 2, 2010	Kitt Peak	Spacewatch	ARM	3.7 km	MPC; JPL
690900	2014 NX_{47}	—	June 20, 2014	Kitt Peak	Spacewatch	·	2.5 km	MPC; JPL

== 690901–691000 ==
back to top

Designation			Discovery			Properties		Ref
Permanent	Provisional	Named after	Date	Site	Discoverer(s)	Category	Diam.	Ref
690901	2014 NV_{49}	—	July 3, 2014	Haleakala	Pan-STARRS 1	URS	2.6 km	MPC; JPL
690902	2014 NY_{50}	—	April 16, 2013	Cerro Tololo	DECam	·	1.3 km	MPC; JPL
690903	2014 NU_{51}	—	July 6, 2014	Haleakala	Pan-STARRS 1	·	1.2 km	MPC; JPL
690904	2014 NA_{57}	—	June 28, 2014	Haleakala	Pan-STARRS 1	·	2.6 km	MPC; JPL
690905	2014 NZ_{57}	—	July 6, 2014	Haleakala	Pan-STARRS 1	·	2.3 km	MPC; JPL
690906	2014 NF_{58}	—	January 27, 2011	Mount Lemmon	Mount Lemmon Survey	·	2.4 km	MPC; JPL
690907	2014 NF_{59}	—	July 6, 2014	Haleakala	Pan-STARRS 1	EUN	910 m	MPC; JPL
690908	2014 NG_{61}	—	July 7, 2014	Haleakala	Pan-STARRS 1	·	2.4 km	MPC; JPL
690909	2014 NA_{68}	—	February 25, 2007	Mount Lemmon	Mount Lemmon Survey	·	2.2 km	MPC; JPL
690910	2014 ND_{68}	—	July 8, 2014	Haleakala	Pan-STARRS 1	·	2.3 km	MPC; JPL
690911	2014 NL_{68}	—	July 7, 2014	Haleakala	Pan-STARRS 1	·	2.2 km	MPC; JPL
690912	2014 NO_{68}	—	July 3, 2014	Haleakala	Pan-STARRS 1	·	1.9 km	MPC; JPL
690913	2014 NP_{68}	—	March 25, 2009	Mount Lemmon	Mount Lemmon Survey	·	1.1 km	MPC; JPL
690914	2014 NA_{69}	—	July 7, 2014	Haleakala	Pan-STARRS 1	·	2.4 km	MPC; JPL
690915	2014 NC_{69}	—	July 10, 2014	Haleakala	Pan-STARRS 1	·	2.1 km	MPC; JPL
690916	2014 NE_{69}	—	June 2, 2014	Mount Lemmon	Mount Lemmon Survey	HYG	2.1 km	MPC; JPL
690917	2014 NF_{69}	—	July 7, 2014	Haleakala	Pan-STARRS 1	·	2.6 km	MPC; JPL
690918	2014 NU_{69}	—	November 8, 2010	Mount Lemmon	Mount Lemmon Survey	·	3.6 km	MPC; JPL
690919	2014 NF_{70}	—	April 12, 2013	Haleakala	Pan-STARRS 1	·	2.4 km	MPC; JPL
690920	2014 NQ_{70}	—	July 3, 2014	Haleakala	Pan-STARRS 1	·	2.8 km	MPC; JPL
690921	2014 NK_{71}	—	July 7, 2014	Haleakala	Pan-STARRS 1	EUP	3.2 km	MPC; JPL
690922	2014 NW_{72}	—	February 3, 2012	Mount Lemmon	Mount Lemmon Survey	HYG	2.3 km	MPC; JPL
690923 Predatu	2014 NB_{73}	Predatu	July 10, 2014	La Palma	EURONEAR	·	2.8 km	MPC; JPL
690924	2014 NF_{73}	—	December 13, 2006	Mount Lemmon	Mount Lemmon Survey	HOF	2.1 km	MPC; JPL
690925	2014 NM_{73}	—	July 8, 2014	Haleakala	Pan-STARRS 1	·	880 m	MPC; JPL
690926	2014 NS_{73}	—	July 3, 2014	Haleakala	Pan-STARRS 1	·	2.8 km	MPC; JPL
690927	2014 NX_{73}	—	September 12, 2015	Haleakala	Pan-STARRS 1	URS	2.6 km	MPC; JPL
690928	2014 NT_{76}	—	October 19, 2015	Haleakala	Pan-STARRS 1	·	2.4 km	MPC; JPL
690929	2014 NA_{80}	—	July 4, 2014	Haleakala	Pan-STARRS 1	·	940 m	MPC; JPL
690930	2014 NA_{81}	—	July 4, 2014	Haleakala	Pan-STARRS 1	·	2.1 km	MPC; JPL
690931	2014 NK_{81}	—	July 2, 2014	Haleakala	Pan-STARRS 1	·	2.2 km	MPC; JPL
690932	2014 NP_{81}	—	July 4, 2014	Haleakala	Pan-STARRS 1	·	2.3 km	MPC; JPL
690933	2014 NQ_{81}	—	July 1, 2014	Haleakala	Pan-STARRS 1	·	2.4 km	MPC; JPL
690934	2014 NX_{81}	—	July 8, 2014	Haleakala	Pan-STARRS 1	·	2.6 km	MPC; JPL
690935	2014 NQ_{82}	—	July 1, 2014	Haleakala	Pan-STARRS 1	·	2.2 km	MPC; JPL
690936	2014 NB_{83}	—	July 8, 2014	Haleakala	Pan-STARRS 1	VER	2.3 km	MPC; JPL
690937	2014 NF_{83}	—	November 15, 2009	Catalina	CSS	TIR	2.8 km	MPC; JPL
690938	2014 NJ_{83}	—	July 3, 2014	Haleakala	Pan-STARRS 1	·	2.7 km	MPC; JPL
690939	2014 NQ_{83}	—	July 1, 2014	Haleakala	Pan-STARRS 1	·	2.0 km	MPC; JPL
690940	2014 NT_{83}	—	July 1, 2014	Haleakala	Pan-STARRS 1	·	2.4 km	MPC; JPL
690941	2014 NU_{83}	—	July 2, 2014	Haleakala	Pan-STARRS 1	EOS	1.3 km	MPC; JPL
690942	2014 NQ_{84}	—	July 1, 2014	Haleakala	Pan-STARRS 1	·	2.5 km	MPC; JPL
690943	2014 NT_{84}	—	July 1, 2014	Haleakala	Pan-STARRS 1	DOR	2.0 km	MPC; JPL
690944	2014 NT_{89}	—	July 10, 2014	Haleakala	Pan-STARRS 1	·	1.7 km	MPC; JPL
690945	2014 NL_{90}	—	July 1, 2014	Haleakala	Pan-STARRS 1	·	1.1 km	MPC; JPL
690946	2014 NM_{90}	—	July 1, 2014	Haleakala	Pan-STARRS 1	·	1.9 km	MPC; JPL
690947	2014 NK_{91}	—	July 6, 2014	Haleakala	Pan-STARRS 1	·	2.4 km	MPC; JPL
690948	2014 NX_{91}	—	July 8, 2014	Haleakala	Pan-STARRS 1	T_{j} (2.99)	3.2 km	MPC; JPL
690949	2014 NC_{92}	—	July 4, 2014	Haleakala	Pan-STARRS 1	·	2.3 km	MPC; JPL
690950	2014 NW_{92}	—	July 1, 2014	Mount Lemmon	Mount Lemmon Survey	H	360 m	MPC; JPL
690951	2014 NC_{93}	—	July 3, 2014	Haleakala	Pan-STARRS 1	·	2.1 km	MPC; JPL
690952	2014 OR	—	June 30, 2014	Haleakala	Pan-STARRS 1	·	750 m	MPC; JPL
690953	2014 OL_{1}	—	June 25, 2014	Mount Lemmon	Mount Lemmon Survey	·	1.8 km	MPC; JPL
690954	2014 OR_{1}	—	October 27, 2009	Mount Lemmon	Mount Lemmon Survey	·	2.5 km	MPC; JPL
690955	2014 OG_{2}	—	January 12, 2011	Kitt Peak	Spacewatch	·	3.2 km	MPC; JPL
690956	2014 OT_{4}	—	January 27, 2012	Mount Lemmon	Mount Lemmon Survey	·	1.4 km	MPC; JPL
690957	2014 OV_{4}	—	June 5, 2014	Haleakala	Pan-STARRS 1	·	520 m	MPC; JPL
690958	2014 OX_{6}	—	July 24, 2014	Tivoli	G. Lehmann, ~Knöfel, A.	·	750 m	MPC; JPL
690959	2014 OA_{7}	—	February 23, 2012	Mount Lemmon	Mount Lemmon Survey	·	2.2 km	MPC; JPL
690960	2014 OD_{8}	—	June 25, 2014	Mount Lemmon	Mount Lemmon Survey	TIR	2.4 km	MPC; JPL
690961	2014 OV_{8}	—	September 11, 2010	Kitt Peak	Spacewatch	HOF	2.2 km	MPC; JPL
690962	2014 OD_{9}	—	September 23, 2005	Kitt Peak	Spacewatch	·	1.4 km	MPC; JPL
690963	2014 OC_{10}	—	July 25, 2014	Haleakala	Pan-STARRS 1	·	490 m	MPC; JPL
690964	2014 OS_{10}	—	June 25, 2014	Mount Lemmon	Mount Lemmon Survey	·	550 m	MPC; JPL
690965	2014 ON_{13}	—	July 25, 2014	Haleakala	Pan-STARRS 1	·	1.8 km	MPC; JPL
690966	2014 OV_{13}	—	June 26, 2014	Haleakala	Pan-STARRS 1	TIR	2.4 km	MPC; JPL
690967	2014 OD_{14}	—	July 7, 2005	Kitt Peak	Spacewatch	·	1.7 km	MPC; JPL
690968	2014 OW_{14}	—	July 25, 2014	Haleakala	Pan-STARRS 1	·	1.5 km	MPC; JPL
690969	2014 OG_{15}	—	April 10, 2013	Haleakala	Pan-STARRS 1	NEM	1.7 km	MPC; JPL
690970	2014 OK_{16}	—	July 2, 2014	Haleakala	Pan-STARRS 1	GEF	810 m	MPC; JPL
690971	2014 OY_{16}	—	July 25, 2014	Haleakala	Pan-STARRS 1	·	2.4 km	MPC; JPL
690972	2014 OB_{19}	—	November 7, 2005	Mauna Kea	A. Boattini	·	2.6 km	MPC; JPL
690973	2014 OR_{19}	—	April 3, 2008	Mount Lemmon	Mount Lemmon Survey	·	1.5 km	MPC; JPL
690974	2014 OT_{25}	—	July 25, 2014	Haleakala	Pan-STARRS 1	·	640 m	MPC; JPL
690975	2014 OF_{27}	—	July 25, 2014	Haleakala	Pan-STARRS 1	EOS	1.5 km	MPC; JPL
690976	2014 OC_{28}	—	June 27, 2014	Haleakala	Pan-STARRS 1	LIX	2.2 km	MPC; JPL
690977	2014 OK_{28}	—	August 18, 2009	Kitt Peak	Spacewatch	THM	1.8 km	MPC; JPL
690978	2014 OZ_{28}	—	August 29, 2006	Kitt Peak	Spacewatch	·	1.3 km	MPC; JPL
690979	2014 OE_{31}	—	September 11, 2007	Mount Lemmon	Mount Lemmon Survey	V	480 m	MPC; JPL
690980	2014 OK_{31}	—	February 15, 2012	Haleakala	Pan-STARRS 1	EOS	1.7 km	MPC; JPL
690981	2014 OE_{34}	—	December 29, 2005	Kitt Peak	Spacewatch	·	2.1 km	MPC; JPL
690982	2014 OO_{38}	—	July 25, 2014	Haleakala	Pan-STARRS 1	·	1.8 km	MPC; JPL
690983	2014 OU_{38}	—	September 28, 2009	Mount Lemmon	Mount Lemmon Survey	THM	1.7 km	MPC; JPL
690984	2014 OC_{39}	—	July 25, 2014	Haleakala	Pan-STARRS 1	·	1.9 km	MPC; JPL
690985	2014 ON_{39}	—	June 27, 2014	Haleakala	Pan-STARRS 1	·	1.9 km	MPC; JPL
690986	2014 OC_{46}	—	January 30, 2006	Kitt Peak	Spacewatch	·	2.3 km	MPC; JPL
690987	2014 OF_{47}	—	July 25, 2014	Haleakala	Pan-STARRS 1	·	2.0 km	MPC; JPL
690988	2014 OG_{50}	—	June 27, 2014	Haleakala	Pan-STARRS 1	·	2.4 km	MPC; JPL
690989	2014 OJ_{50}	—	February 9, 2008	Mount Lemmon	Mount Lemmon Survey	AGN	1.1 km	MPC; JPL
690990	2014 OJ_{51}	—	July 25, 2014	Haleakala	Pan-STARRS 1	·	1.9 km	MPC; JPL
690991	2014 OL_{55}	—	July 25, 2014	Haleakala	Pan-STARRS 1	·	2.5 km	MPC; JPL
690992	2014 OW_{56}	—	January 17, 2012	Bergisch Gladbach	W. Bickel	·	2.1 km	MPC; JPL
690993	2014 OZ_{59}	—	June 27, 2014	Haleakala	Pan-STARRS 1	V	410 m	MPC; JPL
690994	2014 OW_{60}	—	January 2, 2011	Mount Lemmon	Mount Lemmon Survey	·	2.2 km	MPC; JPL
690995	2014 OZ_{60}	—	November 13, 2010	Kitt Peak	Spacewatch	·	1.4 km	MPC; JPL
690996	2014 OA_{61}	—	July 25, 2014	Haleakala	Pan-STARRS 1	·	2.2 km	MPC; JPL
690997	2014 OM_{61}	—	July 25, 2014	Haleakala	Pan-STARRS 1	·	2.0 km	MPC; JPL
690998	2014 OZ_{61}	—	January 3, 2009	Mount Lemmon	Mount Lemmon Survey	PHO	820 m	MPC; JPL
690999	2014 OA_{62}	—	July 3, 2014	Haleakala	Pan-STARRS 1	·	2.1 km	MPC; JPL
691000	2014 OK_{62}	—	April 14, 2008	Mount Lemmon	Mount Lemmon Survey	·	1.8 km	MPC; JPL

back to top

== Meaning of names ==
As minor planet discoveries are confirmed, they are given a permanent number by the IAU's Minor Planet Center (MPC), and the discoverers can then submit names for them, following the IAU's naming conventions. The list below concerns those minor planets in the specified number-range that have received names, and explains the meanings of those names.

Official naming citations of newly named small Solar System bodies are approved and published in a bulletin by IAU's Working Group for Small Bodies Nomenclature (WGSBN). Before May 2021, citations were published in MPC's Minor Planet Circulars for many decades. Recent citations can also be found on the JPL Small-Body Database (SBDB). Until his death in 2016, German astronomer Lutz D. Schmadel compiled these citations into the Dictionary of Minor Planet Names (DMP) and regularly updated the collection.

Based on Paul Herget's The Names of the Minor Planets, Schmadel also researched the unclear origin of numerous asteroids, most of which had been named prior to World War II. This article incorporates text from this source, which is in the public domain: SBDB New namings may only be added to this list below after official publication as the preannouncement of names is condemned. The WGSBN publishes a comprehensive guideline for the naming rules of non-cometary small Solar System bodies.

Named minor planet	Provisional	This minor planet was named for...	Ref; Catalog
690780 Constantinescu	2014 LJ_{38}	Radu Dan Constantinescu (b. 1955), a Professor of Physics at the University of Craiova, Romania.	IAU · 690780
690923 Predatu	2014 NB_{73}	Marian Predatu (b. 1967), a Romanian astrophysicist.	IAU · 690923
