= List of minor planets: 648001–649000 =

The following is a partial list of minor planets, running from minor-planet number 648001 through 649000, inclusive. The primary data for this and other partial lists is based on JPL's "Small-Body Orbital Elements" and data available from the Minor Planet Center. Critical list information is also provided by the MPC, unless otherwise specified from Lowell Observatory. A detailed description of the table's columns and additional sources are given on the main page including a complete list of every page in this series, and a statistical break-up on the dynamical classification of minor planets.

Also see the summary list of all named bodies in numerical and alphabetical order, and the corresponding naming citations for the number range of this particular list. New namings may only be added to this list after official publication, as the preannouncement of names is condemned by the Working Group for Small Bodies Nomenclature of the International Astronomical Union.

Near-Earth obj.	MBA (inner)	MBA (outer)	Centaur
Mars-crosser	MBA (middle)	Jupiter trojan	Trans-Neptunian obj.
Unclassified

== 648001–648100 ==
Designation			Discovery			Properties		Ref
Permanent	Provisional	Named after	Date	Site	Discoverer(s)	Category	Diam.	Ref
648001	2009 CF_{4}	—	September 4, 2007	Mount Lemmon	Mount Lemmon Survey	·	1.0 km	MPC · JPL
648002	2009 CB_{7}	—	September 17, 2006	Kitt Peak	Spacewatch	EOS	1.8 km	MPC · JPL
648003	2009 CY_{8}	—	February 1, 2009	Mount Lemmon	Mount Lemmon Survey	EOS	1.5 km	MPC · JPL
648004	2009 CV_{12}	—	January 20, 2009	Mount Lemmon	Mount Lemmon Survey	·	870 m	MPC · JPL
648005	2009 CB_{13}	—	February 1, 2009	Mount Lemmon	Mount Lemmon Survey	·	1.2 km	MPC · JPL
648006	2009 CE_{15}	—	January 31, 2009	Kitt Peak	Spacewatch	·	720 m	MPC · JPL
648007	2009 CC_{18}	—	January 3, 2009	Mount Lemmon	Mount Lemmon Survey	·	1.3 km	MPC · JPL
648008	2009 CN_{24}	—	February 1, 2009	Kitt Peak	Spacewatch	·	1.7 km	MPC · JPL
648009	2009 CO_{25}	—	February 1, 2009	Kitt Peak	Spacewatch	·	860 m	MPC · JPL
648010	2009 CP_{31}	—	February 1, 2009	Kitt Peak	Spacewatch	·	2.2 km	MPC · JPL
648011	2009 CF_{32}	—	March 16, 2004	Kitt Peak	Spacewatch	·	1.7 km	MPC · JPL
648012	2009 CC_{49}	—	February 14, 2009	Mount Lemmon	Mount Lemmon Survey	·	2.1 km	MPC · JPL
648013	2009 CF_{49}	—	September 16, 2002	Palomar	NEAT	·	1.6 km	MPC · JPL
648014	2009 CX_{65}	—	August 19, 2006	Kitt Peak	Spacewatch	·	1.7 km	MPC · JPL
648015	2009 CY_{66}	—	February 3, 2009	Kitt Peak	Spacewatch	3:2	4.8 km	MPC · JPL
648016	2009 CE_{70}	—	December 29, 2008	Mount Lemmon	Mount Lemmon Survey	·	900 m	MPC · JPL
648017	2009 CH_{72}	—	January 18, 2009	Mount Lemmon	Mount Lemmon Survey	·	2.5 km	MPC · JPL
648018	2009 CY_{74}	—	February 1, 2009	Kitt Peak	Spacewatch	EOS	1.3 km	MPC · JPL
648019	2009 CS_{75}	—	February 5, 2009	Mount Lemmon	Mount Lemmon Survey	·	2.8 km	MPC · JPL
648020	2009 CT_{75}	—	February 4, 2009	Mount Lemmon	Mount Lemmon Survey	·	2.3 km	MPC · JPL
648021	2009 CS_{77}	—	February 2, 2009	Mount Lemmon	Mount Lemmon Survey	EOS	1.5 km	MPC · JPL
648022	2009 DY_{1}	—	January 25, 2009	Kitt Peak	Spacewatch	·	1.4 km	MPC · JPL
648023	2009 DH_{8}	—	September 28, 2001	Palomar	NEAT	·	2.5 km	MPC · JPL
648024	2009 DO_{17}	—	February 17, 2009	Kitt Peak	Spacewatch	H	500 m	MPC · JPL
648025	2009 DX_{17}	—	December 20, 2004	Mount Lemmon	Mount Lemmon Survey	NYS	930 m	MPC · JPL
648026	2009 DJ_{18}	—	May 9, 2002	Palomar	NEAT	NYS	1.3 km	MPC · JPL
648027	2009 DP_{18}	—	August 27, 2006	Kitt Peak	Spacewatch	·	2.7 km	MPC · JPL
648028	2009 DW_{27}	—	February 22, 2009	Calar Alto	F. Hormuth	·	2.1 km	MPC · JPL
648029	2009 DG_{30}	—	November 3, 2007	Mount Lemmon	Mount Lemmon Survey	·	1.3 km	MPC · JPL
648030	2009 DM_{38}	—	August 18, 2006	Kitt Peak	Spacewatch	EOS	1.4 km	MPC · JPL
648031	2009 DL_{48}	—	February 24, 2009	Catalina	CSS	·	3.2 km	MPC · JPL
648032	2009 DK_{54}	—	December 16, 2004	Kitt Peak	Spacewatch	·	900 m	MPC · JPL
648033	2009 DH_{55}	—	March 17, 2004	Kitt Peak	Spacewatch	·	2.2 km	MPC · JPL
648034	2009 DS_{60}	—	February 22, 2009	Kitt Peak	Spacewatch	·	1.3 km	MPC · JPL
648035	2009 DH_{65}	—	December 29, 2008	Mount Lemmon	Mount Lemmon Survey	·	2.4 km	MPC · JPL
648036	2009 DS_{69}	—	February 4, 2009	Kitt Peak	Spacewatch	MAS	680 m	MPC · JPL
648037	2009 DW_{75}	—	January 20, 2009	Kitt Peak	Spacewatch	EOS	1.6 km	MPC · JPL
648038	2009 DZ_{78}	—	January 15, 2007	Mauna Kea	P. A. Wiegert	·	2.4 km	MPC · JPL
648039	2009 DD_{87}	—	February 19, 2009	Kitt Peak	Spacewatch	·	820 m	MPC · JPL
648040	2009 DH_{93}	—	February 28, 2009	Mount Lemmon	Mount Lemmon Survey	·	1.4 km	MPC · JPL
648041	2009 DE_{101}	—	February 26, 2009	Kitt Peak	Spacewatch	·	1.4 km	MPC · JPL
648042	2009 DT_{101}	—	February 26, 2009	Kitt Peak	Spacewatch	·	1.4 km	MPC · JPL
648043	2009 DF_{107}	—	February 28, 2009	Kitt Peak	Spacewatch	NYS	830 m	MPC · JPL
648044	2009 DH_{107}	—	January 1, 2008	Kitt Peak	Spacewatch	3:2 · SHU	4.7 km	MPC · JPL
648045	2009 DK_{116}	—	October 9, 2007	Kitt Peak	Spacewatch	·	2.0 km	MPC · JPL
648046	2009 DA_{121}	—	February 27, 2009	Kitt Peak	Spacewatch	·	1.4 km	MPC · JPL
648047	2009 DM_{135}	—	February 26, 2009	Cerro Burek	Burek, Cerro	·	1.5 km	MPC · JPL
648048	2009 DX_{139}	—	February 2, 2005	Palomar	NEAT	·	3.0 km	MPC · JPL
648049	2009 DS_{142}	—	February 20, 2009	Kitt Peak	Spacewatch	·	640 m	MPC · JPL
648050	2009 DG_{146}	—	February 20, 2009	Kitt Peak	Spacewatch	·	700 m	MPC · JPL
648051	2009 DS_{153}	—	February 20, 2009	Mount Lemmon	Mount Lemmon Survey	·	2.9 km	MPC · JPL
648052	2009 DT_{153}	—	February 22, 2009	Kitt Peak	Spacewatch	·	2.8 km	MPC · JPL
648053	2009 DU_{153}	—	February 19, 2009	Kitt Peak	Spacewatch	·	2.7 km	MPC · JPL
648054	2009 DC_{154}	—	February 20, 2009	Kitt Peak	Spacewatch	·	2.9 km	MPC · JPL
648055	2009 DE_{154}	—	February 20, 2009	Kitt Peak	Spacewatch	·	1.7 km	MPC · JPL
648056	2009 DB_{156}	—	February 28, 2009	Mount Lemmon	Mount Lemmon Survey	·	1.3 km	MPC · JPL
648057	2009 DN_{156}	—	February 27, 2009	Mount Lemmon	Mount Lemmon Survey	·	1.2 km	MPC · JPL
648058	2009 DR_{162}	—	October 17, 2007	Mount Lemmon	Mount Lemmon Survey	·	1.3 km	MPC · JPL
648059	2009 EB_{2}	—	March 1, 2009	Kitt Peak	Spacewatch	·	2.7 km	MPC · JPL
648060	2009 ER_{2}	—	March 5, 2009	Cerro Burek	Burek, Cerro	·	2.6 km	MPC · JPL
648061	2009 EM_{5}	—	March 1, 2009	Mount Lemmon	Mount Lemmon Survey	·	1.2 km	MPC · JPL
648062	2009 EX_{5}	—	March 16, 2004	Kitt Peak	Spacewatch	·	1.6 km	MPC · JPL
648063	2009 EF_{6}	—	September 14, 2006	Catalina	CSS	EUP	2.9 km	MPC · JPL
648064	2009 EH_{7}	—	July 21, 2006	Mount Lemmon	Mount Lemmon Survey	·	3.2 km	MPC · JPL
648065	2009 EJ_{7}	—	March 2, 2009	Kitt Peak	Spacewatch	·	2.3 km	MPC · JPL
648066	2009 ES_{8}	—	March 2, 2009	Mount Lemmon	Mount Lemmon Survey	·	570 m	MPC · JPL
648067	2009 EO_{10}	—	February 19, 2009	Kitt Peak	Spacewatch	·	1.9 km	MPC · JPL
648068	2009 EU_{16}	—	March 15, 2009	Kitt Peak	Spacewatch	·	3.0 km	MPC · JPL
648069	2009 EO_{36}	—	May 18, 2015	Haleakala	Pan-STARRS 1	·	1.5 km	MPC · JPL
648070	2009 ER_{39}	—	March 6, 2009	Siding Spring	SSS	JUN	1.1 km	MPC · JPL
648071	2009 EN_{40}	—	March 3, 2009	Kitt Peak	Spacewatch	3:2	4.9 km	MPC · JPL
648072	2009 EA_{42}	—	March 2, 2009	Mount Lemmon	Mount Lemmon Survey	EOS	1.3 km	MPC · JPL
648073	2009 FX_{1}	—	March 17, 2009	Taunus	E. Schwab, R. Kling	·	2.2 km	MPC · JPL
648074	2009 FZ_{1}	—	February 19, 2009	Kitt Peak	Spacewatch	THM	2.0 km	MPC · JPL
648075	2009 FY_{7}	—	March 1, 2009	Kitt Peak	Spacewatch	·	1.7 km	MPC · JPL
648076	2009 FQ_{23}	—	March 15, 2009	Kitt Peak	Spacewatch	PHO	680 m	MPC · JPL
648077	2009 FH_{31}	—	December 31, 2008	Kitt Peak	Spacewatch	·	2.1 km	MPC · JPL
648078	2009 FJ_{35}	—	December 30, 2008	Mount Lemmon	Mount Lemmon Survey	·	1.7 km	MPC · JPL
648079	2009 FK_{35}	—	March 1, 2009	Kitt Peak	Spacewatch	·	2.4 km	MPC · JPL
648080	2009 FY_{41}	—	March 28, 2009	Kitt Peak	Spacewatch	EOS	1.8 km	MPC · JPL
648081	2009 FE_{44}	—	March 30, 2009	Bergisch Gladbach	W. Bickel	·	2.4 km	MPC · JPL
648082	2009 FP_{54}	—	March 17, 2009	Kitt Peak	Spacewatch	V	680 m	MPC · JPL
648083	2009 FE_{62}	—	March 21, 2009	Mount Lemmon	Mount Lemmon Survey	·	2.7 km	MPC · JPL
648084	2009 FG_{72}	—	March 18, 2009	Kitt Peak	Spacewatch	·	1.7 km	MPC · JPL
648085	2009 FC_{81}	—	December 8, 2012	Mount Lemmon	Mount Lemmon Survey	·	2.6 km	MPC · JPL
648086	2009 FB_{93}	—	March 26, 2009	Kitt Peak	Spacewatch	BAP	700 m	MPC · JPL
648087	2009 GQ_{3}	—	March 21, 2009	Kitt Peak	Spacewatch	·	3.1 km	MPC · JPL
648088	2009 GR_{4}	—	April 3, 2009	Cerro Burek	Burek, Cerro	·	1.1 km	MPC · JPL
648089	2009 GL_{8}	—	October 23, 1998	Kitt Peak	Spacewatch	·	1.1 km	MPC · JPL
648090	2009 HH_{12}	—	October 22, 2006	Kitt Peak	Spacewatch	·	2.6 km	MPC · JPL
648091	2009 HN_{15}	—	April 2, 2009	Mount Lemmon	Mount Lemmon Survey	·	2.4 km	MPC · JPL
648092	2009 HK_{18}	—	November 1, 2007	Mount Lemmon	Mount Lemmon Survey	·	900 m	MPC · JPL
648093	2009 HB_{22}	—	April 17, 2009	Kitt Peak	Spacewatch	·	1.6 km	MPC · JPL
648094	2009 HH_{24}	—	April 17, 2009	Kitt Peak	Spacewatch	·	1.9 km	MPC · JPL
648095	2009 HY_{24}	—	April 12, 2005	Kitt Peak	Spacewatch	·	1.0 km	MPC · JPL
648096	2009 HV_{25}	—	September 25, 2006	Mount Lemmon	Mount Lemmon Survey	·	980 m	MPC · JPL
648097	2009 HF_{27}	—	March 28, 2009	Kitt Peak	Spacewatch	·	2.5 km	MPC · JPL
648098	2009 HF_{29}	—	October 16, 2007	Mount Lemmon	Mount Lemmon Survey	·	1.4 km	MPC · JPL
648099	2009 HZ_{31}	—	April 19, 2009	Kitt Peak	Spacewatch	·	2.3 km	MPC · JPL
648100	2009 HR_{38}	—	April 18, 2009	Kitt Peak	Spacewatch	·	2.3 km	MPC · JPL

== 648101–648200 ==
back to top

Designation			Discovery			Properties		Ref
Permanent	Provisional	Named after	Date	Site	Discoverer(s)	Category	Diam.	Ref
648101	2009 HT_{39}	—	April 18, 2009	Kitt Peak	Spacewatch	·	2.7 km	MPC · JPL
648102	2009 HW_{43}	—	April 20, 2009	Kitt Peak	Spacewatch	·	2.5 km	MPC · JPL
648103	2009 HE_{48}	—	April 19, 2009	Kitt Peak	Spacewatch	·	2.0 km	MPC · JPL
648104	2009 HM_{54}	—	April 20, 2009	Kitt Peak	Spacewatch	·	1.4 km	MPC · JPL
648105	2009 HW_{56}	—	April 22, 2009	Kitt Peak	Spacewatch	HNS	1.1 km	MPC · JPL
648106	2009 HX_{60}	—	January 15, 2008	Mount Lemmon	Mount Lemmon Survey	·	2.5 km	MPC · JPL
648107	2009 HM_{63}	—	May 13, 2005	Mount Lemmon	Mount Lemmon Survey	(5)	1.1 km	MPC · JPL
648108	2009 HA_{84}	—	April 19, 2009	Kitt Peak	Spacewatch	·	2.2 km	MPC · JPL
648109	2009 HS_{84}	—	April 23, 2009	Kitt Peak	Spacewatch	·	3.5 km	MPC · JPL
648110	2009 HQ_{104}	—	April 29, 2009	Kitt Peak	Spacewatch	·	1.6 km	MPC · JPL
648111	2009 HD_{107}	—	April 27, 2009	Catalina	CSS	·	2.4 km	MPC · JPL
648112	2009 HY_{108}	—	April 22, 2009	Mount Lemmon	Mount Lemmon Survey	EOS	1.5 km	MPC · JPL
648113	2009 HA_{112}	—	April 19, 2009	Mount Lemmon	Mount Lemmon Survey	·	470 m	MPC · JPL
648114	2009 HC_{119}	—	August 14, 2016	Haleakala	Pan-STARRS 1	VER	2.2 km	MPC · JPL
648115	2009 HP_{121}	—	April 22, 2009	Mount Lemmon	Mount Lemmon Survey	THM	1.6 km	MPC · JPL
648116	2009 HN_{123}	—	April 17, 2009	Kitt Peak	Spacewatch	·	2.5 km	MPC · JPL
648117	2009 HO_{123}	—	April 27, 2009	Mount Lemmon	Mount Lemmon Survey	·	580 m	MPC · JPL
648118	2009 HD_{125}	—	April 23, 2009	Kitt Peak	Spacewatch	MAR	770 m	MPC · JPL
648119	2009 HS_{126}	—	April 20, 2009	Kitt Peak	Spacewatch	·	1.4 km	MPC · JPL
648120	2009 JF_{2}	—	March 11, 2005	Mount Lemmon	Mount Lemmon Survey	·	1.9 km	MPC · JPL
648121	2009 JG_{4}	—	April 29, 2008	Mount Lemmon	Mount Lemmon Survey	L5	8.8 km	MPC · JPL
648122	2009 JW_{5}	—	May 13, 2009	Kitt Peak	Spacewatch	H	420 m	MPC · JPL
648123	2009 JU_{7}	—	April 21, 2009	Kitt Peak	Spacewatch	·	1.0 km	MPC · JPL
648124	2009 JZ_{14}	—	May 1, 2009	Cerro Burek	Burek, Cerro	·	960 m	MPC · JPL
648125	2009 JT_{15}	—	April 18, 2009	Catalina	CSS	·	1.3 km	MPC · JPL
648126	2009 JT_{19}	—	August 4, 2001	Palomar	NEAT	·	1.8 km	MPC · JPL
648127	2009 JB_{22}	—	May 4, 2009	Mount Lemmon	Mount Lemmon Survey	·	2.1 km	MPC · JPL
648128	2009 KC	—	May 16, 2009	Wrightwood	J. W. Young	H	500 m	MPC · JPL
648129	2009 KQ_{2}	—	April 20, 2009	Kitt Peak	Spacewatch	·	970 m	MPC · JPL
648130	2009 KQ_{3}	—	May 17, 2009	Kitt Peak	Spacewatch	·	910 m	MPC · JPL
648131	2009 KG_{4}	—	May 24, 2009	La Sagra	OAM	·	660 m	MPC · JPL
648132	2009 KG_{6}	—	May 25, 2009	Kitt Peak	Spacewatch	·	3.2 km	MPC · JPL
648133	2009 KM_{11}	—	May 25, 2009	Kitt Peak	Spacewatch	·	1 km	MPC · JPL
648134	2009 KK_{16}	—	May 26, 2009	Kitt Peak	Spacewatch	·	2.9 km	MPC · JPL
648135	2009 KU_{17}	—	May 4, 2009	Kitt Peak	Spacewatch	MAR	790 m	MPC · JPL
648136	2009 KL_{26}	—	August 29, 2006	Kitt Peak	Spacewatch	·	560 m	MPC · JPL
648137	2009 KN_{35}	—	December 6, 2007	Mount Lemmon	Mount Lemmon Survey	·	1.2 km	MPC · JPL
648138	2009 LX_{7}	—	September 19, 1998	Apache Point	SDSS Collaboration	·	1.2 km	MPC · JPL
648139	2009 MB_{1}	—	June 15, 2009	Kitt Peak	Spacewatch	·	1.7 km	MPC · JPL
648140	2009 MP_{8}	—	December 13, 2007	Socorro	LINEAR	H	570 m	MPC · JPL
648141	2009 MO_{9}	—	June 22, 2009	Haleakala	Pan-STARRS 1	·	3.2 km	MPC · JPL
648142	2009 MU_{10}	—	January 9, 2013	Mount Lemmon	Mount Lemmon Survey	·	2.2 km	MPC · JPL
648143	2009 MP_{11}	—	February 6, 2011	La Sagra	OAM	H	560 m	MPC · JPL
648144	2009 OR_{2}	—	July 20, 2009	Zelenchukskaya	T. V. Krjačko, B. Satovski	·	670 m	MPC · JPL
648145	2009 OY_{2}	—	October 21, 2006	Kitt Peak	Spacewatch	·	630 m	MPC · JPL
648146	2009 OT_{3}	—	September 30, 2005	Anderson Mesa	LONEOS	·	1.4 km	MPC · JPL
648147	2009 OH_{8}	—	July 28, 2009	Plana	Fratev, F.	KON	2.1 km	MPC · JPL
648148	2009 OC_{12}	—	July 27, 2009	Kitt Peak	Spacewatch	·	3.0 km	MPC · JPL
648149	2009 OT_{12}	—	July 27, 2009	Kitt Peak	Spacewatch	EUN	1.4 km	MPC · JPL
648150	2009 OS_{14}	—	July 24, 2009	Cerro Burek	Burek, Cerro	·	570 m	MPC · JPL
648151	2009 OD_{15}	—	March 24, 2001	Kitt Peak	Spacewatch	·	2.7 km	MPC · JPL
648152	2009 OZ_{15}	—	August 26, 2005	Palomar	NEAT	·	1.5 km	MPC · JPL
648153	2009 OO_{18}	—	November 11, 2006	Catalina	CSS	·	660 m	MPC · JPL
648154	2009 OU_{18}	—	July 28, 2009	Kitt Peak	Spacewatch	·	2.9 km	MPC · JPL
648155	2009 OT_{23}	—	July 28, 2009	Kitt Peak	Spacewatch	HNS	980 m	MPC · JPL
648156	2009 OQ_{25}	—	July 28, 2009	Palomar	Palomar Transient Factory	BRG	1.2 km	MPC · JPL
648157	2009 OQ_{27}	—	August 10, 2016	Haleakala	Pan-STARRS 1	·	550 m	MPC · JPL
648158	2009 PO_{1}	—	June 23, 2009	Mount Lemmon	Mount Lemmon Survey	·	620 m	MPC · JPL
648159	2009 PF_{5}	—	October 27, 2006	Kitt Peak	Spacewatch	·	690 m	MPC · JPL
648160	2009 PE_{6}	—	January 7, 2006	Mount Lemmon	Mount Lemmon Survey	·	3.6 km	MPC · JPL
648161	2009 PZ_{14}	—	February 23, 2007	Mount Lemmon	Mount Lemmon Survey	GEF	1.2 km	MPC · JPL
648162	2009 PL_{21}	—	September 1, 2000	Saltsjobaden	A. Brandeker	·	1.8 km	MPC · JPL
648163	2009 PQ_{21}	—	August 15, 2009	Kitt Peak	Spacewatch	·	1.6 km	MPC · JPL
648164	2009 PD_{22}	—	August 15, 2009	Kitt Peak	Spacewatch	·	1.5 km	MPC · JPL
648165	2009 QL	—	April 15, 2008	Mount Lemmon	Mount Lemmon Survey	AEO	880 m	MPC · JPL
648166	2009 QY_{4}	—	August 16, 2009	La Sagra	OAM	·	640 m	MPC · JPL
648167	2009 QF_{10}	—	August 21, 2009	Dauban	C. Rinner, Kugel, F.	BRA	1.5 km	MPC · JPL
648168	2009 QH_{10}	—	August 21, 2009	Wildberg	R. Apitzsch	·	1.2 km	MPC · JPL
648169	2009 QM_{10}	—	September 1, 2005	Palomar	NEAT	MAR	1.1 km	MPC · JPL
648170	2009 QQ_{14}	—	August 16, 2009	Kitt Peak	Spacewatch	·	2.9 km	MPC · JPL
648171	2009 QP_{22}	—	August 20, 2009	La Sagra	OAM	·	650 m	MPC · JPL
648172	2009 QX_{24}	—	August 18, 2009	Kitt Peak	Spacewatch	·	690 m	MPC · JPL
648173	2009 QV_{27}	—	July 27, 2009	Catalina	CSS	·	1.6 km	MPC · JPL
648174	2009 QO_{30}	—	December 17, 2001	Palomar	NEAT	JUN	1.1 km	MPC · JPL
648175	2009 QT_{30}	—	August 22, 2009	Taunus	Karge, S., R. Kling	·	2.0 km	MPC · JPL
648176	2009 QT_{31}	—	September 6, 1999	Kitt Peak	Spacewatch	·	620 m	MPC · JPL
648177	2009 QN_{32}	—	April 11, 2008	Kitt Peak	Spacewatch	PAD	1.7 km	MPC · JPL
648178	2009 QS_{32}	—	March 9, 2007	Mount Lemmon	Mount Lemmon Survey	·	3.0 km	MPC · JPL
648179	2009 QU_{32}	—	August 16, 2009	Catalina	CSS	·	2.3 km	MPC · JPL
648180	2009 QD_{33}	—	August 20, 2009	Hibiscus	Teamo, N.	·	1.1 km	MPC · JPL
648181	2009 QO_{37}	—	March 10, 2005	Mount Lemmon	Mount Lemmon Survey	·	560 m	MPC · JPL
648182	2009 QU_{47}	—	August 28, 2009	La Sagra	OAM	·	3.5 km	MPC · JPL
648183	2009 QW_{49}	—	August 28, 2009	Kitt Peak	Spacewatch	·	1.3 km	MPC · JPL
648184	2009 QP_{51}	—	August 28, 2009	Kitt Peak	Spacewatch	THB	2.9 km	MPC · JPL
648185	2009 QL_{59}	—	September 19, 2009	Mount Lemmon	Mount Lemmon Survey	TIN	650 m	MPC · JPL
648186	2009 QQ_{61}	—	August 27, 2009	Catalina	CSS	·	660 m	MPC · JPL
648187	2009 QX_{63}	—	August 17, 2009	Kitt Peak	Spacewatch	JUN	850 m	MPC · JPL
648188	2009 QB_{65}	—	December 18, 2009	Mount Lemmon	Mount Lemmon Survey	EUN	1.2 km	MPC · JPL
648189	2009 QD_{65}	—	February 5, 2011	Haleakala	Pan-STARRS 1	PHO	930 m	MPC · JPL
648190	2009 QA_{66}	—	August 16, 2009	Kitt Peak	Spacewatch	·	1.6 km	MPC · JPL
648191	2009 QB_{72}	—	August 27, 2009	Catalina	CSS	·	1.5 km	MPC · JPL
648192	2009 QL_{72}	—	August 20, 2009	La Sagra	OAM	V	490 m	MPC · JPL
648193	2009 QX_{73}	—	August 18, 2009	Kitt Peak	Spacewatch	·	930 m	MPC · JPL
648194	2009 QY_{74}	—	August 29, 2009	Kitt Peak	Spacewatch	·	3.1 km	MPC · JPL
648195	2009 QN_{76}	—	August 27, 2009	Kitt Peak	Spacewatch	MAS	610 m	MPC · JPL
648196	2009 QD_{77}	—	August 23, 2009	Gaisberg	Gierlinger, R.	·	2.7 km	MPC · JPL
648197	2009 RA_{1}	—	August 27, 2009	Catalina	CSS	·	1.9 km	MPC · JPL
648198	2009 RB_{2}	—	September 10, 2009	Tenerife	ESA OGS	·	4.1 km	MPC · JPL
648199	2009 RV_{5}	—	September 15, 2009	Bisei	BATTeRS	·	1.3 km	MPC · JPL
648200	2009 RQ_{6}	—	August 29, 2009	Kitt Peak	Spacewatch	(5)	1.1 km	MPC · JPL

== 648201–648300 ==
back to top

Designation			Discovery			Properties		Ref
Permanent	Provisional	Named after	Date	Site	Discoverer(s)	Category	Diam.	Ref
648201	2009 RC_{13}	—	September 12, 2009	Kitt Peak	Spacewatch	AEO	1.0 km	MPC · JPL
648202	2009 RG_{13}	—	September 12, 2009	Kitt Peak	Spacewatch	·	580 m	MPC · JPL
648203	2009 RC_{22}	—	February 17, 2007	Mount Lemmon	Mount Lemmon Survey	·	4.6 km	MPC · JPL
648204	2009 RN_{23}	—	September 15, 2009	Mount Lemmon	Mount Lemmon Survey	(5)	1.2 km	MPC · JPL
648205	2009 RW_{26}	—	September 12, 2009	Kitt Peak	Spacewatch	(883)	570 m	MPC · JPL
648206	2009 RT_{28}	—	September 19, 2009	Kitt Peak	Spacewatch	·	570 m	MPC · JPL
648207	2009 RB_{29}	—	September 14, 2009	Kitt Peak	Spacewatch	·	610 m	MPC · JPL
648208	2009 RT_{29}	—	September 14, 2009	Kitt Peak	Spacewatch	·	1.4 km	MPC · JPL
648209	2009 RT_{31}	—	September 14, 2009	Kitt Peak	Spacewatch	·	590 m	MPC · JPL
648210	2009 RY_{35}	—	September 14, 2009	Kitt Peak	Spacewatch	L4	5.0 km	MPC · JPL
648211 Kamilhairullin	2009 RL_{38}	Kamilhairullin	August 30, 2009	Zelenchukskaya	T. V. Krjačko, B. Satovski	·	1.6 km	MPC · JPL
648212	2009 RV_{40}	—	September 15, 2009	Kitt Peak	Spacewatch	·	1.7 km	MPC · JPL
648213	2009 RZ_{41}	—	September 15, 2009	Kitt Peak	Spacewatch	·	1.2 km	MPC · JPL
648214	2009 RA_{42}	—	September 15, 2009	Kitt Peak	Spacewatch	·	710 m	MPC · JPL
648215	2009 RL_{42}	—	September 8, 2000	Kitt Peak	Spacewatch	ADE	1.6 km	MPC · JPL
648216	2009 RM_{45}	—	September 15, 2009	Kitt Peak	Spacewatch	·	960 m	MPC · JPL
648217	2009 RY_{47}	—	November 19, 2001	Kitt Peak	Deep Lens Survey	·	1.5 km	MPC · JPL
648218	2009 RN_{50}	—	September 15, 2009	Kitt Peak	Spacewatch	·	1.8 km	MPC · JPL
648219	2009 RE_{51}	—	September 6, 2008	Mount Lemmon	Mount Lemmon Survey	L4	5.6 km	MPC · JPL
648220	2009 RJ_{57}	—	September 14, 2009	Catalina	CSS	·	1.5 km	MPC · JPL
648221	2009 RC_{59}	—	September 15, 2009	Kitt Peak	Spacewatch	ADE	1.7 km	MPC · JPL
648222	2009 RA_{64}	—	September 15, 2009	Kitt Peak	Spacewatch	L4	6.7 km	MPC · JPL
648223	2009 RG_{64}	—	September 15, 2009	Kitt Peak	Spacewatch	L4	6.2 km	MPC · JPL
648224	2009 RY_{66}	—	September 15, 2009	Mount Lemmon	Mount Lemmon Survey	H	410 m	MPC · JPL
648225	2009 RL_{69}	—	August 28, 2009	La Sagra	OAM	·	780 m	MPC · JPL
648226	2009 RD_{75}	—	September 14, 2009	Catalina	CSS	·	1.8 km	MPC · JPL
648227	2009 RL_{76}	—	February 7, 2011	Mount Lemmon	Mount Lemmon Survey	ADE	1.8 km	MPC · JPL
648228	2009 RM_{78}	—	June 1, 2012	Mount Lemmon	Mount Lemmon Survey	·	510 m	MPC · JPL
648229	2009 RF_{80}	—	September 15, 2009	Kitt Peak	Spacewatch	L4	7.7 km	MPC · JPL
648230	2009 RH_{80}	—	September 30, 2003	Kitt Peak	Spacewatch	(1118)	2.8 km	MPC · JPL
648231	2009 RE_{82}	—	September 15, 2009	Kitt Peak	Spacewatch	L4	5.5 km	MPC · JPL
648232	2009 RU_{82}	—	September 15, 2009	Kitt Peak	Spacewatch	L4	7.4 km	MPC · JPL
648233	2009 RC_{83}	—	September 14, 2009	Kitt Peak	Spacewatch	ADE	1.4 km	MPC · JPL
648234	2009 RN_{83}	—	September 15, 2009	Kitt Peak	Spacewatch	L4	5.6 km	MPC · JPL
648235	2009 RR_{83}	—	September 12, 2009	Kitt Peak	Spacewatch	·	540 m	MPC · JPL
648236	2009 SW_{2}	—	September 16, 2009	Kitt Peak	Spacewatch	·	500 m	MPC · JPL
648237	2009 SY_{6}	—	September 16, 2009	Mount Lemmon	Mount Lemmon Survey	·	1.6 km	MPC · JPL
648238	2009 ST_{7}	—	October 27, 2006	Mount Lemmon	Mount Lemmon Survey	·	610 m	MPC · JPL
648239	2009 SN_{13}	—	September 16, 2009	Mount Lemmon	Mount Lemmon Survey	·	1.4 km	MPC · JPL
648240	2009 SR_{15}	—	November 14, 2006	Kitt Peak	Spacewatch	·	490 m	MPC · JPL
648241	2009 SS_{21}	—	September 22, 2009	Bergisch Gladbach	W. Bickel	·	2.0 km	MPC · JPL
648242	2009 SC_{28}	—	September 16, 2009	Kitt Peak	Spacewatch	·	560 m	MPC · JPL
648243	2009 SA_{29}	—	September 16, 2009	Kitt Peak	Spacewatch	·	1.4 km	MPC · JPL
648244	2009 SL_{29}	—	March 29, 2008	Kitt Peak	Spacewatch	·	1.7 km	MPC · JPL
648245	2009 SC_{33}	—	September 16, 2009	Kitt Peak	Spacewatch	MRX	770 m	MPC · JPL
648246	2009 SH_{38}	—	September 16, 2009	Kitt Peak	Spacewatch	·	1.4 km	MPC · JPL
648247	2009 SF_{45}	—	September 16, 2009	Kitt Peak	Spacewatch	·	1.4 km	MPC · JPL
648248	2009 ST_{45}	—	May 2, 2008	Catalina	CSS	·	740 m	MPC · JPL
648249	2009 SK_{46}	—	September 18, 2003	Kitt Peak	Spacewatch	·	4.3 km	MPC · JPL
648250	2009 SA_{49}	—	September 16, 2009	Mount Lemmon	Mount Lemmon Survey	·	1.8 km	MPC · JPL
648251	2009 SK_{50}	—	August 17, 2009	Catalina	CSS	·	1.7 km	MPC · JPL
648252	2009 SX_{50}	—	September 17, 2009	Kitt Peak	Spacewatch	·	550 m	MPC · JPL
648253	2009 SA_{53}	—	September 17, 2009	Catalina	CSS	·	730 m	MPC · JPL
648254	2009 SQ_{54}	—	September 17, 2009	Mount Lemmon	Mount Lemmon Survey	·	1.4 km	MPC · JPL
648255	2009 SU_{57}	—	September 17, 2009	Kitt Peak	Spacewatch	·	1.7 km	MPC · JPL
648256	2009 SY_{66}	—	September 6, 2008	Kitt Peak	Spacewatch	L4	7.1 km	MPC · JPL
648257	2009 SV_{75}	—	May 1, 2003	Kitt Peak	Spacewatch	WIT	790 m	MPC · JPL
648258	2009 SR_{81}	—	September 18, 2009	Mount Lemmon	Mount Lemmon Survey	·	1.1 km	MPC · JPL
648259	2009 SQ_{83}	—	January 10, 2007	Mount Lemmon	Mount Lemmon Survey	·	1.4 km	MPC · JPL
648260	2009 SR_{85}	—	August 20, 2009	La Sagra	OAM	·	1.7 km	MPC · JPL
648261	2009 SE_{87}	—	September 18, 2009	Mount Lemmon	Mount Lemmon Survey	·	540 m	MPC · JPL
648262	2009 SK_{88}	—	August 15, 2009	Kitt Peak	Spacewatch	·	700 m	MPC · JPL
648263	2009 SS_{93}	—	November 16, 2006	Mount Lemmon	Mount Lemmon Survey	·	550 m	MPC · JPL
648264	2009 SC_{98}	—	September 20, 2009	Kitt Peak	Spacewatch	HOF	2.6 km	MPC · JPL
648265	2009 SR_{99}	—	September 23, 2009	Catalina	CSS	PHO	930 m	MPC · JPL
648266	2009 SL_{100}	—	September 17, 2009	Moletai	K. Černis, Zdanavicius, K.	EOS	2.3 km	MPC · JPL
648267	2009 SA_{110}	—	October 11, 2005	Kitt Peak	Spacewatch	·	940 m	MPC · JPL
648268	2009 SH_{115}	—	October 27, 2005	Mount Lemmon	Mount Lemmon Survey	·	1.4 km	MPC · JPL
648269	2009 SV_{116}	—	September 18, 2009	Kitt Peak	Spacewatch	·	490 m	MPC · JPL
648270	2009 SR_{119}	—	October 22, 2005	Kitt Peak	Spacewatch	·	1.1 km	MPC · JPL
648271	2009 SE_{121}	—	September 18, 2009	Kitt Peak	Spacewatch	L4	6.0 km	MPC · JPL
648272	2009 SX_{122}	—	March 10, 2007	Mount Lemmon	Mount Lemmon Survey	·	1.2 km	MPC · JPL
648273	2009 SA_{123}	—	September 18, 2009	Kitt Peak	Spacewatch	·	1.3 km	MPC · JPL
648274	2009 SP_{123}	—	September 18, 2009	Kitt Peak	Spacewatch	·	3.3 km	MPC · JPL
648275	2009 SN_{127}	—	September 18, 2009	Kitt Peak	Spacewatch	·	1.4 km	MPC · JPL
648276	2009 ST_{129}	—	September 18, 2009	Kitt Peak	Spacewatch	L4	7.0 km	MPC · JPL
648277	2009 SA_{132}	—	September 18, 2009	Kitt Peak	Spacewatch	·	1.4 km	MPC · JPL
648278	2009 SH_{132}	—	September 18, 2009	Kitt Peak	Spacewatch	·	670 m	MPC · JPL
648279	2009 SP_{135}	—	September 18, 2009	Kitt Peak	Spacewatch	·	1.5 km	MPC · JPL
648280	2009 SQ_{138}	—	April 7, 2007	Mount Lemmon	Mount Lemmon Survey	·	2.0 km	MPC · JPL
648281	2009 SQ_{141}	—	September 19, 2009	Kitt Peak	Spacewatch	·	1.3 km	MPC · JPL
648282	2009 SJ_{142}	—	September 19, 2009	Mount Lemmon	Mount Lemmon Survey	·	1.3 km	MPC · JPL
648283	2009 SF_{144}	—	September 19, 2009	Kitt Peak	Spacewatch	·	1.2 km	MPC · JPL
648284	2009 SG_{145}	—	August 28, 2009	Kitt Peak	Spacewatch	·	610 m	MPC · JPL
648285	2009 SH_{147}	—	September 19, 2009	Mount Lemmon	Mount Lemmon Survey	·	470 m	MPC · JPL
648286	2009 SJ_{147}	—	September 19, 2009	Mount Lemmon	Mount Lemmon Survey	·	600 m	MPC · JPL
648287	2009 SH_{150}	—	September 20, 2009	Kitt Peak	Spacewatch	·	550 m	MPC · JPL
648288	2009 SX_{150}	—	September 20, 2009	Kitt Peak	Spacewatch	AGN	970 m	MPC · JPL
648289	2009 SA_{154}	—	September 20, 2009	Kitt Peak	Spacewatch	ADE	1.5 km	MPC · JPL
648290	2009 SF_{161}	—	August 2, 2009	Siding Spring	SSS	·	1.3 km	MPC · JPL
648291	2009 SS_{162}	—	October 12, 2004	Moletai	K. Černis, Zdanavicius, J.	·	3.2 km	MPC · JPL
648292	2009 SM_{168}	—	September 20, 2009	Mount Lemmon	Mount Lemmon Survey	MRX	820 m	MPC · JPL
648293	2009 SK_{173}	—	September 18, 2009	Kitt Peak	Spacewatch	·	570 m	MPC · JPL
648294	2009 SQ_{174}	—	August 15, 2009	Kitt Peak	Spacewatch	·	750 m	MPC · JPL
648295	2009 SO_{178}	—	September 20, 2009	Mount Lemmon	Mount Lemmon Survey	·	3.1 km	MPC · JPL
648296	2009 SB_{179}	—	February 17, 2007	Kitt Peak	Spacewatch	EUN	1.0 km	MPC · JPL
648297	2009 SX_{179}	—	September 20, 2009	Mount Lemmon	Mount Lemmon Survey	·	1.5 km	MPC · JPL
648298	2009 SW_{181}	—	September 21, 2009	Mount Lemmon	Mount Lemmon Survey	·	640 m	MPC · JPL
648299	2009 SV_{184}	—	September 6, 2008	Mount Lemmon	Mount Lemmon Survey	L4	5.7 km	MPC · JPL
648300	2009 SM_{185}	—	September 21, 2009	Kitt Peak	Spacewatch	·	1.2 km	MPC · JPL

== 648301–648400 ==
back to top

Designation			Discovery			Properties		Ref
Permanent	Provisional	Named after	Date	Site	Discoverer(s)	Category	Diam.	Ref
648301	2009 SE_{188}	—	September 21, 2009	Kitt Peak	Spacewatch	L4	6.4 km	MPC · JPL
648302	2009 SK_{188}	—	December 27, 2006	Mount Lemmon	Mount Lemmon Survey	·	1.5 km	MPC · JPL
648303	2009 SQ_{190}	—	September 17, 2003	Kitt Peak	Spacewatch	·	3.4 km	MPC · JPL
648304	2009 SB_{192}	—	September 22, 2009	Kitt Peak	Spacewatch	·	700 m	MPC · JPL
648305	2009 SF_{193}	—	September 22, 2009	Kitt Peak	Spacewatch	·	1.5 km	MPC · JPL
648306	2009 SA_{194}	—	September 14, 2009	Kitt Peak	Spacewatch	MRX	840 m	MPC · JPL
648307	2009 SG_{194}	—	September 22, 2009	Kitt Peak	Spacewatch	H	620 m	MPC · JPL
648308	2009 SY_{196}	—	February 27, 2008	Mount Lemmon	Mount Lemmon Survey	·	740 m	MPC · JPL
648309	2009 SN_{197}	—	September 22, 2009	Kitt Peak	Spacewatch	·	1.6 km	MPC · JPL
648310	2009 SK_{198}	—	September 22, 2009	Kitt Peak	Spacewatch	·	1.5 km	MPC · JPL
648311	2009 SC_{200}	—	September 22, 2009	Kitt Peak	Spacewatch	WIT	980 m	MPC · JPL
648312	2009 ST_{202}	—	September 22, 2009	Kitt Peak	Spacewatch	·	1.5 km	MPC · JPL
648313	2009 SK_{203}	—	April 10, 2003	Kitt Peak	Spacewatch	·	2.0 km	MPC · JPL
648314	2009 SX_{203}	—	September 22, 2009	Kitt Peak	Spacewatch	·	660 m	MPC · JPL
648315	2009 SQ_{217}	—	February 10, 2007	Mount Lemmon	Mount Lemmon Survey	·	1.5 km	MPC · JPL
648316	2009 SO_{219}	—	September 24, 2009	Mount Lemmon	Mount Lemmon Survey	AEO	950 m	MPC · JPL
648317	2009 SA_{224}	—	February 13, 2008	Kitt Peak	Spacewatch	·	770 m	MPC · JPL
648318	2009 SL_{225}	—	August 17, 2009	Kitt Peak	Spacewatch	AEO	1.1 km	MPC · JPL
648319	2009 SX_{231}	—	November 1, 2005	Kitt Peak	Spacewatch	·	1.7 km	MPC · JPL
648320	2009 SR_{232}	—	February 25, 2007	Mount Lemmon	Mount Lemmon Survey	·	3.7 km	MPC · JPL
648321	2009 SZ_{232}	—	September 19, 2009	Catalina	CSS	·	1.5 km	MPC · JPL
648322	2009 SE_{233}	—	September 19, 2009	Catalina	CSS	·	770 m	MPC · JPL
648323	2009 SF_{234}	—	September 13, 2002	Palomar	NEAT	·	510 m	MPC · JPL
648324	2009 SU_{236}	—	September 16, 2009	Catalina	CSS	JUN	920 m	MPC · JPL
648325	2009 SN_{238}	—	September 16, 2009	Catalina	CSS	L4	8.3 km	MPC · JPL
648326	2009 SQ_{239}	—	October 31, 2005	Anderson Mesa	LONEOS	·	1.7 km	MPC · JPL
648327	2009 SH_{241}	—	September 18, 2009	Catalina	CSS	·	2.8 km	MPC · JPL
648328	2009 SP_{245}	—	August 17, 2009	Siding Spring	SSS	·	1.6 km	MPC · JPL
648329	2009 SA_{247}	—	September 18, 2009	Kitt Peak	Spacewatch	L4	6.1 km	MPC · JPL
648330	2009 SY_{247}	—	September 21, 2009	Mount Lemmon	Mount Lemmon Survey	L4	7.4 km	MPC · JPL
648331	2009 SF_{251}	—	September 20, 2009	Kitt Peak	Spacewatch	·	1.5 km	MPC · JPL
648332	2009 SA_{254}	—	September 18, 2009	Kitt Peak	Spacewatch	L4	8.0 km	MPC · JPL
648333	2009 SA_{263}	—	August 31, 2000	Kitt Peak	Spacewatch	526	1.9 km	MPC · JPL
648334	2009 SS_{268}	—	September 24, 2009	Kitt Peak	Spacewatch	NEM	1.6 km	MPC · JPL
648335	2009 SJ_{270}	—	September 24, 2009	Mount Lemmon	Mount Lemmon Survey	·	1.4 km	MPC · JPL
648336	2009 SH_{277}	—	September 25, 2009	Kitt Peak	Spacewatch	·	1.2 km	MPC · JPL
648337	2009 SL_{283}	—	March 16, 2007	Kitt Peak	Spacewatch	EUN	890 m	MPC · JPL
648338	2009 SE_{288}	—	September 25, 2009	Kitt Peak	Spacewatch	·	1.7 km	MPC · JPL
648339	2009 SN_{288}	—	September 16, 2009	Kitt Peak	Spacewatch	·	610 m	MPC · JPL
648340	2009 SW_{289}	—	September 25, 2009	Kitt Peak	Spacewatch	·	620 m	MPC · JPL
648341	2009 SK_{290}	—	September 21, 2009	Kitt Peak	Spacewatch	L4	7.9 km	MPC · JPL
648342	2009 SC_{299}	—	September 29, 2009	Mount Lemmon	Mount Lemmon Survey	V	560 m	MPC · JPL
648343	2009 SY_{307}	—	September 17, 2009	Kitt Peak	Spacewatch	·	1.1 km	MPC · JPL
648344	2009 SK_{310}	—	October 25, 2005	Mount Lemmon	Mount Lemmon Survey	·	1.4 km	MPC · JPL
648345	2009 SD_{313}	—	April 4, 2005	Mount Lemmon	Mount Lemmon Survey	·	610 m	MPC · JPL
648346	2009 SY_{313}	—	September 14, 2009	Kitt Peak	Spacewatch	·	540 m	MPC · JPL
648347	2009 SW_{320}	—	April 8, 2003	Kitt Peak	Spacewatch	HNS	1.0 km	MPC · JPL
648348	2009 SP_{321}	—	September 21, 2009	Kitt Peak	Spacewatch	L4	7.5 km	MPC · JPL
648349	2009 SA_{325}	—	September 25, 2009	Kitt Peak	Spacewatch	·	1.6 km	MPC · JPL
648350	2009 SA_{326}	—	September 27, 2009	Mount Lemmon	Mount Lemmon Survey	NEM	1.8 km	MPC · JPL
648351	2009 SH_{330}	—	August 18, 2009	Kitt Peak	Spacewatch	·	650 m	MPC · JPL
648352	2009 SR_{330}	—	December 4, 2005	Kitt Peak	Spacewatch	·	1.2 km	MPC · JPL
648353	2009 SF_{335}	—	September 19, 2009	Kitt Peak	Spacewatch	·	1.6 km	MPC · JPL
648354	2009 SA_{341}	—	September 23, 2009	Mount Lemmon	Mount Lemmon Survey	·	1.3 km	MPC · JPL
648355	2009 SL_{341}	—	September 25, 2009	Kitt Peak	Spacewatch	·	820 m	MPC · JPL
648356	2009 SA_{347}	—	September 26, 2009	Kitt Peak	Spacewatch	·	1.6 km	MPC · JPL
648357	2009 SC_{361}	—	September 15, 2009	Kitt Peak	Spacewatch	·	1.4 km	MPC · JPL
648358	2009 SH_{361}	—	September 29, 2009	Mount Lemmon	Mount Lemmon Survey	·	580 m	MPC · JPL
648359	2009 SX_{361}	—	April 5, 2008	Mount Lemmon	Mount Lemmon Survey	·	1.1 km	MPC · JPL
648360	2009 ST_{366}	—	September 19, 2009	Palomar	Palomar Transient Factory	JUN	850 m	MPC · JPL
648361	2009 SN_{367}	—	April 1, 2008	Kitt Peak	Spacewatch	·	1.5 km	MPC · JPL
648362	2009 SA_{370}	—	September 21, 2009	Mount Lemmon	Mount Lemmon Survey	L4	7.0 km	MPC · JPL
648363	2009 SV_{370}	—	December 27, 2006	Mount Lemmon	Mount Lemmon Survey	·	550 m	MPC · JPL
648364	2009 SE_{371}	—	September 29, 2009	Mount Lemmon	Mount Lemmon Survey	WIT	770 m	MPC · JPL
648365	2009 SH_{372}	—	September 29, 2009	Mount Lemmon	Mount Lemmon Survey	H	460 m	MPC · JPL
648366	2009 SR_{378}	—	December 31, 2013	Mount Lemmon	Mount Lemmon Survey	·	610 m	MPC · JPL
648367	2009 SH_{382}	—	September 23, 2009	Mount Lemmon	Mount Lemmon Survey	·	1.6 km	MPC · JPL
648368	2009 SQ_{383}	—	September 22, 2009	Kitt Peak	Spacewatch	NYS	850 m	MPC · JPL
648369	2009 SH_{384}	—	July 12, 2013	Haleakala	Pan-STARRS 1	·	1.7 km	MPC · JPL
648370	2009 SJ_{385}	—	September 20, 2014	Haleakala	Pan-STARRS 1	DOR	2.5 km	MPC · JPL
648371	2009 SA_{386}	—	July 13, 2013	Mount Lemmon	Mount Lemmon Survey	·	1.5 km	MPC · JPL
648372	2009 SD_{388}	—	February 7, 2011	Mount Lemmon	Mount Lemmon Survey	·	590 m	MPC · JPL
648373	2009 ST_{389}	—	March 10, 2011	Mount Lemmon	Mount Lemmon Survey	·	1.7 km	MPC · JPL
648374	2009 SX_{396}	—	September 19, 2009	Kitt Peak	Spacewatch	·	840 m	MPC · JPL
648375	2009 SE_{397}	—	September 30, 2009	Mount Lemmon	Mount Lemmon Survey	NEM	1.9 km	MPC · JPL
648376	2009 SC_{398}	—	September 20, 2009	Kitt Peak	Spacewatch	·	1.4 km	MPC · JPL
648377	2009 SV_{398}	—	September 27, 2009	Mount Lemmon	Mount Lemmon Survey	·	1.3 km	MPC · JPL
648378	2009 SF_{399}	—	September 22, 2009	Mount Lemmon	Mount Lemmon Survey	·	1.4 km	MPC · JPL
648379	2009 SY_{400}	—	September 17, 2009	Kitt Peak	Spacewatch	NYS	910 m	MPC · JPL
648380	2009 SQ_{401}	—	September 21, 2009	Kitt Peak	Spacewatch	·	1.3 km	MPC · JPL
648381	2009 SY_{401}	—	September 19, 2009	Kitt Peak	Spacewatch	·	1.2 km	MPC · JPL
648382	2009 SR_{402}	—	September 19, 2009	Kitt Peak	Spacewatch	·	1.1 km	MPC · JPL
648383	2009 SO_{404}	—	September 20, 2009	Kitt Peak	Spacewatch	L4	6.2 km	MPC · JPL
648384	2009 SL_{406}	—	September 17, 2009	Kitt Peak	Spacewatch	L4	6.6 km	MPC · JPL
648385	2009 SJ_{409}	—	September 28, 2009	Kitt Peak	Spacewatch	·	1.4 km	MPC · JPL
648386	2009 SA_{412}	—	September 17, 2009	Kitt Peak	Spacewatch	·	3.0 km	MPC · JPL
648387	2009 SD_{415}	—	September 21, 2009	Mount Lemmon	Mount Lemmon Survey	·	1.3 km	MPC · JPL
648388	2009 SH_{419}	—	September 21, 2009	Mount Lemmon	Mount Lemmon Survey	L4	6.3 km	MPC · JPL
648389	2009 SL_{419}	—	September 21, 2009	Mount Lemmon	Mount Lemmon Survey	L4	6.5 km	MPC · JPL
648390	2009 SW_{419}	—	April 6, 2002	Kitt Peak	Spacewatch	L4	6.5 km	MPC · JPL
648391	2009 SE_{422}	—	September 21, 2009	Mount Lemmon	Mount Lemmon Survey	·	1.6 km	MPC · JPL
648392	2009 SP_{424}	—	September 21, 2009	Kitt Peak	Spacewatch	·	500 m	MPC · JPL
648393	2009 SZ_{424}	—	September 29, 2009	Mount Lemmon	Mount Lemmon Survey	AGN	810 m	MPC · JPL
648394	2009 SU_{425}	—	September 16, 2009	Kitt Peak	Spacewatch	·	990 m	MPC · JPL
648395	2009 TQ_{2}	—	August 29, 2009	Kitt Peak	Spacewatch	·	4.2 km	MPC · JPL
648396	2009 TW_{11}	—	October 14, 2009	La Sagra	OAM	·	1.9 km	MPC · JPL
648397	2009 TV_{16}	—	October 12, 2009	Goodricke-Pigott	R. A. Tucker	·	830 m	MPC · JPL
648398	2009 TS_{19}	—	October 11, 2009	Mount Lemmon	Mount Lemmon Survey	·	590 m	MPC · JPL
648399	2009 TR_{24}	—	September 27, 2009	Kitt Peak	Spacewatch	·	1.1 km	MPC · JPL
648400	2009 TS_{30}	—	October 15, 2009	Mount Lemmon	Mount Lemmon Survey	·	1.7 km	MPC · JPL

== 648401–648500 ==
back to top

Designation			Discovery			Properties		Ref
Permanent	Provisional	Named after	Date	Site	Discoverer(s)	Category	Diam.	Ref
648401	2009 TT_{30}	—	October 15, 2009	Mount Lemmon	Mount Lemmon Survey	L4	8.1 km	MPC · JPL
648402	2009 TJ_{34}	—	September 27, 2009	Catalina	CSS	·	880 m	MPC · JPL
648403	2009 TN_{38}	—	November 10, 2005	Catalina	CSS	·	1.9 km	MPC · JPL
648404	2009 TP_{38}	—	September 25, 2009	Catalina	CSS	·	3.4 km	MPC · JPL
648405	2009 TO_{39}	—	August 13, 2002	Anderson Mesa	LONEOS	·	680 m	MPC · JPL
648406	2009 TY_{40}	—	October 15, 2009	La Sagra	OAM	·	1.5 km	MPC · JPL
648407	2009 TG_{44}	—	October 14, 2009	Kitt Peak	Spacewatch	AGN	860 m	MPC · JPL
648408	2009 TZ_{51}	—	January 23, 2014	Mount Lemmon	Mount Lemmon Survey	·	540 m	MPC · JPL
648409	2009 TD_{52}	—	February 10, 2014	Mount Lemmon	Mount Lemmon Survey	·	610 m	MPC · JPL
648410	2009 TG_{54}	—	October 14, 2009	Mount Lemmon	Mount Lemmon Survey	L4	7.5 km	MPC · JPL
648411	2009 UB_{6}	—	October 16, 2009	Mount Lemmon	Mount Lemmon Survey	·	2.9 km	MPC · JPL
648412	2009 UK_{6}	—	November 20, 2006	Kitt Peak	Spacewatch	·	650 m	MPC · JPL
648413	2009 UT_{6}	—	October 16, 2009	Mount Lemmon	Mount Lemmon Survey	·	1.1 km	MPC · JPL
648414	2009 UV_{6}	—	October 16, 2009	Mount Lemmon	Mount Lemmon Survey	·	1.3 km	MPC · JPL
648415	2009 UW_{8}	—	October 16, 2009	Mount Lemmon	Mount Lemmon Survey	L4	6.3 km	MPC · JPL
648416	2009 UB_{10}	—	October 16, 2009	Catalina	CSS	·	1.8 km	MPC · JPL
648417	2009 UP_{12}	—	September 17, 2009	Mount Lemmon	Mount Lemmon Survey	(260)	2.8 km	MPC · JPL
648418	2009 UH_{13}	—	October 18, 2009	Kitt Peak	Spacewatch	·	1.8 km	MPC · JPL
648419	2009 UZ_{23}	—	September 14, 2009	Kitt Peak	Spacewatch	·	1.3 km	MPC · JPL
648420	2009 UL_{26}	—	October 21, 2009	Catalina	CSS	EOS	2.3 km	MPC · JPL
648421	2009 US_{30}	—	October 18, 2009	Mount Lemmon	Mount Lemmon Survey	·	840 m	MPC · JPL
648422	2009 UZ_{30}	—	October 18, 2009	Mount Lemmon	Mount Lemmon Survey	NEM	1.8 km	MPC · JPL
648423	2009 UX_{31}	—	May 6, 2008	Mount Lemmon	Mount Lemmon Survey	·	700 m	MPC · JPL
648424	2009 UZ_{31}	—	October 18, 2009	Mount Lemmon	Mount Lemmon Survey	·	1.4 km	MPC · JPL
648425	2009 UK_{35}	—	September 21, 2009	Mount Lemmon	Mount Lemmon Survey	·	610 m	MPC · JPL
648426	2009 UK_{39}	—	October 22, 2009	Mount Lemmon	Mount Lemmon Survey	·	480 m	MPC · JPL
648427	2009 UB_{44}	—	October 18, 2009	Mount Lemmon	Mount Lemmon Survey	·	1.3 km	MPC · JPL
648428	2009 UF_{45}	—	October 18, 2009	Mount Lemmon	Mount Lemmon Survey	·	590 m	MPC · JPL
648429	2009 US_{46}	—	November 7, 2002	Kitt Peak	Deep Ecliptic Survey	·	770 m	MPC · JPL
648430	2009 UM_{56}	—	October 23, 2009	Mount Lemmon	Mount Lemmon Survey	L4	6.4 km	MPC · JPL
648431	2009 UO_{56}	—	October 23, 2009	Mount Lemmon	Mount Lemmon Survey	·	1.6 km	MPC · JPL
648432	2009 UA_{59}	—	April 19, 2007	Mount Lemmon	Mount Lemmon Survey	·	1.6 km	MPC · JPL
648433	2009 UQ_{59}	—	September 27, 2009	Mount Lemmon	Mount Lemmon Survey	EUN	1.1 km	MPC · JPL
648434	2009 UJ_{63}	—	October 17, 2009	Mount Lemmon	Mount Lemmon Survey	·	1.2 km	MPC · JPL
648435	2009 UV_{66}	—	September 29, 2009	Mount Lemmon	Mount Lemmon Survey	·	650 m	MPC · JPL
648436	2009 UV_{68}	—	September 30, 2005	Mount Lemmon	Mount Lemmon Survey	·	1.1 km	MPC · JPL
648437	2009 UN_{72}	—	September 28, 2009	Catalina	CSS	·	2.0 km	MPC · JPL
648438	2009 UN_{73}	—	March 31, 2008	Mount Lemmon	Mount Lemmon Survey	·	730 m	MPC · JPL
648439	2009 UP_{75}	—	September 22, 2009	Kitt Peak	Spacewatch	·	1.6 km	MPC · JPL
648440	2009 UZ_{76}	—	September 14, 2009	Kitt Peak	Spacewatch	·	540 m	MPC · JPL
648441	2009 UU_{79}	—	October 22, 2009	Mount Lemmon	Mount Lemmon Survey	·	560 m	MPC · JPL
648442	2009 UJ_{80}	—	September 19, 2009	Kitt Peak	Spacewatch	·	1.3 km	MPC · JPL
648443	2009 UJ_{84}	—	December 21, 2006	Kitt Peak	Spacewatch	·	600 m	MPC · JPL
648444	2009 UN_{89}	—	October 27, 2009	Bisei	BATTeRS	ADE	1.6 km	MPC · JPL
648445	2009 UW_{90}	—	October 16, 2009	Catalina	CSS	(18466)	2.2 km	MPC · JPL
648446	2009 UW_{95}	—	October 22, 2009	Mount Lemmon	Mount Lemmon Survey	·	570 m	MPC · JPL
648447	2009 UP_{98}	—	April 6, 2008	Kitt Peak	Spacewatch	·	660 m	MPC · JPL
648448	2009 UF_{100}	—	October 23, 2009	Mount Lemmon	Mount Lemmon Survey	L4	10 km	MPC · JPL
648449	2009 UH_{100}	—	October 23, 2009	Mount Lemmon	Mount Lemmon Survey	NEM	1.8 km	MPC · JPL
648450	2009 UP_{100}	—	October 23, 2009	Mount Lemmon	Mount Lemmon Survey	(5)	980 m	MPC · JPL
648451	2009 UP_{107}	—	October 22, 2009	Mount Lemmon	Mount Lemmon Survey	·	510 m	MPC · JPL
648452	2009 UR_{108}	—	October 23, 2009	Kitt Peak	Spacewatch	·	1.7 km	MPC · JPL
648453	2009 UK_{112}	—	September 5, 2000	Apache Point	SDSS Collaboration	·	1.6 km	MPC · JPL
648454	2009 UR_{113}	—	March 30, 2003	Kitt Peak	Deep Ecliptic Survey	HNS	1.2 km	MPC · JPL
648455	2009 UH_{114}	—	September 16, 2009	Kitt Peak	Spacewatch	NEM	1.6 km	MPC · JPL
648456	2009 UG_{120}	—	September 18, 2009	Kitt Peak	Spacewatch	·	550 m	MPC · JPL
648457	2009 UA_{125}	—	October 26, 2009	Mount Lemmon	Mount Lemmon Survey	·	1.3 km	MPC · JPL
648458	2009 UL_{126}	—	September 6, 2008	Kitt Peak	Spacewatch	L4	6.8 km	MPC · JPL
648459	2009 UP_{129}	—	October 12, 2009	Mount Lemmon	Mount Lemmon Survey	V	600 m	MPC · JPL
648460	2009 UC_{132}	—	October 16, 2009	Catalina	CSS	HNS	1.2 km	MPC · JPL
648461	2009 UM_{138}	—	April 6, 2008	Mount Lemmon	Mount Lemmon Survey	·	680 m	MPC · JPL
648462	2009 UZ_{142}	—	October 18, 2009	Mount Lemmon	Mount Lemmon Survey	·	3.8 km	MPC · JPL
648463	2009 UD_{144}	—	March 11, 2007	Mount Lemmon	Mount Lemmon Survey	·	1.7 km	MPC · JPL
648464	2009 UZ_{144}	—	October 16, 2009	Catalina	CSS	·	790 m	MPC · JPL
648465	2009 UB_{145}	—	September 3, 2002	Palomar	NEAT	·	710 m	MPC · JPL
648466	2009 UZ_{158}	—	October 30, 2005	Mount Lemmon	Mount Lemmon Survey	·	1.4 km	MPC · JPL
648467	2009 UD_{159}	—	September 18, 2009	Kitt Peak	Spacewatch	L4	6.5 km	MPC · JPL
648468	2009 UE_{159}	—	January 28, 2015	Haleakala	Pan-STARRS 1	L4	7.5 km	MPC · JPL
648469	2009 UX_{159}	—	October 18, 2009	Mount Lemmon	Mount Lemmon Survey	·	1.1 km	MPC · JPL
648470	2009 UY_{159}	—	November 16, 2006	Mount Lemmon	Mount Lemmon Survey	·	560 m	MPC · JPL
648471	2009 UD_{169}	—	November 26, 2014	Haleakala	Pan-STARRS 1	·	1.3 km	MPC · JPL
648472	2009 UV_{173}	—	October 18, 2009	Mount Lemmon	Mount Lemmon Survey	·	1.4 km	MPC · JPL
648473	2009 UA_{174}	—	October 16, 2009	Mount Lemmon	Mount Lemmon Survey	HNS	1.2 km	MPC · JPL
648474	2009 UC_{174}	—	October 24, 2009	Kitt Peak	Spacewatch	·	1.5 km	MPC · JPL
648475	2009 UT_{174}	—	October 25, 2009	Kitt Peak	Spacewatch	·	1.2 km	MPC · JPL
648476	2009 UY_{174}	—	October 16, 2009	Mount Lemmon	Mount Lemmon Survey	·	1.4 km	MPC · JPL
648477	2009 UY_{175}	—	October 23, 2009	Mount Lemmon	Mount Lemmon Survey	·	3.4 km	MPC · JPL
648478	2009 UJ_{177}	—	October 11, 2002	Palomar	NEAT	V	450 m	MPC · JPL
648479	2009 UN_{178}	—	October 26, 2009	Mount Lemmon	Mount Lemmon Survey	H	470 m	MPC · JPL
648480	2009 UU_{180}	—	October 22, 2009	Mount Lemmon	Mount Lemmon Survey	L4	6.6 km	MPC · JPL
648481	2009 UV_{184}	—	October 22, 2009	Mount Lemmon	Mount Lemmon Survey	BRA	1.4 km	MPC · JPL
648482	2009 UD_{185}	—	October 23, 2009	Mount Lemmon	Mount Lemmon Survey	HNS	1.1 km	MPC · JPL
648483	2009 UB_{187}	—	October 16, 2009	Mount Lemmon	Mount Lemmon Survey	·	1.1 km	MPC · JPL
648484	2009 UG_{189}	—	October 27, 2009	Mount Lemmon	Mount Lemmon Survey	L4	6.4 km	MPC · JPL
648485	2009 UT_{189}	—	October 24, 2009	Kitt Peak	Spacewatch	L4	5.6 km	MPC · JPL
648486	2009 VK_{4}	—	October 24, 2009	Kitt Peak	Spacewatch	L4	9.2 km	MPC · JPL
648487	2009 VT_{5}	—	November 8, 2009	Mount Lemmon	Mount Lemmon Survey	WIT	850 m	MPC · JPL
648488	2009 VW_{5}	—	November 8, 2009	Mount Lemmon	Mount Lemmon Survey	·	450 m	MPC · JPL
648489	2009 VF_{10}	—	November 8, 2009	Kitt Peak	Spacewatch	WIT	780 m	MPC · JPL
648490	2009 VP_{13}	—	March 26, 2008	Mount Lemmon	Mount Lemmon Survey	·	620 m	MPC · JPL
648491	2009 VD_{14}	—	September 29, 2008	Kitt Peak	Spacewatch	L4	6.2 km	MPC · JPL
648492	2009 VN_{14}	—	November 8, 2009	Mount Lemmon	Mount Lemmon Survey	·	1.4 km	MPC · JPL
648493	2009 VC_{24}	—	October 7, 2004	Kitt Peak	Spacewatch	·	1.9 km	MPC · JPL
648494	2009 VG_{29}	—	August 8, 2004	Palomar	NEAT	·	2.0 km	MPC · JPL
648495	2009 VO_{30}	—	November 9, 2009	Mount Lemmon	Mount Lemmon Survey	·	680 m	MPC · JPL
648496	2009 VA_{31}	—	November 9, 2009	Mount Lemmon	Mount Lemmon Survey	·	600 m	MPC · JPL
648497	2009 VC_{32}	—	January 28, 2007	Mount Lemmon	Mount Lemmon Survey	·	500 m	MPC · JPL
648498	2009 VE_{32}	—	September 22, 2009	Mount Lemmon	Mount Lemmon Survey	·	620 m	MPC · JPL
648499	2009 VX_{32}	—	November 9, 2009	Mount Lemmon	Mount Lemmon Survey	GEF	1.1 km	MPC · JPL
648500	2009 VG_{34}	—	October 24, 2009	Kitt Peak	Spacewatch	L4	7.2 km	MPC · JPL

== 648501–648600 ==
back to top

Designation			Discovery			Properties		Ref
Permanent	Provisional	Named after	Date	Site	Discoverer(s)	Category	Diam.	Ref
648501	2009 VA_{36}	—	November 10, 2009	Mount Lemmon	Mount Lemmon Survey	·	1.6 km	MPC · JPL
648502	2009 VT_{37}	—	November 8, 2009	Mount Lemmon	Mount Lemmon Survey	·	1.9 km	MPC · JPL
648503	2009 VQ_{38}	—	September 23, 2009	Mount Lemmon	Mount Lemmon Survey	·	530 m	MPC · JPL
648504	2009 VZ_{53}	—	September 5, 2008	Kitt Peak	Spacewatch	L4	6.4 km	MPC · JPL
648505	2009 VS_{55}	—	November 11, 2009	Kitt Peak	Spacewatch	H	450 m	MPC · JPL
648506	2009 VX_{55}	—	September 21, 2009	Kitt Peak	Spacewatch	·	770 m	MPC · JPL
648507	2009 VY_{55}	—	September 27, 2009	Kitt Peak	Spacewatch	·	490 m	MPC · JPL
648508	2009 VF_{59}	—	September 22, 2009	Mount Lemmon	Mount Lemmon Survey	·	740 m	MPC · JPL
648509	2009 VO_{62}	—	November 8, 2009	Kitt Peak	Spacewatch	·	600 m	MPC · JPL
648510	2009 VY_{64}	—	September 21, 2009	Mount Lemmon	Mount Lemmon Survey	·	540 m	MPC · JPL
648511	2009 VK_{84}	—	November 9, 2009	Kitt Peak	Spacewatch	·	1.6 km	MPC · JPL
648512	2009 VE_{86}	—	April 29, 2008	Mount Lemmon	Mount Lemmon Survey	(883)	810 m	MPC · JPL
648513	2009 VO_{87}	—	November 10, 2009	Kitt Peak	Spacewatch	(5)	1.0 km	MPC · JPL
648514	2009 VZ_{97}	—	November 9, 2009	Mount Lemmon	Mount Lemmon Survey	·	2.0 km	MPC · JPL
648515	2009 VJ_{107}	—	September 22, 2009	Mount Lemmon	Mount Lemmon Survey	·	660 m	MPC · JPL
648516	2009 VL_{107}	—	October 24, 2009	Kitt Peak	Spacewatch	·	1.3 km	MPC · JPL
648517	2009 VY_{107}	—	November 8, 2009	Mount Lemmon	Mount Lemmon Survey	H	510 m	MPC · JPL
648518	2009 VX_{108}	—	October 17, 1995	Kitt Peak	Spacewatch	·	710 m	MPC · JPL
648519	2009 VK_{109}	—	September 18, 2002	Palomar	NEAT	·	950 m	MPC · JPL
648520	2009 VO_{109}	—	February 22, 2007	Catalina	CSS	·	940 m	MPC · JPL
648521	2009 VL_{113}	—	October 27, 2009	Kitt Peak	Spacewatch	·	470 m	MPC · JPL
648522	2009 VP_{117}	—	October 17, 2009	Catalina	CSS	·	730 m	MPC · JPL
648523	2009 VX_{118}	—	November 8, 2009	Mount Lemmon	Mount Lemmon Survey	L4	6.2 km	MPC · JPL
648524	2009 VR_{121}	—	November 10, 2009	Kitt Peak	Spacewatch	V	490 m	MPC · JPL
648525	2009 VM_{122}	—	November 10, 2009	Catalina	CSS	·	1.9 km	MPC · JPL
648526	2009 VO_{122}	—	November 10, 2009	Kitt Peak	Spacewatch	·	1.8 km	MPC · JPL
648527	2009 VM_{124}	—	November 9, 2009	Mount Lemmon	Mount Lemmon Survey	·	700 m	MPC · JPL
648528	2009 VO_{124}	—	February 28, 2014	Haleakala	Pan-STARRS 1	·	560 m	MPC · JPL
648529	2009 VC_{127}	—	November 9, 2009	Mount Lemmon	Mount Lemmon Survey	PAD	1.3 km	MPC · JPL
648530	2009 VV_{128}	—	November 10, 2009	Kitt Peak	Spacewatch	L4	7.7 km	MPC · JPL
648531	2009 VF_{129}	—	November 11, 2009	Kitt Peak	Spacewatch	L4	6.2 km	MPC · JPL
648532	2009 VH_{129}	—	February 25, 2007	Kitt Peak	Spacewatch	·	570 m	MPC · JPL
648533	2009 VW_{129}	—	November 11, 2009	Mount Lemmon	Mount Lemmon Survey	·	570 m	MPC · JPL
648534	2009 VS_{130}	—	November 8, 2009	Mount Lemmon	Mount Lemmon Survey	PAD	1.3 km	MPC · JPL
648535	2009 VT_{131}	—	November 8, 2009	Mount Lemmon	Mount Lemmon Survey	·	1.5 km	MPC · JPL
648536	2009 VX_{131}	—	November 8, 2009	Mount Lemmon	Mount Lemmon Survey	HOF	1.7 km	MPC · JPL
648537	2009 WK_{2}	—	November 16, 2009	Mount Lemmon	Mount Lemmon Survey	·	1.3 km	MPC · JPL
648538	2009 WJ_{8}	—	October 1, 2008	Mount Lemmon	Mount Lemmon Survey	L4	6.1 km	MPC · JPL
648539	2009 WN_{12}	—	February 21, 2007	Kitt Peak	Spacewatch	·	530 m	MPC · JPL
648540	2009 WH_{13}	—	April 4, 2008	Kitt Peak	Spacewatch	·	800 m	MPC · JPL
648541	2009 WJ_{14}	—	November 16, 2009	Mount Lemmon	Mount Lemmon Survey	·	1.9 km	MPC · JPL
648542	2009 WZ_{17}	—	November 17, 2009	Mount Lemmon	Mount Lemmon Survey	·	1.3 km	MPC · JPL
648543	2009 WY_{20}	—	November 17, 2009	Mount Lemmon	Mount Lemmon Survey	·	990 m	MPC · JPL
648544	2009 WQ_{21}	—	November 18, 2009	Mount Lemmon	Mount Lemmon Survey	L4	8.5 km	MPC · JPL
648545	2009 WE_{30}	—	October 26, 2009	Kitt Peak	Spacewatch	V	480 m	MPC · JPL
648546	2009 WU_{30}	—	December 7, 2005	Kitt Peak	Spacewatch	·	1.1 km	MPC · JPL
648547	2009 WN_{33}	—	April 7, 2007	Mount Lemmon	Mount Lemmon Survey	·	530 m	MPC · JPL
648548	2009 WF_{41}	—	January 23, 2006	Kitt Peak	Spacewatch	KOR	1.7 km	MPC · JPL
648549	2009 WU_{42}	—	April 20, 2007	Kitt Peak	Spacewatch	·	1.6 km	MPC · JPL
648550	2009 WD_{46}	—	September 22, 2009	Mount Lemmon	Mount Lemmon Survey	·	630 m	MPC · JPL
648551	2009 WK_{47}	—	May 1, 2003	Kitt Peak	Spacewatch	HNS	1.1 km	MPC · JPL
648552	2009 WV_{49}	—	November 19, 2009	Mount Lemmon	Mount Lemmon Survey	·	720 m	MPC · JPL
648553	2009 WN_{50}	—	November 19, 2009	La Sagra	OAM	·	740 m	MPC · JPL
648554	2009 WS_{54}	—	October 11, 2009	Mount Lemmon	Mount Lemmon Survey	DOR	1.7 km	MPC · JPL
648555	2009 WY_{57}	—	November 16, 2009	Mount Lemmon	Mount Lemmon Survey	·	1.4 km	MPC · JPL
648556	2009 WJ_{58}	—	October 22, 2009	Mount Lemmon	Mount Lemmon Survey	L4	7.7 km	MPC · JPL
648557	2009 WV_{60}	—	November 16, 2009	Mount Lemmon	Mount Lemmon Survey	·	1.8 km	MPC · JPL
648558	2009 WM_{61}	—	April 6, 2002	Cerro Tololo	Deep Ecliptic Survey	·	1.3 km	MPC · JPL
648559	2009 WT_{61}	—	November 16, 2009	Mount Lemmon	Mount Lemmon Survey	·	1.4 km	MPC · JPL
648560	2009 WL_{63}	—	February 13, 2007	Mount Lemmon	Mount Lemmon Survey	·	480 m	MPC · JPL
648561	2009 WJ_{65}	—	September 21, 2009	Mount Lemmon	Mount Lemmon Survey	·	720 m	MPC · JPL
648562	2009 WH_{66}	—	November 17, 2009	Mount Lemmon	Mount Lemmon Survey	·	1.4 km	MPC · JPL
648563	2009 WO_{67}	—	January 7, 2006	Mount Lemmon	Mount Lemmon Survey	·	1.5 km	MPC · JPL
648564	2009 WT_{67}	—	September 21, 2008	Kitt Peak	Spacewatch	L4	7.3 km	MPC · JPL
648565	2009 WV_{67}	—	January 9, 2006	Kitt Peak	Spacewatch	AGN	850 m	MPC · JPL
648566	2009 WJ_{71}	—	November 18, 2009	Kitt Peak	Spacewatch	·	750 m	MPC · JPL
648567	2009 WF_{72}	—	November 18, 2009	Kitt Peak	Spacewatch	WIT	740 m	MPC · JPL
648568	2009 WW_{74}	—	November 18, 2009	Kitt Peak	Spacewatch	·	2.2 km	MPC · JPL
648569	2009 WD_{76}	—	May 6, 2008	Mount Lemmon	Mount Lemmon Survey	·	1.1 km	MPC · JPL
648570	2009 WM_{77}	—	September 12, 2002	Palomar	NEAT	·	520 m	MPC · JPL
648571	2009 WO_{81}	—	August 27, 2005	Palomar	NEAT	·	830 m	MPC · JPL
648572	2009 WW_{90}	—	November 19, 2009	Kitt Peak	Spacewatch	·	660 m	MPC · JPL
648573	2009 WK_{91}	—	November 19, 2009	Mount Lemmon	Mount Lemmon Survey	·	1.3 km	MPC · JPL
648574	2009 WN_{91}	—	November 11, 2009	Kitt Peak	Spacewatch	·	1.9 km	MPC · JPL
648575	2009 WT_{91}	—	August 27, 2005	Palomar	NEAT	·	900 m	MPC · JPL
648576	2009 WE_{92}	—	November 11, 2009	Kitt Peak	Spacewatch	·	1.4 km	MPC · JPL
648577	2009 WF_{96}	—	November 20, 2009	Mount Lemmon	Mount Lemmon Survey	AST	1.4 km	MPC · JPL
648578	2009 WJ_{97}	—	October 9, 2008	Mount Lemmon	Mount Lemmon Survey	TIR	3.8 km	MPC · JPL
648579	2009 WM_{97}	—	November 20, 2009	Mount Lemmon	Mount Lemmon Survey	·	1.8 km	MPC · JPL
648580	2009 WB_{101}	—	September 28, 2009	Mount Lemmon	Mount Lemmon Survey	·	1.4 km	MPC · JPL
648581	2009 WR_{104}	—	September 13, 2004	Kitt Peak	Spacewatch	·	2.0 km	MPC · JPL
648582	2009 WE_{107}	—	October 17, 2009	Mount Lemmon	Mount Lemmon Survey	·	2.0 km	MPC · JPL
648583	2009 WF_{108}	—	November 17, 2009	Mount Lemmon	Mount Lemmon Survey	·	1.4 km	MPC · JPL
648584	2009 WR_{110}	—	November 17, 2009	Mount Lemmon	Mount Lemmon Survey	·	590 m	MPC · JPL
648585	2009 WM_{114}	—	November 20, 2000	Kitt Peak	Spacewatch	·	1.3 km	MPC · JPL
648586	2009 WQ_{115}	—	October 22, 2009	Mount Lemmon	Mount Lemmon Survey	·	1.9 km	MPC · JPL
648587	2009 WN_{121}	—	October 22, 2009	Mount Lemmon	Mount Lemmon Survey	·	1.5 km	MPC · JPL
648588	2009 WB_{122}	—	November 8, 2009	Kitt Peak	Spacewatch	BAP	720 m	MPC · JPL
648589	2009 WB_{124}	—	November 20, 2009	Kitt Peak	Spacewatch	·	2.9 km	MPC · JPL
648590	2009 WK_{124}	—	November 20, 2009	Kitt Peak	Spacewatch	·	1.5 km	MPC · JPL
648591	2009 WR_{129}	—	October 27, 2009	Kitt Peak	Spacewatch	·	730 m	MPC · JPL
648592	2009 WX_{129}	—	November 16, 2009	Kitt Peak	Spacewatch	EUN	1.2 km	MPC · JPL
648593	2009 WN_{130}	—	November 20, 2009	Mount Lemmon	Mount Lemmon Survey	·	630 m	MPC · JPL
648594	2009 WN_{133}	—	November 22, 2009	Kitt Peak	Spacewatch	·	2.6 km	MPC · JPL
648595	2009 WA_{135}	—	October 27, 2009	Mount Lemmon	Mount Lemmon Survey	V	500 m	MPC · JPL
648596	2009 WO_{137}	—	November 16, 2009	Mount Lemmon	Mount Lemmon Survey	L4	7.3 km	MPC · JPL
648597	2009 WP_{139}	—	November 6, 2005	Kitt Peak	Spacewatch	·	1.3 km	MPC · JPL
648598	2009 WD_{141}	—	November 18, 2009	Mount Lemmon	Mount Lemmon Survey	·	610 m	MPC · JPL
648599	2009 WJ_{146}	—	September 28, 2009	Mount Lemmon	Mount Lemmon Survey	·	640 m	MPC · JPL
648600	2009 WH_{147}	—	October 12, 2009	Mount Lemmon	Mount Lemmon Survey	·	1.4 km	MPC · JPL

== 648601–648700 ==
back to top

Designation			Discovery			Properties		Ref
Permanent	Provisional	Named after	Date	Site	Discoverer(s)	Category	Diam.	Ref
648601	2009 WP_{148}	—	January 7, 2006	Kitt Peak	Spacewatch	·	1.5 km	MPC · JPL
648602	2009 WQ_{148}	—	October 14, 2009	Mount Lemmon	Mount Lemmon Survey	·	730 m	MPC · JPL
648603	2009 WB_{149}	—	November 19, 2009	Mount Lemmon	Mount Lemmon Survey	·	1.5 km	MPC · JPL
648604	2009 WK_{150}	—	November 19, 2009	Mount Lemmon	Mount Lemmon Survey	·	730 m	MPC · JPL
648605	2009 WB_{151}	—	October 12, 2009	Mount Lemmon	Mount Lemmon Survey	·	1.5 km	MPC · JPL
648606	2009 WL_{151}	—	November 19, 2009	Mount Lemmon	Mount Lemmon Survey	·	660 m	MPC · JPL
648607	2009 WC_{152}	—	November 19, 2009	Mount Lemmon	Mount Lemmon Survey	·	750 m	MPC · JPL
648608	2009 WE_{153}	—	January 26, 2003	Kitt Peak	Spacewatch	·	1.3 km	MPC · JPL
648609	2009 WT_{153}	—	November 19, 2009	Mount Lemmon	Mount Lemmon Survey	EUN	1.3 km	MPC · JPL
648610	2009 WE_{154}	—	January 14, 2007	Bergisch Gladbach	W. Bickel	·	820 m	MPC · JPL
648611	2009 WV_{154}	—	September 7, 2008	Mount Lemmon	Mount Lemmon Survey	L4	9.3 km	MPC · JPL
648612	2009 WX_{155}	—	March 9, 2007	Mount Lemmon	Mount Lemmon Survey	·	530 m	MPC · JPL
648613	2009 WZ_{155}	—	November 20, 2009	Kitt Peak	Spacewatch	·	1.7 km	MPC · JPL
648614	2009 WK_{163}	—	November 8, 2009	Mount Lemmon	Mount Lemmon Survey	(2076)	720 m	MPC · JPL
648615	2009 WS_{172}	—	November 22, 2009	Mount Lemmon	Mount Lemmon Survey	H	470 m	MPC · JPL
648616	2009 WD_{182}	—	November 23, 2009	Kitt Peak	Spacewatch	615	1.0 km	MPC · JPL
648617	2009 WL_{182}	—	November 23, 2009	Kitt Peak	Spacewatch	·	620 m	MPC · JPL
648618	2009 WQ_{184}	—	January 27, 2007	Mount Lemmon	Mount Lemmon Survey	·	590 m	MPC · JPL
648619	2009 WL_{187}	—	November 9, 2009	Kitt Peak	Spacewatch	·	1.9 km	MPC · JPL
648620	2009 WL_{190}	—	August 23, 2007	Kitt Peak	Spacewatch	L4	7.0 km	MPC · JPL
648621	2009 WK_{191}	—	August 25, 2004	Kitt Peak	Spacewatch	WIT	750 m	MPC · JPL
648622	2009 WF_{192}	—	November 24, 2009	Mount Lemmon	Mount Lemmon Survey	ADE	1.6 km	MPC · JPL
648623	2009 WJ_{192}	—	November 24, 2009	Mount Lemmon	Mount Lemmon Survey	AGN	1.0 km	MPC · JPL
648624	2009 WC_{196}	—	February 4, 2006	Kitt Peak	Spacewatch	AGN	950 m	MPC · JPL
648625	2009 WD_{196}	—	March 20, 2007	Mount Lemmon	Mount Lemmon Survey	·	2.0 km	MPC · JPL
648626	2009 WZ_{203}	—	September 30, 2009	Mount Lemmon	Mount Lemmon Survey	·	760 m	MPC · JPL
648627	2009 WD_{207}	—	November 17, 2009	Kitt Peak	Spacewatch	·	570 m	MPC · JPL
648628	2009 WC_{214}	—	November 19, 2009	Catalina	CSS	TIR	3.3 km	MPC · JPL
648629	2009 WN_{214}	—	November 20, 2009	Kitt Peak	Spacewatch	·	1.6 km	MPC · JPL
648630	2009 WH_{215}	—	November 23, 2009	Catalina	CSS	·	780 m	MPC · JPL
648631	2009 WO_{216}	—	October 20, 2003	Palomar	NEAT	EOS	2.6 km	MPC · JPL
648632	2009 WV_{218}	—	September 15, 2009	Kitt Peak	Spacewatch	·	1.3 km	MPC · JPL
648633	2009 WY_{218}	—	September 22, 2009	Mount Lemmon	Mount Lemmon Survey	L4	6.0 km	MPC · JPL
648634	2009 WR_{220}	—	September 18, 2009	Mount Lemmon	Mount Lemmon Survey	·	1.4 km	MPC · JPL
648635	2009 WS_{221}	—	October 22, 2009	Mount Lemmon	Mount Lemmon Survey	NYS	780 m	MPC · JPL
648636	2009 WQ_{226}	—	November 17, 2009	Mount Lemmon	Mount Lemmon Survey	L4	5.8 km	MPC · JPL
648637	2009 WM_{227}	—	November 17, 2009	Mount Lemmon	Mount Lemmon Survey	·	670 m	MPC · JPL
648638	2009 WK_{230}	—	November 17, 2009	Mount Lemmon	Mount Lemmon Survey	L4	6.8 km	MPC · JPL
648639	2009 WE_{232}	—	October 12, 2009	Mount Lemmon	Mount Lemmon Survey	·	740 m	MPC · JPL
648640	2009 WF_{232}	—	April 29, 2008	Mount Lemmon	Mount Lemmon Survey	·	1.7 km	MPC · JPL
648641	2009 WP_{232}	—	November 17, 2009	Mount Lemmon	Mount Lemmon Survey	·	550 m	MPC · JPL
648642	2009 WZ_{232}	—	November 17, 2009	Mount Lemmon	Mount Lemmon Survey	·	1.3 km	MPC · JPL
648643	2009 WY_{233}	—	January 10, 2007	Mount Lemmon	Mount Lemmon Survey	·	570 m	MPC · JPL
648644	2009 WT_{238}	—	October 29, 2005	Mount Lemmon	Mount Lemmon Survey	·	1.6 km	MPC · JPL
648645	2009 WQ_{239}	—	November 17, 2009	Kitt Peak	Spacewatch	AST	1.4 km	MPC · JPL
648646	2009 WX_{239}	—	July 5, 2000	Kitt Peak	Spacewatch	KON	1.6 km	MPC · JPL
648647	2009 WX_{240}	—	May 10, 2003	Kitt Peak	Spacewatch	EUN	1.3 km	MPC · JPL
648648	2009 WL_{241}	—	November 18, 2009	Mount Lemmon	Mount Lemmon Survey	·	1.3 km	MPC · JPL
648649	2009 WM_{246}	—	November 24, 2009	Kitt Peak	Spacewatch	·	490 m	MPC · JPL
648650	2009 WP_{246}	—	November 24, 2009	Kitt Peak	Spacewatch	MRX	1.0 km	MPC · JPL
648651	2009 WO_{248}	—	November 17, 2009	Mount Lemmon	Mount Lemmon Survey	·	550 m	MPC · JPL
648652	2009 WR_{248}	—	July 15, 2005	Kitt Peak	Spacewatch	·	780 m	MPC · JPL
648653	2009 WS_{252}	—	November 26, 2009	Mount Lemmon	Mount Lemmon Survey	AGN	1 km	MPC · JPL
648654	2009 WK_{256}	—	October 21, 1995	Kitt Peak	Spacewatch	(2076)	710 m	MPC · JPL
648655	2009 WQ_{256}	—	October 16, 2009	Mount Lemmon	Mount Lemmon Survey	·	670 m	MPC · JPL
648656	2009 WC_{257}	—	July 6, 2005	Kitt Peak	Spacewatch	·	850 m	MPC · JPL
648657	2009 WG_{266}	—	October 22, 2009	Mount Lemmon	Mount Lemmon Survey	·	640 m	MPC · JPL
648658	2009 WR_{266}	—	November 23, 2009	Mount Lemmon	Mount Lemmon Survey	HOF	2.1 km	MPC · JPL
648659	2009 WU_{271}	—	November 25, 2009	Mount Lemmon	Mount Lemmon Survey	·	960 m	MPC · JPL
648660	2009 WS_{272}	—	April 15, 2012	Haleakala	Pan-STARRS 1	·	1.0 km	MPC · JPL
648661	2009 WM_{278}	—	October 6, 2012	Haleakala	Pan-STARRS 1	·	800 m	MPC · JPL
648662	2009 WD_{281}	—	March 18, 2018	Haleakala	Pan-STARRS 1	·	630 m	MPC · JPL
648663	2009 WJ_{281}	—	October 25, 2009	Kitt Peak	Spacewatch	·	2.0 km	MPC · JPL
648664	2009 WF_{287}	—	February 5, 2011	Haleakala	Pan-STARRS 1	·	1.4 km	MPC · JPL
648665	2009 WL_{288}	—	November 17, 2009	Kitt Peak	Spacewatch	·	1.5 km	MPC · JPL
648666	2009 WQ_{288}	—	November 25, 2009	Kitt Peak	Spacewatch	·	630 m	MPC · JPL
648667	2009 WY_{288}	—	November 24, 2009	Mount Lemmon	Mount Lemmon Survey	L4	6.4 km	MPC · JPL
648668	2009 WU_{290}	—	November 24, 2009	Mount Lemmon	Mount Lemmon Survey	·	1.3 km	MPC · JPL
648669	2009 WZ_{293}	—	November 18, 2009	Kitt Peak	Spacewatch	L4	7.1 km	MPC · JPL
648670	2009 WU_{294}	—	November 18, 2009	Kitt Peak	Spacewatch	ULA	4.5 km	MPC · JPL
648671	2009 WO_{295}	—	November 21, 2009	Kitt Peak	Spacewatch	·	2.2 km	MPC · JPL
648672	2009 WB_{299}	—	November 16, 2009	Mount Lemmon	Mount Lemmon Survey	L4	6.8 km	MPC · JPL
648673	2009 WA_{301}	—	November 24, 2009	Kitt Peak	Spacewatch	·	1.3 km	MPC · JPL
648674	2009 XP	—	December 8, 2009	La Sagra	OAM	H	460 m	MPC · JPL
648675	2009 XK_{5}	—	December 10, 2009	Mount Lemmon	Mount Lemmon Survey	H	530 m	MPC · JPL
648676	2009 XY_{10}	—	December 10, 2009	Mount Lemmon	Mount Lemmon Survey	·	1.6 km	MPC · JPL
648677	2009 XX_{11}	—	October 8, 2008	Kitt Peak	Spacewatch	L4	8.3 km	MPC · JPL
648678	2009 XC_{13}	—	August 26, 2005	Palomar	NEAT	·	760 m	MPC · JPL
648679	2009 XZ_{14}	—	December 15, 2009	Catalina	CSS	·	660 m	MPC · JPL
648680	2009 XB_{18}	—	December 15, 2009	Mount Lemmon	Mount Lemmon Survey	·	720 m	MPC · JPL
648681	2009 XS_{21}	—	November 21, 2009	Catalina	CSS	·	670 m	MPC · JPL
648682	2009 XX_{25}	—	January 28, 2007	Kitt Peak	Spacewatch	·	830 m	MPC · JPL
648683	2009 XV_{27}	—	January 20, 2015	Haleakala	Pan-STARRS 1	·	960 m	MPC · JPL
648684	2009 XA_{29}	—	December 15, 2009	Mount Lemmon	Mount Lemmon Survey	·	1 km	MPC · JPL
648685	2009 XA_{30}	—	December 10, 2009	Mount Lemmon	Mount Lemmon Survey	·	710 m	MPC · JPL
648686	2009 YD_{2}	—	February 25, 2006	Mount Lemmon	Mount Lemmon Survey	AEO	1.1 km	MPC · JPL
648687	2009 YJ_{3}	—	December 17, 2009	Kitt Peak	Spacewatch	·	790 m	MPC · JPL
648688	2009 YL_{9}	—	December 17, 2009	Mount Lemmon	Mount Lemmon Survey	MAR	1.3 km	MPC · JPL
648689	2009 YS_{9}	—	December 17, 2009	Mount Lemmon	Mount Lemmon Survey	AEO	1.1 km	MPC · JPL
648690	2009 YP_{10}	—	July 6, 2005	Siding Spring	SSS	·	1.0 km	MPC · JPL
648691	2009 YU_{18}	—	December 28, 2009	Modra	L. Kornoš, J. Világi	H	630 m	MPC · JPL
648692	2009 YQ_{19}	—	December 25, 2009	Kitt Peak	Spacewatch	DOR	1.9 km	MPC · JPL
648693	2009 YX_{20}	—	September 29, 2003	Anderson Mesa	LONEOS	·	2.6 km	MPC · JPL
648694	2009 YP_{26}	—	October 31, 2005	Mount Lemmon	Mount Lemmon Survey	V	690 m	MPC · JPL
648695	2009 YC_{32}	—	December 18, 2009	Kitt Peak	Spacewatch	·	2.1 km	MPC · JPL
648696	2009 YE_{32}	—	December 19, 2009	Mount Lemmon	Mount Lemmon Survey	·	1.1 km	MPC · JPL
648697	2009 YF_{34}	—	December 27, 2009	Kitt Peak	Spacewatch	·	830 m	MPC · JPL
648698	2010 AS_{18}	—	February 7, 2002	Palomar	NEAT	·	1.2 km	MPC · JPL
648699	2010 AK_{29}	—	October 31, 2005	Mauna Kea	A. Boattini	·	2.2 km	MPC · JPL
648700	2010 AC_{33}	—	January 7, 2010	Kitt Peak	Spacewatch	DOR	2.1 km	MPC · JPL

== 648701–648800 ==
back to top

Designation			Discovery			Properties		Ref
Permanent	Provisional	Named after	Date	Site	Discoverer(s)	Category	Diam.	Ref
648701	2010 AO_{33}	—	January 7, 2010	Kitt Peak	Spacewatch	·	660 m	MPC · JPL
648702	2010 AT_{33}	—	January 7, 2010	Kitt Peak	Spacewatch	·	690 m	MPC · JPL
648703	2010 AR_{46}	—	July 29, 2008	Mount Lemmon	Mount Lemmon Survey	WIT	890 m	MPC · JPL
648704	2010 AK_{63}	—	January 8, 2010	Mount Lemmon	Mount Lemmon Survey	EUN	1.2 km	MPC · JPL
648705	2010 AP_{72}	—	January 13, 2010	Mount Lemmon	Mount Lemmon Survey	·	530 m	MPC · JPL
648706	2010 AP_{73}	—	December 2, 2005	Kitt Peak	Spacewatch	·	1.3 km	MPC · JPL
648707	2010 AF_{159}	—	January 20, 2015	Haleakala	Pan-STARRS 1	·	1.5 km	MPC · JPL
648708	2010 AZ_{160}	—	November 10, 2016	Haleakala	Pan-STARRS 1	·	580 m	MPC · JPL
648709 Angissimo	2010 BV_{4}	Angissimo	January 24, 2010	Nogales	J.-C. Merlin	·	670 m	MPC · JPL
648710	2010 BW_{144}	—	January 26, 2010	WISE	WISE	DOR	1.8 km	MPC · JPL
648711	2010 CV_{1}	—	January 15, 2010	Catalina	CSS	·	830 m	MPC · JPL
648712	2010 CU_{26}	—	February 9, 2010	Mount Lemmon	Mount Lemmon Survey	·	1.3 km	MPC · JPL
648713	2010 CR_{32}	—	September 3, 2008	Kitt Peak	Spacewatch	·	2.1 km	MPC · JPL
648714	2010 CD_{35}	—	February 10, 2010	Kitt Peak	Spacewatch	·	650 m	MPC · JPL
648715	2010 CX_{36}	—	February 9, 2010	Mount Lemmon	Mount Lemmon Survey	·	1.5 km	MPC · JPL
648716	2010 CJ_{64}	—	July 19, 2007	Mount Lemmon	Mount Lemmon Survey	·	2.1 km	MPC · JPL
648717	2010 CM_{67}	—	August 19, 2001	Cerro Tololo	Deep Ecliptic Survey	·	730 m	MPC · JPL
648718	2010 CG_{74}	—	November 19, 2008	Mount Lemmon	Mount Lemmon Survey	KOR	1.2 km	MPC · JPL
648719	2010 CD_{76}	—	January 4, 2003	Kitt Peak	Spacewatch	·	940 m	MPC · JPL
648720	2010 CO_{79}	—	February 13, 2010	Mount Lemmon	Mount Lemmon Survey	·	1.8 km	MPC · JPL
648721	2010 CS_{83}	—	February 14, 2010	Kitt Peak	Spacewatch	·	830 m	MPC · JPL
648722	2010 CS_{85}	—	January 26, 2001	Kitt Peak	Spacewatch	·	1.7 km	MPC · JPL
648723	2010 CU_{89}	—	February 14, 2010	Mount Lemmon	Mount Lemmon Survey	V	560 m	MPC · JPL
648724	2010 CU_{90}	—	September 29, 2008	Mount Lemmon	Mount Lemmon Survey	·	2.4 km	MPC · JPL
648725	2010 CC_{92}	—	February 14, 2010	Mount Lemmon	Mount Lemmon Survey	·	1.7 km	MPC · JPL
648726	2010 CB_{99}	—	February 14, 2010	Kitt Peak	Spacewatch	MAS	540 m	MPC · JPL
648727	2010 CZ_{99}	—	February 14, 2010	Mount Lemmon	Mount Lemmon Survey	AGN	1.0 km	MPC · JPL
648728	2010 CX_{100}	—	February 14, 2010	Mount Lemmon	Mount Lemmon Survey	AEO	960 m	MPC · JPL
648729	2010 CX_{101}	—	February 14, 2010	Mount Lemmon	Mount Lemmon Survey	·	1.9 km	MPC · JPL
648730	2010 CE_{110}	—	February 14, 2010	Mount Lemmon	Mount Lemmon Survey	·	560 m	MPC · JPL
648731	2010 CS_{110}	—	February 14, 2010	Mount Lemmon	Mount Lemmon Survey	·	1.5 km	MPC · JPL
648732	2010 CT_{112}	—	February 14, 2010	Mount Lemmon	Mount Lemmon Survey	·	790 m	MPC · JPL
648733	2010 CM_{114}	—	September 24, 2008	Mount Lemmon	Mount Lemmon Survey	KOR	1.3 km	MPC · JPL
648734	2010 CH_{115}	—	February 14, 2010	Mount Lemmon	Mount Lemmon Survey	V	500 m	MPC · JPL
648735	2010 CW_{117}	—	September 4, 2008	Kitt Peak	Spacewatch	·	1.6 km	MPC · JPL
648736	2010 CE_{118}	—	January 7, 2010	Kitt Peak	Spacewatch	NYS	660 m	MPC · JPL
648737	2010 CC_{119}	—	January 8, 2010	Kitt Peak	Spacewatch	·	1.3 km	MPC · JPL
648738	2010 CN_{121}	—	February 15, 2010	Kitt Peak	Spacewatch	KOR	1.2 km	MPC · JPL
648739	2010 CN_{125}	—	February 15, 2010	Kitt Peak	Spacewatch	·	770 m	MPC · JPL
648740	2010 CZ_{126}	—	February 15, 2010	Mount Lemmon	Mount Lemmon Survey	·	840 m	MPC · JPL
648741	2010 CB_{127}	—	September 20, 2001	Kitt Peak	Spacewatch	·	730 m	MPC · JPL
648742	2010 CV_{157}	—	February 15, 2010	Kitt Peak	Spacewatch	·	960 m	MPC · JPL
648743	2010 CC_{167}	—	February 14, 2010	Mount Lemmon	Mount Lemmon Survey	·	1.5 km	MPC · JPL
648744	2010 CZ_{168}	—	December 15, 2009	Mount Lemmon	Mount Lemmon Survey	NYS	1.1 km	MPC · JPL
648745	2010 CL_{169}	—	March 5, 2002	Apache Point	SDSS Collaboration	·	900 m	MPC · JPL
648746	2010 CD_{172}	—	February 15, 2010	Kitt Peak	Spacewatch	·	730 m	MPC · JPL
648747	2010 CY_{173}	—	October 10, 2008	Mount Lemmon	Mount Lemmon Survey	·	1.9 km	MPC · JPL
648748	2010 CT_{174}	—	February 9, 2010	Kitt Peak	Spacewatch	·	2.1 km	MPC · JPL
648749	2010 CT_{175}	—	February 9, 2010	Mount Lemmon	Mount Lemmon Survey	·	1.7 km	MPC · JPL
648750	2010 CY_{184}	—	February 17, 2010	Mount Lemmon	Mount Lemmon Survey	·	790 m	MPC · JPL
648751	2010 CD_{253}	—	July 24, 2015	Haleakala	Pan-STARRS 1	·	1.1 km	MPC · JPL
648752	2010 CW_{265}	—	October 1, 2013	Mount Lemmon	Mount Lemmon Survey	·	1.5 km	MPC · JPL
648753	2010 CQ_{273}	—	November 28, 1994	Kitt Peak	Spacewatch	·	760 m	MPC · JPL
648754	2010 CC_{277}	—	April 1, 2011	Mount Lemmon	Mount Lemmon Survey	·	2.2 km	MPC · JPL
648755	2010 DL_{3}	—	February 16, 2010	Kitt Peak	Spacewatch	MAS	540 m	MPC · JPL
648756	2010 DF_{5}	—	February 16, 2010	Mount Lemmon	Mount Lemmon Survey	(2076)	530 m	MPC · JPL
648757	2010 DB_{9}	—	February 16, 2010	Mount Lemmon	Mount Lemmon Survey	·	1.2 km	MPC · JPL
648758	2010 DT_{36}	—	September 6, 2008	Kitt Peak	Spacewatch	·	1.3 km	MPC · JPL
648759	2010 DD_{37}	—	October 8, 2008	Catalina	CSS	·	1.6 km	MPC · JPL
648760	2010 DP_{44}	—	February 17, 2010	Kitt Peak	Spacewatch	·	600 m	MPC · JPL
648761	2010 DT_{44}	—	February 17, 2010	Kitt Peak	Spacewatch	NYS	740 m	MPC · JPL
648762	2010 DP_{74}	—	February 19, 2010	Mount Lemmon	Mount Lemmon Survey	·	890 m	MPC · JPL
648763	2010 DR_{74}	—	December 6, 2005	Kitt Peak	Spacewatch	NYS	660 m	MPC · JPL
648764	2010 DN_{91}	—	October 4, 2018	Haleakala	Pan-STARRS 2	EOS	1.3 km	MPC · JPL
648765	2010 DP_{99}	—	September 4, 2011	Haleakala	Pan-STARRS 1	LIX	2.9 km	MPC · JPL
648766	2010 DU_{103}	—	October 21, 2006	Kitt Peak	Spacewatch	·	2.7 km	MPC · JPL
648767	2010 DY_{114}	—	February 16, 2010	Mount Lemmon	Mount Lemmon Survey	(2076)	680 m	MPC · JPL
648768	2010 EH_{35}	—	February 1, 2003	Kitt Peak	Spacewatch	·	730 m	MPC · JPL
648769	2010 EP_{44}	—	March 12, 2010	Calvin-Rehoboth	L. A. Molnar	·	590 m	MPC · JPL
648770	2010 EQ_{72}	—	March 13, 2010	Mount Lemmon	Mount Lemmon Survey	·	1.2 km	MPC · JPL
648771	2010 EY_{73}	—	September 29, 2008	Kitt Peak	Spacewatch	·	670 m	MPC · JPL
648772	2010 EG_{84}	—	March 13, 2010	Kitt Peak	Spacewatch	·	980 m	MPC · JPL
648773	2010 ER_{95}	—	March 14, 2010	Mount Lemmon	Mount Lemmon Survey	·	820 m	MPC · JPL
648774	2010 EK_{120}	—	February 13, 2010	Mount Lemmon	Mount Lemmon Survey	MAS	540 m	MPC · JPL
648775	2010 EP_{128}	—	March 12, 2010	Kitt Peak	Spacewatch	·	960 m	MPC · JPL
648776	2010 EF_{131}	—	December 26, 2005	Kitt Peak	Spacewatch	NYS	720 m	MPC · JPL
648777	2010 EH_{133}	—	March 11, 2005	Kitt Peak	Spacewatch	·	1.9 km	MPC · JPL
648778	2010 EV_{183}	—	January 25, 2015	Haleakala	Pan-STARRS 1	·	1.3 km	MPC · JPL
648779	2010 FG_{2}	—	March 16, 2010	Mount Lemmon	Mount Lemmon Survey	·	1.7 km	MPC · JPL
648780	2010 FM_{11}	—	March 16, 2010	Kitt Peak	Spacewatch	KOR	1.1 km	MPC · JPL
648781	2010 FG_{12}	—	March 16, 2010	Kitt Peak	Spacewatch	·	1.2 km	MPC · JPL
648782	2010 FM_{14}	—	August 10, 2007	Kitt Peak	Spacewatch	·	930 m	MPC · JPL
648783	2010 FC_{16}	—	September 11, 2007	Mount Lemmon	Mount Lemmon Survey	·	2.0 km	MPC · JPL
648784	2010 FD_{17}	—	March 18, 2010	Kitt Peak	Spacewatch	·	970 m	MPC · JPL
648785	2010 FJ_{19}	—	March 18, 2010	Kitt Peak	Spacewatch	·	820 m	MPC · JPL
648786	2010 FB_{26}	—	March 19, 2010	Mount Lemmon	Mount Lemmon Survey	·	1.9 km	MPC · JPL
648787	2010 FP_{28}	—	March 26, 2006	Kitt Peak	Spacewatch	·	2.5 km	MPC · JPL
648788	2010 FJ_{29}	—	January 6, 2006	Kitt Peak	Spacewatch	·	820 m	MPC · JPL
648789	2010 FD_{94}	—	September 13, 2007	Kitt Peak	Spacewatch	EOS	1.9 km	MPC · JPL
648790	2010 FZ_{97}	—	March 18, 2010	Mount Lemmon	Mount Lemmon Survey	·	1.8 km	MPC · JPL
648791	2010 FN_{99}	—	October 1, 2005	Mount Lemmon	Mount Lemmon Survey	T_{j} (2.99) · 3:2	4.9 km	MPC · JPL
648792	2010 FP_{126}	—	March 19, 2010	WISE	WISE	LUT	3.2 km	MPC · JPL
648793	2010 FJ_{138}	—	September 26, 2012	Mount Lemmon	Mount Lemmon Survey	EOS	1.7 km	MPC · JPL
648794	2010 FR_{144}	—	March 18, 2010	Mount Lemmon	Mount Lemmon Survey	·	810 m	MPC · JPL
648795	2010 FS_{144}	—	March 19, 2010	Kitt Peak	Spacewatch	·	1.8 km	MPC · JPL
648796	2010 GQ_{34}	—	February 17, 2010	Kitt Peak	Spacewatch	·	1.2 km	MPC · JPL
648797	2010 GH_{91}	—	April 13, 2010	WISE	WISE	·	3.8 km	MPC · JPL
648798	2010 GF_{100}	—	April 4, 2010	Kitt Peak	Spacewatch	·	1.1 km	MPC · JPL
648799	2010 GR_{106}	—	January 31, 2006	Kitt Peak	Spacewatch	·	840 m	MPC · JPL
648800	2010 GL_{109}	—	September 11, 2007	Mount Lemmon	Mount Lemmon Survey	KOR	1.2 km	MPC · JPL

== 648801–648900 ==
back to top

Designation			Discovery			Properties		Ref
Permanent	Provisional	Named after	Date	Site	Discoverer(s)	Category	Diam.	Ref
648801	2010 GV_{109}	—	March 31, 2003	Kitt Peak	Spacewatch	·	1.3 km	MPC · JPL
648802	2010 GX_{110}	—	April 9, 2010	Kitt Peak	Spacewatch	·	980 m	MPC · JPL
648803	2010 GM_{123}	—	April 14, 2010	Kitt Peak	Spacewatch	·	1.1 km	MPC · JPL
648804	2010 GU_{123}	—	April 14, 2010	Mount Lemmon	Mount Lemmon Survey	BRA	1.3 km	MPC · JPL
648805	2010 GG_{142}	—	March 12, 2010	Kitt Peak	Spacewatch	MAS	610 m	MPC · JPL
648806	2010 GN_{155}	—	April 15, 2010	WISE	WISE	·	1.0 km	MPC · JPL
648807	2010 GX_{179}	—	October 23, 2013	Kitt Peak	Spacewatch	·	2.0 km	MPC · JPL
648808	2010 GD_{189}	—	July 25, 2022	Haleakala	Pan-STARRS 2	·	2.7 km	MPC · JPL
648809	2010 GQ_{206}	—	April 14, 2010	Mount Lemmon	Mount Lemmon Survey	·	1.7 km	MPC · JPL
648810	2010 GM_{207}	—	April 11, 2010	Kitt Peak	Spacewatch	MAS	540 m	MPC · JPL
648811	2010 GS_{210}	—	April 10, 2010	Mount Lemmon	Mount Lemmon Survey	EOS	1.4 km	MPC · JPL
648812	2010 GC_{212}	—	April 15, 2010	Mount Lemmon	Mount Lemmon Survey	·	1.4 km	MPC · JPL
648813	2010 HO_{35}	—	August 30, 2005	Kitt Peak	Spacewatch	·	4.1 km	MPC · JPL
648814	2010 HC_{78}	—	April 20, 2010	Mount Lemmon	Mount Lemmon Survey	·	1.8 km	MPC · JPL
648815	2010 HJ_{105}	—	April 25, 2010	Kitt Peak	Spacewatch	·	1.7 km	MPC · JPL
648816	2010 HV_{114}	—	February 7, 2006	Kitt Peak	Spacewatch	·	910 m	MPC · JPL
648817	2010 HH_{118}	—	December 16, 2015	Mount Lemmon	Mount Lemmon Survey	KON	2.1 km	MPC · JPL
648818	2010 HL_{125}	—	February 4, 2005	Kitt Peak	Spacewatch	·	1.1 km	MPC · JPL
648819	2010 HT_{128}	—	February 28, 2009	Kitt Peak	Spacewatch	LIX	2.7 km	MPC · JPL
648820	2010 HU_{129}	—	April 23, 2015	Haleakala	Pan-STARRS 1	HYG	2.3 km	MPC · JPL
648821	2010 JN_{29}	—	April 10, 2010	Mount Lemmon	Mount Lemmon Survey	·	1.3 km	MPC · JPL
648822	2010 JJ_{33}	—	October 24, 2008	Mount Lemmon	Mount Lemmon Survey	·	840 m	MPC · JPL
648823	2010 JM_{40}	—	October 7, 2005	Mauna Kea	A. Boattini	·	840 m	MPC · JPL
648824	2010 JT_{44}	—	February 2, 2006	Kitt Peak	Spacewatch	·	990 m	MPC · JPL
648825	2010 JU_{47}	—	May 3, 2010	Kitt Peak	Spacewatch	EOS	2.2 km	MPC · JPL
648826	2010 JR_{48}	—	April 9, 2010	Mount Lemmon	Mount Lemmon Survey	·	1.8 km	MPC · JPL
648827	2010 JY_{119}	—	November 12, 2001	Apache Point	SDSS Collaboration	EOS	1.5 km	MPC · JPL
648828	2010 JJ_{156}	—	November 4, 2007	Kitt Peak	Spacewatch	ARM	3.0 km	MPC · JPL
648829	2010 JD_{157}	—	May 11, 2010	Mount Lemmon	Mount Lemmon Survey	·	900 m	MPC · JPL
648830	2010 JM_{157}	—	October 14, 2007	Mount Lemmon	Mount Lemmon Survey	·	2.6 km	MPC · JPL
648831	2010 JT_{164}	—	May 9, 2010	Mount Lemmon	Mount Lemmon Survey	·	1.9 km	MPC · JPL
648832	2010 JU_{164}	—	September 25, 2006	Mount Lemmon	Mount Lemmon Survey	·	1.8 km	MPC · JPL
648833	2010 JL_{171}	—	April 9, 2010	Kitt Peak	Spacewatch	·	1.7 km	MPC · JPL
648834	2010 JX_{173}	—	April 25, 2015	Haleakala	Pan-STARRS 1	·	1.5 km	MPC · JPL
648835	2010 JZ_{173}	—	May 20, 2015	Cerro Tololo	DECam	KOR	900 m	MPC · JPL
648836	2010 JC_{176}	—	May 14, 2010	Mount Lemmon	Mount Lemmon Survey	·	1.1 km	MPC · JPL
648837	2010 JE_{194}	—	April 4, 2014	Haleakala	Pan-STARRS 1	·	2.7 km	MPC · JPL
648838	2010 JH_{199}	—	September 18, 2003	Kitt Peak	Spacewatch	·	1.5 km	MPC · JPL
648839	2010 JA_{203}	—	September 30, 2005	Mount Lemmon	Mount Lemmon Survey	·	2.4 km	MPC · JPL
648840	2010 JS_{210}	—	October 20, 2012	Haleakala	Pan-STARRS 1	·	1.9 km	MPC · JPL
648841	2010 JO_{212}	—	October 31, 2007	Kitt Peak	Spacewatch	·	2.0 km	MPC · JPL
648842	2010 KD_{130}	—	October 20, 2007	Mount Lemmon	Mount Lemmon Survey	·	2.1 km	MPC · JPL
648843	2010 KN_{133}	—	March 8, 2008	Mount Lemmon	Mount Lemmon Survey	·	2.6 km	MPC · JPL
648844	2010 KU_{156}	—	May 19, 2010	Kitt Peak	Spacewatch	(5)	1.1 km	MPC · JPL
648845	2010 LK	—	June 3, 2010	Nogales	M. Schwartz, P. R. Holvorcem	H	560 m	MPC · JPL
648846	2010 LF_{106}	—	July 4, 2005	Kitt Peak	Spacewatch	·	2.0 km	MPC · JPL
648847	2010 LP_{108}	—	January 13, 2008	Kitt Peak	Spacewatch	URS	3.6 km	MPC · JPL
648848	2010 LC_{134}	—	June 11, 2010	Mount Lemmon	Mount Lemmon Survey	·	2.7 km	MPC · JPL
648849	2010 LU_{135}	—	June 22, 2014	Haleakala	Pan-STARRS 1	·	1.1 km	MPC · JPL
648850	2010 LA_{151}	—	May 3, 2014	Mount Lemmon	Mount Lemmon Survey	·	2.0 km	MPC · JPL
648851	2010 LJ_{159}	—	June 15, 2010	Mount Lemmon	Mount Lemmon Survey	BRA	1.4 km	MPC · JPL
648852	2010 LS_{159}	—	June 14, 2010	Mount Lemmon	Mount Lemmon Survey	·	580 m	MPC · JPL
648853	2010 MO	—	June 16, 2010	Nogales		·	1.6 km	MPC · JPL
648854	2010 MR_{1}	—	June 9, 2010	Catalina	CSS	·	1.6 km	MPC · JPL
648855	2010 ME_{118}	—	October 15, 2012	Haleakala	Pan-STARRS 1	·	3.0 km	MPC · JPL
648856	2010 MY_{131}	—	January 20, 2015	Haleakala	Pan-STARRS 1	·	2.5 km	MPC · JPL
648857	2010 MX_{149}	—	June 22, 2010	Mount Lemmon	Mount Lemmon Survey	·	2.6 km	MPC · JPL
648858	2010 ND_{4}	—	August 23, 2003	Palomar	NEAT	·	900 m	MPC · JPL
648859	2010 NL_{63}	—	July 11, 2010	WISE	WISE	·	2.2 km	MPC · JPL
648860	2010 NF_{104}	—	May 16, 2005	Palomar	NEAT	·	2.6 km	MPC · JPL
648861	2010 NG_{105}	—	July 12, 2010	WISE	WISE	·	3.0 km	MPC · JPL
648862	2010 NH_{116}	—	July 14, 2010	WISE	WISE	BRU	2.6 km	MPC · JPL
648863	2010 NE_{118}	—	October 29, 2005	Palomar	NEAT	EOS	2.2 km	MPC · JPL
648864	2010 NM_{118}	—	December 3, 2014	Haleakala	Pan-STARRS 1	L5	8.9 km	MPC · JPL
648865	2010 NK_{124}	—	October 14, 2010	Mount Lemmon	Mount Lemmon Survey	·	2.7 km	MPC · JPL
648866	2010 NS_{130}	—	October 13, 2017	Mount Lemmon	Mount Lemmon Survey	·	2.1 km	MPC · JPL
648867	2010 NL_{140}	—	April 14, 2008	Kitt Peak	Spacewatch	·	2.2 km	MPC · JPL
648868	2010 NS_{148}	—	July 8, 2010	Kitt Peak	Spacewatch	·	1.1 km	MPC · JPL
648869	2010 OR_{126}	—	November 11, 2006	Mount Lemmon	Mount Lemmon Survey	·	3.1 km	MPC · JPL
648870	2010 OB_{127}	—	August 14, 2002	Palomar	NEAT	EUN	940 m	MPC · JPL
648871	2010 OE_{140}	—	January 28, 2015	Haleakala	Pan-STARRS 1	·	2.9 km	MPC · JPL
648872	2010 OH_{153}	—	September 16, 2006	Catalina	CSS	·	1.5 km	MPC · JPL
648873	2010 PW_{22}	—	August 8, 2010	Dauban	C. Rinner, Kugel, F.	·	550 m	MPC · JPL
648874	2010 PD_{25}	—	June 17, 2010	Mount Lemmon	Mount Lemmon Survey	TIR	2.4 km	MPC · JPL
648875	2010 PE_{60}	—	August 10, 2010	Kitt Peak	Spacewatch	·	900 m	MPC · JPL
648876	2010 PW_{64}	—	August 10, 2010	Kitt Peak	Spacewatch	EOS	1.5 km	MPC · JPL
648877	2010 PM_{66}	—	January 4, 2001	Haleakala	NEAT	H	680 m	MPC · JPL
648878	2010 PA_{79}	—	August 7, 2010	XuYi	PMO NEO Survey Program	ADE	1.7 km	MPC · JPL
648879	2010 PU_{80}	—	October 7, 2010	Catalina	CSS	·	3.3 km	MPC · JPL
648880	2010 QL	—	August 16, 2010	La Sagra	OAM	·	1.2 km	MPC · JPL
648881	2010 QB_{3}	—	August 20, 2010	Kitt Peak	Spacewatch	·	990 m	MPC · JPL
648882	2010 QN_{6}	—	August 19, 2010	Kitt Peak	Spacewatch	·	2.1 km	MPC · JPL
648883	2010 RE_{3}	—	September 1, 2010	Socorro	LINEAR	H	490 m	MPC · JPL
648884	2010 RJ_{7}	—	September 2, 2010	Mount Lemmon	Mount Lemmon Survey	·	920 m	MPC · JPL
648885	2010 RD_{13}	—	September 1, 2010	Mount Lemmon	Mount Lemmon Survey	·	860 m	MPC · JPL
648886	2010 RW_{17}	—	August 13, 2010	Kitt Peak	Spacewatch	·	1.3 km	MPC · JPL
648887	2010 RT_{20}	—	September 3, 2010	Mount Lemmon	Mount Lemmon Survey	·	770 m	MPC · JPL
648888	2010 RZ_{22}	—	September 3, 2010	Mount Lemmon	Mount Lemmon Survey	·	2.7 km	MPC · JPL
648889	2010 RT_{33}	—	August 28, 2006	Kitt Peak	Spacewatch	·	880 m	MPC · JPL
648890	2010 RW_{35}	—	September 2, 2010	Mount Lemmon	Mount Lemmon Survey	·	2.2 km	MPC · JPL
648891	2010 RK_{47}	—	September 4, 2010	Kitt Peak	Spacewatch	RAF	620 m	MPC · JPL
648892	2010 RD_{48}	—	September 4, 2010	Kitt Peak	Spacewatch	·	1.0 km	MPC · JPL
648893	2010 RA_{50}	—	January 16, 2008	Kitt Peak	Spacewatch	·	940 m	MPC · JPL
648894	2010 RG_{65}	—	October 16, 2006	Catalina	CSS	·	1.4 km	MPC · JPL
648895	2010 RC_{66}	—	August 30, 2005	Kitt Peak	Spacewatch	H	340 m	MPC · JPL
648896	2010 RG_{67}	—	September 5, 2010	Dauban	C. Rinner, Kugel, F.	·	540 m	MPC · JPL
648897	2010 RA_{70}	—	August 23, 2003	Palomar	NEAT	·	1.1 km	MPC · JPL
648898	2010 RD_{74}	—	October 17, 2006	Kitt Peak	Spacewatch	·	1.4 km	MPC · JPL
648899	2010 RT_{74}	—	September 9, 2010	La Sagra	OAM	·	1.2 km	MPC · JPL
648900	2010 RD_{75}	—	September 6, 2010	Guidestar	Emmerich, M., Melchert, S.	EUN	1.2 km	MPC · JPL

== 648901–649000 ==
back to top

Designation			Discovery			Properties		Ref
Permanent	Provisional	Named after	Date	Site	Discoverer(s)	Category	Diam.	Ref
648901	2010 RY_{77}	—	September 9, 2010	Kitt Peak	Spacewatch	(5)	1.0 km	MPC · JPL
648902	2010 RK_{100}	—	September 10, 2010	Kitt Peak	Spacewatch	·	850 m	MPC · JPL
648903	2010 RV_{105}	—	September 10, 2010	Kitt Peak	Spacewatch	·	1.2 km	MPC · JPL
648904	2010 RU_{107}	—	November 12, 2007	Mount Lemmon	Mount Lemmon Survey	·	540 m	MPC · JPL
648905	2010 RR_{110}	—	February 9, 2005	Kitt Peak	Spacewatch	·	1.5 km	MPC · JPL
648906	2010 RY_{110}	—	September 11, 2010	Kitt Peak	Spacewatch	·	490 m	MPC · JPL
648907	2010 RP_{113}	—	March 27, 2009	Mount Lemmon	Mount Lemmon Survey	H	560 m	MPC · JPL
648908	2010 RD_{122}	—	January 10, 2007	Mount Lemmon	Mount Lemmon Survey	·	3.0 km	MPC · JPL
648909	2010 RV_{124}	—	September 12, 2010	Kitt Peak	Spacewatch	·	3.6 km	MPC · JPL
648910	2010 RW_{126}	—	September 12, 2010	Kitt Peak	Spacewatch	·	510 m	MPC · JPL
648911	2010 RH_{128}	—	September 14, 2010	Kitt Peak	Spacewatch	·	3.1 km	MPC · JPL
648912	2010 RR_{128}	—	September 18, 2003	Palomar	NEAT	·	1.1 km	MPC · JPL
648913	2010 RO_{142}	—	October 11, 2006	Palomar	NEAT	·	1.2 km	MPC · JPL
648914	2010 RK_{147}	—	September 14, 2010	Kitt Peak	Spacewatch	·	1.3 km	MPC · JPL
648915	2010 RS_{150}	—	September 15, 2010	Kitt Peak	Spacewatch	(5)	900 m	MPC · JPL
648916	2010 RW_{150}	—	September 15, 2010	Kitt Peak	Spacewatch	·	1.1 km	MPC · JPL
648917	2010 RY_{150}	—	March 10, 2008	Kitt Peak	Spacewatch	·	2.8 km	MPC · JPL
648918	2010 RD_{151}	—	September 15, 2010	Kitt Peak	Spacewatch	EUP	3.2 km	MPC · JPL
648919	2010 RF_{152}	—	September 15, 2010	Kitt Peak	Spacewatch	·	520 m	MPC · JPL
648920	2010 RE_{154}	—	September 15, 2010	Kitt Peak	Spacewatch	·	2.4 km	MPC · JPL
648921	2010 RV_{154}	—	September 27, 2006	Kitt Peak	Spacewatch	·	1.3 km	MPC · JPL
648922	2010 RU_{161}	—	November 16, 2006	Catalina	CSS	·	1.2 km	MPC · JPL
648923	2010 RE_{172}	—	September 4, 2010	Kitt Peak	Spacewatch	·	2.5 km	MPC · JPL
648924	2010 RU_{177}	—	September 11, 2010	Kitt Peak	Spacewatch	·	1.2 km	MPC · JPL
648925	2010 RP_{179}	—	February 12, 2000	Apache Point	SDSS Collaboration	·	950 m	MPC · JPL
648926	2010 RU_{181}	—	September 11, 2010	Mount Lemmon	Mount Lemmon Survey	·	2.6 km	MPC · JPL
648927	2010 RZ_{182}	—	September 14, 2010	Palomar	Palomar Transient Factory	·	1.3 km	MPC · JPL
648928	2010 RL_{183}	—	September 8, 2010	Kitt Peak	Spacewatch	·	1.7 km	MPC · JPL
648929	2010 RO_{183}	—	October 7, 2010	Catalina	CSS	·	540 m	MPC · JPL
648930	2010 RP_{188}	—	November 14, 2006	Kitt Peak	Spacewatch	·	1.0 km	MPC · JPL
648931	2010 RU_{188}	—	September 2, 2010	Mount Lemmon	Mount Lemmon Survey	·	1.1 km	MPC · JPL
648932	2010 RD_{189}	—	September 2, 2010	Mount Lemmon	Mount Lemmon Survey	EUN	1.0 km	MPC · JPL
648933	2010 RE_{190}	—	September 27, 2016	Piszkéstető	K. Sárneczky, Á. Sódor	URS	2.5 km	MPC · JPL
648934	2010 RQ_{192}	—	February 15, 2013	Haleakala	Pan-STARRS 1	·	990 m	MPC · JPL
648935	2010 RC_{198}	—	October 6, 2016	Haleakala	Pan-STARRS 1	·	2.6 km	MPC · JPL
648936	2010 RS_{207}	—	September 3, 2010	Mount Lemmon	Mount Lemmon Survey	·	2.6 km	MPC · JPL
648937	2010 RY_{212}	—	September 15, 2007	Mount Lemmon	Mount Lemmon Survey	·	600 m	MPC · JPL
648938	2010 RJ_{218}	—	September 2, 2010	Mount Lemmon	Mount Lemmon Survey	·	2.3 km	MPC · JPL
648939	2010 SX_{7}	—	March 13, 2008	Mount Lemmon	Mount Lemmon Survey	ARM	3.0 km	MPC · JPL
648940	2010 SJ_{8}	—	September 4, 2010	Mount Lemmon	Mount Lemmon Survey	·	650 m	MPC · JPL
648941	2010 SM_{13}	—	September 5, 2010	Mount Lemmon	Mount Lemmon Survey	·	1.4 km	MPC · JPL
648942	2010 SP_{17}	—	September 16, 1999	Kitt Peak	Spacewatch	·	2.3 km	MPC · JPL
648943	2010 SW_{21}	—	October 21, 2007	Mount Lemmon	Mount Lemmon Survey	·	590 m	MPC · JPL
648944	2010 SW_{27}	—	July 2, 2006	Mauna Kea	D. J. Tholen	·	1.1 km	MPC · JPL
648945	2010 SH_{30}	—	September 4, 2010	Kitt Peak	Spacewatch	·	1.0 km	MPC · JPL
648946	2010 SS_{30}	—	September 18, 2010	Mount Lemmon	Mount Lemmon Survey	·	1.1 km	MPC · JPL
648947	2010 SE_{32}	—	September 30, 2010	Mount Lemmon	Mount Lemmon Survey	(5)	860 m	MPC · JPL
648948	2010 ST_{35}	—	September 10, 2010	Kitt Peak	Spacewatch	·	510 m	MPC · JPL
648949	2010 SA_{41}	—	July 30, 2014	Kitt Peak	Spacewatch	·	1.1 km	MPC · JPL
648950	2010 SK_{44}	—	October 23, 2006	Kitt Peak	Spacewatch	·	1.1 km	MPC · JPL
648951	2010 SG_{46}	—	October 24, 2015	Mount Lemmon	Mount Lemmon Survey	GEF	1.2 km	MPC · JPL
648952	2010 SG_{56}	—	September 29, 2010	Mount Lemmon	Mount Lemmon Survey	·	2.4 km	MPC · JPL
648953	2010 SC_{58}	—	September 18, 2010	Kitt Peak	Spacewatch	·	2.4 km	MPC · JPL
648954	2010 SC_{60}	—	September 17, 2010	Mount Lemmon	Mount Lemmon Survey	·	2.2 km	MPC · JPL
648955	2010 TO_{5}	—	December 15, 2003	Kitt Peak	Spacewatch	·	1.0 km	MPC · JPL
648956	2010 TR_{10}	—	September 9, 2010	Charleston	R. Holmes	·	980 m	MPC · JPL
648957	2010 TQ_{11}	—	October 2, 2010	Pla D'Arguines	R. Ferrando, Ferrando, M.	·	820 m	MPC · JPL
648958	2010 TU_{13}	—	October 3, 2010	Kitt Peak	Spacewatch	·	790 m	MPC · JPL
648959	2010 TB_{19}	—	November 25, 2002	Palomar	NEAT	·	940 m	MPC · JPL
648960	2010 TP_{21}	—	November 17, 2006	Mount Lemmon	Mount Lemmon Survey	·	1.2 km	MPC · JPL
648961	2010 TX_{21}	—	September 17, 2010	Kitt Peak	Spacewatch	·	3.2 km	MPC · JPL
648962	2010 TN_{23}	—	November 22, 2006	Kitt Peak	Spacewatch	·	1.0 km	MPC · JPL
648963	2010 TN_{28}	—	October 2, 2010	Kitt Peak	Spacewatch	·	2.7 km	MPC · JPL
648964	2010 TV_{31}	—	September 9, 2010	Kitt Peak	Spacewatch	·	2.4 km	MPC · JPL
648965	2010 TZ_{35}	—	October 2, 2010	Kitt Peak	Spacewatch	MAS	680 m	MPC · JPL
648966	2010 TZ_{36}	—	September 16, 2010	Kitt Peak	Spacewatch	EUN	950 m	MPC · JPL
648967	2010 TC_{39}	—	October 7, 2010	Kitt Peak	Spacewatch	HYG	2.1 km	MPC · JPL
648968	2010 TJ_{41}	—	September 8, 2010	Kitt Peak	Spacewatch	EUN	1.0 km	MPC · JPL
648969	2010 TZ_{45}	—	November 1, 2006	Mount Lemmon	Mount Lemmon Survey	·	1.0 km	MPC · JPL
648970	2010 TU_{46}	—	October 5, 2010	Charleston	R. Holmes	EOS	1.6 km	MPC · JPL
648971	2010 TZ_{47}	—	September 29, 2010	Kitt Peak	Spacewatch	·	1.5 km	MPC · JPL
648972	2010 TE_{50}	—	October 2, 2010	Kitt Peak	Spacewatch	T_{j} (2.92)	3.5 km	MPC · JPL
648973	2010 TV_{61}	—	August 27, 2006	Kitt Peak	Spacewatch	MAS	690 m	MPC · JPL
648974	2010 TW_{64}	—	October 7, 2010	Mount Lemmon	Mount Lemmon Survey	·	610 m	MPC · JPL
648975	2010 TJ_{72}	—	September 10, 2010	Kitt Peak	Spacewatch	·	990 m	MPC · JPL
648976	2010 TB_{73}	—	October 8, 2010	Kitt Peak	Spacewatch	·	2.3 km	MPC · JPL
648977	2010 TF_{79}	—	December 6, 2002	Apache Point	SDSS Collaboration	·	1.0 km	MPC · JPL
648978	2010 TU_{81}	—	September 10, 2010	Mount Lemmon	Mount Lemmon Survey	·	850 m	MPC · JPL
648979	2010 TZ_{82}	—	September 30, 2006	Kitt Peak	Spacewatch	·	780 m	MPC · JPL
648980	2010 TO_{83}	—	September 10, 2010	La Sagra	OAM	·	3.0 km	MPC · JPL
648981	2010 TM_{99}	—	March 7, 2009	Mount Lemmon	Mount Lemmon Survey	·	1.5 km	MPC · JPL
648982	2010 TW_{106}	—	March 11, 2008	Kitt Peak	Spacewatch	·	2.3 km	MPC · JPL
648983	2010 TT_{110}	—	October 9, 2010	Mount Lemmon	Mount Lemmon Survey	·	950 m	MPC · JPL
648984	2010 TQ_{115}	—	March 26, 2008	Mount Lemmon	Mount Lemmon Survey	THM	2.3 km	MPC · JPL
648985	2010 TQ_{116}	—	October 20, 2006	Mount Lemmon	Mount Lemmon Survey	·	1.2 km	MPC · JPL
648986	2010 TW_{117}	—	October 9, 2010	Mount Lemmon	Mount Lemmon Survey	·	1.3 km	MPC · JPL
648987	2010 TP_{118}	—	February 26, 2009	Catalina	CSS	H	510 m	MPC · JPL
648988	2010 TT_{122}	—	October 10, 2010	Mount Lemmon	Mount Lemmon Survey	·	920 m	MPC · JPL
648989	2010 TH_{135}	—	October 11, 2010	Mount Lemmon	Mount Lemmon Survey	·	1.0 km	MPC · JPL
648990	2010 TR_{136}	—	October 11, 2010	Mount Lemmon	Mount Lemmon Survey	·	2.8 km	MPC · JPL
648991	2010 TR_{137}	—	October 11, 2010	Mount Lemmon	Mount Lemmon Survey	·	780 m	MPC · JPL
648992	2010 TF_{138}	—	March 17, 2005	Mount Lemmon	Mount Lemmon Survey	·	1.2 km	MPC · JPL
648993	2010 TR_{139}	—	September 18, 2010	Mount Lemmon	Mount Lemmon Survey	·	2.9 km	MPC · JPL
648994	2010 TA_{144}	—	November 17, 2006	Kitt Peak	Spacewatch	(5)	930 m	MPC · JPL
648995	2010 TZ_{153}	—	November 17, 2006	Mount Lemmon	Mount Lemmon Survey	MAR	780 m	MPC · JPL
648996	2010 TA_{161}	—	October 2, 2006	Mount Lemmon	Mount Lemmon Survey	(5)	960 m	MPC · JPL
648997	2010 TM_{162}	—	October 22, 2006	Kitt Peak	Spacewatch	·	960 m	MPC · JPL
648998	2010 TC_{167}	—	October 13, 2010	Catalina	CSS	·	1.6 km	MPC · JPL
648999	2010 TE_{173}	—	October 15, 2010	Socorro	LINEAR	TIR	2.7 km	MPC · JPL
649000	2010 TX_{173}	—	September 18, 2010	Mount Lemmon	Mount Lemmon Survey	EUN	980 m	MPC · JPL

back to top

== Meaning of names ==
As minor planet discoveries are confirmed, they are given a permanent number by the IAU's Minor Planet Center (MPC), and the discoverers can then submit names for them, following the IAU's naming conventions. The list below concerns those minor planets in the specified number-range that have received names, and explains the meanings of those names.

Official naming citations of newly named small Solar System bodies are approved and published in a bulletin by IAU's Working Group for Small Bodies Nomenclature (WGSBN). Before May 2021, citations were published in MPC's Minor Planet Circulars for many decades. Recent citations can also be found on the JPL Small-Body Database (SBDB). Until his death in 2016, German astronomer Lutz D. Schmadel compiled these citations into the Dictionary of Minor Planet Names (DMP) and regularly updated the collection.

Based on Paul Herget's The Names of the Minor Planets, Schmadel also researched the unclear origin of numerous asteroids, most of which had been named prior to World War II. This article incorporates text from this source, which is in the public domain: SBDB New namings may only be added to this list below after official publication as the preannouncement of names is condemned. The WGSBN publishes a comprehensive guideline for the naming rules of non-cometary small Solar System bodies.

Named minor planet	Provisional	This minor planet was named for...	Ref · Catalog
648211 Kamilhairullin	2009 RL_{38}	Kamil Hairullin, a Russian philosopher, poet and writer. A former lecturer and head of the philosophy department at Kazan Pedagogical University.	IAU · 648211
648709 Angissimo	2010 BV_{4}	Established in 1920, l'Orchestre Symphonique César Franck was renamed Angissimo in 2014 to pay tribute to Angers (France), its home city.	IAU · 648709
