= List of minor planets: 640001–641000 =

The following is a partial list of minor planets, running from minor-planet number 640001 through 641000, inclusive. The primary data for this and other partial lists is based on JPL's "Small-Body Orbital Elements" and data available from the Minor Planet Center. Critical list information is also provided by the MPC, unless otherwise specified from Lowell Observatory. A detailed description of the table's columns and additional sources are given on the main page including a complete list of every page in this series, and a statistical break-up on the dynamical classification of minor planets.

Also see the summary list of all named bodies in numerical and alphabetical order, and the corresponding naming citations for the number range of this particular list. New namings may only be added to this list after official publication, as the preannouncement of names is condemned by the Working Group for Small Bodies Nomenclature of the International Astronomical Union.

Near-Earth obj.	MBA (inner)	MBA (outer)	Centaur
Mars-crosser	MBA (middle)	Jupiter trojan	Trans-Neptunian obj.
Unclassified

== 640001–640100 ==
Designation			Discovery			Properties		Ref
Permanent	Provisional	Named after	Date	Site	Discoverer(s)	Category	Diam.	Ref
640001	1991 RY_{42}	—	May 18, 2015	Haleakala	Pan-STARRS 1	·	1.9 km	MPC · JPL
640002	1991 TT_{8}	—	October 1, 1991	Kitt Peak	Spacewatch	·	1.5 km	MPC · JPL
640003	1992 SM_{4}	—	September 24, 1992	Kitt Peak	Spacewatch	NAE	2.3 km	MPC · JPL
640004	1993 VG_{6}	—	November 9, 1993	Kitt Peak	Spacewatch	·	1.8 km	MPC · JPL
640005	1994 CU_{4}	—	February 10, 1994	Kitt Peak	Spacewatch	·	1.5 km	MPC · JPL
640006	1994 UB_{9}	—	October 28, 1994	Kitt Peak	Spacewatch	MAR	980 m	MPC · JPL
640007	1994 UJ_{13}	—	April 13, 2008	Mount Lemmon	Mount Lemmon Survey	·	2.7 km	MPC · JPL
640008	1994 VC_{6}	—	November 9, 1994	Kitt Peak	Spacewatch	·	690 m	MPC · JPL
640009	1994 YU_{4}	—	January 26, 2012	Mount Lemmon	Mount Lemmon Survey	VER	2.7 km	MPC · JPL
640010	1995 EV_{9}	—	August 10, 2007	Kitt Peak	Spacewatch	·	1.9 km	MPC · JPL
640011	1995 OM_{15}	—	July 25, 1995	Kitt Peak	Spacewatch	·	1.6 km	MPC · JPL
640012	1995 OU_{18}	—	July 29, 2000	Cerro Tololo	Deep Ecliptic Survey	EOS	2.0 km	MPC · JPL
640013	1995 PP	—	August 2, 1995	Kitt Peak	Spacewatch	·	2.8 km	MPC · JPL
640014	1995 QR_{6}	—	August 22, 1995	Kitt Peak	Spacewatch	GAL	1.5 km	MPC · JPL
640015	1995 QG_{12}	—	August 22, 1995	Kitt Peak	Spacewatch	L4	9.6 km	MPC · JPL
640016	1995 QY_{13}	—	September 17, 2006	Kitt Peak	Spacewatch	·	2.7 km	MPC · JPL
640017	1995 QA_{14}	—	August 25, 1995	Kitt Peak	Spacewatch	·	1.3 km	MPC · JPL
640018	1995 QW_{16}	—	August 31, 1995	Kitt Peak	Spacewatch	EOS	1.4 km	MPC · JPL
640019	1995 SQ_{15}	—	September 18, 1995	Kitt Peak	Spacewatch	·	920 m	MPC · JPL
640020	1995 SZ_{16}	—	September 18, 1995	Kitt Peak	Spacewatch	·	2.1 km	MPC · JPL
640021	1995 SL_{33}	—	September 21, 1995	Kitt Peak	Spacewatch	MAS	670 m	MPC · JPL
640022	1995 SE_{56}	—	September 22, 1995	Kitt Peak	Spacewatch	EOS	1.4 km	MPC · JPL
640023	1995 SA_{59}	—	September 24, 1995	Kitt Peak	Spacewatch	·	1.7 km	MPC · JPL
640024	1995 SU_{69}	—	September 18, 1995	Kitt Peak	Spacewatch	·	2.0 km	MPC · JPL
640025	1995 SY_{70}	—	September 18, 1995	Kitt Peak	Spacewatch	EOS	1.2 km	MPC · JPL
640026	1995 SO_{71}	—	September 19, 1995	Kitt Peak	Spacewatch	·	1.6 km	MPC · JPL
640027	1995 ST_{72}	—	September 22, 1995	Kitt Peak	Spacewatch	HOF	1.9 km	MPC · JPL
640028	1995 SV_{72}	—	September 29, 1995	Kitt Peak	Spacewatch	·	1.6 km	MPC · JPL
640029	1995 SN_{82}	—	September 24, 1995	Kitt Peak	Spacewatch	·	1.3 km	MPC · JPL
640030	1995 TQ_{10}	—	October 1, 1995	Kitt Peak	Spacewatch	·	590 m	MPC · JPL
640031	1995 TX_{12}	—	October 22, 1995	Kitt Peak	Spacewatch	V	510 m	MPC · JPL
640032	1995 TZ_{12}	—	October 1, 1995	Kitt Peak	Spacewatch	·	2.1 km	MPC · JPL
640033	1995 UD_{17}	—	October 17, 1995	Kitt Peak	Spacewatch	NYS	920 m	MPC · JPL
640034	1995 UJ_{30}	—	October 20, 1995	Kitt Peak	Spacewatch	·	1.6 km	MPC · JPL
640035	1995 UQ_{38}	—	October 22, 1995	Kitt Peak	Spacewatch	·	1.5 km	MPC · JPL
640036	1995 UU_{41}	—	October 23, 1995	Kitt Peak	Spacewatch	·	690 m	MPC · JPL
640037	1995 UC_{52}	—	October 21, 1995	Kitt Peak	Spacewatch	·	1.2 km	MPC · JPL
640038	1995 UT_{53}	—	September 30, 1995	Kitt Peak	Spacewatch	·	2.2 km	MPC · JPL
640039	1995 UR_{61}	—	October 24, 1995	Kitt Peak	Spacewatch	·	1.6 km	MPC · JPL
640040	1995 UA_{73}	—	October 20, 1995	Kitt Peak	Spacewatch	PHO	690 m	MPC · JPL
640041	1995 UO_{79}	—	October 24, 1995	Kitt Peak	Spacewatch	·	2.1 km	MPC · JPL
640042	1995 UE_{84}	—	October 20, 2011	Mount Lemmon	Mount Lemmon Survey	·	1.8 km	MPC · JPL
640043	1995 UF_{84}	—	October 26, 1995	Kitt Peak	Spacewatch	EOS	1.4 km	MPC · JPL
640044	1995 VH_{3}	—	October 26, 1995	Kitt Peak	Spacewatch	·	620 m	MPC · JPL
640045	1995 VC_{6}	—	November 14, 1995	Kitt Peak	Spacewatch	·	1.4 km	MPC · JPL
640046	1995 VA_{7}	—	November 14, 1995	Kitt Peak	Spacewatch	·	2.4 km	MPC · JPL
640047	1995 VQ_{14}	—	November 15, 1995	Kitt Peak	Spacewatch	EOS	1.5 km	MPC · JPL
640048	1995 WS_{44}	—	February 26, 2007	Mount Lemmon	Mount Lemmon Survey	·	720 m	MPC · JPL
640049	1995 WU_{44}	—	October 3, 2006	Mount Lemmon	Mount Lemmon Survey	·	2.6 km	MPC · JPL
640050	1996 AK_{11}	—	January 13, 1996	Kitt Peak	Spacewatch	·	1.9 km	MPC · JPL
640051	1996 AL_{11}	—	January 13, 1996	Kitt Peak	Spacewatch	·	3.1 km	MPC · JPL
640052	1996 BP_{5}	—	January 18, 1996	Kitt Peak	Spacewatch	·	2.4 km	MPC · JPL
640053	1996 CK_{6}	—	February 10, 1996	Kitt Peak	Spacewatch	·	2.7 km	MPC · JPL
640054	1996 CL_{6}	—	December 26, 2006	Kitt Peak	Spacewatch	·	2.3 km	MPC · JPL
640055	1996 FY_{9}	—	March 20, 1996	Kitt Peak	Spacewatch	KON	1.8 km	MPC · JPL
640056	1996 FF_{25}	—	December 29, 2011	Mount Lemmon	Mount Lemmon Survey	VER	2.7 km	MPC · JPL
640057	1996 GO_{7}	—	April 12, 1996	Kitt Peak	Spacewatch	(5)	900 m	MPC · JPL
640058	1996 JS_{7}	—	May 12, 1996	Kitt Peak	Spacewatch	·	1.4 km	MPC · JPL
640059	1996 RG_{8}	—	September 6, 1996	Kitt Peak	Spacewatch	·	620 m	MPC · JPL
640060	1996 RM_{8}	—	September 6, 1996	Kitt Peak	Spacewatch	·	1.2 km	MPC · JPL
640061	1996 RH_{14}	—	September 8, 1996	Kitt Peak	Spacewatch	·	1.7 km	MPC · JPL
640062	1996 RO_{20}	—	September 15, 1996	Kitt Peak	Spacewatch	L4	8.9 km	MPC · JPL
640063	1996 RK_{23}	—	September 14, 1996	Kitt Peak	Spacewatch	NYS	1.1 km	MPC · JPL
640064	1996 RG_{34}	—	April 1, 2003	Apache Point	SDSS Collaboration	L4	9.8 km	MPC · JPL
640065	1996 SM_{3}	—	September 20, 1996	Kitt Peak	Spacewatch	·	850 m	MPC · JPL
640066	1996 SS_{3}	—	September 21, 1996	Kitt Peak	Spacewatch	·	820 m	MPC · JPL
640067	1996 TK_{16}	—	October 4, 1996	Kitt Peak	Spacewatch	·	1.7 km	MPC · JPL
640068	1996 TN_{26}	—	October 7, 1996	Kitt Peak	Spacewatch	RAF	970 m	MPC · JPL
640069	1996 TP_{45}	—	October 7, 1996	Kitt Peak	Spacewatch	·	1.8 km	MPC · JPL
640070	1996 VN_{10}	—	November 4, 1996	Kitt Peak	Spacewatch	MAR	800 m	MPC · JPL
640071	1996 VE_{21}	—	November 8, 1996	Kitt Peak	Spacewatch	·	1.7 km	MPC · JPL
640072	1996 VD_{34}	—	March 10, 2016	Haleakala	Pan-STARRS 1	·	1.3 km	MPC · JPL
640073	1996 WN_{1}	—	November 18, 1996	Kitt Peak	Spacewatch	·	470 m	MPC · JPL
640074	1996 WY_{3}	—	November 12, 2001	Apache Point	SDSS Collaboration	·	2.1 km	MPC · JPL
640075	1996 XJ	—	December 1, 1996	Kitt Peak	Spacewatch	·	1.5 km	MPC · JPL
640076	1996 XY_{6}	—	December 1, 1996	Kitt Peak	Spacewatch	·	1.8 km	MPC · JPL
640077	1996 XC_{8}	—	December 1, 1996	Kitt Peak	Spacewatch	·	1.6 km	MPC · JPL
640078	1997 CB_{31}	—	October 21, 2006	Mount Lemmon	Mount Lemmon Survey	·	2.4 km	MPC · JPL
640079	1997 EP_{21}	—	March 4, 1997	Kitt Peak	Spacewatch	·	1.9 km	MPC · JPL
640080	1997 EB_{25}	—	March 7, 1997	Kitt Peak	Spacewatch	·	1.7 km	MPC · JPL
640081	1997 KZ_{2}	—	May 31, 1997	Kitt Peak	Spacewatch	·	3.5 km	MPC · JPL
640082	1997 ND_{12}	—	November 5, 2010	Mount Lemmon	Mount Lemmon Survey	·	3.7 km	MPC · JPL
640083	1997 PQ_{6}	—	December 30, 2008	Mount Lemmon	Mount Lemmon Survey	·	2.2 km	MPC · JPL
640084	1997 RO_{1}	—	September 4, 1997	Ondřejov	L. Kotková	·	1.2 km	MPC · JPL
640085	1997 SB_{9}	—	September 27, 1997	Kitt Peak	Spacewatch	·	1.3 km	MPC · JPL
640086	1997 SS_{9}	—	September 28, 1997	Kitt Peak	Spacewatch	NYS	950 m	MPC · JPL
640087	1997 SC_{19}	—	September 28, 1997	Kitt Peak	Spacewatch	·	1.3 km	MPC · JPL
640088	1997 TW_{11}	—	October 7, 1997	Xinglong	SCAP	·	3.0 km	MPC · JPL
640089	1997 TO_{23}	—	October 9, 1997	Kitt Peak	Spacewatch	·	1.3 km	MPC · JPL
640090	1997 UA_{20}	—	October 23, 1997	Kitt Peak	Spacewatch	PHO	880 m	MPC · JPL
640091	1998 BE_{29}	—	January 25, 1998	Kitt Peak	Spacewatch	·	2.3 km	MPC · JPL
640092	1998 BN_{34}	—	January 22, 1998	Kitt Peak	Spacewatch	·	880 m	MPC · JPL
640093	1998 BT_{34}	—	January 24, 1998	Kitt Peak	Spacewatch	·	1.5 km	MPC · JPL
640094	1998 DR_{24}	—	February 23, 1998	Kitt Peak	Spacewatch	·	1.1 km	MPC · JPL
640095	1998 FT_{149}	—	October 8, 2012	Kitt Peak	Spacewatch	·	2.2 km	MPC · JPL
640096	1998 FU_{149}	—	July 28, 2011	Haleakala	Pan-STARRS 1	EOS	1.6 km	MPC · JPL
640097	1998 OM_{4}	—	July 26, 1998	Kitt Peak	Spacewatch	·	740 m	MPC · JPL
640098	1998 QW_{27}	—	August 23, 1998	Kitt Peak	Spacewatch	H	430 m	MPC · JPL
640099	1998 QH_{59}	—	August 26, 1998	Kitt Peak	Spacewatch	·	2.7 km	MPC · JPL
640100	1998 RU_{81}	—	February 25, 2006	Kitt Peak	Spacewatch	·	1.9 km	MPC · JPL

== 640101–640200 ==
back to top

Designation			Discovery			Properties		Ref
Permanent	Provisional	Named after	Date	Site	Discoverer(s)	Category	Diam.	Ref
640101	1998 SX_{35}	—	September 24, 1998	Caussols	ODAS	·	830 m	MPC · JPL
640102	1998 SB_{50}	—	September 25, 1998	Kitt Peak	Spacewatch	·	1.2 km	MPC · JPL
640103	1998 SX_{177}	—	January 2, 2012	Kitt Peak	Spacewatch	·	3.3 km	MPC · JPL
640104	1998 SC_{178}	—	November 7, 2008	Mount Lemmon	Mount Lemmon Survey	·	1.7 km	MPC · JPL
640105	1998 SH_{178}	—	October 16, 2016	Haleakala	Pan-STARRS 1	(895)	3.9 km	MPC · JPL
640106	1998 SW_{178}	—	May 20, 2012	Haleakala	Pan-STARRS 1	·	950 m	MPC · JPL
640107	1998 SL_{179}	—	January 8, 2010	Mount Lemmon	Mount Lemmon Survey	(2076)	570 m	MPC · JPL
640108	1998 SO_{179}	—	November 3, 2012	Mount Lemmon	Mount Lemmon Survey	·	1.6 km	MPC · JPL
640109	1998 SR_{179}	—	October 26, 2013	Mount Lemmon	Mount Lemmon Survey	KOR	1.1 km	MPC · JPL
640110	1998 SS_{179}	—	February 9, 2014	Kitt Peak	Spacewatch	L4	7.9 km	MPC · JPL
640111	1998 SN_{180}	—	December 28, 2011	Mount Lemmon	Mount Lemmon Survey	(5)	810 m	MPC · JPL
640112	1998 SB_{181}	—	October 20, 2003	Kitt Peak	Spacewatch	·	1.5 km	MPC · JPL
640113	1998 TY_{21}	—	October 13, 1998	Kitt Peak	Spacewatch	L4	7.9 km	MPC · JPL
640114	1998 TW_{28}	—	October 15, 1998	Kitt Peak	Spacewatch	·	710 m	MPC · JPL
640115	1998 UM_{51}	—	August 29, 2005	Kitt Peak	Spacewatch	·	830 m	MPC · JPL
640116	1998 VH_{57}	—	September 30, 2010	Mount Lemmon	Mount Lemmon Survey	L4	9.3 km	MPC · JPL
640117	1998 WR_{26}	—	October 18, 1998	Kitt Peak	Spacewatch	·	1.7 km	MPC · JPL
640118	1998 WN_{29}	—	November 23, 1998	Kitt Peak	Spacewatch	·	1 km	MPC · JPL
640119	1998 WQ_{38}	—	November 15, 1998	Kitt Peak	Spacewatch	L4	7.6 km	MPC · JPL
640120	1998 WG_{40}	—	November 15, 1998	Kitt Peak	Spacewatch	·	2.1 km	MPC · JPL
640121	1998 WL_{44}	—	October 17, 1998	Kitt Peak	Spacewatch	(5)	770 m	MPC · JPL
640122	1998 WK_{46}	—	November 23, 1998	Kitt Peak	Spacewatch	·	1.1 km	MPC · JPL
640123	1998 WX_{46}	—	November 10, 2010	Mount Lemmon	Mount Lemmon Survey	L4	6.1 km	MPC · JPL
640124	1998 YV_{33}	—	December 22, 1998	Kitt Peak	Spacewatch	·	1.6 km	MPC · JPL
640125	1998 YB_{34}	—	December 3, 2007	Kitt Peak	Spacewatch	AEO	1.1 km	MPC · JPL
640126	1998 YC_{34}	—	July 8, 2014	Haleakala	Pan-STARRS 1	·	1.3 km	MPC · JPL
640127	1999 AX_{11}	—	January 7, 1999	Kitt Peak	Spacewatch	(5)	1.1 km	MPC · JPL
640128	1999 AS_{12}	—	December 26, 1998	Kitt Peak	Spacewatch	NYS	940 m	MPC · JPL
640129	1999 AU_{39}	—	September 18, 2006	Kitt Peak	Spacewatch	(5)	790 m	MPC · JPL
640130	1999 AY_{39}	—	August 23, 2017	Haleakala	Pan-STARRS 1	·	1.6 km	MPC · JPL
640131	1999 BW_{35}	—	January 23, 1999	Kitt Peak	Spacewatch	·	840 m	MPC · JPL
640132	1999 CO_{13}	—	February 14, 1999	Caussols	ODAS	·	1.2 km	MPC · JPL
640133	1999 CR_{135}	—	February 8, 1999	Kitt Peak	Spacewatch	EUN	1.1 km	MPC · JPL
640134	1999 CB_{144}	—	February 8, 1999	Mauna Kea	Anderson, J., Veillet, C.	·	1.4 km	MPC · JPL
640135	1999 CK_{160}	—	November 8, 2010	Kitt Peak	Spacewatch	·	1.4 km	MPC · JPL
640136	1999 CM_{160}	—	February 25, 2012	Mount Lemmon	Mount Lemmon Survey	·	1.5 km	MPC · JPL
640137	1999 FC_{98}	—	February 28, 2014	Mount Lemmon	Mount Lemmon Survey	·	1.7 km	MPC · JPL
640138	1999 FY_{98}	—	March 2, 2008	Kitt Peak	Spacewatch	·	1.3 km	MPC · JPL
640139	1999 FF_{99}	—	October 28, 2014	Haleakala	Pan-STARRS 1	·	1.8 km	MPC · JPL
640140	1999 FN_{99}	—	March 24, 2015	Mount Lemmon	Mount Lemmon Survey	·	2.1 km	MPC · JPL
640141	1999 FV_{99}	—	March 14, 2012	Kitt Peak	Spacewatch	·	1.5 km	MPC · JPL
640142	1999 FA_{100}	—	January 21, 2015	Haleakala	Pan-STARRS 1	·	2.4 km	MPC · JPL
640143	1999 FQ_{100}	—	December 4, 2008	Mount Lemmon	Mount Lemmon Survey	·	1.7 km	MPC · JPL
640144	1999 FA_{101}	—	February 27, 2014	Haleakala	Pan-STARRS 1	H	460 m	MPC · JPL
640145	1999 GB_{64}	—	March 31, 2003	Apache Point	SDSS Collaboration	·	2.2 km	MPC · JPL
640146	1999 HJ_{13}	—	March 11, 2007	Kitt Peak	Spacewatch	·	1.5 km	MPC · JPL
640147	1999 HK_{13}	—	October 19, 2003	Kitt Peak	Spacewatch	·	610 m	MPC · JPL
640148	1999 HL_{13}	—	November 17, 2014	Haleakala	Pan-STARRS 1	·	1 km	MPC · JPL
640149	1999 KN_{21}	—	November 1, 2013	Mount Lemmon	Mount Lemmon Survey	·	1.5 km	MPC · JPL
640150	1999 KO_{21}	—	January 31, 2006	Kitt Peak	Spacewatch	MAS	620 m	MPC · JPL
640151	1999 OW_{5}	—	May 27, 2012	Mount Lemmon	Mount Lemmon Survey	·	1.5 km	MPC · JPL
640152	1999 QY_{3}	—	July 16, 2013	Haleakala	Pan-STARRS 1	GEF	1.1 km	MPC · JPL
640153	1999 QZ_{3}	—	July 16, 2013	Haleakala	Pan-STARRS 1	GEF	950 m	MPC · JPL
640154	1999 RK_{5}	—	September 3, 1999	Kitt Peak	Spacewatch	·	2.7 km	MPC · JPL
640155	1999 RM_{251}	—	September 8, 1999	Kitt Peak	Spacewatch	·	1.6 km	MPC · JPL
640156	1999 RP_{260}	—	August 9, 2013	Haleakala	Pan-STARRS 1	·	2.0 km	MPC · JPL
640157	1999 SC_{29}	—	September 6, 2008	Kitt Peak	Spacewatch	·	1.6 km	MPC · JPL
640158	1999 TT_{21}	—	October 2, 1999	Kitt Peak	Spacewatch	·	1.5 km	MPC · JPL
640159	1999 TF_{42}	—	October 3, 1999	Kitt Peak	Spacewatch	VER	2.3 km	MPC · JPL
640160	1999 TK_{44}	—	October 3, 1999	Kitt Peak	Spacewatch	·	2.7 km	MPC · JPL
640161	1999 TX_{50}	—	October 4, 1999	Kitt Peak	Spacewatch	·	2.4 km	MPC · JPL
640162	1999 TK_{68}	—	October 9, 1999	Kitt Peak	Spacewatch	·	2.3 km	MPC · JPL
640163	1999 TO_{75}	—	October 10, 1999	Kitt Peak	Spacewatch	HOF	2.3 km	MPC · JPL
640164	1999 TQ_{141}	—	October 6, 1999	Socorro	LINEAR	·	1.8 km	MPC · JPL
640165	1999 TF_{231}	—	October 5, 1999	Catalina	CSS	·	1.2 km	MPC · JPL
640166	1999 TV_{263}	—	October 15, 1999	Kitt Peak	Spacewatch	·	1.5 km	MPC · JPL
640167	1999 TH_{302}	—	October 4, 1999	Kitt Peak	Spacewatch	·	2.6 km	MPC · JPL
640168	1999 TW_{305}	—	October 4, 1999	Kitt Peak	Spacewatch	·	1.9 km	MPC · JPL
640169	1999 TZ_{307}	—	October 4, 1999	Kitt Peak	Spacewatch	·	1.7 km	MPC · JPL
640170	1999 TY_{309}	—	October 3, 1999	Kitt Peak	Spacewatch	T_{j} (2.99) · 3:2 · SHU	3.5 km	MPC · JPL
640171	1999 TJ_{336}	—	October 6, 1999	Kitt Peak	Spacewatch	·	2.1 km	MPC · JPL
640172	1999 TS_{336}	—	October 30, 1999	Kitt Peak	Spacewatch	·	1.8 km	MPC · JPL
640173	1999 TM_{337}	—	September 27, 2016	Mount Lemmon	Mount Lemmon Survey	·	2.8 km	MPC · JPL
640174	1999 TB_{338}	—	February 14, 2013	Haleakala	Pan-STARRS 1	·	2.1 km	MPC · JPL
640175	1999 TJ_{338}	—	July 30, 2014	Haleakala	Pan-STARRS 1	·	1.3 km	MPC · JPL
640176	1999 TU_{338}	—	October 9, 2013	Kitt Peak	Spacewatch	HOF	2.0 km	MPC · JPL
640177	1999 TB_{339}	—	September 29, 2008	Mount Lemmon	Mount Lemmon Survey	·	2.0 km	MPC · JPL
640178	1999 TN_{339}	—	April 4, 2014	Haleakala	Pan-STARRS 1	·	2.8 km	MPC · JPL
640179	1999 TP_{339}	—	May 25, 2006	Mount Lemmon	Mount Lemmon Survey	·	1.2 km	MPC · JPL
640180	1999 TL_{340}	—	November 27, 2017	Mount Lemmon	Mount Lemmon Survey	·	2.7 km	MPC · JPL
640181	1999 TF_{341}	—	October 31, 1999	Kitt Peak	Spacewatch	HOF	2.1 km	MPC · JPL
640182	1999 TM_{341}	—	July 27, 2015	Haleakala	Pan-STARRS 1	·	2.5 km	MPC · JPL
640183	1999 TO_{341}	—	October 3, 2013	Haleakala	Pan-STARRS 1	HOF	2.0 km	MPC · JPL
640184	1999 TV_{341}	—	March 27, 2008	Mount Lemmon	Mount Lemmon Survey	HYG	2.3 km	MPC · JPL
640185	1999 TE_{342}	—	October 10, 2016	Mount Lemmon	Mount Lemmon Survey	·	2.9 km	MPC · JPL
640186	1999 TL_{342}	—	February 5, 2013	Kitt Peak	Spacewatch	·	2.7 km	MPC · JPL
640187	1999 UQ_{19}	—	October 30, 1999	Kitt Peak	Spacewatch	·	3.3 km	MPC · JPL
640188	1999 UL_{22}	—	October 31, 1999	Kitt Peak	Spacewatch	·	1.7 km	MPC · JPL
640189	1999 UQ_{22}	—	October 31, 1999	Kitt Peak	Spacewatch	·	2.3 km	MPC · JPL
640190	1999 UM_{56}	—	October 20, 1999	Kitt Peak	Spacewatch	AGN	1.2 km	MPC · JPL
640191	1999 UJ_{60}	—	October 31, 1999	Kitt Peak	Spacewatch	·	2.0 km	MPC · JPL
640192	1999 UJ_{65}	—	April 28, 2003	Kitt Peak	Spacewatch	·	3.9 km	MPC · JPL
640193	1999 UO_{65}	—	March 26, 2015	Mount Lemmon	Mount Lemmon Survey	·	800 m	MPC · JPL
640194	1999 UE_{66}	—	October 20, 2008	Mount Lemmon	Mount Lemmon Survey	(12739)	1.3 km	MPC · JPL
640195	1999 VH_{27}	—	November 3, 1999	Kitt Peak	Spacewatch	URS	3.6 km	MPC · JPL
640196	1999 VK_{75}	—	November 5, 1999	Kitt Peak	Spacewatch	·	1.5 km	MPC · JPL
640197	1999 VM_{84}	—	October 29, 1999	Kitt Peak	Spacewatch	·	540 m	MPC · JPL
640198	1999 VV_{115}	—	November 4, 1999	Kitt Peak	Spacewatch	·	480 m	MPC · JPL
640199	1999 VZ_{128}	—	November 9, 1999	Kitt Peak	Spacewatch	BRA	1.2 km	MPC · JPL
640200	1999 VL_{129}	—	November 11, 1999	Kitt Peak	Spacewatch	·	570 m	MPC · JPL

== 640201–640300 ==
back to top

Designation			Discovery			Properties		Ref
Permanent	Provisional	Named after	Date	Site	Discoverer(s)	Category	Diam.	Ref
640201	1999 VF_{132}	—	November 9, 1999	Kitt Peak	Spacewatch	·	1.4 km	MPC · JPL
640202	1999 VR_{137}	—	November 12, 1999	Socorro	LINEAR	THM	2.4 km	MPC · JPL
640203	1999 VC_{175}	—	November 5, 1999	Kitt Peak	Spacewatch	·	590 m	MPC · JPL
640204	1999 VK_{218}	—	November 5, 1999	Kitt Peak	Spacewatch	·	2.2 km	MPC · JPL
640205	1999 VC_{232}	—	April 3, 2011	Haleakala	Pan-STARRS 1	·	680 m	MPC · JPL
640206	1999 VH_{232}	—	November 5, 1999	Kitt Peak	Spacewatch	·	1.7 km	MPC · JPL
640207	1999 VN_{232}	—	April 30, 2005	Kitt Peak	Spacewatch	·	650 m	MPC · JPL
640208	1999 VZ_{232}	—	October 24, 2013	Mount Lemmon	Mount Lemmon Survey	AST	1.3 km	MPC · JPL
640209	1999 VB_{233}	—	November 20, 2006	Kitt Peak	Spacewatch	·	520 m	MPC · JPL
640210	1999 VG_{233}	—	September 7, 2008	Needville	Sexton, C.	·	1.8 km	MPC · JPL
640211	1999 VZ_{233}	—	October 8, 2008	Kitt Peak	Spacewatch	·	1.4 km	MPC · JPL
640212	1999 WG_{5}	—	November 28, 1999	Kitt Peak	Spacewatch	·	2.9 km	MPC · JPL
640213	1999 WT_{24}	—	January 29, 2009	Mount Lemmon	Mount Lemmon Survey	·	990 m	MPC · JPL
640214	1999 WB_{28}	—	November 2, 1999	Kitt Peak	Spacewatch	·	1.9 km	MPC · JPL
640215	1999 XH_{244}	—	December 3, 1999	Kitt Peak	Spacewatch	·	1.1 km	MPC · JPL
640216	1999 XC_{254}	—	December 12, 1999	Kitt Peak	Spacewatch	·	850 m	MPC · JPL
640217	1999 XS_{254}	—	December 12, 1999	Kitt Peak	Spacewatch	V	580 m	MPC · JPL
640218	1999 XA_{255}	—	December 12, 1999	Kitt Peak	Spacewatch	·	1.2 km	MPC · JPL
640219	1999 XW_{265}	—	October 1, 2008	Mount Lemmon	Mount Lemmon Survey	KOR	1.3 km	MPC · JPL
640220	1999 XO_{266}	—	December 5, 1999	Kitt Peak	Spacewatch	L4	9.2 km	MPC · JPL
640221	1999 XR_{266}	—	October 11, 2010	Mount Lemmon	Mount Lemmon Survey	·	2.8 km	MPC · JPL
640222	1999 YF_{20}	—	January 26, 2012	Haleakala	Pan-STARRS 1	L4	6.5 km	MPC · JPL
640223	1999 YK_{30}	—	January 24, 2015	Haleakala	Pan-STARRS 1	·	1.8 km	MPC · JPL
640224	1999 YN_{30}	—	September 15, 2009	Kitt Peak	Spacewatch	L4	6.6 km	MPC · JPL
640225	2000 AT_{224}	—	January 11, 2000	Kitt Peak	Spacewatch	(5)	1.0 km	MPC · JPL
640226	2000 AR_{258}	—	April 24, 2007	Mount Lemmon	Mount Lemmon Survey	·	2.3 km	MPC · JPL
640227	2000 AY_{258}	—	December 28, 2003	Kitt Peak	Spacewatch	(5)	1.1 km	MPC · JPL
640228	2000 AH_{259}	—	October 24, 2011	Mount Lemmon	Mount Lemmon Survey	·	860 m	MPC · JPL
640229	2000 AR_{259}	—	December 6, 2010	Mount Lemmon	Mount Lemmon Survey	L4	7.0 km	MPC · JPL
640230	2000 AZ_{259}	—	December 3, 2010	Kitt Peak	Spacewatch	L4	6.8 km	MPC · JPL
640231	2000 BW_{36}	—	January 30, 2000	Kitt Peak	Spacewatch	(5)	900 m	MPC · JPL
640232	2000 BJ_{53}	—	June 17, 2012	Mount Lemmon	Mount Lemmon Survey	·	610 m	MPC · JPL
640233	2000 CK_{73}	—	February 7, 2000	Kitt Peak	Spacewatch	·	1.3 km	MPC · JPL
640234	2000 CU_{142}	—	February 4, 2000	Kitt Peak	Spacewatch	·	620 m	MPC · JPL
640235	2000 CV_{149}	—	December 6, 2015	Mount Lemmon	Mount Lemmon Survey	·	720 m	MPC · JPL
640236	2000 CC_{151}	—	August 13, 2012	Haleakala	Pan-STARRS 1	KOR	1.1 km	MPC · JPL
640237	2000 CN_{151}	—	October 25, 2013	Kitt Peak	Spacewatch	KOR	1.2 km	MPC · JPL
640238	2000 CO_{151}	—	March 25, 2014	Mount Lemmon	Mount Lemmon Survey	·	740 m	MPC · JPL
640239	2000 CH_{153}	—	August 6, 2005	Palomar	NEAT	·	680 m	MPC · JPL
640240	2000 CL_{153}	—	January 17, 2007	Kitt Peak	Spacewatch	V	570 m	MPC · JPL
640241	2000 CN_{153}	—	April 14, 2018	Mount Lemmon	Mount Lemmon Survey	·	810 m	MPC · JPL
640242	2000 CU_{153}	—	September 17, 2012	Mount Lemmon	Mount Lemmon Survey	·	590 m	MPC · JPL
640243	2000 CJ_{154}	—	February 1, 2012	Mount Lemmon	Mount Lemmon Survey	·	1.0 km	MPC · JPL
640244	2000 CT_{155}	—	August 29, 2005	Kitt Peak	Spacewatch	·	600 m	MPC · JPL
640245	2000 CX_{155}	—	October 26, 2016	Mount Lemmon	Mount Lemmon Survey	·	640 m	MPC · JPL
640246	2000 CW_{156}	—	February 2, 2000	Kitt Peak	Spacewatch	·	550 m	MPC · JPL
640247	2000 DW_{88}	—	February 25, 2000	Kitt Peak	Spacewatch	·	1.0 km	MPC · JPL
640248	2000 EZ_{176}	—	March 3, 2000	Kitt Peak	Spacewatch	(5)	910 m	MPC · JPL
640249	2000 EU_{203}	—	March 5, 2000	Cerro Tololo	Deep Lens Survey	·	580 m	MPC · JPL
640250	2000 ES_{208}	—	April 19, 2017	Mount Lemmon	Mount Lemmon Survey	·	1.1 km	MPC · JPL
640251	2000 EB_{209}	—	January 23, 2015	Haleakala	Pan-STARRS 1	·	1.8 km	MPC · JPL
640252	2000 EA_{210}	—	September 26, 2006	Mount Lemmon	Mount Lemmon Survey	·	1.5 km	MPC · JPL
640253	2000 ED_{212}	—	December 27, 2011	Mayhill	L. Elenin	RAF	850 m	MPC · JPL
640254	2000 FD_{69}	—	March 27, 2000	Kitt Peak	Spacewatch	·	920 m	MPC · JPL
640255	2000 FF_{72}	—	September 11, 2005	Kitt Peak	Spacewatch	V	600 m	MPC · JPL
640256	2000 GZ	—	April 2, 2000	Kitt Peak	Spacewatch	(194)	1.6 km	MPC · JPL
640257	2000 GO_{37}	—	April 5, 2000	Socorro	LINEAR	·	590 m	MPC · JPL
640258	2000 GR_{188}	—	April 18, 2007	Mount Lemmon	Mount Lemmon Survey	·	410 m	MPC · JPL
640259	2000 GA_{189}	—	April 12, 2000	Kitt Peak	Spacewatch	EOS	1.8 km	MPC · JPL
640260	2000 GE_{189}	—	March 18, 2018	Haleakala	Pan-STARRS 1	V	470 m	MPC · JPL
640261	2000 HC_{46}	—	April 29, 2000	Socorro	LINEAR	·	1.7 km	MPC · JPL
640262	2000 HY_{95}	—	April 28, 2000	Kitt Peak	Spacewatch	·	840 m	MPC · JPL
640263	2000 HH_{101}	—	April 26, 2000	Kitt Peak	Spacewatch	BRG	1.6 km	MPC · JPL
640264	2000 JQ_{67}	—	May 6, 2000	Kitt Peak	Spacewatch	·	1.5 km	MPC · JPL
640265	2000 JF_{95}	—	May 13, 2011	Mount Lemmon	Mount Lemmon Survey	·	2.4 km	MPC · JPL
640266	2000 JP_{95}	—	March 1, 2012	Mount Lemmon	Mount Lemmon Survey	·	1.3 km	MPC · JPL
640267	2000 JH_{97}	—	June 18, 2013	Haleakala	Pan-STARRS 1	·	1.1 km	MPC · JPL
640268	2000 JY_{97}	—	September 2, 2014	Haleakala	Pan-STARRS 1	·	1.6 km	MPC · JPL
640269	2000 JC_{98}	—	May 27, 2009	Mount Lemmon	Mount Lemmon Survey	·	1.4 km	MPC · JPL
640270	2000 KK_{38}	—	May 24, 2000	Kitt Peak	Spacewatch	·	2.6 km	MPC · JPL
640271	2000 KK_{69}	—	May 29, 2000	Kitt Peak	Spacewatch	·	1.2 km	MPC · JPL
640272	2000 KA_{84}	—	May 24, 2000	Mauna Kea	C. Veillet, D. D. Balam	·	1.1 km	MPC · JPL
640273	2000 KR_{84}	—	August 20, 2004	Kitt Peak	Spacewatch	·	880 m	MPC · JPL
640274	2000 LQ_{2}	—	May 24, 2000	Kitt Peak	Spacewatch	·	1.4 km	MPC · JPL
640275	2000 NZ_{29}	—	January 7, 2002	Kitt Peak	Spacewatch	·	1.4 km	MPC · JPL
640276	2000 OT_{69}	—	July 29, 2000	Mauna Kea	D. J. Tholen	EOS	1.7 km	MPC · JPL
640277	2000 OF_{70}	—	January 23, 2011	Mount Lemmon	Mount Lemmon Survey	·	1.1 km	MPC · JPL
640278	2000 OJ_{70}	—	July 31, 2000	Cerro Tololo	Deep Ecliptic Survey	·	3.0 km	MPC · JPL
640279	2000 OS_{70}	—	January 29, 2014	Mount Lemmon	Mount Lemmon Survey	·	1.2 km	MPC · JPL
640280	2000 OL_{71}	—	January 28, 2007	Mount Lemmon	Mount Lemmon Survey	·	990 m	MPC · JPL
640281	2000 OQ_{71}	—	June 29, 2015	Haleakala	Pan-STARRS 1	·	800 m	MPC · JPL
640282	2000 OR_{71}	—	May 26, 2007	Mount Lemmon	Mount Lemmon Survey	MAS	660 m	MPC · JPL
640283	2000 OO_{72}	—	January 12, 2008	Kitt Peak	Spacewatch	LIX	2.5 km	MPC · JPL
640284	2000 OL_{73}	—	January 27, 2011	Mount Lemmon	Mount Lemmon Survey	·	1.2 km	MPC · JPL
640285	2000 OT_{73}	—	July 29, 2000	Cerro Tololo	Deep Ecliptic Survey	·	1.3 km	MPC · JPL
640286	2000 PS_{28}	—	May 29, 2009	Mount Lemmon	Mount Lemmon Survey	·	1.6 km	MPC · JPL
640287	2000 PW_{32}	—	February 27, 2014	Haleakala	Pan-STARRS 1	·	1.9 km	MPC · JPL
640288	2000 PE_{33}	—	December 11, 2010	Kitt Peak	Spacewatch	·	1.2 km	MPC · JPL
640289	2000 PL_{33}	—	August 18, 2009	Kitt Peak	Spacewatch	·	1.2 km	MPC · JPL
640290	2000 PO_{33}	—	September 30, 2017	Haleakala	Pan-STARRS 1	·	1.5 km	MPC · JPL
640291	2000 QC_{7}	—	August 20, 2000	Kitt Peak	Spacewatch	·	1.7 km	MPC · JPL
640292	2000 QM_{106}	—	August 29, 2000	Socorro	LINEAR	·	1.2 km	MPC · JPL
640293	2000 QZ_{236}	—	August 27, 2000	Cerro Tololo	Deep Ecliptic Survey	·	1.2 km	MPC · JPL
640294	2000 QJ_{240}	—	August 25, 2000	Cerro Tololo	Deep Ecliptic Survey	·	1.8 km	MPC · JPL
640295	2000 QR_{255}	—	August 25, 2014	Haleakala	Pan-STARRS 1	WIT	770 m	MPC · JPL
640296	2000 QS_{255}	—	January 1, 2008	Kitt Peak	Spacewatch	·	2.4 km	MPC · JPL
640297	2000 QV_{255}	—	August 28, 2013	Mount Lemmon	Mount Lemmon Survey	·	580 m	MPC · JPL
640298	2000 QB_{256}	—	December 19, 2007	Mount Lemmon	Mount Lemmon Survey	·	2.2 km	MPC · JPL
640299	2000 QC_{256}	—	May 28, 2014	Haleakala	Pan-STARRS 1	MAS	580 m	MPC · JPL
640300	2000 QH_{256}	—	February 4, 2006	Kitt Peak	Spacewatch	·	1.1 km	MPC · JPL

== 640301–640400 ==
back to top

Designation			Discovery			Properties		Ref
Permanent	Provisional	Named after	Date	Site	Discoverer(s)	Category	Diam.	Ref
640301	2000 QR_{256}	—	February 6, 2006	Mount Lemmon	Mount Lemmon Survey	·	1 km	MPC · JPL
640302	2000 QK_{257}	—	February 26, 2014	Haleakala	Pan-STARRS 1	·	2.1 km	MPC · JPL
640303	2000 QG_{259}	—	October 22, 2006	Kitt Peak	Spacewatch	·	1.7 km	MPC · JPL
640304	2000 QJ_{259}	—	November 18, 2017	Haleakala	Pan-STARRS 1	EOS	1.4 km	MPC · JPL
640305	2000 RH_{59}	—	September 7, 2000	Kitt Peak	Spacewatch	·	2.3 km	MPC · JPL
640306	2000 RF_{108}	—	October 2, 2010	Mount Lemmon	Mount Lemmon Survey	·	640 m	MPC · JPL
640307	2000 RR_{108}	—	March 21, 2002	Kitt Peak	Spacewatch	·	550 m	MPC · JPL
640308	2000 RP_{109}	—	October 26, 2009	Kitt Peak	Spacewatch	·	1.4 km	MPC · JPL
640309	2000 RY_{109}	—	January 2, 2011	Mount Lemmon	Mount Lemmon Survey	EUN	980 m	MPC · JPL
640310	2000 RG_{110}	—	December 23, 2012	Haleakala	Pan-STARRS 1	·	810 m	MPC · JPL
640311	2000 RL_{110}	—	September 23, 2000	Kitt Peak	Spacewatch	·	1.1 km	MPC · JPL
640312	2000 RJ_{111}	—	October 31, 2006	Mount Lemmon	Mount Lemmon Survey	·	2.0 km	MPC · JPL
640313	2000 RX_{111}	—	November 18, 2007	Kitt Peak	Spacewatch	·	520 m	MPC · JPL
640314	2000 SG_{21}	—	September 23, 2000	Socorro	LINEAR	JUN	840 m	MPC · JPL
640315	2000 SN_{34}	—	August 31, 2000	Socorro	LINEAR	·	1.4 km	MPC · JPL
640316	2000 SA_{35}	—	September 24, 2000	Socorro	LINEAR	·	2.4 km	MPC · JPL
640317	2000 SK_{35}	—	September 24, 2000	Socorro	LINEAR	MAS	790 m	MPC · JPL
640318	2000 SW_{53}	—	September 24, 2000	Socorro	LINEAR	·	1.0 km	MPC · JPL
640319	2000 ST_{78}	—	September 24, 2000	Kitt Peak	Spacewatch	·	1.0 km	MPC · JPL
640320	2000 SE_{79}	—	September 21, 2000	Haleakala	NEAT	·	1.2 km	MPC · JPL
640321	2000 SG_{197}	—	September 24, 2000	Socorro	LINEAR	·	940 m	MPC · JPL
640322	2000 SR_{239}	—	September 20, 2000	Kitt Peak	Spacewatch	·	1.2 km	MPC · JPL
640323	2000 SN_{264}	—	September 26, 2000	Socorro	LINEAR	·	1.5 km	MPC · JPL
640324	2000 SZ_{328}	—	September 27, 2000	Socorro	LINEAR	·	2.1 km	MPC · JPL
640325	2000 SZ_{359}	—	October 2, 2000	Socorro	LINEAR	MAS	850 m	MPC · JPL
640326	2000 SO_{370}	—	October 1, 2000	Socorro	LINEAR	·	1.1 km	MPC · JPL
640327	2000 SA_{377}	—	August 3, 2008	Siding Spring	SSS	RAF	1.0 km	MPC · JPL
640328	2000 SV_{378}	—	February 7, 2008	Kitt Peak	Spacewatch	·	2.3 km	MPC · JPL
640329	2000 SU_{380}	—	November 2, 2010	Mount Lemmon	Mount Lemmon Survey	·	540 m	MPC · JPL
640330	2000 SA_{381}	—	August 14, 2015	Haleakala	Pan-STARRS 1	·	930 m	MPC · JPL
640331	2000 SG_{381}	—	December 31, 2013	Mount Lemmon	Mount Lemmon Survey	(5)	1.0 km	MPC · JPL
640332	2000 SQ_{381}	—	September 18, 2017	Kitt Peak	Spacewatch	VER	1.9 km	MPC · JPL
640333	2000 SN_{382}	—	September 28, 2009	Kitt Peak	Spacewatch	GAL	1.2 km	MPC · JPL
640334	2000 SB_{383}	—	September 28, 2009	Kitt Peak	Spacewatch	·	1.3 km	MPC · JPL
640335	2000 SL_{383}	—	September 19, 2000	Kitt Peak	Deep Ecliptic Survey	·	1.3 km	MPC · JPL
640336	2000 SA_{385}	—	August 26, 2012	Haleakala	Pan-STARRS 1	L5	7.3 km	MPC · JPL
640337	2000 SO_{385}	—	October 26, 2013	Kitt Peak	Spacewatch	·	530 m	MPC · JPL
640338	2000 SP_{385}	—	September 24, 2017	Haleakala	Pan-STARRS 1	·	1.6 km	MPC · JPL
640339	2000 SH_{386}	—	September 3, 2013	Haleakala	Pan-STARRS 1	·	1.3 km	MPC · JPL
640340	2000 SK_{386}	—	March 31, 2009	Kitt Peak	Spacewatch	·	1.8 km	MPC · JPL
640341	2000 TR_{10}	—	October 1, 2000	Socorro	LINEAR	·	1.2 km	MPC · JPL
640342	2000 TU_{23}	—	October 1, 2000	Socorro	LINEAR	·	2.7 km	MPC · JPL
640343	2000 TH_{30}	—	October 1, 2000	Kitt Peak	Spacewatch	·	960 m	MPC · JPL
640344	2000 TH_{49}	—	October 2, 2000	Socorro	LINEAR	MAS	830 m	MPC · JPL
640345	2000 TY_{74}	—	September 21, 2011	Kitt Peak	Spacewatch	THM	2.1 km	MPC · JPL
640346	2000 TQ_{75}	—	April 1, 2003	Apache Point	SDSS Collaboration	·	2.8 km	MPC · JPL
640347	2000 TX_{75}	—	December 22, 2012	Haleakala	Pan-STARRS 1	EOS	1.8 km	MPC · JPL
640348	2000 TD_{76}	—	October 10, 2013	Kislovodsk	V. Nevski, V. Savanevych	·	630 m	MPC · JPL
640349	2000 TE_{76}	—	October 2, 2000	Kitt Peak	Spacewatch	MAS	720 m	MPC · JPL
640350	2000 TO_{77}	—	January 5, 2012	Haleakala	Pan-STARRS 1	·	2.6 km	MPC · JPL
640351	2000 TS_{77}	—	September 17, 2009	Catalina	CSS	·	1.3 km	MPC · JPL
640352	2000 TZ_{77}	—	January 10, 2014	Mount Lemmon	Mount Lemmon Survey	·	3.0 km	MPC · JPL
640353	2000 TE_{78}	—	December 10, 2012	Catalina	CSS	·	1.4 km	MPC · JPL
640354	2000 TB_{79}	—	November 29, 2005	Kitt Peak	Spacewatch	·	1.5 km	MPC · JPL
640355	2000 TG_{79}	—	June 25, 2015	Haleakala	Pan-STARRS 1	·	910 m	MPC · JPL
640356	2000 TR_{79}	—	September 23, 2011	Kitt Peak	Spacewatch	·	2.3 km	MPC · JPL
640357	2000 TV_{79}	—	January 10, 2013	Haleakala	Pan-STARRS 1	·	790 m	MPC · JPL
640358	2000 TX_{79}	—	September 28, 2009	Kitt Peak	Spacewatch	·	1.2 km	MPC · JPL
640359	2000 TJ_{80}	—	July 4, 2016	Haleakala	Pan-STARRS 1	·	2.5 km	MPC · JPL
640360	2000 TZ_{80}	—	February 3, 2009	Kitt Peak	Spacewatch	·	3.0 km	MPC · JPL
640361	2000 TR_{81}	—	September 23, 2011	Haleakala	Pan-STARRS 1	·	2.1 km	MPC · JPL
640362	2000 TV_{81}	—	September 23, 2011	Kitt Peak	Spacewatch	EOS	1.6 km	MPC · JPL
640363	2000 TY_{81}	—	January 25, 2011	Mount Lemmon	Mount Lemmon Survey	·	1.4 km	MPC · JPL
640364	2000 UE_{40}	—	October 24, 2000	Socorro	LINEAR	·	1.9 km	MPC · JPL
640365	2000 UD_{115}	—	February 9, 2008	Catalina	CSS	·	3.3 km	MPC · JPL
640366	2000 UK_{115}	—	September 2, 2011	Haleakala	Pan-STARRS 1	EOS	1.8 km	MPC · JPL
640367	2000 UV_{115}	—	November 27, 2000	Kitt Peak	Spacewatch	·	3.1 km	MPC · JPL
640368	2000 UW_{115}	—	August 14, 2016	Haleakala	Pan-STARRS 1	EOS	1.3 km	MPC · JPL
640369	2000 UZ_{115}	—	January 2, 2017	Haleakala	Pan-STARRS 1	MAS	580 m	MPC · JPL
640370	2000 VA_{1}	—	November 1, 2000	Kitt Peak	Spacewatch	PHO	740 m	MPC · JPL
640371	2000 VQ_{65}	—	November 24, 2013	Haleakala	Pan-STARRS 1	·	1.4 km	MPC · JPL
640372	2000 VC_{66}	—	September 9, 2015	Haleakala	Pan-STARRS 1	·	870 m	MPC · JPL
640373	2000 VK_{66}	—	November 14, 2013	Mount Lemmon	Mount Lemmon Survey	·	1.1 km	MPC · JPL
640374	2000 VL_{66}	—	December 23, 2012	Haleakala	Pan-STARRS 1	·	810 m	MPC · JPL
640375	2000 WX_{27}	—	November 26, 2000	Kitt Peak	Spacewatch	·	900 m	MPC · JPL
640376	2000 WZ_{27}	—	November 26, 2000	Kitt Peak	Spacewatch	MAS	610 m	MPC · JPL
640377	2000 WG_{52}	—	November 27, 2000	Kitt Peak	Spacewatch	·	3.0 km	MPC · JPL
640378	2000 WJ_{52}	—	November 27, 2000	Kitt Peak	Spacewatch	·	530 m	MPC · JPL
640379	2000 WG_{53}	—	November 27, 2000	Kitt Peak	Spacewatch	·	1.4 km	MPC · JPL
640380	2000 WC_{64}	—	November 25, 2000	Kitt Peak	Spacewatch	·	2.7 km	MPC · JPL
640381	2000 WP_{198}	—	September 20, 2007	Kitt Peak	Spacewatch	3:2 · SHU	3.9 km	MPC · JPL
640382	2000 WL_{199}	—	May 12, 2010	Kitt Peak	Spacewatch	·	1.4 km	MPC · JPL
640383	2000 WM_{199}	—	November 18, 2000	Kitt Peak	Spacewatch	·	1.0 km	MPC · JPL
640384	2000 WQ_{199}	—	May 5, 2002	Kitt Peak	Spacewatch	MAS	650 m	MPC · JPL
640385	2000 WX_{199}	—	November 28, 2000	Kitt Peak	Spacewatch	·	1.5 km	MPC · JPL
640386	2000 WY_{199}	—	October 6, 2011	Mount Lemmon	Mount Lemmon Survey	·	2.4 km	MPC · JPL
640387	2000 WJ_{200}	—	March 2, 2011	Mount Lemmon	Mount Lemmon Survey	·	1.8 km	MPC · JPL
640388	2000 WK_{200}	—	July 1, 2005	Kitt Peak	Spacewatch	·	1.8 km	MPC · JPL
640389	2000 WM_{200}	—	November 22, 2000	Kitt Peak	Spacewatch	·	740 m	MPC · JPL
640390	2000 WR_{200}	—	August 31, 2014	Haleakala	Pan-STARRS 1	·	1.6 km	MPC · JPL
640391	2000 WC_{201}	—	December 3, 2012	Mount Lemmon	Mount Lemmon Survey	·	2.8 km	MPC · JPL
640392	2000 WG_{201}	—	October 14, 2009	Mount Lemmon	Mount Lemmon Survey	·	1.4 km	MPC · JPL
640393	2000 WK_{201}	—	October 22, 2017	Mount Lemmon	Mount Lemmon Survey	·	2.3 km	MPC · JPL
640394	2000 WN_{201}	—	November 20, 2000	Apache Point	SDSS Collaboration	·	2.5 km	MPC · JPL
640395	2000 WW_{201}	—	February 7, 2011	Mount Lemmon	Mount Lemmon Survey	EUN	1.0 km	MPC · JPL
640396	2000 WH_{202}	—	August 31, 2011	Piszkéstető	K. Sárneczky	·	2.1 km	MPC · JPL
640397	2000 WT_{202}	—	January 2, 2009	Mount Lemmon	Mount Lemmon Survey	·	830 m	MPC · JPL
640398	2000 WV_{202}	—	January 28, 2017	Haleakala	Pan-STARRS 1	·	1.0 km	MPC · JPL
640399	2000 WC_{203}	—	July 12, 2013	Haleakala	Pan-STARRS 1	·	1.4 km	MPC · JPL
640400	2000 WG_{203}	—	August 20, 2015	Catalina	CSS	PHO	800 m	MPC · JPL

== 640401–640500 ==
back to top

Designation			Discovery			Properties		Ref
Permanent	Provisional	Named after	Date	Site	Discoverer(s)	Category	Diam.	Ref
640401	2000 WO_{203}	—	April 23, 2015	Haleakala	Pan-STARRS 1	·	2.5 km	MPC · JPL
640402	2000 WS_{203}	—	April 3, 2016	Haleakala	Pan-STARRS 1	·	1.3 km	MPC · JPL
640403	2000 WM_{204}	—	October 22, 2011	Mount Lemmon	Mount Lemmon Survey	·	2.1 km	MPC · JPL
640404	2000 WR_{204}	—	December 8, 2015	Mount Lemmon	Mount Lemmon Survey	V	470 m	MPC · JPL
640405	2000 WZ_{204}	—	January 7, 2006	Mount Lemmon	Mount Lemmon Survey	DOR	2.2 km	MPC · JPL
640406	2000 WF_{205}	—	April 29, 2014	Haleakala	Pan-STARRS 1	(31811)	2.2 km	MPC · JPL
640407	2000 XG	—	December 1, 2000	Kitt Peak	Spacewatch	·	2.4 km	MPC · JPL
640408	2000 XL_{15}	—	December 5, 2000	Bohyunsan	Jeon, Y.-B., Park, Y.-H.	THM	1.8 km	MPC · JPL
640409	2000 XA_{44}	—	December 6, 2000	Bohyunsan	Jeon, Y.-B., Park, Y.-H.	·	2.5 km	MPC · JPL
640410	2000 XF_{56}	—	November 17, 2014	Mount Lemmon	Mount Lemmon Survey	·	1.4 km	MPC · JPL
640411	2000 YF_{3}	—	December 18, 2000	Kitt Peak	Spacewatch	·	860 m	MPC · JPL
640412	2000 YD_{16}	—	December 21, 2000	Bohyunsan	Bohyunsan	LUT	3.2 km	MPC · JPL
640413	2000 YM_{27}	—	September 10, 2013	Haleakala	Pan-STARRS 1	·	2.2 km	MPC · JPL
640414	2000 YQ_{144}	—	October 6, 2016	Mount Lemmon	Mount Lemmon Survey	·	2.7 km	MPC · JPL
640415	2000 YY_{144}	—	January 8, 2011	Mount Lemmon	Mount Lemmon Survey	·	550 m	MPC · JPL
640416	2000 YY_{145}	—	March 4, 2013	Haleakala	Pan-STARRS 1	·	3.0 km	MPC · JPL
640417	2000 YC_{146}	—	October 21, 2017	Mount Lemmon	Mount Lemmon Survey	EUN	1.0 km	MPC · JPL
640418	2000 YG_{146}	—	May 20, 2015	Cerro Tololo	DECam	URS	2.2 km	MPC · JPL
640419	2001 BH_{70}	—	January 26, 2001	Kitt Peak	Spacewatch	EUP	3.3 km	MPC · JPL
640420	2001 BX_{79}	—	January 21, 2001	Socorro	LINEAR	·	2.0 km	MPC · JPL
640421	2001 BR_{83}	—	November 10, 2005	Kitt Peak	Spacewatch	·	2.7 km	MPC · JPL
640422	2001 BL_{84}	—	January 26, 2011	Kitt Peak	Spacewatch	·	650 m	MPC · JPL
640423	2001 BV_{84}	—	April 15, 2004	Apache Point	SDSS Collaboration	H	400 m	MPC · JPL
640424	2001 BD_{85}	—	April 18, 2009	Mount Lemmon	Mount Lemmon Survey	·	1.0 km	MPC · JPL
640425	2001 CN_{50}	—	July 19, 2015	Haleakala	Pan-STARRS 1	·	2.2 km	MPC · JPL
640426	2001 DS_{86}	—	February 27, 2001	Piszkéstető	K. Sárneczky, Derekas, A.	·	950 m	MPC · JPL
640427	2001 DW_{114}	—	November 2, 2010	Mount Lemmon	Mount Lemmon Survey	·	2.8 km	MPC · JPL
640428	2001 DO_{116}	—	August 6, 2012	Haleakala	Pan-STARRS 1	·	520 m	MPC · JPL
640429	2001 DQ_{116}	—	December 30, 2015	Haleakala	Pan-STARRS 1	·	1.7 km	MPC · JPL
640430	2001 DB_{117}	—	December 13, 2017	Haleakala	Pan-STARRS 1	·	2.7 km	MPC · JPL
640431	2001 DU_{117}	—	August 12, 2016	Haleakala	Pan-STARRS 1	·	710 m	MPC · JPL
640432	2001 DK_{119}	—	March 28, 2011	Mount Lemmon	Mount Lemmon Survey	·	510 m	MPC · JPL
640433	2001 FE_{86}	—	March 26, 2001	Cerro Tololo	Deep Lens Survey	·	550 m	MPC · JPL
640434	2001 FD_{199}	—	October 23, 2006	Mount Lemmon	Mount Lemmon Survey	·	520 m	MPC · JPL
640435	2001 FS_{199}	—	January 17, 2004	Kitt Peak	Spacewatch	·	540 m	MPC · JPL
640436	2001 FY_{203}	—	September 19, 2009	Kitt Peak	Spacewatch	·	490 m	MPC · JPL
640437	2001 FS_{219}	—	March 21, 2001	Kitt Peak	SKADS	KOR	970 m	MPC · JPL
640438	2001 FT_{219}	—	March 21, 2001	Kitt Peak	SKADS	KOR	1.0 km	MPC · JPL
640439	2001 FE_{232}	—	September 30, 2006	Mount Lemmon	Mount Lemmon Survey	·	570 m	MPC · JPL
640440	2001 FV_{243}	—	October 10, 2012	Haleakala	Pan-STARRS 1	·	2.0 km	MPC · JPL
640441	2001 FC_{245}	—	August 6, 2005	Palomar	NEAT	·	1.0 km	MPC · JPL
640442	2001 FZ_{245}	—	January 13, 2016	Haleakala	Pan-STARRS 1	·	1.2 km	MPC · JPL
640443	2001 FY_{246}	—	March 21, 2017	Haleakala	Pan-STARRS 1	·	1.1 km	MPC · JPL
640444	2001 HH_{8}	—	April 18, 2001	Kitt Peak	Spacewatch	·	2.7 km	MPC · JPL
640445	2001 JL_{11}	—	June 6, 2018	Haleakala	Pan-STARRS 1	·	1.6 km	MPC · JPL
640446	2001 KP_{32}	—	May 24, 2001	Kitt Peak	Spacewatch	·	1.1 km	MPC · JPL
640447	2001 KU_{80}	—	May 31, 2001	Palomar	NEAT	·	2.4 km	MPC · JPL
640448	2001 KV_{80}	—	April 15, 2008	Mount Lemmon	Mount Lemmon Survey	·	620 m	MPC · JPL
640449	2001 KU_{81}	—	June 27, 2014	Haleakala	Pan-STARRS 1	·	1.1 km	MPC · JPL
640450	2001 KZ_{81}	—	May 24, 2001	Cerro Tololo	Deep Ecliptic Survey	·	1.4 km	MPC · JPL
640451	2001 KC_{82}	—	September 21, 2011	Mount Lemmon	Mount Lemmon Survey	KOR	1.2 km	MPC · JPL
640452	2001 KG_{83}	—	August 22, 2014	Haleakala	Pan-STARRS 1	·	710 m	MPC · JPL
640453	2001 KL_{85}	—	April 30, 2009	Mount Lemmon	Mount Lemmon Survey	H	380 m	MPC · JPL
640454	2001 KY_{85}	—	May 23, 2001	Cerro Tololo	Deep Ecliptic Survey	EOS	1.4 km	MPC · JPL
640455	2001 KJ_{86}	—	September 17, 2006	Kitt Peak	Spacewatch	·	1.1 km	MPC · JPL
640456	2001 KQ_{86}	—	October 16, 1998	Kitt Peak	Spacewatch	·	1.1 km	MPC · JPL
640457	2001 KK_{87}	—	July 18, 2013	Haleakala	Pan-STARRS 1	·	2.1 km	MPC · JPL
640458	2001 LC_{20}	—	February 14, 2004	Kitt Peak	Spacewatch	·	700 m	MPC · JPL
640459	2001 OB_{17}	—	July 13, 2001	Palomar	NEAT	·	1.2 km	MPC · JPL
640460	2001 OP_{26}	—	July 10, 2001	Palomar	NEAT	·	1.3 km	MPC · JPL
640461	2001 OC_{38}	—	July 20, 2001	Palomar	NEAT	(5)	1.2 km	MPC · JPL
640462	2001 OO_{40}	—	July 20, 2001	Palomar	NEAT	(1547)	1.8 km	MPC · JPL
640463	2001 OR_{59}	—	June 26, 2001	Kitt Peak	Spacewatch	·	2.1 km	MPC · JPL
640464	2001 OY_{64}	—	November 14, 2012	Mount Lemmon	Mount Lemmon Survey	·	600 m	MPC · JPL
640465	2001 OH_{66}	—	July 22, 2001	Palomar	NEAT	·	1.8 km	MPC · JPL
640466	2001 OY_{90}	—	July 27, 2001	Anderson Mesa	LONEOS	·	1.4 km	MPC · JPL
640467	2001 OQ_{95}	—	July 29, 2001	Palomar	NEAT	H	540 m	MPC · JPL
640468	2001 OP_{108}	—	July 23, 2001	Mauna Kea	D. J. Tholen, J. Lambert	H	520 m	MPC · JPL
640469	2001 OG_{114}	—	January 15, 2008	Mount Lemmon	Mount Lemmon Survey	·	1.6 km	MPC · JPL
640470	2001 OX_{114}	—	January 29, 2011	Kitt Peak	Spacewatch	NYS	720 m	MPC · JPL
640471	2001 OA_{115}	—	July 25, 2001	Palomar	NEAT	·	890 m	MPC · JPL
640472	2001 OH_{115}	—	July 22, 2001	Palomar	NEAT	·	1.1 km	MPC · JPL
640473	2001 OL_{115}	—	December 6, 2010	Mount Lemmon	Mount Lemmon Survey	·	1.1 km	MPC · JPL
640474	2001 PK_{5}	—	August 10, 2001	Palomar	NEAT	·	2.7 km	MPC · JPL
640475	2001 PY_{27}	—	August 13, 2001	Haleakala	NEAT	·	1.7 km	MPC · JPL
640476	2001 PB_{31}	—	August 10, 2001	Palomar	NEAT	·	830 m	MPC · JPL
640477	2001 PA_{32}	—	August 10, 2001	Palomar	NEAT	·	1.4 km	MPC · JPL
640478	2001 PE_{36}	—	August 1, 2001	Palomar	NEAT	JUN	1.4 km	MPC · JPL
640479	2001 PY_{43}	—	August 14, 2001	Haleakala	NEAT	·	500 m	MPC · JPL
640480	2001 PO_{55}	—	August 14, 2001	Haleakala	NEAT	·	2.6 km	MPC · JPL
640481	2001 PS_{56}	—	August 14, 2001	Haleakala	NEAT	·	890 m	MPC · JPL
640482	2001 QC_{45}	—	August 14, 2001	Haleakala	NEAT	·	1.6 km	MPC · JPL
640483	2001 QD_{50}	—	August 12, 2001	Haleakala	NEAT	NYS	1.2 km	MPC · JPL
640484	2001 QM_{107}	—	August 11, 2001	Palomar	NEAT	PHO	780 m	MPC · JPL
640485	2001 QW_{110}	—	August 24, 2001	Ondřejov	P. Pravec, P. Kušnirák	·	1.6 km	MPC · JPL
640486	2001 QS_{172}	—	August 25, 2001	Socorro	LINEAR	·	1.4 km	MPC · JPL
640487	2001 QQ_{196}	—	August 12, 2001	Haleakala	NEAT	·	1.1 km	MPC · JPL
640488	2001 QO_{212}	—	August 12, 2001	Palomar	NEAT	·	1.3 km	MPC · JPL
640489	2001 QN_{225}	—	August 17, 2001	Palomar	NEAT	·	1.5 km	MPC · JPL
640490	2001 QY_{227}	—	August 24, 2001	Anderson Mesa	LONEOS	·	1.3 km	MPC · JPL
640491	2001 QC_{229}	—	August 10, 2001	Palomar	NEAT	·	2.1 km	MPC · JPL
640492	2001 QL_{253}	—	August 25, 2001	Socorro	LINEAR	MAR	920 m	MPC · JPL
640493	2001 QT_{273}	—	August 16, 2001	Palomar	NEAT	·	1.6 km	MPC · JPL
640494	2001 QL_{278}	—	August 19, 2001	Socorro	LINEAR	·	1.2 km	MPC · JPL
640495	2001 QY_{282}	—	August 18, 2001	Kvistaberg	Uppsala-DLR Asteroid Survey	·	1.7 km	MPC · JPL
640496	2001 QC_{303}	—	August 19, 2001	Cerro Tololo	Deep Ecliptic Survey	·	2.0 km	MPC · JPL
640497	2001 QT_{309}	—	August 19, 2001	Cerro Tololo	Deep Ecliptic Survey	EOS	1.4 km	MPC · JPL
640498	2001 QX_{313}	—	August 22, 2001	Kitt Peak	Spacewatch	·	720 m	MPC · JPL
640499	2001 QR_{335}	—	August 20, 2001	Cerro Tololo	Deep Ecliptic Survey	·	800 m	MPC · JPL
640500	2001 QT_{335}	—	August 24, 2001	Kitt Peak	Spacewatch	·	1.7 km	MPC · JPL

== 640501–640600 ==
back to top

Designation			Discovery			Properties		Ref
Permanent	Provisional	Named after	Date	Site	Discoverer(s)	Category	Diam.	Ref
640501	2001 QU_{335}	—	October 7, 2014	Haleakala	Pan-STARRS 1	·	1.5 km	MPC · JPL
640502	2001 QE_{336}	—	August 26, 2001	Palomar	NEAT	·	870 m	MPC · JPL
640503	2001 QO_{336}	—	October 27, 2005	Anderson Mesa	LONEOS	·	680 m	MPC · JPL
640504	2001 QR_{336}	—	November 5, 2010	Kitt Peak	Spacewatch	·	1.0 km	MPC · JPL
640505	2001 QT_{336}	—	March 5, 2013	Haleakala	Pan-STARRS 1	·	1.2 km	MPC · JPL
640506	2001 QV_{336}	—	February 10, 2010	Kitt Peak	Spacewatch	·	880 m	MPC · JPL
640507	2001 QY_{336}	—	October 21, 2012	Kitt Peak	Spacewatch	·	710 m	MPC · JPL
640508	2001 QB_{337}	—	August 27, 2001	Kitt Peak	Spacewatch	·	1.4 km	MPC · JPL
640509	2001 QG_{337}	—	August 22, 2001	Kitt Peak	Spacewatch	·	1.1 km	MPC · JPL
640510	2001 QP_{337}	—	March 12, 2016	Haleakala	Pan-STARRS 1	MAR	950 m	MPC · JPL
640511	2001 QC_{338}	—	March 6, 2014	Mount Lemmon	Mount Lemmon Survey	·	1.3 km	MPC · JPL
640512	2001 QY_{338}	—	May 24, 2014	Mount Lemmon	Mount Lemmon Survey	·	2.0 km	MPC · JPL
640513	2001 QF_{339}	—	August 27, 2001	Kitt Peak	Spacewatch	·	710 m	MPC · JPL
640514	2001 RX_{2}	—	August 24, 2001	Socorro	LINEAR	·	1.5 km	MPC · JPL
640515	2001 RV_{22}	—	September 7, 2001	Socorro	LINEAR	·	820 m	MPC · JPL
640516	2001 RA_{37}	—	August 27, 2001	Anderson Mesa	LONEOS	·	1.6 km	MPC · JPL
640517	2001 RK_{50}	—	August 16, 2001	Palomar	NEAT	·	780 m	MPC · JPL
640518	2001 RF_{96}	—	September 12, 2001	Kitt Peak	Spacewatch	·	1.4 km	MPC · JPL
640519	2001 RB_{127}	—	August 25, 2001	Palomar	NEAT	·	1.6 km	MPC · JPL
640520	2001 RM_{128}	—	August 1, 2001	Palomar	NEAT	·	1.4 km	MPC · JPL
640521	2001 RN_{133}	—	September 12, 2001	Socorro	LINEAR	·	1.2 km	MPC · JPL
640522	2001 RV_{143}	—	September 12, 2001	Kitt Peak	Deep Ecliptic Survey	cubewano (cold)	136 km	MPC · JPL
640523	2001 RE_{155}	—	September 12, 2001	Socorro	LINEAR	·	1.5 km	MPC · JPL
640524	2001 RJ_{156}	—	January 28, 2014	Mount Lemmon	Mount Lemmon Survey	·	1.9 km	MPC · JPL
640525	2001 RT_{156}	—	March 12, 2014	Haleakala	Pan-STARRS 1	·	810 m	MPC · JPL
640526	2001 RK_{157}	—	November 13, 2012	Kitt Peak	Spacewatch	NYS	660 m	MPC · JPL
640527	2001 RQ_{157}	—	January 17, 2004	Palomar	NEAT	·	1.6 km	MPC · JPL
640528	2001 RN_{158}	—	September 11, 2001	Kitt Peak	Spacewatch	·	2.3 km	MPC · JPL
640529	2001 SL_{42}	—	July 26, 2001	Palomar	NEAT	·	1.5 km	MPC · JPL
640530	2001 SR_{87}	—	September 20, 2001	Socorro	LINEAR	·	3.1 km	MPC · JPL
640531	2001 SX_{100}	—	September 20, 2001	Socorro	LINEAR	·	1.2 km	MPC · JPL
640532	2001 SQ_{152}	—	September 17, 2001	Socorro	LINEAR	·	1.1 km	MPC · JPL
640533	2001 SC_{160}	—	September 17, 2001	Socorro	LINEAR	·	1.4 km	MPC · JPL
640534	2001 SV_{184}	—	September 11, 2001	Anderson Mesa	LONEOS	·	580 m	MPC · JPL
640535	2001 SD_{211}	—	September 19, 2001	Socorro	LINEAR	·	1.2 km	MPC · JPL
640536	2001 SA_{219}	—	September 19, 2001	Socorro	LINEAR	·	1.8 km	MPC · JPL
640537	2001 SE_{236}	—	September 19, 2001	Socorro	LINEAR	·	1.4 km	MPC · JPL
640538	2001 SJ_{259}	—	September 20, 2001	Socorro	LINEAR	H	470 m	MPC · JPL
640539	2001 SF_{284}	—	August 25, 2001	Palomar	NEAT	·	1.3 km	MPC · JPL
640540	2001 SQ_{284}	—	September 22, 2001	Kitt Peak	Spacewatch	V	680 m	MPC · JPL
640541	2001 SD_{287}	—	September 22, 2001	Palomar	NEAT	·	3.3 km	MPC · JPL
640542	2001 SH_{290}	—	July 25, 2001	Palomar	NEAT	·	2.7 km	MPC · JPL
640543	2001 SK_{292}	—	August 12, 2001	Palomar	NEAT	·	2.9 km	MPC · JPL
640544	2001 SF_{298}	—	August 25, 2001	Kitt Peak	Spacewatch	·	1.2 km	MPC · JPL
640545	2001 SD_{305}	—	September 20, 2001	Socorro	LINEAR	·	900 m	MPC · JPL
640546	2001 SG_{308}	—	September 21, 2001	Socorro	LINEAR	·	970 m	MPC · JPL
640547	2001 SQ_{327}	—	September 18, 2001	Anderson Mesa	LONEOS	MAS	640 m	MPC · JPL
640548	2001 SP_{329}	—	September 19, 2001	Socorro	LINEAR	(5)	1.1 km	MPC · JPL
640549	2001 SZ_{333}	—	September 19, 2001	Kitt Peak	Spacewatch	MAS	530 m	MPC · JPL
640550	2001 SB_{334}	—	September 19, 2001	Kitt Peak	Spacewatch	·	690 m	MPC · JPL
640551	2001 SH_{338}	—	September 20, 2001	Socorro	LINEAR	·	510 m	MPC · JPL
640552	2001 SP_{354}	—	September 19, 2001	Palomar	NEAT	·	1.7 km	MPC · JPL
640553	2001 SH_{357}	—	December 2, 2010	Kitt Peak	Spacewatch	·	1.3 km	MPC · JPL
640554	2001 SZ_{357}	—	April 11, 2008	Kitt Peak	Spacewatch	ADE	1.8 km	MPC · JPL
640555	2001 SA_{358}	—	February 20, 2014	Mount Lemmon	Mount Lemmon Survey	·	1.8 km	MPC · JPL
640556	2001 SN_{358}	—	October 16, 2012	Mount Lemmon	Mount Lemmon Survey	EOS	1.5 km	MPC · JPL
640557	2001 SV_{358}	—	November 7, 2007	Kitt Peak	Spacewatch	·	1.6 km	MPC · JPL
640558	2001 SU_{359}	—	January 25, 2014	Haleakala	Pan-STARRS 1	·	2.2 km	MPC · JPL
640559	2001 SN_{360}	—	March 11, 2011	Kitt Peak	Spacewatch	NYS	860 m	MPC · JPL
640560	2001 SO_{360}	—	March 18, 2018	Haleakala	Pan-STARRS 1	V	530 m	MPC · JPL
640561	2001 SU_{360}	—	June 12, 2011	Mount Lemmon	Mount Lemmon Survey	·	2.3 km	MPC · JPL
640562	2001 SV_{360}	—	February 28, 2014	Haleakala	Pan-STARRS 1	·	1.6 km	MPC · JPL
640563	2001 SF_{361}	—	June 17, 2009	Mount Lemmon	Mount Lemmon Survey	KON	2.3 km	MPC · JPL
640564	2001 SJ_{361}	—	December 5, 2012	Mount Lemmon	Mount Lemmon Survey	·	2.0 km	MPC · JPL
640565	2001 SB_{362}	—	September 19, 2014	Haleakala	Pan-STARRS 1	·	1.0 km	MPC · JPL
640566	2001 SC_{362}	—	November 29, 2014	Kitt Peak	Spacewatch	·	1.3 km	MPC · JPL
640567	2001 SD_{362}	—	July 9, 2013	Haleakala	Pan-STARRS 1	·	1.3 km	MPC · JPL
640568	2001 SL_{362}	—	November 18, 2007	Mount Lemmon	Mount Lemmon Survey	·	1.4 km	MPC · JPL
640569	2001 SN_{362}	—	June 20, 2013	Haleakala	Pan-STARRS 1	·	1.2 km	MPC · JPL
640570	2001 SV_{362}	—	February 10, 2016	Haleakala	Pan-STARRS 1	MAR	660 m	MPC · JPL
640571	2001 SH_{365}	—	July 26, 2011	Haleakala	Pan-STARRS 1	·	1.5 km	MPC · JPL
640572	2001 TU_{6}	—	October 10, 2001	Palomar	NEAT	ERI	1.3 km	MPC · JPL
640573	2001 TV_{6}	—	October 10, 2001	Palomar	NEAT	ADE	1.8 km	MPC · JPL
640574	2001 TS_{50}	—	August 20, 2001	Palomar	NEAT	(1547)	1.5 km	MPC · JPL
640575	2001 TS_{61}	—	October 10, 2001	Palomar	NEAT	·	880 m	MPC · JPL
640576	2001 TM_{132}	—	August 16, 2001	Palomar	NEAT	·	1.6 km	MPC · JPL
640577	2001 TX_{152}	—	October 10, 2001	Palomar	NEAT	·	2.9 km	MPC · JPL
640578	2001 TU_{157}	—	May 24, 2001	Cerro Tololo	Deep Ecliptic Survey	·	1.1 km	MPC · JPL
640579	2001 TH_{205}	—	September 22, 2001	Palomar	NEAT	T_{j} (2.94)	3.1 km	MPC · JPL
640580	2001 TT_{218}	—	October 14, 2001	Anderson Mesa	LONEOS	·	1.2 km	MPC · JPL
640581	2001 TK_{220}	—	October 14, 2001	Socorro	LINEAR	·	2.4 km	MPC · JPL
640582	2001 TY_{220}	—	October 14, 2001	Socorro	LINEAR	BAR	1.0 km	MPC · JPL
640583	2001 TT_{223}	—	October 14, 2001	Socorro	LINEAR	·	1.8 km	MPC · JPL
640584	2001 TY_{231}	—	October 15, 2001	Kitt Peak	Spacewatch	·	1.9 km	MPC · JPL
640585	2001 TP_{260}	—	October 14, 2001	Apache Point	SDSS Collaboration	·	1.3 km	MPC · JPL
640586	2001 TP_{261}	—	November 11, 2001	Kitt Peak	Spacewatch	·	1.3 km	MPC · JPL
640587	2001 TS_{261}	—	October 15, 2001	Palomar	NEAT	·	1.6 km	MPC · JPL
640588	2001 TJ_{262}	—	September 21, 2001	Apache Point	SDSS	·	1.3 km	MPC · JPL
640589	2001 TD_{265}	—	October 14, 2001	Apache Point	SDSS Collaboration	·	1.6 km	MPC · JPL
640590	2001 TF_{265}	—	October 14, 2001	Apache Point	SDSS Collaboration	·	800 m	MPC · JPL
640591	2001 TL_{265}	—	August 27, 2016	Haleakala	Pan-STARRS 1	·	1.9 km	MPC · JPL
640592	2001 TO_{266}	—	February 26, 2014	Haleakala	Pan-STARRS 1	V	460 m	MPC · JPL
640593	2001 TA_{267}	—	February 6, 2016	Haleakala	Pan-STARRS 1	·	1.2 km	MPC · JPL
640594	2001 TX_{267}	—	September 4, 2008	Kitt Peak	Spacewatch	·	690 m	MPC · JPL
640595	2001 TW_{268}	—	October 22, 2012	Kitt Peak	Spacewatch	·	1.4 km	MPC · JPL
640596	2001 TG_{269}	—	September 17, 2006	Kitt Peak	Spacewatch	·	1.5 km	MPC · JPL
640597	2001 TH_{269}	—	May 30, 2016	Haleakala	Pan-STARRS 1	·	1.6 km	MPC · JPL
640598	2001 TS_{269}	—	October 15, 2001	Kitt Peak	Spacewatch	·	1.8 km	MPC · JPL
640599	2001 TV_{269}	—	October 14, 2001	Kitt Peak	Spacewatch	EOS	1.4 km	MPC · JPL
640600	2001 UG_{7}	—	October 10, 2001	Palomar	NEAT	·	1.2 km	MPC · JPL

== 640601–640700 ==
back to top

Designation			Discovery			Properties		Ref
Permanent	Provisional	Named after	Date	Site	Discoverer(s)	Category	Diam.	Ref
640601	2001 UH_{25}	—	August 28, 2001	Palomar	NEAT	·	2.4 km	MPC · JPL
640602	2001 UW_{29}	—	October 16, 2001	Socorro	LINEAR	·	1.5 km	MPC · JPL
640603	2001 UX_{39}	—	September 21, 2001	Socorro	LINEAR	·	2.0 km	MPC · JPL
640604	2001 UH_{56}	—	October 17, 2001	Socorro	LINEAR	·	860 m	MPC · JPL
640605	2001 UK_{74}	—	October 10, 2001	Palomar	NEAT	·	1.1 km	MPC · JPL
640606	2001 UQ_{90}	—	October 21, 2001	Kitt Peak	Spacewatch	·	730 m	MPC · JPL
640607	2001 UG_{102}	—	October 20, 2001	Socorro	LINEAR	·	1.5 km	MPC · JPL
640608	2001 UK_{105}	—	October 10, 2001	Palomar	NEAT	·	3.1 km	MPC · JPL
640609	2001 UT_{137}	—	September 19, 2001	Socorro	LINEAR	·	1.9 km	MPC · JPL
640610	2001 UY_{146}	—	October 23, 2001	Socorro	LINEAR	·	760 m	MPC · JPL
640611	2001 UU_{150}	—	October 23, 2001	Socorro	LINEAR	·	1.9 km	MPC · JPL
640612	2001 UJ_{185}	—	October 17, 2001	Palomar	NEAT	·	2.9 km	MPC · JPL
640613	2001 UW_{189}	—	September 28, 2001	Palomar	NEAT	·	1.5 km	MPC · JPL
640614	2001 UM_{190}	—	September 22, 2001	Kitt Peak	Spacewatch	EOS	1.6 km	MPC · JPL
640615	2001 UV_{195}	—	October 16, 2001	Kitt Peak	Spacewatch	·	2.4 km	MPC · JPL
640616	2001 UQ_{211}	—	October 21, 2001	Socorro	LINEAR	·	1.2 km	MPC · JPL
640617	2001 UW_{215}	—	October 23, 2001	Kitt Peak	Spacewatch	·	800 m	MPC · JPL
640618	2001 UJ_{219}	—	October 26, 2001	Palomar	NEAT	TIR	2.6 km	MPC · JPL
640619	2001 US_{228}	—	October 20, 2001	Palomar	NEAT	HNS	1.3 km	MPC · JPL
640620	2001 UB_{229}	—	October 21, 2001	Palomar	NEAT	KON	2.2 km	MPC · JPL
640621	2001 UB_{232}	—	September 20, 2008	Catalina	CSS	·	800 m	MPC · JPL
640622	2001 UJ_{233}	—	February 26, 2014	Haleakala	Pan-STARRS 1	EOS	1.4 km	MPC · JPL
640623	2001 UT_{233}	—	October 18, 2001	Kitt Peak	Spacewatch	·	2.5 km	MPC · JPL
640624	2001 UV_{233}	—	November 13, 2010	Mount Lemmon	Mount Lemmon Survey	·	1.3 km	MPC · JPL
640625	2001 UG_{234}	—	October 9, 2012	Mount Lemmon	Mount Lemmon Survey	·	2.3 km	MPC · JPL
640626	2001 UN_{234}	—	November 20, 2007	Mount Lemmon	Mount Lemmon Survey	EOS	1.6 km	MPC · JPL
640627	2001 UU_{234}	—	October 16, 2001	Kitt Peak	Spacewatch	·	1.8 km	MPC · JPL
640628	2001 UX_{234}	—	October 20, 2012	Mount Lemmon	Mount Lemmon Survey	·	2.5 km	MPC · JPL
640629	2001 UG_{235}	—	August 13, 2004	Palomar	NEAT	·	470 m	MPC · JPL
640630	2001 UO_{235}	—	April 2, 2005	Kitt Peak	Spacewatch	·	2.0 km	MPC · JPL
640631	2001 UM_{236}	—	September 21, 2001	Kitt Peak	Spacewatch	·	830 m	MPC · JPL
640632	2001 UM_{237}	—	October 20, 2001	Palomar	NEAT	·	1.1 km	MPC · JPL
640633	2001 UR_{237}	—	October 18, 2001	Palomar	NEAT	MAS	550 m	MPC · JPL
640634	2001 UE_{238}	—	November 26, 2014	Haleakala	Pan-STARRS 1	·	1.0 km	MPC · JPL
640635	2001 UH_{238}	—	October 21, 2001	Kitt Peak	Spacewatch	·	2.7 km	MPC · JPL
640636	2001 UM_{238}	—	September 25, 2012	Kitt Peak	Spacewatch	TIR	1.9 km	MPC · JPL
640637	2001 UF_{239}	—	October 8, 2012	Kitt Peak	Spacewatch	·	2.3 km	MPC · JPL
640638	2001 UN_{239}	—	August 14, 2015	Haleakala	Pan-STARRS 1	V	480 m	MPC · JPL
640639	2001 UP_{240}	—	October 18, 2001	Palomar	NEAT	·	1.9 km	MPC · JPL
640640	2001 UW_{240}	—	October 18, 2001	Kitt Peak	Spacewatch	·	2.6 km	MPC · JPL
640641	2001 VJ_{1}	—	November 11, 2001	Kitt Peak	Spacewatch	·	2.8 km	MPC · JPL
640642	2001 VU_{6}	—	October 21, 2001	Socorro	LINEAR	·	1.7 km	MPC · JPL
640643	2001 VM_{72}	—	November 12, 2001	Kitt Peak	Spacewatch	·	1.4 km	MPC · JPL
640644	2001 VT_{89}	—	November 12, 2001	Socorro	LINEAR	·	1.8 km	MPC · JPL
640645	2001 VB_{135}	—	August 29, 2006	Kitt Peak	Spacewatch	·	2.1 km	MPC · JPL
640646	2001 VK_{135}	—	November 12, 2001	Apache Point	SDSS Collaboration	·	2.1 km	MPC · JPL
640647	2001 VL_{135}	—	November 11, 2001	Apache Point	SDSS Collaboration	·	2.1 km	MPC · JPL
640648	2001 VQ_{135}	—	October 11, 2012	Haleakala	Pan-STARRS 1	·	2.5 km	MPC · JPL
640649	2001 VW_{135}	—	April 23, 2015	Haleakala	Pan-STARRS 1	·	1.8 km	MPC · JPL
640650	2001 VZ_{135}	—	November 12, 2001	Apache Point	SDSS Collaboration	EOS	1.6 km	MPC · JPL
640651	2001 VS_{136}	—	September 26, 2012	Haleakala	Pan-STARRS 1	·	2.3 km	MPC · JPL
640652	2001 VZ_{136}	—	September 11, 2014	Haleakala	Pan-STARRS 1	HNS	1.1 km	MPC · JPL
640653	2001 VF_{137}	—	September 9, 2015	Haleakala	Pan-STARRS 1	·	670 m	MPC · JPL
640654	2001 VZ_{137}	—	January 17, 2007	Kitt Peak	Spacewatch	·	1.0 km	MPC · JPL
640655	2001 WZ	—	November 16, 2001	Kitt Peak	Spacewatch	·	2.4 km	MPC · JPL
640656	2001 WO_{3}	—	November 16, 2001	Kitt Peak	Spacewatch	·	1.7 km	MPC · JPL
640657	2001 WV_{3}	—	November 17, 2001	Kitt Peak	Spacewatch	·	1.3 km	MPC · JPL
640658	2001 WQ_{6}	—	November 17, 2001	Socorro	LINEAR	ADE	1.8 km	MPC · JPL
640659	2001 WF_{22}	—	November 16, 2001	Kitt Peak	Deep Lens Survey	·	1.4 km	MPC · JPL
640660	2001 WV_{31}	—	November 17, 2001	Socorro	LINEAR	·	1.3 km	MPC · JPL
640661	2001 WE_{58}	—	November 19, 2001	Socorro	LINEAR	·	1.2 km	MPC · JPL
640662	2001 WW_{58}	—	November 11, 2001	Kitt Peak	Spacewatch	·	2.3 km	MPC · JPL
640663	2001 WJ_{73}	—	November 20, 2001	Socorro	LINEAR	·	600 m	MPC · JPL
640664	2001 WM_{76}	—	November 20, 2001	Socorro	LINEAR	MAS	500 m	MPC · JPL
640665	2001 WP_{80}	—	November 20, 2001	Socorro	LINEAR	·	820 m	MPC · JPL
640666	2001 WW_{95}	—	November 20, 2001	Kitt Peak	Spacewatch	·	760 m	MPC · JPL
640667	2001 WY_{96}	—	November 18, 2001	Kitt Peak	Spacewatch	·	1.3 km	MPC · JPL
640668	2001 WW_{104}	—	November 18, 2001	Kitt Peak	Spacewatch	·	820 m	MPC · JPL
640669	2001 WX_{104}	—	October 2, 2006	Mount Lemmon	Mount Lemmon Survey	·	2.0 km	MPC · JPL
640670	2001 WZ_{104}	—	December 11, 2012	Mount Lemmon	Mount Lemmon Survey	·	1.8 km	MPC · JPL
640671	2001 WF_{105}	—	April 18, 2013	Mount Lemmon	Mount Lemmon Survey	JUN	1.0 km	MPC · JPL
640672	2001 WK_{105}	—	October 27, 2012	Mount Lemmon	Mount Lemmon Survey	·	930 m	MPC · JPL
640673	2001 WS_{105}	—	October 18, 2012	Mount Lemmon	Mount Lemmon Survey	(5651)	2.6 km	MPC · JPL
640674	2001 WV_{105}	—	November 21, 2001	Apache Point	SDSS Collaboration	·	2.8 km	MPC · JPL
640675	2001 WW_{105}	—	August 30, 2016	Mount Lemmon	Mount Lemmon Survey	·	3.5 km	MPC · JPL
640676	2001 WF_{106}	—	October 27, 2012	Mount Lemmon	Mount Lemmon Survey	·	860 m	MPC · JPL
640677	2001 WV_{106}	—	November 21, 2001	Kitt Peak	Spacewatch	·	1.9 km	MPC · JPL
640678	2001 XO_{127}	—	December 14, 2001	Socorro	LINEAR	·	2.3 km	MPC · JPL
640679	2001 XW_{129}	—	December 14, 2001	Socorro	LINEAR	·	2.0 km	MPC · JPL
640680	2001 XU_{237}	—	December 15, 2001	Socorro	LINEAR	·	2.5 km	MPC · JPL
640681	2001 XY_{241}	—	December 9, 2001	Palomar	NEAT	·	1.2 km	MPC · JPL
640682	2001 XL_{262}	—	December 14, 2001	Socorro	LINEAR	·	790 m	MPC · JPL
640683	2001 XC_{268}	—	December 15, 2001	Apache Point	SDSS Collaboration	EOS	1.8 km	MPC · JPL
640684	2001 XC_{269}	—	October 10, 2008	Mount Lemmon	Mount Lemmon Survey	·	750 m	MPC · JPL
640685	2001 XF_{269}	—	July 23, 2015	Haleakala	Pan-STARRS 1	·	790 m	MPC · JPL
640686	2001 YN_{13}	—	December 14, 2001	Kitt Peak	Spacewatch	·	1.6 km	MPC · JPL
640687	2001 YP_{13}	—	December 17, 2001	Socorro	LINEAR	·	1.6 km	MPC · JPL
640688	2001 YL_{15}	—	December 17, 2001	Socorro	LINEAR	·	1.8 km	MPC · JPL
640689	2001 YY_{55}	—	December 18, 2001	Socorro	LINEAR	·	980 m	MPC · JPL
640690	2001 YS_{134}	—	December 18, 2001	Socorro	LINEAR	·	2.8 km	MPC · JPL
640691	2001 YJ_{144}	—	December 17, 2001	Socorro	LINEAR	·	2.0 km	MPC · JPL
640692	2001 YZ_{162}	—	January 10, 2011	Mount Lemmon	Mount Lemmon Survey	WIT	930 m	MPC · JPL
640693	2001 YD_{163}	—	January 21, 2013	Mount Lemmon	Mount Lemmon Survey	·	1.7 km	MPC · JPL
640694	2001 YL_{163}	—	October 28, 2014	Haleakala	Pan-STARRS 1	PAD	1.3 km	MPC · JPL
640695	2001 YM_{163}	—	September 18, 2009	Catalina	CSS	H	510 m	MPC · JPL
640696	2001 YP_{163}	—	September 19, 2012	Mount Lemmon	Mount Lemmon Survey	·	2.9 km	MPC · JPL
640697	2001 YR_{163}	—	January 4, 2013	Mount Lemmon	Mount Lemmon Survey	·	2.4 km	MPC · JPL
640698	2001 YW_{163}	—	January 5, 2013	Kitt Peak	Spacewatch	V	510 m	MPC · JPL
640699	2001 YU_{164}	—	December 20, 2001	Apache Point	SDSS Collaboration	PHO	760 m	MPC · JPL
640700	2001 YA_{165}	—	September 21, 2017	Haleakala	Pan-STARRS 1	TIR	2.2 km	MPC · JPL

== 640701–640800 ==
back to top

Designation			Discovery			Properties		Ref
Permanent	Provisional	Named after	Date	Site	Discoverer(s)	Category	Diam.	Ref
640701	2001 YC_{165}	—	August 6, 2017	Haleakala	Pan-STARRS 1	·	2.8 km	MPC · JPL
640702	2001 YL_{165}	—	February 26, 2014	Haleakala	Pan-STARRS 1	VER	2.3 km	MPC · JPL
640703	2001 YN_{165}	—	November 8, 2010	Mount Lemmon	Mount Lemmon Survey	·	2.1 km	MPC · JPL
640704	2001 YU_{165}	—	January 10, 2016	Haleakala	Pan-STARRS 1	·	2.3 km	MPC · JPL
640705	2002 AK_{17}	—	January 9, 2002	Socorro	LINEAR	H	550 m	MPC · JPL
640706	2002 AK_{45}	—	January 9, 2002	Socorro	LINEAR	·	530 m	MPC · JPL
640707	2002 AY_{73}	—	December 20, 2001	Kitt Peak	Spacewatch	TIR	2.3 km	MPC · JPL
640708	2002 AM_{129}	—	January 4, 2002	Haleakala	NEAT	·	1.6 km	MPC · JPL
640709	2002 AV_{143}	—	January 13, 2002	Kitt Peak	Spacewatch	·	2.2 km	MPC · JPL
640710	2002 AL_{147}	—	January 14, 2002	Socorro	LINEAR	·	2.6 km	MPC · JPL
640711	2002 AX_{196}	—	January 5, 2002	Kitt Peak	Spacewatch	H	530 m	MPC · JPL
640712	2002 AW_{204}	—	January 15, 2002	Piszkéstető	K. Sárneczky, Z. Heiner	·	2.5 km	MPC · JPL
640713	2002 AQ_{209}	—	January 14, 2002	Kitt Peak	Spacewatch	·	2.5 km	MPC · JPL
640714	2002 AV_{210}	—	November 6, 2010	Kitt Peak	Spacewatch	·	1.1 km	MPC · JPL
640715	2002 AY_{210}	—	August 8, 2016	Haleakala	Pan-STARRS 1	LUT	3.4 km	MPC · JPL
640716	2002 AL_{211}	—	February 12, 2008	Kitt Peak	Spacewatch	·	3.2 km	MPC · JPL
640717	2002 AG_{212}	—	June 13, 2016	Haleakala	Pan-STARRS 1	·	3.0 km	MPC · JPL
640718	2002 AQ_{212}	—	January 16, 2013	Haleakala	Pan-STARRS 1	·	2.6 km	MPC · JPL
640719	2002 AD_{213}	—	November 3, 2011	Mount Lemmon	Mount Lemmon Survey	(31811)	2.5 km	MPC · JPL
640720	2002 AF_{213}	—	April 20, 2014	Mount Lemmon	Mount Lemmon Survey	·	2.3 km	MPC · JPL
640721	2002 AC_{214}	—	December 22, 2012	Haleakala	Pan-STARRS 1	·	2.9 km	MPC · JPL
640722	2002 AR_{214}	—	March 12, 2014	Mount Lemmon	Mount Lemmon Survey	VER	2.0 km	MPC · JPL
640723	2002 AS_{214}	—	February 13, 2011	Mount Lemmon	Mount Lemmon Survey	·	1.6 km	MPC · JPL
640724	2002 AU_{214}	—	January 9, 2015	Haleakala	Pan-STARRS 1	·	1.4 km	MPC · JPL
640725	2002 AA_{215}	—	September 25, 2017	Haleakala	Pan-STARRS 1	·	1.8 km	MPC · JPL
640726	2002 AD_{215}	—	December 23, 2012	Haleakala	Pan-STARRS 1	·	2.1 km	MPC · JPL
640727	2002 AX_{215}	—	September 30, 2017	Haleakala	Pan-STARRS 1	VER	2.0 km	MPC · JPL
640728	2002 AB_{216}	—	September 14, 2017	Haleakala	Pan-STARRS 1	VER	2.0 km	MPC · JPL
640729	2002 AH_{216}	—	January 11, 2008	Mount Lemmon	Mount Lemmon Survey	TIR	1.7 km	MPC · JPL
640730	2002 AT_{216}	—	January 31, 2006	Kitt Peak	Spacewatch	·	990 m	MPC · JPL
640731	2002 BG_{31}	—	January 19, 2002	Socorro	LINEAR	·	2.4 km	MPC · JPL
640732	2002 BF_{34}	—	November 24, 2017	Haleakala	Pan-STARRS 1	URS	2.4 km	MPC · JPL
640733	2002 BM_{34}	—	August 4, 2013	Haleakala	Pan-STARRS 1	·	1.4 km	MPC · JPL
640734	2002 CF_{1}	—	February 2, 2002	Cima Ekar	ADAS	·	3.4 km	MPC · JPL
640735	2002 CC_{17}	—	January 14, 2002	Palomar	NEAT	H	520 m	MPC · JPL
640736	2002 CS_{44}	—	February 6, 2002	Kitt Peak	Spacewatch	·	1.2 km	MPC · JPL
640737	2002 CW_{44}	—	February 8, 2002	Kitt Peak	Spacewatch	THM	1.8 km	MPC · JPL
640738	2002 CS_{65}	—	February 6, 2002	Socorro	LINEAR	·	2.7 km	MPC · JPL
640739	2002 CO_{71}	—	February 7, 2002	Socorro	LINEAR	·	1.4 km	MPC · JPL
640740	2002 CW_{85}	—	February 7, 2002	Socorro	LINEAR	·	2.8 km	MPC · JPL
640741	2002 CL_{124}	—	January 14, 2002	Socorro	LINEAR	·	1.1 km	MPC · JPL
640742	2002 CH_{178}	—	January 14, 2002	Socorro	LINEAR	·	2.4 km	MPC · JPL
640743	2002 CH_{187}	—	February 10, 2002	Socorro	LINEAR	·	3.0 km	MPC · JPL
640744	2002 CL_{194}	—	February 10, 2002	Socorro	LINEAR	GEF	1.1 km	MPC · JPL
640745	2002 CV_{227}	—	February 4, 2002	Haleakala	NEAT	·	2.7 km	MPC · JPL
640746	2002 CH_{246}	—	February 13, 2002	Kitt Peak	Spacewatch	·	1.6 km	MPC · JPL
640747	2002 CH_{250}	—	February 6, 2002	Kitt Peak	Deep Ecliptic Survey	·	2.1 km	MPC · JPL
640748	2002 CJ_{255}	—	February 6, 2002	Kitt Peak	Spacewatch	·	1.3 km	MPC · JPL
640749	2002 CO_{259}	—	February 8, 2002	Kitt Peak	Spacewatch	·	3.1 km	MPC · JPL
640750	2002 CE_{261}	—	February 8, 2002	Kitt Peak	Spacewatch	·	1.6 km	MPC · JPL
640751	2002 CB_{275}	—	January 20, 2002	Kitt Peak	Spacewatch	·	1.3 km	MPC · JPL
640752	2002 CY_{275}	—	February 9, 2002	Kitt Peak	Spacewatch	·	2.7 km	MPC · JPL
640753	2002 CN_{279}	—	February 7, 2002	Kitt Peak	Spacewatch	·	1.3 km	MPC · JPL
640754	2002 CA_{287}	—	February 8, 2002	Palomar	NEAT	·	2.8 km	MPC · JPL
640755	2002 CW_{288}	—	February 10, 2002	Socorro	LINEAR	·	1.8 km	MPC · JPL
640756	2002 CC_{291}	—	February 10, 2002	Socorro	LINEAR	·	1.2 km	MPC · JPL
640757	2002 CV_{318}	—	July 21, 2004	Siding Spring	SSS	BAR	1.3 km	MPC · JPL
640758	2002 CE_{319}	—	December 14, 2006	Kitt Peak	Spacewatch	·	2.4 km	MPC · JPL
640759	2002 CE_{320}	—	November 21, 2008	Kitt Peak	Spacewatch	·	960 m	MPC · JPL
640760	2002 CJ_{320}	—	September 28, 2011	Mount Lemmon	Mount Lemmon Survey	V	590 m	MPC · JPL
640761	2002 CP_{320}	—	February 15, 2002	Cerro Tololo	Deep Lens Survey	·	960 m	MPC · JPL
640762	2002 CQ_{320}	—	February 13, 2002	Kitt Peak	Spacewatch	·	800 m	MPC · JPL
640763	2002 CR_{320}	—	September 24, 2011	Haleakala	Pan-STARRS 1	·	2.2 km	MPC · JPL
640764	2002 CU_{320}	—	January 31, 2006	Kitt Peak	Spacewatch	NYS	1 km	MPC · JPL
640765	2002 CD_{323}	—	December 21, 2008	Mount Lemmon	Mount Lemmon Survey	·	1.0 km	MPC · JPL
640766	2002 CG_{323}	—	October 23, 2011	Haleakala	Pan-STARRS 1	·	2.1 km	MPC · JPL
640767	2002 CM_{323}	—	September 23, 2008	Mount Lemmon	Mount Lemmon Survey	·	970 m	MPC · JPL
640768	2002 CN_{323}	—	September 30, 2017	Haleakala	Pan-STARRS 1	VER	2.2 km	MPC · JPL
640769	2002 CW_{323}	—	May 20, 2015	Cerro Tololo	DECam	·	2.5 km	MPC · JPL
640770	2002 CE_{324}	—	December 3, 2005	Mauna Kea	A. Boattini	·	1.1 km	MPC · JPL
640771	2002 CH_{326}	—	February 12, 2013	Haleakala	Pan-STARRS 1	L4	6.4 km	MPC · JPL
640772	2002 CJ_{326}	—	November 6, 2010	Mount Lemmon	Mount Lemmon Survey	L4	6.2 km	MPC · JPL
640773	2002 CQ_{326}	—	September 30, 2017	Haleakala	Pan-STARRS 1	·	2.2 km	MPC · JPL
640774	2002 CW_{326}	—	August 1, 2017	Haleakala	Pan-STARRS 1	·	2.2 km	MPC · JPL
640775	2002 CY_{326}	—	December 9, 2017	Mount Lemmon	Mount Lemmon Survey	·	1.1 km	MPC · JPL
640776	2002 CA_{327}	—	October 16, 2009	Mount Lemmon	Mount Lemmon Survey	L4	6.4 km	MPC · JPL
640777	2002 CZ_{327}	—	November 8, 2007	Mount Lemmon	Mount Lemmon Survey	·	530 m	MPC · JPL
640778	2002 CA_{328}	—	November 18, 2007	Kitt Peak	Spacewatch	·	610 m	MPC · JPL
640779	2002 CB_{328}	—	February 10, 2011	Mount Lemmon	Mount Lemmon Survey	·	1.4 km	MPC · JPL
640780	2002 CC_{328}	—	January 26, 2017	Mount Lemmon	Mount Lemmon Survey	MAS	610 m	MPC · JPL
640781	2002 CN_{329}	—	February 8, 2002	Kitt Peak	Deep Ecliptic Survey	·	2.0 km	MPC · JPL
640782	2002 CS_{329}	—	February 7, 2002	Kitt Peak	Spacewatch	·	2.2 km	MPC · JPL
640783	2002 DE_{21}	—	September 27, 2011	Mount Lemmon	Mount Lemmon Survey	VER	2.7 km	MPC · JPL
640784	2002 DW_{21}	—	February 17, 2010	Kitt Peak	Spacewatch	3:2	5.3 km	MPC · JPL
640785	2002 EH_{3}	—	March 5, 2002	Anderson Mesa	LONEOS	T_{j} (2.95)	2.2 km	MPC · JPL
640786	2002 EW_{6}	—	March 6, 2002	Siding Spring	R. H. McNaught	MAS	620 m	MPC · JPL
640787	2002 ET_{18}	—	March 9, 2002	Kitt Peak	Spacewatch	·	580 m	MPC · JPL
640788	2002 EC_{32}	—	March 9, 2002	Palomar	NEAT	·	2.7 km	MPC · JPL
640789	2002 EM_{47}	—	March 12, 2002	Palomar	NEAT	·	980 m	MPC · JPL
640790	2002 EU_{66}	—	March 6, 2002	Palomar	NEAT	·	1.5 km	MPC · JPL
640791	2002 ED_{94}	—	March 5, 2002	Kitt Peak	Spacewatch	PHO	1.1 km	MPC · JPL
640792	2002 EH_{112}	—	March 10, 2002	Kitt Peak	Spacewatch	·	590 m	MPC · JPL
640793	2002 EC_{117}	—	March 9, 2002	Kitt Peak	Spacewatch	·	1.1 km	MPC · JPL
640794	2002 EX_{136}	—	March 12, 2002	Palomar	NEAT	MAS	550 m	MPC · JPL
640795	2002 EF_{145}	—	March 13, 2002	Socorro	LINEAR	NYS	1.1 km	MPC · JPL
640796	2002 EQ_{157}	—	March 11, 2002	Kitt Peak	Spacewatch	L4	6.4 km	MPC · JPL
640797	2002 EU_{162}	—	March 11, 2002	Palomar	NEAT	TIR	2.5 km	MPC · JPL
640798	2002 EA_{163}	—	March 13, 2002	Palomar	NEAT	·	1.3 km	MPC · JPL
640799	2002 EA_{166}	—	March 24, 2006	Kitt Peak	Spacewatch	·	940 m	MPC · JPL
640800	2002 EW_{166}	—	August 10, 2007	Kitt Peak	Spacewatch	PHO	740 m	MPC · JPL

== 640801–640900 ==
back to top

Designation			Discovery			Properties		Ref
Permanent	Provisional	Named after	Date	Site	Discoverer(s)	Category	Diam.	Ref
640801	2002 EO_{167}	—	September 24, 2011	Mount Lemmon	Mount Lemmon Survey	·	920 m	MPC · JPL
640802	2002 EU_{167}	—	May 7, 2014	Haleakala	Pan-STARRS 1	·	2.6 km	MPC · JPL
640803	2002 EV_{167}	—	February 8, 2013	Haleakala	Pan-STARRS 1	·	2.2 km	MPC · JPL
640804	2002 EY_{167}	—	March 9, 2002	Kitt Peak	Spacewatch	·	2.3 km	MPC · JPL
640805	2002 ES_{168}	—	January 16, 2016	Haleakala	Pan-STARRS 1	·	1.8 km	MPC · JPL
640806	2002 EV_{168}	—	April 26, 2006	Kitt Peak	Spacewatch	MAS	630 m	MPC · JPL
640807	2002 EJ_{169}	—	October 26, 2011	Haleakala	Pan-STARRS 1	·	2.3 km	MPC · JPL
640808	2002 EM_{169}	—	June 19, 2004	Kitt Peak	Spacewatch	EUN	1.3 km	MPC · JPL
640809	2002 EU_{169}	—	January 26, 2007	Kitt Peak	Spacewatch	·	2.9 km	MPC · JPL
640810	2002 EW_{169}	—	March 5, 2002	Apache Point	SDSS Collaboration	·	870 m	MPC · JPL
640811	2002 EX_{170}	—	March 15, 2008	Mount Lemmon	Mount Lemmon Survey	TIR	2.2 km	MPC · JPL
640812	2002 EC_{171}	—	March 5, 2002	Apache Point	SDSS Collaboration	L4	6.8 km	MPC · JPL
640813	2002 EF_{171}	—	October 13, 2010	Kitt Peak	Spacewatch	L4	7.0 km	MPC · JPL
640814	2002 FW_{4}	—	February 22, 2002	Palomar	NEAT	PHO	990 m	MPC · JPL
640815	2002 FZ_{15}	—	March 11, 2002	Palomar	NEAT	·	1.3 km	MPC · JPL
640816	2002 FM_{18}	—	February 6, 2002	Kitt Peak	Deep Ecliptic Survey	V	480 m	MPC · JPL
640817	2002 FX_{22}	—	March 17, 2002	Kitt Peak	Spacewatch	·	1.1 km	MPC · JPL
640818	2002 FT_{25}	—	March 19, 2002	Palomar	NEAT	·	2.4 km	MPC · JPL
640819	2002 FM_{42}	—	July 7, 2016	Haleakala	Pan-STARRS 1	LUT	2.9 km	MPC · JPL
640820	2002 FN_{42}	—	September 10, 2004	Kitt Peak	Spacewatch	·	1.2 km	MPC · JPL
640821	2002 FO_{42}	—	December 3, 2008	Kitt Peak	Spacewatch	·	940 m	MPC · JPL
640822	2002 FU_{42}	—	August 11, 2016	Haleakala	Pan-STARRS 1	·	2.4 km	MPC · JPL
640823	2002 FE_{43}	—	January 6, 2013	Kitt Peak	Spacewatch	NYS	840 m	MPC · JPL
640824	2002 FL_{43}	—	March 10, 2016	Haleakala	Pan-STARRS 1	·	1.6 km	MPC · JPL
640825	2002 FM_{43}	—	December 23, 2012	Haleakala	Pan-STARRS 1	MAS	580 m	MPC · JPL
640826	2002 GL_{27}	—	April 6, 2002	Cerro Tololo	Deep Ecliptic Survey	·	2.5 km	MPC · JPL
640827	2002 GV_{62}	—	April 8, 2002	Palomar	NEAT	·	2.3 km	MPC · JPL
640828	2002 GM_{63}	—	April 8, 2002	Palomar	NEAT	·	620 m	MPC · JPL
640829	2002 GP_{89}	—	April 8, 2002	Palomar	NEAT	MAS	770 m	MPC · JPL
640830	2002 GK_{90}	—	April 8, 2002	Palomar	NEAT	NYS	1.3 km	MPC · JPL
640831	2002 GN_{147}	—	April 13, 2002	Palomar	NEAT	·	1.1 km	MPC · JPL
640832	2002 GT_{147}	—	April 13, 2002	Palomar	NEAT	·	900 m	MPC · JPL
640833	2002 GX_{149}	—	April 4, 2002	Palomar	NEAT	·	1.2 km	MPC · JPL
640834	2002 GW_{157}	—	April 13, 2002	Palomar	NEAT	·	1.5 km	MPC · JPL
640835	2002 GR_{186}	—	April 8, 2002	Palomar	NEAT	NYS	1.1 km	MPC · JPL
640836	2002 GK_{187}	—	April 14, 2002	Palomar	NEAT	·	830 m	MPC · JPL
640837	2002 GV_{187}	—	April 4, 2002	Palomar	NEAT	T_{j} (2.99)	2.8 km	MPC · JPL
640838	2002 GH_{188}	—	April 13, 2002	Palomar	NEAT	·	1.2 km	MPC · JPL
640839	2002 GF_{189}	—	April 8, 2002	Palomar	NEAT	·	1.5 km	MPC · JPL
640840	2002 GH_{191}	—	April 4, 2010	Catalina	CSS	H	660 m	MPC · JPL
640841	2002 GH_{192}	—	October 28, 2005	Kitt Peak	Spacewatch	·	3.3 km	MPC · JPL
640842	2002 GN_{192}	—	September 17, 2010	Mount Lemmon	Mount Lemmon Survey	VER	2.3 km	MPC · JPL
640843	2002 GV_{193}	—	August 18, 2009	Kitt Peak	Spacewatch	·	600 m	MPC · JPL
640844	2002 GB_{194}	—	November 26, 2013	Haleakala	Pan-STARRS 1	·	1.8 km	MPC · JPL
640845	2002 GK_{194}	—	March 5, 2013	Haleakala	Pan-STARRS 1	·	2.2 km	MPC · JPL
640846	2002 GX_{194}	—	October 5, 2013	Mount Lemmon	Mount Lemmon Survey	·	1.9 km	MPC · JPL
640847	2002 GC_{197}	—	October 10, 2005	Kitt Peak	Spacewatch	·	2.6 km	MPC · JPL
640848	2002 GJ_{197}	—	October 30, 2010	Mount Lemmon	Mount Lemmon Survey	VER	2.2 km	MPC · JPL
640849	2002 GN_{197}	—	January 19, 2012	Mount Lemmon	Mount Lemmon Survey	L4	7.2 km	MPC · JPL
640850	2002 HM_{18}	—	October 30, 2010	Mount Lemmon	Mount Lemmon Survey	·	3.0 km	MPC · JPL
640851	2002 JL_{151}	—	November 6, 2005	Mount Lemmon	Mount Lemmon Survey	TIR	3.2 km	MPC · JPL
640852	2002 JR_{153}	—	October 23, 2004	Kitt Peak	Spacewatch	·	3.5 km	MPC · JPL
640853	2002 KF_{17}	—	October 14, 2013	Mount Lemmon	Mount Lemmon Survey	·	580 m	MPC · JPL
640854	2002 KH_{17}	—	September 7, 2008	Mount Lemmon	Mount Lemmon Survey	MRX	1.1 km	MPC · JPL
640855	2002 KQ_{17}	—	February 24, 2017	Mount Lemmon	Mount Lemmon Survey	·	970 m	MPC · JPL
640856	2002 LR_{62}	—	June 13, 2002	Palomar	NEAT	·	940 m	MPC · JPL
640857	2002 LF_{63}	—	June 13, 2002	Palomar	NEAT	·	1.3 km	MPC · JPL
640858	2002 LG_{63}	—	June 2, 2002	Palomar	NEAT	·	580 m	MPC · JPL
640859	2002 LH_{64}	—	August 13, 2002	Palomar	NEAT	·	670 m	MPC · JPL
640860	2002 LD_{66}	—	February 8, 2013	Haleakala	Pan-STARRS 1	·	1.1 km	MPC · JPL
640861	2002 LF_{66}	—	March 10, 2016	Haleakala	Pan-STARRS 1	·	1.7 km	MPC · JPL
640862	2002 MP_{4}	—	June 5, 2002	Kitt Peak	Spacewatch	·	2.9 km	MPC · JPL
640863	2002 ML_{5}	—	June 29, 2002	Palomar	NEAT	·	630 m	MPC · JPL
640864	2002 MO_{6}	—	June 22, 2002	Palomar	NEAT	·	1.4 km	MPC · JPL
640865	2002 MY_{7}	—	January 23, 2015	Haleakala	Pan-STARRS 1	·	650 m	MPC · JPL
640866	2002 MJ_{8}	—	June 14, 2012	Mount Lemmon	Mount Lemmon Survey	·	590 m	MPC · JPL
640867	2002 NS_{7}	—	June 13, 2002	Palomar	NEAT	PHO	1.2 km	MPC · JPL
640868	2002 NM_{16}	—	July 5, 2002	Socorro	LINEAR	·	1.3 km	MPC · JPL
640869	2002 NZ_{40}	—	July 5, 2002	Palomar	NEAT	·	560 m	MPC · JPL
640870	2002 NB_{41}	—	July 14, 2002	Palomar	NEAT	H	670 m	MPC · JPL
640871	2002 NF_{55}	—	July 5, 2002	Palomar	NEAT	THB	3.4 km	MPC · JPL
640872	2002 ND_{65}	—	July 9, 2002	Palomar	NEAT	·	1.1 km	MPC · JPL
640873	2002 NP_{66}	—	July 9, 2002	Palomar	NEAT	EUN	900 m	MPC · JPL
640874	2002 NL_{71}	—	July 8, 2002	Palomar	NEAT	RAF	840 m	MPC · JPL
640875	2002 NC_{72}	—	June 11, 2002	Kitt Peak	Spacewatch	·	2.4 km	MPC · JPL
640876	2002 NN_{74}	—	July 12, 2002	Palomar	NEAT	·	930 m	MPC · JPL
640877	2002 NR_{76}	—	October 30, 2007	Kitt Peak	Spacewatch	DOR	1.8 km	MPC · JPL
640878	2002 NT_{76}	—	July 12, 2002	Palomar	NEAT	·	1 km	MPC · JPL
640879	2002 NR_{79}	—	December 18, 2003	Kitt Peak	Spacewatch	·	1.2 km	MPC · JPL
640880	2002 NR_{80}	—	July 14, 2002	Palomar	NEAT	·	1.6 km	MPC · JPL
640881	2002 NZ_{80}	—	June 3, 2006	Mount Lemmon	Mount Lemmon Survey	·	1.2 km	MPC · JPL
640882	2002 NC_{81}	—	March 8, 2008	Kitt Peak	Spacewatch	·	600 m	MPC · JPL
640883	2002 NL_{81}	—	August 5, 2002	Palomar	NEAT	·	1.2 km	MPC · JPL
640884	2002 NZ_{81}	—	August 15, 2002	Palomar	NEAT	·	1.3 km	MPC · JPL
640885	2002 NN_{82}	—	August 31, 2014	Haleakala	Pan-STARRS 1	·	2.7 km	MPC · JPL
640886	2002 NO_{82}	—	January 14, 2008	Kitt Peak	Spacewatch	·	1.3 km	MPC · JPL
640887	2002 OQ_{29}	—	July 22, 2002	Palomar	NEAT	·	3.7 km	MPC · JPL
640888	2002 OS_{30}	—	July 20, 2002	Palomar	NEAT	MAR	1.1 km	MPC · JPL
640889	2002 OT_{31}	—	July 17, 2002	Palomar	NEAT	·	710 m	MPC · JPL
640890	2002 OT_{32}	—	August 11, 2007	Siding Spring	SSS	·	2.3 km	MPC · JPL
640891	2002 OX_{36}	—	December 20, 2007	Kitt Peak	Spacewatch	·	1.3 km	MPC · JPL
640892	2002 PB_{4}	—	August 5, 2002	Palomar	NEAT	·	1.5 km	MPC · JPL
640893	2002 PN_{7}	—	August 6, 2002	Palomar	NEAT	EUN	1.3 km	MPC · JPL
640894	2002 PT_{7}	—	August 6, 2002	Palomar	NEAT	·	940 m	MPC · JPL
640895	2002 PO_{8}	—	August 5, 2002	Palomar	NEAT	(5)	1.3 km	MPC · JPL
640896	2002 PN_{72}	—	July 9, 2002	Palomar	NEAT	·	1.1 km	MPC · JPL
640897	2002 PF_{89}	—	August 3, 2002	Palomar	NEAT	JUN	1.2 km	MPC · JPL
640898	2002 PL_{111}	—	August 14, 2002	Socorro	LINEAR	·	1.0 km	MPC · JPL
640899	2002 PL_{114}	—	August 13, 2002	Kitt Peak	Spacewatch	·	530 m	MPC · JPL
640900	2002 PM_{122}	—	August 5, 2002	Palomar	NEAT	(5)	1.0 km	MPC · JPL

== 640901–641000 ==
back to top

Designation			Discovery			Properties		Ref
Permanent	Provisional	Named after	Date	Site	Discoverer(s)	Category	Diam.	Ref
640901	2002 PA_{142}	—	August 15, 2002	Palomar	NEAT	H	600 m	MPC · JPL
640902	2002 PY_{175}	—	August 11, 2002	Palomar	NEAT	·	1.9 km	MPC · JPL
640903	2002 PH_{176}	—	August 7, 2002	Palomar	NEAT	EUN	1.2 km	MPC · JPL
640904	2002 PA_{184}	—	August 7, 2002	Palomar	NEAT	·	960 m	MPC · JPL
640905	2002 PG_{184}	—	August 15, 2002	Palomar	NEAT	·	1.1 km	MPC · JPL
640906	2002 PJ_{184}	—	September 11, 2007	Mount Lemmon	Mount Lemmon Survey	·	1.7 km	MPC · JPL
640907	2002 PR_{185}	—	August 15, 2002	Palomar	NEAT	·	900 m	MPC · JPL
640908	2002 PV_{187}	—	August 8, 2002	Palomar	NEAT	·	1.1 km	MPC · JPL
640909	2002 PY_{191}	—	August 13, 2002	Anderson Mesa	LONEOS	·	740 m	MPC · JPL
640910	2002 PS_{193}	—	October 5, 2002	Apache Point	SDSS Collaboration	·	630 m	MPC · JPL
640911	2002 PH_{194}	—	August 16, 2006	Siding Spring	SSS	·	1.2 km	MPC · JPL
640912	2002 PH_{195}	—	December 20, 2004	Mount Lemmon	Mount Lemmon Survey	·	4.0 km	MPC · JPL
640913	2002 PN_{196}	—	August 14, 2009	La Sagra	OAM	·	640 m	MPC · JPL
640914	2002 PX_{196}	—	October 11, 2007	Mount Lemmon	Mount Lemmon Survey	·	1.6 km	MPC · JPL
640915	2002 PY_{197}	—	August 10, 2009	Kitt Peak	Spacewatch	·	640 m	MPC · JPL
640916	2002 PG_{202}	—	December 25, 2011	Mount Lemmon	Mount Lemmon Survey	·	1.3 km	MPC · JPL
640917	2002 PX_{202}	—	April 16, 2013	Cerro Tololo	DECam	MAR	940 m	MPC · JPL
640918	2002 PB_{203}	—	July 20, 2002	Palomar	NEAT	·	1.7 km	MPC · JPL
640919	2002 PH_{203}	—	August 19, 2006	Kitt Peak	Spacewatch	·	1.5 km	MPC · JPL
640920	2002 PV_{203}	—	October 15, 2009	Kitt Peak	Spacewatch	·	630 m	MPC · JPL
640921	2002 PC_{205}	—	September 26, 2011	Piszkés-tető	K. Sárneczky, A. Pál	·	1.2 km	MPC · JPL
640922	2002 PG_{205}	—	December 9, 2015	Haleakala	Pan-STARRS 1	KON	2.0 km	MPC · JPL
640923	2002 PZ_{205}	—	October 8, 2015	Haleakala	Pan-STARRS 1	EUN	980 m	MPC · JPL
640924	2002 QY_{1}	—	August 16, 2002	Palomar	NEAT	·	1.2 km	MPC · JPL
640925	2002 QJ_{2}	—	July 30, 2002	Haleakala	NEAT	ADE	2.0 km	MPC · JPL
640926	2002 QB_{6}	—	August 17, 2002	Socorro	LINEAR	·	1.2 km	MPC · JPL
640927	2002 QZ_{12}	—	August 13, 2002	Anderson Mesa	LONEOS	·	1 km	MPC · JPL
640928	2002 QK_{13}	—	July 30, 2002	Haleakala	NEAT	·	1.9 km	MPC · JPL
640929	2002 QY_{48}	—	August 29, 2002	Palomar	R. Matson	·	1.1 km	MPC · JPL
640930	2002 QH_{58}	—	August 29, 2002	Palomar	NEAT	BRA	1.3 km	MPC · JPL
640931	2002 QO_{60}	—	August 26, 2002	Palomar	NEAT	·	1.3 km	MPC · JPL
640932	2002 QK_{64}	—	August 18, 2002	Palomar	NEAT	BRG	1.4 km	MPC · JPL
640933	2002 QP_{73}	—	August 30, 2002	Palomar	NEAT	·	1.0 km	MPC · JPL
640934	2002 QT_{90}	—	August 30, 2002	Palomar	NEAT	·	2.0 km	MPC · JPL
640935	2002 QN_{92}	—	August 29, 2002	Palomar	NEAT	·	1.6 km	MPC · JPL
640936	2002 QG_{95}	—	August 8, 2002	Palomar	NEAT	·	1.5 km	MPC · JPL
640937	2002 QP_{95}	—	August 18, 2002	Palomar	NEAT	·	630 m	MPC · JPL
640938	2002 QS_{98}	—	August 30, 2002	Palomar	NEAT	·	920 m	MPC · JPL
640939	2002 QM_{100}	—	August 19, 2002	Palomar	NEAT	·	3.7 km	MPC · JPL
640940	2002 QU_{102}	—	August 29, 2002	Palomar	NEAT	EOS	1.6 km	MPC · JPL
640941	2002 QU_{105}	—	August 29, 2002	Palomar	NEAT	·	1.0 km	MPC · JPL
640942	2002 QY_{105}	—	August 19, 2002	Palomar	NEAT	·	1.9 km	MPC · JPL
640943	2002 QR_{108}	—	August 27, 2002	Palomar	NEAT	·	920 m	MPC · JPL
640944	2002 QN_{109}	—	August 17, 2002	Palomar	NEAT	·	490 m	MPC · JPL
640945	2002 QX_{117}	—	August 18, 2002	Palomar	NEAT	·	1.0 km	MPC · JPL
640946	2002 QT_{120}	—	August 30, 2002	Palomar	NEAT	·	1.6 km	MPC · JPL
640947	2002 QE_{124}	—	August 16, 2002	Palomar	NEAT	·	1.0 km	MPC · JPL
640948	2002 QS_{126}	—	August 30, 2002	Palomar	NEAT	·	1.6 km	MPC · JPL
640949	2002 QV_{126}	—	August 27, 2002	Palomar	NEAT	·	980 m	MPC · JPL
640950	2002 QL_{127}	—	August 30, 2002	Palomar	NEAT	·	1.9 km	MPC · JPL
640951	2002 QG_{132}	—	August 16, 2002	Palomar	NEAT	·	730 m	MPC · JPL
640952	2002 QF_{134}	—	August 29, 2002	Palomar	NEAT	·	1.1 km	MPC · JPL
640953	2002 QV_{134}	—	August 30, 2002	Palomar	NEAT	·	1.6 km	MPC · JPL
640954	2002 QV_{136}	—	October 5, 2002	Apache Point	SDSS Collaboration	·	1.1 km	MPC · JPL
640955	2002 QK_{138}	—	August 30, 2002	Kitt Peak	Spacewatch	·	1.0 km	MPC · JPL
640956	2002 QZ_{139}	—	August 17, 2002	Palomar	NEAT	·	710 m	MPC · JPL
640957	2002 QC_{141}	—	December 30, 2008	Mount Lemmon	Mount Lemmon Survey	H	500 m	MPC · JPL
640958	2002 QW_{143}	—	August 13, 2002	Kitt Peak	Spacewatch	(5)	840 m	MPC · JPL
640959	2002 QH_{144}	—	December 30, 2007	Kitt Peak	Spacewatch	·	950 m	MPC · JPL
640960	2002 QN_{145}	—	August 19, 2002	Palomar	NEAT	·	810 m	MPC · JPL
640961	2002 QF_{146}	—	April 10, 2005	Mount Lemmon	Mount Lemmon Survey	·	590 m	MPC · JPL
640962	2002 QK_{150}	—	May 26, 2006	Kitt Peak	Spacewatch	·	1.9 km	MPC · JPL
640963	2002 QY_{150}	—	September 5, 2002	Anderson Mesa	LONEOS	·	560 m	MPC · JPL
640964	2002 QE_{151}	—	October 30, 2008	Catalina	CSS	EOS	2.3 km	MPC · JPL
640965	2002 QT_{151}	—	August 28, 2002	Palomar	NEAT	EOS	1.9 km	MPC · JPL
640966	2002 QD_{152}	—	August 28, 2002	Palomar	NEAT	·	930 m	MPC · JPL
640967	2002 QF_{154}	—	September 28, 2009	Mount Lemmon	Mount Lemmon Survey	·	560 m	MPC · JPL
640968	2002 QP_{155}	—	August 16, 2002	Palomar	NEAT	·	1.8 km	MPC · JPL
640969	2002 QJ_{156}	—	April 18, 2012	Mount Lemmon	Mount Lemmon Survey	·	740 m	MPC · JPL
640970	2002 QF_{157}	—	August 19, 2012	Siding Spring	SSS	·	2.3 km	MPC · JPL
640971	2002 RB_{41}	—	September 5, 2002	Socorro	LINEAR	·	660 m	MPC · JPL
640972	2002 RV_{125}	—	September 8, 2002	Campo Imperatore	CINEOS	·	1.2 km	MPC · JPL
640973	2002 RM_{138}	—	September 10, 2002	Palomar	NEAT	·	1.4 km	MPC · JPL
640974	2002 RB_{143}	—	September 11, 2002	Palomar	NEAT	KON	1.5 km	MPC · JPL
640975	2002 RR_{152}	—	September 12, 2002	Palomar	NEAT	H	430 m	MPC · JPL
640976	2002 RV_{153}	—	September 13, 2002	Kitt Peak	Spacewatch	·	2.4 km	MPC · JPL
640977	2002 RM_{155}	—	September 11, 2002	Palomar	NEAT	HNS	1.4 km	MPC · JPL
640978	2002 RQ_{158}	—	September 11, 2002	Palomar	NEAT	·	650 m	MPC · JPL
640979	2002 RL_{160}	—	September 7, 2002	Socorro	LINEAR	·	970 m	MPC · JPL
640980	2002 RE_{168}	—	September 13, 2002	Palomar	NEAT	·	810 m	MPC · JPL
640981	2002 RA_{170}	—	September 13, 2002	Palomar	NEAT	·	1.1 km	MPC · JPL
640982	2002 RZ_{180}	—	September 12, 2002	Palomar	NEAT	·	1.7 km	MPC · JPL
640983	2002 RN_{183}	—	September 11, 2002	Palomar	NEAT	·	2.0 km	MPC · JPL
640984	2002 RF_{200}	—	August 28, 2002	Palomar	NEAT	·	1.5 km	MPC · JPL
640985	2002 RY_{215}	—	September 13, 2002	Anderson Mesa	LONEOS	·	710 m	MPC · JPL
640986	2002 RG_{218}	—	August 20, 2002	Palomar	NEAT	·	810 m	MPC · JPL
640987	2002 RA_{225}	—	August 28, 2002	Palomar	NEAT	·	1.3 km	MPC · JPL
640988	2002 RP_{232}	—	September 5, 2002	Palomar	NEAT	·	770 m	MPC · JPL
640989	2002 RR_{241}	—	September 14, 2002	Palomar	NEAT	·	510 m	MPC · JPL
640990	2002 RB_{244}	—	September 13, 2002	Palomar	NEAT	·	1.1 km	MPC · JPL
640991	2002 RX_{248}	—	September 14, 2002	Palomar	NEAT	·	620 m	MPC · JPL
640992	2002 RM_{253}	—	September 11, 2002	Palomar	NEAT	·	890 m	MPC · JPL
640993	2002 RT_{253}	—	September 13, 2002	Palomar	NEAT	·	560 m	MPC · JPL
640994	2002 RE_{266}	—	September 1, 2002	Palomar	NEAT	EUN	1.4 km	MPC · JPL
640995	2002 RU_{268}	—	September 4, 2002	Palomar	NEAT	·	500 m	MPC · JPL
640996	2002 RY_{272}	—	September 4, 2002	Palomar	NEAT	·	990 m	MPC · JPL
640997	2002 RH_{276}	—	September 5, 2002	Apache Point	SDSS Collaboration	·	1.3 km	MPC · JPL
640998	2002 RG_{281}	—	August 13, 2002	Palomar	NEAT	(194)	1.3 km	MPC · JPL
640999	2002 RD_{286}	—	November 7, 2007	Mount Lemmon	Mount Lemmon Survey	GEF	1.3 km	MPC · JPL
641000	2002 RG_{289}	—	September 25, 2006	Kitt Peak	Spacewatch	·	1.1 km	MPC · JPL

back to top
