= List of minor planets: 835001–836000 =

The following is a partial list of minor planets, running from minor-planet number 835001 through 836000, inclusive. The primary data for this and other partial lists is based on JPL's "Small-Body Orbital Elements" and data available from the Minor Planet Center. Critical list information is also provided by the MPC, unless otherwise specified from Lowell Observatory. A detailed description of the table's columns and additional sources are given on the main page including a complete list of every page in this series, and a statistical break-up on the dynamical classification of minor planets.

Also see the summary list of all named bodies in numerical and alphabetical order, and the corresponding naming citations for the number range of this particular list. New namings may only be added to this list after official publication, as the preannouncement of names is condemned by the Working Group for Small Bodies Nomenclature of the International Astronomical Union.

| Near-Earth obj. | MBA (inner) | MBA (outer) | Centaur |
| Mars-crosser | MBA (middle) | Jupiter trojan | Trans-Neptunian obj. |
| Unclassified |

== 835001–835100 ==
| Designation | | | Discovery | | | Properties | | Ref |
| Permanent | Provisional | Named after | Date | Site | Discoverer(s) | Category | Diam. | Ref |
|---|---|---|---|---|---|---|---|---|
| 835001 | 2010 XQ_{124} | — | February 23, 2007 | Mount Lemmon | Mount Lemmon Survey | · | 1.1 km | MPC · JPL |
| 835002 | 2010 YE | — | December 12, 2010 | Catalina | CSS | H | 470 m | MPC · JPL |
| 835003 | 2010 YT_{2} | — | December 30, 2010 | Piszkés-tető | K. Sárneczky, Z. Kuli | · | 490 m | MPC · JPL |
| 835004 | 2010 YE_{6} | — | December 25, 2010 | Mount Lemmon | Mount Lemmon Survey | EOS | 1.6 km | MPC · JPL |
| 835005 | 2010 YQ_{6} | — | December 25, 2010 | Mount Lemmon | Mount Lemmon Survey | H | 420 m | MPC · JPL |
| 835006 | 2011 AA_{2} | — | January 2, 2011 | Mount Lemmon | Mount Lemmon Survey | EOS | 1.6 km | MPC · JPL |
| 835007 | 2011 AM_{3} | — | January 2, 2011 | Mount Lemmon | Mount Lemmon Survey | H | 560 m | MPC · JPL |
| 835008 | 2011 AB_{10} | — | January 3, 2011 | Mount Lemmon | Mount Lemmon Survey | · | 410 m | MPC · JPL |
| 835009 | 2011 AY_{18} | — | January 8, 2011 | Mount Lemmon | Mount Lemmon Survey | (5651) | 2.4 km | MPC · JPL |
| 835010 | 2011 AT_{31} | — | January 10, 2011 | Mount Lemmon | Mount Lemmon Survey | · | 2.4 km | MPC · JPL |
| 835011 | 2011 AQ_{36} | — | January 12, 2011 | Mount Lemmon | Mount Lemmon Survey | H | 410 m | MPC · JPL |
| 835012 | 2011 AP_{49} | — | January 13, 2011 | Mount Lemmon | Mount Lemmon Survey | · | 2.3 km | MPC · JPL |
| 835013 | 2011 AV_{49} | — | January 8, 2011 | Kitt Peak | Spacewatch | MAR | 670 m | MPC · JPL |
| 835014 | 2011 AJ_{53} | — | January 11, 2011 | Kitt Peak | Spacewatch | H | 350 m | MPC · JPL |
| 835015 | 2011 AL_{53} | — | January 11, 2011 | Kitt Peak | Spacewatch | H | 550 m | MPC · JPL |
| 835016 | 2011 AD_{60} | — | December 8, 2010 | Mount Lemmon | Mount Lemmon Survey | H | 410 m | MPC · JPL |
| 835017 | 2011 AW_{62} | — | December 9, 2010 | Mount Lemmon | Mount Lemmon Survey | · | 2.1 km | MPC · JPL |
| 835018 | 2011 AH_{64} | — | January 14, 2011 | Mount Lemmon | Mount Lemmon Survey | · | 830 m | MPC · JPL |
| 835019 | 2011 AW_{70} | — | January 3, 2011 | Mount Lemmon | Mount Lemmon Survey | · | 980 m | MPC · JPL |
| 835020 | 2011 AW_{75} | — | December 3, 2010 | Mount Lemmon | Mount Lemmon Survey | · | 1.9 km | MPC · JPL |
| 835021 | 2011 AE_{77} | — | January 12, 2011 | ESA OGS | ESA OGS | H | 410 m | MPC · JPL |
| 835022 | 2011 AW_{82} | — | January 13, 2011 | Mount Lemmon | Mount Lemmon Survey | · | 910 m | MPC · JPL |
| 835023 | 2011 AK_{85} | — | July 27, 2014 | Haleakala | Pan-STARRS 1 | · | 940 m | MPC · JPL |
| 835024 | 2011 AW_{87} | — | January 10, 2011 | Mount Lemmon | Mount Lemmon Survey | · | 590 m | MPC · JPL |
| 835025 | 2011 AW_{91} | — | January 8, 2011 | Mount Lemmon | Mount Lemmon Survey | · | 2.4 km | MPC · JPL |
| 835026 | 2011 AE_{92} | — | January 13, 2011 | Mount Lemmon | Mount Lemmon Survey | · | 1.1 km | MPC · JPL |
| 835027 | 2011 AH_{93} | — | January 14, 2011 | Kitt Peak | Spacewatch | · | 2.5 km | MPC · JPL |
| 835028 | 2011 AV_{96} | — | January 13, 2011 | ESA OGS | ESA OGS | · | 910 m | MPC · JPL |
| 835029 | 2011 AN_{98} | — | January 13, 2011 | Mount Lemmon | Mount Lemmon Survey | · | 900 m | MPC · JPL |
| 835030 | 2011 AJ_{99} | — | September 16, 2009 | Mount Lemmon | Mount Lemmon Survey | · | 2.0 km | MPC · JPL |
| 835031 | 2011 AK_{99} | — | January 14, 2011 | Kitt Peak | Spacewatch | TIR | 2.0 km | MPC · JPL |
| 835032 | 2011 AD_{101} | — | January 14, 2011 | Kitt Peak | Spacewatch | · | 940 m | MPC · JPL |
| 835033 | 2011 AC_{102} | — | January 2, 2011 | Mount Lemmon | Mount Lemmon Survey | · | 1.6 km | MPC · JPL |
| 835034 | 2011 AK_{102} | — | January 12, 2011 | Mount Lemmon | Mount Lemmon Survey | NYS | 600 m | MPC · JPL |
| 835035 | 2011 AP_{104} | — | January 12, 2011 | Mount Lemmon | Mount Lemmon Survey | VER | 2.0 km | MPC · JPL |
| 835036 | 2011 AK_{106} | — | January 2, 2011 | Mount Lemmon | Mount Lemmon Survey | MAS | 420 m | MPC · JPL |
| 835037 | 2011 AB_{107} | — | January 8, 2011 | Mount Lemmon | Mount Lemmon Survey | EOS | 1.5 km | MPC · JPL |
| 835038 | 2011 AY_{107} | — | January 3, 2011 | Mount Lemmon | Mount Lemmon Survey | THM | 1.6 km | MPC · JPL |
| 835039 | 2011 AR_{109} | — | January 14, 2011 | Mount Lemmon | Mount Lemmon Survey | · | 800 m | MPC · JPL |
| 835040 | 2011 AB_{110} | — | January 14, 2011 | Kitt Peak | Spacewatch | · | 1.9 km | MPC · JPL |
| 835041 | 2011 AC_{110} | — | January 14, 2011 | Mount Lemmon | Mount Lemmon Survey | · | 1.7 km | MPC · JPL |
| 835042 | 2011 AS_{110} | — | January 2, 2011 | Mount Lemmon | Mount Lemmon Survey | · | 600 m | MPC · JPL |
| 835043 | 2011 BT_{1} | — | January 16, 2011 | Mount Lemmon | Mount Lemmon Survey | · | 1.9 km | MPC · JPL |
| 835044 | 2011 BO_{7} | — | December 14, 2010 | Westfield | International Astronomical Search Collaboration | · | 2.0 km | MPC · JPL |
| 835045 | 2011 BP_{11} | — | January 23, 2011 | Mount Lemmon | Mount Lemmon Survey | · | 2.4 km | MPC · JPL |
| 835046 | 2011 BS_{18} | — | January 26, 2011 | Kachina | Hobart, J. | · | 560 m | MPC · JPL |
| 835047 | 2011 BT_{18} | — | January 24, 2011 | Alder Springs | K. Levin, N. Teamo | · | 2.2 km | MPC · JPL |
| 835048 | 2011 BZ_{29} | — | December 8, 2010 | Mount Lemmon | Mount Lemmon Survey | · | 2.3 km | MPC · JPL |
| 835049 | 2011 BH_{33} | — | January 27, 2011 | Mount Lemmon | Mount Lemmon Survey | · | 2.2 km | MPC · JPL |
| 835050 | 2011 BO_{34} | — | January 28, 2011 | Mount Lemmon | Mount Lemmon Survey | NYS | 590 m | MPC · JPL |
| 835051 | 2011 BL_{37} | — | February 6, 2007 | Mount Lemmon | Mount Lemmon Survey | · | 730 m | MPC · JPL |
| 835052 | 2011 BZ_{43} | — | August 16, 2009 | Kitt Peak | Spacewatch | · | 1.1 km | MPC · JPL |
| 835053 | 2011 BS_{45} | — | March 17, 1993 | La Silla | UESAC | · | 1.2 km | MPC · JPL |
| 835054 | 2011 BW_{46} | — | September 26, 2000 | Sacramento Peak | SDSS | EUN | 1.2 km | MPC · JPL |
| 835055 | 2011 BO_{49} | — | January 31, 2011 | Piszkés-tető | K. Sárneczky, Z. Kuli | · | 770 m | MPC · JPL |
| 835056 | 2011 BW_{49} | — | March 14, 2004 | Kitt Peak | Spacewatch | · | 720 m | MPC · JPL |
| 835057 | 2011 BO_{52} | — | January 30, 2011 | Mount Lemmon | Mount Lemmon Survey | · | 1.4 km | MPC · JPL |
| 835058 | 2011 BX_{54} | — | January 11, 2011 | Kitt Peak | Spacewatch | · | 640 m | MPC · JPL |
| 835059 | 2011 BH_{55} | — | January 30, 2011 | Mayhill-ISON | L. Elenin | · | 1.3 km | MPC · JPL |
| 835060 | 2011 BS_{55} | — | December 5, 2010 | Mount Lemmon | Mount Lemmon Survey | · | 760 m | MPC · JPL |
| 835061 | 2011 BU_{55} | — | March 20, 1999 | Sacramento Peak | SDSS | · | 990 m | MPC · JPL |
| 835062 | 2011 BE_{64} | — | January 28, 2011 | Mount Lemmon | Mount Lemmon Survey | VER | 2.1 km | MPC · JPL |
| 835063 | 2011 BX_{65} | — | January 10, 2011 | Kitt Peak | Spacewatch | T_{j} (2.99) | 3.0 km | MPC · JPL |
| 835064 | 2011 BO_{72} | — | February 5, 2011 | Haleakala | Pan-STARRS 1 | ELF | 2.4 km | MPC · JPL |
| 835065 | 2011 BK_{73} | — | November 19, 2009 | Mount Lemmon | Mount Lemmon Survey | · | 1.9 km | MPC · JPL |
| 835066 | 2011 BG_{77} | — | October 12, 1999 | Socorro | LINEAR | T_{j} (2.92) | 2.7 km | MPC · JPL |
| 835067 | 2011 BY_{82} | — | January 15, 2011 | Mount Lemmon | Mount Lemmon Survey | H | 390 m | MPC · JPL |
| 835068 | 2011 BK_{86} | — | January 27, 2011 | Mount Lemmon | Mount Lemmon Survey | · | 470 m | MPC · JPL |
| 835069 | 2011 BR_{89} | — | December 9, 2010 | Mount Lemmon | Mount Lemmon Survey | · | 2.1 km | MPC · JPL |
| 835070 | 2011 BD_{91} | — | September 16, 2009 | Mount Lemmon | Mount Lemmon Survey | · | 3.5 km | MPC · JPL |
| 835071 | 2011 BK_{95} | — | January 23, 2006 | Kitt Peak | Spacewatch | · | 1.3 km | MPC · JPL |
| 835072 | 2011 BR_{96} | — | January 29, 2011 | Mount Lemmon | Mount Lemmon Survey | H | 340 m | MPC · JPL |
| 835073 | 2011 BP_{98} | — | January 29, 2011 | Mount Lemmon | Mount Lemmon Survey | · | 830 m | MPC · JPL |
| 835074 | 2011 BL_{99} | — | January 30, 2011 | Piszkés-tető | K. Sárneczky, Z. Kuli | · | 2.1 km | MPC · JPL |
| 835075 | 2011 BV_{117} | — | January 13, 2011 | Mount Lemmon | Mount Lemmon Survey | H | 330 m | MPC · JPL |
| 835076 | 2011 BD_{120} | — | January 28, 2011 | Mount Lemmon | Mount Lemmon Survey | · | 1.8 km | MPC · JPL |
| 835077 | 2011 BL_{121} | — | January 30, 2011 | Mount Lemmon | Mount Lemmon Survey | · | 680 m | MPC · JPL |
| 835078 | 2011 BX_{125} | — | January 27, 2011 | Mount Lemmon | Mount Lemmon Survey | DOR | 2.0 km | MPC · JPL |
| 835079 | 2011 BO_{126} | — | January 8, 2010 | WISE | WISE | · | 1.6 km | MPC · JPL |
| 835080 | 2011 BK_{127} | — | October 13, 1999 | Sacramento Peak | SDSS | · | 1.7 km | MPC · JPL |
| 835081 | 2011 BF_{128} | — | January 28, 2011 | Mount Lemmon | Mount Lemmon Survey | · | 1.5 km | MPC · JPL |
| 835082 | 2011 BD_{130} | — | January 28, 2011 | Mount Lemmon | Mount Lemmon Survey | · | 2.2 km | MPC · JPL |
| 835083 | 2011 BV_{130} | — | January 28, 2011 | Mount Lemmon | Mount Lemmon Survey | · | 1.8 km | MPC · JPL |
| 835084 | 2011 BQ_{134} | — | January 29, 2011 | Mount Lemmon | Mount Lemmon Survey | · | 1.5 km | MPC · JPL |
| 835085 | 2011 BO_{144} | — | March 6, 2008 | Mount Lemmon | Mount Lemmon Survey | · | 560 m | MPC · JPL |
| 835086 | 2011 BT_{146} | — | January 29, 2011 | Mount Lemmon | Mount Lemmon Survey | · | 730 m | MPC · JPL |
| 835087 | 2011 BS_{147} | — | January 29, 2011 | Mount Lemmon | Mount Lemmon Survey | · | 540 m | MPC · JPL |
| 835088 | 2011 BY_{148} | — | October 16, 2009 | Mount Lemmon | Mount Lemmon Survey | · | 1.0 km | MPC · JPL |
| 835089 | 2011 BT_{152} | — | January 29, 2011 | Kitt Peak | Spacewatch | · | 850 m | MPC · JPL |
| 835090 | 2011 BG_{157} | — | January 28, 2011 | Mount Lemmon | Mount Lemmon Survey | · | 2.2 km | MPC · JPL |
| 835091 | 2011 BN_{158} | — | January 29, 2011 | Mount Lemmon | Mount Lemmon Survey | · | 1.9 km | MPC · JPL |
| 835092 | 2011 BP_{158} | — | September 19, 1998 | Sacramento Peak | SDSS | · | 1.9 km | MPC · JPL |
| 835093 | 2011 BP_{159} | — | January 29, 2011 | Mount Lemmon | Mount Lemmon Survey | · | 810 m | MPC · JPL |
| 835094 | 2011 BZ_{159} | — | January 29, 2011 | Mount Lemmon | Mount Lemmon Survey | · | 1.5 km | MPC · JPL |
| 835095 | 2011 BM_{163} | — | February 4, 2006 | Kitt Peak | Spacewatch | · | 1.5 km | MPC · JPL |
| 835096 | 2011 BA_{164} | — | March 14, 2011 | Mount Lemmon | Mount Lemmon Survey | H | 340 m | MPC · JPL |
| 835097 | 2011 BX_{165} | — | January 16, 2011 | Mount Lemmon | Mount Lemmon Survey | · | 1.1 km | MPC · JPL |
| 835098 | 2011 BD_{167} | — | February 10, 2011 | Mount Lemmon | Mount Lemmon Survey | · | 730 m | MPC · JPL |
| 835099 | 2011 BL_{168} | — | March 30, 2011 | Haleakala | Pan-STARRS 1 | · | 2.5 km | MPC · JPL |
| 835100 | 2011 BV_{168} | — | February 8, 2011 | Mount Lemmon | Mount Lemmon Survey | · | 800 m | MPC · JPL |

== 835101–835200 ==
back to top

| Designation | | | Discovery | | | Properties | | Ref |
| Permanent | Provisional | Named after | Date | Site | Discoverer(s) | Category | Diam. | Ref |
|---|---|---|---|---|---|---|---|---|
| 835101 | 2011 BH_{169} | — | February 7, 2011 | Mount Lemmon | Mount Lemmon Survey | EOS | 1.5 km | MPC · JPL |
| 835102 | 2011 BU_{169} | — | January 23, 2011 | Mount Lemmon | Mount Lemmon Survey | · | 530 m | MPC · JPL |
| 835103 | 2011 BB_{171} | — | January 26, 2011 | Mount Lemmon | Mount Lemmon Survey | (5) | 930 m | MPC · JPL |
| 835104 | 2011 BH_{171} | — | January 16, 2011 | Mount Lemmon | Mount Lemmon Survey | · | 2.5 km | MPC · JPL |
| 835105 | 2011 BN_{172} | — | January 26, 2011 | Catalina | CSS | H | 400 m | MPC · JPL |
| 835106 | 2011 BX_{173} | — | February 5, 2011 | Mount Lemmon | Mount Lemmon Survey | · | 880 m | MPC · JPL |
| 835107 | 2011 BJ_{174} | — | January 15, 2015 | Haleakala | Pan-STARRS 1 | MAR | 780 m | MPC · JPL |
| 835108 | 2011 BE_{176} | — | November 2, 2015 | Haleakala | Pan-STARRS 1 | TIR | 2.1 km | MPC · JPL |
| 835109 | 2011 BR_{177} | — | February 8, 2011 | Mount Lemmon | Mount Lemmon Survey | JUN | 570 m | MPC · JPL |
| 835110 | 2011 BX_{177} | — | October 30, 2013 | Haleakala | Pan-STARRS 1 | · | 510 m | MPC · JPL |
| 835111 | 2011 BE_{179} | — | January 16, 2011 | Mount Lemmon | Mount Lemmon Survey | · | 1.7 km | MPC · JPL |
| 835112 | 2011 BF_{179} | — | February 5, 2011 | Haleakala | Pan-STARRS 1 | V | 370 m | MPC · JPL |
| 835113 | 2011 BC_{181} | — | January 29, 2011 | Kitt Peak | Spacewatch | · | 1.1 km | MPC · JPL |
| 835114 | 2011 BR_{182} | — | February 16, 2015 | Haleakala | Pan-STARRS 1 | · | 820 m | MPC · JPL |
| 835115 | 2011 BL_{183} | — | January 15, 2010 | WISE | WISE | · | 1.6 km | MPC · JPL |
| 835116 | 2011 BN_{184} | — | September 20, 2014 | Haleakala | Pan-STARRS 1 | · | 1.7 km | MPC · JPL |
| 835117 | 2011 BQ_{184} | — | February 9, 2016 | Haleakala | Pan-STARRS 1 | · | 2.1 km | MPC · JPL |
| 835118 | 2011 BM_{186} | — | April 29, 2012 | Kitt Peak | Spacewatch | · | 1.7 km | MPC · JPL |
| 835119 | 2011 BR_{186} | — | January 25, 2011 | Mount Lemmon | Mount Lemmon Survey | · | 1.1 km | MPC · JPL |
| 835120 | 2011 BD_{187} | — | October 22, 2017 | Mount Lemmon | Mount Lemmon Survey | MAR | 700 m | MPC · JPL |
| 835121 | 2011 BB_{188} | — | January 27, 2017 | Mount Lemmon | Mount Lemmon Survey | ELF | 2.6 km | MPC · JPL |
| 835122 | 2011 BF_{188} | — | September 6, 2014 | Catalina | CSS | · | 2.2 km | MPC · JPL |
| 835123 | 2011 BN_{188} | — | February 5, 2011 | Mount Lemmon | Mount Lemmon Survey | · | 2.9 km | MPC · JPL |
| 835124 | 2011 BQ_{188} | — | January 28, 2011 | Mount Lemmon | Mount Lemmon Survey | · | 2.1 km | MPC · JPL |
| 835125 | 2011 BD_{189} | — | March 18, 2017 | Mount Lemmon | Mount Lemmon Survey | · | 1.9 km | MPC · JPL |
| 835126 | 2011 BG_{189} | — | August 12, 2012 | Siding Spring | SSS | · | 680 m | MPC · JPL |
| 835127 | 2011 BM_{189} | — | January 30, 2011 | Mount Lemmon | Mount Lemmon Survey | · | 830 m | MPC · JPL |
| 835128 | 2011 BR_{190} | — | February 5, 2011 | Haleakala | Pan-STARRS 1 | · | 890 m | MPC · JPL |
| 835129 | 2011 BT_{190} | — | January 27, 2011 | Mount Lemmon | Mount Lemmon Survey | · | 2.0 km | MPC · JPL |
| 835130 | 2011 BL_{191} | — | January 27, 2011 | Mount Lemmon | Mount Lemmon Survey | · | 2.9 km | MPC · JPL |
| 835131 | 2011 BP_{191} | — | February 25, 2011 | Mount Lemmon | Mount Lemmon Survey | EOS | 1.5 km | MPC · JPL |
| 835132 | 2011 BM_{192} | — | April 13, 2015 | Mount Lemmon | Mount Lemmon Survey | · | 510 m | MPC · JPL |
| 835133 | 2011 BT_{192} | — | November 20, 2014 | Haleakala | Pan-STARRS 1 | · | 1.6 km | MPC · JPL |
| 835134 | 2011 BD_{193} | — | June 20, 2013 | Haleakala | Pan-STARRS 1 | TIR | 2.4 km | MPC · JPL |
| 835135 | 2011 BF_{193} | — | September 3, 2013 | Kitt Peak | Spacewatch | CLA | 1.2 km | MPC · JPL |
| 835136 | 2011 BG_{193} | — | January 26, 2017 | Haleakala | Pan-STARRS 1 | · | 2.2 km | MPC · JPL |
| 835137 | 2011 BB_{195} | — | January 30, 2011 | Mount Lemmon | Mount Lemmon Survey | · | 910 m | MPC · JPL |
| 835138 | 2011 BG_{196} | — | January 30, 2011 | Mount Lemmon | Mount Lemmon Survey | (1547) | 950 m | MPC · JPL |
| 835139 | 2011 BU_{196} | — | January 26, 2011 | Mount Lemmon | Mount Lemmon Survey | · | 1.7 km | MPC · JPL |
| 835140 | 2011 BF_{197} | — | January 26, 2011 | Mount Lemmon | Mount Lemmon Survey | · | 2.7 km | MPC · JPL |
| 835141 | 2011 BA_{198} | — | January 28, 2011 | Mount Lemmon | Mount Lemmon Survey | · | 1.7 km | MPC · JPL |
| 835142 | 2011 BQ_{198} | — | January 30, 2011 | Mount Lemmon | Mount Lemmon Survey | · | 1.1 km | MPC · JPL |
| 835143 | 2011 BV_{198} | — | January 26, 2011 | Mount Lemmon | Mount Lemmon Survey | · | 1.8 km | MPC · JPL |
| 835144 | 2011 BN_{199} | — | January 16, 2011 | Mount Lemmon | Mount Lemmon Survey | · | 1.4 km | MPC · JPL |
| 835145 | 2011 BO_{199} | — | January 28, 2011 | Mount Lemmon | Mount Lemmon Survey | ELF | 2.6 km | MPC · JPL |
| 835146 | 2011 BZ_{200} | — | January 28, 2011 | Mount Lemmon | Mount Lemmon Survey | · | 480 m | MPC · JPL |
| 835147 | 2011 BB_{203} | — | January 30, 2011 | Haleakala | Pan-STARRS 1 | · | 850 m | MPC · JPL |
| 835148 | 2011 BL_{205} | — | January 28, 2011 | Kitt Peak | Spacewatch | VER | 2.0 km | MPC · JPL |
| 835149 | 2011 CE_{10} | — | March 20, 1999 | Sacramento Peak | SDSS | (5) | 860 m | MPC · JPL |
| 835150 | 2011 CC_{12} | — | February 5, 2011 | Mount Lemmon | Mount Lemmon Survey | MAS | 620 m | MPC · JPL |
| 835151 | 2011 CC_{15} | — | October 15, 2004 | Mount Lemmon | Mount Lemmon Survey | · | 1.4 km | MPC · JPL |
| 835152 | 2011 CF_{24} | — | September 28, 2003 | Sacramento Peak | SDSS | · | 2.7 km | MPC · JPL |
| 835153 | 2011 CP_{28} | — | February 5, 2011 | Catalina | CSS | · | 1.1 km | MPC · JPL |
| 835154 | 2011 CK_{38} | — | February 5, 2011 | Mount Lemmon | Mount Lemmon Survey | H | 340 m | MPC · JPL |
| 835155 | 2011 CM_{38} | — | May 14, 2008 | Kitt Peak | Spacewatch | · | 790 m | MPC · JPL |
| 835156 | 2011 CV_{39} | — | January 27, 2011 | Mount Lemmon | Mount Lemmon Survey | ERI | 830 m | MPC · JPL |
| 835157 | 2011 CP_{43} | — | January 14, 2011 | Kitt Peak | Spacewatch | · | 820 m | MPC · JPL |
| 835158 | 2011 CR_{45} | — | February 8, 2011 | Mount Lemmon | Mount Lemmon Survey | · | 1.9 km | MPC · JPL |
| 835159 | 2011 CP_{53} | — | January 30, 2011 | Kitt Peak | Spacewatch | · | 980 m | MPC · JPL |
| 835160 | 2011 CX_{55} | — | February 8, 2011 | Mount Lemmon | Mount Lemmon Survey | V | 410 m | MPC · JPL |
| 835161 | 2011 CN_{56} | — | October 2, 2009 | Mount Lemmon | Mount Lemmon Survey | · | 1.9 km | MPC · JPL |
| 835162 | 2011 CP_{61} | — | February 8, 2011 | Mount Lemmon | Mount Lemmon Survey | NYS | 990 m | MPC · JPL |
| 835163 | 2011 CD_{65} | — | January 10, 2011 | Zelenchukskaya | T. V. Krjačko, B. Satovski | · | 1.8 km | MPC · JPL |
| 835164 | 2011 CV_{66} | — | January 12, 2011 | Mount Lemmon | Mount Lemmon Survey | TIR | 2.1 km | MPC · JPL |
| 835165 | 2011 CJ_{67} | — | February 3, 2010 | WISE | WISE | · | 3.6 km | MPC · JPL |
| 835166 | 2011 CM_{69} | — | January 16, 2011 | Mount Lemmon | Mount Lemmon Survey | · | 2.7 km | MPC · JPL |
| 835167 | 2011 CX_{86} | — | February 11, 2011 | Mount Lemmon | Mount Lemmon Survey | · | 1.2 km | MPC · JPL |
| 835168 | 2011 CV_{89} | — | February 26, 2010 | WISE | WISE | · | 2.3 km | MPC · JPL |
| 835169 | 2011 CQ_{93} | — | March 2, 2011 | Mount Lemmon | Mount Lemmon Survey | · | 1.8 km | MPC · JPL |
| 835170 | 2011 CG_{97} | — | February 12, 2011 | Mount Lemmon | Mount Lemmon Survey | · | 750 m | MPC · JPL |
| 835171 | 2011 CO_{97} | — | November 10, 2009 | Kitt Peak | Spacewatch | VER | 1.9 km | MPC · JPL |
| 835172 | 2011 CW_{99} | — | February 15, 2010 | WISE | WISE | · | 1.5 km | MPC · JPL |
| 835173 | 2011 CQ_{101} | — | February 5, 2011 | Haleakala | Pan-STARRS 1 | · | 990 m | MPC · JPL |
| 835174 | 2011 CB_{102} | — | March 6, 2011 | Mount Lemmon | Mount Lemmon Survey | · | 770 m | MPC · JPL |
| 835175 | 2011 CL_{108} | — | February 5, 2011 | Haleakala | Pan-STARRS 1 | · | 2.3 km | MPC · JPL |
| 835176 | 2011 CT_{111} | — | September 28, 2009 | Kitt Peak | Spacewatch | · | 1.9 km | MPC · JPL |
| 835177 | 2011 CV_{111} | — | January 27, 2011 | Kitt Peak | Spacewatch | · | 970 m | MPC · JPL |
| 835178 | 2011 CN_{114} | — | November 24, 2009 | Kitt Peak | Spacewatch | · | 3.9 km | MPC · JPL |
| 835179 | 2011 CQ_{120} | — | February 8, 2011 | Mount Lemmon | Mount Lemmon Survey | · | 830 m | MPC · JPL |
| 835180 | 2011 CZ_{123} | — | March 1, 2010 | WISE | WISE | · | 1.9 km | MPC · JPL |
| 835181 | 2011 CG_{124} | — | February 7, 2011 | Mount Lemmon | Mount Lemmon Survey | · | 1.4 km | MPC · JPL |
| 835182 | 2011 CJ_{124} | — | February 13, 2011 | Mount Lemmon | Mount Lemmon Survey | · | 2.4 km | MPC · JPL |
| 835183 | 2011 CC_{125} | — | February 13, 2011 | Mount Lemmon | Mount Lemmon Survey | NYS | 820 m | MPC · JPL |
| 835184 | 2011 CF_{125} | — | September 27, 2009 | Mount Lemmon | Mount Lemmon Survey | · | 1.3 km | MPC · JPL |
| 835185 | 2011 CQ_{125} | — | February 13, 2011 | Mount Lemmon | Mount Lemmon Survey | · | 640 m | MPC · JPL |
| 835186 | 2011 CZ_{125} | — | January 12, 2010 | WISE | WISE | · | 1.4 km | MPC · JPL |
| 835187 | 2011 CE_{129} | — | February 13, 2011 | Mount Lemmon | Mount Lemmon Survey | · | 950 m | MPC · JPL |
| 835188 | 2011 CQ_{129} | — | February 8, 2011 | Mount Lemmon | Mount Lemmon Survey | · | 820 m | MPC · JPL |
| 835189 | 2011 CY_{131} | — | February 10, 2011 | Mount Lemmon | Mount Lemmon Survey | H | 280 m | MPC · JPL |
| 835190 | 2011 CS_{132} | — | February 7, 2011 | Mount Lemmon | Mount Lemmon Survey | · | 730 m | MPC · JPL |
| 835191 | 2011 CR_{134} | — | February 10, 2011 | Mount Lemmon | Mount Lemmon Survey | · | 830 m | MPC · JPL |
| 835192 | 2011 CO_{135} | — | February 5, 2011 | Mount Lemmon | Mount Lemmon Survey | · | 860 m | MPC · JPL |
| 835193 | 2011 CZ_{135} | — | February 5, 2011 | Catalina | CSS | · | 460 m | MPC · JPL |
| 835194 | 2011 CO_{137} | — | July 25, 2014 | Haleakala | Pan-STARRS 1 | · | 2.0 km | MPC · JPL |
| 835195 | 2011 CF_{139} | — | July 29, 2008 | Kitt Peak | Spacewatch | · | 2.0 km | MPC · JPL |
| 835196 | 2011 CG_{141} | — | February 5, 2011 | Mount Lemmon | Mount Lemmon Survey | · | 1.2 km | MPC · JPL |
| 835197 | 2011 CG_{143} | — | February 7, 2011 | Mount Lemmon | Mount Lemmon Survey | · | 1.2 km | MPC · JPL |
| 835198 | 2011 CV_{143} | — | February 11, 2011 | Mount Lemmon | Mount Lemmon Survey | · | 560 m | MPC · JPL |
| 835199 | 2011 CA_{147} | — | February 13, 2011 | Mount Lemmon | Mount Lemmon Survey | · | 2.0 km | MPC · JPL |
| 835200 | 2011 CC_{147} | — | February 5, 2011 | Haleakala | Pan-STARRS 1 | · | 1.7 km | MPC · JPL |

== 835201–835300 ==
back to top

| Designation | | | Discovery | | | Properties | | Ref |
| Permanent | Provisional | Named after | Date | Site | Discoverer(s) | Category | Diam. | Ref |
|---|---|---|---|---|---|---|---|---|
| 835201 | 2011 CR_{148} | — | February 10, 2011 | Mount Lemmon | Mount Lemmon Survey | · | 920 m | MPC · JPL |
| 835202 | 2011 CF_{151} | — | February 10, 2011 | Mount Lemmon | Mount Lemmon Survey | · | 2.0 km | MPC · JPL |
| 835203 | 2011 DG | — | January 16, 2011 | Mount Lemmon | Mount Lemmon Survey | · | 1.3 km | MPC · JPL |
| 835204 | 2011 DS_{6} | — | February 25, 2011 | Mount Lemmon | Mount Lemmon Survey | · | 500 m | MPC · JPL |
| 835205 | 2011 DG_{7} | — | February 25, 2011 | Mount Lemmon | Mount Lemmon Survey | HYG | 1.8 km | MPC · JPL |
| 835206 | 2011 DS_{7} | — | February 25, 2011 | Mount Lemmon | Mount Lemmon Survey | · | 500 m | MPC · JPL |
| 835207 | 2011 DX_{7} | — | February 22, 2011 | Kitt Peak | Spacewatch | · | 1.3 km | MPC · JPL |
| 835208 | 2011 DX_{13} | — | January 29, 2011 | Sandlot | G. Hug | · | 1.1 km | MPC · JPL |
| 835209 | 2011 DJ_{14} | — | February 25, 2011 | Mount Lemmon | Mount Lemmon Survey | · | 1.6 km | MPC · JPL |
| 835210 | 2011 DB_{17} | — | February 25, 2011 | Mount Lemmon | Mount Lemmon Survey | · | 1.1 km | MPC · JPL |
| 835211 | 2011 DH_{20} | — | February 23, 2011 | Kitt Peak | Spacewatch | H | 540 m | MPC · JPL |
| 835212 | 2011 DN_{34} | — | January 17, 2007 | Kitt Peak | Spacewatch | NYS | 1.0 km | MPC · JPL |
| 835213 | 2011 DV_{34} | — | February 25, 2011 | Mount Lemmon | Mount Lemmon Survey | · | 650 m | MPC · JPL |
| 835214 | 2011 DP_{35} | — | February 25, 2011 | Mount Lemmon | Mount Lemmon Survey | · | 2.4 km | MPC · JPL |
| 835215 | 2011 DZ_{35} | — | February 25, 2011 | Mount Lemmon | Mount Lemmon Survey | NYS | 620 m | MPC · JPL |
| 835216 | 2011 DN_{40} | — | February 25, 2011 | Mount Lemmon | Mount Lemmon Survey | · | 590 m | MPC · JPL |
| 835217 | 2011 DS_{40} | — | February 25, 2011 | Mount Lemmon | Mount Lemmon Survey | · | 510 m | MPC · JPL |
| 835218 | 2011 DG_{44} | — | February 26, 2011 | Mount Lemmon | Mount Lemmon Survey | · | 930 m | MPC · JPL |
| 835219 | 2011 DB_{45} | — | January 4, 2010 | Kitt Peak | Spacewatch | 3:2 | 4.1 km | MPC · JPL |
| 835220 | 2011 DJ_{48} | — | October 5, 2002 | Sacramento Peak | SDSS | · | 3.4 km | MPC · JPL |
| 835221 | 2011 DP_{48} | — | February 26, 2011 | Mount Lemmon | Mount Lemmon Survey | ADE | 1.5 km | MPC · JPL |
| 835222 | 2011 DY_{52} | — | February 25, 2011 | Kitt Peak | Spacewatch | H | 410 m | MPC · JPL |
| 835223 | 2011 DH_{54} | — | January 20, 2015 | Mount Lemmon | Mount Lemmon Survey | HNS | 700 m | MPC · JPL |
| 835224 | 2011 DR_{55} | — | February 23, 2011 | Kitt Peak | Spacewatch | · | 2.2 km | MPC · JPL |
| 835225 | 2011 DA_{56} | — | February 26, 2011 | Mount Lemmon | Mount Lemmon Survey | · | 1.5 km | MPC · JPL |
| 835226 | 2011 DJ_{56} | — | February 26, 2011 | Catalina | CSS | JUN | 790 m | MPC · JPL |
| 835227 | 2011 DK_{57} | — | February 25, 2011 | Kitt Peak | Spacewatch | · | 600 m | MPC · JPL |
| 835228 | 2011 DB_{58} | — | February 25, 2011 | Mount Lemmon | Mount Lemmon Survey | · | 2.1 km | MPC · JPL |
| 835229 | 2011 DU_{58} | — | February 25, 2011 | Mount Lemmon | Mount Lemmon Survey | · | 1.3 km | MPC · JPL |
| 835230 | 2011 DO_{59} | — | February 25, 2011 | Mount Lemmon | Mount Lemmon Survey | · | 930 m | MPC · JPL |
| 835231 | 2011 EZ_{1} | — | March 1, 2011 | Mount Lemmon | Mount Lemmon Survey | · | 1.2 km | MPC · JPL |
| 835232 | 2011 EL_{2} | — | February 12, 2000 | Sacramento Peak | SDSS | · | 2.0 km | MPC · JPL |
| 835233 | 2011 ES_{14} | — | March 4, 2011 | Andrushivka | P. Kyrylenko, Y. Ivaščenko | · | 1.2 km | MPC · JPL |
| 835234 | 2011 ES_{18} | — | April 25, 2006 | Kitt Peak | Spacewatch | · | 2.1 km | MPC · JPL |
| 835235 | 2011 EO_{23} | — | February 11, 2011 | Catalina | CSS | H | 480 m | MPC · JPL |
| 835236 | 2011 EV_{30} | — | December 10, 2010 | Kitt Peak | Spacewatch | · | 2.9 km | MPC · JPL |
| 835237 | 2011 EB_{31} | — | March 5, 2011 | Catalina | CSS | PHO | 630 m | MPC · JPL |
| 835238 | 2011 EG_{31} | — | March 5, 2011 | Catalina | CSS | (69559) | 2.8 km | MPC · JPL |
| 835239 | 2011 EM_{31} | — | February 4, 2000 | Kitt Peak | Spacewatch | MAS | 650 m | MPC · JPL |
| 835240 | 2011 EO_{34} | — | March 4, 2011 | Mount Lemmon | Mount Lemmon Survey | THM | 1.5 km | MPC · JPL |
| 835241 | 2011 EG_{37} | — | March 6, 2011 | Kitt Peak | Spacewatch | · | 2.0 km | MPC · JPL |
| 835242 | 2011 EZ_{45} | — | February 13, 2010 | WISE | WISE | EUP | 2.9 km | MPC · JPL |
| 835243 | 2011 EA_{47} | — | January 27, 2010 | WISE | WISE | · | 2.7 km | MPC · JPL |
| 835244 | 2011 EN_{56} | — | March 12, 2011 | Mount Lemmon | Mount Lemmon Survey | · | 2.2 km | MPC · JPL |
| 835245 | 2011 EP_{57} | — | March 12, 2011 | Mount Lemmon | Mount Lemmon Survey | · | 1.3 km | MPC · JPL |
| 835246 | 2011 ED_{60} | — | March 12, 2011 | Mount Lemmon | Mount Lemmon Survey | · | 1.1 km | MPC · JPL |
| 835247 | 2011 EO_{60} | — | February 25, 2010 | WISE | WISE | LUT | 3.2 km | MPC · JPL |
| 835248 | 2011 EK_{61} | — | March 12, 2011 | Mount Lemmon | Mount Lemmon Survey | · | 1.0 km | MPC · JPL |
| 835249 | 2011 EW_{63} | — | March 8, 2010 | WISE | WISE | · | 2.7 km | MPC · JPL |
| 835250 | 2011 EJ_{72} | — | March 11, 2011 | Kitt Peak | Spacewatch | · | 930 m | MPC · JPL |
| 835251 | 2011 EL_{77} | — | September 28, 2003 | Sacramento Peak | SDSS | T_{j} (2.97) | 2.9 km | MPC · JPL |
| 835252 | 2011 EJ_{85} | — | February 13, 2004 | Kitt Peak | Spacewatch | · | 470 m | MPC · JPL |
| 835253 | 2011 EL_{85} | — | February 1, 2010 | WISE | WISE | EUP | 2.4 km | MPC · JPL |
| 835254 | 2011 EK_{88} | — | April 16, 2010 | WISE | WISE | · | 2.5 km | MPC · JPL |
| 835255 | 2011 EO_{89} | — | March 5, 2011 | Mount Lemmon | Mount Lemmon Survey | · | 1.7 km | MPC · JPL |
| 835256 | 2011 EC_{93} | — | March 10, 2011 | XuYi | PMO NEO Survey Program | H | 470 m | MPC · JPL |
| 835257 | 2011 EE_{93} | — | March 5, 2011 | Catalina | CSS | · | 1.2 km | MPC · JPL |
| 835258 | 2011 EL_{93} | — | January 28, 2007 | Mount Lemmon | Mount Lemmon Survey | · | 760 m | MPC · JPL |
| 835259 | 2011 EE_{94} | — | March 11, 2011 | Kitt Peak | Spacewatch | (1118) | 2.6 km | MPC · JPL |
| 835260 | 2011 EA_{97} | — | August 27, 2014 | Haleakala | Pan-STARRS 1 | · | 2.5 km | MPC · JPL |
| 835261 | 2011 ED_{97} | — | January 15, 2010 | WISE | WISE | · | 1.7 km | MPC · JPL |
| 835262 | 2011 EV_{97} | — | March 10, 2011 | Kitt Peak | Spacewatch | · | 890 m | MPC · JPL |
| 835263 | 2011 ED_{98} | — | January 23, 2015 | Haleakala | Pan-STARRS 1 | · | 900 m | MPC · JPL |
| 835264 | 2011 EK_{98} | — | March 6, 2011 | Kitt Peak | Spacewatch | · | 880 m | MPC · JPL |
| 835265 | 2011 EU_{98} | — | December 31, 2013 | Mount Lemmon | Mount Lemmon Survey | · | 530 m | MPC · JPL |
| 835266 | 2011 EQ_{102} | — | March 10, 2011 | Kitt Peak | Spacewatch | · | 1.3 km | MPC · JPL |
| 835267 | 2011 EH_{103} | — | March 6, 2011 | Mount Lemmon | Mount Lemmon Survey | (5) | 720 m | MPC · JPL |
| 835268 | 2011 EP_{103} | — | March 6, 2011 | Mount Lemmon | Mount Lemmon Survey | · | 2.1 km | MPC · JPL |
| 835269 | 2011 ES_{106} | — | March 11, 2011 | Mount Lemmon | Mount Lemmon Survey | · | 640 m | MPC · JPL |
| 835270 | 2011 EU_{109} | — | March 13, 2011 | Mount Lemmon | Mount Lemmon Survey | · | 1.2 km | MPC · JPL |
| 835271 | 2011 EF_{110} | — | March 9, 2011 | Mount Lemmon | Mount Lemmon Survey | · | 520 m | MPC · JPL |
| 835272 | 2011 EL_{115} | — | March 4, 2011 | Mount Lemmon | Mount Lemmon Survey | · | 460 m | MPC · JPL |
| 835273 | 2011 EQ_{115} | — | March 2, 2011 | Kitt Peak | Spacewatch | · | 2.0 km | MPC · JPL |
| 835274 | 2011 FZ_{20} | — | March 29, 2011 | Mount Lemmon | Mount Lemmon Survey | · | 920 m | MPC · JPL |
| 835275 | 2011 FT_{22} | — | January 28, 2010 | WISE | WISE | · | 2.8 km | MPC · JPL |
| 835276 | 2011 FO_{26} | — | March 30, 2011 | Piszkés-tető | K. Sárneczky, Z. Kuli | · | 1.0 km | MPC · JPL |
| 835277 | 2011 FC_{27} | — | February 17, 2010 | WISE | WISE | · | 2.8 km | MPC · JPL |
| 835278 | 2011 FO_{28} | — | March 27, 2010 | WISE | WISE | T_{j} (2.98) | 3.5 km | MPC · JPL |
| 835279 | 2011 FL_{31} | — | October 5, 2002 | Sacramento Peak | SDSS | · | 810 m | MPC · JPL |
| 835280 | 2011 FH_{32} | — | October 10, 2002 | Sacramento Peak | SDSS | · | 3.1 km | MPC · JPL |
| 835281 | 2011 FF_{35} | — | March 29, 2011 | Kitt Peak | Spacewatch | · | 880 m | MPC · JPL |
| 835282 | 2011 FW_{36} | — | March 29, 2011 | Mount Lemmon | Mount Lemmon Survey | · | 960 m | MPC · JPL |
| 835283 | 2011 FC_{38} | — | March 30, 2011 | Mount Lemmon | Mount Lemmon Survey | · | 1.2 km | MPC · JPL |
| 835284 | 2011 FA_{40} | — | March 30, 2011 | Mount Lemmon | Mount Lemmon Survey | · | 1.0 km | MPC · JPL |
| 835285 | 2011 FF_{45} | — | March 9, 2011 | Kitt Peak | Spacewatch | H | 460 m | MPC · JPL |
| 835286 | 2011 FT_{49} | — | February 10, 2011 | Mount Lemmon | Mount Lemmon Survey | · | 500 m | MPC · JPL |
| 835287 | 2011 FG_{54} | — | March 2, 2011 | Mount Lemmon | Mount Lemmon Survey | · | 2.2 km | MPC · JPL |
| 835288 | 2011 FN_{59} | — | March 30, 2011 | Mount Lemmon | Mount Lemmon Survey | · | 780 m | MPC · JPL |
| 835289 | 2011 FE_{60} | — | September 13, 2005 | Kitt Peak | Spacewatch | · | 530 m | MPC · JPL |
| 835290 | 2011 FY_{64} | — | January 29, 2010 | WISE | WISE | KON | 1.6 km | MPC · JPL |
| 835291 | 2011 FZ_{72} | — | March 27, 2011 | Mount Lemmon | Mount Lemmon Survey | PHO | 630 m | MPC · JPL |
| 835292 | 2011 FG_{75} | — | March 1, 2011 | Mount Lemmon | Mount Lemmon Survey | · | 490 m | MPC · JPL |
| 835293 | 2011 FE_{88} | — | March 14, 2011 | Mount Lemmon | Mount Lemmon Survey | · | 480 m | MPC · JPL |
| 835294 | 2011 FD_{93} | — | March 28, 2011 | Mount Lemmon | Mount Lemmon Survey | · | 640 m | MPC · JPL |
| 835295 | 2011 FA_{94} | — | March 28, 2011 | Mount Lemmon | Mount Lemmon Survey | BRA | 1.1 km | MPC · JPL |
| 835296 | 2011 FD_{95} | — | March 29, 2011 | Mount Lemmon | Mount Lemmon Survey | · | 1.1 km | MPC · JPL |
| 835297 | 2011 FJ_{96} | — | September 28, 2008 | Mount Lemmon | Mount Lemmon Survey | · | 2.7 km | MPC · JPL |
| 835298 | 2011 FT_{96} | — | March 29, 2011 | Mount Lemmon | Mount Lemmon Survey | · | 1.9 km | MPC · JPL |
| 835299 | 2011 FF_{101} | — | March 11, 2011 | Kitt Peak | Spacewatch | · | 1.3 km | MPC · JPL |
| 835300 | 2011 FQ_{102} | — | March 31, 2011 | Haleakala | Pan-STARRS 1 | · | 2.2 km | MPC · JPL |

== 835301–835400 ==
back to top

| Designation | | | Discovery | | | Properties | | Ref |
| Permanent | Provisional | Named after | Date | Site | Discoverer(s) | Category | Diam. | Ref |
|---|---|---|---|---|---|---|---|---|
| 835301 | 2011 FX_{109} | — | February 8, 2002 | Kitt Peak | Deep Ecliptic Survey | · | 1.1 km | MPC · JPL |
| 835302 | 2011 FO_{112} | — | April 1, 2011 | Mount Lemmon | Mount Lemmon Survey | · | 810 m | MPC · JPL |
| 835303 | 2011 FT_{113} | — | April 1, 2011 | Mount Lemmon | Mount Lemmon Survey | EOS | 1.3 km | MPC · JPL |
| 835304 | 2011 FF_{114} | — | April 1, 2011 | Mount Lemmon | Mount Lemmon Survey | · | 1.3 km | MPC · JPL |
| 835305 | 2011 FU_{117} | — | April 2, 2011 | Mount Lemmon | Mount Lemmon Survey | · | 660 m | MPC · JPL |
| 835306 | 2011 FV_{120} | — | March 14, 2011 | Mount Lemmon | Mount Lemmon Survey | EOS | 1.4 km | MPC · JPL |
| 835307 | 2011 FK_{125} | — | April 2, 2011 | Mount Lemmon | Mount Lemmon Survey | · | 1.1 km | MPC · JPL |
| 835308 | 2011 FO_{125} | — | March 11, 2011 | Kitt Peak | Spacewatch | · | 2.2 km | MPC · JPL |
| 835309 | 2011 FT_{127} | — | March 25, 2007 | Mount Lemmon | Mount Lemmon Survey | (1547) | 1.1 km | MPC · JPL |
| 835310 | 2011 FD_{136} | — | March 10, 2011 | Kitt Peak | Spacewatch | · | 640 m | MPC · JPL |
| 835311 | 2011 FY_{144} | — | February 4, 2010 | WISE | WISE | · | 2.5 km | MPC · JPL |
| 835312 | 2011 FC_{155} | — | March 6, 1994 | Stroncone | A. Vagnozzi | RAF | 1.0 km | MPC · JPL |
| 835313 | 2011 FV_{160} | — | January 21, 2015 | Haleakala | Pan-STARRS 1 | · | 1.1 km | MPC · JPL |
| 835314 | 2011 FQ_{162} | — | December 5, 2015 | Haleakala | Pan-STARRS 1 | LIX | 2.8 km | MPC · JPL |
| 835315 | 2011 FV_{162} | — | August 25, 2012 | Kitt Peak | Spacewatch | H | 390 m | MPC · JPL |
| 835316 | 2011 FD_{163} | — | March 25, 2011 | Kitt Peak | Spacewatch | · | 950 m | MPC · JPL |
| 835317 | 2011 FB_{164} | — | September 21, 2012 | Kitt Peak | Spacewatch | · | 610 m | MPC · JPL |
| 835318 | 2011 FF_{164} | — | November 30, 2014 | Haleakala | Pan-STARRS 1 | · | 1.5 km | MPC · JPL |
| 835319 | 2011 FQ_{164} | — | March 28, 2011 | Mount Lemmon | Mount Lemmon Survey | · | 550 m | MPC · JPL |
| 835320 | 2011 FH_{166} | — | July 19, 2015 | Haleakala | Pan-STARRS 2 | · | 540 m | MPC · JPL |
| 835321 | 2011 FV_{166} | — | February 17, 2015 | Haleakala | Pan-STARRS 1 | · | 1.1 km | MPC · JPL |
| 835322 | 2011 FF_{169} | — | March 29, 2011 | Mount Lemmon | Mount Lemmon Survey | THM | 1.7 km | MPC · JPL |
| 835323 | 2011 FU_{170} | — | March 27, 2011 | Mount Lemmon | Mount Lemmon Survey | critical | 1.1 km | MPC · JPL |
| 835324 | 2011 FS_{172} | — | March 31, 2011 | Haleakala | Pan-STARRS 1 | · | 1.7 km | MPC · JPL |
| 835325 | 2011 GK_{11} | — | March 14, 2010 | WISE | WISE | LIX | 3.0 km | MPC · JPL |
| 835326 | 2011 GM_{12} | — | April 1, 2011 | Mount Lemmon | Mount Lemmon Survey | · | 2.2 km | MPC · JPL |
| 835327 | 2011 GV_{12} | — | April 1, 2011 | Mount Lemmon | Mount Lemmon Survey | · | 2.3 km | MPC · JPL |
| 835328 | 2011 GL_{21} | — | April 2, 2011 | Mount Lemmon | Mount Lemmon Survey | · | 2.1 km | MPC · JPL |
| 835329 | 2011 GL_{23} | — | April 4, 2011 | Mount Lemmon | Mount Lemmon Survey | V | 410 m | MPC · JPL |
| 835330 | 2011 GR_{26} | — | April 4, 2011 | Mount Lemmon | Mount Lemmon Survey | · | 720 m | MPC · JPL |
| 835331 | 2011 GQ_{33} | — | August 7, 2008 | Kitt Peak | Spacewatch | NYS | 770 m | MPC · JPL |
| 835332 | 2011 GR_{35} | — | April 2, 2011 | Mount Lemmon | Mount Lemmon Survey | · | 2.2 km | MPC · JPL |
| 835333 | 2011 GZ_{50} | — | February 18, 2010 | WISE | WISE | · | 1.7 km | MPC · JPL |
| 835334 | 2011 GG_{54} | — | April 5, 2011 | Mount Lemmon | Mount Lemmon Survey | · | 1.5 km | MPC · JPL |
| 835335 | 2011 GF_{56} | — | October 29, 2002 | Sacramento Peak | SDSS | · | 2.6 km | MPC · JPL |
| 835336 | 2011 GG_{69} | — | October 22, 2003 | Palomar | NEAT | · | 1.7 km | MPC · JPL |
| 835337 | 2011 GU_{76} | — | February 21, 2001 | Sacramento Peak | SDSS | · | 2.2 km | MPC · JPL |
| 835338 | 2011 GY_{79} | — | October 5, 2002 | Sacramento Peak | SDSS | · | 1.9 km | MPC · JPL |
| 835339 | 2011 GE_{90} | — | April 3, 2011 | Haleakala | Pan-STARRS 1 | KON | 1.5 km | MPC · JPL |
| 835340 | 2011 GJ_{91} | — | July 13, 2013 | Haleakala | Pan-STARRS 1 | · | 1.0 km | MPC · JPL |
| 835341 | 2011 GB_{93} | — | October 6, 2013 | Catalina | CSS | EUN | 860 m | MPC · JPL |
| 835342 | 2011 GL_{94} | — | April 1, 2011 | Haleakala | Pan-STARRS 1 | THM | 1.7 km | MPC · JPL |
| 835343 | 2011 GC_{96} | — | May 21, 2015 | Haleakala | Pan-STARRS 1 | MAS | 560 m | MPC · JPL |
| 835344 | 2011 GA_{97} | — | November 24, 2014 | Haleakala | Pan-STARRS 1 | · | 2.5 km | MPC · JPL |
| 835345 | 2011 GP_{97} | — | March 17, 2010 | WISE | WISE | · | 1.7 km | MPC · JPL |
| 835346 | 2011 GN_{99} | — | March 18, 2016 | Mount Lemmon | Mount Lemmon Survey | EOS | 1.3 km | MPC · JPL |
| 835347 | 2011 GP_{99} | — | December 21, 2014 | Haleakala | Pan-STARRS 1 | · | 1.5 km | MPC · JPL |
| 835348 | 2011 GG_{102} | — | April 6, 2011 | Mount Lemmon | Mount Lemmon Survey | · | 1.2 km | MPC · JPL |
| 835349 | 2011 GQ_{102} | — | April 13, 2011 | Mount Lemmon | Mount Lemmon Survey | · | 1.1 km | MPC · JPL |
| 835350 | 2011 GG_{104} | — | April 5, 2011 | Mount Lemmon | Mount Lemmon Survey | · | 990 m | MPC · JPL |
| 835351 | 2011 GW_{105} | — | April 5, 2011 | Mount Lemmon | Mount Lemmon Survey | · | 860 m | MPC · JPL |
| 835352 | 2011 GE_{107} | — | April 3, 2011 | Haleakala | Pan-STARRS 1 | EOS | 1.3 km | MPC · JPL |
| 835353 | 2011 GR_{108} | — | April 3, 2011 | Haleakala | Pan-STARRS 1 | · | 2.0 km | MPC · JPL |
| 835354 | 2011 GF_{111} | — | April 6, 2011 | Mount Lemmon | Mount Lemmon Survey | · | 1.9 km | MPC · JPL |
| 835355 | 2011 HB_{8} | — | April 24, 2011 | Mount Lemmon | Mount Lemmon Survey | · | 680 m | MPC · JPL |
| 835356 | 2011 HV_{14} | — | April 1, 2010 | WISE | WISE | LIX | 3.8 km | MPC · JPL |
| 835357 | 2011 HZ_{14} | — | March 10, 2005 | Mount Lemmon | Mount Lemmon Survey | · | 1.9 km | MPC · JPL |
| 835358 | 2011 HP_{23} | — | April 28, 2011 | Mount Lemmon | Mount Lemmon Survey | · | 1.2 km | MPC · JPL |
| 835359 | 2011 HS_{26} | — | March 10, 2011 | Mount Lemmon | Mount Lemmon Survey | · | 2.7 km | MPC · JPL |
| 835360 | 2011 HL_{29} | — | October 5, 2002 | Sacramento Peak | SDSS | · | 680 m | MPC · JPL |
| 835361 | 2011 HX_{32} | — | April 11, 2011 | Mount Lemmon | Mount Lemmon Survey | · | 1.2 km | MPC · JPL |
| 835362 | 2011 HS_{35} | — | April 27, 2011 | Haleakala | Pan-STARRS 1 | · | 660 m | MPC · JPL |
| 835363 | 2011 HJ_{40} | — | April 4, 2010 | WISE | WISE | · | 1.3 km | MPC · JPL |
| 835364 | 2011 HX_{40} | — | February 9, 2010 | WISE | WISE | · | 3.2 km | MPC · JPL |
| 835365 | 2011 HG_{46} | — | April 6, 2011 | Mount Lemmon | Mount Lemmon Survey | · | 750 m | MPC · JPL |
| 835366 | 2011 HS_{47} | — | March 5, 2011 | Mount Lemmon | Mount Lemmon Survey | NYS | 860 m | MPC · JPL |
| 835367 | 2011 HM_{58} | — | September 25, 2003 | Mauna Kea | P. A. Wiegert | · | 1.3 km | MPC · JPL |
| 835368 | 2011 HE_{61} | — | April 16, 2010 | WISE | WISE | T_{j} (2.96) | 3.7 km | MPC · JPL |
| 835369 | 2011 HP_{72} | — | April 26, 2011 | Kitt Peak | Spacewatch | HNS | 1.2 km | MPC · JPL |
| 835370 | 2011 HR_{75} | — | March 1, 2011 | Mount Lemmon | Mount Lemmon Survey | NYS | 910 m | MPC · JPL |
| 835371 | 2011 HE_{79} | — | April 5, 2010 | WISE | WISE | · | 2.8 km | MPC · JPL |
| 835372 | 2011 HY_{82} | — | September 30, 2005 | Mount Lemmon | Mount Lemmon Survey | · | 1.1 km | MPC · JPL |
| 835373 | 2011 HC_{93} | — | March 22, 2010 | WISE | WISE | · | 1.8 km | MPC · JPL |
| 835374 | 2011 HK_{94} | — | April 13, 2011 | Mount Lemmon | Mount Lemmon Survey | · | 2.4 km | MPC · JPL |
| 835375 | 2011 HX_{94} | — | April 27, 2011 | Mount Lemmon | Mount Lemmon Survey | · | 2.0 km | MPC · JPL |
| 835376 | 2011 HW_{98} | — | April 30, 2011 | Kitt Peak | Spacewatch | · | 2.4 km | MPC · JPL |
| 835377 | 2011 HA_{100} | — | October 14, 2001 | Sacramento Peak | SDSS | · | 1.1 km | MPC · JPL |
| 835378 | 2011 HU_{105} | — | November 20, 2014 | Mount Lemmon | Mount Lemmon Survey | · | 3.0 km | MPC · JPL |
| 835379 | 2011 HG_{106} | — | December 25, 2013 | Mount Lemmon | Mount Lemmon Survey | EUN | 760 m | MPC · JPL |
| 835380 | 2011 HL_{106} | — | April 25, 2011 | Mount Lemmon | Mount Lemmon Survey | · | 2.7 km | MPC · JPL |
| 835381 | 2011 JB | — | March 14, 2007 | Catalina | CSS | PHO | 770 m | MPC · JPL |
| 835382 | 2011 JR_{1} | — | May 3, 2011 | Mount Lemmon | Mount Lemmon Survey | H | 410 m | MPC · JPL |
| 835383 | 2011 JC_{4} | — | April 7, 2010 | WISE | WISE | · | 3.2 km | MPC · JPL |
| 835384 | 2011 JT_{5} | — | March 20, 1999 | Sacramento Peak | SDSS | · | 3.0 km | MPC · JPL |
| 835385 | 2011 JA_{6} | — | April 25, 2007 | Mount Lemmon | Mount Lemmon Survey | EUN | 640 m | MPC · JPL |
| 835386 | 2011 JE_{7} | — | March 21, 2010 | WISE | WISE | · | 1.4 km | MPC · JPL |
| 835387 | 2011 JH_{10} | — | March 30, 2010 | WISE | WISE | T_{j} (2.99) | 2.5 km | MPC · JPL |
| 835388 | 2011 JN_{15} | — | March 20, 1999 | Sacramento Peak | SDSS | · | 2.6 km | MPC · JPL |
| 835389 | 2011 JF_{20} | — | May 3, 2011 | Mount Lemmon | Mount Lemmon Survey | · | 490 m | MPC · JPL |
| 835390 | 2011 JB_{22} | — | April 18, 2010 | WISE | WISE | · | 2.9 km | MPC · JPL |
| 835391 | 2011 JR_{30} | — | March 31, 2005 | Catalina | CSS | · | 2.2 km | MPC · JPL |
| 835392 | 2011 JD_{35} | — | May 8, 2011 | Kitt Peak | Spacewatch | · | 1.5 km | MPC · JPL |
| 835393 | 2011 JP_{35} | — | October 10, 2015 | Haleakala | Pan-STARRS 1 | · | 490 m | MPC · JPL |
| 835394 | 2011 JH_{36} | — | February 18, 2015 | Haleakala | Pan-STARRS 1 | · | 1.3 km | MPC · JPL |
| 835395 | 2011 JQ_{37} | — | May 8, 2011 | Mount Lemmon | Mount Lemmon Survey | · | 920 m | MPC · JPL |
| 835396 | 2011 JP_{38} | — | May 3, 2011 | Mount Lemmon | Mount Lemmon Survey | · | 1.2 km | MPC · JPL |
| 835397 | 2011 JL_{39} | — | May 8, 2011 | Kitt Peak | Spacewatch | TIR | 2.1 km | MPC · JPL |
| 835398 | 2011 KF_{2} | — | May 5, 2011 | Mount Lemmon | Mount Lemmon Survey | · | 510 m | MPC · JPL |
| 835399 | 2011 KL_{17} | — | May 28, 2011 | Nogales | M. Schwartz, P. R. Holvorcem | · | 870 m | MPC · JPL |
| 835400 | 2011 KS_{22} | — | October 10, 2008 | Mount Lemmon | Mount Lemmon Survey | PHO | 810 m | MPC · JPL |

== 835401–835500 ==
back to top

| Designation | | | Discovery | | | Properties | | Ref |
| Permanent | Provisional | Named after | Date | Site | Discoverer(s) | Category | Diam. | Ref |
|---|---|---|---|---|---|---|---|---|
| 835401 | 2011 KV_{23} | — | May 26, 2011 | Nogales | M. Schwartz, P. R. Holvorcem | · | 570 m | MPC · JPL |
| 835402 | 2011 KU_{25} | — | April 5, 2011 | Mount Lemmon | Mount Lemmon Survey | · | 900 m | MPC · JPL |
| 835403 | 2011 KY_{36} | — | April 11, 2010 | WISE | WISE | · | 2.4 km | MPC · JPL |
| 835404 | 2011 KA_{39} | — | June 4, 2010 | WISE | WISE | · | 3.3 km | MPC · JPL |
| 835405 | 2011 KR_{43} | — | May 26, 2011 | Mount Lemmon | Mount Lemmon Survey | · | 1.1 km | MPC · JPL |
| 835406 | 2011 KF_{44} | — | April 27, 2011 | Kitt Peak | Spacewatch | · | 1.2 km | MPC · JPL |
| 835407 | 2011 KH_{48} | — | March 9, 2010 | WISE | WISE | T_{j} (2.98) | 2.7 km | MPC · JPL |
| 835408 | 2011 KD_{51} | — | April 8, 2010 | WISE | WISE | · | 2.5 km | MPC · JPL |
| 835409 | 2011 KY_{52} | — | May 15, 2015 | Haleakala | Pan-STARRS 1 | · | 1.1 km | MPC · JPL |
| 835410 | 2011 KD_{53} | — | May 6, 2010 | WISE | WISE | TIR | 2.1 km | MPC · JPL |
| 835411 | 2011 KO_{55} | — | May 26, 2011 | Mount Lemmon | Mount Lemmon Survey | · | 1.0 km | MPC · JPL |
| 835412 | 2011 KC_{56} | — | May 29, 2011 | Mount Lemmon | Mount Lemmon Survey | · | 1.2 km | MPC · JPL |
| 835413 | 2011 KD_{56} | — | May 24, 2011 | Mount Lemmon | Mount Lemmon Survey | · | 1.3 km | MPC · JPL |
| 835414 | 2011 LT_{2} | — | June 2, 2011 | Haleakala | Pan-STARRS 1 | · | 1.4 km | MPC · JPL |
| 835415 | 2011 LL_{13} | — | June 1, 2011 | Nogales | M. Schwartz, P. R. Holvorcem | · | 900 m | MPC · JPL |
| 835416 | 2011 LQ_{13} | — | June 3, 2011 | Mount Lemmon | Mount Lemmon Survey | · | 1.3 km | MPC · JPL |
| 835417 | 2011 LK_{16} | — | May 17, 2010 | WISE | WISE | · | 3.0 km | MPC · JPL |
| 835418 | 2011 LD_{20} | — | December 21, 2006 | Palomar | NEAT | fast | 2.1 km | MPC · JPL |
| 835419 | 2011 LL_{20} | — | June 11, 2011 | Mount Lemmon | Mount Lemmon Survey | · | 1.9 km | MPC · JPL |
| 835420 | 2011 LN_{24} | — | June 6, 2011 | Haleakala | Pan-STARRS 1 | · | 510 m | MPC · JPL |
| 835421 | 2011 LQ_{26} | — | June 11, 2011 | Mount Lemmon | Mount Lemmon Survey | · | 1.3 km | MPC · JPL |
| 835422 | 2011 LP_{29} | — | June 7, 2011 | Mount Lemmon | Mount Lemmon Survey | · | 2.7 km | MPC · JPL |
| 835423 | 2011 LV_{29} | — | August 8, 2016 | Haleakala | Pan-STARRS 1 | · | 1.4 km | MPC · JPL |
| 835424 | 2011 LO_{31} | — | June 4, 2011 | Cerro Tololo | EURONEAR | · | 690 m | MPC · JPL |
| 835425 | 2011 LE_{32} | — | October 8, 2012 | Kitt Peak | Spacewatch | · | 1.1 km | MPC · JPL |
| 835426 | 2011 LU_{33} | — | April 4, 2010 | WISE | WISE | · | 2.5 km | MPC · JPL |
| 835427 | 2011 LZ_{33} | — | June 3, 2011 | Mount Lemmon | Mount Lemmon Survey | V | 580 m | MPC · JPL |
| 835428 | 2011 LA_{34} | — | June 4, 2011 | Mount Lemmon | Mount Lemmon Survey | · | 1.3 km | MPC · JPL |
| 835429 | 2011 LC_{35} | — | June 11, 2011 | Mount Lemmon | Mount Lemmon Survey | L5 | 8.4 km | MPC · JPL |
| 835430 | 2011 LG_{36} | — | June 7, 2011 | Haleakala | Pan-STARRS 1 | · | 2.8 km | MPC · JPL |
| 835431 | 2011 MR_{2} | — | June 17, 2010 | WISE | WISE | · | 2.9 km | MPC · JPL |
| 835432 | 2011 MS_{9} | — | June 28, 2011 | Mount Lemmon | Mount Lemmon Survey | H | 480 m | MPC · JPL |
| 835433 | 2011 MT_{12} | — | May 29, 2010 | WISE | WISE | T_{j} (2.97) | 2.8 km | MPC · JPL |
| 835434 | 2011 MH_{14} | — | September 22, 2016 | Haleakala | Pan-STARRS 1 | HNS | 810 m | MPC · JPL |
| 835435 | 2011 MO_{15} | — | June 28, 2011 | Mount Lemmon | Mount Lemmon Survey | · | 580 m | MPC · JPL |
| 835436 | 2011 MS_{15} | — | November 20, 2017 | Mount Lemmon | Mount Lemmon Survey | · | 2.0 km | MPC · JPL |
| 835437 | 2011 MX_{15} | — | June 25, 2011 | Kitt Peak | Spacewatch | · | 480 m | MPC · JPL |
| 835438 | 2011 MJ_{16} | — | June 23, 2011 | Mount Lemmon | Mount Lemmon Survey | · | 790 m | MPC · JPL |
| 835439 | 2011 ND_{2} | — | July 9, 2011 | Haleakala | Pan-STARRS 1 | · | 600 m | MPC · JPL |
| 835440 | 2011 NA_{5} | — | July 1, 2011 | Kitt Peak | Spacewatch | · | 2.2 km | MPC · JPL |
| 835441 | 2011 NK_{5} | — | July 2, 2011 | Kitt Peak | Spacewatch | · | 1.1 km | MPC · JPL |
| 835442 | 2011 NM_{5} | — | April 18, 2010 | WISE | WISE | · | 1.7 km | MPC · JPL |
| 835443 | 2011 NN_{5} | — | July 2, 2011 | Mount Lemmon | Mount Lemmon Survey | BAR | 850 m | MPC · JPL |
| 835444 | 2011 NS_{6} | — | July 1, 2011 | Mount Lemmon | Mount Lemmon Survey | · | 1.1 km | MPC · JPL |
| 835445 | 2011 OZ_{9} | — | July 26, 2011 | Haleakala | Pan-STARRS 1 | H | 320 m | MPC · JPL |
| 835446 | 2011 OA_{10} | — | July 26, 2011 | Haleakala | Pan-STARRS 1 | · | 220 m | MPC · JPL |
| 835447 | 2011 OE_{15} | — | May 16, 2010 | WISE | WISE | EUP | 2.6 km | MPC · JPL |
| 835448 | 2011 ON_{17} | — | April 11, 2002 | Palomar | NEAT | · | 1.4 km | MPC · JPL |
| 835449 | 2011 OS_{20} | — | May 5, 2000 | Sacramento Peak | SDSS | · | 1.7 km | MPC · JPL |
| 835450 | 2011 OD_{21} | — | July 25, 2011 | Haleakala | Pan-STARRS 1 | · | 1.0 km | MPC · JPL |
| 835451 | 2011 OM_{21} | — | July 25, 2011 | Haleakala | Pan-STARRS 1 | · | 1.7 km | MPC · JPL |
| 835452 | 2011 OV_{28} | — | July 28, 2011 | Haleakala | Pan-STARRS 1 | NYS | 840 m | MPC · JPL |
| 835453 | 2011 OD_{29} | — | November 11, 2001 | Sacramento Peak | SDSS | L5 | 7.8 km | MPC · JPL |
| 835454 | 2011 OK_{38} | — | July 27, 2011 | Haleakala | Pan-STARRS 1 | VER | 1.7 km | MPC · JPL |
| 835455 | 2011 OO_{43} | — | September 17, 2006 | Kitt Peak | Spacewatch | THM | 1.7 km | MPC · JPL |
| 835456 | 2011 OH_{45} | — | July 22, 2011 | Haleakala | Pan-STARRS 1 | · | 1.4 km | MPC · JPL |
| 835457 | 2011 OL_{45} | — | July 27, 2011 | Haleakala | Pan-STARRS 1 | · | 420 m | MPC · JPL |
| 835458 | 2011 OJ_{48} | — | February 16, 2010 | Catalina | CSS | · | 1.9 km | MPC · JPL |
| 835459 | 2011 OC_{52} | — | November 11, 2001 | Sacramento Peak | SDSS | · | 720 m | MPC · JPL |
| 835460 | 2011 OH_{55} | — | July 3, 2010 | WISE | WISE | · | 2.4 km | MPC · JPL |
| 835461 | 2011 OJ_{55} | — | July 26, 2011 | Haleakala | Pan-STARRS 1 | · | 1.9 km | MPC · JPL |
| 835462 | 2011 OG_{60} | — | December 8, 2015 | Haleakala | Pan-STARRS 1 | L5 | 6.0 km | MPC · JPL |
| 835463 | 2011 OD_{62} | — | July 25, 2011 | Haleakala | Pan-STARRS 1 | EOS | 1.2 km | MPC · JPL |
| 835464 | 2011 ON_{64} | — | July 27, 2011 | Haleakala | Pan-STARRS 1 | · | 1.5 km | MPC · JPL |
| 835465 | 2011 OX_{64} | — | July 28, 2011 | Haleakala | Pan-STARRS 1 | · | 1.3 km | MPC · JPL |
| 835466 | 2011 OX_{65} | — | January 28, 2014 | Kitt Peak | Spacewatch | · | 1.4 km | MPC · JPL |
| 835467 | 2011 OH_{67} | — | July 26, 2011 | Haleakala | Pan-STARRS 1 | · | 840 m | MPC · JPL |
| 835468 | 2011 OJ_{69} | — | October 14, 2015 | Catalina | CSS | · | 810 m | MPC · JPL |
| 835469 | 2011 OO_{70} | — | July 27, 2011 | Haleakala | Pan-STARRS 1 | · | 1.5 km | MPC · JPL |
| 835470 | 2011 OJ_{74} | — | July 25, 2011 | Haleakala | Pan-STARRS 1 | · | 1.7 km | MPC · JPL |
| 835471 | 2011 OA_{79} | — | July 27, 2011 | Haleakala | Pan-STARRS 1 | · | 890 m | MPC · JPL |
| 835472 | 2011 PG_{4} | — | August 3, 2011 | Haleakala | Pan-STARRS 1 | TIN | 730 m | MPC · JPL |
| 835473 | 2011 PW_{5} | — | July 26, 2001 | Palomar Mountain | NEAT | H | 480 m | MPC · JPL |
| 835474 | 2011 PX_{5} | — | October 1, 2008 | Mount Lemmon | Mount Lemmon Survey | · | 520 m | MPC · JPL |
| 835475 | 2011 PW_{6} | — | August 8, 2011 | Westfield | R. Holmes, T. Vorobjov | APO | 700 m | MPC · JPL |
| 835476 | 2011 PW_{7} | — | August 6, 2011 | Haleakala | Pan-STARRS 1 | · | 1.3 km | MPC · JPL |
| 835477 | 2011 PE_{11} | — | November 11, 2001 | Sacramento Peak | SDSS | · | 900 m | MPC · JPL |
| 835478 | 2011 PF_{11} | — | July 26, 2011 | Haleakala | Pan-STARRS 1 | · | 760 m | MPC · JPL |
| 835479 | 2011 PG_{12} | — | July 26, 2011 | Haleakala | Pan-STARRS 1 | EUP | 4.1 km | MPC · JPL |
| 835480 | 2011 PT_{15} | — | September 20, 2014 | Haleakala | Pan-STARRS 1 | L5 | 7.0 km | MPC · JPL |
| 835481 | 2011 PH_{16} | — | August 10, 2011 | Haleakala | Pan-STARRS 1 | · | 910 m | MPC · JPL |
| 835482 | 2011 PB_{17} | — | September 21, 2011 | Kitt Peak | Spacewatch | · | 2.4 km | MPC · JPL |
| 835483 | 2011 PK_{17} | — | February 11, 2014 | Mount Lemmon | Mount Lemmon Survey | · | 1.0 km | MPC · JPL |
| 835484 | 2011 PT_{17} | — | November 12, 2012 | Mount Lemmon | Mount Lemmon Survey | · | 2.3 km | MPC · JPL |
| 835485 | 2011 PR_{19} | — | December 14, 2015 | Mount Lemmon | Mount Lemmon Survey | · | 690 m | MPC · JPL |
| 835486 | 2011 PD_{21} | — | August 10, 2011 | Haleakala | Pan-STARRS 1 | AGN | 810 m | MPC · JPL |
| 835487 | 2011 PX_{22} | — | August 1, 2011 | Haleakala | Pan-STARRS 1 | · | 1.3 km | MPC · JPL |
| 835488 | 2011 QG_{4} | — | August 1, 2010 | WISE | WISE | (69559) | 2.5 km | MPC · JPL |
| 835489 | 2011 QT_{5} | — | July 1, 2010 | WISE | WISE | THB | 2.5 km | MPC · JPL |
| 835490 | 2011 QP_{11} | — | August 4, 2011 | Siding Spring | SSS | · | 1.7 km | MPC · JPL |
| 835491 | 2011 QD_{23} | — | June 12, 2011 | Haleakala | Pan-STARRS 1 | · | 1.1 km | MPC · JPL |
| 835492 | 2011 QH_{24} | — | August 20, 2011 | Haleakala | Pan-STARRS 1 | LIX | 2.4 km | MPC · JPL |
| 835493 | 2011 QO_{24} | — | August 20, 2011 | Haleakala | Pan-STARRS 1 | · | 2.0 km | MPC · JPL |
| 835494 | 2011 QW_{25} | — | October 14, 2001 | Sacramento Peak | SDSS | · | 1.6 km | MPC · JPL |
| 835495 | 2011 QE_{26} | — | April 14, 2007 | Mount Lemmon | Mount Lemmon Survey | · | 680 m | MPC · JPL |
| 835496 | 2011 QX_{35} | — | August 27, 2011 | Haleakala | Pan-STARRS 1 | MAS | 520 m | MPC · JPL |
| 835497 | 2011 QC_{40} | — | August 28, 2011 | Haleakala | Pan-STARRS 1 | · | 1 km | MPC · JPL |
| 835498 | 2011 QM_{42} | — | January 27, 2006 | Mount Lemmon | Mount Lemmon Survey | · | 1.0 km | MPC · JPL |
| 835499 | 2011 QB_{44} | — | February 24, 2010 | WISE | WISE | · | 2.9 km | MPC · JPL |
| 835500 | 2011 QK_{49} | — | August 27, 2011 | Andrushivka | Y. Ivaščenko, Kyrylenko, P. | · | 500 m | MPC · JPL |

== 835501–835600 ==
back to top

| Designation | | | Discovery | | | Properties | | Ref |
| Permanent | Provisional | Named after | Date | Site | Discoverer(s) | Category | Diam. | Ref |
|---|---|---|---|---|---|---|---|---|
| 835501 | 2011 QY_{54} | — | June 30, 2010 | WISE | WISE | DOR | 2.0 km | MPC · JPL |
| 835502 | 2011 QB_{59} | — | August 28, 2011 | Haleakala | Pan-STARRS 1 | · | 750 m | MPC · JPL |
| 835503 | 2011 QN_{59} | — | August 28, 2011 | Haleakala | Pan-STARRS 1 | · | 690 m | MPC · JPL |
| 835504 | 2011 QB_{60} | — | August 26, 2011 | Kitt Peak | Spacewatch | · | 730 m | MPC · JPL |
| 835505 | 2011 QJ_{60} | — | July 26, 2010 | WISE | WISE | · | 1.6 km | MPC · JPL |
| 835506 | 2011 QB_{67} | — | August 25, 2011 | La Sagra | OAM | · | 1.8 km | MPC · JPL |
| 835507 | 2011 QT_{67} | — | August 29, 2011 | Siding Spring | SSS | · | 940 m | MPC · JPL |
| 835508 | 2011 QH_{72} | — | August 29, 2011 | Siding Spring | SSS | · | 1.9 km | MPC · JPL |
| 835509 | 2011 QP_{76} | — | August 23, 2011 | Haleakala | Pan-STARRS 1 | MAS | 760 m | MPC · JPL |
| 835510 | 2011 QW_{76} | — | August 23, 2011 | Haleakala | Pan-STARRS 1 | · | 1.4 km | MPC · JPL |
| 835511 | 2011 QQ_{86} | — | June 26, 2010 | WISE | WISE | · | 2.5 km | MPC · JPL |
| 835512 | 2011 QK_{90} | — | July 25, 2010 | WISE | WISE | · | 1.7 km | MPC · JPL |
| 835513 | 2011 QE_{96} | — | September 28, 2002 | Haleakala | NEAT | · | 1.7 km | MPC · JPL |
| 835514 | 2011 QE_{100} | — | August 23, 2011 | Westfield | International Astronomical Search Collaboration | KOR | 860 m | MPC · JPL |
| 835515 | 2011 QP_{101} | — | August 31, 2011 | Haleakala | Pan-STARRS 1 | · | 2.3 km | MPC · JPL |
| 835516 | 2011 QS_{101} | — | February 28, 2014 | Haleakala | Pan-STARRS 1 | · | 790 m | MPC · JPL |
| 835517 | 2011 QP_{102} | — | August 30, 2011 | Haleakala | Pan-STARRS 1 | · | 900 m | MPC · JPL |
| 835518 | 2011 QE_{103} | — | November 7, 2012 | Mount Lemmon | Mount Lemmon Survey | · | 2.6 km | MPC · JPL |
| 835519 | 2011 QJ_{106} | — | September 11, 2015 | Haleakala | Pan-STARRS 1 | PHO | 510 m | MPC · JPL |
| 835520 | 2011 QN_{107} | — | August 24, 2011 | Haleakala | Pan-STARRS 1 | · | 1.1 km | MPC · JPL |
| 835521 | 2011 QK_{110} | — | August 28, 2011 | Siding Spring | SSS | T_{j} (2.92) | 3.3 km | MPC · JPL |
| 835522 | 2011 QZ_{112} | — | August 24, 2011 | Haleakala | Pan-STARRS 1 | TIR | 2.0 km | MPC · JPL |
| 835523 | 2011 QO_{113} | — | August 28, 2011 | Haleakala | Pan-STARRS 1 | ERI | 970 m | MPC · JPL |
| 835524 | 2011 QT_{114} | — | August 20, 2011 | Haleakala | Pan-STARRS 1 | · | 520 m | MPC · JPL |
| 835525 | 2011 QM_{117} | — | August 24, 2011 | Haleakala | Pan-STARRS 1 | · | 1.9 km | MPC · JPL |
| 835526 | 2011 RM | — | September 2, 2011 | Monte Baldo | F. Castellani, S. Moltomoli | H | 350 m | MPC · JPL |
| 835527 | 2011 RL_{8} | — | August 27, 2011 | Haleakala | Pan-STARRS 1 | · | 420 m | MPC · JPL |
| 835528 | 2011 RM_{8} | — | September 4, 2011 | Kitt Peak | Spacewatch | · | 1.9 km | MPC · JPL |
| 835529 | 2011 RO_{9} | — | September 2, 2011 | Haleakala | Pan-STARRS 1 | MRX | 680 m | MPC · JPL |
| 835530 | 2011 RK_{14} | — | December 18, 2001 | Sacramento Peak | SDSS | · | 730 m | MPC · JPL |
| 835531 | 2011 RO_{17} | — | September 2, 2011 | Haleakala | Pan-STARRS 1 | · | 980 m | MPC · JPL |
| 835532 | 2011 RL_{19} | — | February 13, 2010 | WISE | WISE | · | 2.4 km | MPC · JPL |
| 835533 | 2011 RS_{23} | — | September 4, 2011 | Haleakala | Pan-STARRS 1 | · | 1.4 km | MPC · JPL |
| 835534 | 2011 RT_{25} | — | September 4, 2011 | Haleakala | Pan-STARRS 1 | · | 760 m | MPC · JPL |
| 835535 | 2011 RO_{26} | — | September 4, 2011 | Haleakala | Pan-STARRS 1 | · | 1 km | MPC · JPL |
| 835536 | 2011 RW_{27} | — | September 7, 2011 | Kitt Peak | Spacewatch | · | 940 m | MPC · JPL |
| 835537 | 2011 RH_{28} | — | September 4, 2011 | Kitt Peak | Spacewatch | · | 1.3 km | MPC · JPL |
| 835538 | 2011 RO_{28} | — | September 2, 2011 | Haleakala | Pan-STARRS 1 | V | 430 m | MPC · JPL |
| 835539 | 2011 RJ_{29} | — | September 4, 2011 | Haleakala | Pan-STARRS 1 | GEF | 850 m | MPC · JPL |
| 835540 | 2011 RQ_{29} | — | September 8, 2011 | Haleakala | Pan-STARRS 1 | PAL | 1.1 km | MPC · JPL |
| 835541 | 2011 RE_{30} | — | September 2, 2011 | Haleakala | Pan-STARRS 1 | · | 1.4 km | MPC · JPL |
| 835542 | 2011 RL_{31} | — | September 4, 2011 | Haleakala | Pan-STARRS 1 | · | 490 m | MPC · JPL |
| 835543 | 2011 RD_{32} | — | September 2, 2011 | Haleakala | Pan-STARRS 1 | · | 1.1 km | MPC · JPL |
| 835544 | 2011 RE_{34} | — | September 4, 2011 | Haleakala | Pan-STARRS 1 | · | 2.0 km | MPC · JPL |
| 835545 | 2011 RP_{36} | — | September 4, 2011 | Haleakala | Pan-STARRS 1 | KOR | 1.0 km | MPC · JPL |
| 835546 | 2011 RR_{36} | — | September 4, 2011 | Haleakala | Pan-STARRS 1 | KOR | 940 m | MPC · JPL |
| 835547 | 2011 SV | — | September 2, 2011 | Haleakala | Pan-STARRS 1 | MAS | 460 m | MPC · JPL |
| 835548 | 2011 SR_{1} | — | November 4, 2002 | Kitt Peak | Spacewatch | · | 1.5 km | MPC · JPL |
| 835549 | 2011 SW_{3} | — | July 11, 2010 | WISE | WISE | DOR | 2.2 km | MPC · JPL |
| 835550 | 2011 SQ_{7} | — | September 18, 2011 | Mount Lemmon | Mount Lemmon Survey | · | 960 m | MPC · JPL |
| 835551 | 2011 SX_{11} | — | September 19, 2011 | Mount Lemmon | Mount Lemmon Survey | · | 1.4 km | MPC · JPL |
| 835552 | 2011 SK_{15} | — | September 19, 2011 | Mount Lemmon | Mount Lemmon Survey | · | 2.5 km | MPC · JPL |
| 835553 | 2011 SO_{15} | — | August 30, 2011 | Haleakala | Pan-STARRS 1 | DOR | 1.5 km | MPC · JPL |
| 835554 | 2011 SE_{17} | — | September 19, 2011 | Mount Lemmon | Mount Lemmon Survey | ADE | 1.3 km | MPC · JPL |
| 835555 | 2011 SO_{17} | — | September 19, 2011 | Mount Lemmon | Mount Lemmon Survey | · | 660 m | MPC · JPL |
| 835556 | 2011 SN_{18} | — | August 31, 2011 | Haleakala | Pan-STARRS 1 | · | 1.4 km | MPC · JPL |
| 835557 | 2011 SZ_{23} | — | September 20, 2011 | Haleakala | Pan-STARRS 1 | · | 2.2 km | MPC · JPL |
| 835558 | 2011 SH_{28} | — | September 19, 2011 | Haleakala | Pan-STARRS 1 | · | 1.1 km | MPC · JPL |
| 835559 | 2011 SB_{30} | — | September 20, 2011 | Mount Lemmon | Mount Lemmon Survey | · | 710 m | MPC · JPL |
| 835560 | 2011 SZ_{31} | — | July 28, 2005 | Palomar | NEAT | · | 2.2 km | MPC · JPL |
| 835561 | 2011 SA_{35} | — | September 20, 2011 | Kitt Peak | Spacewatch | · | 2.3 km | MPC · JPL |
| 835562 | 2011 SE_{36} | — | September 20, 2011 | Kitt Peak | Spacewatch | · | 460 m | MPC · JPL |
| 835563 | 2011 SM_{38} | — | September 18, 2011 | Mount Lemmon | Mount Lemmon Survey | AGN | 840 m | MPC · JPL |
| 835564 | 2011 SH_{41} | — | August 20, 2011 | Haleakala | Pan-STARRS 1 | · | 1.5 km | MPC · JPL |
| 835565 | 2011 SP_{43} | — | September 18, 2011 | Mount Lemmon | Mount Lemmon Survey | MRX | 670 m | MPC · JPL |
| 835566 | 2011 SU_{43} | — | September 18, 2011 | Mount Lemmon | Mount Lemmon Survey | · | 2.2 km | MPC · JPL |
| 835567 | 2011 SZ_{45} | — | September 19, 2011 | Mount Lemmon | Mount Lemmon Survey | · | 840 m | MPC · JPL |
| 835568 | 2011 SR_{48} | — | September 20, 2011 | Mount Lemmon | Mount Lemmon Survey | · | 400 m | MPC · JPL |
| 835569 | 2011 SA_{50} | — | September 19, 2011 | Mount Lemmon | Mount Lemmon Survey | · | 1.1 km | MPC · JPL |
| 835570 | 2011 SU_{50} | — | September 21, 2011 | Haleakala | Pan-STARRS 1 | KOR | 1.0 km | MPC · JPL |
| 835571 | 2011 SK_{51} | — | September 22, 2011 | Kitt Peak | Spacewatch | · | 670 m | MPC · JPL |
| 835572 | 2011 SC_{58} | — | September 18, 2011 | Haleakala | Armstrong, J. D. | EUN | 900 m | MPC · JPL |
| 835573 | 2011 SF_{58} | — | August 28, 2011 | Siding Spring | SSS | · | 3.3 km | MPC · JPL |
| 835574 | 2011 SU_{58} | — | February 14, 2005 | Kitt Peak | Spacewatch | · | 730 m | MPC · JPL |
| 835575 | 2011 SB_{62} | — | September 18, 2011 | Mount Lemmon | Mount Lemmon Survey | (5) | 780 m | MPC · JPL |
| 835576 | 2011 SM_{64} | — | September 13, 2004 | Kitt Peak | Spacewatch | · | 550 m | MPC · JPL |
| 835577 | 2011 SS_{64} | — | September 20, 2011 | Haleakala | Pan-STARRS 1 | · | 470 m | MPC · JPL |
| 835578 | 2011 SD_{65} | — | September 23, 2011 | Mayhill-ISON | L. Elenin | · | 1.1 km | MPC · JPL |
| 835579 | 2011 SM_{68} | — | September 24, 2011 | Catalina | CSS | APO · PHA | 420 m | MPC · JPL |
| 835580 | 2011 SQ_{70} | — | September 4, 2011 | Haleakala | Pan-STARRS 1 | · | 1.8 km | MPC · JPL |
| 835581 | 2011 SW_{70} | — | September 19, 2011 | Catalina | CSS | · | 410 m | MPC · JPL |
| 835582 | 2011 SR_{74} | — | October 15, 1995 | Kitt Peak | Spacewatch | · | 1.4 km | MPC · JPL |
| 835583 | 2011 SU_{74} | — | September 19, 2011 | Haleakala | Pan-STARRS 1 | · | 550 m | MPC · JPL |
| 835584 | 2011 SX_{76} | — | October 30, 2002 | Sacramento Peak | SDSS | · | 1.9 km | MPC · JPL |
| 835585 | 2011 SU_{83} | — | September 21, 2011 | Kitt Peak | Spacewatch | · | 650 m | MPC · JPL |
| 835586 | 2011 SO_{84} | — | September 27, 2002 | Palomar | NEAT | · | 1.5 km | MPC · JPL |
| 835587 | 2011 SV_{84} | — | September 21, 2011 | Kitt Peak | Spacewatch | · | 1.3 km | MPC · JPL |
| 835588 | 2011 SB_{87} | — | September 22, 2011 | Kitt Peak | Spacewatch | JUN | 650 m | MPC · JPL |
| 835589 | 2011 SB_{89} | — | September 22, 2011 | Kitt Peak | Spacewatch | · | 1.9 km | MPC · JPL |
| 835590 | 2011 SX_{94} | — | September 24, 2011 | Mount Lemmon | Mount Lemmon Survey | · | 1.2 km | MPC · JPL |
| 835591 | 2011 SM_{95} | — | September 4, 2011 | Haleakala | Pan-STARRS 1 | · | 930 m | MPC · JPL |
| 835592 | 2011 SA_{103} | — | September 8, 2004 | Palomar | NEAT | · | 630 m | MPC · JPL |
| 835593 | 2011 SH_{107} | — | September 24, 2011 | Mount Lemmon | Mount Lemmon Survey | NYS | 850 m | MPC · JPL |
| 835594 | 2011 SH_{109} | — | September 2, 2011 | Haleakala | Pan-STARRS 1 | · | 1.4 km | MPC · JPL |
| 835595 | 2011 SE_{116} | — | November 21, 2008 | Mount Lemmon | Mount Lemmon Survey | · | 530 m | MPC · JPL |
| 835596 | 2011 SL_{118} | — | September 4, 2011 | Haleakala | Pan-STARRS 1 | · | 1.2 km | MPC · JPL |
| 835597 | 2011 SM_{122} | — | September 21, 2011 | Kitt Peak | Spacewatch | · | 1.9 km | MPC · JPL |
| 835598 | 2011 SK_{129} | — | September 20, 2011 | Kitt Peak | Spacewatch | NYS | 720 m | MPC · JPL |
| 835599 | 2011 SG_{131} | — | September 20, 2011 | Kitt Peak | Spacewatch | NYS | 850 m | MPC · JPL |
| 835600 | 2011 SF_{141} | — | November 4, 2004 | Kitt Peak | Spacewatch | · | 680 m | MPC · JPL |

== 835601–835700 ==
back to top

| Designation | | | Discovery | | | Properties | | Ref |
| Permanent | Provisional | Named after | Date | Site | Discoverer(s) | Category | Diam. | Ref |
|---|---|---|---|---|---|---|---|---|
| 835601 | 2011 SN_{142} | — | September 23, 2011 | Haleakala | Pan-STARRS 1 | EOS | 1.3 km | MPC · JPL |
| 835602 | 2011 SG_{147} | — | March 20, 1999 | Sacramento Peak | SDSS | · | 2.0 km | MPC · JPL |
| 835603 | 2011 SF_{156} | — | March 20, 1999 | Sacramento Peak | SDSS | · | 1.9 km | MPC · JPL |
| 835604 | 2011 SA_{160} | — | September 23, 2011 | Kitt Peak | Spacewatch | · | 770 m | MPC · JPL |
| 835605 | 2011 SR_{160} | — | September 23, 2011 | Kitt Peak | Spacewatch | · | 920 m | MPC · JPL |
| 835606 | 2011 SG_{163} | — | November 7, 2007 | Kitt Peak | Spacewatch | · | 1.2 km | MPC · JPL |
| 835607 | 2011 SG_{165} | — | September 23, 2011 | Haleakala | Pan-STARRS 1 | · | 2.2 km | MPC · JPL |
| 835608 | 2011 SU_{165} | — | October 3, 2002 | Palomar | NEAT | · | 1.7 km | MPC · JPL |
| 835609 | 2011 SL_{167} | — | November 21, 2008 | Mount Lemmon | Mount Lemmon Survey | · | 750 m | MPC · JPL |
| 835610 | 2011 SU_{167} | — | September 28, 2011 | Mount Lemmon | Mount Lemmon Survey | H | 350 m | MPC · JPL |
| 835611 | 2011 SB_{172} | — | September 28, 2011 | Mount Lemmon | Mount Lemmon Survey | · | 540 m | MPC · JPL |
| 835612 | 2011 SS_{172} | — | April 8, 2010 | WISE | WISE | · | 3.0 km | MPC · JPL |
| 835613 | 2011 SJ_{174} | — | October 10, 2002 | Sacramento Peak | SDSS | · | 1.4 km | MPC · JPL |
| 835614 | 2011 SM_{174} | — | August 10, 1994 | La Silla | E. W. Elst | · | 1.8 km | MPC · JPL |
| 835615 | 2011 SY_{175} | — | September 26, 2011 | Haleakala | Pan-STARRS 1 | KOR | 1.0 km | MPC · JPL |
| 835616 | 2011 SN_{181} | — | September 26, 2011 | Kitt Peak | Spacewatch | · | 1.3 km | MPC · JPL |
| 835617 | 2011 SF_{182} | — | September 26, 2011 | Kitt Peak | Spacewatch | AEO | 740 m | MPC · JPL |
| 835618 | 2011 SD_{191} | — | October 25, 2007 | Mount Lemmon | Mount Lemmon Survey | · | 1.8 km | MPC · JPL |
| 835619 | 2011 SD_{198} | — | September 18, 2011 | Mount Lemmon | Mount Lemmon Survey | MAS | 530 m | MPC · JPL |
| 835620 | 2011 SC_{210} | — | September 2, 2011 | Haleakala | Pan-STARRS 1 | · | 1.9 km | MPC · JPL |
| 835621 | 2011 SY_{211} | — | September 19, 1996 | Kitt Peak | Spacewatch | CLA | 1.2 km | MPC · JPL |
| 835622 | 2011 SO_{213} | — | July 27, 2010 | WISE | WISE | · | 3.8 km | MPC · JPL |
| 835623 | 2011 SB_{214} | — | September 21, 2011 | Haleakala | Pan-STARRS 1 | · | 1.8 km | MPC · JPL |
| 835624 | 2011 SW_{215} | — | September 23, 2011 | Kitt Peak | Spacewatch | T_{j} (2.95) | 3.1 km | MPC · JPL |
| 835625 | 2011 SM_{216} | — | September 23, 2011 | Kitt Peak | Spacewatch | · | 690 m | MPC · JPL |
| 835626 | 2011 SA_{221} | — | September 26, 2011 | Haleakala | Pan-STARRS 1 | BRA | 1.1 km | MPC · JPL |
| 835627 | 2011 SK_{221} | — | September 26, 2011 | Haleakala | Pan-STARRS 1 | · | 550 m | MPC · JPL |
| 835628 | 2011 SK_{227} | — | September 29, 2011 | Mount Lemmon | Mount Lemmon Survey | · | 1.3 km | MPC · JPL |
| 835629 | 2011 SL_{227} | — | September 29, 2011 | Mount Lemmon | Mount Lemmon Survey | · | 2.3 km | MPC · JPL |
| 835630 | 2011 SX_{227} | — | September 29, 2011 | Mount Lemmon | Mount Lemmon Survey | · | 510 m | MPC · JPL |
| 835631 | 2011 SQ_{235} | — | September 26, 2011 | Bergisch Gladbach | W. Bickel | · | 620 m | MPC · JPL |
| 835632 | 2011 SC_{236} | — | September 30, 2011 | Haleakala | Pan-STARRS 1 | · | 680 m | MPC · JPL |
| 835633 | 2011 SC_{237} | — | April 10, 2010 | Rodeo | T. Vorobjov | · | 1 km | MPC · JPL |
| 835634 | 2011 SQ_{238} | — | March 21, 1999 | Sacramento Peak | SDSS | · | 840 m | MPC · JPL |
| 835635 | 2011 SQ_{245} | — | September 28, 2011 | ESA OGS | ESA OGS | · | 710 m | MPC · JPL |
| 835636 | 2011 SK_{247} | — | September 30, 2011 | Kitt Peak | Spacewatch | · | 1.2 km | MPC · JPL |
| 835637 | 2011 ST_{249} | — | September 23, 2011 | Catalina | CSS | · | 1.6 km | MPC · JPL |
| 835638 | 2011 SP_{257} | — | September 23, 2011 | Haleakala | Pan-STARRS 1 | · | 1.3 km | MPC · JPL |
| 835639 | 2011 SU_{257} | — | September 28, 2011 | Kitt Peak | Spacewatch | · | 670 m | MPC · JPL |
| 835640 | 2011 SP_{261} | — | January 1, 2009 | Mount Lemmon | Mount Lemmon Survey | NYS | 660 m | MPC · JPL |
| 835641 | 2011 SZ_{261} | — | October 30, 2002 | Sacramento Peak | SDSS | · | 1.3 km | MPC · JPL |
| 835642 | 2011 SP_{276} | — | September 23, 2011 | Kitt Peak | Spacewatch | · | 750 m | MPC · JPL |
| 835643 | 2011 SX_{277} | — | September 24, 2011 | Haleakala | Pan-STARRS 1 | H | 430 m | MPC · JPL |
| 835644 | 2011 SX_{284} | — | March 28, 2014 | Mount Lemmon | Mount Lemmon Survey | · | 1.4 km | MPC · JPL |
| 835645 | 2011 SL_{285} | — | September 23, 2011 | Kitt Peak | Spacewatch | · | 1.9 km | MPC · JPL |
| 835646 | 2011 ST_{286} | — | September 19, 2011 | Mount Lemmon | Mount Lemmon Survey | · | 780 m | MPC · JPL |
| 835647 | 2011 SG_{288} | — | September 29, 2011 | Kitt Peak | Spacewatch | · | 1.3 km | MPC · JPL |
| 835648 | 2011 SE_{289} | — | August 2, 2016 | Haleakala | Pan-STARRS 1 | · | 1.4 km | MPC · JPL |
| 835649 | 2011 SL_{289} | — | February 22, 2010 | WISE | WISE | LIX | 2.9 km | MPC · JPL |
| 835650 | 2011 SV_{289} | — | September 30, 2011 | Kitt Peak | Spacewatch | TIR | 2.0 km | MPC · JPL |
| 835651 | 2011 SF_{291} | — | September 21, 2011 | Mount Lemmon | Mount Lemmon Survey | · | 1.2 km | MPC · JPL |
| 835652 | 2011 SE_{293} | — | September 25, 2011 | Haleakala | Pan-STARRS 1 | · | 1.5 km | MPC · JPL |
| 835653 | 2011 SV_{294} | — | June 17, 2010 | WISE | WISE | · | 1.2 km | MPC · JPL |
| 835654 | 2011 SU_{295} | — | September 25, 2011 | Haleakala | Pan-STARRS 1 | KON | 1.6 km | MPC · JPL |
| 835655 | 2011 SO_{296} | — | September 26, 2011 | ESA OGS | ESA OGS | T_{j} (2.97) · 3:2 | 3.7 km | MPC · JPL |
| 835656 | 2011 SK_{298} | — | May 6, 2014 | Haleakala | Pan-STARRS 1 | V | 390 m | MPC · JPL |
| 835657 | 2011 SX_{301} | — | May 9, 2010 | WISE | WISE | · | 1.0 km | MPC · JPL |
| 835658 | 2011 SP_{303} | — | May 21, 2014 | Haleakala | Pan-STARRS 1 | NYS | 670 m | MPC · JPL |
| 835659 | 2011 SH_{304} | — | September 18, 2011 | Mount Lemmon | Mount Lemmon Survey | KOR | 1.0 km | MPC · JPL |
| 835660 | 2011 SO_{304} | — | September 12, 2015 | Haleakala | Pan-STARRS 1 | · | 760 m | MPC · JPL |
| 835661 | 2011 SV_{305} | — | February 28, 2014 | Haleakala | Pan-STARRS 1 | PHO | 650 m | MPC · JPL |
| 835662 | 2011 SZ_{305} | — | September 23, 2011 | Kitt Peak | Spacewatch | V | 480 m | MPC · JPL |
| 835663 | 2011 SC_{306} | — | February 28, 2014 | Haleakala | Pan-STARRS 1 | · | 1.5 km | MPC · JPL |
| 835664 | 2011 SG_{306} | — | September 29, 2011 | Mount Lemmon | Mount Lemmon Survey | · | 550 m | MPC · JPL |
| 835665 | 2011 SP_{306} | — | September 26, 2011 | Haleakala | Pan-STARRS 1 | VER | 1.8 km | MPC · JPL |
| 835666 | 2011 SW_{306} | — | September 26, 2011 | Mount Lemmon | Mount Lemmon Survey | · | 870 m | MPC · JPL |
| 835667 | 2011 SZ_{306} | — | September 29, 2011 | Kitt Peak | Spacewatch | · | 380 m | MPC · JPL |
| 835668 | 2011 SD_{309} | — | September 18, 2011 | Mount Lemmon | Mount Lemmon Survey | · | 710 m | MPC · JPL |
| 835669 | 2011 SH_{313} | — | September 21, 2011 | Kitt Peak | Spacewatch | · | 1.4 km | MPC · JPL |
| 835670 | 2011 SF_{314} | — | September 23, 2011 | Haleakala | Pan-STARRS 1 | · | 730 m | MPC · JPL |
| 835671 | 2011 SG_{315} | — | September 18, 2011 | Mount Lemmon | Mount Lemmon Survey | · | 1.1 km | MPC · JPL |
| 835672 | 2011 SG_{321} | — | September 23, 2011 | Kitt Peak | Spacewatch | · | 1.4 km | MPC · JPL |
| 835673 | 2011 SG_{323} | — | September 28, 2011 | Mount Lemmon | Mount Lemmon Survey | · | 1.3 km | MPC · JPL |
| 835674 | 2011 SC_{325} | — | September 27, 2011 | Mount Lemmon | Mount Lemmon Survey | · | 1.0 km | MPC · JPL |
| 835675 | 2011 SU_{325} | — | September 25, 2011 | Haleakala | Pan-STARRS 1 | · | 1.2 km | MPC · JPL |
| 835676 | 2011 SS_{326} | — | September 30, 2011 | Kitt Peak | Spacewatch | · | 1.2 km | MPC · JPL |
| 835677 | 2011 SV_{327} | — | September 28, 2011 | Kitt Peak | Spacewatch | · | 1.8 km | MPC · JPL |
| 835678 | 2011 SK_{328} | — | September 23, 2011 | Kitt Peak | Spacewatch | · | 900 m | MPC · JPL |
| 835679 | 2011 SZ_{329} | — | September 28, 2011 | Mount Lemmon | Mount Lemmon Survey | · | 2.2 km | MPC · JPL |
| 835680 | 2011 SF_{330} | — | September 26, 2011 | Haleakala | Pan-STARRS 1 | · | 1.2 km | MPC · JPL |
| 835681 | 2011 SC_{338} | — | September 23, 2011 | Kitt Peak | Spacewatch | · | 560 m | MPC · JPL |
| 835682 | 2011 SU_{340} | — | September 26, 2011 | Haleakala | Pan-STARRS 1 | · | 1.7 km | MPC · JPL |
| 835683 | 2011 SN_{341} | — | September 19, 2011 | Haleakala | Pan-STARRS 1 | · | 1.3 km | MPC · JPL |
| 835684 | 2011 SO_{341} | — | September 26, 2011 | Haleakala | Pan-STARRS 1 | · | 1.4 km | MPC · JPL |
| 835685 | 2011 SU_{346} | — | September 18, 2011 | Mount Lemmon | Mount Lemmon Survey | · | 770 m | MPC · JPL |
| 835686 | 2011 SH_{347} | — | September 28, 2011 | Mount Lemmon | Mount Lemmon Survey | EUN | 810 m | MPC · JPL |
| 835687 | 2011 ST_{354} | — | September 23, 2011 | Haleakala | Pan-STARRS 1 | · | 1.8 km | MPC · JPL |
| 835688 | 2011 SU_{356} | — | September 24, 2011 | Haleakala | Pan-STARRS 1 | EOS | 1.2 km | MPC · JPL |
| 835689 | 2011 SU_{360} | — | September 23, 2011 | Mount Lemmon | Mount Lemmon Survey | KOR | 860 m | MPC · JPL |
| 835690 | 2011 TW | — | October 1, 2011 | Kitt Peak | Spacewatch | · | 1.2 km | MPC · JPL |
| 835691 | 2011 TU_{3} | — | September 14, 2007 | Mount Lemmon | Mount Lemmon Survey | · | 1.1 km | MPC · JPL |
| 835692 | 2011 TL_{4} | — | February 19, 2010 | WISE | WISE | · | 1.5 km | MPC · JPL |
| 835693 | 2011 TN_{14} | — | June 25, 2010 | WISE | WISE | · | 1.8 km | MPC · JPL |
| 835694 | 2011 TC_{17} | — | September 16, 1993 | Saanich | D. D. Balam | · | 820 m | MPC · JPL |
| 835695 | 2011 TO_{19} | — | July 25, 2015 | Haleakala | Pan-STARRS 1 | · | 830 m | MPC · JPL |
| 835696 | 2011 TF_{20} | — | February 22, 2017 | Haleakala | Pan-STARRS 1 | · | 910 m | MPC · JPL |
| 835697 | 2011 TU_{20} | — | October 1, 2011 | Kitt Peak | Spacewatch | DOR | 1.8 km | MPC · JPL |
| 835698 | 2011 TD_{21} | — | October 1, 2011 | Kitt Peak | Spacewatch | PAD | 1.2 km | MPC · JPL |
| 835699 | 2011 TF_{21} | — | October 2, 2011 | Bergisch Gladbach | W. Bickel | · | 1.5 km | MPC · JPL |
| 835700 | 2011 TL_{23} | — | October 3, 2011 | Mount Lemmon | Mount Lemmon Survey | KOR | 980 m | MPC · JPL |

== 835701–835800 ==
back to top

| Designation | | | Discovery | | | Properties | | Ref |
| Permanent | Provisional | Named after | Date | Site | Discoverer(s) | Category | Diam. | Ref |
|---|---|---|---|---|---|---|---|---|
| 835701 | 2011 UP_{1} | — | October 16, 2011 | Kitt Peak | Spacewatch | · | 740 m | MPC · JPL |
| 835702 | 2011 UG_{18} | — | October 10, 2002 | Sacramento Peak | SDSS | · | 1.4 km | MPC · JPL |
| 835703 | 2011 US_{19} | — | September 20, 2011 | Catalina | CSS | · | 690 m | MPC · JPL |
| 835704 | 2011 UV_{21} | — | October 16, 2011 | Kitt Peak | Spacewatch | · | 1.1 km | MPC · JPL |
| 835705 | 2011 UE_{26} | — | December 10, 2004 | Kitt Peak | Spacewatch | · | 770 m | MPC · JPL |
| 835706 | 2011 UK_{31} | — | October 18, 2011 | Haleakala | Pan-STARRS 1 | (18466) | 1.6 km | MPC · JPL |
| 835707 | 2011 UT_{38} | — | October 20, 2011 | Mount Lemmon | Mount Lemmon Survey | EOS | 1.5 km | MPC · JPL |
| 835708 | 2011 UM_{42} | — | October 19, 2001 | Kitt Peak | Spacewatch | · | 520 m | MPC · JPL |
| 835709 | 2011 UQ_{46} | — | October 18, 2011 | Kitt Peak | Spacewatch | · | 660 m | MPC · JPL |
| 835710 | 2011 UD_{50} | — | October 18, 2011 | Kitt Peak | Spacewatch | THM | 1.7 km | MPC · JPL |
| 835711 | 2011 US_{51} | — | October 18, 2006 | Kitt Peak | Spacewatch | · | 1.7 km | MPC · JPL |
| 835712 | 2011 UR_{52} | — | January 17, 2004 | Palomar | NEAT | · | 1.2 km | MPC · JPL |
| 835713 | 2011 UB_{54} | — | October 25, 1995 | Kleť | Kleť, Observatoř | · | 2.3 km | MPC · JPL |
| 835714 | 2011 UY_{54} | — | September 24, 2011 | Mount Lemmon | Mount Lemmon Survey | · | 1.3 km | MPC · JPL |
| 835715 | 2011 UT_{55} | — | September 24, 2011 | Mount Lemmon | Mount Lemmon Survey | · | 840 m | MPC · JPL |
| 835716 | 2011 UA_{60} | — | October 21, 2011 | Mount Lemmon | Mount Lemmon Survey | · | 2.1 km | MPC · JPL |
| 835717 | 2011 US_{66} | — | November 4, 2004 | Kitt Peak | Spacewatch | · | 710 m | MPC · JPL |
| 835718 | 2011 UG_{69} | — | September 29, 2011 | Mount Lemmon | Mount Lemmon Survey | V | 580 m | MPC · JPL |
| 835719 | 2011 UG_{70} | — | September 12, 2007 | Mount Lemmon | Mount Lemmon Survey | · | 1.0 km | MPC · JPL |
| 835720 | 2011 UG_{75} | — | September 20, 2011 | Kitt Peak | Spacewatch | · | 580 m | MPC · JPL |
| 835721 | 2011 UA_{76} | — | October 19, 2011 | Kitt Peak | Spacewatch | · | 1.5 km | MPC · JPL |
| 835722 | 2011 UE_{80} | — | October 14, 2001 | Sacramento Peak | SDSS | · | 500 m | MPC · JPL |
| 835723 | 2011 UU_{80} | — | October 19, 2011 | Kitt Peak | Spacewatch | · | 980 m | MPC · JPL |
| 835724 | 2011 UX_{87} | — | October 21, 2011 | Mount Lemmon | Mount Lemmon Survey | · | 1.8 km | MPC · JPL |
| 835725 | 2011 UC_{88} | — | October 21, 2011 | Mount Lemmon | Mount Lemmon Survey | · | 1.6 km | MPC · JPL |
| 835726 | 2011 UD_{98} | — | September 23, 2011 | Kitt Peak | Spacewatch | · | 1.6 km | MPC · JPL |
| 835727 | 2011 UQ_{98} | — | October 20, 2011 | Kitt Peak | Spacewatch | · | 2.4 km | MPC · JPL |
| 835728 | 2011 UF_{99} | — | May 7, 2010 | Kitt Peak | Spacewatch | PHO | 910 m | MPC · JPL |
| 835729 | 2011 UH_{105} | — | November 24, 2002 | Palomar | NEAT | · | 1.1 km | MPC · JPL |
| 835730 | 2011 US_{105} | — | April 11, 2010 | WISE | WISE | · | 2.8 km | MPC · JPL |
| 835731 | 2011 UR_{107} | — | October 21, 2011 | Haleakala | Pan-STARRS 1 | · | 720 m | MPC · JPL |
| 835732 | 2011 UW_{110} | — | September 29, 2011 | Mount Lemmon | Mount Lemmon Survey | · | 1.9 km | MPC · JPL |
| 835733 | 2011 UB_{118} | — | November 27, 2000 | Socorro | LINEAR | EUP | 3.6 km | MPC · JPL |
| 835734 | 2011 UD_{120} | — | August 27, 2005 | Palomar | NEAT | · | 1.9 km | MPC · JPL |
| 835735 | 2011 UO_{122} | — | September 18, 2006 | Kitt Peak | Spacewatch | · | 1.3 km | MPC · JPL |
| 835736 | 2011 UK_{126} | — | October 20, 2011 | Kitt Peak | Spacewatch | · | 880 m | MPC · JPL |
| 835737 | 2011 UD_{133} | — | October 23, 2011 | Kitt Peak | Spacewatch | · | 1.9 km | MPC · JPL |
| 835738 | 2011 UK_{134} | — | September 27, 2011 | Mount Lemmon | Mount Lemmon Survey | · | 1.4 km | MPC · JPL |
| 835739 | 2011 UJ_{146} | — | May 14, 2010 | WISE | WISE | · | 2.7 km | MPC · JPL |
| 835740 | 2011 UW_{151} | — | October 24, 2011 | Haleakala | Pan-STARRS 1 | H | 510 m | MPC · JPL |
| 835741 | 2011 UM_{159} | — | July 17, 2004 | Cerro Tololo | Deep Ecliptic Survey | · | 500 m | MPC · JPL |
| 835742 | 2011 UX_{163} | — | October 25, 2011 | Haleakala | Pan-STARRS 1 | · | 1.0 km | MPC · JPL |
| 835743 | 2011 UM_{171} | — | September 29, 2011 | Piszkéstető | K. Sárneczky | · | 680 m | MPC · JPL |
| 835744 | 2011 UR_{172} | — | October 21, 2011 | Piszkéstető | K. Sárneczky | · | 670 m | MPC · JPL |
| 835745 | 2011 UR_{176} | — | September 23, 2011 | Mount Lemmon | Mount Lemmon Survey | · | 570 m | MPC · JPL |
| 835746 | 2011 UM_{182} | — | October 25, 2011 | Haleakala | Pan-STARRS 1 | · | 1.9 km | MPC · JPL |
| 835747 | 2011 UD_{195} | — | April 8, 2010 | WISE | WISE | · | 3.4 km | MPC · JPL |
| 835748 | 2011 UD_{207} | — | November 23, 2006 | Mount Lemmon | Mount Lemmon Survey | EOS | 1.3 km | MPC · JPL |
| 835749 | 2011 UQ_{208} | — | September 30, 2006 | Mount Lemmon | Mount Lemmon Survey | H | 290 m | MPC · JPL |
| 835750 | 2011 UV_{208} | — | March 18, 2010 | Kitt Peak | Spacewatch | · | 1.3 km | MPC · JPL |
| 835751 | 2011 UV_{210} | — | November 13, 2007 | Kitt Peak | Spacewatch | · | 1.2 km | MPC · JPL |
| 835752 | 2011 UB_{214} | — | October 24, 2011 | Mount Lemmon | Mount Lemmon Survey | · | 1.4 km | MPC · JPL |
| 835753 | 2011 UT_{217} | — | April 9, 2003 | Kitt Peak | Spacewatch | · | 660 m | MPC · JPL |
| 835754 | 2011 UP_{221} | — | September 28, 2011 | Kitt Peak | Spacewatch | · | 1.9 km | MPC · JPL |
| 835755 | 2011 US_{221} | — | October 19, 2011 | Mount Lemmon | Mount Lemmon Survey | · | 1.3 km | MPC · JPL |
| 835756 | 2011 UO_{222} | — | November 4, 2007 | Kitt Peak | Spacewatch | · | 990 m | MPC · JPL |
| 835757 | 2011 US_{222} | — | September 29, 2011 | Kitt Peak | Spacewatch | · | 1.2 km | MPC · JPL |
| 835758 | 2011 UT_{222} | — | September 29, 2011 | Kitt Peak | Spacewatch | · | 1.6 km | MPC · JPL |
| 835759 | 2011 UG_{224} | — | January 30, 2009 | Bergisch Gladbach | W. Bickel | PHO | 630 m | MPC · JPL |
| 835760 | 2011 UO_{229} | — | September 21, 2011 | Kitt Peak | Spacewatch | · | 1.5 km | MPC · JPL |
| 835761 | 2011 UJ_{230} | — | October 24, 2011 | Mount Lemmon | Mount Lemmon Survey | · | 740 m | MPC · JPL |
| 835762 | 2011 UZ_{240} | — | September 26, 2000 | Kitt Peak | Spacewatch | · | 810 m | MPC · JPL |
| 835763 | 2011 UW_{242} | — | October 25, 2011 | Haleakala | Pan-STARRS 1 | THM | 1.7 km | MPC · JPL |
| 835764 | 2011 UN_{244} | — | November 11, 2004 | Kitt Peak | Spacewatch | V | 520 m | MPC · JPL |
| 835765 | 2011 UF_{251} | — | October 26, 2011 | Haleakala | Pan-STARRS 1 | · | 990 m | MPC · JPL |
| 835766 | 2011 UN_{251} | — | October 26, 2011 | Haleakala | Pan-STARRS 1 | · | 880 m | MPC · JPL |
| 835767 | 2011 UH_{254} | — | September 10, 2007 | Mount Lemmon | Mount Lemmon Survey | NYS | 870 m | MPC · JPL |
| 835768 | 2011 UD_{257} | — | February 20, 2009 | Mount Lemmon | Mount Lemmon Survey | · | 580 m | MPC · JPL |
| 835769 | 2011 UZ_{259} | — | October 21, 2011 | Kitt Peak | Spacewatch | (194) | 1.4 km | MPC · JPL |
| 835770 | 2011 UZ_{260} | — | October 23, 2011 | Kitt Peak | Spacewatch | · | 1.0 km | MPC · JPL |
| 835771 | 2011 UD_{266} | — | October 26, 2011 | Haleakala | Pan-STARRS 1 | · | 410 m | MPC · JPL |
| 835772 | 2011 UU_{267} | — | November 8, 2007 | Kitt Peak | Spacewatch | · | 850 m | MPC · JPL |
| 835773 | 2011 UD_{269} | — | September 29, 2011 | Kitt Peak | Spacewatch | · | 700 m | MPC · JPL |
| 835774 | 2011 UJ_{271} | — | September 27, 2011 | Kitt Peak | Spacewatch | · | 770 m | MPC · JPL |
| 835775 | 2011 UL_{272} | — | August 30, 2011 | Les Engarouines | L. Bernasconi | EMA | 2.1 km | MPC · JPL |
| 835776 | 2011 UW_{273} | — | December 21, 2008 | Mount Lemmon | Mount Lemmon Survey | · | 810 m | MPC · JPL |
| 835777 | 2011 UT_{275} | — | October 24, 2011 | Haleakala | Pan-STARRS 1 | · | 1.6 km | MPC · JPL |
| 835778 | 2011 UV_{275} | — | October 6, 2004 | Kitt Peak | Spacewatch | · | 560 m | MPC · JPL |
| 835779 | 2011 UR_{281} | — | October 20, 2011 | Kitt Peak | Spacewatch | · | 460 m | MPC · JPL |
| 835780 | 2011 UU_{282} | — | October 20, 2011 | Mount Lemmon | Mount Lemmon Survey | · | 630 m | MPC · JPL |
| 835781 | 2011 UP_{283} | — | March 20, 1999 | Sacramento Peak | SDSS | · | 1.1 km | MPC · JPL |
| 835782 | 2011 UL_{285} | — | September 30, 2011 | Mount Lemmon | Mount Lemmon Survey | · | 2.7 km | MPC · JPL |
| 835783 | 2011 UO_{288} | — | September 18, 2006 | Kitt Peak | Spacewatch | · | 1.5 km | MPC · JPL |
| 835784 | 2011 UJ_{291} | — | May 16, 2010 | Mount Lemmon | Mount Lemmon Survey | · | 1.5 km | MPC · JPL |
| 835785 | 2011 UV_{292} | — | October 26, 2011 | Mayhill-ISON | L. Elenin | · | 1.3 km | MPC · JPL |
| 835786 | 2011 UH_{298} | — | October 21, 2011 | Kitt Peak | Spacewatch | NYS | 710 m | MPC · JPL |
| 835787 | 2011 US_{298} | — | October 20, 2011 | Kitt Peak | Spacewatch | · | 1.2 km | MPC · JPL |
| 835788 | 2011 UJ_{308} | — | September 26, 2006 | Kitt Peak | Spacewatch | DOR | 1.5 km | MPC · JPL |
| 835789 | 2011 US_{315} | — | October 20, 2011 | Mount Lemmon | Mount Lemmon Survey | · | 460 m | MPC · JPL |
| 835790 | 2011 UH_{324} | — | February 28, 2008 | Mount Lemmon | Mount Lemmon Survey | · | 2.4 km | MPC · JPL |
| 835791 | 2011 UF_{327} | — | January 9, 2002 | Mount Bohyeon | Bohyunsan Optical Astronomy Observatory | THM | 1.8 km | MPC · JPL |
| 835792 | 2011 UU_{330} | — | October 19, 2003 | Sacramento Peak | SDSS | · | 710 m | MPC · JPL |
| 835793 | 2011 UX_{331} | — | October 25, 2011 | Haleakala | Pan-STARRS 1 | · | 650 m | MPC · JPL |
| 835794 | 2011 UB_{354} | — | May 10, 2010 | WISE | WISE | ELF | 2.5 km | MPC · JPL |
| 835795 | 2011 UE_{355} | — | October 20, 2011 | Mount Lemmon | Mount Lemmon Survey | · | 1.8 km | MPC · JPL |
| 835796 | 2011 UP_{355} | — | October 20, 2011 | Mount Lemmon | Mount Lemmon Survey | EOS | 1.3 km | MPC · JPL |
| 835797 | 2011 UQ_{358} | — | September 25, 2011 | Haleakala | Pan-STARRS 1 | · | 2.3 km | MPC · JPL |
| 835798 | 2011 US_{363} | — | October 22, 2011 | Mount Lemmon | Mount Lemmon Survey | MAS | 490 m | MPC · JPL |
| 835799 | 2011 US_{365} | — | October 22, 2011 | Mount Lemmon | Mount Lemmon Survey | · | 1.5 km | MPC · JPL |
| 835800 | 2011 UY_{367} | — | September 28, 2011 | Kitt Peak | Spacewatch | MAS | 560 m | MPC · JPL |

== 835801–835900 ==
back to top

| Designation | | | Discovery | | | Properties | | Ref |
| Permanent | Provisional | Named after | Date | Site | Discoverer(s) | Category | Diam. | Ref |
|---|---|---|---|---|---|---|---|---|
| 835801 | 2011 UL_{368} | — | October 22, 2011 | Kitt Peak | Spacewatch | THM | 1.4 km | MPC · JPL |
| 835802 | 2011 UQ_{376} | — | September 30, 2011 | Kitt Peak | Spacewatch | · | 1.3 km | MPC · JPL |
| 835803 | 2011 UW_{376} | — | October 23, 2011 | Mount Lemmon | Mount Lemmon Survey | HYG | 2.0 km | MPC · JPL |
| 835804 | 2011 UY_{376} | — | October 23, 2011 | Mount Lemmon | Mount Lemmon Survey | · | 1.4 km | MPC · JPL |
| 835805 | 2011 UM_{378} | — | September 24, 2011 | Haleakala | Pan-STARRS 1 | · | 940 m | MPC · JPL |
| 835806 | 2011 UO_{378} | — | October 23, 2011 | Mount Lemmon | Mount Lemmon Survey | · | 480 m | MPC · JPL |
| 835807 | 2011 UB_{387} | — | December 16, 2007 | Kitt Peak | Spacewatch | EUN | 950 m | MPC · JPL |
| 835808 | 2011 UN_{389} | — | October 1, 2011 | Kitt Peak | Spacewatch | · | 830 m | MPC · JPL |
| 835809 | 2011 UA_{391} | — | October 26, 2011 | Haleakala | Pan-STARRS 1 | · | 2.4 km | MPC · JPL |
| 835810 | 2011 UV_{392} | — | September 24, 2011 | Haleakala | Pan-STARRS 1 | V | 470 m | MPC · JPL |
| 835811 | 2011 UV_{400} | — | October 17, 2011 | Kitt Peak | Spacewatch | · | 2.5 km | MPC · JPL |
| 835812 | 2011 UD_{402} | — | October 25, 2011 | Haleakala | Pan-STARRS 1 | · | 380 m | MPC · JPL |
| 835813 | 2011 UA_{406} | — | September 24, 1960 | Palomar Mountain | C. J. van Houten, I. van Houten-Groeneveld, T. Gehrels | · | 2.3 km | MPC · JPL |
| 835814 | 2011 UR_{406} | — | September 19, 2003 | Anderson Mesa | LONEOS | H | 490 m | MPC · JPL |
| 835815 | 2011 UC_{407} | — | June 8, 2011 | Haleakala | Pan-STARRS 1 | · | 1.8 km | MPC · JPL |
| 835816 | 2011 UB_{408} | — | November 2, 2007 | Mount Lemmon | Mount Lemmon Survey | KON | 1.4 km | MPC · JPL |
| 835817 | 2011 UE_{408} | — | December 18, 2001 | Sacramento Peak | SDSS | · | 3.2 km | MPC · JPL |
| 835818 | 2011 UY_{415} | — | October 20, 2011 | Mount Lemmon | Mount Lemmon Survey | · | 1.3 km | MPC · JPL |
| 835819 | 2011 UN_{417} | — | December 12, 2006 | Kitt Peak | Spacewatch | · | 1.2 km | MPC · JPL |
| 835820 | 2011 UK_{418} | — | January 9, 2007 | Kitt Peak | Spacewatch | · | 2.4 km | MPC · JPL |
| 835821 | 2011 UA_{419} | — | October 25, 2011 | Haleakala | Pan-STARRS 1 | JUN | 720 m | MPC · JPL |
| 835822 | 2011 UN_{421} | — | October 20, 2011 | Mount Lemmon | Mount Lemmon Survey | · | 2.7 km | MPC · JPL |
| 835823 | 2011 UZ_{422} | — | January 28, 2014 | Catalina | CSS | · | 4.0 km | MPC · JPL |
| 835824 | 2011 UY_{423} | — | May 23, 2010 | WISE | WISE | · | 2.3 km | MPC · JPL |
| 835825 | 2011 UG_{424} | — | October 19, 2011 | Kitt Peak | Spacewatch | · | 1.1 km | MPC · JPL |
| 835826 | 2011 UJ_{426} | — | April 12, 2013 | Haleakala | Pan-STARRS 1 | · | 870 m | MPC · JPL |
| 835827 | 2011 UZ_{426} | — | October 25, 2011 | Haleakala | Pan-STARRS 1 | · | 1.3 km | MPC · JPL |
| 835828 | 2011 UM_{427} | — | October 25, 2011 | Haleakala | Pan-STARRS 1 | · | 910 m | MPC · JPL |
| 835829 | 2011 UX_{429} | — | April 14, 2010 | WISE | WISE | · | 1.5 km | MPC · JPL |
| 835830 | 2011 UH_{432} | — | October 20, 2011 | Mount Lemmon | Mount Lemmon Survey | · | 1.1 km | MPC · JPL |
| 835831 | 2011 UX_{432} | — | October 25, 2011 | Haleakala | Pan-STARRS 1 | · | 800 m | MPC · JPL |
| 835832 | 2011 UQ_{433} | — | August 4, 2010 | WISE | WISE | · | 940 m | MPC · JPL |
| 835833 | 2011 UW_{435} | — | May 21, 2014 | Haleakala | Pan-STARRS 1 | · | 700 m | MPC · JPL |
| 835834 | 2011 UD_{436} | — | July 14, 2010 | WISE | WISE | · | 920 m | MPC · JPL |
| 835835 | 2011 UH_{437} | — | October 26, 2011 | Haleakala | Pan-STARRS 1 | · | 430 m | MPC · JPL |
| 835836 | 2011 UP_{437} | — | October 2, 2011 | Piszkéstető | K. Sárneczky | · | 880 m | MPC · JPL |
| 835837 | 2011 UN_{440} | — | October 20, 2011 | Mount Lemmon | Mount Lemmon Survey | · | 720 m | MPC · JPL |
| 835838 | 2011 UJ_{441} | — | July 26, 2010 | WISE | WISE | · | 1.4 km | MPC · JPL |
| 835839 | 2011 UG_{442} | — | March 26, 2010 | WISE | WISE | · | 1.8 km | MPC · JPL |
| 835840 | 2011 UC_{443} | — | May 7, 2014 | Haleakala | Pan-STARRS 1 | · | 1.3 km | MPC · JPL |
| 835841 | 2011 UL_{444} | — | October 3, 2015 | Mount Lemmon | Mount Lemmon Survey | · | 720 m | MPC · JPL |
| 835842 | 2011 UH_{447} | — | October 25, 2011 | Haleakala | Pan-STARRS 1 | · | 1.2 km | MPC · JPL |
| 835843 | 2011 UU_{448} | — | October 26, 2011 | Haleakala | Pan-STARRS 1 | PHO | 630 m | MPC · JPL |
| 835844 | 2011 UW_{449} | — | October 26, 2011 | Haleakala | Pan-STARRS 1 | · | 470 m | MPC · JPL |
| 835845 | 2011 UQ_{454} | — | October 25, 2011 | Haleakala | Pan-STARRS 1 | · | 1.5 km | MPC · JPL |
| 835846 | 2011 UM_{455} | — | October 27, 2011 | Mount Lemmon | Mount Lemmon Survey | EOS | 1.5 km | MPC · JPL |
| 835847 | 2011 UO_{455} | — | October 19, 2011 | Mount Lemmon | Mount Lemmon Survey | HOF | 1.9 km | MPC · JPL |
| 835848 | 2011 UR_{456} | — | October 31, 2011 | Kitt Peak | Spacewatch | · | 1.8 km | MPC · JPL |
| 835849 | 2011 UU_{456} | — | October 25, 2011 | Haleakala | Pan-STARRS 1 | · | 1.2 km | MPC · JPL |
| 835850 | 2011 UK_{461} | — | October 29, 2011 | ESA OGS | ESA OGS | · | 1.3 km | MPC · JPL |
| 835851 | 2011 UH_{462} | — | April 21, 2014 | Mount Lemmon | Mount Lemmon Survey | · | 1.5 km | MPC · JPL |
| 835852 | 2011 UX_{466} | — | October 24, 2011 | Haleakala | Pan-STARRS 1 | (18466) | 1.8 km | MPC · JPL |
| 835853 | 2011 UQ_{468} | — | October 25, 2011 | Haleakala | Pan-STARRS 1 | · | 2.6 km | MPC · JPL |
| 835854 | 2011 UA_{470} | — | October 19, 2011 | Haleakala | Pan-STARRS 1 | · | 1.2 km | MPC · JPL |
| 835855 | 2011 US_{471} | — | October 20, 2011 | Mount Lemmon | Mount Lemmon Survey | · | 1.4 km | MPC · JPL |
| 835856 | 2011 UC_{472} | — | October 18, 2011 | Mount Lemmon | Mount Lemmon Survey | · | 760 m | MPC · JPL |
| 835857 | 2011 UK_{472} | — | October 21, 2011 | Kitt Peak | Spacewatch | · | 1.7 km | MPC · JPL |
| 835858 | 2011 UD_{473} | — | October 16, 1999 | Sacramento Peak | SDSS | · | 2.3 km | MPC · JPL |
| 835859 | 2011 UV_{474} | — | October 25, 2011 | Haleakala | Pan-STARRS 1 | · | 410 m | MPC · JPL |
| 835860 | 2011 UD_{479} | — | October 23, 2011 | Mount Lemmon | Mount Lemmon Survey | EOS | 1.3 km | MPC · JPL |
| 835861 | 2011 UG_{481} | — | October 20, 2011 | Mount Lemmon | Mount Lemmon Survey | · | 1.4 km | MPC · JPL |
| 835862 | 2011 UZ_{482} | — | October 24, 2011 | Haleakala | Pan-STARRS 1 | EOS | 1.2 km | MPC · JPL |
| 835863 | 2011 UL_{485} | — | October 24, 2011 | Haleakala | Pan-STARRS 1 | · | 1.4 km | MPC · JPL |
| 835864 | 2011 UX_{487} | — | October 20, 2011 | Mount Lemmon | Mount Lemmon Survey | EOS | 1.3 km | MPC · JPL |
| 835865 | 2011 UG_{489} | — | October 19, 2011 | Mount Lemmon | Mount Lemmon Survey | · | 1.3 km | MPC · JPL |
| 835866 | 2011 UU_{491} | — | October 19, 2011 | Haleakala | Pan-STARRS 1 | · | 1.2 km | MPC · JPL |
| 835867 | 2011 UX_{493} | — | October 18, 2011 | Haleakala | Pan-STARRS 1 | PHO | 610 m | MPC · JPL |
| 835868 | 2011 UD_{503} | — | October 24, 2011 | Mount Lemmon | Mount Lemmon Survey | · | 860 m | MPC · JPL |
| 835869 | 2011 VQ_{4} | — | April 26, 2010 | WISE | WISE | EUP | 2.7 km | MPC · JPL |
| 835870 | 2011 VF_{5} | — | October 31, 2011 | XuYi | PMO NEO Survey Program | TIR | 3.3 km | MPC · JPL |
| 835871 | 2011 VW_{13} | — | September 14, 2007 | Kitt Peak | Spacewatch | · | 790 m | MPC · JPL |
| 835872 | 2011 VT_{16} | — | November 15, 2011 | Mount Lemmon | Mount Lemmon Survey | · | 520 m | MPC · JPL |
| 835873 | 2011 VF_{20} | — | November 15, 2011 | Kitt Peak | Spacewatch | 3:2 | 3.5 km | MPC · JPL |
| 835874 | 2011 VB_{24} | — | October 14, 2001 | Sacramento Peak | SDSS | · | 1.7 km | MPC · JPL |
| 835875 | 2011 VK_{25} | — | October 13, 1999 | Sacramento Peak | SDSS | THB | 2.8 km | MPC · JPL |
| 835876 | 2011 VB_{29} | — | March 2, 2010 | WISE | WISE | · | 1.3 km | MPC · JPL |
| 835877 | 2011 VD_{31} | — | November 2, 2011 | Mount Lemmon | Mount Lemmon Survey | · | 2.4 km | MPC · JPL |
| 835878 | 2011 VJ_{35} | — | November 3, 2011 | Mount Lemmon | Mount Lemmon Survey | · | 1.5 km | MPC · JPL |
| 835879 | 2011 WU_{1} | — | November 16, 2011 | Mount Lemmon | Mount Lemmon Survey | · | 2.0 km | MPC · JPL |
| 835880 | 2011 WZ_{3} | — | November 17, 2011 | Mount Lemmon | Mount Lemmon Survey | (1547) | 1.4 km | MPC · JPL |
| 835881 | 2011 WO_{7} | — | October 30, 2011 | Kitt Peak | Spacewatch | · | 1.3 km | MPC · JPL |
| 835882 | 2011 WF_{13} | — | November 15, 2006 | Kitt Peak | Spacewatch | KOR | 930 m | MPC · JPL |
| 835883 | 2011 WY_{16} | — | October 26, 2011 | Haleakala | Pan-STARRS 1 | · | 1.9 km | MPC · JPL |
| 835884 | 2011 WJ_{24} | — | October 21, 2011 | Mount Lemmon | Mount Lemmon Survey | KOR | 1.2 km | MPC · JPL |
| 835885 | 2011 WQ_{32} | — | January 17, 2005 | Kitt Peak | Spacewatch | · | 730 m | MPC · JPL |
| 835886 | 2011 WL_{40} | — | November 16, 2011 | Mount Lemmon | Mount Lemmon Survey | · | 620 m | MPC · JPL |
| 835887 | 2011 WQ_{40} | — | November 23, 2011 | Mount Lemmon | Mount Lemmon Survey | · | 1.1 km | MPC · JPL |
| 835888 | 2011 WF_{42} | — | November 23, 2011 | Mayhill-ISON | L. Elenin | · | 1.4 km | MPC · JPL |
| 835889 | 2011 WM_{46} | — | November 26, 2011 | Haleakala | Pan-STARRS 1 | AMO | 400 m | MPC · JPL |
| 835890 | 2011 WN_{47} | — | September 24, 2011 | Mount Lemmon | Mount Lemmon Survey | · | 740 m | MPC · JPL |
| 835891 | 2011 WC_{58} | — | February 1, 2008 | Kitt Peak | Spacewatch | (21344) | 1.3 km | MPC · JPL |
| 835892 | 2011 WD_{59} | — | January 13, 2004 | Kitt Peak | Spacewatch | (5) | 760 m | MPC · JPL |
| 835893 | 2011 WO_{68} | — | July 4, 2010 | WISE | WISE | PHO | 1.7 km | MPC · JPL |
| 835894 | 2011 WM_{73} | — | January 12, 2002 | Cerro Tololo | Deep Lens Survey | · | 2.4 km | MPC · JPL |
| 835895 | 2011 WO_{77} | — | February 1, 2006 | Mount Lemmon | Mount Lemmon Survey | · | 430 m | MPC · JPL |
| 835896 | 2011 WG_{81} | — | October 26, 2011 | Haleakala | Pan-STARRS 1 | · | 560 m | MPC · JPL |
| 835897 | 2011 WS_{81} | — | October 23, 2011 | Kitt Peak | Spacewatch | · | 950 m | MPC · JPL |
| 835898 | 2011 WQ_{82} | — | October 26, 2011 | Haleakala | Pan-STARRS 1 | MAS | 600 m | MPC · JPL |
| 835899 | 2011 WY_{84} | — | November 24, 2011 | Haleakala | Pan-STARRS 1 | · | 610 m | MPC · JPL |
| 835900 | 2011 WG_{88} | — | November 24, 2011 | Mount Lemmon | Mount Lemmon Survey | · | 1.4 km | MPC · JPL |

== 835901–836000 ==
back to top

| Designation | | | Discovery | | | Properties | | Ref |
| Permanent | Provisional | Named after | Date | Site | Discoverer(s) | Category | Diam. | Ref |
|---|---|---|---|---|---|---|---|---|
| 835901 | 2011 WL_{98} | — | October 8, 2007 | Kitt Peak | Spacewatch | · | 750 m | MPC · JPL |
| 835902 | 2011 WM_{110} | — | October 26, 2011 | Haleakala | Pan-STARRS 1 | · | 1.8 km | MPC · JPL |
| 835903 | 2011 WJ_{116} | — | July 19, 2002 | Palomar | NEAT | · | 1.2 km | MPC · JPL |
| 835904 | 2011 WR_{117} | — | September 11, 2007 | Mount Lemmon | Mount Lemmon Survey | · | 810 m | MPC · JPL |
| 835905 | 2011 WL_{119} | — | February 21, 2001 | Sacramento Peak | SDSS | · | 1.2 km | MPC · JPL |
| 835906 | 2011 WP_{121} | — | November 16, 2011 | Mount Lemmon | Mount Lemmon Survey | KOR | 920 m | MPC · JPL |
| 835907 | 2011 WK_{127} | — | June 9, 2010 | WISE | WISE | 3:2 | 4.7 km | MPC · JPL |
| 835908 | 2011 WQ_{127} | — | October 28, 2011 | Mount Lemmon | Mount Lemmon Survey | · | 920 m | MPC · JPL |
| 835909 | 2011 WN_{132} | — | October 23, 2011 | Haleakala | Pan-STARRS 1 | · | 1.1 km | MPC · JPL |
| 835910 | 2011 WZ_{132} | — | April 13, 2010 | WISE | WISE | · | 3.3 km | MPC · JPL |
| 835911 | 2011 WA_{133} | — | May 25, 2010 | WISE | WISE | EUP | 3.5 km | MPC · JPL |
| 835912 | 2011 WV_{136} | — | October 1, 2011 | Kitt Peak | Spacewatch | · | 700 m | MPC · JPL |
| 835913 | 2011 WB_{144} | — | November 3, 2011 | Kitt Peak | Spacewatch | LIX | 2.9 km | MPC · JPL |
| 835914 | 2011 WC_{149} | — | October 26, 2011 | Haleakala | Pan-STARRS 1 | · | 530 m | MPC · JPL |
| 835915 | 2011 WT_{151} | — | November 1, 2011 | Catalina | CSS | · | 2.0 km | MPC · JPL |
| 835916 | 2011 WU_{158} | — | November 30, 2011 | Kitt Peak | Spacewatch | HNS | 910 m | MPC · JPL |
| 835917 | 2011 WQ_{161} | — | March 1, 2010 | WISE | WISE | · | 1.1 km | MPC · JPL |
| 835918 | 2011 WL_{162} | — | July 12, 2016 | Haleakala | Pan-STARRS 1 | · | 3.1 km | MPC · JPL |
| 835919 | 2011 WM_{163} | — | November 24, 2011 | Mount Lemmon | Mount Lemmon Survey | · | 830 m | MPC · JPL |
| 835920 | 2011 WV_{163} | — | November 18, 2011 | Mount Lemmon | Mount Lemmon Survey | · | 830 m | MPC · JPL |
| 835921 | 2011 WC_{166} | — | May 15, 2010 | WISE | WISE | · | 1.9 km | MPC · JPL |
| 835922 | 2011 WX_{170} | — | January 8, 2016 | Haleakala | Pan-STARRS 1 | · | 660 m | MPC · JPL |
| 835923 | 2011 WC_{171} | — | March 30, 2010 | WISE | WISE | · | 1.6 km | MPC · JPL |
| 835924 | 2011 WL_{171} | — | June 8, 2010 | WISE | WISE | · | 1.7 km | MPC · JPL |
| 835925 | 2011 WO_{171} | — | January 28, 2017 | Haleakala | Pan-STARRS 1 | · | 1.1 km | MPC · JPL |
| 835926 | 2011 WP_{173} | — | September 23, 2015 | Haleakala | Pan-STARRS 1 | NEM | 1.7 km | MPC · JPL |
| 835927 | 2011 WF_{175} | — | November 30, 2011 | Mount Lemmon | Mount Lemmon Survey | · | 740 m | MPC · JPL |
| 835928 | 2011 WP_{175} | — | November 18, 2011 | Mount Lemmon | Mount Lemmon Survey | · | 1.6 km | MPC · JPL |
| 835929 | 2011 WJ_{177} | — | November 30, 2011 | Mount Lemmon | Mount Lemmon Survey | · | 1.9 km | MPC · JPL |
| 835930 | 2011 YQ_{4} | — | November 27, 2000 | Sacramento Peak | SDSS | L4 | 20 km | MPC · JPL |
| 835931 | 2011 YL_{17} | — | December 24, 2011 | Mount Lemmon | Mount Lemmon Survey | · | 2.2 km | MPC · JPL |
| 835932 | 2011 YO_{18} | — | May 9, 2010 | WISE | WISE | · | 2.5 km | MPC · JPL |
| 835933 | 2011 YK_{20} | — | June 17, 2010 | WISE | WISE | · | 2.0 km | MPC · JPL |
| 835934 | 2011 YJ_{24} | — | November 28, 2011 | Mount Lemmon | Mount Lemmon Survey | · | 700 m | MPC · JPL |
| 835935 | 2011 YR_{24} | — | December 25, 2011 | Kitt Peak | Spacewatch | · | 850 m | MPC · JPL |
| 835936 | 2011 YY_{27} | — | December 28, 2011 | Kitt Peak | Spacewatch | L4 | 7.9 km | MPC · JPL |
| 835937 | 2011 YG_{32} | — | December 26, 2011 | Kitt Peak | Spacewatch | · | 500 m | MPC · JPL |
| 835938 | 2011 YY_{35} | — | November 30, 2011 | Mount Lemmon | Mount Lemmon Survey | · | 1.1 km | MPC · JPL |
| 835939 | 2011 YC_{41} | — | December 1, 2011 | Haleakala | Pan-STARRS 1 | · | 1.9 km | MPC · JPL |
| 835940 | 2011 YA_{42} | — | June 1, 2010 | WISE | WISE | LUT | 3.6 km | MPC · JPL |
| 835941 | 2011 YG_{45} | — | December 27, 2011 | Kitt Peak | Spacewatch | · | 1.2 km | MPC · JPL |
| 835942 | 2011 YC_{51} | — | May 25, 2010 | WISE | WISE | (194) | 1.8 km | MPC · JPL |
| 835943 | 2011 YX_{51} | — | December 31, 2011 | Mount Lemmon | Mount Lemmon Survey | · | 440 m | MPC · JPL |
| 835944 | 2011 YC_{58} | — | November 28, 2011 | Mount Lemmon | Mount Lemmon Survey | · | 2.1 km | MPC · JPL |
| 835945 | 2011 YE_{62} | — | July 21, 2010 | WISE | WISE | · | 2.7 km | MPC · JPL |
| 835946 | 2011 YK_{62} | — | October 28, 2005 | Mount Lemmon | Mount Lemmon Survey | (31811) | 2.1 km | MPC · JPL |
| 835947 | 2011 YP_{71} | — | December 26, 2011 | Kitt Peak | Spacewatch | · | 2.4 km | MPC · JPL |
| 835948 | 2011 YZ_{72} | — | November 11, 2007 | Mount Lemmon | Mount Lemmon Survey | · | 800 m | MPC · JPL |
| 835949 | 2011 YM_{73} | — | December 30, 2011 | Kitt Peak | Spacewatch | EUP | 2.4 km | MPC · JPL |
| 835950 | 2011 YD_{80} | — | December 27, 2011 | Mount Lemmon | Mount Lemmon Survey | · | 1.6 km | MPC · JPL |
| 835951 | 2011 YC_{83} | — | July 10, 2010 | WISE | WISE | · | 2.9 km | MPC · JPL |
| 835952 | 2011 YV_{83} | — | December 26, 2011 | Mount Lemmon | Mount Lemmon Survey | · | 2.3 km | MPC · JPL |
| 835953 | 2011 YB_{85} | — | September 29, 2005 | Mount Lemmon | Mount Lemmon Survey | · | 1.8 km | MPC · JPL |
| 835954 | 2011 YG_{89} | — | September 10, 2015 | Haleakala | Pan-STARRS 1 | · | 1.2 km | MPC · JPL |
| 835955 | 2011 YN_{89} | — | December 29, 2011 | Mount Lemmon | Mount Lemmon Survey | · | 1.4 km | MPC · JPL |
| 835956 | 2011 YD_{91} | — | December 29, 2011 | Mount Lemmon | Mount Lemmon Survey | V | 460 m | MPC · JPL |
| 835957 | 2011 YH_{91} | — | December 29, 2011 | Mount Lemmon | Mount Lemmon Survey | EUP | 2.2 km | MPC · JPL |
| 835958 | 2011 YA_{93} | — | December 29, 2011 | Mount Lemmon | Mount Lemmon Survey | EOS | 1.6 km | MPC · JPL |
| 835959 | 2011 YE_{94} | — | December 27, 2011 | Mount Lemmon | Mount Lemmon Survey | · | 2.1 km | MPC · JPL |
| 835960 | 2011 YR_{97} | — | December 29, 2011 | Mount Lemmon | Mount Lemmon Survey | · | 1.5 km | MPC · JPL |
| 835961 | 2011 YE_{98} | — | December 27, 2011 | Mount Lemmon | Mount Lemmon Survey | EOS | 1.2 km | MPC · JPL |
| 835962 | 2012 AD_{1} | — | January 3, 2012 | Catalina | CSS | · | 1.8 km | MPC · JPL |
| 835963 | 2012 AF_{6} | — | November 27, 2011 | Mount Lemmon | Mount Lemmon Survey | · | 1.9 km | MPC · JPL |
| 835964 | 2012 AD_{7} | — | July 15, 2010 | WISE | WISE | · | 4.2 km | MPC · JPL |
| 835965 | 2012 AV_{9} | — | August 8, 2010 | WISE | WISE | (7605) | 2.8 km | MPC · JPL |
| 835966 | 2012 AR_{20} | — | January 13, 2010 | WISE | WISE | L4 | 8.6 km | MPC · JPL |
| 835967 | 2012 AR_{26} | — | January 6, 2012 | Kitt Peak | Spacewatch | · | 2.1 km | MPC · JPL |
| 835968 | 2012 AA_{29} | — | May 16, 2010 | WISE | WISE | · | 1.9 km | MPC · JPL |
| 835969 | 2012 AH_{29} | — | December 6, 2015 | Mount Lemmon | Mount Lemmon Survey | EUN | 810 m | MPC · JPL |
| 835970 | 2012 AJ_{29} | — | January 1, 2012 | Mount Lemmon | Mount Lemmon Survey | · | 1.2 km | MPC · JPL |
| 835971 | 2012 AK_{29} | — | January 2, 2012 | Mount Lemmon | Mount Lemmon Survey | · | 1.0 km | MPC · JPL |
| 835972 | 2012 AO_{29} | — | January 3, 2016 | Haleakala | Pan-STARRS 1 | PHO | 660 m | MPC · JPL |
| 835973 | 2012 AT_{30} | — | July 18, 2010 | WISE | WISE | URS | 2.7 km | MPC · JPL |
| 835974 | 2012 AC_{31} | — | November 28, 2011 | Mount Lemmon | Mount Lemmon Survey | · | 810 m | MPC · JPL |
| 835975 | 2012 AV_{31} | — | January 1, 2012 | Mount Lemmon | Mount Lemmon Survey | EOS | 1.3 km | MPC · JPL |
| 835976 | 2012 AP_{32} | — | January 1, 2012 | Mount Lemmon | Mount Lemmon Survey | EOS | 1.6 km | MPC · JPL |
| 835977 | 2012 AQ_{33} | — | January 14, 2012 | Mount Lemmon | Mount Lemmon Survey | L4 | 7.3 km | MPC · JPL |
| 835978 | 2012 AU_{33} | — | January 2, 2012 | Mount Lemmon | Mount Lemmon Survey | · | 1.7 km | MPC · JPL |
| 835979 | 2012 AV_{33} | — | January 1, 2012 | Mount Lemmon | Mount Lemmon Survey | · | 2.6 km | MPC · JPL |
| 835980 | 2012 AJ_{34} | — | January 2, 2012 | Kitt Peak | Spacewatch | EOS | 1.3 km | MPC · JPL |
| 835981 | 2012 AD_{35} | — | January 2, 2012 | Mount Lemmon | Mount Lemmon Survey | · | 1.9 km | MPC · JPL |
| 835982 | 2012 AK_{36} | — | January 1, 2012 | Mount Lemmon | Mount Lemmon Survey | · | 1.6 km | MPC · JPL |
| 835983 | 2012 AK_{37} | — | January 2, 2012 | Kitt Peak | Spacewatch | · | 2.3 km | MPC · JPL |
| 835984 | 2012 AM_{38} | — | January 1, 2012 | Mount Lemmon | Mount Lemmon Survey | KON | 1.5 km | MPC · JPL |
| 835985 | 2012 AW_{38} | — | January 2, 2012 | Kitt Peak | Spacewatch | LIX | 2.3 km | MPC · JPL |
| 835986 | 2012 BU_{7} | — | February 23, 2007 | Kitt Peak | Spacewatch | · | 1.3 km | MPC · JPL |
| 835987 | 2012 BR_{13} | — | January 20, 2012 | Mount Lemmon | Mount Lemmon Survey | H | 390 m | MPC · JPL |
| 835988 | 2012 BE_{18} | — | January 19, 2012 | Haleakala | Pan-STARRS 1 | · | 2.8 km | MPC · JPL |
| 835989 | 2012 BR_{22} | — | May 4, 2010 | WISE | WISE | · | 2.8 km | MPC · JPL |
| 835990 | 2012 BV_{27} | — | January 21, 2012 | Haleakala | Pan-STARRS 1 | · | 2.2 km | MPC · JPL |
| 835991 | 2012 BN_{29} | — | January 4, 2012 | Kitt Peak | Spacewatch | H | 470 m | MPC · JPL |
| 835992 | 2012 BL_{30} | — | January 19, 2012 | Haleakala | Pan-STARRS 1 | H | 340 m | MPC · JPL |
| 835993 | 2012 BG_{32} | — | December 29, 2011 | Mount Lemmon | Mount Lemmon Survey | · | 2.5 km | MPC · JPL |
| 835994 | 2012 BH_{38} | — | January 19, 2012 | Mount Lemmon | Mount Lemmon Survey | · | 1.3 km | MPC · JPL |
| 835995 | 2012 BX_{38} | — | January 19, 2012 | Mount Lemmon | Mount Lemmon Survey | · | 750 m | MPC · JPL |
| 835996 | 2012 BA_{46} | — | January 2, 2012 | Kitt Peak | Spacewatch | · | 1.4 km | MPC · JPL |
| 835997 | 2012 BR_{46} | — | January 18, 2012 | Mount Lemmon | Mount Lemmon Survey | L4 | 6.1 km | MPC · JPL |
| 835998 | 2012 BH_{52} | — | December 28, 2011 | Mount Lemmon | Mount Lemmon Survey | · | 2.1 km | MPC · JPL |
| 835999 | 2012 BG_{57} | — | December 28, 2011 | Kitt Peak | Spacewatch | · | 920 m | MPC · JPL |
| 836000 | 2012 BM_{57} | — | December 27, 2011 | Mount Lemmon | Mount Lemmon Survey | · | 1.6 km | MPC · JPL |

back to top
