= List of minor planets: 817001–818000 =

The following is a partial list of minor planets, running from minor-planet number 817001 through 818000, inclusive. The primary data for this and other partial lists is based on JPL's "Small-Body Orbital Elements" and data available from the Minor Planet Center. Critical list information is also provided by the MPC, unless otherwise specified from Lowell Observatory. A detailed description of the table's columns and additional sources are given on the main page including a complete list of every page in this series, and a statistical break-up on the dynamical classification of minor planets.

Also see the summary list of all named bodies in numerical and alphabetical order, and the corresponding naming citations for the number range of this particular list. New namings may only be added to this list after official publication, as the preannouncement of names is condemned by the Working Group for Small Bodies Nomenclature of the International Astronomical Union.

Near-Earth obj.	MBA (inner)	MBA (outer)	Centaur
Mars-crosser	MBA (middle)	Jupiter trojan	Trans-Neptunian obj.
Unclassified

== 817001–817100 ==
Designation			Discovery			Properties		Ref
Permanent	Provisional	Named after	Date	Site	Discoverer(s)	Category	Diam.	Ref
817001	2011 WG_{177}	—	November 24, 2011	Haleakala	Pan-STARRS 1	·	1 km	MPC · JPL
817002	2011 WZ_{177}	—	November 29, 2011	Kitt Peak	Spacewatch	·	1.7 km	MPC · JPL
817003	2011 WR_{180}	—	November 28, 2011	Kitt Peak	Spacewatch	·	1.4 km	MPC · JPL
817004	2011 WF_{183}	—	November 24, 2011	Mount Lemmon	Mount Lemmon Survey	EOS	1.4 km	MPC · JPL
817005	2011 WC_{186}	—	November 24, 2011	Mount Lemmon	Mount Lemmon Survey	·	2.6 km	MPC · JPL
817006	2011 XF_{5}	—	May 28, 2014	Haleakala	Pan-STARRS 1	·	1.1 km	MPC · JPL
817007	2011 XG_{6}	—	May 7, 2014	Haleakala	Pan-STARRS 1	·	1.3 km	MPC · JPL
817008	2011 YC_{16}	—	December 22, 2011	Nizhny Arkhyz	V. Gerke, A. Novichonok	·	1.7 km	MPC · JPL
817009	2011 YG_{16}	—	November 17, 2011	Kitt Peak	Spacewatch	·	900 m	MPC · JPL
817010	2011 YS_{20}	—	August 19, 2002	Palomar	NEAT	·	930 m	MPC · JPL
817011	2011 YF_{22}	—	December 25, 2011	Kitt Peak	Spacewatch	PHO	700 m	MPC · JPL
817012	2011 YY_{26}	—	November 1, 2011	Mount Lemmon	Mount Lemmon Survey	MAR	850 m	MPC · JPL
817013	2011 YZ_{29}	—	December 16, 2011	Catalina	CSS	BAR	1.2 km	MPC · JPL
817014	2011 YR_{32}	—	December 26, 2011	Kitt Peak	Spacewatch	·	2.2 km	MPC · JPL
817015	2011 YB_{47}	—	December 27, 2011	Kitt Peak	Spacewatch	·	900 m	MPC · JPL
817016	2011 YB_{51}	—	September 14, 2006	Kitt Peak	Spacewatch	·	1.4 km	MPC · JPL
817017	2011 YZ_{55}	—	December 29, 2011	Kitt Peak	Spacewatch	·	850 m	MPC · JPL
817018	2011 YK_{63}	—	December 29, 2011	Kitt Peak	Spacewatch	H	370 m	MPC · JPL
817019	2011 YE_{69}	—	September 3, 2007	Catalina	CSS	·	800 m	MPC · JPL
817020	2011 YK_{76}	—	December 30, 2011	Mount Lemmon	Mount Lemmon Survey	·	2.2 km	MPC · JPL
817021	2011 YW_{77}	—	October 26, 2011	Haleakala	Pan-STARRS 1	·	600 m	MPC · JPL
817022	2011 YF_{80}	—	December 29, 2011	Mount Lemmon	Mount Lemmon Survey	·	2.2 km	MPC · JPL
817023	2011 YJ_{82}	—	November 23, 2014	Mount Lemmon	Mount Lemmon Survey	·	530 m	MPC · JPL
817024	2011 YS_{83}	—	December 28, 2011	Mount Lemmon	Mount Lemmon Survey	·	2.1 km	MPC · JPL
817025	2011 YJ_{84}	—	September 19, 2014	Haleakala	Pan-STARRS 1	·	510 m	MPC · JPL
817026	2011 YE_{86}	—	December 26, 2011	Mount Lemmon	Mount Lemmon Survey	·	1.2 km	MPC · JPL
817027	2011 YK_{89}	—	June 26, 2015	Haleakala	Pan-STARRS 1	EOS	1.4 km	MPC · JPL
817028	2012 AH_{1}	—	November 28, 2011	Mount Lemmon	Mount Lemmon Survey	·	900 m	MPC · JPL
817029	2012 AO_{8}	—	December 27, 2006	Mount Lemmon	Mount Lemmon Survey	·	1.7 km	MPC · JPL
817030	2012 AO_{17}	—	December 24, 2011	Mount Lemmon	Mount Lemmon Survey	PHO	1.1 km	MPC · JPL
817031	2012 AG_{21}	—	January 10, 2007	Mount Lemmon	Mount Lemmon Survey	H	430 m	MPC · JPL
817032	2012 AJ_{25}	—	January 3, 2012	Kitt Peak	Spacewatch	·	1.7 km	MPC · JPL
817033	2012 AC_{27}	—	January 1, 2012	Mount Lemmon	Mount Lemmon Survey	H	340 m	MPC · JPL
817034	2012 AY_{31}	—	January 1, 2012	Mount Lemmon	Mount Lemmon Survey	·	1.6 km	MPC · JPL
817035	2012 AF_{32}	—	January 14, 2012	Mount Lemmon	Mount Lemmon Survey	·	970 m	MPC · JPL
817036	2012 AU_{32}	—	January 2, 2012	Mount Lemmon	Mount Lemmon Survey	·	1.6 km	MPC · JPL
817037	2012 BS_{2}	—	January 18, 2012	Kitt Peak	Spacewatch	H	450 m	MPC · JPL
817038	2012 BE_{6}	—	January 18, 2012	Mount Lemmon	Mount Lemmon Survey	·	550 m	MPC · JPL
817039	2012 BF_{6}	—	January 18, 2012	Mount Lemmon	Mount Lemmon Survey	·	440 m	MPC · JPL
817040	2012 BE_{13}	—	November 3, 2011	Catalina	CSS	·	1.3 km	MPC · JPL
817041	2012 BH_{17}	—	January 15, 2012	Westfield	International Astronomical Search Collaboration	PHO	750 m	MPC · JPL
817042	2012 BU_{25}	—	January 1, 2012	Mount Lemmon	Mount Lemmon Survey	·	1.9 km	MPC · JPL
817043	2012 BV_{38}	—	January 19, 2012	Mount Lemmon	Mount Lemmon Survey	·	990 m	MPC · JPL
817044	2012 BO_{42}	—	October 13, 2006	Kitt Peak	Spacewatch	·	980 m	MPC · JPL
817045	2012 BH_{45}	—	January 19, 2012	Mount Lemmon	Mount Lemmon Survey	V	410 m	MPC · JPL
817046	2012 BX_{45}	—	August 26, 2003	Cerro Tololo	Deep Ecliptic Survey	·	640 m	MPC · JPL
817047	2012 BM_{48}	—	January 20, 2012	Mount Lemmon	Mount Lemmon Survey	·	890 m	MPC · JPL
817048	2012 BU_{53}	—	January 21, 2012	Haleakala	Pan-STARRS 1	·	2.9 km	MPC · JPL
817049	2012 BN_{63}	—	January 20, 2012	Mount Lemmon	Mount Lemmon Survey	·	500 m	MPC · JPL
817050	2012 BV_{63}	—	June 21, 2009	Kitt Peak	Spacewatch	·	1.9 km	MPC · JPL
817051	2012 BW_{63}	—	January 2, 2012	Kitt Peak	Spacewatch	EOS	1.5 km	MPC · JPL
817052	2012 BY_{68}	—	January 21, 2012	Kitt Peak	Spacewatch	H	310 m	MPC · JPL
817053	2012 BD_{72}	—	January 21, 2012	Kitt Peak	Spacewatch	·	720 m	MPC · JPL
817054	2012 BV_{76}	—	January 20, 2012	Mount Lemmon	Mount Lemmon Survey	H	320 m	MPC · JPL
817055	2012 BL_{85}	—	January 21, 2012	Catalina	CSS	·	3.1 km	MPC · JPL
817056	2012 BZ_{95}	—	January 19, 2012	Haleakala	Pan-STARRS 1	EUP	2.9 km	MPC · JPL
817057	2012 BZ_{96}	—	December 29, 2011	Mount Lemmon	Mount Lemmon Survey	L4	6.6 km	MPC · JPL
817058	2012 BA_{98}	—	May 3, 2008	Catalina	CSS	·	1.3 km	MPC · JPL
817059	2012 BE_{101}	—	January 19, 2012	Haleakala	Pan-STARRS 1	·	490 m	MPC · JPL
817060	2012 BU_{119}	—	January 27, 2012	Mount Lemmon	Mount Lemmon Survey	EOS	1.4 km	MPC · JPL
817061	2012 BK_{122}	—	January 30, 2012	Kitt Peak	Spacewatch	MAS	580 m	MPC · JPL
817062	2012 BN_{134}	—	January 25, 2012	Haleakala	Pan-STARRS 1	H	360 m	MPC · JPL
817063	2012 BR_{140}	—	January 1, 2012	Mount Lemmon	Mount Lemmon Survey	·	2.0 km	MPC · JPL
817064	2012 BG_{142}	—	January 27, 2012	Mount Lemmon	Mount Lemmon Survey	·	830 m	MPC · JPL
817065	2012 BB_{143}	—	January 24, 2012	Haleakala	Pan-STARRS 1	·	1.8 km	MPC · JPL
817066	2012 BL_{153}	—	September 4, 2015	Kitt Peak	Spacewatch	·	2.1 km	MPC · JPL
817067	2012 BP_{159}	—	January 27, 2012	Mount Lemmon	Mount Lemmon Survey	·	820 m	MPC · JPL
817068	2012 BY_{160}	—	January 11, 2016	Haleakala	Pan-STARRS 1	PHO	1.2 km	MPC · JPL
817069	2012 BK_{161}	—	January 4, 2017	Haleakala	Pan-STARRS 1	·	1.6 km	MPC · JPL
817070	2012 BW_{161}	—	January 19, 2012	Kitt Peak	Spacewatch	NYS	800 m	MPC · JPL
817071	2012 BD_{162}	—	January 30, 2012	Mount Lemmon	Mount Lemmon Survey	·	900 m	MPC · JPL
817072	2012 BQ_{163}	—	January 19, 2012	Haleakala	Pan-STARRS 1	·	2.9 km	MPC · JPL
817073	2012 BD_{164}	—	June 4, 2013	Kitt Peak	Spacewatch	EUP	2.5 km	MPC · JPL
817074	2012 BQ_{167}	—	January 26, 2012	Haleakala	Pan-STARRS 1	H	330 m	MPC · JPL
817075	2012 BE_{168}	—	November 12, 2015	Mount Lemmon	Mount Lemmon Survey	·	1.0 km	MPC · JPL
817076	2012 BS_{168}	—	January 19, 2012	Haleakala	Pan-STARRS 1	·	2.0 km	MPC · JPL
817077	2012 BF_{169}	—	January 27, 2012	Mount Lemmon	Mount Lemmon Survey	·	2.4 km	MPC · JPL
817078	2012 BR_{169}	—	March 13, 2016	Haleakala	Pan-STARRS 1	·	510 m	MPC · JPL
817079	2012 BZ_{169}	—	October 28, 2017	Mount Lemmon	Mount Lemmon Survey	·	490 m	MPC · JPL
817080	2012 BD_{170}	—	November 21, 2014	Haleakala	Pan-STARRS 1	·	1.4 km	MPC · JPL
817081	2012 BB_{173}	—	November 3, 2016	Haleakala	Pan-STARRS 1	·	2.3 km	MPC · JPL
817082	2012 BB_{175}	—	January 19, 2012	Haleakala	Pan-STARRS 1	·	2.2 km	MPC · JPL
817083	2012 BU_{175}	—	January 27, 2012	Mount Lemmon	Mount Lemmon Survey	PHO	750 m	MPC · JPL
817084	2012 BT_{178}	—	January 27, 2012	Mount Lemmon	Mount Lemmon Survey	EOS	1.4 km	MPC · JPL
817085	2012 BN_{179}	—	January 26, 2012	Mount Lemmon	Mount Lemmon Survey	EUP	2.9 km	MPC · JPL
817086	2012 BL_{182}	—	January 26, 2012	Mount Lemmon	Mount Lemmon Survey	·	2.5 km	MPC · JPL
817087	2012 BT_{186}	—	January 30, 2012	Mount Lemmon	Mount Lemmon Survey	·	620 m	MPC · JPL
817088	2012 BT_{189}	—	January 19, 2012	Kitt Peak	Spacewatch	·	2.9 km	MPC · JPL
817089	2012 BQ_{191}	—	January 26, 2012	Mount Lemmon	Mount Lemmon Survey	·	810 m	MPC · JPL
817090	2012 CK_{1}	—	February 1, 2012	Kitt Peak	Spacewatch	·	860 m	MPC · JPL
817091	2012 CF_{2}	—	October 11, 2010	Mount Lemmon	Mount Lemmon Survey	·	1.9 km	MPC · JPL
817092	2012 CQ_{8}	—	February 3, 2012	Haleakala	Pan-STARRS 1	·	960 m	MPC · JPL
817093	2012 CM_{10}	—	February 3, 2012	Haleakala	Pan-STARRS 1	·	770 m	MPC · JPL
817094	2012 CF_{17}	—	February 3, 2012	Haleakala	Pan-STARRS 1	H	390 m	MPC · JPL
817095	2012 CK_{17}	—	February 3, 2012	Mount Lemmon	Mount Lemmon Survey	·	2.7 km	MPC · JPL
817096	2012 CX_{19}	—	January 26, 2012	Haleakala	Pan-STARRS 1	·	490 m	MPC · JPL
817097	2012 CS_{22}	—	January 4, 2012	Mount Lemmon	Mount Lemmon Survey	·	2.4 km	MPC · JPL
817098	2012 CK_{25}	—	September 20, 2003	Socorro	LINEAR	·	1.1 km	MPC · JPL
817099	2012 CO_{30}	—	January 30, 2012	Kitt Peak	Spacewatch	DOR	2.2 km	MPC · JPL
817100	2012 CB_{33}	—	January 18, 2012	Kitt Peak	Spacewatch	·	1.9 km	MPC · JPL

== 817101–817200 ==
back to top

Designation			Discovery			Properties		Ref
Permanent	Provisional	Named after	Date	Site	Discoverer(s)	Category	Diam.	Ref
817101	2012 CP_{34}	—	January 26, 2012	Mount Lemmon	Mount Lemmon Survey	EOS	1.4 km	MPC · JPL
817102	2012 CO_{35}	—	February 3, 2012	Haleakala	Pan-STARRS 1	·	2.3 km	MPC · JPL
817103	2012 CL_{36}	—	February 13, 2012	Haleakala	Pan-STARRS 1	H	450 m	MPC · JPL
817104	2012 CQ_{38}	—	February 3, 2012	Mount Lemmon	Mount Lemmon Survey	·	570 m	MPC · JPL
817105	2012 CF_{41}	—	January 21, 2012	Kitt Peak	Spacewatch	·	1.9 km	MPC · JPL
817106	2012 CZ_{43}	—	February 13, 2012	Kitt Peak	Spacewatch	H	340 m	MPC · JPL
817107	2012 CT_{44}	—	January 19, 2012	Haleakala	Pan-STARRS 1	·	2.1 km	MPC · JPL
817108	2012 CM_{53}	—	February 15, 2012	Haleakala	Pan-STARRS 1	H	340 m	MPC · JPL
817109	2012 CO_{55}	—	February 1, 2012	Kitt Peak	Spacewatch	·	760 m	MPC · JPL
817110	2012 CX_{61}	—	February 4, 2012	Haleakala	Pan-STARRS 1	·	1.7 km	MPC · JPL
817111	2012 CX_{69}	—	February 1, 2012	Mount Lemmon	Mount Lemmon Survey	·	1.2 km	MPC · JPL
817112	2012 CH_{71}	—	February 3, 2012	Haleakala	Pan-STARRS 1	·	2.4 km	MPC · JPL
817113	2012 CV_{72}	—	February 14, 2012	Haleakala	Pan-STARRS 1	·	2.2 km	MPC · JPL
817114	2012 CW_{72}	—	February 1, 2012	Mount Lemmon	Mount Lemmon Survey	·	450 m	MPC · JPL
817115	2012 DN_{6}	—	January 18, 2012	Kitt Peak	Spacewatch	·	2.2 km	MPC · JPL
817116	2012 DP_{20}	—	August 5, 2002	Palomar	NEAT	·	2.7 km	MPC · JPL
817117	2012 DT_{23}	—	February 21, 2012	Kitt Peak	Spacewatch	·	550 m	MPC · JPL
817118	2012 DG_{24}	—	February 21, 2012	Mount Lemmon	Mount Lemmon Survey	·	940 m	MPC · JPL
817119	2012 DR_{41}	—	April 21, 2009	Mount Lemmon	Mount Lemmon Survey	·	590 m	MPC · JPL
817120 Andreirăzvan	2012 DZ_{42}	Andreirăzvan	February 26, 2012	Roque de los Muchachos	EURONEAR	·	2.1 km	MPC · JPL
817121	2012 DD_{54}	—	February 26, 2012	Catalina	CSS	H	460 m	MPC · JPL
817122	2012 DA_{57}	—	April 14, 2004	Socorro	LINEAR	·	990 m	MPC · JPL
817123	2012 DN_{60}	—	January 22, 2012	Haleakala	Pan-STARRS 1	H	430 m	MPC · JPL
817124	2012 DX_{64}	—	February 13, 2012	Haleakala	Pan-STARRS 1	·	960 m	MPC · JPL
817125	2012 DW_{65}	—	February 16, 2012	Haleakala	Pan-STARRS 1	·	1.5 km	MPC · JPL
817126	2012 DG_{77}	—	February 28, 2012	Haleakala	Pan-STARRS 1	H	370 m	MPC · JPL
817127	2012 DN_{80}	—	January 30, 2012	Kitt Peak	Spacewatch	·	980 m	MPC · JPL
817128	2012 DW_{82}	—	February 28, 2012	Haleakala	Pan-STARRS 1	·	560 m	MPC · JPL
817129	2012 DR_{84}	—	September 29, 2010	Mount Lemmon	Mount Lemmon Survey	·	500 m	MPC · JPL
817130	2012 DC_{91}	—	February 1, 2012	Kitt Peak	Spacewatch	·	700 m	MPC · JPL
817131	2012 DF_{93}	—	March 26, 2008	Mount Lemmon	Mount Lemmon Survey	·	820 m	MPC · JPL
817132	2012 DS_{95}	—	February 23, 2012	Mount Lemmon	Mount Lemmon Survey	·	3.1 km	MPC · JPL
817133	2012 DT_{99}	—	February 21, 2012	Kitt Peak	Spacewatch	·	510 m	MPC · JPL
817134	2012 DW_{99}	—	November 26, 2010	Mount Lemmon	Mount Lemmon Survey	·	1.8 km	MPC · JPL
817135	2012 DD_{101}	—	February 21, 2012	Kitt Peak	Spacewatch	ADE	1.4 km	MPC · JPL
817136	2012 DN_{105}	—	February 28, 2012	Haleakala	Pan-STARRS 1	·	460 m	MPC · JPL
817137	2012 DB_{106}	—	February 23, 2012	Mount Lemmon	Mount Lemmon Survey	·	1.0 km	MPC · JPL
817138	2012 DP_{107}	—	February 20, 2012	Haleakala	Pan-STARRS 1	·	2.7 km	MPC · JPL
817139	2012 DY_{107}	—	February 24, 2012	Mount Lemmon	Mount Lemmon Survey	EOS	1.5 km	MPC · JPL
817140	2012 DD_{108}	—	February 27, 2012	Haleakala	Pan-STARRS 1	·	880 m	MPC · JPL
817141	2012 DK_{109}	—	February 24, 2012	Mount Lemmon	Mount Lemmon Survey	·	750 m	MPC · JPL
817142	2012 DR_{109}	—	February 27, 2012	Haleakala	Pan-STARRS 1	H	300 m	MPC · JPL
817143	2012 DL_{111}	—	August 13, 2010	Kitt Peak	Spacewatch	·	580 m	MPC · JPL
817144	2012 DE_{112}	—	February 28, 2012	Haleakala	Pan-STARRS 1	(2076)	580 m	MPC · JPL
817145	2012 DP_{115}	—	February 16, 2012	Haleakala	Pan-STARRS 1	·	890 m	MPC · JPL
817146	2012 DM_{117}	—	February 21, 2012	Kitt Peak	Spacewatch	NYS	780 m	MPC · JPL
817147	2012 DU_{118}	—	February 26, 2012	Mount Lemmon	Mount Lemmon Survey	·	600 m	MPC · JPL
817148	2012 DA_{125}	—	February 23, 2012	Mount Lemmon	Mount Lemmon Survey	·	430 m	MPC · JPL
817149	2012 DV_{127}	—	February 26, 2012	Kitt Peak	Spacewatch	·	1.8 km	MPC · JPL
817150	2012 DA_{128}	—	February 26, 2012	Kitt Peak	Spacewatch	·	980 m	MPC · JPL
817151	2012 DA_{131}	—	February 28, 2012	Haleakala	Pan-STARRS 1	·	890 m	MPC · JPL
817152	2012 DB_{134}	—	February 27, 2012	Haleakala	Pan-STARRS 1	·	2.4 km	MPC · JPL
817153	2012 EF_{10}	—	March 14, 2012	Haleakala	Pan-STARRS 1	H	450 m	MPC · JPL
817154	2012 EA_{14}	—	February 24, 2012	Kitt Peak	Spacewatch	·	2.3 km	MPC · JPL
817155	2012 EZ_{14}	—	March 15, 2012	Wildberg	R. Apitzsch	·	2.7 km	MPC · JPL
817156	2012 ER_{15}	—	November 3, 2003	Sacramento Peak	SDSS	H	390 m	MPC · JPL
817157	2012 EN_{20}	—	March 5, 2012	Kitt Peak	Spacewatch	·	520 m	MPC · JPL
817158	2012 EQ_{24}	—	January 18, 2015	Haleakala	Pan-STARRS 1	·	550 m	MPC · JPL
817159	2012 EQ_{26}	—	March 1, 2012	Mount Lemmon	Mount Lemmon Survey	·	770 m	MPC · JPL
817160	2012 EJ_{27}	—	March 15, 2012	Mount Lemmon	Mount Lemmon Survey	·	530 m	MPC · JPL
817161	2012 EH_{31}	—	March 15, 2012	Kitt Peak	Spacewatch	·	440 m	MPC · JPL
817162	2012 EO_{32}	—	March 15, 2012	Mount Lemmon	Mount Lemmon Survey	·	1.9 km	MPC · JPL
817163	2012 FW	—	February 26, 2012	Haleakala	Pan-STARRS 1	DOR	1.8 km	MPC · JPL
817164	2012 FX_{4}	—	March 16, 2012	Mount Lemmon	Mount Lemmon Survey	NYS	700 m	MPC · JPL
817165	2012 FC_{17}	—	March 13, 2012	Mount Lemmon	Mount Lemmon Survey	MAS	460 m	MPC · JPL
817166	2012 FG_{17}	—	November 14, 2010	Mount Lemmon	Mount Lemmon Survey	·	960 m	MPC · JPL
817167	2012 FD_{20}	—	March 16, 2012	Kitt Peak	Spacewatch	H	380 m	MPC · JPL
817168	2012 FS_{20}	—	March 13, 2012	Mount Lemmon	Mount Lemmon Survey	·	770 m	MPC · JPL
817169	2012 FN_{29}	—	October 9, 2010	Mount Lemmon	Mount Lemmon Survey	H	360 m	MPC · JPL
817170	2012 FZ_{41}	—	March 21, 2012	Catalina	CSS	·	580 m	MPC · JPL
817171	2012 FV_{42}	—	September 27, 2005	Kitt Peak	Spacewatch	H	380 m	MPC · JPL
817172	2012 FG_{44}	—	March 1, 2012	Mount Lemmon	Mount Lemmon Survey	H	330 m	MPC · JPL
817173	2012 FY_{52}	—	February 19, 2012	Kitt Peak	Spacewatch	·	2.3 km	MPC · JPL
817174	2012 FE_{53}	—	May 1, 2008	Kitt Peak	Spacewatch	·	1.4 km	MPC · JPL
817175	2012 FY_{64}	—	February 21, 2012	Kitt Peak	Spacewatch	·	480 m	MPC · JPL
817176	2012 FL_{66}	—	March 15, 2012	Mount Lemmon	Mount Lemmon Survey	EOS	1.6 km	MPC · JPL
817177	2012 FU_{67}	—	March 31, 2008	Mount Lemmon	Mount Lemmon Survey	·	650 m	MPC · JPL
817178	2012 FA_{69}	—	March 24, 2012	Kitt Peak	Spacewatch	·	840 m	MPC · JPL
817179	2012 FF_{71}	—	March 29, 2012	Haleakala	Pan-STARRS 1	H	330 m	MPC · JPL
817180	2012 FM_{71}	—	March 28, 2012	Haleakala	Pan-STARRS 1	·	2.2 km	MPC · JPL
817181	2012 FL_{82}	—	March 21, 2012	Catalina	CSS	·	2.3 km	MPC · JPL
817182	2012 FO_{89}	—	November 22, 2014	Mount Lemmon	Mount Lemmon Survey	PHO	700 m	MPC · JPL
817183	2012 FQ_{89}	—	March 27, 2012	Mount Lemmon	Mount Lemmon Survey	LIX	2.4 km	MPC · JPL
817184	2012 FV_{89}	—	July 31, 2014	Haleakala	Pan-STARRS 1	·	1.1 km	MPC · JPL
817185	2012 FS_{91}	—	August 8, 2007	Siding Spring	SSS	·	2.2 km	MPC · JPL
817186	2012 FA_{92}	—	March 29, 2012	Haleakala	Pan-STARRS 1	·	540 m	MPC · JPL
817187	2012 FH_{93}	—	July 4, 2016	Haleakala	Pan-STARRS 1	·	490 m	MPC · JPL
817188	2012 FE_{94}	—	March 30, 2012	Mount Lemmon	Mount Lemmon Survey	·	490 m	MPC · JPL
817189	2012 FM_{94}	—	October 2, 2013	Haleakala	Pan-STARRS 1	·	760 m	MPC · JPL
817190	2012 FY_{94}	—	October 11, 2017	Haleakala	Pan-STARRS 1	·	570 m	MPC · JPL
817191	2012 FE_{96}	—	October 6, 2016	Haleakala	Pan-STARRS 1	·	540 m	MPC · JPL
817192	2012 FS_{99}	—	May 22, 2004	Sacramento Peak	SDSS	H	350 m	MPC · JPL
817193	2012 FS_{100}	—	March 16, 2012	Kitt Peak	Spacewatch	ADE	1.2 km	MPC · JPL
817194	2012 FV_{100}	—	March 27, 2012	Mount Lemmon	Mount Lemmon Survey	H	360 m	MPC · JPL
817195	2012 FA_{106}	—	March 16, 2012	Piszkés-tető	K. Sárneczky, S. Kürti	·	1.1 km	MPC · JPL
817196	2012 GR	—	February 28, 2012	Haleakala	Pan-STARRS 1	H	420 m	MPC · JPL
817197	2012 GA_{2}	—	April 1, 2012	Mount Lemmon	Mount Lemmon Survey	THM	1.9 km	MPC · JPL
817198	2012 GA_{7}	—	April 12, 2012	Haleakala	Pan-STARRS 1	·	700 m	MPC · JPL
817199	2012 GK_{11}	—	February 25, 2012	Mount Lemmon	Mount Lemmon Survey	H	380 m	MPC · JPL
817200	2012 GC_{20}	—	March 10, 2002	Kitt Peak	Spacewatch	·	420 m	MPC · JPL

== 817201–817300 ==
back to top

Designation			Discovery			Properties		Ref
Permanent	Provisional	Named after	Date	Site	Discoverer(s)	Category	Diam.	Ref
817201	2012 GV_{24}	—	April 13, 2012	Haleakala	Pan-STARRS 1	NYS	890 m	MPC · JPL
817202	2012 GX_{24}	—	April 13, 2012	Haleakala	Pan-STARRS 1	·	530 m	MPC · JPL
817203	2012 GN_{26}	—	March 15, 2012	Haleakala	Pan-STARRS 1	EUP	2.6 km	MPC · JPL
817204	2012 GN_{32}	—	February 10, 2008	Kitt Peak	Spacewatch	MAS	630 m	MPC · JPL
817205	2012 GF_{35}	—	March 30, 2012	Kitt Peak	Spacewatch	ADE	1.4 km	MPC · JPL
817206	2012 GA_{39}	—	April 15, 2012	Haleakala	Pan-STARRS 1	·	540 m	MPC · JPL
817207	2012 GK_{40}	—	February 27, 2006	Catalina	CSS	·	2.8 km	MPC · JPL
817208	2012 GH_{41}	—	April 15, 2012	Haleakala	Pan-STARRS 1	·	1.1 km	MPC · JPL
817209	2012 GX_{41}	—	November 24, 2013	Haleakala	Pan-STARRS 1	·	540 m	MPC · JPL
817210	2012 GA_{43}	—	April 15, 2012	Haleakala	Pan-STARRS 1	EOS	1.5 km	MPC · JPL
817211	2012 GN_{44}	—	February 18, 2017	Haleakala	Pan-STARRS 1	H	380 m	MPC · JPL
817212	2012 GU_{44}	—	April 15, 2012	Haleakala	Pan-STARRS 1	·	510 m	MPC · JPL
817213	2012 GV_{44}	—	November 2, 2015	Haleakala	Pan-STARRS 1	·	2.5 km	MPC · JPL
817214	2012 GZ_{44}	—	October 17, 2014	Mount Lemmon	Mount Lemmon Survey	·	1.5 km	MPC · JPL
817215	2012 GG_{45}	—	November 21, 2014	Haleakala	Pan-STARRS 1	·	780 m	MPC · JPL
817216	2012 GY_{45}	—	January 23, 2015	Haleakala	Pan-STARRS 1	·	540 m	MPC · JPL
817217	2012 GB_{46}	—	March 3, 2016	Mount Lemmon	Mount Lemmon Survey	BRA	1.1 km	MPC · JPL
817218	2012 GW_{47}	—	April 15, 2012	Haleakala	Pan-STARRS 1	·	560 m	MPC · JPL
817219	2012 GW_{48}	—	April 13, 2012	Haleakala	Pan-STARRS 1	·	1.1 km	MPC · JPL
817220	2012 GE_{50}	—	April 15, 2012	Haleakala	Pan-STARRS 1	·	1.0 km	MPC · JPL
817221	2012 GH_{50}	—	February 13, 2008	Mount Lemmon	Mount Lemmon Survey	·	570 m	MPC · JPL
817222	2012 GF_{53}	—	April 1, 2012	Mount Lemmon	Mount Lemmon Survey	·	2.2 km	MPC · JPL
817223	2012 GQ_{53}	—	April 13, 2012	Haleakala	Pan-STARRS 1	·	840 m	MPC · JPL
817224	2012 HR_{11}	—	March 29, 2012	Mount Lemmon	Mount Lemmon Survey	·	990 m	MPC · JPL
817225	2012 HN_{12}	—	April 21, 2012	Mount Lemmon	Mount Lemmon Survey	(1547)	1.3 km	MPC · JPL
817226	2012 HG_{13}	—	April 18, 2012	Kitt Peak	Spacewatch	·	2.5 km	MPC · JPL
817227	2012 HF_{14}	—	April 19, 2012	Kitt Peak	Spacewatch	·	2.1 km	MPC · JPL
817228	2012 HA_{17}	—	April 21, 2012	Kitt Peak	Spacewatch	·	1.4 km	MPC · JPL
817229	2012 HA_{19}	—	April 1, 2012	Catalina	CSS	·	720 m	MPC · JPL
817230	2012 HE_{23}	—	March 27, 2012	Mount Lemmon	Mount Lemmon Survey	·	2.1 km	MPC · JPL
817231	2012 HK_{30}	—	April 20, 2012	Kitt Peak	Spacewatch	·	510 m	MPC · JPL
817232	2012 HQ_{30}	—	April 16, 2012	Kitt Peak	Spacewatch	·	920 m	MPC · JPL
817233	2012 HJ_{32}	—	April 13, 2012	Haleakala	Pan-STARRS 1	H	410 m	MPC · JPL
817234	2012 HE_{34}	—	March 23, 2012	Kitt Peak	Spacewatch	·	550 m	MPC · JPL
817235	2012 HH_{35}	—	April 27, 2012	Haleakala	Pan-STARRS 1	·	1.0 km	MPC · JPL
817236	2012 HN_{36}	—	February 12, 2004	Kitt Peak	D. E. Trilling, A. S. Rivkin	PHO	1.0 km	MPC · JPL
817237	2012 HH_{37}	—	April 15, 2012	Haleakala	Pan-STARRS 1	·	540 m	MPC · JPL
817238	2012 HG_{38}	—	February 24, 2006	Kitt Peak	Spacewatch	·	1.9 km	MPC · JPL
817239	2012 HJ_{38}	—	September 3, 2008	Kitt Peak	Spacewatch	·	1.6 km	MPC · JPL
817240	2012 HA_{50}	—	March 29, 2012	Mount Lemmon	Mount Lemmon Survey	H	350 m	MPC · JPL
817241	2012 HM_{50}	—	April 19, 2012	Kitt Peak	Spacewatch	·	510 m	MPC · JPL
817242	2012 HA_{51}	—	April 24, 2012	Haleakala	Pan-STARRS 1	H	450 m	MPC · JPL
817243	2012 HV_{53}	—	March 30, 2012	Mount Lemmon	Mount Lemmon Survey	·	790 m	MPC · JPL
817244	2012 HT_{57}	—	November 9, 2010	Mount Lemmon	Mount Lemmon Survey	H	410 m	MPC · JPL
817245	2012 HZ_{57}	—	April 17, 2012	Kitt Peak	Spacewatch	EUN	880 m	MPC · JPL
817246	2012 HE_{58}	—	April 17, 2012	Catalina	CSS	·	650 m	MPC · JPL
817247	2012 HW_{59}	—	April 19, 2012	Mount Lemmon	Mount Lemmon Survey	·	520 m	MPC · JPL
817248	2012 HC_{60}	—	March 16, 2012	Kitt Peak	Spacewatch	·	1.1 km	MPC · JPL
817249	2012 HA_{63}	—	March 28, 2012	Kitt Peak	Spacewatch	·	1.2 km	MPC · JPL
817250	2012 HX_{63}	—	April 20, 2012	Mount Lemmon	Mount Lemmon Survey	·	640 m	MPC · JPL
817251	2012 HE_{66}	—	April 21, 2012	Kitt Peak	Spacewatch	·	1.3 km	MPC · JPL
817252	2012 HJ_{70}	—	February 2, 2008	Kitt Peak	Spacewatch	NYS	940 m	MPC · JPL
817253	2012 HB_{71}	—	April 24, 2012	Mount Lemmon	Mount Lemmon Survey	·	570 m	MPC · JPL
817254	2012 HC_{74}	—	April 15, 2012	Haleakala	Pan-STARRS 1	·	490 m	MPC · JPL
817255	2012 HH_{74}	—	April 11, 2005	Mount Lemmon	Mount Lemmon Survey	·	540 m	MPC · JPL
817256	2012 HP_{76}	—	March 28, 2012	Kitt Peak	Spacewatch	·	530 m	MPC · JPL
817257	2012 HB_{77}	—	March 16, 2012	Mount Lemmon	Mount Lemmon Survey	·	490 m	MPC · JPL
817258	2012 HM_{77}	—	April 19, 2012	Kitt Peak	Spacewatch	·	1.1 km	MPC · JPL
817259	2012 HV_{80}	—	April 29, 2012	Mount Lemmon	Mount Lemmon Survey	·	2.5 km	MPC · JPL
817260	2012 HB_{83}	—	April 22, 2012	Catalina	CSS	·	3.2 km	MPC · JPL
817261	2012 HP_{84}	—	March 29, 2012	Catalina	CSS	T_{j} (2.99)	2.9 km	MPC · JPL
817262	2012 HQ_{86}	—	April 21, 2012	Mount Lemmon	Mount Lemmon Survey	·	1.3 km	MPC · JPL
817263	2012 HB_{88}	—	April 27, 2012	Haleakala	Pan-STARRS 1	·	760 m	MPC · JPL
817264	2012 HO_{88}	—	April 27, 2012	Haleakala	Pan-STARRS 1	(1547)	1.1 km	MPC · JPL
817265	2012 HW_{88}	—	April 19, 2012	Mount Lemmon	Mount Lemmon Survey	·	1.7 km	MPC · JPL
817266	2012 HC_{89}	—	April 18, 2012	Kitt Peak	Spacewatch	·	1.5 km	MPC · JPL
817267	2012 HQ_{89}	—	April 27, 2012	Mount Lemmon	Mount Lemmon Survey	·	2.1 km	MPC · JPL
817268	2012 HW_{89}	—	March 4, 2016	Haleakala	Pan-STARRS 1	·	1.1 km	MPC · JPL
817269	2012 HN_{90}	—	September 10, 2013	Haleakala	Pan-STARRS 1	·	1.0 km	MPC · JPL
817270	2012 HC_{91}	—	September 26, 2013	Mount Lemmon	Mount Lemmon Survey	·	1.4 km	MPC · JPL
817271	2012 HP_{91}	—	April 19, 2012	Mount Lemmon	Mount Lemmon Survey	·	860 m	MPC · JPL
817272	2012 HF_{92}	—	April 27, 2012	Mount Lemmon	Mount Lemmon Survey	·	900 m	MPC · JPL
817273	2012 HO_{92}	—	April 27, 2012	Haleakala	Pan-STARRS 1	·	780 m	MPC · JPL
817274	2012 HA_{93}	—	April 21, 2012	Mount Lemmon	Mount Lemmon Survey	·	2.5 km	MPC · JPL
817275	2012 HF_{93}	—	April 21, 2012	Mount Lemmon	Mount Lemmon Survey	·	2.2 km	MPC · JPL
817276	2012 HJ_{93}	—	April 25, 2012	Mount Lemmon	Mount Lemmon Survey	·	970 m	MPC · JPL
817277	2012 HX_{93}	—	April 26, 2017	Haleakala	Pan-STARRS 1	·	1.8 km	MPC · JPL
817278	2012 HJ_{94}	—	August 17, 2013	Haleakala	Pan-STARRS 1	·	2.3 km	MPC · JPL
817279	2012 HS_{94}	—	February 17, 2015	Haleakala	Pan-STARRS 1	·	440 m	MPC · JPL
817280	2012 HJ_{96}	—	April 20, 2012	Mount Lemmon	Mount Lemmon Survey	·	580 m	MPC · JPL
817281	2012 HY_{97}	—	April 20, 2012	Kitt Peak	Spacewatch	·	1.1 km	MPC · JPL
817282	2012 HD_{99}	—	April 17, 2012	Kitt Peak	Spacewatch	·	600 m	MPC · JPL
817283	2012 HG_{99}	—	April 27, 2012	Haleakala	Pan-STARRS 1	·	1.7 km	MPC · JPL
817284	2012 HJ_{99}	—	April 18, 2012	Kitt Peak	Spacewatch	·	1.3 km	MPC · JPL
817285	2012 HV_{99}	—	April 27, 2012	Haleakala	Pan-STARRS 1	·	1.1 km	MPC · JPL
817286	2012 HO_{100}	—	April 27, 2012	Haleakala	Pan-STARRS 1	·	520 m	MPC · JPL
817287	2012 HU_{100}	—	April 28, 2012	Mount Lemmon	Mount Lemmon Survey	·	1.1 km	MPC · JPL
817288	2012 HU_{101}	—	April 20, 2012	Mount Lemmon	Mount Lemmon Survey	·	2.6 km	MPC · JPL
817289	2012 HJ_{102}	—	April 30, 2012	Mount Lemmon	Mount Lemmon Survey	NYS	830 m	MPC · JPL
817290	2012 HM_{102}	—	April 20, 2012	Mount Lemmon	Mount Lemmon Survey	·	780 m	MPC · JPL
817291	2012 HS_{102}	—	April 27, 2012	Haleakala	Pan-STARRS 1	·	600 m	MPC · JPL
817292	2012 HA_{103}	—	August 27, 2009	Kitt Peak	Spacewatch	·	790 m	MPC · JPL
817293	2012 HB_{103}	—	April 27, 2012	Haleakala	Pan-STARRS 1	·	2.5 km	MPC · JPL
817294	2012 HH_{103}	—	April 27, 2012	Kitt Peak	Spacewatch	EUN	790 m	MPC · JPL
817295	2012 HC_{106}	—	April 16, 2012	Haleakala	Pan-STARRS 1	·	900 m	MPC · JPL
817296	2012 HS_{106}	—	April 27, 2012	Haleakala	Pan-STARRS 1	·	1.4 km	MPC · JPL
817297	2012 HG_{107}	—	April 27, 2012	Haleakala	Pan-STARRS 1	·	1.0 km	MPC · JPL
817298	2012 HL_{108}	—	April 27, 2012	Haleakala	Pan-STARRS 1	·	2.0 km	MPC · JPL
817299	2012 HO_{110}	—	April 21, 2012	Mount Lemmon	Mount Lemmon Survey	·	2.7 km	MPC · JPL
817300	2012 HZ_{113}	—	January 12, 2011	Mount Lemmon	Mount Lemmon Survey	EUN	900 m	MPC · JPL

== 817301–817400 ==
back to top

Designation			Discovery			Properties		Ref
Permanent	Provisional	Named after	Date	Site	Discoverer(s)	Category	Diam.	Ref
817301	2012 HZ_{117}	—	April 27, 2012	Haleakala	Pan-STARRS 1	·	830 m	MPC · JPL
817302	2012 JF	—	May 9, 2012	Haleakala	Pan-STARRS 1	H	470 m	MPC · JPL
817303	2012 JB_{2}	—	May 12, 2012	Mount Lemmon	Mount Lemmon Survey	·	670 m	MPC · JPL
817304	2012 JL_{5}	—	October 28, 2006	Kitt Peak	Spacewatch	·	290 m	MPC · JPL
817305	2012 JR_{7}	—	May 12, 2012	Mount Lemmon	Mount Lemmon Survey	·	490 m	MPC · JPL
817306	2012 JN_{11}	—	April 18, 2012	Mount Lemmon	Mount Lemmon Survey	H	410 m	MPC · JPL
817307	2012 JB_{12}	—	May 12, 2012	Kitt Peak	Spacewatch	H	510 m	MPC · JPL
817308	2012 JO_{17}	—	January 10, 2011	Mount Lemmon	Mount Lemmon Survey	·	2.6 km	MPC · JPL
817309	2012 JD_{22}	—	April 16, 2012	Catalina	CSS	BAR	1.0 km	MPC · JPL
817310	2012 JM_{23}	—	April 19, 2012	Mount Lemmon	Mount Lemmon Survey	PHO	780 m	MPC · JPL
817311	2012 JA_{31}	—	April 21, 2012	Mount Lemmon	Mount Lemmon Survey	·	1.2 km	MPC · JPL
817312	2012 JQ_{35}	—	May 15, 2012	Haleakala	Pan-STARRS 1	KON	1.8 km	MPC · JPL
817313	2012 JJ_{38}	—	May 11, 2012	Kitt Peak	Spacewatch	·	720 m	MPC · JPL
817314	2012 JR_{38}	—	May 1, 2012	Kitt Peak	Spacewatch	·	1.9 km	MPC · JPL
817315	2012 JC_{39}	—	May 12, 2012	Mount Lemmon	Mount Lemmon Survey	·	1.2 km	MPC · JPL
817316	2012 JU_{40}	—	May 12, 2012	Haleakala	Pan-STARRS 1	·	520 m	MPC · JPL
817317	2012 JT_{42}	—	April 28, 2012	Mount Lemmon	Mount Lemmon Survey	·	500 m	MPC · JPL
817318	2012 JC_{45}	—	May 15, 2012	Haleakala	Pan-STARRS 1	·	950 m	MPC · JPL
817319	2012 JJ_{47}	—	August 31, 2005	Kitt Peak	Spacewatch	PHO	610 m	MPC · JPL
817320	2012 JQ_{47}	—	May 15, 2012	Kitt Peak	Spacewatch	T_{j} (2.98)	2.5 km	MPC · JPL
817321	2012 JW_{51}	—	May 14, 2012	Haleakala	Pan-STARRS 1	·	2.5 km	MPC · JPL
817322	2012 JQ_{53}	—	May 15, 2012	Haleakala	Pan-STARRS 1	NYS	850 m	MPC · JPL
817323	2012 JS_{53}	—	April 27, 2012	Mount Lemmon	Mount Lemmon Survey	·	510 m	MPC · JPL
817324	2012 JM_{55}	—	May 12, 2012	Mount Lemmon	Mount Lemmon Survey	EUN	610 m	MPC · JPL
817325	2012 JP_{55}	—	April 30, 2012	Mount Lemmon	Mount Lemmon Survey	·	1.2 km	MPC · JPL
817326	2012 JA_{58}	—	May 12, 2012	Haleakala	Pan-STARRS 1	V	440 m	MPC · JPL
817327	2012 JS_{58}	—	April 19, 2012	Mount Lemmon	Mount Lemmon Survey	·	730 m	MPC · JPL
817328	2012 JF_{59}	—	April 27, 2012	Haleakala	Pan-STARRS 1	·	530 m	MPC · JPL
817329	2012 JO_{62}	—	May 28, 2008	Kitt Peak	Spacewatch	·	880 m	MPC · JPL
817330	2012 JF_{63}	—	May 8, 2005	Kitt Peak	Spacewatch	·	520 m	MPC · JPL
817331	2012 JY_{63}	—	April 29, 2012	Kitt Peak	Spacewatch	·	810 m	MPC · JPL
817332	2012 JZ_{63}	—	April 16, 2012	Kitt Peak	Spacewatch	·	520 m	MPC · JPL
817333	2012 JE_{64}	—	September 26, 2009	Kitt Peak	Spacewatch	MAS	610 m	MPC · JPL
817334	2012 JV_{64}	—	April 27, 2012	Kitt Peak	Spacewatch	H	380 m	MPC · JPL
817335	2012 JO_{65}	—	May 15, 2012	Haleakala	Pan-STARRS 1	·	1.0 km	MPC · JPL
817336	2012 JS_{67}	—	April 14, 2007	Mount Lemmon	Mount Lemmon Survey	·	1.4 km	MPC · JPL
817337	2012 JJ_{68}	—	May 12, 2012	Haleakala	Pan-STARRS 1	·	3.1 km	MPC · JPL
817338	2012 JB_{69}	—	August 30, 2013	Haleakala	Pan-STARRS 1	·	2.2 km	MPC · JPL
817339	2012 JD_{69}	—	April 27, 2017	Haleakala	Pan-STARRS 1	H	470 m	MPC · JPL
817340	2012 JV_{69}	—	April 14, 2015	Mount Lemmon	Mount Lemmon Survey	·	550 m	MPC · JPL
817341	2012 JL_{70}	—	May 13, 2012	Mount Lemmon	Mount Lemmon Survey	·	640 m	MPC · JPL
817342	2012 JZ_{70}	—	May 1, 2012	Mount Lemmon	Mount Lemmon Survey	ADE	1.3 km	MPC · JPL
817343	2012 JG_{71}	—	May 1, 2012	Mount Lemmon	Mount Lemmon Survey	T_{j} (2.98)	2.4 km	MPC · JPL
817344	2012 JB_{72}	—	May 1, 2012	Mount Lemmon	Mount Lemmon Survey	·	1.2 km	MPC · JPL
817345	2012 JC_{72}	—	May 15, 2012	Mount Lemmon	Mount Lemmon Survey	·	1.1 km	MPC · JPL
817346	2012 KC_{5}	—	December 31, 2008	Kitt Peak	Spacewatch	H	360 m	MPC · JPL
817347	2012 KH_{5}	—	May 16, 2012	Mount Lemmon	Mount Lemmon Survey	·	480 m	MPC · JPL
817348	2012 KD_{7}	—	May 19, 2012	Haleakala	Pan-STARRS 1	·	430 m	MPC · JPL
817349	2012 KG_{9}	—	October 31, 2010	Kitt Peak	Spacewatch	H	400 m	MPC · JPL
817350	2012 KK_{12}	—	May 13, 2012	Kitt Peak	Spacewatch	·	1.4 km	MPC · JPL
817351	2012 KQ_{12}	—	January 14, 2011	Mount Lemmon	Mount Lemmon Survey	·	560 m	MPC · JPL
817352	2012 KZ_{12}	—	October 13, 2010	Mount Lemmon	Mount Lemmon Survey	H	350 m	MPC · JPL
817353	2012 KQ_{18}	—	May 16, 2012	Haleakala	Pan-STARRS 1	·	1.2 km	MPC · JPL
817354	2012 KM_{22}	—	March 27, 2012	Kitt Peak	Spacewatch	(1547)	1.1 km	MPC · JPL
817355	2012 KL_{23}	—	May 19, 2012	Haleakala	Pan-STARRS 1	H	370 m	MPC · JPL
817356	2012 KB_{25}	—	May 1, 2012	Mount Lemmon	Mount Lemmon Survey	·	710 m	MPC · JPL
817357	2012 KV_{28}	—	May 17, 2012	Mount Lemmon	Mount Lemmon Survey	CLA	1.3 km	MPC · JPL
817358	2012 KX_{30}	—	March 25, 2012	Kitt Peak	Spacewatch	·	990 m	MPC · JPL
817359	2012 KD_{32}	—	September 29, 2009	Mount Lemmon	Mount Lemmon Survey	·	1.2 km	MPC · JPL
817360	2012 KK_{32}	—	April 20, 2012	Kitt Peak	Spacewatch	·	440 m	MPC · JPL
817361	2012 KU_{34}	—	April 21, 2012	Mount Lemmon	Mount Lemmon Survey	·	1.3 km	MPC · JPL
817362	2012 KJ_{40}	—	May 14, 2012	Mount Lemmon	Mount Lemmon Survey	·	960 m	MPC · JPL
817363	2012 KM_{41}	—	May 20, 2012	Mount Lemmon	Mount Lemmon Survey	·	1.1 km	MPC · JPL
817364	2012 KP_{41}	—	May 20, 2012	Mount Lemmon	Mount Lemmon Survey	·	2.6 km	MPC · JPL
817365	2012 KC_{42}	—	May 1, 2012	Mount Lemmon	Mount Lemmon Survey	·	500 m	MPC · JPL
817366	2012 KE_{43}	—	April 15, 2012	Haleakala	Pan-STARRS 1	H	430 m	MPC · JPL
817367	2012 KZ_{43}	—	April 21, 2012	Mount Lemmon	Mount Lemmon Survey	NYS	760 m	MPC · JPL
817368	2012 KF_{47}	—	May 31, 2012	Mount Lemmon	Mount Lemmon Survey	APO	220 m	MPC · JPL
817369	2012 KX_{51}	—	October 14, 2010	Mount Lemmon	Mount Lemmon Survey	H	440 m	MPC · JPL
817370	2012 KQ_{52}	—	May 14, 2012	Mount Lemmon	Mount Lemmon Survey	·	1.1 km	MPC · JPL
817371	2012 KZ_{53}	—	May 20, 2012	Mount Lemmon	Mount Lemmon Survey	·	1.2 km	MPC · JPL
817372	2012 KC_{54}	—	May 30, 2008	Mount Lemmon	Mount Lemmon Survey	·	1.2 km	MPC · JPL
817373	2012 KV_{54}	—	May 27, 2012	Mount Lemmon	Mount Lemmon Survey	·	1.0 km	MPC · JPL
817374	2012 KY_{54}	—	October 9, 2013	Mount Lemmon	Mount Lemmon Survey	·	880 m	MPC · JPL
817375	2012 KB_{55}	—	April 11, 2016	Haleakala	Pan-STARRS 1	·	1.2 km	MPC · JPL
817376	2012 KF_{55}	—	May 21, 2012	Haleakala	Pan-STARRS 1	·	550 m	MPC · JPL
817377	2012 KT_{55}	—	May 20, 2012	Mount Lemmon	Mount Lemmon Survey	·	960 m	MPC · JPL
817378	2012 KG_{57}	—	August 6, 2016	Haleakala	Pan-STARRS 1	PHO	650 m	MPC · JPL
817379	2012 KE_{58}	—	March 21, 2017	Haleakala	Pan-STARRS 1	·	2.1 km	MPC · JPL
817380	2012 KH_{58}	—	May 27, 2012	Mount Lemmon	Mount Lemmon Survey	·	530 m	MPC · JPL
817381	2012 KG_{60}	—	May 21, 2012	Haleakala	Pan-STARRS 1	·	2.2 km	MPC · JPL
817382	2012 KV_{61}	—	May 27, 2012	Mount Lemmon	Mount Lemmon Survey	NYS	880 m	MPC · JPL
817383	2012 KZ_{62}	—	May 29, 2012	Mount Lemmon	Mount Lemmon Survey	V	600 m	MPC · JPL
817384	2012 KL_{63}	—	May 16, 2012	Mount Lemmon	Mount Lemmon Survey	·	1.0 km	MPC · JPL
817385	2012 KX_{63}	—	May 21, 2012	Haleakala	Pan-STARRS 1	·	1.2 km	MPC · JPL
817386	2012 KF_{66}	—	May 19, 2012	Mount Lemmon	Mount Lemmon Survey	HNS	760 m	MPC · JPL
817387	2012 KN_{66}	—	November 3, 2010	Mayhill-ISON	L. Elenin	H	380 m	MPC · JPL
817388	2012 LC	—	December 2, 2010	Mount Lemmon	Mount Lemmon Survey	H	440 m	MPC · JPL
817389	2012 LM_{1}	—	January 28, 2011	Mount Lemmon	Mount Lemmon Survey	TIR	2.4 km	MPC · JPL
817390	2012 LO_{4}	—	June 9, 2012	Mount Lemmon	Mount Lemmon Survey	·	680 m	MPC · JPL
817391	2012 LS_{5}	—	June 13, 2012	Haleakala	Pan-STARRS 1	H	430 m	MPC · JPL
817392	2012 LB_{16}	—	March 6, 2008	Mount Lemmon	Mount Lemmon Survey	·	1.0 km	MPC · JPL
817393	2012 LJ_{17}	—	June 12, 2012	Mount Lemmon	Mount Lemmon Survey	·	540 m	MPC · JPL
817394	2012 LB_{20}	—	June 9, 2012	Mount Lemmon	Mount Lemmon Survey	·	2.0 km	MPC · JPL
817395	2012 LZ_{27}	—	April 10, 2016	Haleakala	Pan-STARRS 1	EUN	960 m	MPC · JPL
817396	2012 LN_{28}	—	June 1, 2012	Mount Lemmon	Mount Lemmon Survey	·	1.3 km	MPC · JPL
817397	2012 LP_{28}	—	June 1, 2012	Mount Lemmon	Mount Lemmon Survey	·	2.4 km	MPC · JPL
817398	2012 LQ_{28}	—	June 1, 2012	Mount Lemmon	Mount Lemmon Survey	·	1.3 km	MPC · JPL
817399	2012 LS_{28}	—	June 13, 2012	Kitt Peak	Spacewatch	·	520 m	MPC · JPL
817400	2012 LU_{28}	—	June 12, 2012	Catalina	CSS	·	1.1 km	MPC · JPL

== 817401–817500 ==
back to top

Designation			Discovery			Properties		Ref
Permanent	Provisional	Named after	Date	Site	Discoverer(s)	Category	Diam.	Ref
817401	2012 LW_{28}	—	June 9, 2012	Mount Lemmon	Mount Lemmon Survey	·	1.0 km	MPC · JPL
817402	2012 LX_{28}	—	June 15, 2012	Haleakala	Pan-STARRS 1	·	900 m	MPC · JPL
817403	2012 LY_{28}	—	June 15, 2012	Haleakala	Pan-STARRS 1	·	990 m	MPC · JPL
817404	2012 LZ_{28}	—	January 20, 2013	Mount Lemmon	Mount Lemmon Survey	·	1.1 km	MPC · JPL
817405	2012 LJ_{29}	—	August 10, 2016	Haleakala	Pan-STARRS 1	·	640 m	MPC · JPL
817406	2012 LS_{30}	—	April 11, 2016	Haleakala	Pan-STARRS 1	·	1.3 km	MPC · JPL
817407	2012 LC_{31}	—	November 10, 2013	Kitt Peak	Spacewatch	NEM	1.7 km	MPC · JPL
817408	2012 LK_{31}	—	June 9, 2012	Mount Lemmon	Mount Lemmon Survey	EUN	810 m	MPC · JPL
817409	2012 ML	—	June 16, 2012	Mount Lemmon	Mount Lemmon Survey	H	450 m	MPC · JPL
817410	2012 MR_{1}	—	November 8, 2009	Mount Lemmon	Mount Lemmon Survey	·	500 m	MPC · JPL
817411	2012 MA_{3}	—	June 11, 2012	Haleakala	Pan-STARRS 1	H	380 m	MPC · JPL
817412	2012 MC_{4}	—	May 16, 2012	Haleakala	Pan-STARRS 1	·	1.4 km	MPC · JPL
817413	2012 MX_{6}	—	June 23, 2012	Pla D'Arguines	R. Ferrando, Ferrando, M.	·	1.1 km	MPC · JPL
817414	2012 MN_{8}	—	June 16, 2012	Haleakala	Pan-STARRS 1	JUN	930 m	MPC · JPL
817415	2012 MN_{12}	—	June 17, 2012	Mount Lemmon	Mount Lemmon Survey	·	1.6 km	MPC · JPL
817416	2012 MA_{14}	—	June 16, 2012	Haleakala	Pan-STARRS 1	AEO	1.0 km	MPC · JPL
817417	2012 MJ_{17}	—	June 23, 2012	Mount Lemmon	Mount Lemmon Survey	·	640 m	MPC · JPL
817418	2012 MK_{17}	—	May 15, 2016	Haleakala	Pan-STARRS 1	EUN	1.0 km	MPC · JPL
817419	2012 MH_{18}	—	March 22, 2015	Haleakala	Pan-STARRS 1	(2076)	500 m	MPC · JPL
817420	2012 NF	—	November 21, 2008	Sandlot	G. Hug	·	1.4 km	MPC · JPL
817421	2012 OV_{4}	—	July 29, 2012	Haleakala	Pan-STARRS 1	H	460 m	MPC · JPL
817422	2012 ON_{7}	—	July 28, 2012	Haleakala	Pan-STARRS 1	·	1.2 km	MPC · JPL
817423	2012 OP_{7}	—	July 21, 2012	Zelenchukskaya	T. V. Krjačko, B. Satovski	EUN	850 m	MPC · JPL
817424	2012 PN_{1}	—	August 8, 2012	Haleakala	Pan-STARRS 1	V	430 m	MPC · JPL
817425	2012 PK_{5}	—	February 24, 2008	Mount Lemmon	Mount Lemmon Survey	·	780 m	MPC · JPL
817426	2012 PP_{5}	—	August 6, 2012	Haleakala	Pan-STARRS 1	·	740 m	MPC · JPL
817427	2012 PX_{9}	—	August 8, 2012	Haleakala	Pan-STARRS 1	·	470 m	MPC · JPL
817428	2012 PW_{11}	—	July 29, 2005	Palomar	NEAT	·	570 m	MPC · JPL
817429	2012 PR_{12}	—	August 10, 2012	Kitt Peak	Spacewatch	·	450 m	MPC · JPL
817430	2012 PA_{13}	—	September 6, 1999	Kitt Peak	Spacewatch	JUN	680 m	MPC · JPL
817431	2012 PR_{16}	—	August 12, 2012	Haleakala	Pan-STARRS 1	·	1.4 km	MPC · JPL
817432	2012 PQ_{17}	—	May 22, 2012	Mount Lemmon	Mount Lemmon Survey	·	1.1 km	MPC · JPL
817433	2012 PT_{18}	—	August 11, 2012	Haleakala	Pan-STARRS 1	H	490 m	MPC · JPL
817434	2012 PY_{18}	—	August 12, 2012	Haleakala	Pan-STARRS 1	H	480 m	MPC · JPL
817435	2012 PS_{22}	—	August 13, 2012	Haleakala	Pan-STARRS 1	·	1.2 km	MPC · JPL
817436	2012 PU_{22}	—	August 13, 2012	Haleakala	Pan-STARRS 1	·	550 m	MPC · JPL
817437	2012 PP_{25}	—	August 14, 2012	Dauban	C. Rinner	·	1.3 km	MPC · JPL
817438	2012 PR_{25}	—	September 18, 2003	Kitt Peak	Spacewatch	EUN	1.1 km	MPC · JPL
817439	2012 PP_{26}	—	August 11, 2012	Siding Spring	SSS	·	2.7 km	MPC · JPL
817440	2012 PE_{27}	—	May 29, 2012	Mount Lemmon	Mount Lemmon Survey	TIR	2.1 km	MPC · JPL
817441	2012 PK_{27}	—	August 13, 2012	Haleakala	Pan-STARRS 1	·	450 m	MPC · JPL
817442	2012 PG_{34}	—	August 8, 2012	Haleakala	Pan-STARRS 1	PHO	1.2 km	MPC · JPL
817443	2012 PK_{38}	—	February 5, 2011	Haleakala	Pan-STARRS 1	·	560 m	MPC · JPL
817444	2012 PT_{39}	—	August 10, 2012	Haleakala	Pan-STARRS 1	PHO	800 m	MPC · JPL
817445	2012 PH_{41}	—	August 13, 2012	Haleakala	Pan-STARRS 1	H	370 m	MPC · JPL
817446	2012 PR_{41}	—	August 10, 2012	Kitt Peak	Spacewatch	V	440 m	MPC · JPL
817447	2012 PJ_{45}	—	August 14, 2012	Haleakala	Pan-STARRS 1	DOR	1.7 km	MPC · JPL
817448	2012 PK_{46}	—	August 13, 2012	Haleakala	Pan-STARRS 1	·	1.6 km	MPC · JPL
817449	2012 PR_{46}	—	August 14, 2012	Haleakala	Pan-STARRS 1	·	1.5 km	MPC · JPL
817450	2012 PU_{46}	—	February 10, 2016	Haleakala	Pan-STARRS 1	·	2.6 km	MPC · JPL
817451	2012 PC_{47}	—	August 13, 2012	Haleakala	Pan-STARRS 1	·	530 m	MPC · JPL
817452	2012 PT_{47}	—	August 10, 2012	Kitt Peak	Spacewatch	·	1.1 km	MPC · JPL
817453	2012 PW_{49}	—	December 1, 2016	Mount Lemmon	Mount Lemmon Survey	·	740 m	MPC · JPL
817454	2012 PA_{51}	—	June 22, 2015	Haleakala	Pan-STARRS 1	H	460 m	MPC · JPL
817455	2012 PM_{52}	—	August 6, 2012	Haleakala	Pan-STARRS 1	·	830 m	MPC · JPL
817456	2012 PJ_{53}	—	April 30, 2016	Haleakala	Pan-STARRS 1	·	1.7 km	MPC · JPL
817457	2012 PB_{56}	—	August 13, 2012	Haleakala	Pan-STARRS 1	·	860 m	MPC · JPL
817458	2012 PC_{56}	—	August 12, 2012	Kitt Peak	Spacewatch	·	620 m	MPC · JPL
817459	2012 PJ_{56}	—	August 13, 2012	Haleakala	Pan-STARRS 1	·	1.0 km	MPC · JPL
817460	2012 PY_{58}	—	August 13, 2012	Haleakala	Pan-STARRS 1	·	1.2 km	MPC · JPL
817461	2012 PV_{60}	—	August 13, 2012	Haleakala	Pan-STARRS 1	·	780 m	MPC · JPL
817462	2012 PA_{63}	—	August 12, 2012	Kitt Peak	Spacewatch	L5	6.7 km	MPC · JPL
817463	2012 QT_{2}	—	August 17, 2012	Haleakala	Pan-STARRS 1	H	410 m	MPC · JPL
817464	2012 QZ_{3}	—	August 16, 2012	ESA OGS	ESA OGS	·	540 m	MPC · JPL
817465	2012 QD_{4}	—	August 16, 2012	ESA OGS	ESA OGS	GEF	910 m	MPC · JPL
817466	2012 QQ_{5}	—	August 17, 2012	Haleakala	Pan-STARRS 1	MAS	580 m	MPC · JPL
817467	2012 QR_{6}	—	August 17, 2012	Haleakala	Pan-STARRS 1	NYS	780 m	MPC · JPL
817468	2012 QW_{8}	—	October 8, 2008	Kitt Peak	Spacewatch	·	1.1 km	MPC · JPL
817469	2012 QB_{13}	—	August 21, 2012	Les Engarouines	L. Bernasconi	·	830 m	MPC · JPL
817470	2012 QZ_{26}	—	August 24, 2012	Kitt Peak	Spacewatch	·	1.4 km	MPC · JPL
817471	2012 QN_{32}	—	August 13, 2012	Kitt Peak	Spacewatch	·	550 m	MPC · JPL
817472	2012 QY_{32}	—	August 25, 2012	Kitt Peak	Spacewatch	HNS	770 m	MPC · JPL
817473	2012 QW_{36}	—	August 25, 2012	Haleakala	Pan-STARRS 1	·	920 m	MPC · JPL
817474	2012 QA_{38}	—	August 25, 2012	Haleakala	Pan-STARRS 1	·	1.0 km	MPC · JPL
817475	2012 QG_{38}	—	October 2, 2003	Kitt Peak	Spacewatch	·	1.6 km	MPC · JPL
817476	2012 QG_{41}	—	August 14, 2012	Siding Spring	SSS	·	1.4 km	MPC · JPL
817477	2012 QQ_{42}	—	August 16, 2012	ESA OGS	ESA OGS	·	770 m	MPC · JPL
817478	2012 QJ_{43}	—	August 17, 2012	ESA OGS	ESA OGS	·	2.5 km	MPC · JPL
817479	2012 QK_{49}	—	August 13, 2012	Haleakala	Pan-STARRS 1	·	1.3 km	MPC · JPL
817480	2012 QS_{49}	—	August 25, 2012	Alder Springs	K. Levin, N. Teamo	·	610 m	MPC · JPL
817481	2012 QB_{50}	—	August 28, 2012	Alder Springs	K. Levin, N. Teamo	·	710 m	MPC · JPL
817482	2012 QV_{51}	—	August 25, 2012	Mount Lemmon	Mount Lemmon Survey	·	2.2 km	MPC · JPL
817483	2012 QR_{53}	—	August 13, 2012	Kitt Peak	Spacewatch	V	480 m	MPC · JPL
817484	2012 QF_{55}	—	January 16, 2015	Haleakala	Pan-STARRS 1	·	1.5 km	MPC · JPL
817485	2012 QB_{56}	—	August 26, 2012	Haleakala	Pan-STARRS 1	EUN	1.2 km	MPC · JPL
817486	2012 QC_{56}	—	August 17, 2012	Haleakala	Pan-STARRS 1	·	940 m	MPC · JPL
817487	2012 QG_{56}	—	August 26, 2012	Haleakala	Pan-STARRS 1	·	1.5 km	MPC · JPL
817488	2012 QR_{56}	—	August 17, 2012	ESA OGS	ESA OGS	HOF	1.6 km	MPC · JPL
817489	2012 QA_{57}	—	August 17, 2012	Haleakala	Pan-STARRS 1	·	1.3 km	MPC · JPL
817490	2012 QO_{58}	—	August 25, 2012	Mount Lemmon	Mount Lemmon Survey	H	320 m	MPC · JPL
817491	2012 QE_{59}	—	August 25, 2012	Kitt Peak	Spacewatch	·	490 m	MPC · JPL
817492	2012 QD_{61}	—	March 3, 1997	Kitt Peak	Spacewatch	·	560 m	MPC · JPL
817493	2012 QV_{61}	—	August 26, 2012	Haleakala	Pan-STARRS 1	·	780 m	MPC · JPL
817494	2012 QJ_{65}	—	August 25, 2012	Catalina	CSS	·	1.1 km	MPC · JPL
817495	2012 QP_{65}	—	August 26, 2012	Haleakala	Pan-STARRS 1	H	340 m	MPC · JPL
817496	2012 QY_{67}	—	August 17, 2012	ESA OGS	ESA OGS	·	660 m	MPC · JPL
817497	2012 QD_{68}	—	August 17, 2012	Haleakala	Pan-STARRS 1	·	770 m	MPC · JPL
817498	2012 QH_{68}	—	August 26, 2012	Haleakala	Pan-STARRS 1	·	1.4 km	MPC · JPL
817499	2012 QJ_{68}	—	August 24, 2012	Kitt Peak	Spacewatch	·	1.2 km	MPC · JPL
817500	2012 QZ_{69}	—	August 26, 2012	Haleakala	Pan-STARRS 1	·	1.2 km	MPC · JPL

== 817501–817600 ==
back to top

Designation			Discovery			Properties		Ref
Permanent	Provisional	Named after	Date	Site	Discoverer(s)	Category	Diam.	Ref
817501	2012 QH_{70}	—	August 26, 2012	Haleakala	Pan-STARRS 1	L5	6.8 km	MPC · JPL
817502	2012 QT_{70}	—	August 25, 2012	Kitt Peak	Spacewatch	·	1.2 km	MPC · JPL
817503	2012 QF_{71}	—	August 26, 2012	Haleakala	Pan-STARRS 1	·	1.4 km	MPC · JPL
817504	2012 QN_{71}	—	August 26, 2012	Haleakala	Pan-STARRS 1	·	1.1 km	MPC · JPL
817505	2012 QJ_{72}	—	August 26, 2012	Haleakala	Pan-STARRS 1	·	1.3 km	MPC · JPL
817506	2012 QF_{73}	—	August 25, 2012	Mount Lemmon	Mount Lemmon Survey	·	1.0 km	MPC · JPL
817507	2012 QE_{78}	—	August 22, 2012	Haleakala	Pan-STARRS 1	·	1.3 km	MPC · JPL
817508	2012 QD_{79}	—	August 20, 2012	Westfield	International Astronomical Search Collaboration	·	890 m	MPC · JPL
817509	2012 RE_{1}	—	September 20, 2001	Socorro	LINEAR	NYS	960 m	MPC · JPL
817510	2012 RD_{2}	—	September 8, 2012	Črni Vrh	Mikuž, H.	·	1.3 km	MPC · JPL
817511	2012 RO_{3}	—	September 8, 2012	La Sagra	OAM	·	1.9 km	MPC · JPL
817512	2012 RQ_{3}	—	August 10, 2012	Les Engarouines	L. Bernasconi	·	1.2 km	MPC · JPL
817513	2012 RK_{4}	—	July 25, 2003	Socorro	LINEAR	·	1.2 km	MPC · JPL
817514	2012 RQ_{7}	—	October 26, 2008	Catalina	CSS	·	1.1 km	MPC · JPL
817515	2012 RO_{9}	—	March 11, 2003	Palomar	NEAT	·	730 m	MPC · JPL
817516	2012 RA_{10}	—	August 25, 2012	Catalina	CSS	·	920 m	MPC · JPL
817517	2012 RF_{20}	—	May 29, 2012	Mount Lemmon	Mount Lemmon Survey	·	1.4 km	MPC · JPL
817518	2012 RT_{25}	—	September 14, 2012	Mount Lemmon	Mount Lemmon Survey	EUN	1.1 km	MPC · JPL
817519	2012 RG_{29}	—	September 12, 2007	Catalina	CSS	·	1.6 km	MPC · JPL
817520	2012 RT_{30}	—	September 15, 2012	Catalina	CSS	·	860 m	MPC · JPL
817521	2012 RX_{31}	—	September 15, 2012	Catalina	CSS	·	510 m	MPC · JPL
817522	2012 RS_{32}	—	August 25, 2012	Haleakala	Pan-STARRS 1	·	1.4 km	MPC · JPL
817523	2012 RD_{33}	—	January 27, 2007	Kitt Peak	Spacewatch	·	520 m	MPC · JPL
817524	2012 RA_{35}	—	September 12, 2002	Palomar	NEAT	·	560 m	MPC · JPL
817525	2012 RH_{35}	—	August 17, 2012	Les Engarouines	L. Bernasconi	NYS	1.0 km	MPC · JPL
817526	2012 RG_{41}	—	May 28, 2008	Kitt Peak	Spacewatch	·	880 m	MPC · JPL
817527	2012 RZ_{41}	—	August 25, 2012	Haleakala	Pan-STARRS 1	·	950 m	MPC · JPL
817528	2012 RH_{45}	—	September 12, 2012	Siding Spring	SSS	MAS	550 m	MPC · JPL
817529	2012 RJ_{46}	—	September 15, 2012	Catalina	CSS	V	460 m	MPC · JPL
817530	2012 RX_{49}	—	September 12, 2012	Westfield	International Astronomical Search Collaboration	·	2.3 km	MPC · JPL
817531	2012 SU_{1}	—	September 28, 1998	Kitt Peak	Spacewatch	·	750 m	MPC · JPL
817532	2012 SY_{3}	—	September 17, 2012	Kitt Peak	Spacewatch	·	1.0 km	MPC · JPL
817533	2012 SB_{5}	—	September 17, 2012	Mount Lemmon	Mount Lemmon Survey	·	1.2 km	MPC · JPL
817534	2012 ST_{5}	—	September 17, 2012	Mount Lemmon	Mount Lemmon Survey	·	520 m	MPC · JPL
817535	2012 SA_{16}	—	September 17, 2012	Kitt Peak	Spacewatch	V	470 m	MPC · JPL
817536	2012 SH_{17}	—	August 30, 2002	Palomar	NEAT	·	510 m	MPC · JPL
817537	2012 SR_{19}	—	August 26, 2012	Haleakala	Pan-STARRS 1	·	1.9 km	MPC · JPL
817538	2012 SN_{22}	—	September 16, 2012	Catalina	CSS	·	900 m	MPC · JPL
817539	2012 SU_{22}	—	September 16, 2012	Catalina	CSS	·	2.5 km	MPC · JPL
817540	2012 SA_{26}	—	September 17, 2012	Mount Lemmon	Mount Lemmon Survey	HOF	1.8 km	MPC · JPL
817541	2012 SA_{27}	—	July 30, 2008	Mount Lemmon	Mount Lemmon Survey	·	960 m	MPC · JPL
817542	2012 SN_{29}	—	August 10, 2012	Kitt Peak	Spacewatch	·	570 m	MPC · JPL
817543	2012 SS_{33}	—	August 13, 2012	Kitt Peak	Spacewatch	·	1.0 km	MPC · JPL
817544	2012 ST_{33}	—	August 10, 2012	Kitt Peak	Spacewatch	·	470 m	MPC · JPL
817545	2012 SG_{35}	—	September 18, 2012	Mount Lemmon	Mount Lemmon Survey	·	1.5 km	MPC · JPL
817546	2012 SG_{45}	—	September 21, 2012	Mayhill-ISON	L. Elenin	·	1.6 km	MPC · JPL
817547	2012 SA_{49}	—	September 23, 2012	Mount Lemmon	Mount Lemmon Survey	·	840 m	MPC · JPL
817548	2012 SS_{50}	—	September 24, 2012	Mount Lemmon	Mount Lemmon Survey	·	1.4 km	MPC · JPL
817549	2012 SY_{50}	—	September 23, 2012	Westfield	International Astronomical Search Collaboration	(5)	1.0 km	MPC · JPL
817550	2012 SY_{51}	—	September 19, 2012	Mount Lemmon	Mount Lemmon Survey	H	380 m	MPC · JPL
817551	2012 ST_{52}	—	August 26, 2012	Kitt Peak	Spacewatch	PHO	660 m	MPC · JPL
817552	2012 SA_{53}	—	November 9, 1999	Kitt Peak	Spacewatch	·	470 m	MPC · JPL
817553	2012 SZ_{55}	—	September 14, 2012	Catalina	CSS	·	1.3 km	MPC · JPL
817554	2012 SG_{57}	—	September 14, 2012	Catalina	CSS	·	980 m	MPC · JPL
817555	2012 SR_{59}	—	October 10, 1999	Kitt Peak	Spacewatch	ADE	1.5 km	MPC · JPL
817556	2012 SB_{61}	—	August 15, 2012	Westfield	International Astronomical Search Collaboration	·	1 km	MPC · JPL
817557	2012 ST_{61}	—	August 13, 2012	Kitt Peak	Spacewatch	EUN	940 m	MPC · JPL
817558	2012 SN_{62}	—	August 25, 2012	Haleakala	Pan-STARRS 1	·	890 m	MPC · JPL
817559	2012 SV_{63}	—	October 18, 2001	Palomar	NEAT	NYS	740 m	MPC · JPL
817560	2012 SJ_{69}	—	September 24, 2012	Kitt Peak	Spacewatch	·	1.2 km	MPC · JPL
817561	2012 SB_{71}	—	September 22, 2012	Kitt Peak	Spacewatch	PHO	690 m	MPC · JPL
817562	2012 SZ_{71}	—	September 19, 1998	Kitt Peak	Spacewatch	·	610 m	MPC · JPL
817563	2012 SK_{72}	—	September 16, 2012	Kitt Peak	Spacewatch	·	1.0 km	MPC · JPL
817564	2012 ST_{73}	—	September 18, 2012	Mount Lemmon	Mount Lemmon Survey	H	490 m	MPC · JPL
817565	2012 SE_{74}	—	September 26, 2012	Haleakala	Pan-STARRS 1	H	470 m	MPC · JPL
817566	2012 SK_{74}	—	September 19, 2012	Mount Lemmon	Mount Lemmon Survey	·	450 m	MPC · JPL
817567	2012 SB_{75}	—	September 16, 2012	Mount Lemmon	Mount Lemmon Survey	·	980 m	MPC · JPL
817568	2012 SZ_{75}	—	September 21, 2012	Mount Lemmon	Mount Lemmon Survey	·	930 m	MPC · JPL
817569	2012 SJ_{76}	—	October 23, 2003	Kitt Peak	Spacewatch	MRX	750 m	MPC · JPL
817570	2012 SR_{79}	—	September 21, 2012	Mount Lemmon	Mount Lemmon Survey	·	500 m	MPC · JPL
817571	2012 SA_{80}	—	June 16, 2015	Haleakala	Pan-STARRS 1	·	550 m	MPC · JPL
817572	2012 SM_{82}	—	October 15, 2001	Palomar	NEAT	·	1.9 km	MPC · JPL
817573	2012 SN_{83}	—	September 21, 2012	Mount Lemmon	Mount Lemmon Survey	V	510 m	MPC · JPL
817574	2012 SJ_{86}	—	September 25, 2012	Mount Lemmon	Mount Lemmon Survey	·	470 m	MPC · JPL
817575	2012 SQ_{87}	—	September 24, 2012	Mount Lemmon	Mount Lemmon Survey	·	1.4 km	MPC · JPL
817576	2012 SY_{87}	—	September 25, 2012	Mount Lemmon	Mount Lemmon Survey	·	1 km	MPC · JPL
817577	2012 SQ_{88}	—	September 16, 2012	Mount Lemmon	Mount Lemmon Survey	·	2.4 km	MPC · JPL
817578	2012 SD_{89}	—	September 18, 2012	Mount Lemmon	Mount Lemmon Survey	·	920 m	MPC · JPL
817579	2012 SF_{89}	—	March 20, 2018	Mount Lemmon	Mount Lemmon Survey	·	520 m	MPC · JPL
817580	2012 SO_{91}	—	September 16, 2012	Catalina	CSS	·	1.7 km	MPC · JPL
817581	2012 SF_{92}	—	September 21, 2012	Kitt Peak	Spacewatch	·	480 m	MPC · JPL
817582	2012 SP_{92}	—	September 25, 2012	Catalina	CSS	·	530 m	MPC · JPL
817583	2012 ST_{92}	—	September 22, 2012	Kitt Peak	Spacewatch	·	1.9 km	MPC · JPL
817584	2012 SR_{93}	—	September 24, 2012	Kitt Peak	Spacewatch	·	960 m	MPC · JPL
817585	2012 SA_{94}	—	September 11, 2012	Mayhill-ISON	L. Elenin	·	1.2 km	MPC · JPL
817586	2012 SV_{96}	—	September 16, 2012	Nogales	M. Schwartz, P. R. Holvorcem	·	1.5 km	MPC · JPL
817587	2012 SS_{100}	—	September 24, 2012	Mount Lemmon	Mount Lemmon Survey	·	410 m	MPC · JPL
817588	2012 SN_{101}	—	September 21, 2012	Mount Lemmon	Mount Lemmon Survey	AGN	860 m	MPC · JPL
817589	2012 SU_{101}	—	September 21, 2012	Kitt Peak	Spacewatch	·	730 m	MPC · JPL
817590	2012 TF_{1}	—	September 14, 2012	Catalina	CSS	·	1.4 km	MPC · JPL
817591	2012 TP_{1}	—	September 22, 2012	Kitt Peak	Spacewatch	·	570 m	MPC · JPL
817592	2012 TF_{4}	—	January 24, 2011	Mount Lemmon	Mount Lemmon Survey	H	410 m	MPC · JPL
817593	2012 TN_{10}	—	September 16, 2012	Mount Lemmon	Mount Lemmon Survey	·	530 m	MPC · JPL
817594	2012 TS_{14}	—	July 21, 2006	Mount Lemmon	Mount Lemmon Survey	·	1.1 km	MPC · JPL
817595	2012 TA_{18}	—	October 6, 2012	Mount Lemmon	Mount Lemmon Survey	·	830 m	MPC · JPL
817596	2012 TK_{18}	—	October 6, 2012	Mount Lemmon	Mount Lemmon Survey	MAS	520 m	MPC · JPL
817597	2012 TZ_{18}	—	October 6, 2012	Haleakala	Pan-STARRS 1	·	540 m	MPC · JPL
817598	2012 TV_{25}	—	September 18, 2012	Nogales	M. Schwartz, P. R. Holvorcem	H	370 m	MPC · JPL
817599	2012 TN_{28}	—	October 4, 2012	Mount Lemmon	Mount Lemmon Survey	·	1.3 km	MPC · JPL
817600	2012 TM_{29}	—	August 5, 2005	Palomar	NEAT	·	450 m	MPC · JPL

== 817601–817700 ==
back to top

Designation			Discovery			Properties		Ref
Permanent	Provisional	Named after	Date	Site	Discoverer(s)	Category	Diam.	Ref
817601	2012 TU_{29}	—	September 23, 2012	Westfield	International Astronomical Search Collaboration	·	760 m	MPC · JPL
817602	2012 TZ_{36}	—	October 24, 2008	Mount Lemmon	Mount Lemmon Survey	·	1.0 km	MPC · JPL
817603	2012 TV_{37}	—	September 16, 2012	Mount Lemmon	Mount Lemmon Survey	·	1.4 km	MPC · JPL
817604	2012 TF_{39}	—	October 8, 2012	Mount Lemmon	Mount Lemmon Survey	·	870 m	MPC · JPL
817605	2012 TC_{40}	—	October 8, 2012	Mount Lemmon	Mount Lemmon Survey	·	1.4 km	MPC · JPL
817606	2012 TL_{43}	—	October 8, 2012	Haleakala	Pan-STARRS 1	·	1.6 km	MPC · JPL
817607	2012 TX_{53}	—	July 7, 2005	Kitt Peak	Spacewatch	·	670 m	MPC · JPL
817608	2012 TD_{67}	—	August 31, 2005	Kitt Peak	Spacewatch	·	540 m	MPC · JPL
817609	2012 TX_{67}	—	September 6, 2008	Catalina	CSS	·	1.0 km	MPC · JPL
817610	2012 TA_{68}	—	September 9, 2008	Mount Lemmon	Mount Lemmon Survey	·	930 m	MPC · JPL
817611	2012 TU_{71}	—	August 22, 2006	Palomar	NEAT	LIX	3.2 km	MPC · JPL
817612	2012 TJ_{75}	—	October 9, 2012	Haleakala	Pan-STARRS 1	·	610 m	MPC · JPL
817613	2012 TV_{75}	—	October 8, 2012	Mount Lemmon	Mount Lemmon Survey	·	840 m	MPC · JPL
817614	2012 TZ_{76}	—	August 26, 2012	Haleakala	Pan-STARRS 1	·	1.5 km	MPC · JPL
817615	2012 TF_{83}	—	November 4, 2005	Kitt Peak	Spacewatch	·	840 m	MPC · JPL
817616	2012 TE_{89}	—	October 30, 2008	Kitt Peak	Spacewatch	EUN	860 m	MPC · JPL
817617	2012 TC_{90}	—	October 7, 2012	Haleakala	Pan-STARRS 1	JUN	670 m	MPC · JPL
817618	2012 TN_{91}	—	September 17, 2012	Kitt Peak	Spacewatch	·	990 m	MPC · JPL
817619	2012 TY_{92}	—	October 7, 2012	Haleakala	Pan-STARRS 1	·	620 m	MPC · JPL
817620	2012 TS_{95}	—	October 8, 2012	Kitt Peak	Spacewatch	·	1.3 km	MPC · JPL
817621	2012 TP_{96}	—	October 8, 2012	Kitt Peak	Spacewatch	·	740 m	MPC · JPL
817622	2012 TQ_{99}	—	September 18, 2003	Kitt Peak	Spacewatch	·	1.4 km	MPC · JPL
817623	2012 TQ_{100}	—	October 8, 2012	Catalina	CSS	JUN	770 m	MPC · JPL
817624	2012 TC_{103}	—	August 25, 2005	Palomar	NEAT	(2076)	680 m	MPC · JPL
817625	2012 TN_{103}	—	September 26, 2006	Mount Lemmon	Mount Lemmon Survey	·	2.4 km	MPC · JPL
817626	2012 TH_{105}	—	September 15, 2012	Kitt Peak	Spacewatch	NYS	920 m	MPC · JPL
817627	2012 TC_{106}	—	October 12, 2007	Kitt Peak	Spacewatch	EOS	1.3 km	MPC · JPL
817628	2012 TU_{112}	—	September 1, 2005	Kitt Peak	Spacewatch	(1338) (FLO)	410 m	MPC · JPL
817629	2012 TD_{117}	—	October 18, 2003	Kitt Peak	Spacewatch	NEM	1.6 km	MPC · JPL
817630	2012 TJ_{119}	—	September 25, 2012	Kitt Peak	Spacewatch	·	570 m	MPC · JPL
817631	2012 TF_{124}	—	October 9, 2012	Haleakala	Pan-STARRS 1	L5	6.7 km	MPC · JPL
817632	2012 TR_{126}	—	September 17, 2012	Kitt Peak	Spacewatch	·	2.1 km	MPC · JPL
817633	2012 TY_{129}	—	October 8, 2012	Haleakala	Pan-STARRS 1	·	580 m	MPC · JPL
817634	2012 TJ_{130}	—	August 25, 2005	Palomar	NEAT	PHO	760 m	MPC · JPL
817635	2012 TT_{130}	—	November 29, 2003	Kitt Peak	Spacewatch	·	1.5 km	MPC · JPL
817636	2012 TW_{134}	—	October 6, 2012	Haleakala	Pan-STARRS 1	·	960 m	MPC · JPL
817637	2012 TP_{137}	—	September 15, 2012	Catalina	CSS	·	1.3 km	MPC · JPL
817638	2012 TH_{142}	—	October 6, 2012	Haleakala	Pan-STARRS 1	·	1.6 km	MPC · JPL
817639	2012 TN_{142}	—	October 6, 2012	Haleakala	Pan-STARRS 1	H	390 m	MPC · JPL
817640	2012 TA_{145}	—	September 27, 1994	Kitt Peak	Spacewatch	·	910 m	MPC · JPL
817641	2012 TH_{149}	—	October 16, 2003	Kitt Peak	Spacewatch	·	1.1 km	MPC · JPL
817642	2012 TX_{149}	—	January 23, 2006	Mount Lemmon	Mount Lemmon Survey	NYS	740 m	MPC · JPL
817643	2012 TR_{150}	—	November 8, 2007	Kitt Peak	Spacewatch	·	1.4 km	MPC · JPL
817644	2012 TB_{162}	—	September 23, 2012	Kitt Peak	Spacewatch	·	2.4 km	MPC · JPL
817645	2012 TY_{162}	—	September 13, 2005	Kitt Peak	Spacewatch	·	540 m	MPC · JPL
817646	2012 TM_{164}	—	September 22, 2012	Kitt Peak	Spacewatch	KOR	1.2 km	MPC · JPL
817647	2012 TS_{165}	—	October 1, 2005	Mount Lemmon	Mount Lemmon Survey	·	690 m	MPC · JPL
817648	2012 TY_{165}	—	October 8, 2012	Haleakala	Pan-STARRS 1	·	1.2 km	MPC · JPL
817649	2012 TA_{166}	—	October 8, 2012	Haleakala	Pan-STARRS 1	WAT	1.1 km	MPC · JPL
817650	2012 TX_{176}	—	November 2, 1999	Kitt Peak	Spacewatch	·	1.1 km	MPC · JPL
817651	2012 TC_{178}	—	October 9, 2012	Haleakala	Pan-STARRS 1	·	1.3 km	MPC · JPL
817652	2012 TW_{178}	—	September 20, 2003	Kitt Peak	Spacewatch	·	1.4 km	MPC · JPL
817653	2012 TX_{178}	—	October 9, 2012	Haleakala	Pan-STARRS 1	V	570 m	MPC · JPL
817654	2012 TQ_{179}	—	October 9, 2012	Haleakala	Pan-STARRS 1	V	500 m	MPC · JPL
817655	2012 TK_{185}	—	October 4, 2007	Kitt Peak	Spacewatch	·	1.4 km	MPC · JPL
817656	2012 TT_{192}	—	October 2, 2003	Kitt Peak	Spacewatch	·	1.1 km	MPC · JPL
817657	2012 TZ_{192}	—	October 10, 2012	Mount Lemmon	Mount Lemmon Survey	·	1.3 km	MPC · JPL
817658	2012 TJ_{194}	—	October 10, 2012	Kitt Peak	Spacewatch	·	1.6 km	MPC · JPL
817659	2012 TK_{198}	—	October 11, 1999	Kitt Peak	Spacewatch	·	450 m	MPC · JPL
817660	2012 TQ_{199}	—	October 20, 2003	Kitt Peak	Spacewatch	·	1.2 km	MPC · JPL
817661	2012 TQ_{201}	—	October 11, 2012	Mount Lemmon	Mount Lemmon Survey	·	480 m	MPC · JPL
817662	2012 TO_{203}	—	October 11, 2012	Mount Lemmon	Mount Lemmon Survey	·	690 m	MPC · JPL
817663	2012 TZ_{204}	—	October 11, 2012	Kitt Peak	Spacewatch	·	1.2 km	MPC · JPL
817664	2012 TV_{207}	—	September 21, 2012	Mount Lemmon	Mount Lemmon Survey	·	1.7 km	MPC · JPL
817665	2012 TA_{208}	—	October 11, 2012	Kitt Peak	Spacewatch	·	900 m	MPC · JPL
817666	2012 TX_{209}	—	October 5, 2012	Haleakala	Pan-STARRS 1	·	920 m	MPC · JPL
817667	2012 TN_{214}	—	January 9, 2006	Kitt Peak	Spacewatch	·	680 m	MPC · JPL
817668	2012 TY_{219}	—	August 31, 2005	Kitt Peak	Spacewatch	·	580 m	MPC · JPL
817669	2012 TT_{237}	—	October 6, 2008	Mount Lemmon	Mount Lemmon Survey	(5)	1.2 km	MPC · JPL
817670	2012 TA_{243}	—	October 20, 2003	Kitt Peak	Spacewatch	·	1.6 km	MPC · JPL
817671	2012 TK_{243}	—	October 8, 2012	Haleakala	Pan-STARRS 1	·	850 m	MPC · JPL
817672	2012 TC_{251}	—	October 11, 2012	Haleakala	Pan-STARRS 1	V	440 m	MPC · JPL
817673	2012 TC_{253}	—	October 11, 2012	Haleakala	Pan-STARRS 1	·	600 m	MPC · JPL
817674	2012 TN_{253}	—	October 11, 2012	Haleakala	Pan-STARRS 1	·	840 m	MPC · JPL
817675	2012 TY_{254}	—	October 13, 2012	Kitt Peak	Spacewatch	·	1.0 km	MPC · JPL
817676	2012 TZ_{262}	—	October 16, 2003	Kitt Peak	Spacewatch	·	1.4 km	MPC · JPL
817677	2012 TX_{266}	—	October 8, 2012	Haleakala	Pan-STARRS 1	H	410 m	MPC · JPL
817678	2012 TZ_{273}	—	May 27, 2008	Kitt Peak	Spacewatch	·	500 m	MPC · JPL
817679	2012 TQ_{275}	—	October 11, 2012	Haleakala	Pan-STARRS 1	V	450 m	MPC · JPL
817680	2012 TT_{288}	—	October 10, 2012	Mount Lemmon	Mount Lemmon Survey	·	1.7 km	MPC · JPL
817681	2012 TB_{289}	—	October 10, 2012	Mount Lemmon	Mount Lemmon Survey	·	1.7 km	MPC · JPL
817682	2012 TQ_{290}	—	October 14, 2012	Kislovodsk	ISON-Kislovodsk Observatory	·	1.5 km	MPC · JPL
817683	2012 TR_{290}	—	October 14, 2012	Kislovodsk	ISON-Kislovodsk Observatory	EUN	980 m	MPC · JPL
817684	2012 TX_{303}	—	November 20, 2001	Socorro	LINEAR	NYS	1.0 km	MPC · JPL
817685	2012 TQ_{307}	—	September 17, 2012	Nogales	M. Schwartz, P. R. Holvorcem	JUN	820 m	MPC · JPL
817686	2012 TT_{307}	—	October 10, 2012	Mount Lemmon	Mount Lemmon Survey	·	1.2 km	MPC · JPL
817687	2012 TW_{319}	—	October 9, 2012	Haleakala	Pan-STARRS 1	H	390 m	MPC · JPL
817688	2012 TT_{320}	—	September 26, 2012	Nogales	M. Schwartz, P. R. Holvorcem	·	1.3 km	MPC · JPL
817689	2012 TH_{330}	—	October 14, 2012	Kitt Peak	Spacewatch	·	1.4 km	MPC · JPL
817690	2012 TF_{332}	—	October 15, 2012	Catalina	CSS	BRA	1.4 km	MPC · JPL
817691	2012 TW_{334}	—	August 14, 2016	Haleakala	Pan-STARRS 1	EUN	840 m	MPC · JPL
817692	2012 TU_{336}	—	October 10, 2012	Mount Lemmon	Mount Lemmon Survey	·	2.4 km	MPC · JPL
817693	2012 TT_{339}	—	October 8, 2012	Mount Lemmon	Mount Lemmon Survey	·	1.1 km	MPC · JPL
817694	2012 TW_{339}	—	October 11, 2012	Kitt Peak	Spacewatch	·	1.5 km	MPC · JPL
817695	2012 TL_{340}	—	October 6, 2012	Haleakala	Pan-STARRS 1	·	2.0 km	MPC · JPL
817696	2012 TS_{340}	—	October 9, 2012	Haleakala	Pan-STARRS 1	PHO	930 m	MPC · JPL
817697	2012 TY_{340}	—	October 8, 2012	Haleakala	Pan-STARRS 1	H	270 m	MPC · JPL
817698	2012 TQ_{341}	—	October 7, 2012	Haleakala	Pan-STARRS 1	PHO	870 m	MPC · JPL
817699	2012 TM_{342}	—	October 11, 2012	Haleakala	Pan-STARRS 1	·	360 m	MPC · JPL
817700	2012 TD_{344}	—	October 14, 2012	Kitt Peak	Spacewatch	·	600 m	MPC · JPL

== 817701–817800 ==
back to top

Designation			Discovery			Properties		Ref
Permanent	Provisional	Named after	Date	Site	Discoverer(s)	Category	Diam.	Ref
817701	2012 TV_{345}	—	October 8, 2012	Haleakala	Pan-STARRS 1	·	620 m	MPC · JPL
817702	2012 TJ_{347}	—	July 1, 2017	Haleakala	Pan-STARRS 1	·	2.2 km	MPC · JPL
817703	2012 TP_{348}	—	October 6, 2012	Haleakala	Pan-STARRS 1	H	560 m	MPC · JPL
817704	2012 TV_{348}	—	October 15, 2012	Haleakala	Pan-STARRS 1	PHO	730 m	MPC · JPL
817705	2012 TJ_{353}	—	October 8, 2012	Mount Lemmon	Mount Lemmon Survey	KOR	1.0 km	MPC · JPL
817706	2012 TK_{353}	—	October 11, 2012	Mount Lemmon	Mount Lemmon Survey	·	420 m	MPC · JPL
817707	2012 TX_{353}	—	October 8, 2012	Mount Lemmon	Mount Lemmon Survey	MAS	580 m	MPC · JPL
817708	2012 TW_{355}	—	October 11, 2012	Haleakala	Pan-STARRS 1	·	540 m	MPC · JPL
817709	2012 TD_{357}	—	October 8, 2012	Mount Lemmon	Mount Lemmon Survey	·	460 m	MPC · JPL
817710	2012 TA_{359}	—	October 9, 2012	Mount Lemmon	Mount Lemmon Survey	EUN	740 m	MPC · JPL
817711	2012 TB_{359}	—	October 7, 2012	Kitt Peak	Spacewatch	·	1.6 km	MPC · JPL
817712	2012 TG_{359}	—	October 9, 2012	Haleakala	Pan-STARRS 1	·	1.2 km	MPC · JPL
817713	2012 TE_{361}	—	October 15, 2012	Haleakala	Pan-STARRS 1	·	1.5 km	MPC · JPL
817714	2012 TT_{361}	—	October 15, 2012	Mount Lemmon	Mount Lemmon Survey	EUN	1.1 km	MPC · JPL
817715	2012 TX_{361}	—	October 5, 2012	Haleakala	Pan-STARRS 1	·	830 m	MPC · JPL
817716	2012 TW_{365}	—	October 8, 2012	Mount Lemmon	Mount Lemmon Survey	·	1.4 km	MPC · JPL
817717	2012 TB_{366}	—	October 11, 2012	Haleakala	Pan-STARRS 1	·	920 m	MPC · JPL
817718	2012 TM_{367}	—	December 26, 2005	Kitt Peak	Spacewatch	·	750 m	MPC · JPL
817719	2012 TF_{369}	—	October 10, 2012	Mount Lemmon	Mount Lemmon Survey	·	820 m	MPC · JPL
817720	2012 TJ_{380}	—	October 9, 2012	Mount Lemmon	Mount Lemmon Survey	·	1.0 km	MPC · JPL
817721	2012 TW_{380}	—	October 8, 2012	Kitt Peak	Spacewatch	·	1.4 km	MPC · JPL
817722	2012 TQ_{381}	—	October 15, 2012	Haleakala	Pan-STARRS 1	PHO	730 m	MPC · JPL
817723	2012 TC_{384}	—	October 8, 2012	Mount Lemmon	Mount Lemmon Survey	·	500 m	MPC · JPL
817724	2012 TA_{386}	—	October 6, 2012	Haleakala	Pan-STARRS 1	·	590 m	MPC · JPL
817725	2012 TW_{386}	—	October 9, 2012	Mount Lemmon	Mount Lemmon Survey	·	1.0 km	MPC · JPL
817726	2012 TM_{391}	—	October 8, 2012	Haleakala	Pan-STARRS 1	V	360 m	MPC · JPL
817727	2012 TZ_{404}	—	May 12, 2011	Mount Lemmon	Mount Lemmon Survey	·	1.4 km	MPC · JPL
817728	2012 UQ_{1}	—	August 30, 2008	La Sagra	OAM	·	1.0 km	MPC · JPL
817729	2012 UE_{2}	—	November 10, 2005	Kitt Peak	Spacewatch	MAS	580 m	MPC · JPL
817730	2012 UG_{11}	—	October 8, 2012	Mount Lemmon	Mount Lemmon Survey	AGN	780 m	MPC · JPL
817731	2012 UZ_{19}	—	October 16, 2012	Mount Lemmon	Mount Lemmon Survey	·	1.3 km	MPC · JPL
817732	2012 UO_{21}	—	October 16, 2012	Mount Lemmon	Mount Lemmon Survey	·	1.5 km	MPC · JPL
817733	2012 UR_{22}	—	October 8, 2012	Kitt Peak	Spacewatch	·	1.2 km	MPC · JPL
817734	2012 UQ_{24}	—	October 17, 2012	Mount Lemmon	Mount Lemmon Survey	·	600 m	MPC · JPL
817735	2012 UY_{24}	—	October 17, 2012	Mount Lemmon	Mount Lemmon Survey	·	520 m	MPC · JPL
817736	2012 UQ_{27}	—	October 17, 2012	Piszkéstető	K. Sárneczky	·	1.4 km	MPC · JPL
817737	2012 UP_{33}	—	October 19, 1995	Kitt Peak	Spacewatch	·	550 m	MPC · JPL
817738	2012 UJ_{34}	—	October 18, 2012	Haleakala	Pan-STARRS 1	H	490 m	MPC · JPL
817739	2012 UQ_{35}	—	July 5, 2005	Mount Lemmon	Mount Lemmon Survey	·	450 m	MPC · JPL
817740	2012 UK_{36}	—	September 19, 2001	Socorro	LINEAR	MAS	580 m	MPC · JPL
817741	2012 UX_{37}	—	November 19, 2003	Kitt Peak	Spacewatch	·	1.4 km	MPC · JPL
817742	2012 UP_{39}	—	October 17, 2012	Kitt Peak	Spacewatch	·	940 m	MPC · JPL
817743	2012 UW_{40}	—	October 17, 2012	Haleakala	Pan-STARRS 1	AEO	920 m	MPC · JPL
817744	2012 UJ_{42}	—	October 8, 2012	Kitt Peak	Spacewatch	NYS	870 m	MPC · JPL
817745	2012 UN_{42}	—	September 16, 2012	Mount Lemmon	Mount Lemmon Survey	·	3.2 km	MPC · JPL
817746	2012 UA_{43}	—	September 23, 2012	Mount Lemmon	Mount Lemmon Survey	MAS	640 m	MPC · JPL
817747	2012 UK_{46}	—	September 20, 2001	Kitt Peak	Spacewatch	·	960 m	MPC · JPL
817748	2012 UV_{47}	—	October 18, 2012	Haleakala	Pan-STARRS 1	MAS	630 m	MPC · JPL
817749	2012 UD_{56}	—	November 21, 2005	Kitt Peak	Spacewatch	·	870 m	MPC · JPL
817750	2012 UF_{57}	—	October 19, 2012	Haleakala	Pan-STARRS 1	EUN	920 m	MPC · JPL
817751	2012 UO_{64}	—	October 20, 2012	Mount Lemmon	Mount Lemmon Survey	·	1.1 km	MPC · JPL
817752	2012 UD_{65}	—	December 2, 1999	Kitt Peak	Spacewatch	·	780 m	MPC · JPL
817753	2012 UO_{65}	—	October 20, 2012	Kitt Peak	Spacewatch	·	960 m	MPC · JPL
817754	2012 UQ_{69}	—	October 16, 2012	Kitt Peak	Spacewatch	·	910 m	MPC · JPL
817755	2012 UO_{73}	—	October 17, 2012	Haleakala	Pan-STARRS 1	·	1.4 km	MPC · JPL
817756	2012 UY_{81}	—	October 15, 2012	Kitt Peak	Spacewatch	GEF	980 m	MPC · JPL
817757	2012 UJ_{83}	—	September 7, 2008	Mount Lemmon	Mount Lemmon Survey	·	810 m	MPC · JPL
817758	2012 UY_{84}	—	September 25, 2012	Mount Lemmon	Mount Lemmon Survey	V	540 m	MPC · JPL
817759	2012 UN_{95}	—	October 17, 2012	Haleakala	Pan-STARRS 1	·	1.4 km	MPC · JPL
817760	2012 UO_{99}	—	March 12, 2007	Kitt Peak	Spacewatch	·	730 m	MPC · JPL
817761	2012 UN_{103}	—	October 18, 2012	Haleakala	Pan-STARRS 1	·	890 m	MPC · JPL
817762	2012 US_{107}	—	October 8, 2012	Mount Lemmon	Mount Lemmon Survey	3:2 · SHU	3.5 km	MPC · JPL
817763	2012 UQ_{110}	—	October 21, 2012	Haleakala	Pan-STARRS 1	·	500 m	MPC · JPL
817764	2012 UV_{112}	—	August 29, 2005	Kitt Peak	Spacewatch	·	500 m	MPC · JPL
817765	2012 UA_{113}	—	October 24, 2008	Kitt Peak	Spacewatch	·	800 m	MPC · JPL
817766	2012 UY_{114}	—	October 11, 2012	Haleakala	Pan-STARRS 1	AEO	770 m	MPC · JPL
817767	2012 UL_{115}	—	October 11, 2012	Haleakala	Pan-STARRS 1	·	1.3 km	MPC · JPL
817768	2012 UR_{115}	—	October 11, 2012	Haleakala	Pan-STARRS 1	·	1.6 km	MPC · JPL
817769	2012 UX_{116}	—	October 11, 2012	Haleakala	Pan-STARRS 1	·	1.2 km	MPC · JPL
817770	2012 UC_{122}	—	October 22, 2012	Haleakala	Pan-STARRS 1	·	650 m	MPC · JPL
817771	2012 UM_{128}	—	October 18, 2012	Mount Lemmon	Mount Lemmon Survey	·	1.3 km	MPC · JPL
817772	2012 UN_{130}	—	October 21, 2012	Haleakala	Pan-STARRS 1	·	1.3 km	MPC · JPL
817773	2012 UD_{131}	—	October 8, 2012	Haleakala	Pan-STARRS 1	·	900 m	MPC · JPL
817774	2012 UQ_{131}	—	October 18, 2001	Palomar	NEAT	NYS	970 m	MPC · JPL
817775	2012 UJ_{134}	—	October 19, 2012	Mount Lemmon	Mount Lemmon Survey	·	1.3 km	MPC · JPL
817776	2012 UA_{135}	—	October 19, 2001	Palomar	NEAT	H	410 m	MPC · JPL
817777	2012 UX_{135}	—	October 6, 2012	Haleakala	Pan-STARRS 1	·	1.4 km	MPC · JPL
817778	2012 UF_{136}	—	July 22, 2003	Palomar	NEAT	(1547)	1.5 km	MPC · JPL
817779	2012 UZ_{137}	—	October 22, 2012	Mount Lemmon	Mount Lemmon Survey	H	330 m	MPC · JPL
817780	2012 UT_{142}	—	October 18, 2012	Haleakala	Pan-STARRS 1	·	510 m	MPC · JPL
817781	2012 UB_{144}	—	August 31, 2005	Kitt Peak	Spacewatch	·	510 m	MPC · JPL
817782	2012 UB_{150}	—	October 21, 2012	Kitt Peak	Spacewatch	·	1.4 km	MPC · JPL
817783	2012 UT_{150}	—	October 27, 2003	Kitt Peak	Spacewatch	·	1.1 km	MPC · JPL
817784	2012 UY_{153}	—	August 21, 2008	Kitt Peak	Spacewatch	·	1.0 km	MPC · JPL
817785	2012 UN_{159}	—	October 15, 2012	Mount Lemmon	Mount Lemmon Survey	·	870 m	MPC · JPL
817786	2012 UG_{163}	—	October 8, 2008	Mount Lemmon	Mount Lemmon Survey	·	890 m	MPC · JPL
817787	2012 UO_{170}	—	October 9, 2012	Catalina	CSS	·	1.4 km	MPC · JPL
817788	2012 UM_{176}	—	July 28, 2005	Palomar	NEAT	·	460 m	MPC · JPL
817789	2012 US_{183}	—	October 16, 2012	Mount Lemmon	Mount Lemmon Survey	·	830 m	MPC · JPL
817790	2012 UJ_{185}	—	October 17, 2012	Haleakala	Pan-STARRS 1	·	2.0 km	MPC · JPL
817791	2012 UF_{186}	—	April 11, 2016	Haleakala	Pan-STARRS 1	·	2.5 km	MPC · JPL
817792	2012 UF_{187}	—	October 26, 2012	Haleakala	Pan-STARRS 1	·	1.6 km	MPC · JPL
817793	2012 UF_{189}	—	October 21, 2012	Haleakala	Pan-STARRS 1	V	530 m	MPC · JPL
817794	2012 UJ_{189}	—	October 25, 2012	Kitt Peak	Spacewatch	THM	1.7 km	MPC · JPL
817795	2012 UD_{195}	—	October 20, 2012	Mount Lemmon	Mount Lemmon Survey	V	410 m	MPC · JPL
817796	2012 UK_{198}	—	October 22, 2012	Haleakala	Pan-STARRS 1	·	540 m	MPC · JPL
817797	2012 UN_{200}	—	October 18, 2012	Haleakala	Pan-STARRS 1	·	590 m	MPC · JPL
817798	2012 UD_{201}	—	October 17, 2012	Haleakala	Pan-STARRS 1	·	560 m	MPC · JPL
817799	2012 UL_{202}	—	October 22, 2012	Haleakala	Pan-STARRS 1	·	1.5 km	MPC · JPL
817800	2012 UL_{205}	—	October 18, 2012	Haleakala	Pan-STARRS 1	LIX	3.0 km	MPC · JPL

== 817801–817900 ==
back to top

Designation			Discovery			Properties		Ref
Permanent	Provisional	Named after	Date	Site	Discoverer(s)	Category	Diam.	Ref
817801	2012 UY_{205}	—	October 17, 2012	Haleakala	Pan-STARRS 1	NYS	770 m	MPC · JPL
817802	2012 UE_{211}	—	October 18, 2012	Haleakala	Pan-STARRS 1	·	1.4 km	MPC · JPL
817803	2012 UK_{213}	—	October 16, 2012	Mount Lemmon	Mount Lemmon Survey	MAS	550 m	MPC · JPL
817804	2012 UP_{213}	—	October 18, 2012	Haleakala	Pan-STARRS 1	KOR	940 m	MPC · JPL
817805	2012 UA_{215}	—	October 21, 2012	Kitt Peak	Spacewatch	·	1.4 km	MPC · JPL
817806	2012 US_{215}	—	October 21, 2012	Mount Lemmon	Mount Lemmon Survey	·	1.3 km	MPC · JPL
817807	2012 UW_{215}	—	October 22, 2012	Catalina	CSS	·	1.6 km	MPC · JPL
817808	2012 UP_{216}	—	October 26, 2012	Haleakala	Pan-STARRS 1	H	410 m	MPC · JPL
817809	2012 UB_{218}	—	October 22, 2012	Haleakala	Pan-STARRS 1	·	1.7 km	MPC · JPL
817810	2012 UC_{221}	—	October 18, 2012	Haleakala	Pan-STARRS 1	·	800 m	MPC · JPL
817811	2012 UX_{222}	—	October 18, 2012	Haleakala	Pan-STARRS 1	H	320 m	MPC · JPL
817812	2012 UJ_{223}	—	October 17, 2012	Catalina	CSS	H	390 m	MPC · JPL
817813	2012 UF_{225}	—	October 20, 2012	Haleakala	Pan-STARRS 1	·	1.0 km	MPC · JPL
817814	2012 UP_{226}	—	October 17, 2012	Mount Lemmon	Mount Lemmon Survey	AGN	1 km	MPC · JPL
817815	2012 UW_{226}	—	October 20, 2012	Haleakala	Pan-STARRS 1	·	870 m	MPC · JPL
817816	2012 UD_{227}	—	October 17, 2012	Mount Lemmon	Mount Lemmon Survey	·	820 m	MPC · JPL
817817	2012 UA_{235}	—	October 19, 2012	Haleakala	Pan-STARRS 1	·	1.6 km	MPC · JPL
817818	2012 UO_{237}	—	February 9, 2010	Kitt Peak	Spacewatch	V	510 m	MPC · JPL
817819	2012 UZ_{237}	—	October 17, 2012	Mount Lemmon	Mount Lemmon Survey	·	1.5 km	MPC · JPL
817820	2012 UM_{238}	—	October 21, 2012	Haleakala	Pan-STARRS 1	HOF	2.1 km	MPC · JPL
817821	2012 UG_{240}	—	October 17, 2012	Haleakala	Pan-STARRS 1	·	1.5 km	MPC · JPL
817822	2012 UR_{248}	—	October 16, 2012	Kitt Peak	Spacewatch	H	390 m	MPC · JPL
817823	2012 UU_{261}	—	October 22, 2012	Mount Lemmon	Mount Lemmon Survey	·	960 m	MPC · JPL
817824	2012 VG_{1}	—	May 1, 2011	Haleakala	Pan-STARRS 1	·	990 m	MPC · JPL
817825	2012 VA_{2}	—	November 3, 2012	Haleakala	Pan-STARRS 1	H	430 m	MPC · JPL
817826	2012 VR_{2}	—	October 23, 2012	Mount Lemmon	Mount Lemmon Survey	H	290 m	MPC · JPL
817827	2012 VY_{6}	—	October 10, 2012	Haleakala	Pan-STARRS 1	H	410 m	MPC · JPL
817828	2012 VY_{8}	—	October 8, 2012	Kitt Peak	Spacewatch	·	1.1 km	MPC · JPL
817829	2012 VK_{9}	—	September 16, 2012	Kitt Peak	Spacewatch	AGN	860 m	MPC · JPL
817830	2012 VE_{12}	—	October 13, 2007	Mount Lemmon	Mount Lemmon Survey	KOR	910 m	MPC · JPL
817831	2012 VD_{13}	—	August 29, 2005	Kitt Peak	Spacewatch	·	470 m	MPC · JPL
817832	2012 VR_{13}	—	October 18, 2012	Haleakala	Pan-STARRS 1	·	850 m	MPC · JPL
817833	2012 VK_{16}	—	October 6, 2012	Mount Lemmon	Mount Lemmon Survey	·	790 m	MPC · JPL
817834	2012 VF_{20}	—	November 3, 2012	Haleakala	Pan-STARRS 1	H	420 m	MPC · JPL
817835	2012 VH_{22}	—	October 18, 2012	Haleakala	Pan-STARRS 1	·	450 m	MPC · JPL
817836	2012 VX_{26}	—	October 11, 2012	Haleakala	Pan-STARRS 1	·	500 m	MPC · JPL
817837	2012 VO_{30}	—	October 22, 2012	Mount Lemmon	Mount Lemmon Survey	H	340 m	MPC · JPL
817838	2012 VC_{35}	—	January 28, 2006	Kitt Peak	Spacewatch	·	830 m	MPC · JPL
817839	2012 VN_{38}	—	October 17, 2003	Palomar	NEAT	·	1.5 km	MPC · JPL
817840	2012 VW_{38}	—	October 15, 2012	Haleakala	Pan-STARRS 1	·	900 m	MPC · JPL
817841	2012 VW_{39}	—	October 18, 2012	Piszkés-tető	K. Sárneczky, G. Hodosán	·	1.5 km	MPC · JPL
817842	2012 VV_{48}	—	October 8, 2012	Kitt Peak	Spacewatch	·	1.3 km	MPC · JPL
817843	2012 VU_{51}	—	November 6, 2012	Kitt Peak	Spacewatch	·	590 m	MPC · JPL
817844	2012 VM_{58}	—	January 7, 2006	Mauna Kea	P. A. Wiegert, D. D. Balam	T_{j} (2.96)	2.3 km	MPC · JPL
817845	2012 VX_{62}	—	October 18, 2012	Haleakala	Pan-STARRS 1	MAS	620 m	MPC · JPL
817846	2012 VA_{64}	—	October 16, 2012	Kitt Peak	Spacewatch	·	650 m	MPC · JPL
817847	2012 VX_{65}	—	October 8, 2012	Mount Lemmon	Mount Lemmon Survey	·	860 m	MPC · JPL
817848	2012 VB_{69}	—	December 3, 2005	Kitt Peak	Spacewatch	·	790 m	MPC · JPL
817849	2012 VD_{72}	—	September 3, 2008	Kitt Peak	Spacewatch	·	760 m	MPC · JPL
817850	2012 VE_{73}	—	October 20, 2012	Mount Lemmon	Mount Lemmon Survey	·	1.3 km	MPC · JPL
817851	2012 VF_{80}	—	June 10, 2012	Haleakala	Pan-STARRS 1	AMO	640 m	MPC · JPL
817852	2012 VT_{84}	—	October 14, 2012	Kitt Peak	Spacewatch	·	480 m	MPC · JPL
817853	2012 VK_{85}	—	October 6, 2012	Kitt Peak	Spacewatch	·	1.6 km	MPC · JPL
817854	2012 VQ_{93}	—	November 5, 2012	Kitt Peak	Spacewatch	·	1.5 km	MPC · JPL
817855	2012 VO_{96}	—	November 19, 2003	Kitt Peak	Spacewatch	·	1.2 km	MPC · JPL
817856	2012 VY_{99}	—	November 11, 2012	Nogales	M. Schwartz, P. R. Holvorcem	·	1.6 km	MPC · JPL
817857	2012 VD_{101}	—	October 21, 2012	Haleakala	Pan-STARRS 1	·	1.4 km	MPC · JPL
817858	2012 VW_{101}	—	November 30, 2008	Mount Lemmon	Mount Lemmon Survey	·	650 m	MPC · JPL
817859	2012 VG_{109}	—	October 10, 2008	Mount Lemmon	Mount Lemmon Survey	PHO	660 m	MPC · JPL
817860	2012 VH_{114}	—	November 7, 2012	Mount Lemmon	Mount Lemmon Survey	H	340 m	MPC · JPL
817861	2012 VK_{117}	—	November 6, 2012	Mount Lemmon	Mount Lemmon Survey	·	1.5 km	MPC · JPL
817862	2012 VL_{120}	—	February 23, 2015	Haleakala	Pan-STARRS 1	PHO	660 m	MPC · JPL
817863	2012 VK_{124}	—	November 7, 2012	Haleakala	Pan-STARRS 1	·	1.4 km	MPC · JPL
817864	2012 VG_{125}	—	August 12, 2015	Haleakala	Pan-STARRS 1	·	580 m	MPC · JPL
817865	2012 VJ_{129}	—	October 9, 2012	Mount Lemmon	Mount Lemmon Survey	(5)	980 m	MPC · JPL
817866	2012 VN_{131}	—	November 14, 2012	Kitt Peak	Spacewatch	·	1.5 km	MPC · JPL
817867	2012 VV_{132}	—	November 4, 2012	Mount Lemmon	Mount Lemmon Survey	·	870 m	MPC · JPL
817868	2012 VR_{133}	—	November 7, 2012	Haleakala	Pan-STARRS 1	·	1.2 km	MPC · JPL
817869	2012 VB_{134}	—	February 14, 2010	Mount Lemmon	Mount Lemmon Survey	·	850 m	MPC · JPL
817870	2012 VT_{135}	—	November 3, 2012	Mount Lemmon	Mount Lemmon Survey	·	470 m	MPC · JPL
817871	2012 VG_{136}	—	November 6, 2012	Mount Lemmon	Mount Lemmon Survey	HOF	2.1 km	MPC · JPL
817872	2012 VL_{136}	—	November 13, 2012	ESA OGS	ESA OGS	MAS	450 m	MPC · JPL
817873	2012 VS_{137}	—	November 12, 2012	Haleakala	Pan-STARRS 1	PHO	750 m	MPC · JPL
817874	2012 VR_{138}	—	November 11, 2012	Haleakala	Pan-STARRS 1	BAR	1.2 km	MPC · JPL
817875	2012 VB_{142}	—	November 7, 2012	Kitt Peak	Spacewatch	·	1.4 km	MPC · JPL
817876	2012 VC_{142}	—	November 13, 2012	Mount Lemmon	Mount Lemmon Survey	H	420 m	MPC · JPL
817877	2012 WG_{4}	—	October 18, 2012	Haleakala	Pan-STARRS 1	·	1.1 km	MPC · JPL
817878	2012 WY_{7}	—	January 2, 2009	Mount Lemmon	Mount Lemmon Survey	·	1.0 km	MPC · JPL
817879	2012 WT_{10}	—	October 6, 2012	Catalina	CSS	·	1.4 km	MPC · JPL
817880	2012 WP_{13}	—	November 19, 2012	Kitt Peak	Spacewatch	·	620 m	MPC · JPL
817881	2012 WR_{17}	—	November 20, 2012	Mount Lemmon	Mount Lemmon Survey	H	480 m	MPC · JPL
817882	2012 WX_{27}	—	October 19, 2003	Sacramento Peak	SDSS	·	1.4 km	MPC · JPL
817883	2012 WW_{36}	—	November 26, 2012	Mount Lemmon	Mount Lemmon Survey	HNS	960 m	MPC · JPL
817884	2012 WJ_{37}	—	November 19, 2012	Kitt Peak	Spacewatch	·	2.0 km	MPC · JPL
817885	2012 WG_{40}	—	June 15, 2018	Haleakala	Pan-STARRS 1	·	640 m	MPC · JPL
817886	2012 WJ_{42}	—	November 22, 2012	Kitt Peak	Spacewatch	·	770 m	MPC · JPL
817887	2012 WC_{43}	—	August 27, 2005	Palomar	NEAT	·	590 m	MPC · JPL
817888	2012 WM_{44}	—	November 4, 2012	Catalina	CSS	·	1.3 km	MPC · JPL
817889	2012 WS_{45}	—	November 23, 2012	Kitt Peak	Spacewatch	·	1.5 km	MPC · JPL
817890	2012 XN_{1}	—	October 22, 2012	Kitt Peak	Spacewatch	·	530 m	MPC · JPL
817891	2012 XP_{1}	—	October 7, 2008	Mount Lemmon	Mount Lemmon Survey	·	1.0 km	MPC · JPL
817892	2012 XS_{6}	—	May 31, 2009	Cerro Burek	I. de la Cueva	H	430 m	MPC · JPL
817893	2012 XJ_{7}	—	December 2, 2012	Mount Lemmon	Mount Lemmon Survey	H	360 m	MPC · JPL
817894	2012 XA_{11}	—	October 17, 2012	Mount Lemmon	Mount Lemmon Survey	·	1.7 km	MPC · JPL
817895	2012 XR_{12}	—	May 1, 2011	Haleakala	Pan-STARRS 1	·	600 m	MPC · JPL
817896	2012 XX_{17}	—	October 20, 2008	Mount Lemmon	Mount Lemmon Survey	·	930 m	MPC · JPL
817897	2012 XN_{20}	—	November 6, 2012	Kitt Peak	Spacewatch	·	550 m	MPC · JPL
817898	2012 XA_{21}	—	November 12, 2012	Mount Lemmon	Mount Lemmon Survey	·	860 m	MPC · JPL
817899	2012 XY_{24}	—	December 3, 2012	Mount Lemmon	Mount Lemmon Survey	·	1.0 km	MPC · JPL
817900	2012 XE_{27}	—	November 12, 2007	Mount Lemmon	Mount Lemmon Survey	·	1.8 km	MPC · JPL

== 817901–818000 ==
back to top

Designation			Discovery			Properties		Ref
Permanent	Provisional	Named after	Date	Site	Discoverer(s)	Category	Diam.	Ref
817901	2012 XJ_{41}	—	December 3, 2012	Mount Lemmon	Mount Lemmon Survey	V	470 m	MPC · JPL
817902	2012 XN_{41}	—	November 7, 2012	Kitt Peak	Spacewatch	·	970 m	MPC · JPL
817903	2012 XY_{44}	—	December 3, 2012	Mount Lemmon	Mount Lemmon Survey	·	890 m	MPC · JPL
817904	2012 XQ_{49}	—	November 25, 2004	Wrightwood	J. W. Young	H	430 m	MPC · JPL
817905	2012 XM_{51}	—	November 14, 2012	Kitt Peak	Spacewatch	·	1.3 km	MPC · JPL
817906	2012 XU_{51}	—	October 25, 2012	Piszkés-tető	K. Sárneczky, T. Vorobjov	·	1.8 km	MPC · JPL
817907	2012 XY_{53}	—	November 22, 2012	Kitt Peak	Spacewatch	·	1.6 km	MPC · JPL
817908	2012 XA_{54}	—	December 7, 2012	Nogales	M. Schwartz, P. R. Holvorcem	·	1.4 km	MPC · JPL
817909	2012 XD_{56}	—	December 10, 2012	Haleakala	Pan-STARRS 1	H	440 m	MPC · JPL
817910	2012 XU_{58}	—	November 7, 2012	Mount Lemmon	Mount Lemmon Survey	·	1.5 km	MPC · JPL
817911	2012 XM_{65}	—	December 4, 2012	Mount Lemmon	Mount Lemmon Survey	·	870 m	MPC · JPL
817912	2012 XR_{65}	—	December 4, 2012	Mount Lemmon	Mount Lemmon Survey	·	1.2 km	MPC · JPL
817913	2012 XO_{66}	—	December 4, 2012	Mount Lemmon	Mount Lemmon Survey	·	870 m	MPC · JPL
817914	2012 XD_{78}	—	September 12, 2007	Mount Lemmon	Mount Lemmon Survey	·	1.5 km	MPC · JPL
817915	2012 XB_{80}	—	November 7, 2012	Haleakala	Pan-STARRS 1	·	1.5 km	MPC · JPL
817916	2012 XH_{83}	—	December 6, 2012	Mount Lemmon	Mount Lemmon Survey	·	780 m	MPC · JPL
817917	2012 XB_{84}	—	December 6, 2012	Mount Lemmon	Mount Lemmon Survey	·	1.5 km	MPC · JPL
817918	2012 XG_{85}	—	December 7, 2012	Haleakala	Pan-STARRS 1	·	1.9 km	MPC · JPL
817919	2012 XM_{86}	—	November 19, 2012	Kitt Peak	Spacewatch	·	990 m	MPC · JPL
817920	2012 XF_{88}	—	August 21, 2008	Kitt Peak	Spacewatch	NYS	750 m	MPC · JPL
817921	2012 XS_{88}	—	March 21, 2001	Kitt Peak	SKADS	·	770 m	MPC · JPL
817922	2012 XR_{91}	—	November 7, 2012	Mount Lemmon	Mount Lemmon Survey	·	1.2 km	MPC · JPL
817923	2012 XN_{95}	—	November 26, 2012	Mount Lemmon	Mount Lemmon Survey	·	1.8 km	MPC · JPL
817924	2012 XC_{97}	—	December 5, 2012	Mount Lemmon	Mount Lemmon Survey	·	1.7 km	MPC · JPL
817925	2012 XO_{98}	—	November 22, 2012	Kitt Peak	Spacewatch	·	530 m	MPC · JPL
817926	2012 XP_{102}	—	December 5, 2012	Mount Lemmon	Mount Lemmon Survey	(5)	1.0 km	MPC · JPL
817927	2012 XM_{115}	—	November 13, 2012	Mount Lemmon	Mount Lemmon Survey	·	1.5 km	MPC · JPL
817928	2012 XV_{117}	—	December 8, 2012	Kitt Peak	Spacewatch	·	2.1 km	MPC · JPL
817929	2012 XZ_{117}	—	December 8, 2012	Kitt Peak	Spacewatch	·	2.0 km	MPC · JPL
817930	2012 XD_{123}	—	December 9, 2012	Haleakala	Pan-STARRS 1	·	780 m	MPC · JPL
817931	2012 XJ_{127}	—	November 14, 2012	Mount Lemmon	Mount Lemmon Survey	·	1.5 km	MPC · JPL
817932	2012 XR_{129}	—	December 11, 2012	Mount Lemmon	Mount Lemmon Survey	EOS	1.3 km	MPC · JPL
817933	2012 XD_{134}	—	December 12, 2012	Haleakala	Pan-STARRS 1	PHO	850 m	MPC · JPL
817934	2012 XX_{136}	—	December 3, 2012	Mount Lemmon	Mount Lemmon Survey	·	1.2 km	MPC · JPL
817935	2012 XE_{140}	—	October 10, 2004	Kitt Peak	Spacewatch	3:2	3.9 km	MPC · JPL
817936	2012 XL_{140}	—	December 2, 2012	Mount Lemmon	Mount Lemmon Survey	·	1.2 km	MPC · JPL
817937	2012 XS_{156}	—	December 13, 2012	Nogales	M. Schwartz, P. R. Holvorcem	·	1.7 km	MPC · JPL
817938	2012 XF_{159}	—	December 9, 2012	Haleakala	Pan-STARRS 1	·	1.5 km	MPC · JPL
817939	2012 XJ_{160}	—	April 11, 2016	Haleakala	Pan-STARRS 1	H	430 m	MPC · JPL
817940	2012 XS_{161}	—	March 27, 2015	Haleakala	Pan-STARRS 1	·	2.3 km	MPC · JPL
817941	2012 XU_{161}	—	December 4, 2012	Mount Lemmon	Mount Lemmon Survey	·	1.0 km	MPC · JPL
817942	2012 XO_{162}	—	December 8, 2012	Mount Lemmon	Mount Lemmon Survey	PHO	800 m	MPC · JPL
817943	2012 XV_{170}	—	December 15, 2012	ESA OGS	ESA OGS	·	1.2 km	MPC · JPL
817944	2012 XF_{173}	—	December 12, 2012	Mount Lemmon	Mount Lemmon Survey	·	1.0 km	MPC · JPL
817945	2012 XA_{174}	—	December 3, 2012	Mount Lemmon	Mount Lemmon Survey	·	860 m	MPC · JPL
817946	2012 XD_{175}	—	December 8, 2012	Nogales	M. Schwartz, P. R. Holvorcem	BRA	1.3 km	MPC · JPL
817947	2012 XN_{175}	—	December 6, 2012	Kitt Peak	Spacewatch	TIR	2.0 km	MPC · JPL
817948	2012 XS_{177}	—	December 4, 2012	Mount Lemmon	Mount Lemmon Survey	·	1.7 km	MPC · JPL
817949	2012 YT_{6}	—	December 10, 2020	Haleakala	Pan-STARRS 1	H	340 m	MPC · JPL
817950	2012 YB_{15}	—	December 23, 2012	Haleakala	Pan-STARRS 1	·	850 m	MPC · JPL
817951	2012 YG_{15}	—	May 28, 2014	Haleakala	Pan-STARRS 1	·	1.0 km	MPC · JPL
817952	2012 YA_{16}	—	July 24, 2015	Haleakala	Pan-STARRS 1	·	1.3 km	MPC · JPL
817953	2012 YZ_{16}	—	December 23, 2012	Haleakala	Pan-STARRS 1	·	870 m	MPC · JPL
817954	2012 YD_{23}	—	December 22, 2012	Haleakala	Pan-STARRS 1	EOS	1.2 km	MPC · JPL
817955	2012 YK_{24}	—	December 22, 2012	Haleakala	Pan-STARRS 1	·	1.8 km	MPC · JPL
817956	2012 YM_{26}	—	December 23, 2012	Haleakala	Pan-STARRS 1	·	2.6 km	MPC · JPL
817957	2013 AC_{8}	—	October 29, 2008	Mount Lemmon	Mount Lemmon Survey	BAR	940 m	MPC · JPL
817958	2013 AT_{10}	—	January 4, 2013	Kitt Peak	Spacewatch	·	600 m	MPC · JPL
817959	2013 AB_{26}	—	January 5, 2013	Mount Lemmon	Mount Lemmon Survey	H	380 m	MPC · JPL
817960	2013 AO_{26}	—	January 5, 2013	Mount Lemmon	Mount Lemmon Survey	·	770 m	MPC · JPL
817961	2013 AP_{26}	—	December 11, 2012	Mount Lemmon	Mount Lemmon Survey	·	860 m	MPC · JPL
817962	2013 AJ_{34}	—	January 4, 2013	Mount Lemmon	Mount Lemmon Survey	·	850 m	MPC · JPL
817963	2013 AK_{36}	—	December 23, 2012	Haleakala	Pan-STARRS 1	·	740 m	MPC · JPL
817964	2013 AU_{46}	—	December 12, 2012	Mount Lemmon	Mount Lemmon Survey	·	1.4 km	MPC · JPL
817965	2013 AJ_{48}	—	January 7, 2013	Mount Lemmon	Mount Lemmon Survey	·	2.0 km	MPC · JPL
817966	2013 AX_{52}	—	January 6, 2013	Mount Lemmon	Mount Lemmon Survey	AMO · PHA	320 m	MPC · JPL
817967	2013 AJ_{62}	—	December 22, 2012	Haleakala	Pan-STARRS 1	·	1.5 km	MPC · JPL
817968	2013 AX_{73}	—	December 22, 2012	Haleakala	Pan-STARRS 1	·	1.5 km	MPC · JPL
817969	2013 AH_{75}	—	December 22, 2012	Haleakala	Pan-STARRS 1	·	1.1 km	MPC · JPL
817970	2013 AL_{84}	—	August 28, 2005	Kitt Peak	Spacewatch	·	470 m	MPC · JPL
817971	2013 AW_{84}	—	November 20, 2008	Kitt Peak	Spacewatch	NYS	670 m	MPC · JPL
817972	2013 AC_{95}	—	April 21, 2009	Mount Lemmon	Mount Lemmon Survey	·	1.2 km	MPC · JPL
817973	2013 AD_{98}	—	October 21, 2003	Palomar	NEAT	·	1.2 km	MPC · JPL
817974	2013 AJ_{106}	—	January 10, 2013	Haleakala	Pan-STARRS 1	·	460 m	MPC · JPL
817975	2013 AG_{107}	—	January 5, 2013	Mount Lemmon	Mount Lemmon Survey	·	1.4 km	MPC · JPL
817976	2013 AK_{119}	—	December 11, 2012	Kitt Peak	Spacewatch	·	1.3 km	MPC · JPL
817977	2013 AE_{130}	—	January 3, 2013	Mount Lemmon	Mount Lemmon Survey	·	860 m	MPC · JPL
817978	2013 AO_{151}	—	January 4, 2013	Cerro Tololo	D. E. Trilling, R. L. Allen	PHO	670 m	MPC · JPL
817979	2013 AY_{161}	—	October 14, 2007	Mount Lemmon	Mount Lemmon Survey	·	1.4 km	MPC · JPL
817980	2013 AP_{163}	—	September 8, 2011	Kitt Peak	Spacewatch	·	2.0 km	MPC · JPL
817981	2013 AV_{168}	—	January 4, 2013	Cerro Tololo	D. E. Trilling, R. L. Allen	·	1.9 km	MPC · JPL
817982	2013 AN_{171}	—	January 20, 2013	Mount Lemmon	Mount Lemmon Survey	·	850 m	MPC · JPL
817983	2013 AB_{172}	—	January 4, 2013	Cerro Tololo	D. E. Trilling, R. L. Allen	ADE	1.3 km	MPC · JPL
817984	2013 AW_{174}	—	January 4, 2013	Cerro Tololo	D. E. Trilling, R. L. Allen	·	1.2 km	MPC · JPL
817985	2013 AX_{176}	—	January 5, 2013	Cerro Tololo	D. E. Trilling, R. L. Allen	·	1.7 km	MPC · JPL
817986	2013 AK_{181}	—	January 5, 2013	Cerro Tololo	D. E. Trilling, R. L. Allen	EOS	1 km	MPC · JPL
817987	2013 AN_{186}	—	January 5, 2013	Mount Lemmon	Mount Lemmon Survey	·	800 m	MPC · JPL
817988	2013 AQ_{188}	—	November 1, 2005	Catalina	CSS	·	620 m	MPC · JPL
817989	2013 AP_{190}	—	January 5, 2013	Mount Lemmon	Mount Lemmon Survey	·	960 m	MPC · JPL
817990	2013 AZ_{191}	—	January 10, 2013	Haleakala	Pan-STARRS 1	·	880 m	MPC · JPL
817991	2013 AZ_{192}	—	January 3, 2013	Mount Lemmon	Mount Lemmon Survey	·	2.0 km	MPC · JPL
817992	2013 AV_{193}	—	July 23, 2015	Haleakala	Pan-STARRS 1	·	810 m	MPC · JPL
817993	2013 AD_{194}	—	January 10, 2013	Mount Lemmon	Mount Lemmon Survey	T_{j} (2.96)	2.3 km	MPC · JPL
817994	2013 AB_{196}	—	January 3, 2013	Mount Lemmon	Mount Lemmon Survey	·	2.4 km	MPC · JPL
817995	2013 AL_{196}	—	January 10, 2013	Haleakala	Pan-STARRS 1	L4	5.7 km	MPC · JPL
817996	2013 AB_{197}	—	January 10, 2013	Haleakala	Pan-STARRS 1	·	1.3 km	MPC · JPL
817997	2013 AQ_{197}	—	January 10, 2013	Haleakala	Pan-STARRS 1	·	500 m	MPC · JPL
817998	2013 AY_{197}	—	January 10, 2013	Haleakala	Pan-STARRS 1	·	1.8 km	MPC · JPL
817999	2013 AO_{198}	—	January 10, 2013	Haleakala	Pan-STARRS 1	·	940 m	MPC · JPL
818000	2013 AR_{200}	—	January 3, 2013	Mount Lemmon	Mount Lemmon Survey	·	650 m	MPC · JPL

== Meaning of names ==
As minor planet discoveries are confirmed, they are given a permanent number by the IAU's Minor Planet Center (MPC), and the discoverers can then submit names for them, following the IAU's naming conventions. The list below concerns those minor planets in the specified number-range that have received names, and explains the meanings of those names.

Official naming citations of newly named small Solar System bodies are approved and published in a bulletin by IAU's Working Group for Small Bodies Nomenclature (WGSBN). Before May 2021, citations were published in MPC's Minor Planet Circulars for many decades. Recent citations can also be found on the JPL Small-Body Database (SBDB). Until his death in 2016, German astronomer Lutz D. Schmadel compiled these citations into the Dictionary of Minor Planet Names (DMP) and regularly updated the collection.

Based on Paul Herget's The Names of the Minor Planets, Schmadel also researched the unclear origin of numerous asteroids, most of which had been named prior to World War II. This article incorporates text from this source, which is in the public domain: SBDB New namings may only be added to this list below after official publication as the preannouncement of names is condemned. The WGSBN publishes a comprehensive guideline for the naming rules of non-cometary small Solar System bodies.

Named minor planet	Provisional	This minor planet was named for...	Ref · Catalog
817120 Andreirăzvan	2012 DZ_{42}	Andrei Răzvan, Romanian civil engineer and amateur astronomer.	IAU · 817120
