= 276P/Vorobjov =

Jupiter-family comet

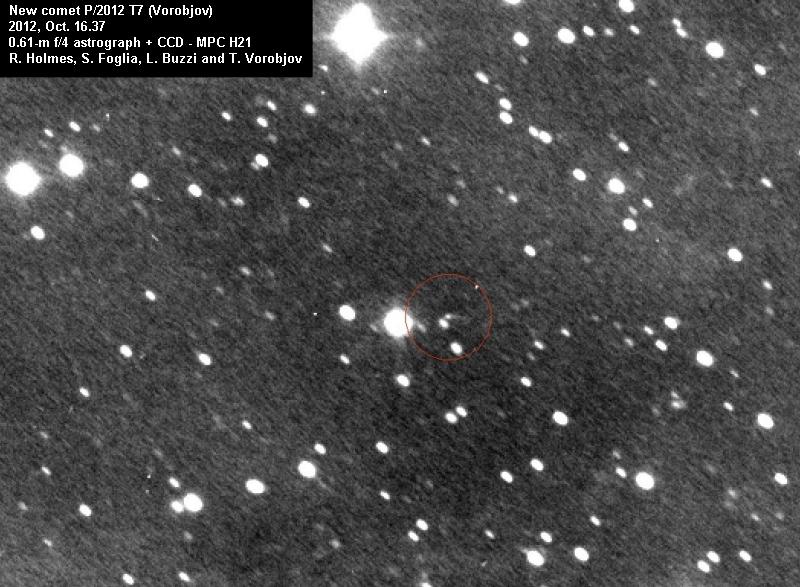
- Comet Vorobjov captured in a field of stars on 16 October 2012

Discovery
- Discovered by: Tomas Vorobjov
- Discovery site: Mount Lemmon SkyCenter (G84); 0.8-m Schulman Telescope
- Discovery date: 15 October 2012

Designations
- MPC designation: P/2012 T7
- Alternative designations: TOV7DD

Orbital characteristics
- Epoch: 21 November 2025 (JD 2461000.5)
- Observation arc: 25.17 years (Note: Observation arc from the Minor Planet Center database covering dates from 19 December 2000 until 19 February 2026.)
- Earliest precovery date: 19 January 2000
- Number of observations: 1,273
- Aphelion: 6.866 AU
- Perihelion: 3.899 AU
- Semi-major axis: 5.382 AU
- Eccentricity: 0.27568
- Orbital period: 12.487 years
- Inclination: 14.742°
- Longitude of ascending node: 211.06°
- Argument of periapsis: 199.66°
- Mean anomaly: 27.155°
- Last perihelion: 10 December 2024
- Next perihelion: 26 April 2037
- T_{Jupiter}: 2.862
- Earth MOID: 2.912 AU
- Jupiter MOID: 0.986 AU
- Comet total magnitude (M1): 11.0
- Comet nuclear magnitude (M2): 14.0

276P/Vorobjov, previously known as P/2012 T7 (Vorobjov), is a Jupiter-family comet discovered on 15 October 2012 by Tomáš Vorobjov on three 120-s images taken remotely using the 0.81-m f/7 Ritchey-Chretien Schulman Telescope located at the Mt. Lemmon SkyCenter via the Sierra Stars Observatory Network in the course of a minor-planet search survey undertaken as part of the International Astronomical Search Collaboration (IASC) school campaigns. After posting on the Minor Planet Center's NEOCP webpage, other observers have commented on the object's cometary appearance. The discovery was announced by the Minor Planet Center on 18 October, three days after the discovery.

== Observational history ==
=== Prediscovery ===
On 29 December 2012, Robert Matson (Newport Coast, CA, USA) has identified NEAT observations of this comet obtained with the Palomar 1.2m Schmidt telescope between 19 December 2000 and 20 January 2001, and Gareth V. Williams (MPC) has confirmed the identity; Williams then identified prediscovery observations acquired by Andrea Boattini at Mount Lemmon (G96) on 1 November 2011 in incidental astrometry sent to the Minor Planet Center, when the object's magnitude was measured as being 21.1–21.8.

=== Confirmation ===
A confirmation set of images was taken by R. Holmes the following night with a 0.61-m f/4 astrograph from Westfield, IL (H21) and showed a 6″ coma and a tail 25″ long in PA 260°. Due to its cometary appearance, the object was posted on the NEO Confirmation Page under the temporary designation TOV7DD.

== Gallery ==
Discovery sequence animation

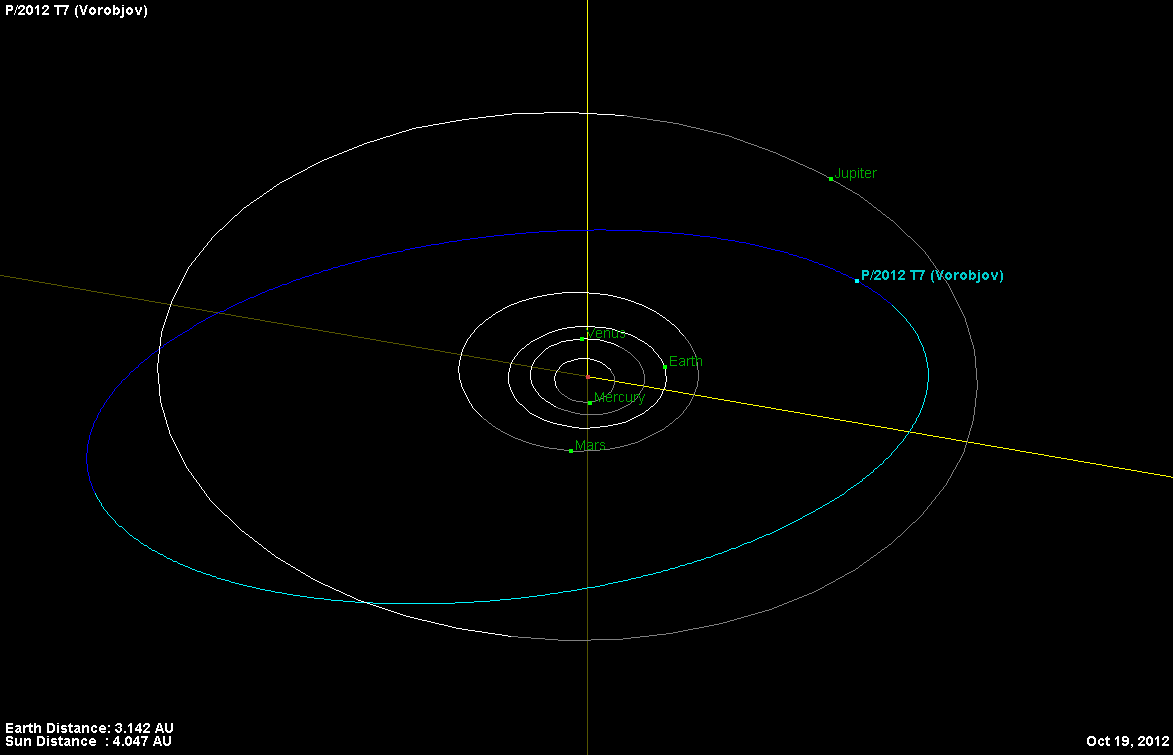
Preliminary orbit diagram based on observations between 15-18 Octobter 2012

== Notes ==
Numbered comets
Previous; 275P/Hermann	276P/Vorobjov	Next; 277P/LINEAR
