= Tomáš Vorobjov =

Slovak astronomer

Numbered minor planet discoveries: 10
| 239792 Hankakováčová | 9 March 2010 | list |
| 347028 Važec | 13 March 2010 | list |
| 590739 Miloslavov | 12 September 2012 | list |
| 400881 Vladimirdolinay | 7 August 2010 | list |
| (362559) 2010 VK_{41} | 13 October 2010 | list^{[A]} |
| (432457) 2010 CU_{127} | 13 February 2010 | list |
| (432949) 2012 HH2 | 19 April 2012 | list |
| (445309) 2010 EK_{42} | 12 March 2010 | list |
| 554268 Marksylvester | 26 September 2012 | list |
Co-discovery made with:^{A} R. Holmes

Tomáš Vorobjov (Slovak pronunciation: [ˈtɔmaːʂ ˈʋɔrɔbjɔw]; born 1984) is a Slovak amateur astronomer and an observer and discoverer of minor planets, in particular near-Earth objects.

He is the director of the IASC Data Reduction Team and is credited by the Minor Planet Center with the discovery of 9 numbered minor planets.

In October 2012, Vorobjov discovered 276P/Vorobjov, a periodic comet and his first comet discovery. He also discovered the trans-Neptunian object (TNO) (432949) 2012 HH2 in April 2012.

The Florian main-belt asteroid 4858 Vorobjov, discovered by American astronomer James Gibson at Palomar in 1985, was named after him.

== Discoveries ==
=== Near-Earth objects ===
- 2011 EB7 (Mar 1, 2011)
- 2011 HD63 (May 1, 2011)
- 2011 PW6 (Aug 8, 2011)
- 2013 EP41 (Mar 9, 2013)
- 2013 FC11 (Mar 21, 2013)
- 2014 FG33 (Mar 26, 2014)
- 2014 GF45 (Apr 6, 2014)
- 2014 QP362 (Aug 26, 2014)
- 2014 WG70 (Nov 17, 2014)

=== Centaurs ===
- 2013 GY54 (Mar 8, 2013)
- 2015 FK37 (Mar 20, 2015)

=== TNOs ===
- (432949) 2012 HH_{2} (Apr 19, 2012)
- 2014 FP43 (Mar 28, 2014)
- 2014 GE45 (Apr 6, 2014)
- 2014 QF433 (Aug 26, 2014)
- 2014 UH192 (Oct 28, 2014)
- 2014 WT69 (Nov 17, 2014)
- TVPS8GA (Nov 20, 2014) - lost
- 2015 FP36 (Mar 19, 2015)
