= List of minor planets: 651001–652000 =

The following is a partial list of minor planets, running from minor-planet number 651001 through 652000, inclusive. The primary data for this and other partial lists is based on JPL's "Small-Body Orbital Elements" and data available from the Minor Planet Center. Critical list information is also provided by the MPC, unless otherwise specified from Lowell Observatory. A detailed description of the table's columns and additional sources are given on the main page including a complete list of every page in this series, and a statistical break-up on the dynamical classification of minor planets.

Also see the summary list of all named bodies in numerical and alphabetical order, and the corresponding naming citations for the number range of this particular list. New namings may only be added to this list after official publication, as the preannouncement of names is condemned by the Working Group for Small Bodies Nomenclature of the International Astronomical Union.

Near-Earth obj.	MBA (inner)	MBA (outer)	Centaur
Mars-crosser	MBA (middle)	Jupiter trojan	Trans-Neptunian obj.
Unclassified

== 651001–651100 ==
Designation			Discovery			Properties		Ref
Permanent	Provisional	Named after	Date	Site	Discoverer(s)	Category	Diam.	Ref
651001	2012 UW_{184}	—	October 19, 2012	Mayhill-ISON	L. Elenin	EOS	1.7 km	MPC · JPL
651002	2012 UG_{185}	—	October 28, 2005	Kitt Peak	Spacewatch	3:2	5.6 km	MPC · JPL
651003	2012 UP_{185}	—	September 29, 1973	Palomar	C. J. van Houten, I. van Houten-Groeneveld, T. Gehrels	·	1.7 km	MPC · JPL
651004	2012 UT_{185}	—	October 21, 2012	Haleakala	Pan-STARRS 1	·	1.5 km	MPC · JPL
651005	2012 UC_{188}	—	October 16, 2012	Mount Lemmon	Mount Lemmon Survey	·	2.2 km	MPC · JPL
651006	2012 UM_{188}	—	October 19, 2012	Haleakala	Pan-STARRS 1	·	1.6 km	MPC · JPL
651007	2012 UC_{194}	—	October 22, 2012	Mount Lemmon	Mount Lemmon Survey	·	2.7 km	MPC · JPL
651008	2012 UJ_{194}	—	October 23, 2012	Haleakala	Pan-STARRS 1	·	1.8 km	MPC · JPL
651009	2012 UY_{198}	—	October 17, 2012	Mount Lemmon	Mount Lemmon Survey	·	1.7 km	MPC · JPL
651010	2012 UZ_{205}	—	December 1, 2016	Mount Lemmon	Mount Lemmon Survey	PHO	810 m	MPC · JPL
651011	2012 UU_{210}	—	October 17, 2012	Mount Lemmon	Mount Lemmon Survey	·	2.5 km	MPC · JPL
651012	2012 UX_{210}	—	October 18, 2012	Haleakala	Pan-STARRS 1	·	600 m	MPC · JPL
651013	2012 UU_{211}	—	October 16, 2012	Mount Lemmon	Mount Lemmon Survey	·	1.5 km	MPC · JPL
651014	2012 UZ_{211}	—	October 18, 2012	Haleakala	Pan-STARRS 1	·	1.8 km	MPC · JPL
651015	2012 UP_{212}	—	October 21, 2012	Haleakala	Pan-STARRS 1	·	1.7 km	MPC · JPL
651016	2012 UQ_{212}	—	October 18, 2012	Haleakala	Pan-STARRS 1	·	2.8 km	MPC · JPL
651017	2012 UV_{212}	—	October 22, 2012	Haleakala	Pan-STARRS 1	·	2.9 km	MPC · JPL
651018	2012 UY_{212}	—	October 17, 2012	Haleakala	Pan-STARRS 1	·	1.1 km	MPC · JPL
651019	2012 UZ_{212}	—	October 19, 2012	Haleakala	Pan-STARRS 1	·	2.3 km	MPC · JPL
651020	2012 UQ_{213}	—	October 16, 2012	Mount Lemmon	Mount Lemmon Survey	·	1.1 km	MPC · JPL
651021	2012 UF_{214}	—	October 18, 2012	Haleakala	Pan-STARRS 1	·	1.7 km	MPC · JPL
651022	2012 UP_{215}	—	October 11, 2012	Haleakala	Pan-STARRS 1	·	1.5 km	MPC · JPL
651023	2012 UC_{216}	—	October 27, 2012	Mount Lemmon	Mount Lemmon Survey	HYG	2.1 km	MPC · JPL
651024	2012 UO_{216}	—	October 19, 2012	Haleakala	Pan-STARRS 1	H	400 m	MPC · JPL
651025	2012 UH_{219}	—	October 18, 2012	Haleakala	Pan-STARRS 1	·	1.7 km	MPC · JPL
651026	2012 UL_{226}	—	October 18, 2012	Haleakala	Pan-STARRS 1	MAS	480 m	MPC · JPL
651027	2012 UU_{227}	—	October 20, 2012	Mount Lemmon	Mount Lemmon Survey	·	980 m	MPC · JPL
651028	2012 UZ_{227}	—	October 17, 2012	Haleakala	Pan-STARRS 1	EOS	1.3 km	MPC · JPL
651029	2012 UQ_{228}	—	October 18, 2012	Haleakala	Pan-STARRS 1	·	2.2 km	MPC · JPL
651030	2012 UV_{229}	—	October 20, 2012	Haleakala	Pan-STARRS 1	·	2.2 km	MPC · JPL
651031	2012 UR_{231}	—	April 25, 2003	Kitt Peak	Spacewatch	H	330 m	MPC · JPL
651032	2012 UO_{232}	—	October 22, 2012	Mount Lemmon	Mount Lemmon Survey	EOS	1.4 km	MPC · JPL
651033	2012 UX_{232}	—	October 20, 2012	Mount Lemmon	Mount Lemmon Survey	·	2.5 km	MPC · JPL
651034	2012 UO_{233}	—	October 17, 2012	Haleakala	Pan-STARRS 1	·	2.1 km	MPC · JPL
651035	2012 UA_{234}	—	October 23, 2012	Mount Lemmon	Mount Lemmon Survey	·	1.6 km	MPC · JPL
651036	2012 UC_{238}	—	October 21, 2012	Haleakala	Pan-STARRS 1	·	1.6 km	MPC · JPL
651037	2012 UZ_{238}	—	October 20, 2012	Mount Lemmon	Mount Lemmon Survey	·	2.2 km	MPC · JPL
651038	2012 UM_{241}	—	December 4, 2007	Mount Lemmon	Mount Lemmon Survey	·	2.6 km	MPC · JPL
651039	2012 UN_{241}	—	October 19, 2012	Mount Lemmon	Mount Lemmon Survey	·	2.4 km	MPC · JPL
651040	2012 UM_{242}	—	October 21, 2012	Kitt Peak	Spacewatch	·	3.5 km	MPC · JPL
651041	2012 US_{246}	—	October 17, 2012	Mount Lemmon	Mount Lemmon Survey	·	2.1 km	MPC · JPL
651042	2012 UK_{247}	—	October 22, 2012	Haleakala	Pan-STARRS 1	·	2.4 km	MPC · JPL
651043	2012 UW_{249}	—	October 18, 2012	Haleakala	Pan-STARRS 1	·	2.0 km	MPC · JPL
651044	2012 UP_{250}	—	October 19, 2012	Haleakala	Pan-STARRS 1	·	2.3 km	MPC · JPL
651045	2012 VG	—	October 26, 2012	Mount Lemmon	Mount Lemmon Survey	·	2.0 km	MPC · JPL
651046	2012 VX	—	April 8, 2003	Kitt Peak	Spacewatch	·	3.5 km	MPC · JPL
651047	2012 VM_{1}	—	November 2, 2012	Haleakala	Pan-STARRS 1	·	1.6 km	MPC · JPL
651048	2012 VT_{1}	—	November 2, 2012	Haleakala	Pan-STARRS 1	H	480 m	MPC · JPL
651049	2012 VF_{2}	—	February 27, 2008	Vail-Jarnac	Jarnac	H	530 m	MPC · JPL
651050	2012 VT_{2}	—	August 19, 2001	Cerro Tololo	Deep Ecliptic Survey	·	1.4 km	MPC · JPL
651051	2012 VK_{7}	—	March 10, 2011	Kitt Peak	Spacewatch	H	430 m	MPC · JPL
651052	2012 VJ_{8}	—	October 20, 2012	Kitt Peak	Spacewatch	·	2.3 km	MPC · JPL
651053	2012 VL_{8}	—	September 19, 2012	Mount Lemmon	Mount Lemmon Survey	·	2.1 km	MPC · JPL
651054	2012 VO_{8}	—	October 9, 2007	Mount Lemmon	Mount Lemmon Survey	·	1.6 km	MPC · JPL
651055	2012 VP_{8}	—	November 3, 2012	Mount Lemmon	Mount Lemmon Survey	TIR	2.0 km	MPC · JPL
651056	2012 VZ_{11}	—	September 16, 2012	Mount Lemmon	Mount Lemmon Survey	·	1.5 km	MPC · JPL
651057	2012 VL_{15}	—	October 26, 2012	Mount Lemmon	Mount Lemmon Survey	EOS	1.5 km	MPC · JPL
651058	2012 VG_{16}	—	September 25, 2003	Palomar	NEAT	·	2.0 km	MPC · JPL
651059	2012 VJ_{18}	—	December 8, 2005	Kitt Peak	Spacewatch	·	590 m	MPC · JPL
651060	2012 VK_{22}	—	November 7, 2007	Kitt Peak	Spacewatch	·	1.3 km	MPC · JPL
651061	2012 VV_{24}	—	October 8, 2012	Kitt Peak	Spacewatch	·	1.2 km	MPC · JPL
651062	2012 VM_{26}	—	March 15, 2009	Mount Lemmon	Mount Lemmon Survey	·	2.1 km	MPC · JPL
651063	2012 VE_{27}	—	September 16, 2012	Mount Lemmon	Mount Lemmon Survey	·	720 m	MPC · JPL
651064	2012 VQ_{28}	—	October 22, 2012	Kitt Peak	Spacewatch	·	1.8 km	MPC · JPL
651065	2012 VN_{29}	—	September 21, 2012	Mount Lemmon	Mount Lemmon Survey	·	2.5 km	MPC · JPL
651066	2012 VQ_{31}	—	November 5, 2012	Haleakala	Pan-STARRS 1	LIX	2.5 km	MPC · JPL
651067	2012 VC_{32}	—	April 10, 2005	Kitt Peak	Deep Ecliptic Survey	THM	1.9 km	MPC · JPL
651068	2012 VG_{33}	—	October 17, 2012	Mount Lemmon	Mount Lemmon Survey	·	1.8 km	MPC · JPL
651069	2012 VM_{34}	—	January 27, 2006	Mount Lemmon	Mount Lemmon Survey	·	1.2 km	MPC · JPL
651070	2012 VT_{34}	—	October 20, 2007	Mount Lemmon	Mount Lemmon Survey	·	1.6 km	MPC · JPL
651071	2012 VA_{43}	—	October 18, 2001	Palomar	NEAT	·	2.1 km	MPC · JPL
651072	2012 VE_{43}	—	November 6, 2012	Mount Lemmon	Mount Lemmon Survey	·	1.8 km	MPC · JPL
651073	2012 VW_{45}	—	December 20, 2007	Kitt Peak	Spacewatch	·	2.6 km	MPC · JPL
651074	2012 VC_{49}	—	September 15, 2007	Kitt Peak	Spacewatch	KOR	1.3 km	MPC · JPL
651075	2012 VZ_{51}	—	November 6, 2012	Kitt Peak	Spacewatch	·	670 m	MPC · JPL
651076	2012 VL_{52}	—	May 14, 2005	Mount Lemmon	Mount Lemmon Survey	·	2.5 km	MPC · JPL
651077	2012 VK_{54}	—	November 6, 2012	Mount Lemmon	Mount Lemmon Survey	EOS	1.4 km	MPC · JPL
651078	2012 VT_{54}	—	September 23, 2012	Mount Lemmon	Mount Lemmon Survey	MAS	590 m	MPC · JPL
651079	2012 VK_{55}	—	November 6, 2012	Mount Lemmon	Mount Lemmon Survey	·	1.9 km	MPC · JPL
651080	2012 VS_{55}	—	November 6, 2012	Mount Lemmon	Mount Lemmon Survey	·	2.6 km	MPC · JPL
651081	2012 VU_{55}	—	August 27, 2005	Palomar	NEAT	·	540 m	MPC · JPL
651082	2012 VJ_{58}	—	October 21, 2012	Haleakala	Pan-STARRS 1	HYG	2.1 km	MPC · JPL
651083	2012 VZ_{59}	—	October 21, 2012	Haleakala	Pan-STARRS 1	·	2.3 km	MPC · JPL
651084	2012 VR_{61}	—	September 17, 1995	Kitt Peak	Spacewatch	THM	1.8 km	MPC · JPL
651085	2012 VZ_{61}	—	October 21, 2012	Haleakala	Pan-STARRS 1	·	2.9 km	MPC · JPL
651086	2012 VY_{62}	—	September 17, 2006	Kitt Peak	Spacewatch	·	2.2 km	MPC · JPL
651087	2012 VZ_{62}	—	November 12, 2012	Mount Lemmon	Mount Lemmon Survey	·	1.5 km	MPC · JPL
651088	2012 VQ_{65}	—	October 25, 2005	Mount Lemmon	Mount Lemmon Survey	NYS	820 m	MPC · JPL
651089	2012 VV_{65}	—	November 7, 2012	Kitt Peak	Spacewatch	·	2.6 km	MPC · JPL
651090	2012 VO_{67}	—	October 19, 1995	Kitt Peak	Spacewatch	LIX	2.6 km	MPC · JPL
651091	2012 VY_{67}	—	October 20, 2012	Kitt Peak	Spacewatch	·	2.3 km	MPC · JPL
651092	2012 VZ_{67}	—	September 29, 2003	Kitt Peak	Spacewatch	·	1.4 km	MPC · JPL
651093	2012 VH_{68}	—	July 4, 2005	Palomar	NEAT	·	680 m	MPC · JPL
651094	2012 VF_{69}	—	October 21, 2012	Nogales	M. Schwartz, P. R. Holvorcem	·	1.6 km	MPC · JPL
651095	2012 VL_{69}	—	October 17, 2012	Mount Lemmon	Mount Lemmon Survey	HYG	2.1 km	MPC · JPL
651096	2012 VW_{70}	—	November 12, 2007	Mount Lemmon	Mount Lemmon Survey	·	3.2 km	MPC · JPL
651097	2012 VE_{74}	—	October 15, 2012	Mount Lemmon SkyCe	T. Vorobjov, Kostin, A.	·	2.2 km	MPC · JPL
651098	2012 VF_{79}	—	August 19, 2006	Kitt Peak	Spacewatch	·	1.7 km	MPC · JPL
651099	2012 VU_{79}	—	October 21, 2012	Haleakala	Pan-STARRS 1	·	780 m	MPC · JPL
651100	2012 VM_{80}	—	November 8, 2007	Kitt Peak	Spacewatch	INA	2.3 km	MPC · JPL

== 651101–651200 ==
back to top

Designation			Discovery			Properties		Ref
Permanent	Provisional	Named after	Date	Site	Discoverer(s)	Category	Diam.	Ref
651101	2012 VP_{80}	—	September 23, 2008	Mount Lemmon	Mount Lemmon Survey	V	520 m	MPC · JPL
651102	2012 VL_{83}	—	November 4, 2012	Mount Lemmon	Mount Lemmon Survey	MAS	440 m	MPC · JPL
651103	2012 VY_{85}	—	November 14, 2012	Ka-Dar	Gerke, V.	·	2.4 km	MPC · JPL
651104 Bobola	2012 VY_{87}	Bobola	November 14, 2012	Mount Graham	K. Černis, R. P. Boyle	·	720 m	MPC · JPL
651105	2012 VS_{88}	—	November 1, 2007	Kitt Peak	Spacewatch	EOS	1.5 km	MPC · JPL
651106	2012 VH_{89}	—	October 21, 2012	Haleakala	Pan-STARRS 1	·	850 m	MPC · JPL
651107	2012 VM_{89}	—	October 21, 2012	Haleakala	Pan-STARRS 1	·	1.7 km	MPC · JPL
651108	2012 VZ_{90}	—	October 7, 2008	Kitt Peak	Spacewatch	·	990 m	MPC · JPL
651109	2012 VC_{92}	—	October 26, 2012	Mount Lemmon	Mount Lemmon Survey	LIX	2.3 km	MPC · JPL
651110	2012 VR_{94}	—	November 13, 2012	Mount Lemmon	Mount Lemmon Survey	·	1.9 km	MPC · JPL
651111	2012 VC_{98}	—	November 11, 2001	Ondřejov	P. Pravec, P. Kušnirák	TIR	2.9 km	MPC · JPL
651112	2012 VP_{101}	—	November 20, 2001	Socorro	LINEAR	MAS	770 m	MPC · JPL
651113	2012 VR_{103}	—	October 22, 2012	Kitt Peak	Spacewatch	·	2.2 km	MPC · JPL
651114	2012 VY_{103}	—	November 7, 2012	Haleakala	Pan-STARRS 1	·	950 m	MPC · JPL
651115	2012 VF_{105}	—	September 26, 2001	Socorro	LINEAR	·	2.7 km	MPC · JPL
651116	2012 VT_{106}	—	October 14, 2012	Kitt Peak	Spacewatch	·	1.3 km	MPC · JPL
651117	2012 VJ_{108}	—	October 21, 2012	Haleakala	Pan-STARRS 1	·	2.2 km	MPC · JPL
651118	2012 VA_{109}	—	October 22, 2012	Haleakala	Pan-STARRS 1	·	870 m	MPC · JPL
651119	2012 VK_{109}	—	November 13, 2012	Mount Lemmon	Mount Lemmon Survey	·	1.3 km	MPC · JPL
651120	2012 VD_{110}	—	October 22, 2012	Catalina	CSS	·	1.5 km	MPC · JPL
651121	2012 VC_{111}	—	October 17, 2012	Mount Lemmon	Mount Lemmon Survey	·	1.7 km	MPC · JPL
651122	2012 VC_{112}	—	December 30, 2007	Mount Lemmon	Mount Lemmon Survey	·	2.8 km	MPC · JPL
651123	2012 VX_{114}	—	November 7, 2012	Kitt Peak	Spacewatch	·	2.0 km	MPC · JPL
651124	2012 VX_{115}	—	November 7, 2012	Mount Lemmon	Mount Lemmon Survey	·	1.5 km	MPC · JPL
651125	2012 VL_{116}	—	August 22, 2017	Haleakala	Pan-STARRS 1	EOS	1.5 km	MPC · JPL
651126	2012 VN_{117}	—	November 7, 2012	Nogales	M. Schwartz, P. R. Holvorcem	·	2.4 km	MPC · JPL
651127	2012 VJ_{118}	—	December 1, 2014	Haleakala	Pan-STARRS 1	·	2.9 km	MPC · JPL
651128	2012 VK_{118}	—	October 9, 2007	Mount Lemmon	Mount Lemmon Survey	·	1.9 km	MPC · JPL
651129	2012 VR_{118}	—	August 21, 2006	Kitt Peak	Spacewatch	·	1.7 km	MPC · JPL
651130	2012 VS_{119}	—	March 25, 2015	Mount Lemmon	Mount Lemmon Survey	EOS	1.6 km	MPC · JPL
651131	2012 VB_{120}	—	November 15, 2012	Mount Lemmon	Mount Lemmon Survey	·	2.2 km	MPC · JPL
651132	2012 VU_{120}	—	November 6, 2012	Mount Lemmon	Mount Lemmon Survey	EOS	1.6 km	MPC · JPL
651133	2012 VB_{122}	—	November 6, 2012	Kitt Peak	Spacewatch	LIX	2.7 km	MPC · JPL
651134	2012 VR_{123}	—	November 8, 2012	Haleakala	Pan-STARRS 1	·	2.0 km	MPC · JPL
651135	2012 VF_{125}	—	November 8, 2018	Mount Lemmon	Mount Lemmon Survey	·	3.2 km	MPC · JPL
651136	2012 VN_{127}	—	November 13, 2012	Mount Lemmon	Mount Lemmon Survey	·	2.8 km	MPC · JPL
651137	2012 VF_{128}	—	November 4, 2012	Kitt Peak	Spacewatch	·	2.3 km	MPC · JPL
651138	2012 VF_{129}	—	November 5, 2012	Kitt Peak	Spacewatch	·	3.0 km	MPC · JPL
651139	2012 VJ_{131}	—	November 7, 2012	Mount Lemmon	Mount Lemmon Survey	·	1.4 km	MPC · JPL
651140	2012 VW_{133}	—	April 9, 2010	Kitt Peak	Spacewatch	·	3.0 km	MPC · JPL
651141	2012 VO_{142}	—	November 6, 2012	Mount Lemmon	Mount Lemmon Survey	·	2.5 km	MPC · JPL
651142	2012 WF_{2}	—	November 17, 2012	Mount Lemmon	Mount Lemmon Survey	·	1.4 km	MPC · JPL
651143	2012 WT_{3}	—	November 6, 2012	Nogales	M. Schwartz, P. R. Holvorcem	H	500 m	MPC · JPL
651144	2012 WA_{5}	—	November 10, 2004	Kitt Peak	Spacewatch	3:2	4.8 km	MPC · JPL
651145	2012 WG_{6}	—	November 5, 2012	Kitt Peak	Spacewatch	·	1.2 km	MPC · JPL
651146	2012 WM_{6}	—	November 17, 2012	Kitt Peak	Spacewatch	·	2.0 km	MPC · JPL
651147	2012 WR_{7}	—	October 14, 2012	Kitt Peak	Spacewatch	·	2.3 km	MPC · JPL
651148	2012 WM_{9}	—	October 17, 2003	Apache Point	SDSS Collaboration	EUN	1.2 km	MPC · JPL
651149	2012 WW_{11}	—	November 19, 2012	Kitt Peak	Spacewatch	·	1.5 km	MPC · JPL
651150	2012 WV_{12}	—	April 10, 2010	Mount Lemmon	Mount Lemmon Survey	HOF	2.1 km	MPC · JPL
651151	2012 WC_{16}	—	November 20, 2012	Mount Lemmon	Mount Lemmon Survey	·	2.5 km	MPC · JPL
651152	2012 WK_{16}	—	November 14, 2012	Kitt Peak	Spacewatch	·	2.2 km	MPC · JPL
651153	2012 WN_{17}	—	November 3, 2012	Haleakala	Pan-STARRS 1	PHO	1.0 km	MPC · JPL
651154	2012 WW_{18}	—	November 20, 2007	Kitt Peak	Spacewatch	·	2.4 km	MPC · JPL
651155	2012 WO_{29}	—	November 23, 2012	Kitt Peak	Spacewatch	VER	2.2 km	MPC · JPL
651156	2012 WK_{30}	—	November 7, 2012	Haleakala	Pan-STARRS 1	·	2.1 km	MPC · JPL
651157	2012 WY_{30}	—	November 7, 2012	Haleakala	Pan-STARRS 1	THM	1.5 km	MPC · JPL
651158	2012 WA_{31}	—	November 17, 2012	Mount Lemmon	Mount Lemmon Survey	KOR	1.2 km	MPC · JPL
651159	2012 WG_{31}	—	November 17, 2012	Mount Lemmon	Mount Lemmon Survey	·	2.0 km	MPC · JPL
651160	2012 WH_{35}	—	November 25, 2012	Nogales	M. Schwartz, P. R. Holvorcem	·	1.9 km	MPC · JPL
651161	2012 WA_{37}	—	November 23, 2012	Kitt Peak	Spacewatch	EOS	1.4 km	MPC · JPL
651162	2012 WJ_{38}	—	February 4, 2003	La Silla	Barbieri, C.	·	1.3 km	MPC · JPL
651163	2012 WA_{39}	—	November 19, 2012	Kitt Peak	Spacewatch	·	2.5 km	MPC · JPL
651164	2012 WB_{39}	—	November 19, 2012	Kitt Peak	Spacewatch	·	740 m	MPC · JPL
651165	2012 WN_{40}	—	November 22, 2012	Kitt Peak	Spacewatch	·	760 m	MPC · JPL
651166	2012 WU_{40}	—	November 22, 2012	Kitt Peak	Spacewatch	·	2.9 km	MPC · JPL
651167	2012 WV_{40}	—	November 23, 2012	Kitt Peak	Spacewatch	·	1.8 km	MPC · JPL
651168 Petrini	2012 WZ_{41}	Petrini	November 24, 2012	Mount Graham	K. Černis, R. P. Boyle	VER	2.2 km	MPC · JPL
651169	2012 WX_{42}	—	November 23, 2012	Kitt Peak	Spacewatch	·	2.8 km	MPC · JPL
651170	2012 WZ_{42}	—	November 24, 2012	Kitt Peak	Spacewatch	·	1.1 km	MPC · JPL
651171	2012 XN	—	June 4, 2010	Nogales	M. Schwartz, P. R. Holvorcem	·	3.0 km	MPC · JPL
651172	2012 XL_{3}	—	December 3, 2012	Mount Lemmon	Mount Lemmon Survey	·	830 m	MPC · JPL
651173	2012 XV_{3}	—	December 3, 2012	Mount Lemmon	Mount Lemmon Survey	·	3.1 km	MPC · JPL
651174	2012 XY_{7}	—	December 31, 2008	Mount Lemmon	Mount Lemmon Survey	·	1.9 km	MPC · JPL
651175	2012 XU_{8}	—	March 7, 2003	Kitt Peak	Deep Lens Survey	EOS	2.4 km	MPC · JPL
651176	2012 XY_{8}	—	November 23, 2012	Kitt Peak	Spacewatch	·	1.6 km	MPC · JPL
651177	2012 XR_{9}	—	October 22, 2012	Haleakala	Pan-STARRS 1	THM	1.6 km	MPC · JPL
651178	2012 XJ_{12}	—	September 28, 2008	Catalina	CSS	·	1.2 km	MPC · JPL
651179	2012 XP_{12}	—	November 14, 2012	Mount Lemmon	Mount Lemmon Survey	·	820 m	MPC · JPL
651180	2012 XS_{12}	—	November 14, 2012	Mount Lemmon	Mount Lemmon Survey	·	1.9 km	MPC · JPL
651181	2012 XR_{13}	—	December 5, 2012	Mount Lemmon	Mount Lemmon Survey	HYG	2.4 km	MPC · JPL
651182	2012 XH_{15}	—	December 5, 2012	Mount Lemmon	Mount Lemmon Survey	EOS	1.5 km	MPC · JPL
651183	2012 XN_{15}	—	December 5, 2012	Mount Lemmon	Mount Lemmon Survey	·	2.6 km	MPC · JPL
651184	2012 XA_{17}	—	December 7, 2012	Haleakala	Pan-STARRS 1	PHO	1.0 km	MPC · JPL
651185	2012 XP_{21}	—	November 22, 2012	Kitt Peak	Spacewatch	·	1.5 km	MPC · JPL
651186	2012 XZ_{21}	—	January 11, 2008	Kitt Peak	Spacewatch	THM	1.7 km	MPC · JPL
651187	2012 XR_{22}	—	December 2, 2012	Mount Lemmon	Mount Lemmon Survey	EOS	1.9 km	MPC · JPL
651188	2012 XC_{24}	—	December 3, 2012	Mount Lemmon	Mount Lemmon Survey	·	1.4 km	MPC · JPL
651189	2012 XH_{25}	—	October 13, 2006	Kitt Peak	Spacewatch	VER	2.5 km	MPC · JPL
651190	2012 XE_{26}	—	December 3, 2012	Mount Lemmon	Mount Lemmon Survey	URS	3.1 km	MPC · JPL
651191	2012 XM_{26}	—	December 5, 2007	Kitt Peak	Spacewatch	·	1.6 km	MPC · JPL
651192	2012 XD_{28}	—	November 7, 2012	Mount Lemmon	Mount Lemmon Survey	·	2.1 km	MPC · JPL
651193	2012 XE_{28}	—	July 28, 2011	Haleakala	Pan-STARRS 1	·	1.6 km	MPC · JPL
651194	2012 XD_{31}	—	October 3, 2006	Mount Lemmon	Mount Lemmon Survey	·	2.8 km	MPC · JPL
651195	2012 XL_{31}	—	August 30, 2011	Haleakala	Pan-STARRS 1	·	2.0 km	MPC · JPL
651196	2012 XZ_{32}	—	December 3, 2012	Mount Lemmon	Mount Lemmon Survey	·	1.5 km	MPC · JPL
651197	2012 XC_{34}	—	December 3, 2012	Mount Lemmon	Mount Lemmon Survey	·	690 m	MPC · JPL
651198	2012 XN_{34}	—	October 20, 2012	Nogales	M. Schwartz, P. R. Holvorcem	·	2.3 km	MPC · JPL
651199	2012 XO_{38}	—	September 26, 2003	Apache Point	SDSS Collaboration	·	1.3 km	MPC · JPL
651200	2012 XO_{39}	—	November 12, 2012	Mount Lemmon	Mount Lemmon Survey	·	1.6 km	MPC · JPL

== 651201–651300 ==
back to top

Designation			Discovery			Properties		Ref
Permanent	Provisional	Named after	Date	Site	Discoverer(s)	Category	Diam.	Ref
651201	2012 XU_{39}	—	November 6, 2012	Kitt Peak	Spacewatch	EOS	1.5 km	MPC · JPL
651202	2012 XJ_{40}	—	September 4, 2008	Kitt Peak	Spacewatch	·	900 m	MPC · JPL
651203	2012 XX_{40}	—	December 17, 2007	Mount Lemmon	Mount Lemmon Survey	·	2.0 km	MPC · JPL
651204	2012 XY_{40}	—	December 3, 2012	Mount Lemmon	Mount Lemmon Survey	·	1.5 km	MPC · JPL
651205	2012 XG_{42}	—	December 3, 2012	Mount Lemmon	Mount Lemmon Survey	·	2.7 km	MPC · JPL
651206	2012 XO_{42}	—	November 12, 2012	Kitt Peak	Spacewatch	·	1.9 km	MPC · JPL
651207	2012 XD_{43}	—	December 3, 2012	Mount Lemmon	Mount Lemmon Survey	·	2.4 km	MPC · JPL
651208	2012 XJ_{43}	—	October 18, 2001	Palomar	NEAT	MAS	560 m	MPC · JPL
651209	2012 XT_{43}	—	December 4, 2007	Kitt Peak	Spacewatch	·	1.8 km	MPC · JPL
651210	2012 XP_{44}	—	December 3, 2012	Mount Lemmon	Mount Lemmon Survey	·	890 m	MPC · JPL
651211	2012 XH_{45}	—	August 27, 2006	Kitt Peak	Spacewatch	·	1.5 km	MPC · JPL
651212	2012 XT_{46}	—	December 4, 2012	Mount Lemmon	Mount Lemmon Survey	·	3.2 km	MPC · JPL
651213	2012 XY_{46}	—	December 4, 2012	Mount Lemmon	Mount Lemmon Survey	·	1.6 km	MPC · JPL
651214	2012 XN_{48}	—	September 25, 2006	Mount Lemmon	Mount Lemmon Survey	·	1.8 km	MPC · JPL
651215	2012 XR_{49}	—	August 10, 2007	Kitt Peak	Spacewatch	AEO	1.2 km	MPC · JPL
651216	2012 XS_{49}	—	December 5, 2012	Oukaïmeden	C. Rinner	·	570 m	MPC · JPL
651217	2012 XW_{49}	—	November 7, 2012	Mount Lemmon	Mount Lemmon Survey	·	1.7 km	MPC · JPL
651218	2012 XZ_{50}	—	October 16, 2007	Mount Lemmon	Mount Lemmon Survey	·	2.1 km	MPC · JPL
651219	2012 XN_{52}	—	November 26, 2012	Mount Lemmon	Mount Lemmon Survey	·	3.1 km	MPC · JPL
651220	2012 XN_{56}	—	January 11, 2008	Catalina	CSS	EUP	3.5 km	MPC · JPL
651221	2012 XR_{56}	—	September 21, 2008	Mount Lemmon	Mount Lemmon Survey	NYS	880 m	MPC · JPL
651222	2012 XM_{57}	—	October 15, 2012	Mount Lemmon	Mount Lemmon Survey	·	1.8 km	MPC · JPL
651223	2012 XY_{61}	—	October 26, 2001	Kitt Peak	Spacewatch	·	1.6 km	MPC · JPL
651224	2012 XZ_{65}	—	December 4, 2012	Mount Lemmon	Mount Lemmon Survey	·	1.4 km	MPC · JPL
651225	2012 XM_{66}	—	December 4, 2012	Mount Lemmon	Mount Lemmon Survey	·	2.5 km	MPC · JPL
651226	2012 XW_{66}	—	October 19, 2006	Kitt Peak	Deep Ecliptic Survey	·	1.9 km	MPC · JPL
651227	2012 XP_{67}	—	April 11, 2002	Palomar	NEAT	·	1.5 km	MPC · JPL
651228	2012 XK_{72}	—	October 11, 2006	Palomar	NEAT	·	2.6 km	MPC · JPL
651229	2012 XD_{75}	—	December 6, 2012	Mount Lemmon	Mount Lemmon Survey	·	1.5 km	MPC · JPL
651230	2012 XW_{75}	—	November 4, 2012	Kitt Peak	Spacewatch	·	640 m	MPC · JPL
651231	2012 XG_{76}	—	January 7, 2006	Kitt Peak	Spacewatch	·	890 m	MPC · JPL
651232	2012 XC_{77}	—	December 6, 2012	Mount Lemmon	Mount Lemmon Survey	EOS	1.6 km	MPC · JPL
651233	2012 XE_{77}	—	October 23, 2012	Mount Lemmon	Mount Lemmon Survey	THM	1.7 km	MPC · JPL
651234	2012 XT_{79}	—	January 18, 2009	Kitt Peak	Spacewatch	HOF	2.1 km	MPC · JPL
651235	2012 XE_{80}	—	November 7, 2012	Haleakala	Pan-STARRS 1	·	1.9 km	MPC · JPL
651236	2012 XO_{80}	—	November 14, 2012	Mount Lemmon	Mount Lemmon Survey	·	1.7 km	MPC · JPL
651237	2012 XJ_{84}	—	December 23, 2001	Kitt Peak	Spacewatch	·	2.6 km	MPC · JPL
651238	2012 XL_{86}	—	December 8, 2012	Mount Lemmon	Mount Lemmon Survey	·	1.2 km	MPC · JPL
651239	2012 XQ_{87}	—	November 12, 2012	Mount Lemmon	Mount Lemmon Survey	·	1.3 km	MPC · JPL
651240	2012 XW_{88}	—	December 24, 2005	Kitt Peak	Spacewatch	MAS	390 m	MPC · JPL
651241	2012 XE_{89}	—	November 22, 2012	Kitt Peak	Spacewatch	THM	1.7 km	MPC · JPL
651242	2012 XK_{90}	—	October 11, 2007	Kitt Peak	Spacewatch	·	1.5 km	MPC · JPL
651243	2012 XO_{92}	—	December 8, 2012	Mount Lemmon	Mount Lemmon Survey	·	2.3 km	MPC · JPL
651244	2012 XT_{96}	—	November 13, 2012	Kitt Peak	Spacewatch	EOS	1.5 km	MPC · JPL
651245	2012 XL_{98}	—	June 19, 2010	Mount Lemmon	Mount Lemmon Survey	·	1.9 km	MPC · JPL
651246	2012 XS_{100}	—	December 5, 2012	Mount Lemmon	Mount Lemmon Survey	·	2.9 km	MPC · JPL
651247	2012 XY_{100}	—	September 30, 2006	Mount Lemmon	Mount Lemmon Survey	EOS	1.7 km	MPC · JPL
651248	2012 XD_{101}	—	October 1, 2011	Mount Lemmon	Mount Lemmon Survey	·	3.0 km	MPC · JPL
651249	2012 XE_{101}	—	December 18, 2007	Mount Lemmon	Mount Lemmon Survey	·	2.0 km	MPC · JPL
651250	2012 XN_{101}	—	December 5, 2012	Mount Lemmon	Mount Lemmon Survey	PHO	630 m	MPC · JPL
651251	2012 XV_{102}	—	December 5, 2012	Mount Lemmon	Mount Lemmon Survey	·	2.8 km	MPC · JPL
651252	2012 XK_{103}	—	December 4, 2008	Kitt Peak	Spacewatch	·	1.8 km	MPC · JPL
651253	2012 XR_{103}	—	September 3, 2008	Kitt Peak	Spacewatch	·	800 m	MPC · JPL
651254	2012 XB_{104}	—	November 15, 2012	Mount Lemmon	Mount Lemmon Survey	·	1.7 km	MPC · JPL
651255	2012 XV_{105}	—	December 7, 2012	Kitt Peak	Spacewatch	·	1.9 km	MPC · JPL
651256	2012 XZ_{106}	—	September 9, 2001	Haleakala	NEAT	·	3.2 km	MPC · JPL
651257	2012 XX_{107}	—	December 3, 2012	Mount Lemmon	Mount Lemmon Survey	·	1.4 km	MPC · JPL
651258	2012 XC_{111}	—	September 18, 2003	Palomar	NEAT	·	1.9 km	MPC · JPL
651259	2012 XR_{113}	—	April 29, 2006	Kitt Peak	Spacewatch	H	440 m	MPC · JPL
651260	2012 XS_{113}	—	October 8, 2012	Kitt Peak	Spacewatch	·	2.4 km	MPC · JPL
651261	2012 XD_{114}	—	December 30, 2007	Kitt Peak	Spacewatch	·	1.9 km	MPC · JPL
651262	2012 XL_{115}	—	May 24, 2001	Cerro Tololo	Deep Ecliptic Survey	AGN	1.1 km	MPC · JPL
651263	2012 XR_{115}	—	October 18, 2012	Haleakala	Pan-STARRS 1	·	1.7 km	MPC · JPL
651264	2012 XQ_{118}	—	December 8, 2012	Kitt Peak	Spacewatch	EUP	2.7 km	MPC · JPL
651265	2012 XD_{119}	—	December 8, 2012	Mount Lemmon	Mount Lemmon Survey	·	1.7 km	MPC · JPL
651266	2012 XG_{119}	—	February 2, 2009	Catalina	CSS	·	1.5 km	MPC · JPL
651267	2012 XM_{123}	—	December 9, 2012	Haleakala	Pan-STARRS 1	·	3.4 km	MPC · JPL
651268	2012 XT_{125}	—	July 3, 2005	Palomar	NEAT	EOS	2.7 km	MPC · JPL
651269	2012 XW_{125}	—	December 9, 2012	Haleakala	Pan-STARRS 1	LIX	2.5 km	MPC · JPL
651270	2012 XY_{125}	—	May 6, 2006	Kitt Peak	Spacewatch	·	1.7 km	MPC · JPL
651271	2012 XE_{127}	—	November 7, 2012	Mount Lemmon	Mount Lemmon Survey	·	1.6 km	MPC · JPL
651272	2012 XR_{127}	—	September 18, 2003	Kitt Peak	Spacewatch	·	1.9 km	MPC · JPL
651273	2012 XT_{127}	—	December 10, 2012	Haleakala	Pan-STARRS 1	·	1.7 km	MPC · JPL
651274	2012 XZ_{127}	—	December 10, 2012	Haleakala	Pan-STARRS 1	·	2.9 km	MPC · JPL
651275	2012 XK_{128}	—	December 20, 2007	Kitt Peak	Spacewatch	·	2.1 km	MPC · JPL
651276	2012 XR_{130}	—	December 11, 2012	Kachina	Hobart, J.	·	1.4 km	MPC · JPL
651277	2012 XY_{131}	—	December 4, 2012	Mount Lemmon	Mount Lemmon Survey	·	2.4 km	MPC · JPL
651278	2012 XX_{134}	—	November 26, 2012	Mount Lemmon	Mount Lemmon Survey	T_{j} (2.94)	3.7 km	MPC · JPL
651279	2012 XW_{137}	—	September 25, 2012	Mount Lemmon	Mount Lemmon Survey	·	2.4 km	MPC · JPL
651280	2012 XV_{139}	—	July 30, 2005	Palomar	NEAT	·	780 m	MPC · JPL
651281	2012 XR_{140}	—	November 23, 2012	Kitt Peak	Spacewatch	·	650 m	MPC · JPL
651282	2012 XT_{140}	—	September 21, 2001	Apache Point	SDSS Collaboration	EOS	2.2 km	MPC · JPL
651283	2012 XW_{140}	—	May 27, 2003	Kitt Peak	Spacewatch	H	430 m	MPC · JPL
651284	2012 XK_{141}	—	March 26, 2009	Kitt Peak	Spacewatch	·	1.6 km	MPC · JPL
651285	2012 XU_{145}	—	November 24, 2012	Kitt Peak	Spacewatch	·	2.8 km	MPC · JPL
651286	2012 XR_{146}	—	January 1, 2008	Mount Lemmon	Mount Lemmon Survey	·	2.4 km	MPC · JPL
651287	2012 XX_{146}	—	September 16, 2006	Catalina	CSS	·	2.4 km	MPC · JPL
651288	2012 XY_{146}	—	July 27, 2011	Haleakala	Pan-STARRS 1	·	1.9 km	MPC · JPL
651289	2012 XJ_{147}	—	December 3, 2012	Mount Lemmon	Mount Lemmon Survey	·	2.0 km	MPC · JPL
651290	2012 XJ_{148}	—	November 14, 2012	Mount Lemmon	Mount Lemmon Survey	LIX	2.7 km	MPC · JPL
651291	2012 XL_{148}	—	November 6, 2012	Mount Lemmon	Mount Lemmon Survey	·	2.5 km	MPC · JPL
651292	2012 XV_{148}	—	November 26, 2012	Mount Lemmon	Mount Lemmon Survey	·	3.2 km	MPC · JPL
651293	2012 XH_{149}	—	September 26, 2003	Apache Point	SDSS	RAF	920 m	MPC · JPL
651294	2012 XL_{149}	—	December 5, 2012	Mount Lemmon	Mount Lemmon Survey	EOS	1.5 km	MPC · JPL
651295	2012 XO_{149}	—	September 21, 2001	Apache Point	SDSS Collaboration	EOS	1.3 km	MPC · JPL
651296	2012 XY_{159}	—	December 8, 2012	Mount Lemmon	Mount Lemmon Survey	·	1.6 km	MPC · JPL
651297	2012 XE_{160}	—	May 25, 2014	Haleakala	Pan-STARRS 1	·	1.2 km	MPC · JPL
651298	2012 XH_{160}	—	October 1, 2017	Mount Lemmon	Mount Lemmon Survey	·	3.2 km	MPC · JPL
651299	2012 XJ_{161}	—	September 14, 2006	Palomar	NEAT	·	2.1 km	MPC · JPL
651300	2012 XJ_{165}	—	March 26, 2014	Mount Lemmon	Mount Lemmon Survey	·	2.8 km	MPC · JPL

== 651301–651400 ==
back to top

Designation			Discovery			Properties		Ref
Permanent	Provisional	Named after	Date	Site	Discoverer(s)	Category	Diam.	Ref
651301	2012 XK_{165}	—	January 27, 2017	Haleakala	Pan-STARRS 1	·	780 m	MPC · JPL
651302	2012 XX_{165}	—	December 9, 2012	Mount Lemmon	Mount Lemmon Survey	·	780 m	MPC · JPL
651303	2012 XS_{168}	—	December 3, 2012	Mount Lemmon	Mount Lemmon Survey	·	1.8 km	MPC · JPL
651304	2012 XT_{169}	—	December 3, 2012	Catalina	CSS	·	1.0 km	MPC · JPL
651305	2012 XN_{174}	—	December 8, 2012	Mount Lemmon	Mount Lemmon Survey	·	2.4 km	MPC · JPL
651306	2012 XR_{174}	—	December 5, 2012	Mount Lemmon	Mount Lemmon Survey	·	2.4 km	MPC · JPL
651307	2012 XQ_{175}	—	December 6, 2012	Mount Lemmon	Mount Lemmon Survey	·	1.5 km	MPC · JPL
651308	2012 XU_{176}	—	December 11, 2012	Mount Lemmon	Mount Lemmon Survey	·	1.7 km	MPC · JPL
651309	2012 XK_{177}	—	December 3, 2012	Mount Lemmon	Mount Lemmon Survey	·	2.3 km	MPC · JPL
651310	2012 XR_{179}	—	December 9, 2012	Mount Lemmon	Mount Lemmon Survey	·	1.6 km	MPC · JPL
651311	2012 XU_{179}	—	December 5, 2012	Mount Lemmon	Mount Lemmon Survey	·	1.7 km	MPC · JPL
651312	2012 XE_{180}	—	December 18, 2007	Mount Lemmon	Mount Lemmon Survey	HYG	1.9 km	MPC · JPL
651313	2012 YJ_{2}	—	December 18, 2007	Kitt Peak	Spacewatch	·	2.0 km	MPC · JPL
651314	2012 YR_{4}	—	August 8, 2005	Cerro Tololo	Deep Ecliptic Survey	EOS	1.5 km	MPC · JPL
651315	2012 YW_{4}	—	December 14, 2012	ESA OGS	ESA OGS	·	1.8 km	MPC · JPL
651316	2012 YY_{7}	—	December 31, 2012	Haleakala	Pan-STARRS 1	PHO	980 m	MPC · JPL
651317	2012 YQ_{9}	—	September 24, 2009	Kitt Peak	Spacewatch	L4	7.4 km	MPC · JPL
651318	2012 YC_{17}	—	December 23, 2012	Haleakala	Pan-STARRS 1	·	2.5 km	MPC · JPL
651319	2012 YV_{17}	—	December 23, 2012	Haleakala	Pan-STARRS 1	·	2.4 km	MPC · JPL
651320	2012 YB_{18}	—	December 23, 2012	Haleakala	Pan-STARRS 1	·	2.3 km	MPC · JPL
651321	2012 YN_{18}	—	December 23, 2012	Haleakala	Pan-STARRS 1	WIT	860 m	MPC · JPL
651322	2012 YC_{20}	—	December 21, 2012	Mount Lemmon	Mount Lemmon Survey	URS	2.7 km	MPC · JPL
651323	2012 YE_{22}	—	December 22, 2012	Haleakala	Pan-STARRS 1	·	2.6 km	MPC · JPL
651324	2012 YK_{22}	—	August 26, 2011	Piszkéstető	K. Sárneczky	·	2.4 km	MPC · JPL
651325	2012 YO_{23}	—	February 9, 2008	Mount Lemmon	Mount Lemmon Survey	EOS	1.4 km	MPC · JPL
651326	2012 YF_{24}	—	December 23, 2012	Haleakala	Pan-STARRS 1	EOS	1.4 km	MPC · JPL
651327	2012 YJ_{24}	—	December 23, 2012	Haleakala	Pan-STARRS 1	·	800 m	MPC · JPL
651328	2013 AL	—	January 2, 2013	Mount Lemmon	Mount Lemmon Survey	·	2.7 km	MPC · JPL
651329	2013 AS	—	January 1, 2013	Haleakala	Pan-STARRS 1	H	450 m	MPC · JPL
651330	2013 AX	—	July 6, 2003	Kitt Peak	Spacewatch	H	500 m	MPC · JPL
651331	2013 AW_{3}	—	February 1, 2008	Kitt Peak	Spacewatch	·	3.4 km	MPC · JPL
651332	2013 AC_{5}	—	July 2, 2011	Mount Lemmon	Mount Lemmon Survey	·	2.6 km	MPC · JPL
651333	2013 AG_{5}	—	January 3, 2013	Mount Lemmon	Mount Lemmon Survey	·	1.7 km	MPC · JPL
651334	2013 AX_{5}	—	December 3, 2012	Mount Lemmon	Mount Lemmon Survey	·	1.2 km	MPC · JPL
651335	2013 AN_{6}	—	October 20, 2001	Haleakala	NEAT	·	1.9 km	MPC · JPL
651336	2013 AT_{6}	—	October 10, 2006	Palomar	NEAT	·	1.9 km	MPC · JPL
651337	2013 AF_{7}	—	January 3, 2013	Mount Lemmon	Mount Lemmon Survey	·	2.1 km	MPC · JPL
651338	2013 AF_{9}	—	April 8, 2002	Palomar	NEAT	·	3.6 km	MPC · JPL
651339	2013 AX_{9}	—	November 1, 2006	Kitt Peak	Spacewatch	·	2.3 km	MPC · JPL
651340	2013 AZ_{10}	—	September 27, 2011	Mount Lemmon	Mount Lemmon Survey	EOS	1.4 km	MPC · JPL
651341	2013 AR_{11}	—	September 18, 2006	Kitt Peak	Spacewatch	·	1.6 km	MPC · JPL
651342	2013 AF_{12}	—	January 13, 2002	Socorro	LINEAR	EUP	3.3 km	MPC · JPL
651343	2013 AN_{12}	—	January 3, 2013	Mount Lemmon	Mount Lemmon Survey	NYS	820 m	MPC · JPL
651344	2013 AR_{13}	—	January 3, 2013	Mount Lemmon	Mount Lemmon Survey	·	770 m	MPC · JPL
651345	2013 AY_{14}	—	November 12, 2012	Haleakala	Pan-STARRS 1	·	2.2 km	MPC · JPL
651346	2013 AM_{15}	—	October 20, 2006	Kitt Peak	Spacewatch	·	2.5 km	MPC · JPL
651347	2013 AN_{16}	—	August 27, 2006	Kitt Peak	Spacewatch	·	2.0 km	MPC · JPL
651348	2013 AO_{16}	—	November 13, 2012	Mount Lemmon	Mount Lemmon Survey	·	1.1 km	MPC · JPL
651349	2013 AH_{23}	—	February 8, 2002	Kitt Peak	Spacewatch	·	840 m	MPC · JPL
651350	2013 AQ_{26}	—	December 11, 2012	Mount Lemmon	Mount Lemmon Survey	EOS	1.7 km	MPC · JPL
651351	2013 AU_{26}	—	December 13, 2001	Palomar	NEAT	EUP	3.2 km	MPC · JPL
651352	2013 AX_{26}	—	December 11, 2012	Mount Lemmon	Mount Lemmon Survey	EOS	1.6 km	MPC · JPL
651353	2013 AC_{29}	—	February 24, 2008	Mount Lemmon	Mount Lemmon Survey	·	2.7 km	MPC · JPL
651354	2013 AE_{30}	—	January 7, 2013	Mount Lemmon	Mount Lemmon Survey	EOS	1.5 km	MPC · JPL
651355	2013 AE_{31}	—	December 9, 2012	Haleakala	Pan-STARRS 1	·	2.1 km	MPC · JPL
651356	2013 AW_{31}	—	January 6, 2013	Mount Lemmon	Mount Lemmon Survey	·	1.9 km	MPC · JPL
651357	2013 AM_{32}	—	February 6, 2002	Palomar	NEAT	·	4.0 km	MPC · JPL
651358	2013 AV_{33}	—	January 4, 2013	Mount Lemmon	Mount Lemmon Survey	·	2.2 km	MPC · JPL
651359	2013 AD_{34}	—	October 23, 2006	Kitt Peak	Spacewatch	·	2.2 km	MPC · JPL
651360	2013 AK_{34}	—	January 4, 2013	Mount Lemmon	Mount Lemmon Survey	PHO	770 m	MPC · JPL
651361	2013 AO_{34}	—	September 25, 2011	Haleakala	Pan-STARRS 1	VER	2.6 km	MPC · JPL
651362	2013 AT_{36}	—	October 20, 2012	Mount Lemmon	Mount Lemmon Survey	L4	8.4 km	MPC · JPL
651363	2013 AB_{44}	—	March 28, 2008	Mount Lemmon	Mount Lemmon Survey	THM	1.8 km	MPC · JPL
651364	2013 AD_{45}	—	December 1, 2008	Kitt Peak	Spacewatch	·	870 m	MPC · JPL
651365	2013 AF_{45}	—	January 5, 2013	Kitt Peak	Spacewatch	·	2.3 km	MPC · JPL
651366	2013 AR_{45}	—	February 19, 2002	Kitt Peak	Spacewatch	THM	2.3 km	MPC · JPL
651367	2013 AN_{46}	—	August 30, 2011	Piszkés-tető	K. Sárneczky, S. Kürti	·	2.6 km	MPC · JPL
651368	2013 AB_{48}	—	January 7, 2013	Mount Lemmon	Mount Lemmon Survey	VER	2.2 km	MPC · JPL
651369	2013 AR_{49}	—	November 3, 2011	Mount Lemmon	Mount Lemmon Survey	LIX	3.1 km	MPC · JPL
651370 Kolen	2013 AZ_{51}	Kolen	December 13, 2012	Piszkéstető	M. Langbroek, K. Sárneczky	·	1.9 km	MPC · JPL
651371	2013 AE_{52}	—	August 27, 2003	Palomar	NEAT	H	540 m	MPC · JPL
651372	2013 AP_{55}	—	January 6, 2013	Kitt Peak	Spacewatch	TIR	2.0 km	MPC · JPL
651373	2013 AQ_{55}	—	January 6, 2013	Kitt Peak	Spacewatch	L4	7.2 km	MPC · JPL
651374	2013 AZ_{56}	—	January 6, 2013	Kitt Peak	Spacewatch	·	2.0 km	MPC · JPL
651375	2013 AH_{57}	—	February 9, 2006	Palomar	NEAT	·	970 m	MPC · JPL
651376	2013 AL_{57}	—	January 6, 2013	Kitt Peak	Spacewatch	TIR	2.3 km	MPC · JPL
651377	2013 AP_{62}	—	September 3, 2005	Mauna Kea	Veillet, C.	·	2.2 km	MPC · JPL
651378	2013 AE_{63}	—	November 12, 2012	Mount Lemmon	Mount Lemmon Survey	·	2.1 km	MPC · JPL
651379	2013 AJ_{63}	—	February 11, 2008	Mount Lemmon	Mount Lemmon Survey	·	2.6 km	MPC · JPL
651380	2013 AC_{67}	—	November 11, 2007	Mount Lemmon	Mount Lemmon Survey	·	1.3 km	MPC · JPL
651381	2013 AO_{69}	—	January 7, 2013	Mount Lemmon	Mount Lemmon Survey	EMA	2.9 km	MPC · JPL
651382	2013 AB_{72}	—	April 10, 2010	Mount Lemmon	Mount Lemmon Survey	PHO	840 m	MPC · JPL
651383	2013 AD_{75}	—	December 22, 2012	Haleakala	Pan-STARRS 1	·	1.8 km	MPC · JPL
651384	2013 AG_{78}	—	January 10, 2013	Haleakala	Pan-STARRS 1	TIR	2.2 km	MPC · JPL
651385	2013 AJ_{78}	—	August 31, 2005	Kitt Peak	Spacewatch	(1298)	3.2 km	MPC · JPL
651386	2013 AZ_{78}	—	June 14, 2010	Mount Lemmon	Mount Lemmon Survey	·	2.8 km	MPC · JPL
651387	2013 AQ_{79}	—	November 18, 2008	Kitt Peak	Spacewatch	MAS	590 m	MPC · JPL
651388	2013 AN_{80}	—	September 27, 2012	Haleakala	Pan-STARRS 1	T_{j} (2.97) · EUP	2.6 km	MPC · JPL
651389	2013 AR_{81}	—	January 3, 2013	Mount Lemmon	Mount Lemmon Survey	·	880 m	MPC · JPL
651390	2013 AX_{81}	—	January 12, 2013	Mount Lemmon	Mount Lemmon Survey	·	2.0 km	MPC · JPL
651391	2013 AW_{83}	—	December 12, 2012	Kitt Peak	Spacewatch	TIR	2.0 km	MPC · JPL
651392	2013 AC_{84}	—	June 28, 2011	Mount Lemmon	Mount Lemmon Survey	·	2.7 km	MPC · JPL
651393	2013 AP_{84}	—	March 1, 2008	Catalina	CSS	·	2.4 km	MPC · JPL
651394	2013 AA_{85}	—	December 23, 2012	Haleakala	Pan-STARRS 1	HYG	2.4 km	MPC · JPL
651395	2013 AB_{87}	—	December 12, 2012	Kitt Peak	Spacewatch	·	2.9 km	MPC · JPL
651396	2013 AF_{88}	—	August 28, 2011	Haleakala	Pan-STARRS 1	·	1.9 km	MPC · JPL
651397	2013 AF_{90}	—	March 30, 2008	Catalina	CSS	·	2.9 km	MPC · JPL
651398	2013 AY_{90}	—	January 15, 2013	Catalina	CSS	·	2.4 km	MPC · JPL
651399	2013 AM_{91}	—	December 23, 2012	Haleakala	Pan-STARRS 1	·	2.6 km	MPC · JPL
651400	2013 AC_{96}	—	January 10, 2008	Kitt Peak	Spacewatch	·	2.2 km	MPC · JPL

== 651401–651500 ==
back to top

Designation			Discovery			Properties		Ref
Permanent	Provisional	Named after	Date	Site	Discoverer(s)	Category	Diam.	Ref
651401	2013 AY_{96}	—	August 23, 2007	Kitt Peak	Spacewatch	(5)	1.2 km	MPC · JPL
651402	2013 AV_{98}	—	October 21, 2007	Kitt Peak	Spacewatch	·	1.4 km	MPC · JPL
651403	2013 AO_{100}	—	November 19, 2003	Palomar	NEAT	EUN	1.4 km	MPC · JPL
651404	2013 AW_{100}	—	December 22, 2012	Haleakala	Pan-STARRS 1	·	3.8 km	MPC · JPL
651405	2013 AC_{101}	—	October 19, 2006	Kitt Peak	Spacewatch	·	2.2 km	MPC · JPL
651406	2013 AD_{102}	—	January 4, 2013	Mount Lemmon	Mount Lemmon Survey	·	2.1 km	MPC · JPL
651407	2013 AW_{102}	—	September 15, 2007	Mount Lemmon	Mount Lemmon Survey	·	2.5 km	MPC · JPL
651408	2013 AT_{103}	—	December 7, 2001	Kitt Peak	Spacewatch	·	2.6 km	MPC · JPL
651409	2013 AZ_{103}	—	January 6, 2013	Kitt Peak	Spacewatch	L4	10 km	MPC · JPL
651410	2013 AV_{104}	—	December 22, 2012	Piszkéstető	K. Sárneczky, Hodosan, G.	H	480 m	MPC · JPL
651411	2013 AD_{105}	—	July 12, 2005	Mount Lemmon	Mount Lemmon Survey	·	2.5 km	MPC · JPL
651412	2013 AD_{106}	—	January 10, 2013	Haleakala	Pan-STARRS 1	·	2.4 km	MPC · JPL
651413	2013 AL_{107}	—	March 29, 2008	Mount Lemmon	Mount Lemmon Survey	·	2.0 km	MPC · JPL
651414	2013 AB_{108}	—	November 7, 2005	Mauna Kea	A. Boattini	·	810 m	MPC · JPL
651415	2013 AN_{108}	—	July 5, 2005	Mount Lemmon	Mount Lemmon Survey	·	2.4 km	MPC · JPL
651416	2013 AS_{110}	—	January 12, 2013	Mount Lemmon	Mount Lemmon Survey	EOS	1.7 km	MPC · JPL
651417	2013 AC_{111}	—	January 12, 2013	Mount Lemmon	Mount Lemmon Survey	EOS	1.6 km	MPC · JPL
651418	2013 AJ_{111}	—	September 23, 2011	Kitt Peak	Spacewatch	EOS	1.8 km	MPC · JPL
651419	2013 AR_{114}	—	December 6, 2012	Mount Lemmon	Mount Lemmon Survey	·	2.2 km	MPC · JPL
651420	2013 AK_{116}	—	March 10, 2002	Kitt Peak	Spacewatch	·	3.1 km	MPC · JPL
651421	2013 AN_{120}	—	January 13, 2013	ESA OGS	ESA OGS	·	1.2 km	MPC · JPL
651422	2013 AX_{120}	—	June 26, 2011	Mount Lemmon	Mount Lemmon Survey	·	3.9 km	MPC · JPL
651423	2013 AE_{121}	—	November 3, 2008	Mount Lemmon	Mount Lemmon Survey	·	1.3 km	MPC · JPL
651424	2013 AY_{122}	—	January 15, 2013	Nogales	M. Schwartz, P. R. Holvorcem	·	940 m	MPC · JPL
651425	2013 AY_{123}	—	January 14, 2013	ESA OGS	ESA OGS	·	1.5 km	MPC · JPL
651426	2013 AL_{125}	—	August 24, 2011	Haleakala	Pan-STARRS 1	·	2.3 km	MPC · JPL
651427	2013 AS_{125}	—	January 3, 2013	Haleakala	Pan-STARRS 1	·	2.5 km	MPC · JPL
651428	2013 AV_{125}	—	February 12, 2008	Mount Lemmon	Mount Lemmon Survey	·	2.5 km	MPC · JPL
651429	2013 AQ_{128}	—	February 11, 2004	Anderson Mesa	LONEOS	EUN	1.5 km	MPC · JPL
651430	2013 AX_{130}	—	December 16, 2007	Mount Lemmon	Mount Lemmon Survey	·	1.9 km	MPC · JPL
651431	2013 AQ_{132}	—	December 12, 1998	Kitt Peak	Spacewatch	L4	9.2 km	MPC · JPL
651432	2013 AF_{133}	—	January 6, 2013	Kitt Peak	Spacewatch	L4	7.1 km	MPC · JPL
651433	2013 AO_{133}	—	January 9, 2013	Kitt Peak	Spacewatch	L4	7.8 km	MPC · JPL
651434	2013 AV_{134}	—	December 23, 2012	Haleakala	Pan-STARRS 1	·	2.3 km	MPC · JPL
651435	2013 AX_{134}	—	September 11, 2001	Kitt Peak	Spacewatch	·	1.6 km	MPC · JPL
651436	2013 AM_{135}	—	February 10, 2008	Kitt Peak	Spacewatch	·	2.1 km	MPC · JPL
651437	2013 AE_{136}	—	January 10, 2013	Haleakala	Pan-STARRS 1	·	2.3 km	MPC · JPL
651438	2013 AR_{136}	—	January 10, 2013	Haleakala	Pan-STARRS 1	·	2.5 km	MPC · JPL
651439	2013 AD_{138}	—	January 13, 2013	Mount Lemmon	Mount Lemmon Survey	·	1.6 km	MPC · JPL
651440	2013 AD_{143}	—	March 13, 2002	Socorro	LINEAR	·	2.8 km	MPC · JPL
651441	2013 AY_{146}	—	January 4, 2013	Cerro Tololo-DECam	DECam	·	2.2 km	MPC · JPL
651442	2013 AZ_{146}	—	November 19, 2006	Kitt Peak	Spacewatch	·	2.4 km	MPC · JPL
651443	2013 AO_{148}	—	January 4, 2013	Cerro Tololo-DECam	DECam	·	2.1 km	MPC · JPL
651444	2013 AH_{151}	—	November 17, 2006	Kitt Peak	Spacewatch	·	2.3 km	MPC · JPL
651445	2013 AP_{153}	—	January 4, 2013	Cerro Tololo-DECam	DECam	·	1.9 km	MPC · JPL
651446	2013 AU_{153}	—	June 13, 2004	Kitt Peak	Spacewatch	·	2.4 km	MPC · JPL
651447	2013 AV_{153}	—	January 20, 2013	Mount Lemmon	Mount Lemmon Survey	·	2.0 km	MPC · JPL
651448	2013 AQ_{155}	—	January 20, 2013	Mount Lemmon	Mount Lemmon Survey	·	1.6 km	MPC · JPL
651449	2013 AX_{156}	—	January 4, 2013	Cerro Tololo-DECam	DECam	·	2.6 km	MPC · JPL
651450	2013 AX_{160}	—	October 19, 2011	Mount Lemmon	Mount Lemmon Survey	EOS	1.4 km	MPC · JPL
651451	2013 AJ_{162}	—	January 20, 2013	Mount Lemmon	Mount Lemmon Survey	·	880 m	MPC · JPL
651452	2013 AH_{167}	—	October 28, 2011	Mount Lemmon	Mount Lemmon Survey	EOS	1.3 km	MPC · JPL
651453	2013 AD_{168}	—	November 12, 2012	Mount Lemmon	Mount Lemmon Survey	EUP	3.0 km	MPC · JPL
651454	2013 AK_{168}	—	February 13, 2008	Kitt Peak	Spacewatch	EOS	1.3 km	MPC · JPL
651455	2013 AH_{170}	—	January 4, 2013	Cerro Tololo-DECam	DECam	·	2.2 km	MPC · JPL
651456	2013 AY_{170}	—	October 22, 2011	Mount Lemmon	Mount Lemmon Survey	·	1.8 km	MPC · JPL
651457	2013 AM_{171}	—	January 4, 2013	Cerro Tololo-DECam	DECam	·	2.3 km	MPC · JPL
651458	2013 AC_{175}	—	October 6, 2007	Kitt Peak	Spacewatch	·	1.5 km	MPC · JPL
651459	2013 AV_{185}	—	January 3, 2013	Mount Lemmon	Mount Lemmon Survey	NYS	1.0 km	MPC · JPL
651460	2013 AH_{186}	—	January 5, 2013	Mount Lemmon	Mount Lemmon Survey	EOS	1.7 km	MPC · JPL
651461	2013 AQ_{187}	—	January 10, 2013	Haleakala	Pan-STARRS 1	(58892)	2.4 km	MPC · JPL
651462	2013 AM_{188}	—	January 4, 2013	Mount Lemmon	Mount Lemmon Survey	·	1.0 km	MPC · JPL
651463	2013 AP_{188}	—	January 4, 2013	Kitt Peak	Spacewatch	·	2.1 km	MPC · JPL
651464	2013 AH_{189}	—	January 7, 2013	Haleakala	Pan-STARRS 1	·	3.1 km	MPC · JPL
651465	2013 AY_{192}	—	April 25, 2003	Kitt Peak	Spacewatch	·	1.8 km	MPC · JPL
651466	2013 AL_{193}	—	August 8, 2016	Haleakala	Pan-STARRS 1	·	2.2 km	MPC · JPL
651467	2013 AP_{194}	—	January 4, 2013	Mount Lemmon	Mount Lemmon Survey	EOS	1.5 km	MPC · JPL
651468	2013 AZ_{195}	—	January 10, 2013	Kitt Peak	Spacewatch	·	680 m	MPC · JPL
651469	2013 AL_{197}	—	January 7, 2013	Mount Lemmon	Mount Lemmon Survey	·	2.0 km	MPC · JPL
651470	2013 AH_{203}	—	January 10, 2013	Haleakala	Pan-STARRS 1	L4	6.0 km	MPC · JPL
651471	2013 AY_{203}	—	January 6, 2013	Mount Lemmon	Mount Lemmon Survey	EOS	1.5 km	MPC · JPL
651472	2013 AG_{204}	—	January 3, 2013	Mount Lemmon	Mount Lemmon Survey	·	2.0 km	MPC · JPL
651473	2013 AU_{204}	—	January 6, 2013	Kitt Peak	Spacewatch	·	2.2 km	MPC · JPL
651474	2013 AO_{207}	—	January 10, 2013	Mount Lemmon	Mount Lemmon Survey	·	1.9 km	MPC · JPL
651475	2013 AY_{209}	—	January 10, 2013	Mount Lemmon	Mount Lemmon Survey	·	1.8 km	MPC · JPL
651476	2013 BU_{7}	—	February 9, 2008	Kitt Peak	Spacewatch	·	2.6 km	MPC · JPL
651477	2013 BW_{8}	—	January 16, 2013	Haleakala	Pan-STARRS 1	·	2.3 km	MPC · JPL
651478	2013 BR_{11}	—	January 9, 2013	Kitt Peak	Spacewatch	·	2.7 km	MPC · JPL
651479	2013 BM_{12}	—	September 19, 2011	Haleakala	Pan-STARRS 1	·	2.6 km	MPC · JPL
651480	2013 BB_{17}	—	November 2, 2010	Mount Lemmon	Mount Lemmon Survey	L4	6.3 km	MPC · JPL
651481	2013 BS_{20}	—	January 16, 2013	Haleakala	Pan-STARRS 1	·	2.3 km	MPC · JPL
651482	2013 BB_{24}	—	January 17, 2013	Haleakala	Pan-STARRS 1	·	2.4 km	MPC · JPL
651483	2013 BB_{26}	—	January 18, 2013	Kitt Peak	Spacewatch	·	2.6 km	MPC · JPL
651484	2013 BP_{29}	—	December 19, 2001	Kitt Peak	Spacewatch	·	2.5 km	MPC · JPL
651485	2013 BG_{30}	—	November 27, 2006	Kitt Peak	Spacewatch	·	2.0 km	MPC · JPL
651486	2013 BQ_{31}	—	December 10, 2006	Kitt Peak	Spacewatch	HYG	2.2 km	MPC · JPL
651487	2013 BK_{35}	—	July 19, 2006	Mauna Kea	P. A. Wiegert, D. Subasinghe	·	1.8 km	MPC · JPL
651488	2013 BY_{35}	—	September 4, 2011	Haleakala	Pan-STARRS 1	·	2.6 km	MPC · JPL
651489	2013 BW_{40}	—	December 25, 2006	Kitt Peak	Spacewatch	·	2.1 km	MPC · JPL
651490	2013 BG_{44}	—	February 7, 2008	Kitt Peak	Spacewatch	·	1.9 km	MPC · JPL
651491	2013 BM_{44}	—	September 14, 2005	Kitt Peak	Spacewatch	·	3.0 km	MPC · JPL
651492	2013 BU_{46}	—	July 4, 2005	Palomar	NEAT	·	3.5 km	MPC · JPL
651493	2013 BF_{48}	—	December 23, 2012	Haleakala	Pan-STARRS 1	·	2.6 km	MPC · JPL
651494	2013 BV_{48}	—	December 23, 2012	Haleakala	Pan-STARRS 1	·	2.1 km	MPC · JPL
651495	2013 BC_{49}	—	December 23, 2012	Haleakala	Pan-STARRS 1	HYG	2.0 km	MPC · JPL
651496	2013 BL_{49}	—	October 31, 2008	Kitt Peak	Spacewatch	NYS	820 m	MPC · JPL
651497	2013 BM_{55}	—	January 17, 2013	Haleakala	Pan-STARRS 1	URS	2.6 km	MPC · JPL
651498	2013 BZ_{58}	—	September 19, 1998	Apache Point	SDSS Collaboration	L4	8.1 km	MPC · JPL
651499	2013 BD_{59}	—	October 5, 2004	Anderson Mesa	LONEOS	MAS	550 m	MPC · JPL
651500	2013 BR_{60}	—	February 9, 2002	Kitt Peak	Spacewatch	·	2.1 km	MPC · JPL

== 651501–651600 ==
back to top

Designation			Discovery			Properties		Ref
Permanent	Provisional	Named after	Date	Site	Discoverer(s)	Category	Diam.	Ref
651501	2013 BV_{60}	—	January 7, 2013	Kitt Peak	Spacewatch	L4	8.3 km	MPC · JPL
651502	2013 BF_{61}	—	January 7, 2013	Kitt Peak	Spacewatch	·	2.4 km	MPC · JPL
651503	2013 BB_{65}	—	January 6, 2013	Kitt Peak	Spacewatch	·	2.4 km	MPC · JPL
651504	2013 BE_{73}	—	August 29, 2005	Kitt Peak	Spacewatch	·	2.6 km	MPC · JPL
651505	2013 BJ_{75}	—	February 27, 2008	Mount Lemmon	Mount Lemmon Survey	(31811)	2.9 km	MPC · JPL
651506	2013 BD_{78}	—	September 13, 2002	Palomar	NEAT	·	1.7 km	MPC · JPL
651507	2013 BV_{79}	—	January 25, 2013	Haleakala	Pan-STARRS 1	·	2.0 km	MPC · JPL
651508	2013 BM_{83}	—	January 20, 2009	Kitt Peak	Spacewatch	NYS	1.1 km	MPC · JPL
651509	2013 BU_{83}	—	November 2, 2011	Mount Lemmon	Mount Lemmon Survey	·	2.6 km	MPC · JPL
651510	2013 BV_{84}	—	January 17, 2013	Mount Lemmon	Mount Lemmon Survey	·	2.2 km	MPC · JPL
651511	2013 BE_{85}	—	December 21, 2006	Kitt Peak	Spacewatch	·	2.6 km	MPC · JPL
651512	2013 BS_{85}	—	January 22, 2013	Haleakala	Pan-STARRS 1	·	2.2 km	MPC · JPL
651513	2013 BE_{88}	—	January 17, 2013	Haleakala	Pan-STARRS 1	·	2.6 km	MPC · JPL
651514	2013 BT_{90}	—	January 17, 2013	Haleakala	Pan-STARRS 1	·	2.4 km	MPC · JPL
651515	2013 BO_{91}	—	January 14, 2013	ESA OGS	ESA OGS	L4	8.8 km	MPC · JPL
651516	2013 BC_{94}	—	January 17, 2013	Haleakala	Pan-STARRS 1	·	2.0 km	MPC · JPL
651517	2013 BM_{94}	—	January 22, 2013	Mount Lemmon	Mount Lemmon Survey	V	510 m	MPC · JPL
651518	2013 BG_{95}	—	January 19, 2013	Kitt Peak	Spacewatch	·	2.3 km	MPC · JPL
651519	2013 BR_{96}	—	January 17, 2013	Kitt Peak	Spacewatch	L4	7.3 km	MPC · JPL
651520	2013 BC_{100}	—	November 18, 2011	Mount Lemmon	Mount Lemmon Survey	·	2.7 km	MPC · JPL
651521	2013 BA_{101}	—	January 17, 2013	Haleakala	Pan-STARRS 1	·	2.1 km	MPC · JPL
651522	2013 BK_{101}	—	January 20, 2013	Kitt Peak	Spacewatch	·	2.4 km	MPC · JPL
651523	2013 BE_{103}	—	January 17, 2013	Haleakala	Pan-STARRS 1	·	2.6 km	MPC · JPL
651524	2013 BA_{107}	—	January 16, 2013	Haleakala	Pan-STARRS 1	·	2.2 km	MPC · JPL
651525	2013 CA	—	October 2, 2006	Catalina	CSS	H	650 m	MPC · JPL
651526	2013 CC_{1}	—	December 21, 2012	Mount Lemmon	Mount Lemmon Survey	H	490 m	MPC · JPL
651527	2013 CX_{4}	—	November 16, 2006	Kitt Peak	Spacewatch	·	2.0 km	MPC · JPL
651528	2013 CV_{11}	—	January 19, 2013	Kitt Peak	Spacewatch	·	2.4 km	MPC · JPL
651529	2013 CS_{16}	—	November 6, 2007	Kitt Peak	Spacewatch	·	1.4 km	MPC · JPL
651530	2013 CF_{25}	—	January 13, 2013	ESA OGS	ESA OGS	·	2.7 km	MPC · JPL
651531	2013 CK_{25}	—	January 17, 2013	Kitt Peak	Spacewatch	·	2.7 km	MPC · JPL
651532	2013 CR_{29}	—	February 1, 2013	Kitt Peak	Spacewatch	·	2.2 km	MPC · JPL
651533	2013 CS_{30}	—	February 5, 2013	Oukaïmeden	C. Rinner	·	2.7 km	MPC · JPL
651534	2013 CW_{31}	—	January 16, 2013	Haleakala	Pan-STARRS 1	·	2.2 km	MPC · JPL
651535	2013 CU_{32}	—	October 20, 2012	Mount Lemmon	Mount Lemmon Survey	H	530 m	MPC · JPL
651536	2013 CZ_{33}	—	February 3, 2013	Haleakala	Pan-STARRS 1	·	2.8 km	MPC · JPL
651537	2013 CH_{39}	—	February 1, 2013	Kitt Peak	Spacewatch	VER	2.2 km	MPC · JPL
651538	2013 CS_{39}	—	July 19, 2006	Mauna Kea	P. A. Wiegert, D. Subasinghe	L4	8.4 km	MPC · JPL
651539	2013 CO_{40}	—	September 20, 2011	Zelenchukskaya Stn	T. V. Krjačko, Satovski, B.	·	3.0 km	MPC · JPL
651540	2013 CV_{41}	—	September 28, 2006	Kitt Peak	Spacewatch	·	1.7 km	MPC · JPL
651541	2013 CU_{42}	—	February 13, 2002	Kitt Peak	Spacewatch	TIR	2.2 km	MPC · JPL
651542	2013 CV_{45}	—	June 14, 2010	Mount Lemmon	Mount Lemmon Survey	·	2.5 km	MPC · JPL
651543	2013 CQ_{47}	—	January 29, 2007	Kitt Peak	Spacewatch	·	2.8 km	MPC · JPL
651544	2013 CY_{48}	—	January 17, 2013	Haleakala	Pan-STARRS 1	L4	7.4 km	MPC · JPL
651545	2013 CD_{50}	—	March 19, 2002	Anderson Mesa	LONEOS	·	2.6 km	MPC · JPL
651546	2013 CB_{51}	—	November 2, 2008	Kitt Peak	Spacewatch	·	850 m	MPC · JPL
651547	2013 CE_{53}	—	November 8, 2007	Mount Lemmon	Mount Lemmon Survey	·	1.7 km	MPC · JPL
651548	2013 CG_{55}	—	February 9, 2013	Haleakala	Pan-STARRS 1	·	1.9 km	MPC · JPL
651549	2013 CV_{56}	—	April 4, 2005	Catalina	CSS	H	550 m	MPC · JPL
651550	2013 CS_{58}	—	November 1, 2011	Catalina	CSS	·	3.1 km	MPC · JPL
651551	2013 CC_{61}	—	April 21, 2004	Kitt Peak	Spacewatch	L4	9.8 km	MPC · JPL
651552	2013 CJ_{61}	—	February 5, 2013	Kitt Peak	Spacewatch	·	2.9 km	MPC · JPL
651553	2013 CW_{62}	—	February 8, 2013	Haleakala	Pan-STARRS 1	·	870 m	MPC · JPL
651554	2013 CY_{62}	—	March 8, 2008	Kitt Peak	Spacewatch	HYG	2.5 km	MPC · JPL
651555	2013 CH_{65}	—	February 5, 2013	Catalina	CSS	TIR	2.3 km	MPC · JPL
651556	2013 CL_{68}	—	February 5, 2013	Nogales	M. Schwartz, P. R. Holvorcem	DOR	2.6 km	MPC · JPL
651557	2013 CQ_{68}	—	July 6, 2010	Kitt Peak	Spacewatch	·	3.2 km	MPC · JPL
651558	2013 CH_{71}	—	January 17, 2013	Mount Lemmon	Mount Lemmon Survey	·	2.7 km	MPC · JPL
651559	2013 CW_{72}	—	February 3, 2013	Haleakala	Pan-STARRS 1	H	490 m	MPC · JPL
651560	2013 CB_{78}	—	January 7, 2013	Kitt Peak	Spacewatch	PHO	910 m	MPC · JPL
651561	2013 CS_{78}	—	January 5, 2013	Mount Lemmon	Mount Lemmon Survey	L4	8.2 km	MPC · JPL
651562	2013 CP_{80}	—	April 14, 2008	Mount Lemmon	Mount Lemmon Survey	TIR	2.3 km	MPC · JPL
651563	2013 CZ_{80}	—	February 8, 2013	Haleakala	Pan-STARRS 1	L4	8.5 km	MPC · JPL
651564	2013 CF_{86}	—	December 23, 2012	Haleakala	Pan-STARRS 1	HYG	2.8 km	MPC · JPL
651565	2013 CL_{89}	—	February 11, 2013	Catalina	CSS	APO	450 m	MPC · JPL
651566	2013 CN_{90}	—	March 29, 2003	Anderson Mesa	LONEOS	EOS	2.5 km	MPC · JPL
651567	2013 CX_{90}	—	January 5, 2013	Catalina	CSS	·	2.0 km	MPC · JPL
651568	2013 CV_{91}	—	September 17, 2010	Kitt Peak	Spacewatch	·	2.2 km	MPC · JPL
651569	2013 CO_{93}	—	February 6, 2002	Kitt Peak	Deep Ecliptic Survey	L4	6.3 km	MPC · JPL
651570	2013 CR_{93}	—	May 17, 2009	Mount Lemmon	Mount Lemmon Survey	·	2.8 km	MPC · JPL
651571	2013 CX_{95}	—	February 8, 2013	Haleakala	Pan-STARRS 1	·	2.2 km	MPC · JPL
651572	2013 CN_{97}	—	November 17, 2006	Kitt Peak	Spacewatch	THM	2.1 km	MPC · JPL
651573	2013 CJ_{98}	—	February 20, 2002	Kitt Peak	Spacewatch	·	3.2 km	MPC · JPL
651574	2013 CV_{98}	—	February 8, 2013	Haleakala	Pan-STARRS 1	·	800 m	MPC · JPL
651575	2013 CP_{100}	—	March 6, 2008	Mount Lemmon	Mount Lemmon Survey	EOS	2.3 km	MPC · JPL
651576	2013 CS_{100}	—	January 17, 2013	Mount Lemmon	Mount Lemmon Survey	·	930 m	MPC · JPL
651577	2013 CG_{101}	—	February 8, 2013	Haleakala	Pan-STARRS 1	·	2.7 km	MPC · JPL
651578	2013 CW_{104}	—	October 10, 2004	Kitt Peak	Spacewatch	NYS	780 m	MPC · JPL
651579	2013 CM_{105}	—	February 9, 2013	Haleakala	Pan-STARRS 1	L4	6.6 km	MPC · JPL
651580	2013 CC_{109}	—	January 8, 2013	Oukaïmeden	M. Ory	ERI	1.3 km	MPC · JPL
651581	2013 CB_{113}	—	February 6, 2013	Kitt Peak	Spacewatch	·	2.9 km	MPC · JPL
651582	2013 CP_{113}	—	August 20, 2004	Kitt Peak	Spacewatch	NYS	860 m	MPC · JPL
651583	2013 CQ_{113}	—	February 9, 2005	Mount Lemmon	Mount Lemmon Survey	·	1.0 km	MPC · JPL
651584	2013 CX_{113}	—	October 22, 2006	Kitt Peak	Spacewatch	·	1.8 km	MPC · JPL
651585	2013 CG_{115}	—	September 19, 2003	Palomar	NEAT	H	460 m	MPC · JPL
651586	2013 CU_{115}	—	February 12, 2013	Haleakala	Pan-STARRS 1	·	2.4 km	MPC · JPL
651587	2013 CX_{118}	—	March 16, 2002	Haleakala	NEAT	TIR	3.2 km	MPC · JPL
651588	2013 CF_{119}	—	February 7, 2013	Kitt Peak	Spacewatch	·	2.6 km	MPC · JPL
651589	2013 CA_{120}	—	January 16, 2013	ESA OGS	ESA OGS	·	2.3 km	MPC · JPL
651590	2013 CG_{120}	—	April 19, 2006	Mount Lemmon	Mount Lemmon Survey	MAS	520 m	MPC · JPL
651591	2013 CB_{121}	—	January 22, 2013	Mount Lemmon	Mount Lemmon Survey	·	2.6 km	MPC · JPL
651592	2013 CE_{121}	—	September 23, 2011	Kitt Peak	Spacewatch	·	2.1 km	MPC · JPL
651593	2013 CW_{123}	—	February 12, 2013	ESA OGS	ESA OGS	·	3.0 km	MPC · JPL
651594	2013 CH_{126}	—	January 14, 2013	Mount Lemmon	Mount Lemmon Survey	·	2.7 km	MPC · JPL
651595	2013 CA_{128}	—	December 12, 2006	Socorro	LINEAR	THB	3.2 km	MPC · JPL
651596	2013 CF_{128}	—	February 14, 2013	Haleakala	Pan-STARRS 1	BAR	880 m	MPC · JPL
651597	2013 CH_{128}	—	September 27, 2003	Socorro	LINEAR	·	2.3 km	MPC · JPL
651598	2013 CY_{132}	—	February 9, 2008	Kitt Peak	Spacewatch	·	2.3 km	MPC · JPL
651599	2013 CZ_{132}	—	February 9, 2013	Haleakala	Pan-STARRS 1	·	2.2 km	MPC · JPL
651600	2013 CR_{135}	—	February 13, 2013	ESA OGS	ESA OGS	·	2.8 km	MPC · JPL

== 651601–651700 ==
back to top

Designation			Discovery			Properties		Ref
Permanent	Provisional	Named after	Date	Site	Discoverer(s)	Category	Diam.	Ref
651601	2013 CQ_{138}	—	March 4, 2008	Mount Lemmon	Mount Lemmon Survey	T_{j} (2.99)	2.8 km	MPC · JPL
651602	2013 CK_{139}	—	February 14, 2013	Haleakala	Pan-STARRS 1	LIX	3.2 km	MPC · JPL
651603	2013 CM_{139}	—	February 14, 2013	Haleakala	Pan-STARRS 1	NYS	1.1 km	MPC · JPL
651604	2013 CE_{140}	—	January 20, 2013	Kitt Peak	Spacewatch	L4	7.8 km	MPC · JPL
651605	2013 CD_{141}	—	April 30, 2006	Kitt Peak	Spacewatch	·	850 m	MPC · JPL
651606	2013 CK_{145}	—	February 14, 2013	Mount Lemmon	Mount Lemmon Survey	VER	2.3 km	MPC · JPL
651607	2013 CN_{145}	—	February 6, 2013	Kitt Peak	Spacewatch	·	2.4 km	MPC · JPL
651608	2013 CU_{145}	—	February 14, 2013	Kitt Peak	Spacewatch	L4	8.1 km	MPC · JPL
651609	2013 CV_{146}	—	January 2, 2012	Kitt Peak	Spacewatch	L4	6.8 km	MPC · JPL
651610	2013 CJ_{147}	—	February 14, 2013	Kitt Peak	Spacewatch	VER	2.2 km	MPC · JPL
651611	2013 CL_{149}	—	September 17, 2010	Mount Lemmon	Mount Lemmon Survey	·	3.1 km	MPC · JPL
651612	2013 CU_{150}	—	May 7, 2008	Kitt Peak	Spacewatch	THM	1.9 km	MPC · JPL
651613	2013 CB_{151}	—	January 7, 2009	Kitt Peak	Spacewatch	MAS	610 m	MPC · JPL
651614	2013 CN_{152}	—	February 14, 2013	Haleakala	Pan-STARRS 1	·	2.2 km	MPC · JPL
651615	2013 CH_{155}	—	February 15, 2013	Haleakala	Pan-STARRS 1	·	1.5 km	MPC · JPL
651616	2013 CF_{159}	—	February 15, 2013	Haleakala	Pan-STARRS 1	·	2.6 km	MPC · JPL
651617	2013 CT_{159}	—	October 1, 2005	Mount Lemmon	Mount Lemmon Survey	THM	1.8 km	MPC · JPL
651618	2013 CT_{160}	—	October 9, 2008	Kitt Peak	Spacewatch	L4	6.6 km	MPC · JPL
651619	2013 CN_{164}	—	February 16, 2013	Mount Lemmon	Mount Lemmon Survey	·	2.8 km	MPC · JPL
651620	2013 CD_{167}	—	January 27, 2007	Mount Lemmon	Mount Lemmon Survey	·	2.9 km	MPC · JPL
651621	2013 CO_{168}	—	February 14, 2013	Haleakala	Pan-STARRS 1	·	960 m	MPC · JPL
651622	2013 CV_{169}	—	February 15, 2013	Mount Lemmon	Mount Lemmon Survey	NYS	920 m	MPC · JPL
651623	2013 CM_{170}	—	September 23, 2008	Kitt Peak	Spacewatch	L4	7.9 km	MPC · JPL
651624	2013 CL_{176}	—	February 15, 2013	Elena Remote	Oreshko, A.	·	2.7 km	MPC · JPL
651625	2013 CX_{182}	—	March 13, 2008	Kitt Peak	Spacewatch	·	2.2 km	MPC · JPL
651626	2013 CL_{185}	—	April 14, 2008	Kitt Peak	Spacewatch	·	2.4 km	MPC · JPL
651627	2013 CQ_{185}	—	January 18, 2013	Mount Lemmon	Mount Lemmon Survey	·	950 m	MPC · JPL
651628	2013 CB_{186}	—	January 18, 2004	Kitt Peak	Spacewatch	·	1.5 km	MPC · JPL
651629	2013 CJ_{187}	—	January 20, 2013	Kitt Peak	Spacewatch	·	2.6 km	MPC · JPL
651630	2013 CF_{188}	—	February 9, 2013	Haleakala	Pan-STARRS 1	·	3.2 km	MPC · JPL
651631	2013 CG_{188}	—	February 5, 2002	Palomar	NEAT	EOS	2.2 km	MPC · JPL
651632	2013 CB_{191}	—	April 8, 2008	Mount Lemmon	Mount Lemmon Survey	TIR	2.3 km	MPC · JPL
651633	2013 CR_{193}	—	December 3, 2010	Mount Lemmon	Mount Lemmon Survey	L4	7.9 km	MPC · JPL
651634	2013 CR_{194}	—	February 1, 2013	Kitt Peak	Spacewatch	L4	6.9 km	MPC · JPL
651635	2013 CB_{197}	—	January 28, 2012	Haleakala	Pan-STARRS 1	L4	6.5 km	MPC · JPL
651636	2013 CG_{197}	—	January 9, 2013	Kitt Peak	Spacewatch	·	2.1 km	MPC · JPL
651637	2013 CN_{200}	—	September 28, 2008	Mount Lemmon	Mount Lemmon Survey	L4	7.4 km	MPC · JPL
651638	2013 CR_{201}	—	February 9, 2013	Haleakala	Pan-STARRS 1	·	2.6 km	MPC · JPL
651639	2013 CJ_{203}	—	January 1, 2009	Kitt Peak	Spacewatch	·	810 m	MPC · JPL
651640	2013 CF_{204}	—	August 30, 2005	Kitt Peak	Spacewatch	·	2.4 km	MPC · JPL
651641	2013 CS_{205}	—	January 30, 2008	Mount Lemmon	Mount Lemmon Survey	·	1.7 km	MPC · JPL
651642	2013 CS_{206}	—	February 8, 2013	Haleakala	Pan-STARRS 1	·	2.3 km	MPC · JPL
651643	2013 CV_{207}	—	December 12, 2012	Kitt Peak	Spacewatch	·	2.4 km	MPC · JPL
651644	2013 CM_{213}	—	October 25, 2011	Haleakala	Pan-STARRS 1	·	2.6 km	MPC · JPL
651645	2013 CZ_{214}	—	January 10, 2013	Mount Lemmon	Mount Lemmon Survey	·	2.6 km	MPC · JPL
651646	2013 CG_{215}	—	February 11, 2002	Socorro	LINEAR	·	2.0 km	MPC · JPL
651647	2013 CH_{215}	—	February 10, 1996	Kitt Peak	Spacewatch	·	2.4 km	MPC · JPL
651648	2013 CP_{215}	—	October 18, 2011	Kitt Peak	Spacewatch	·	1.9 km	MPC · JPL
651649	2013 CW_{215}	—	January 27, 2007	Mount Lemmon	Mount Lemmon Survey	·	2.7 km	MPC · JPL
651650	2013 CO_{218}	—	December 6, 2010	Mount Lemmon	Mount Lemmon Survey	L4	5.5 km	MPC · JPL
651651	2013 CG_{219}	—	September 2, 2010	Mount Lemmon	Mount Lemmon Survey	·	1.9 km	MPC · JPL
651652	2013 CY_{222}	—	February 5, 2013	Kitt Peak	Spacewatch	EOS	1.5 km	MPC · JPL
651653	2013 CN_{224}	—	February 15, 2013	Haleakala	Pan-STARRS 1	·	2.0 km	MPC · JPL
651654	2013 CJ_{227}	—	March 6, 2013	Haleakala	Pan-STARRS 1	·	2.6 km	MPC · JPL
651655	2013 CW_{229}	—	February 15, 2013	Haleakala	Pan-STARRS 1	·	2.8 km	MPC · JPL
651656	2013 CC_{230}	—	August 10, 2016	Haleakala	Pan-STARRS 1	·	2.7 km	MPC · JPL
651657	2013 CP_{231}	—	May 11, 2005	Catalina	CSS	·	1.3 km	MPC · JPL
651658	2013 CB_{238}	—	October 10, 2015	Haleakala	Pan-STARRS 1	V	510 m	MPC · JPL
651659	2013 CA_{239}	—	September 18, 2003	Kitt Peak	Spacewatch	NYS	1.0 km	MPC · JPL
651660	2013 CE_{240}	—	February 13, 2013	Haleakala	Pan-STARRS 1	·	2.1 km	MPC · JPL
651661	2013 CN_{240}	—	February 5, 2013	Mount Lemmon	Mount Lemmon Survey	·	1.8 km	MPC · JPL
651662	2013 CE_{242}	—	February 3, 2013	Haleakala	Pan-STARRS 1	·	2.7 km	MPC · JPL
651663	2013 CF_{244}	—	February 3, 2013	Haleakala	Pan-STARRS 1	VER	2.0 km	MPC · JPL
651664	2013 CG_{245}	—	February 14, 2013	Haleakala	Pan-STARRS 1	L4	5.7 km	MPC · JPL
651665	2013 CA_{249}	—	February 8, 2013	Haleakala	Pan-STARRS 1	L4	6.6 km	MPC · JPL
651666	2013 CS_{251}	—	February 8, 2013	Haleakala	Pan-STARRS 1	·	2.1 km	MPC · JPL
651667	2013 CV_{251}	—	February 8, 2013	Haleakala	Pan-STARRS 1	L4	6.7 km	MPC · JPL
651668	2013 CW_{251}	—	February 15, 2013	Haleakala	Pan-STARRS 1	·	2.5 km	MPC · JPL
651669	2013 CZ_{252}	—	February 9, 2013	Haleakala	Pan-STARRS 1	·	2.3 km	MPC · JPL
651670	2013 CD_{253}	—	February 5, 2013	Mount Lemmon	Mount Lemmon Survey	·	2.1 km	MPC · JPL
651671	2013 CF_{253}	—	January 16, 2007	Anderson Mesa	LONEOS	·	2.9 km	MPC · JPL
651672	2013 CS_{253}	—	February 9, 2013	Haleakala	Pan-STARRS 1	·	2.4 km	MPC · JPL
651673	2013 CO_{255}	—	October 23, 2009	Mount Lemmon	Mount Lemmon Survey	L4	6.7 km	MPC · JPL
651674	2013 CS_{256}	—	February 8, 2013	Haleakala	Pan-STARRS 1	·	2.3 km	MPC · JPL
651675	2013 CV_{257}	—	September 23, 2011	Haleakala	Pan-STARRS 1	·	2.1 km	MPC · JPL
651676	2013 CJ_{258}	—	February 13, 2013	Haleakala	Pan-STARRS 1	·	3.1 km	MPC · JPL
651677	2013 CN_{258}	—	February 15, 2013	Haleakala	Pan-STARRS 1	·	2.1 km	MPC · JPL
651678	2013 CF_{259}	—	February 14, 2013	Catalina	CSS	L4	6.7 km	MPC · JPL
651679	2013 CE_{261}	—	February 13, 2013	Haleakala	Pan-STARRS 1	·	2.5 km	MPC · JPL
651680	2013 CJ_{261}	—	February 13, 2013	Haleakala	Pan-STARRS 1	·	2.6 km	MPC · JPL
651681	2013 CC_{264}	—	September 15, 2007	Mount Lemmon	Mount Lemmon Survey	·	900 m	MPC · JPL
651682	2013 DJ_{2}	—	April 19, 2006	Anderson Mesa	LONEOS	·	1.2 km	MPC · JPL
651683	2013 DQ_{2}	—	February 9, 2013	Haleakala	Pan-STARRS 1	·	2.5 km	MPC · JPL
651684	2013 DQ_{3}	—	January 19, 2013	Kitt Peak	Spacewatch	·	910 m	MPC · JPL
651685	2013 DL_{5}	—	January 1, 2012	Mount Lemmon	Mount Lemmon Survey	L4	6.4 km	MPC · JPL
651686	2013 DC_{6}	—	February 16, 2013	Kitt Peak	Spacewatch	·	2.5 km	MPC · JPL
651687	2013 DY_{7}	—	September 5, 2008	Kitt Peak	Spacewatch	L4	7.9 km	MPC · JPL
651688	2013 DJ_{8}	—	February 5, 2013	Mount Lemmon	Mount Lemmon Survey	·	2.7 km	MPC · JPL
651689	2013 DG_{9}	—	May 11, 2010	Kitt Peak	Spacewatch	·	1.4 km	MPC · JPL
651690	2013 DM_{10}	—	December 13, 2012	Mount Lemmon	Mount Lemmon Survey	·	3.1 km	MPC · JPL
651691	2013 DK_{11}	—	February 9, 2013	Haleakala	Pan-STARRS 1	·	2.0 km	MPC · JPL
651692	2013 DA_{16}	—	January 25, 2007	Kitt Peak	Spacewatch	EUP	2.5 km	MPC · JPL
651693	2013 DH_{16}	—	February 17, 2013	Nogales	M. Schwartz, P. R. Holvorcem	·	3.0 km	MPC · JPL
651694	2013 DB_{19}	—	January 28, 2017	Haleakala	Pan-STARRS 1	·	920 m	MPC · JPL
651695	2013 DG_{20}	—	February 17, 2013	Mount Lemmon	Mount Lemmon Survey	·	2.3 km	MPC · JPL
651696	2013 DH_{20}	—	February 16, 2013	Mount Lemmon	Mount Lemmon Survey	·	2.2 km	MPC · JPL
651697	2013 DF_{23}	—	February 16, 2013	Mount Lemmon	Mount Lemmon Survey	·	2.4 km	MPC · JPL
651698	2013 ER_{2}	—	October 20, 2011	Mount Lemmon	Mount Lemmon Survey	·	2.0 km	MPC · JPL
651699	2013 EA_{4}	—	February 15, 2013	Haleakala	Pan-STARRS 1	·	2.7 km	MPC · JPL
651700	2013 EA_{8}	—	March 31, 2008	Mount Lemmon	Mount Lemmon Survey	·	2.4 km	MPC · JPL

== 651701–651800 ==
back to top

Designation			Discovery			Properties		Ref
Permanent	Provisional	Named after	Date	Site	Discoverer(s)	Category	Diam.	Ref
651701	2013 EC_{10}	—	March 4, 2013	Haleakala	Pan-STARRS 1	·	2.2 km	MPC · JPL
651702	2013 EC_{11}	—	February 8, 2013	Haleakala	Pan-STARRS 1	·	2.6 km	MPC · JPL
651703	2013 EX_{11}	—	September 23, 2011	Kitt Peak	Spacewatch	·	2.1 km	MPC · JPL
651704	2013 EW_{14}	—	February 8, 2002	Kitt Peak	Deep Ecliptic Survey	THM	2.5 km	MPC · JPL
651705	2013 ER_{16}	—	February 10, 2007	Mount Lemmon	Mount Lemmon Survey	·	3.7 km	MPC · JPL
651706	2013 EA_{17}	—	September 24, 2011	Haleakala	Pan-STARRS 1	·	2.2 km	MPC · JPL
651707	2013 EH_{17}	—	August 23, 2003	Palomar	NEAT	(5)	1.1 km	MPC · JPL
651708	2013 EP_{17}	—	November 3, 2011	Mount Lemmon	Mount Lemmon Survey	·	2.6 km	MPC · JPL
651709	2013 EE_{22}	—	March 5, 2013	Mount Lemmon	Mount Lemmon Survey	NYS	740 m	MPC · JPL
651710	2013 EK_{27}	—	April 14, 2008	Mount Lemmon	Mount Lemmon Survey	·	2.6 km	MPC · JPL
651711	2013 EU_{33}	—	November 2, 2007	Mount Lemmon	Mount Lemmon Survey	·	2.1 km	MPC · JPL
651712	2013 EQ_{35}	—	January 10, 2007	Mount Lemmon	Mount Lemmon Survey	TIR	3.0 km	MPC · JPL
651713	2013 EJ_{36}	—	March 7, 2013	Mount Lemmon	Mount Lemmon Survey	MAS	610 m	MPC · JPL
651714	2013 EJ_{37}	—	December 2, 2008	Mount Lemmon	Mount Lemmon Survey	NYS	900 m	MPC · JPL
651715	2013 EH_{40}	—	September 29, 2011	Mount Lemmon	Mount Lemmon Survey	EOS	1.7 km	MPC · JPL
651716	2013 ES_{40}	—	April 24, 1998	Kitt Peak	Spacewatch	·	2.0 km	MPC · JPL
651717	2013 EZ_{41}	—	December 4, 2008	Mount Lemmon	Mount Lemmon Survey	NYS	950 m	MPC · JPL
651718	2013 EC_{48}	—	February 18, 2013	Kitt Peak	Spacewatch	·	2.9 km	MPC · JPL
651719	2013 EB_{50}	—	February 25, 2007	Mount Lemmon	Mount Lemmon Survey	·	2.5 km	MPC · JPL
651720	2013 EK_{50}	—	March 13, 2002	Kitt Peak	Spacewatch	EUP	3.2 km	MPC · JPL
651721	2013 EK_{51}	—	March 7, 2013	Mount Lemmon	Mount Lemmon Survey	·	2.7 km	MPC · JPL
651722	2013 EM_{51}	—	March 7, 2013	Mount Lemmon	Mount Lemmon Survey	·	1.2 km	MPC · JPL
651723	2013 EG_{55}	—	March 8, 2013	Haleakala	Pan-STARRS 1	·	2.4 km	MPC · JPL
651724	2013 EJ_{58}	—	February 27, 2009	Kitt Peak	Spacewatch	·	1.3 km	MPC · JPL
651725	2013 EA_{60}	—	March 8, 2013	Haleakala	Pan-STARRS 1	·	3.0 km	MPC · JPL
651726	2013 EW_{61}	—	March 8, 2013	Haleakala	Pan-STARRS 1	L4	5.9 km	MPC · JPL
651727	2013 EM_{68}	—	March 7, 2013	Kitt Peak	Spacewatch	·	1.0 km	MPC · JPL
651728	2013 EB_{70}	—	May 20, 2006	Kitt Peak	Spacewatch	MAS	650 m	MPC · JPL
651729	2013 EB_{72}	—	October 5, 2000	Kitt Peak	Spacewatch	·	1.1 km	MPC · JPL
651730	2013 EC_{75}	—	March 12, 2002	Kitt Peak	Spacewatch	·	2.9 km	MPC · JPL
651731	2013 EK_{75}	—	March 7, 2013	Mount Lemmon	Mount Lemmon Survey	·	2.4 km	MPC · JPL
651732	2013 EZ_{75}	—	September 13, 2007	Mount Lemmon	Mount Lemmon Survey	L4	7.5 km	MPC · JPL
651733	2013 EK_{76}	—	February 28, 2008	Mount Lemmon	Mount Lemmon Survey	·	1.8 km	MPC · JPL
651734	2013 EE_{78}	—	March 8, 2013	Haleakala	Pan-STARRS 1	·	1.1 km	MPC · JPL
651735	2013 EX_{79}	—	October 24, 2011	Haleakala	Pan-STARRS 1	LIX	2.8 km	MPC · JPL
651736	2013 EC_{82}	—	March 8, 2013	Haleakala	Pan-STARRS 1	THM	1.9 km	MPC · JPL
651737	2013 EK_{82}	—	March 5, 2013	Kitt Peak	Spacewatch	THB	2.2 km	MPC · JPL
651738	2013 EW_{82}	—	July 26, 2003	Palomar	NEAT	·	3.4 km	MPC · JPL
651739	2013 EM_{83}	—	April 9, 2002	Palomar	NEAT	NYS	1.2 km	MPC · JPL
651740	2013 EM_{86}	—	April 14, 2002	Palomar	NEAT	·	1.4 km	MPC · JPL
651741	2013 ED_{88}	—	March 14, 2002	Anderson Mesa	LONEOS	·	3.1 km	MPC · JPL
651742	2013 EU_{91}	—	September 15, 2006	Kitt Peak	Spacewatch	·	2.1 km	MPC · JPL
651743	2013 EY_{91}	—	March 14, 2004	Palomar	NEAT	·	1.9 km	MPC · JPL
651744	2013 EC_{93}	—	February 14, 2013	Haleakala	Pan-STARRS 1	H	420 m	MPC · JPL
651745	2013 EM_{97}	—	March 8, 2013	Haleakala	Pan-STARRS 1	·	1.5 km	MPC · JPL
651746	2013 EC_{107}	—	December 16, 2007	Lulin	LUSS	·	1.9 km	MPC · JPL
651747	2013 ED_{115}	—	December 13, 2006	Mount Lemmon	Mount Lemmon Survey	·	2.0 km	MPC · JPL
651748	2013 ES_{117}	—	April 11, 2002	Palomar	NEAT	·	2.3 km	MPC · JPL
651749	2013 EB_{119}	—	March 5, 2013	Mount Lemmon	Mount Lemmon Survey	HYG	2.2 km	MPC · JPL
651750	2013 ET_{121}	—	March 15, 2013	Mount Lemmon	Mount Lemmon Survey	MAS	630 m	MPC · JPL
651751	2013 EX_{125}	—	February 23, 2007	Kitt Peak	Spacewatch	·	3.0 km	MPC · JPL
651752	2013 EA_{127}	—	April 20, 2009	Kitt Peak	Spacewatch	·	2.3 km	MPC · JPL
651753	2013 EJ_{127}	—	March 10, 2007	Mount Lemmon	Mount Lemmon Survey	·	2.1 km	MPC · JPL
651754	2013 EK_{131}	—	February 14, 2013	Kitt Peak	Spacewatch	L4	5.5 km	MPC · JPL
651755	2013 EZ_{133}	—	December 20, 2007	Kitt Peak	Spacewatch	·	850 m	MPC · JPL
651756	2013 EG_{140}	—	February 5, 2013	Mount Lemmon	Mount Lemmon Survey	·	1.6 km	MPC · JPL
651757	2013 EH_{141}	—	January 18, 2013	Mount Lemmon	Mount Lemmon Survey	L4	6.2 km	MPC · JPL
651758	2013 EA_{146}	—	September 7, 2008	Mount Lemmon	Mount Lemmon Survey	L4	7.4 km	MPC · JPL
651759	2013 EN_{158}	—	February 27, 2009	Kitt Peak	Spacewatch	·	890 m	MPC · JPL
651760	2013 EK_{159}	—	July 27, 2014	Haleakala	Pan-STARRS 1	(69559)	2.3 km	MPC · JPL
651761	2013 EW_{163}	—	March 5, 2013	Haleakala	Pan-STARRS 1	·	2.4 km	MPC · JPL
651762	2013 EB_{175}	—	March 2, 2013	Mount Lemmon	Mount Lemmon Survey	L4	6.1 km	MPC · JPL
651763	2013 EJ_{176}	—	March 5, 2013	Mount Lemmon	Mount Lemmon Survey	·	990 m	MPC · JPL
651764	2013 FN	—	August 13, 2010	Kitt Peak	Spacewatch	EOS	1.6 km	MPC · JPL
651765	2013 FM_{5}	—	March 8, 2013	Sandlot	G. Hug	·	3.4 km	MPC · JPL
651766	2013 FQ_{14}	—	May 4, 2002	Palomar	NEAT	·	2.8 km	MPC · JPL
651767	2013 FY_{20}	—	March 5, 2013	Haleakala	Pan-STARRS 1	URS	3.0 km	MPC · JPL
651768	2013 FT_{29}	—	May 10, 2004	Kitt Peak	Spacewatch	526	1.9 km	MPC · JPL
651769	2013 FZ_{29}	—	March 13, 2003	Kitt Peak	Spacewatch	KOR	1.2 km	MPC · JPL
651770	2013 FD_{30}	—	March 18, 2009	Kitt Peak	Spacewatch	·	790 m	MPC · JPL
651771	2013 FT_{30}	—	March 31, 2013	Mount Lemmon	Mount Lemmon Survey	·	2.4 km	MPC · JPL
651772	2013 FG_{37}	—	March 17, 2013	Mount Lemmon	Mount Lemmon Survey	NYS	1.1 km	MPC · JPL
651773	2013 GA_{2}	—	October 6, 2004	Kitt Peak	Spacewatch	·	920 m	MPC · JPL
651774	2013 GT_{3}	—	February 24, 2009	Kitt Peak	Spacewatch	·	800 m	MPC · JPL
651775	2013 GX_{6}	—	April 3, 2013	Palomar	Palomar Transient Factory	T_{j} (2.99) · EUP	2.3 km	MPC · JPL
651776	2013 GJ_{10}	—	March 1, 2009	Mount Lemmon	Mount Lemmon Survey	MAS	660 m	MPC · JPL
651777	2013 GQ_{13}	—	February 16, 2002	Cerro Tololo	Deep Lens Survey	·	3.4 km	MPC · JPL
651778	2013 GM_{14}	—	October 24, 2011	Kitt Peak	Spacewatch	·	2.5 km	MPC · JPL
651779	2013 GE_{18}	—	May 3, 2006	Reedy Creek	J. Broughton	·	1.5 km	MPC · JPL
651780	2013 GG_{27}	—	March 7, 2013	Kitt Peak	Spacewatch	NYS	1.1 km	MPC · JPL
651781	2013 GX_{27}	—	March 13, 2013	Palomar	Palomar Transient Factory	·	3.1 km	MPC · JPL
651782	2013 GX_{28}	—	March 13, 2013	Haleakala	Pan-STARRS 1	·	1.6 km	MPC · JPL
651783	2013 GD_{29}	—	October 28, 2005	Mount Lemmon	Mount Lemmon Survey	·	2.6 km	MPC · JPL
651784	2013 GY_{29}	—	September 26, 2003	Apache Point	SDSS Collaboration	·	990 m	MPC · JPL
651785	2013 GN_{36}	—	October 1, 2005	Mount Lemmon	Mount Lemmon Survey	·	1.7 km	MPC · JPL
651786	2013 GW_{39}	—	January 31, 2003	Palomar	NEAT	·	2.2 km	MPC · JPL
651787	2013 GL_{49}	—	January 16, 2008	Mount Lemmon	Mount Lemmon Survey	WIT	970 m	MPC · JPL
651788	2013 GJ_{51}	—	November 11, 2010	Mount Lemmon	Mount Lemmon Survey	EOS	2.0 km	MPC · JPL
651789	2013 GQ_{51}	—	November 18, 2006	Mount Lemmon	Mount Lemmon Survey	EUN	870 m	MPC · JPL
651790	2013 GT_{51}	—	October 19, 2011	Mount Lemmon	Mount Lemmon Survey	·	1.0 km	MPC · JPL
651791	2013 GX_{53}	—	April 10, 2013	Haleakala	Pan-STARRS 1	·	1.7 km	MPC · JPL
651792	2013 GJ_{57}	—	March 18, 2013	Palomar	Palomar Transient Factory	·	1.2 km	MPC · JPL
651793	2013 GF_{64}	—	August 26, 2003	Cerro Tololo	Deep Ecliptic Survey	·	4.0 km	MPC · JPL
651794	2013 GL_{67}	—	May 31, 2008	Kitt Peak	Spacewatch	EUP	3.3 km	MPC · JPL
651795	2013 GU_{67}	—	August 20, 2001	Cerro Tololo	Deep Ecliptic Survey	·	1.9 km	MPC · JPL
651796	2013 GJ_{68}	—	October 20, 2006	Kitt Peak	Deep Ecliptic Survey	·	2.5 km	MPC · JPL
651797	2013 GZ_{71}	—	January 21, 2002	Palomar	NEAT	·	3.1 km	MPC · JPL
651798	2013 GF_{73}	—	April 11, 2002	Palomar	NEAT	·	3.8 km	MPC · JPL
651799	2013 GX_{74}	—	April 10, 2013	Palomar	Palomar Transient Factory	EUP	2.4 km	MPC · JPL
651800	2013 GB_{82}	—	March 16, 2013	Catalina	CSS	LIX	3.6 km	MPC · JPL

== 651801–651900 ==
back to top

Designation			Discovery			Properties		Ref
Permanent	Provisional	Named after	Date	Site	Discoverer(s)	Category	Diam.	Ref
651801	2013 GM_{85}	—	May 12, 2007	Mount Lemmon	Mount Lemmon Survey	SYL	5.0 km	MPC · JPL
651802	2013 GW_{86}	—	April 14, 2013	Mount Lemmon	Mount Lemmon Survey	·	1.1 km	MPC · JPL
651803	2013 GQ_{87}	—	May 7, 2008	Kitt Peak	Spacewatch	EOS	1.5 km	MPC · JPL
651804	2013 GZ_{92}	—	April 29, 2006	Siding Spring	SSS	·	1.3 km	MPC · JPL
651805	2013 GO_{97}	—	February 7, 2003	La Silla	Barbieri, C.	·	1.5 km	MPC · JPL
651806	2013 GO_{101}	—	March 9, 2007	Palomar	NEAT	EOS	2.1 km	MPC · JPL
651807	2013 GD_{102}	—	October 17, 2010	Mount Lemmon	Mount Lemmon Survey	·	2.9 km	MPC · JPL
651808	2013 GD_{103}	—	February 6, 2000	Kitt Peak	M. W. Buie, R. L. Millis	·	1.3 km	MPC · JPL
651809	2013 GO_{103}	—	February 14, 2005	Kitt Peak	Spacewatch	·	1.2 km	MPC · JPL
651810	2013 GH_{104}	—	February 18, 2013	Mount Lemmon	Mount Lemmon Survey	·	2.7 km	MPC · JPL
651811	2013 GT_{105}	—	August 26, 2005	Anderson Mesa	LONEOS	·	1.8 km	MPC · JPL
651812	2013 GO_{107}	—	April 7, 2013	Mount Lemmon	Mount Lemmon Survey	NYS	1.1 km	MPC · JPL
651813	2013 GV_{112}	—	September 22, 2003	Kitt Peak	Spacewatch	·	3.0 km	MPC · JPL
651814	2013 GV_{113}	—	February 1, 2005	Catalina	CSS	·	1.5 km	MPC · JPL
651815	2013 GQ_{119}	—	October 5, 2004	Kitt Peak	Spacewatch	·	3.1 km	MPC · JPL
651816	2013 GA_{122}	—	September 29, 2003	Kitt Peak	Spacewatch	·	1.2 km	MPC · JPL
651817	2013 GC_{127}	—	May 4, 2009	Mount Lemmon	Mount Lemmon Survey	·	780 m	MPC · JPL
651818	2013 GL_{128}	—	April 3, 2013	Palomar	Palomar Transient Factory	·	1.3 km	MPC · JPL
651819	2013 GS_{130}	—	May 22, 2006	Siding Spring	SSS	·	1.0 km	MPC · JPL
651820	2013 GJ_{131}	—	April 13, 2013	Palomar	Palomar Transient Factory	·	3.7 km	MPC · JPL
651821	2013 GO_{131}	—	April 5, 2013	Palomar	Palomar Transient Factory	·	3.6 km	MPC · JPL
651822	2013 GJ_{133}	—	October 18, 2003	Palomar	NEAT	H	530 m	MPC · JPL
651823	2013 GO_{133}	—	October 13, 1999	Apache Point	SDSS Collaboration	·	2.5 km	MPC · JPL
651824	2013 GP_{133}	—	April 2, 2013	Mount Lemmon	Mount Lemmon Survey	·	2.4 km	MPC · JPL
651825	2013 GQ_{138}	—	April 1, 2013	Kitt Peak	Spacewatch	·	2.2 km	MPC · JPL
651826	2013 GY_{139}	—	April 15, 2013	Haleakala	Pan-STARRS 1	·	1.3 km	MPC · JPL
651827	2013 GG_{146}	—	April 13, 2013	Haleakala	Pan-STARRS 1	HNS	800 m	MPC · JPL
651828	2013 GT_{151}	—	April 10, 2013	Mount Lemmon	Mount Lemmon Survey	·	1.3 km	MPC · JPL
651829	2013 GE_{152}	—	April 2, 2013	Mount Lemmon	Mount Lemmon Survey	·	760 m	MPC · JPL
651830	2013 GD_{156}	—	April 10, 2013	Haleakala	Pan-STARRS 1	·	930 m	MPC · JPL
651831	2013 GU_{157}	—	April 10, 2013	Haleakala	Pan-STARRS 1	·	990 m	MPC · JPL
651832	2013 GZ_{158}	—	April 9, 2013	Haleakala	Pan-STARRS 1	·	820 m	MPC · JPL
651833	2013 GA_{159}	—	April 10, 2013	Haleakala	Pan-STARRS 1	·	1.6 km	MPC · JPL
651834	2013 GJ_{165}	—	April 12, 2013	Haleakala	Pan-STARRS 1	·	1.1 km	MPC · JPL
651835	2013 HF_{4}	—	April 4, 2013	Haleakala	Pan-STARRS 1	·	1.0 km	MPC · JPL
651836	2013 HF_{5}	—	April 11, 2013	Oukaïmeden	C. Rinner	·	3.0 km	MPC · JPL
651837	2013 HF_{10}	—	April 14, 2013	Palomar	Palomar Transient Factory	·	3.6 km	MPC · JPL
651838	2013 HY_{10}	—	January 18, 2012	Kitt Peak	Spacewatch	·	3.0 km	MPC · JPL
651839	2013 HC_{14}	—	September 6, 2010	La Sagra	OAM	NYS	1.2 km	MPC · JPL
651840	2013 HX_{14}	—	September 19, 2001	Kitt Peak	Spacewatch	·	1.7 km	MPC · JPL
651841	2013 HU_{15}	—	September 7, 2004	Socorro	LINEAR	·	2.9 km	MPC · JPL
651842	2013 HP_{22}	—	November 27, 2010	Mount Lemmon	Mount Lemmon Survey	·	3.5 km	MPC · JPL
651843	2013 HW_{25}	—	May 15, 2009	Mount Lemmon	Mount Lemmon Survey	EUN	900 m	MPC · JPL
651844	2013 HC_{29}	—	April 16, 2013	Cerro Tololo-DECam	DECam	·	1.8 km	MPC · JPL
651845	2013 HS_{31}	—	February 16, 2002	Palomar	NEAT	TEL	1.4 km	MPC · JPL
651846	2013 HT_{40}	—	March 26, 2008	Mount Lemmon	Mount Lemmon Survey	·	1.6 km	MPC · JPL
651847	2013 HV_{51}	—	October 17, 2010	Mount Lemmon	Mount Lemmon Survey	·	1.4 km	MPC · JPL
651848	2013 HT_{52}	—	October 11, 2010	Mount Lemmon	Mount Lemmon Survey	·	1.3 km	MPC · JPL
651849	2013 HU_{56}	—	April 16, 2013	Cerro Tololo-DECam	DECam	·	2.5 km	MPC · JPL
651850	2013 HR_{62}	—	December 29, 2011	Mount Lemmon	Mount Lemmon Survey	·	2.1 km	MPC · JPL
651851	2013 HK_{66}	—	April 16, 2013	Cerro Tololo-DECam	DECam	·	560 m	MPC · JPL
651852	2013 HL_{74}	—	April 16, 2013	Cerro Tololo-DECam	DECam	·	800 m	MPC · JPL
651853	2013 HW_{81}	—	April 9, 2013	Haleakala	Pan-STARRS 1	·	860 m	MPC · JPL
651854	2013 HF_{83}	—	August 27, 2009	La Sagra	OAM	·	1.6 km	MPC · JPL
651855	2013 HY_{83}	—	October 26, 2006	Lulin	LUSS	EUN	980 m	MPC · JPL
651856	2013 HD_{87}	—	February 9, 2008	Kitt Peak	Spacewatch	·	1.5 km	MPC · JPL
651857	2013 HJ_{94}	—	April 16, 2013	Cerro Tololo-DECam	DECam	·	980 m	MPC · JPL
651858	2013 HG_{99}	—	April 9, 2013	Haleakala	Pan-STARRS 1	·	770 m	MPC · JPL
651859	2013 HL_{103}	—	September 29, 2005	Mount Lemmon	Mount Lemmon Survey	·	1.6 km	MPC · JPL
651860	2013 HV_{132}	—	January 26, 2012	Mount Lemmon	Mount Lemmon Survey	(5)	890 m	MPC · JPL
651861	2013 HP_{157}	—	April 16, 2013	Haleakala	Pan-STARRS 1	·	890 m	MPC · JPL
651862	2013 HW_{157}	—	February 16, 2012	Haleakala	Pan-STARRS 1	·	2.4 km	MPC · JPL
651863	2013 HL_{158}	—	April 21, 2013	Haleakala	Pan-STARRS 1	·	1.5 km	MPC · JPL
651864	2013 HA_{162}	—	April 17, 2013	Haleakala	Pan-STARRS 1	·	800 m	MPC · JPL
651865	2013 HR_{163}	—	April 19, 2013	Haleakala	Pan-STARRS 1	HNS	850 m	MPC · JPL
651866	2013 HQ_{165}	—	April 18, 2013	Mount Lemmon	Mount Lemmon Survey	·	1.3 km	MPC · JPL
651867	2013 JV_{5}	—	May 4, 2013	Haleakala	Pan-STARRS 1	·	660 m	MPC · JPL
651868	2013 JL_{7}	—	March 9, 2005	Mount Lemmon	Mount Lemmon Survey	·	960 m	MPC · JPL
651869	2013 JW_{10}	—	April 13, 2013	Haleakala	Pan-STARRS 1	V	570 m	MPC · JPL
651870	2013 JK_{15}	—	May 10, 2013	Haleakala	Pan-STARRS 1	·	2.7 km	MPC · JPL
651871	2013 JE_{23}	—	March 11, 2005	Kitt Peak	Spacewatch	·	1.0 km	MPC · JPL
651872	2013 JE_{33}	—	April 10, 2013	Mount Lemmon	Mount Lemmon Survey	·	1.5 km	MPC · JPL
651873	2013 JL_{37}	—	March 11, 2007	Kitt Peak	Spacewatch	·	3.2 km	MPC · JPL
651874	2013 JD_{50}	—	January 19, 2005	Kitt Peak	Spacewatch	NYS	940 m	MPC · JPL
651875	2013 JQ_{50}	—	April 12, 2013	Haleakala	Pan-STARRS 1	·	520 m	MPC · JPL
651876	2013 JU_{59}	—	September 28, 2009	Mount Lemmon	Mount Lemmon Survey	·	2.2 km	MPC · JPL
651877	2013 JC_{60}	—	October 21, 2006	Mount Lemmon	Mount Lemmon Survey	·	910 m	MPC · JPL
651878	2013 JD_{76}	—	May 12, 2013	Mount Lemmon	Mount Lemmon Survey	·	1.1 km	MPC · JPL
651879	2013 JK_{80}	—	May 15, 2013	Haleakala	Pan-STARRS 1	·	2.3 km	MPC · JPL
651880	2013 JZ_{80}	—	May 12, 2013	Mount Lemmon	Mount Lemmon Survey	·	2.9 km	MPC · JPL
651881	2013 KO	—	August 5, 2005	Palomar	NEAT	·	1.3 km	MPC · JPL
651882	2013 KR_{4}	—	May 16, 2013	Mount Lemmon	Mount Lemmon Survey	·	860 m	MPC · JPL
651883	2013 KZ_{11}	—	September 24, 2004	Kitt Peak	Spacewatch	·	2.1 km	MPC · JPL
651884	2013 KZ_{16}	—	June 11, 2005	Junk Bond	D. Healy	·	830 m	MPC · JPL
651885	2013 KO_{21}	—	May 16, 2013	Haleakala	Pan-STARRS 1	·	1.5 km	MPC · JPL
651886	2013 LN_{4}	—	October 19, 2003	Kitt Peak	Spacewatch	THM	2.4 km	MPC · JPL
651887	2013 LQ_{17}	—	August 18, 2009	Kitt Peak	Spacewatch	KOR	1.6 km	MPC · JPL
651888	2013 LY_{30}	—	May 16, 2013	Mount Lemmon	Mount Lemmon Survey	·	950 m	MPC · JPL
651889	2013 LV_{42}	—	June 7, 2013	Haleakala	Pan-STARRS 1	·	1.1 km	MPC · JPL
651890	2013 LE_{43}	—	June 5, 2013	Mount Lemmon	Mount Lemmon Survey	(5)	800 m	MPC · JPL
651891	2013 MU_{3}	—	June 14, 2005	Mount Lemmon	Mount Lemmon Survey	·	960 m	MPC · JPL
651892	2013 MP_{10}	—	June 30, 2013	Haleakala	Pan-STARRS 1	·	1.2 km	MPC · JPL
651893	2013 MU_{11}	—	July 31, 2009	Catalina	CSS	·	1.9 km	MPC · JPL
651894	2013 ME_{13}	—	June 20, 2013	Haleakala	Pan-STARRS 1	·	1.8 km	MPC · JPL
651895	2013 MU_{13}	—	February 16, 2012	Haleakala	Pan-STARRS 1	·	990 m	MPC · JPL
651896	2013 MD_{18}	—	June 18, 2013	Haleakala	Pan-STARRS 1	·	1.3 km	MPC · JPL
651897	2013 MF_{18}	—	June 18, 2013	Haleakala	Pan-STARRS 1	·	1.8 km	MPC · JPL
651898	2013 MH_{19}	—	June 30, 2013	Haleakala	Pan-STARRS 1	·	1.3 km	MPC · JPL
651899	2013 ML_{20}	—	June 30, 2013	Haleakala	Pan-STARRS 1	·	1.4 km	MPC · JPL
651900	2013 MO_{20}	—	June 18, 2013	Haleakala	Pan-STARRS 1	·	1.1 km	MPC · JPL

== 651901–652000 ==
back to top

Designation			Discovery			Properties		Ref
Permanent	Provisional	Named after	Date	Site	Discoverer(s)	Category	Diam.	Ref
651901	2013 NB_{5}	—	April 22, 2007	Catalina	CSS	·	2.5 km	MPC · JPL
651902	2013 NE_{13}	—	February 26, 2012	Haleakala	Pan-STARRS 1	·	1.0 km	MPC · JPL
651903	2013 NW_{15}	—	July 9, 2013	Haleakala	Pan-STARRS 1	·	590 m	MPC · JPL
651904	2013 NF_{17}	—	August 31, 2000	Kitt Peak	Spacewatch	·	500 m	MPC · JPL
651905	2013 NM_{17}	—	August 6, 2005	Palomar	NEAT	·	890 m	MPC · JPL
651906	2013 NW_{18}	—	November 6, 2005	Kitt Peak	Spacewatch	·	1.1 km	MPC · JPL
651907	2013 NW_{19}	—	May 24, 2001	Apache Point	SDSS Collaboration	·	2.7 km	MPC · JPL
651908	2013 NT_{23}	—	July 15, 2013	Haleakala	Pan-STARRS 1	·	1.1 km	MPC · JPL
651909	2013 NO_{24}	—	July 1, 2013	Haleakala	Pan-STARRS 1	·	950 m	MPC · JPL
651910	2013 NB_{25}	—	June 20, 2013	Haleakala	Pan-STARRS 1	BRA	1.1 km	MPC · JPL
651911	2013 NP_{25}	—	July 14, 2013	Haleakala	Pan-STARRS 1	·	1.2 km	MPC · JPL
651912	2013 NT_{25}	—	July 14, 2013	Haleakala	Pan-STARRS 1	·	1.5 km	MPC · JPL
651913	2013 NF_{27}	—	July 14, 2013	Haleakala	Pan-STARRS 1	·	1.4 km	MPC · JPL
651914	2013 NJ_{27}	—	June 20, 2013	Mount Lemmon	Mount Lemmon Survey	·	1.3 km	MPC · JPL
651915	2013 NR_{32}	—	September 20, 2009	Kitt Peak	Spacewatch	·	1.3 km	MPC · JPL
651916	2013 NT_{32}	—	July 15, 2013	Haleakala	Pan-STARRS 1	AGN	880 m	MPC · JPL
651917	2013 NF_{42}	—	July 2, 2013	Haleakala	Pan-STARRS 1	·	1.6 km	MPC · JPL
651918	2013 NU_{47}	—	July 13, 2013	Haleakala	Pan-STARRS 1	MRX	670 m	MPC · JPL
651919	2013 NL_{52}	—	July 15, 2013	Haleakala	Pan-STARRS 1	·	1.4 km	MPC · JPL
651920	2013 NO_{57}	—	July 13, 2013	Haleakala	Pan-STARRS 1	·	1.4 km	MPC · JPL
651921	2013 NL_{59}	—	July 6, 2013	Haleakala	Pan-STARRS 1	·	1.4 km	MPC · JPL
651922	2013 NR_{67}	—	July 14, 2013	Haleakala	Pan-STARRS 1	·	1.1 km	MPC · JPL
651923	2013 NE_{71}	—	September 30, 2009	Mount Lemmon	Mount Lemmon Survey	·	1.2 km	MPC · JPL
651924	2013 ON_{6}	—	July 28, 2013	Haleakala	Pan-STARRS 1	·	1.4 km	MPC · JPL
651925	2013 OM_{8}	—	November 9, 2007	Mount Lemmon	Mount Lemmon Survey	·	700 m	MPC · JPL
651926	2013 OS_{8}	—	July 28, 2013	Haleakala	Pan-STARRS 1	EOS	1.6 km	MPC · JPL
651927	2013 OJ_{12}	—	September 17, 2009	Mount Lemmon	Mount Lemmon Survey	·	1.1 km	MPC · JPL
651928	2013 PE	—	February 20, 2012	Haleakala	Pan-STARRS 1	BRG	1.3 km	MPC · JPL
651929	2013 PJ_{4}	—	October 11, 2006	Palomar	NEAT	·	1.3 km	MPC · JPL
651930	2013 PV_{7}	—	October 24, 2005	Kitt Peak	Spacewatch	·	1.3 km	MPC · JPL
651931	2013 PY_{11}	—	August 5, 2013	Elena Remote	Oreshko, A.	·	1.3 km	MPC · JPL
651932	2013 PS_{12}	—	October 27, 2003	Anderson Mesa	LONEOS	EOS	2.7 km	MPC · JPL
651933	2013 PJ_{16}	—	June 8, 2013	Mount Lemmon	Mount Lemmon Survey	·	1.7 km	MPC · JPL
651934	2013 PD_{20}	—	August 9, 2013	Kitt Peak	Spacewatch	·	2.2 km	MPC · JPL
651935	2013 PK_{21}	—	March 21, 2006	Mount Lemmon	Mount Lemmon Survey	·	3.0 km	MPC · JPL
651936	2013 PJ_{24}	—	November 17, 2009	Mount Lemmon	Mount Lemmon Survey	AGN	850 m	MPC · JPL
651937	2013 PV_{27}	—	November 3, 2004	Kitt Peak	Spacewatch	AGN	860 m	MPC · JPL
651938	2013 PS_{31}	—	August 28, 2006	Catalina	CSS	·	780 m	MPC · JPL
651939	2013 PQ_{32}	—	September 22, 2009	Mount Lemmon	Mount Lemmon Survey	·	1.6 km	MPC · JPL
651940	2013 PX_{35}	—	August 5, 2013	ESA OGS	ESA OGS	PHO	930 m	MPC · JPL
651941	2013 PH_{36}	—	September 30, 2005	Kitt Peak	Spacewatch	ADE	1.6 km	MPC · JPL
651942	2013 PC_{37}	—	December 2, 2010	Mount Lemmon	Mount Lemmon Survey	·	450 m	MPC · JPL
651943	2013 PL_{44}	—	August 8, 2013	Haleakala	Pan-STARRS 1	HNS	850 m	MPC · JPL
651944	2013 PR_{45}	—	July 15, 2013	Haleakala	Pan-STARRS 1	·	1.1 km	MPC · JPL
651945	2013 PX_{46}	—	June 20, 2013	Haleakala	Pan-STARRS 1	·	680 m	MPC · JPL
651946	2013 PN_{50}	—	April 13, 2004	Palomar	NEAT	·	1.3 km	MPC · JPL
651947	2013 PS_{52}	—	December 25, 2005	Mount Lemmon	Mount Lemmon Survey	·	1.4 km	MPC · JPL
651948	2013 PV_{54}	—	August 9, 2013	Haleakala	Pan-STARRS 1	·	1.3 km	MPC · JPL
651949	2013 PT_{55}	—	February 5, 2011	Haleakala	Pan-STARRS 1	·	1.3 km	MPC · JPL
651950	2013 PD_{63}	—	November 5, 2007	Kitt Peak	Spacewatch	·	510 m	MPC · JPL
651951	2013 PY_{78}	—	August 9, 2013	Kitt Peak	Spacewatch	·	1.9 km	MPC · JPL
651952	2013 PU_{81}	—	August 14, 2013	Haleakala	Pan-STARRS 1	·	1.7 km	MPC · JPL
651953	2013 PD_{83}	—	August 15, 2013	Haleakala	Pan-STARRS 1	AGN	750 m	MPC · JPL
651954	2013 PY_{98}	—	August 14, 2013	Haleakala	Pan-STARRS 1	AGN	960 m	MPC · JPL
651955	2013 PQ_{100}	—	August 15, 2013	Haleakala	Pan-STARRS 1	·	1.4 km	MPC · JPL
651956	2013 PX_{100}	—	August 15, 2013	Haleakala	Pan-STARRS 1	·	1.2 km	MPC · JPL
651957	2013 PZ_{100}	—	August 15, 2013	Haleakala	Pan-STARRS 1	PAD	1.2 km	MPC · JPL
651958	2013 PG_{106}	—	August 1, 2013	Haleakala	Pan-STARRS 1	·	1.3 km	MPC · JPL
651959	2013 PY_{121}	—	April 27, 2012	Haleakala	Pan-STARRS 1	·	1.4 km	MPC · JPL
651960	2013 PO_{123}	—	August 9, 2013	Haleakala	Pan-STARRS 1	·	1.1 km	MPC · JPL
651961	2013 PK_{125}	—	August 9, 2013	Kitt Peak	Spacewatch	·	1.3 km	MPC · JPL
651962	2013 QJ_{7}	—	August 6, 2002	Palomar	NEAT	·	1.1 km	MPC · JPL
651963	2013 QX_{18}	—	August 9, 2013	Haleakala	Pan-STARRS 1	·	1.4 km	MPC · JPL
651964	2013 QL_{25}	—	October 4, 2006	Mount Lemmon	Mount Lemmon Survey	3:2	4.9 km	MPC · JPL
651965	2013 QT_{27}	—	September 14, 2007	Kitt Peak	Spacewatch	·	3.1 km	MPC · JPL
651966	2013 QU_{30}	—	August 29, 2013	Haleakala	Pan-STARRS 1	·	1.2 km	MPC · JPL
651967	2013 QW_{30}	—	September 19, 2003	Haleakala	NEAT	·	630 m	MPC · JPL
651968	2013 QG_{33}	—	August 12, 2013	Haleakala	Pan-STARRS 1	·	1.5 km	MPC · JPL
651969	2013 QQ_{37}	—	August 27, 2013	Haleakala	Pan-STARRS 1	MAR	970 m	MPC · JPL
651970	2013 QY_{37}	—	October 29, 2005	Kitt Peak	Spacewatch	ADE	1.7 km	MPC · JPL
651971	2013 QB_{38}	—	September 15, 2002	Anderson Mesa	LONEOS	TIR	3.1 km	MPC · JPL
651972	2013 QG_{40}	—	August 10, 2013	Kitt Peak	Spacewatch	EUN	1.1 km	MPC · JPL
651973	2013 QS_{40}	—	July 30, 2013	Kitt Peak	Spacewatch	·	630 m	MPC · JPL
651974	2013 QK_{44}	—	October 22, 2009	Mount Lemmon	Mount Lemmon Survey	NEM	1.7 km	MPC · JPL
651975	2013 QJ_{45}	—	April 26, 2008	Kitt Peak	Spacewatch	·	1.6 km	MPC · JPL
651976	2013 QY_{46}	—	September 25, 2005	Uccle	P. De Cat	H	500 m	MPC · JPL
651977	2013 QY_{50}	—	February 25, 2011	Mount Lemmon	Mount Lemmon Survey	·	2.5 km	MPC · JPL
651978	2013 QR_{51}	—	August 11, 2013	Palomar	Palomar Transient Factory	·	1.7 km	MPC · JPL
651979	2013 QR_{58}	—	April 5, 2003	Kitt Peak	Spacewatch	·	610 m	MPC · JPL
651980	2013 QY_{59}	—	August 26, 2013	Haleakala	Pan-STARRS 1	·	1.4 km	MPC · JPL
651981	2013 QP_{61}	—	March 16, 2012	Mount Lemmon	Mount Lemmon Survey	·	1.4 km	MPC · JPL
651982	2013 QD_{65}	—	July 30, 2008	Mount Lemmon	Mount Lemmon Survey	LIX	4.9 km	MPC · JPL
651983	2013 QA_{71}	—	December 1, 2005	Kitt Peak	Wasserman, L. H., Millis, R. L.	·	1.8 km	MPC · JPL
651984	2013 QS_{71}	—	August 26, 2013	Haleakala	Pan-STARRS 1	·	1.5 km	MPC · JPL
651985	2013 QS_{72}	—	August 26, 2013	Haleakala	Pan-STARRS 1	·	1.6 km	MPC · JPL
651986	2013 QO_{73}	—	May 24, 2006	Mount Lemmon	Mount Lemmon Survey	·	780 m	MPC · JPL
651987	2013 QL_{78}	—	January 12, 2008	Kitt Peak	Spacewatch	·	610 m	MPC · JPL
651988	2013 QN_{86}	—	September 25, 2009	Kitt Peak	Spacewatch	·	1.1 km	MPC · JPL
651989	2013 QJ_{89}	—	August 27, 2013	Haleakala	Pan-STARRS 1	EOS	1.4 km	MPC · JPL
651990	2013 QP_{91}	—	August 29, 2013	Haleakala	Pan-STARRS 1	HOF	2.1 km	MPC · JPL
651991	2013 QQ_{91}	—	September 25, 2008	Kitt Peak	Spacewatch	·	2.5 km	MPC · JPL
651992	2013 QH_{95}	—	August 25, 2003	Palomar	NEAT	·	2.0 km	MPC · JPL
651993	2013 QS_{95}	—	August 12, 2013	Haleakala	Pan-STARRS 1	T_{j} (2.95) · 3:2	4.1 km	MPC · JPL
651994	2013 QM_{100}	—	August 28, 2013	Mount Lemmon	Mount Lemmon Survey	AGN	850 m	MPC · JPL
651995	2013 QY_{100}	—	August 26, 2013	Haleakala	Pan-STARRS 1	·	1.7 km	MPC · JPL
651996	2013 QV_{102}	—	August 29, 2013	Haleakala	Pan-STARRS 1	·	1.8 km	MPC · JPL
651997	2013 RY_{2}	—	April 20, 2012	Kitt Peak	Spacewatch	·	910 m	MPC · JPL
651998	2013 RE_{5}	—	September 15, 2004	Kitt Peak	Spacewatch	WIT	770 m	MPC · JPL
651999	2013 RF_{8}	—	January 31, 2006	Kitt Peak	Spacewatch	·	1.3 km	MPC · JPL
652000	2013 RG_{9}	—	October 29, 2005	Catalina	CSS	·	1.4 km	MPC · JPL

back to top

== Meaning of names ==
As minor planet discoveries are confirmed, they are given a permanent number by the IAU's Minor Planet Center (MPC), and the discoverers can then submit names for them, following the IAU's naming conventions. The list below concerns those minor planets in the specified number-range that have received names, and explains the meanings of those names.

Official naming citations of newly named small Solar System bodies are approved and published in a bulletin by IAU's Working Group for Small Bodies Nomenclature (WGSBN). Before May 2021, citations were published in MPC's Minor Planet Circulars for many decades. Recent citations can also be found on the JPL Small-Body Database (SBDB). Until his death in 2016, German astronomer Lutz D. Schmadel compiled these citations into the Dictionary of Minor Planet Names (DMP) and regularly updated the collection.

Based on Paul Herget's The Names of the Minor Planets, Schmadel also researched the unclear origin of numerous asteroids, most of which had been named prior to World War II. This article incorporates text from this source, which is in the public domain: SBDB New namings may only be added to this list below after official publication as the preannouncement of names is condemned. The WGSBN publishes a comprehensive guideline for the naming rules of non-cometary small Solar System bodies.

Named minor planet	Provisional	This minor planet was named for...	Ref · Catalog
651104 Bobola	2012 VY_{87}	Andrzej Bobola, Polish Jesuit priest who studied in Braniewo and Vilnius.	IAU · 651104
651168 Petrini	2012 WZ_{41}	Sr. Raffaella Petrini, Italian religious member of the Franciscan Sisters of the Eucharist.	IAU · 651168
651370 Kolen	2013 AZ_{51}	Jan Kolen (b. 1962), a Dutch Professor in Landscape Archaeology and Cultural Heritage at Leiden University.	IAU · 651370
