= List of minor planets: 857001–858000 =

The following is a partial list of minor planets, running from minor-planet number 857001 through 858000, inclusive. The primary data for this and other partial lists is based on JPL's "Small-Body Orbital Elements" and data available from the Minor Planet Center. Critical list information is also provided by the MPC, unless otherwise specified from Lowell Observatory. A detailed description of the table's columns and additional sources are given on the main page including a complete list of every page in this series, and a statistical break-up on the dynamical classification of minor planets.

Also see the summary list of all named bodies in numerical and alphabetical order, and the corresponding naming citations for the number range of this particular list. New namings may only be added to this list after official publication, as the preannouncement of names is condemned by the Working Group for Small Bodies Nomenclature of the International Astronomical Union.

Near-Earth obj.	MBA (inner)	MBA (outer)	Centaur
Mars-crosser	MBA (middle)	Jupiter trojan	Trans-Neptunian obj.
Unclassified

== 857001–857100 ==
Designation			Discovery			Properties		Ref
Permanent	Provisional	Named after	Date	Site	Discoverer(s)	Category	Diam.	Ref
857001	2012 BN_{161}	—	January 19, 2012	Haleakala	Pan-STARRS 1	T_{j} (2.98)	2.7 km	MPC · JPL
857002	2012 BQ_{161}	—	January 30, 2012	Haleakala	Pan-STARRS 1	·	2.1 km	MPC · JPL
857003	2012 BE_{163}	—	January 19, 2012	Catalina	CSS	H	510 m	MPC · JPL
857004	2012 BK_{163}	—	January 21, 2012	Kitt Peak	Spacewatch	·	840 m	MPC · JPL
857005	2012 BN_{163}	—	September 16, 2017	Haleakala	Pan-STARRS 1	·	590 m	MPC · JPL
857006	2012 BP_{163}	—	January 21, 2012	Kitt Peak	Spacewatch	·	690 m	MPC · JPL
857007	2012 BU_{163}	—	May 15, 2013	Haleakala	Pan-STARRS 1	EUN	840 m	MPC · JPL
857008	2012 BV_{164}	—	January 24, 2012	Sandlot	G. Hug	·	1.8 km	MPC · JPL
857009	2012 BG_{165}	—	January 27, 2012	Mount Lemmon	Mount Lemmon Survey	·	450 m	MPC · JPL
857010	2012 BH_{165}	—	January 19, 2012	Haleakala	Pan-STARRS 1	(5)	880 m	MPC · JPL
857011	2012 BA_{166}	—	January 19, 2012	Haleakala	Pan-STARRS 1	·	1.5 km	MPC · JPL
857012	2012 BC_{166}	—	January 19, 2012	Haleakala	Pan-STARRS 1	PHO	610 m	MPC · JPL
857013	2012 BE_{169}	—	January 19, 2012	Haleakala	Pan-STARRS 1	·	720 m	MPC · JPL
857014	2012 BE_{170}	—	January 20, 2012	Kitt Peak	Spacewatch	·	710 m	MPC · JPL
857015	2012 BL_{170}	—	January 26, 2012	Haleakala	Pan-STARRS 1	·	660 m	MPC · JPL
857016	2012 BX_{170}	—	December 25, 2011	Mount Lemmon	Mount Lemmon Survey	·	2.0 km	MPC · JPL
857017	2012 BA_{171}	—	January 19, 2012	Haleakala	Pan-STARRS 1	TIR	2.0 km	MPC · JPL
857018	2012 BG_{171}	—	January 18, 2012	Mount Lemmon	Mount Lemmon Survey	·	1.3 km	MPC · JPL
857019	2012 BH_{172}	—	June 2, 2013	Siding Spring	SSS	·	2.0 km	MPC · JPL
857020	2012 BS_{175}	—	January 27, 2012	Mount Lemmon	Mount Lemmon Survey	·	2.3 km	MPC · JPL
857021	2012 BQ_{177}	—	January 18, 2012	Mount Lemmon	Mount Lemmon Survey	EOS	1.3 km	MPC · JPL
857022	2012 BS_{177}	—	January 19, 2012	Haleakala	Pan-STARRS 1	·	650 m	MPC · JPL
857023	2012 BF_{178}	—	January 21, 2012	Haleakala	Pan-STARRS 1	·	1.7 km	MPC · JPL
857024	2012 BH_{178}	—	January 26, 2012	Mount Lemmon	Mount Lemmon Survey	·	2.3 km	MPC · JPL
857025	2012 BO_{178}	—	January 19, 2012	Haleakala	Pan-STARRS 1	·	1.7 km	MPC · JPL
857026	2012 BA_{179}	—	January 26, 2012	Haleakala	Pan-STARRS 1	EOS	1.3 km	MPC · JPL
857027	2012 BG_{179}	—	January 26, 2012	Haleakala	Pan-STARRS 1	·	550 m	MPC · JPL
857028	2012 BK_{179}	—	January 20, 2012	Haleakala	Pan-STARRS 1	·	2.0 km	MPC · JPL
857029	2012 BL_{179}	—	January 26, 2012	Haleakala	Pan-STARRS 1	L4	7.4 km	MPC · JPL
857030	2012 BF_{180}	—	January 27, 2012	Mount Lemmon	Mount Lemmon Survey	·	1.3 km	MPC · JPL
857031	2012 BG_{180}	—	January 27, 2012	Mount Lemmon	Mount Lemmon Survey	·	1.3 km	MPC · JPL
857032	2012 BR_{180}	—	January 19, 2012	Kitt Peak	Spacewatch	·	1.1 km	MPC · JPL
857033	2012 BX_{180}	—	January 27, 2012	Mount Lemmon	Mount Lemmon Survey	·	1.3 km	MPC · JPL
857034	2012 BV_{182}	—	January 18, 2012	Kitt Peak	Spacewatch	·	490 m	MPC · JPL
857035	2012 BA_{183}	—	January 26, 2012	Mount Lemmon	Mount Lemmon Survey	·	2.4 km	MPC · JPL
857036	2012 BG_{183}	—	January 19, 2012	Haleakala	Pan-STARRS 1	HYG	1.7 km	MPC · JPL
857037	2012 BY_{184}	—	January 26, 2012	Mount Lemmon	Mount Lemmon Survey	·	1.8 km	MPC · JPL
857038	2012 BW_{185}	—	January 26, 2012	Haleakala	Pan-STARRS 1	L4	6.0 km	MPC · JPL
857039	2012 BV_{187}	—	January 26, 2012	Mount Lemmon	Mount Lemmon Survey	·	1.4 km	MPC · JPL
857040	2012 BG_{188}	—	January 29, 2012	Kitt Peak	Spacewatch	·	900 m	MPC · JPL
857041	2012 BO_{188}	—	January 29, 2012	Mount Lemmon	Mount Lemmon Survey	·	820 m	MPC · JPL
857042	2012 BB_{190}	—	January 27, 2012	Mount Lemmon	Mount Lemmon Survey	·	2.0 km	MPC · JPL
857043	2012 BC_{190}	—	January 30, 2012	Kitt Peak	Spacewatch	·	2.1 km	MPC · JPL
857044	2012 BT_{192}	—	January 26, 2012	Mount Lemmon	Mount Lemmon Survey	·	2.2 km	MPC · JPL
857045	2012 CW_{2}	—	January 19, 2012	Kitt Peak	Spacewatch	·	800 m	MPC · JPL
857046	2012 CM_{6}	—	February 3, 2012	Haleakala	Pan-STARRS 1	·	3.2 km	MPC · JPL
857047	2012 CE_{9}	—	February 3, 2012	Haleakala	Pan-STARRS 1	PHO	730 m	MPC · JPL
857048	2012 CC_{14}	—	January 19, 2012	Kitt Peak	Spacewatch	·	2.4 km	MPC · JPL
857049	2012 CS_{16}	—	January 21, 2012	Kitt Peak	Spacewatch	MAS	500 m	MPC · JPL
857050	2012 CE_{20}	—	October 24, 2003	Kitt Peak	Spacewatch	·	790 m	MPC · JPL
857051	2012 CE_{22}	—	October 31, 2007	Mount Lemmon	Mount Lemmon Survey	·	640 m	MPC · JPL
857052	2012 CS_{24}	—	January 18, 2012	Kitt Peak	Spacewatch	·	760 m	MPC · JPL
857053	2012 CQ_{25}	—	January 19, 2012	Haleakala	Pan-STARRS 1	·	1.5 km	MPC · JPL
857054	2012 CQ_{29}	—	February 3, 2012	Haleakala	Pan-STARRS 1	EOS	1.3 km	MPC · JPL
857055	2012 CM_{32}	—	January 18, 2012	Kitt Peak	Spacewatch	·	1.9 km	MPC · JPL
857056	2012 CE_{35}	—	February 3, 2012	Haleakala	Pan-STARRS 1	·	1.6 km	MPC · JPL
857057	2012 CN_{35}	—	March 9, 2008	Mount Lemmon	Mount Lemmon Survey	MAR	670 m	MPC · JPL
857058	2012 CF_{36}	—	January 21, 2012	Kitt Peak	Spacewatch	MAS	480 m	MPC · JPL
857059	2012 CT_{37}	—	January 19, 2012	Mount Lemmon	Mount Lemmon Survey	·	1.9 km	MPC · JPL
857060	2012 CD_{42}	—	January 20, 2012	Kitt Peak	Spacewatch	(18466)	1.5 km	MPC · JPL
857061	2012 CU_{43}	—	January 18, 2012	Kitt Peak	Spacewatch	·	2.3 km	MPC · JPL
857062	2012 CW_{49}	—	October 17, 2003	Kitt Peak	Spacewatch	·	820 m	MPC · JPL
857063	2012 CZ_{51}	—	January 19, 2012	Haleakala	Pan-STARRS 1	·	2.0 km	MPC · JPL
857064	2012 CF_{58}	—	October 31, 2010	Mount Lemmon	Mount Lemmon Survey	EOS	1.4 km	MPC · JPL
857065	2012 CC_{61}	—	February 1, 2012	Mount Lemmon	Mount Lemmon Survey	·	2.0 km	MPC · JPL
857066	2012 CV_{61}	—	February 1, 2012	Kitt Peak	Spacewatch	·	1.0 km	MPC · JPL
857067	2012 CF_{62}	—	February 1, 2012	Kitt Peak	Spacewatch	EOS	1.3 km	MPC · JPL
857068	2012 CP_{62}	—	February 3, 2012	Mount Lemmon	Mount Lemmon Survey	H	290 m	MPC · JPL
857069	2012 CH_{63}	—	March 21, 2017	Haleakala	Pan-STARRS 1	·	1.4 km	MPC · JPL
857070	2012 CX_{63}	—	August 31, 2014	Haleakala	Pan-STARRS 1	TIR	1.8 km	MPC · JPL
857071	2012 CD_{64}	—	February 1, 2012	Mount Lemmon	Mount Lemmon Survey	·	1.3 km	MPC · JPL
857072	2012 CH_{64}	—	February 3, 2012	Haleakala	Pan-STARRS 1	·	550 m	MPC · JPL
857073	2012 CU_{64}	—	October 9, 2015	Haleakala	Pan-STARRS 1	·	1.4 km	MPC · JPL
857074	2012 CV_{64}	—	July 8, 2014	Haleakala	Pan-STARRS 1	EOS	1.3 km	MPC · JPL
857075	2012 CZ_{64}	—	March 22, 2018	Mount Lemmon	Mount Lemmon Survey	LIX	2.5 km	MPC · JPL
857076	2012 CB_{65}	—	April 20, 2017	Haleakala	Pan-STARRS 1	·	1.1 km	MPC · JPL
857077	2012 CB_{67}	—	February 14, 2012	Haleakala	Pan-STARRS 1	·	1.4 km	MPC · JPL
857078	2012 CH_{67}	—	February 1, 2012	Catalina	CSS	H	430 m	MPC · JPL
857079	2012 CJ_{67}	—	February 11, 2012	Mount Lemmon	Mount Lemmon Survey	EOS	1.3 km	MPC · JPL
857080	2012 CL_{67}	—	February 14, 2012	Haleakala	Pan-STARRS 1	·	790 m	MPC · JPL
857081	2012 CQ_{68}	—	February 15, 2012	Haleakala	Pan-STARRS 1	EOS	1.4 km	MPC · JPL
857082	2012 CT_{68}	—	February 15, 2012	Haleakala	Pan-STARRS 1	·	1.8 km	MPC · JPL
857083	2012 CO_{70}	—	January 26, 2012	Mount Lemmon	Mount Lemmon Survey	·	700 m	MPC · JPL
857084	2012 CP_{70}	—	January 25, 2012	La Sagra	OAM	·	2.5 km	MPC · JPL
857085	2012 CP_{71}	—	February 1, 2012	Mount Lemmon	Mount Lemmon Survey	·	560 m	MPC · JPL
857086	2012 CS_{73}	—	February 14, 2012	Haleakala	Pan-STARRS 1	·	690 m	MPC · JPL
857087	2012 CE_{76}	—	February 15, 2012	Haleakala	Pan-STARRS 1	·	1.7 km	MPC · JPL
857088	2012 CF_{76}	—	February 3, 2012	Haleakala	Pan-STARRS 1	·	2.5 km	MPC · JPL
857089	2012 DZ_{1}	—	March 28, 2009	Kitt Peak	Spacewatch	·	510 m	MPC · JPL
857090	2012 DE_{3}	—	February 16, 2012	Haleakala	Pan-STARRS 1	·	760 m	MPC · JPL
857091	2012 DS_{6}	—	December 12, 2006	Palomar	NEAT	·	1.4 km	MPC · JPL
857092	2012 DV_{6}	—	January 22, 2012	Haleakala	Pan-STARRS 1	H	340 m	MPC · JPL
857093	2012 DC_{10}	—	January 25, 2012	Kitt Peak	Spacewatch	NYS	840 m	MPC · JPL
857094	2012 DD_{10}	—	February 13, 2012	Kitt Peak	Spacewatch	·	2.2 km	MPC · JPL
857095	2012 DG_{12}	—	January 30, 2012	Kitt Peak	Spacewatch	·	1.6 km	MPC · JPL
857096	2012 DO_{13}	—	February 13, 2008	Kitt Peak	Spacewatch	·	830 m	MPC · JPL
857097	2012 DJ_{20}	—	January 19, 2012	Haleakala	Pan-STARRS 1	·	840 m	MPC · JPL
857098	2012 DM_{24}	—	February 21, 2012	Kitt Peak	Spacewatch	·	450 m	MPC · JPL
857099	2012 DN_{33}	—	February 21, 2012	Mount Lemmon	Mount Lemmon Survey	·	940 m	MPC · JPL
857100	2012 DY_{33}	—	January 21, 2012	Kitt Peak	Spacewatch	·	1.0 km	MPC · JPL

== 857101–857200 ==
back to top

Designation			Discovery			Properties		Ref
Permanent	Provisional	Named after	Date	Site	Discoverer(s)	Category	Diam.	Ref
857101	2012 DE_{42}	—	February 19, 2012	Kitt Peak	Spacewatch	·	950 m	MPC · JPL
857102	2012 DL_{42}	—	February 13, 2002	Sacramento Peak	SDSS	·	480 m	MPC · JPL
857103	2012 DJ_{43}	—	February 26, 2012	Mount Lemmon	Mount Lemmon Survey	·	2.2 km	MPC · JPL
857104	2012 DU_{49}	—	February 26, 2012	Kitt Peak	Spacewatch	DOR	1.4 km	MPC · JPL
857105	2012 DD_{52}	—	February 27, 2012	Kitt Peak	Spacewatch	·	970 m	MPC · JPL
857106	2012 DM_{52}	—	February 1, 2012	Kitt Peak	Spacewatch	·	1.0 km	MPC · JPL
857107	2012 DD_{55}	—	February 24, 2012	Kitt Peak	Spacewatch	·	1.5 km	MPC · JPL
857108	2012 DN_{56}	—	February 13, 2012	Kitt Peak	Spacewatch	·	1.7 km	MPC · JPL
857109	2012 DV_{56}	—	January 19, 2012	Mount Lemmon	Mount Lemmon Survey	·	1.6 km	MPC · JPL
857110	2012 DM_{59}	—	February 26, 2012	Haleakala	Pan-STARRS 1	·	2.0 km	MPC · JPL
857111	2012 DR_{64}	—	February 13, 2012	Haleakala	Pan-STARRS 1	·	990 m	MPC · JPL
857112	2012 DG_{65}	—	January 30, 2012	Kitt Peak	Spacewatch	·	1.5 km	MPC · JPL
857113	2012 DR_{65}	—	December 31, 2007	Kitt Peak	Spacewatch	NYS	770 m	MPC · JPL
857114	2012 DQ_{71}	—	January 19, 2012	Haleakala	Pan-STARRS 1	EOS	1.4 km	MPC · JPL
857115	2012 DV_{71}	—	October 9, 2007	Mount Lemmon	Mount Lemmon Survey	·	590 m	MPC · JPL
857116	2012 DK_{72}	—	February 25, 2012	Mount Lemmon	Mount Lemmon Survey	·	1.8 km	MPC · JPL
857117	2012 DG_{73}	—	December 26, 2011	Mount Lemmon	Mount Lemmon Survey	·	2.8 km	MPC · JPL
857118	2012 DG_{76}	—	February 25, 2012	Kitt Peak	Spacewatch	·	2.9 km	MPC · JPL
857119	2012 DS_{76}	—	February 21, 2012	Mount Lemmon	Mount Lemmon Survey	·	1.6 km	MPC · JPL
857120	2012 DJ_{81}	—	February 21, 2012	Kitt Peak	Spacewatch	·	1.4 km	MPC · JPL
857121	2012 DR_{90}	—	February 1, 2012	Kitt Peak	Spacewatch	3:2 · SHU	4.2 km	MPC · JPL
857122	2012 DK_{91}	—	February 14, 2012	Mayhill-ISON	L. Elenin	·	1.0 km	MPC · JPL
857123	2012 DM_{91}	—	February 16, 2012	Haleakala	Pan-STARRS 1	·	2.3 km	MPC · JPL
857124	2012 DO_{91}	—	February 16, 2012	Haleakala	Pan-STARRS 1	KON	1.5 km	MPC · JPL
857125	2012 DD_{94}	—	February 3, 2012	Haleakala	Pan-STARRS 1	·	720 m	MPC · JPL
857126	2012 DJ_{95}	—	February 16, 2012	Haleakala	Pan-STARRS 1	·	1.8 km	MPC · JPL
857127	2012 DJ_{99}	—	February 26, 2012	Mount Lemmon	Mount Lemmon Survey	H	420 m	MPC · JPL
857128	2012 DX_{99}	—	February 25, 2012	Kitt Peak	Spacewatch	·	1.7 km	MPC · JPL
857129	2012 DL_{100}	—	April 23, 2007	Mount Lemmon	Mount Lemmon Survey	·	2.0 km	MPC · JPL
857130	2012 DM_{100}	—	February 27, 2012	Haleakala	Pan-STARRS 1	TIR	1.9 km	MPC · JPL
857131	2012 DX_{103}	—	February 27, 2012	Haleakala	Pan-STARRS 1	·	940 m	MPC · JPL
857132	2012 DG_{104}	—	February 27, 2012	Haleakala	Pan-STARRS 1	·	1.9 km	MPC · JPL
857133	2012 DE_{105}	—	February 28, 2012	Haleakala	Pan-STARRS 1	·	1.3 km	MPC · JPL
857134	2012 DK_{106}	—	February 16, 2012	Haleakala	Pan-STARRS 1	·	450 m	MPC · JPL
857135	2012 DZ_{106}	—	February 28, 2012	Haleakala	Pan-STARRS 1	·	890 m	MPC · JPL
857136	2012 DZ_{107}	—	February 16, 2012	Haleakala	Pan-STARRS 1	MAS	610 m	MPC · JPL
857137	2012 DA_{108}	—	February 25, 2012	Mount Lemmon	Mount Lemmon Survey	EOS	1.2 km	MPC · JPL
857138	2012 DM_{108}	—	February 27, 2012	Haleakala	Pan-STARRS 1	·	1.2 km	MPC · JPL
857139	2012 DO_{108}	—	September 12, 2015	Haleakala	Pan-STARRS 1	EOS	1.2 km	MPC · JPL
857140	2012 DJ_{109}	—	February 26, 2012	Mount Lemmon	Mount Lemmon Survey	·	2.4 km	MPC · JPL
857141	2012 DX_{109}	—	February 28, 2012	Haleakala	Pan-STARRS 1	·	1.8 km	MPC · JPL
857142	2012 DC_{110}	—	February 27, 2012	Haleakala	Pan-STARRS 1	·	2.2 km	MPC · JPL
857143	2012 DJ_{112}	—	February 24, 2012	Kitt Peak	Spacewatch	·	2.0 km	MPC · JPL
857144	2012 DB_{114}	—	February 28, 2012	Haleakala	Pan-STARRS 1	(2076)	460 m	MPC · JPL
857145	2012 DH_{114}	—	March 17, 2018	Mount Lemmon	Mount Lemmon Survey	TIR	2.0 km	MPC · JPL
857146	2012 DJ_{114}	—	February 29, 2012	Kitt Peak	Spacewatch	3:2 · SHU	3.9 km	MPC · JPL
857147	2012 DQ_{114}	—	June 7, 2013	Haleakala	Pan-STARRS 1	·	1.6 km	MPC · JPL
857148	2012 DX_{115}	—	February 28, 2012	Haleakala	Pan-STARRS 1	·	1.2 km	MPC · JPL
857149	2012 DR_{117}	—	February 25, 2012	Kitt Peak	Spacewatch	·	670 m	MPC · JPL
857150	2012 DZ_{117}	—	February 25, 2012	Kitt Peak	Spacewatch	NYS	840 m	MPC · JPL
857151	2012 DK_{118}	—	February 28, 2012	Haleakala	Pan-STARRS 1	3:2	3.5 km	MPC · JPL
857152	2012 DR_{118}	—	February 27, 2012	Haleakala	Pan-STARRS 1	V	480 m	MPC · JPL
857153	2012 DV_{119}	—	February 27, 2012	Haleakala	Pan-STARRS 1	·	2.5 km	MPC · JPL
857154	2012 DH_{120}	—	February 16, 2012	Haleakala	Pan-STARRS 1	·	790 m	MPC · JPL
857155	2012 DJ_{121}	—	February 28, 2012	Haleakala	Pan-STARRS 1	EOS	1.4 km	MPC · JPL
857156	2012 DL_{121}	—	February 28, 2012	Haleakala	Pan-STARRS 1	EOS	1.4 km	MPC · JPL
857157	2012 DD_{123}	—	February 21, 2012	Kitt Peak	Spacewatch	·	1.4 km	MPC · JPL
857158	2012 DK_{125}	—	February 23, 2012	Mount Lemmon	Mount Lemmon Survey	MAS	470 m	MPC · JPL
857159	2012 DY_{125}	—	February 20, 2012	Kitt Peak	Spacewatch	H	410 m	MPC · JPL
857160	2012 DA_{126}	—	February 28, 2012	Haleakala	Pan-STARRS 1	·	1.1 km	MPC · JPL
857161	2012 DL_{126}	—	February 28, 2012	Haleakala	Pan-STARRS 1	·	2.5 km	MPC · JPL
857162	2012 DU_{126}	—	February 24, 2012	Mount Lemmon	Mount Lemmon Survey	PHO	590 m	MPC · JPL
857163	2012 DW_{126}	—	February 24, 2012	Mount Lemmon	Mount Lemmon Survey	·	2.1 km	MPC · JPL
857164	2012 DF_{127}	—	February 21, 2012	Kitt Peak	Spacewatch	·	2.2 km	MPC · JPL
857165	2012 DF_{128}	—	February 16, 2012	Haleakala	Pan-STARRS 1	·	2.6 km	MPC · JPL
857166	2012 DL_{128}	—	February 16, 2012	Haleakala	Pan-STARRS 1	·	1.2 km	MPC · JPL
857167	2012 DX_{128}	—	February 27, 2012	Haleakala	Pan-STARRS 1	·	700 m	MPC · JPL
857168	2012 DT_{131}	—	February 20, 2012	Haleakala	Pan-STARRS 1	·	2.2 km	MPC · JPL
857169	2012 DX_{131}	—	February 27, 2012	Haleakala	Pan-STARRS 1	·	1.8 km	MPC · JPL
857170	2012 DQ_{132}	—	February 28, 2012	Haleakala	Pan-STARRS 1	·	720 m	MPC · JPL
857171	2012 DH_{133}	—	February 28, 2012	Haleakala	Pan-STARRS 1	AGN	890 m	MPC · JPL
857172	2012 EF_{4}	—	February 22, 2012	Kitt Peak	Spacewatch	·	2.3 km	MPC · JPL
857173	2012 ER_{13}	—	March 15, 2012	Mount Lemmon	Mount Lemmon Survey	·	1.4 km	MPC · JPL
857174	2012 EA_{16}	—	January 27, 2012	Kitt Peak	Spacewatch	·	560 m	MPC · JPL
857175	2012 EK_{16}	—	March 16, 2012	Haleakala	Pan-STARRS 1	·	2.5 km	MPC · JPL
857176	2012 EE_{18}	—	March 14, 2012	Haleakala	Pan-STARRS 1	SDO	206 km	MPC · JPL
857177	2012 EC_{20}	—	March 2, 2012	Mount Lemmon	Mount Lemmon Survey	H	330 m	MPC · JPL
857178	2012 EM_{20}	—	March 15, 2012	Mount Lemmon	Mount Lemmon Survey	·	500 m	MPC · JPL
857179	2012 EQ_{20}	—	March 14, 2012	Kitt Peak	Spacewatch	·	770 m	MPC · JPL
857180	2012 EV_{20}	—	March 15, 2012	Mount Lemmon	Mount Lemmon Survey	·	440 m	MPC · JPL
857181	2012 EP_{21}	—	March 15, 2012	Mount Lemmon	Mount Lemmon Survey	·	2.3 km	MPC · JPL
857182	2012 ES_{21}	—	March 15, 2012	Mount Lemmon	Mount Lemmon Survey	URS	2.4 km	MPC · JPL
857183	2012 EZ_{21}	—	March 14, 2012	Haleakala	Pan-STARRS 1	H	470 m	MPC · JPL
857184	2012 EN_{22}	—	March 15, 2012	Kitt Peak	Spacewatch	NYS	770 m	MPC · JPL
857185	2012 EX_{22}	—	March 15, 2012	Mount Lemmon	Mount Lemmon Survey	·	1.6 km	MPC · JPL
857186	2012 EZ_{22}	—	August 13, 2017	Haleakala	Pan-STARRS 1	PHO	640 m	MPC · JPL
857187	2012 EJ_{23}	—	March 15, 2012	Mount Lemmon	Mount Lemmon Survey	PHO	690 m	MPC · JPL
857188	2012 ES_{23}	—	March 1, 2012	Mount Lemmon	Mount Lemmon Survey	·	670 m	MPC · JPL
857189	2012 EH_{24}	—	March 15, 2012	Mount Lemmon	Mount Lemmon Survey	(895)	2.4 km	MPC · JPL
857190	2012 EJ_{24}	—	March 15, 2012	Mount Lemmon	Mount Lemmon Survey	·	510 m	MPC · JPL
857191	2012 EE_{26}	—	March 14, 2012	Mount Lemmon	Mount Lemmon Survey	3:2 · SHU	4.2 km	MPC · JPL
857192	2012 EK_{27}	—	March 4, 2012	Mount Lemmon	Mount Lemmon Survey	·	1.6 km	MPC · JPL
857193	2012 EH_{28}	—	March 14, 2012	Mount Lemmon	Mount Lemmon Survey	·	1.8 km	MPC · JPL
857194	2012 EU_{28}	—	August 9, 2005	Cerro Tololo	Deep Ecliptic Survey	·	1.3 km	MPC · JPL
857195	2012 EV_{28}	—	March 13, 2012	Mount Lemmon	Mount Lemmon Survey	·	2.0 km	MPC · JPL
857196	2012 EJ_{29}	—	March 1, 2012	Mount Lemmon	Mount Lemmon Survey	MRX	720 m	MPC · JPL
857197	2012 EV_{31}	—	March 13, 2012	Mount Lemmon	Mount Lemmon Survey	·	1.3 km	MPC · JPL
857198	2012 EW_{34}	—	March 13, 2012	Mount Lemmon	Mount Lemmon Survey	PHO	630 m	MPC · JPL
857199	2012 FJ_{3}	—	March 16, 2012	Haleakala	Pan-STARRS 1	ERI	950 m	MPC · JPL
857200	2012 FL_{5}	—	March 16, 2012	Haleakala	Pan-STARRS 1	KRM	1.3 km	MPC · JPL

== 857201–857300 ==
back to top

Designation			Discovery			Properties		Ref
Permanent	Provisional	Named after	Date	Site	Discoverer(s)	Category	Diam.	Ref
857201	2012 FO_{5}	—	November 9, 2004	Mauna Kea	Veillet, C.	THM	1.6 km	MPC · JPL
857202	2012 FG_{7}	—	February 23, 2012	Mount Lemmon	Mount Lemmon Survey	·	420 m	MPC · JPL
857203	2012 FM_{7}	—	January 19, 2008	Mount Lemmon	Mount Lemmon Survey	·	990 m	MPC · JPL
857204	2012 FQ_{8}	—	February 16, 2012	Haleakala	Pan-STARRS 1	·	1.8 km	MPC · JPL
857205	2012 FX_{9}	—	March 16, 2012	Haleakala	Pan-STARRS 1	NYS	790 m	MPC · JPL
857206	2012 FK_{12}	—	March 17, 2012	Mount Lemmon	Mount Lemmon Survey	·	2.1 km	MPC · JPL
857207	2012 FR_{12}	—	March 16, 2012	Kitt Peak	Spacewatch	·	1.1 km	MPC · JPL
857208	2012 FL_{13}	—	March 17, 2012	Mount Lemmon	Mount Lemmon Survey	·	1.6 km	MPC · JPL
857209	2012 FE_{15}	—	June 1, 2009	Catalina	CSS	·	640 m	MPC · JPL
857210	2012 FY_{15}	—	March 17, 2012	Mount Lemmon	Mount Lemmon Survey	·	1 km	MPC · JPL
857211	2012 FT_{17}	—	September 18, 2010	Mount Lemmon	Mount Lemmon Survey	·	1 km	MPC · JPL
857212	2012 FS_{19}	—	January 13, 2008	Kitt Peak	Spacewatch	·	740 m	MPC · JPL
857213	2012 FC_{20}	—	March 17, 2012	Mount Lemmon	Mount Lemmon Survey	EOS	1.3 km	MPC · JPL
857214	2012 FM_{20}	—	March 16, 2012	Kitt Peak	Spacewatch	MAS	490 m	MPC · JPL
857215	2012 FE_{24}	—	March 17, 2012	Kitt Peak	Spacewatch	·	770 m	MPC · JPL
857216	2012 FV_{26}	—	February 28, 2012	Haleakala	Pan-STARRS 1	·	1.2 km	MPC · JPL
857217	2012 FX_{29}	—	March 23, 2012	Mount Lemmon	Mount Lemmon Survey	T_{j} (2.98) · EUP	3.2 km	MPC · JPL
857218	2012 FE_{34}	—	February 28, 2012	Haleakala	Pan-STARRS 1	·	1.7 km	MPC · JPL
857219	2012 FM_{37}	—	March 25, 2012	Mount Lemmon	Mount Lemmon Survey	·	840 m	MPC · JPL
857220	2012 FG_{41}	—	March 17, 2012	Mount Lemmon	Mount Lemmon Survey	·	2.0 km	MPC · JPL
857221	2012 FL_{45}	—	April 24, 2007	Kitt Peak	Spacewatch	·	1.5 km	MPC · JPL
857222	2012 FQ_{46}	—	February 25, 2012	Kitt Peak	Spacewatch	·	1.1 km	MPC · JPL
857223	2012 FN_{53}	—	November 12, 2010	Mount Lemmon	Mount Lemmon Survey	·	2.9 km	MPC · JPL
857224	2012 FY_{56}	—	March 17, 2012	Mount Lemmon	Mount Lemmon Survey	·	2.3 km	MPC · JPL
857225	2012 FB_{63}	—	October 10, 2015	Haleakala	Pan-STARRS 1	HYG	1.9 km	MPC · JPL
857226	2012 FD_{63}	—	March 25, 2012	Mount Lemmon	Mount Lemmon Survey	·	2.4 km	MPC · JPL
857227	2012 FH_{64}	—	February 28, 2012	Haleakala	Pan-STARRS 1	EOS	1.3 km	MPC · JPL
857228	2012 FJ_{66}	—	March 16, 2012	Mount Lemmon	Mount Lemmon Survey	·	1.4 km	MPC · JPL
857229	2012 FF_{67}	—	February 28, 2012	Haleakala	Pan-STARRS 1	·	2.2 km	MPC · JPL
857230	2012 FH_{69}	—	March 14, 2012	Mount Lemmon	Mount Lemmon Survey	·	740 m	MPC · JPL
857231	2012 FR_{69}	—	November 1, 2010	Mount Lemmon	Mount Lemmon Survey	(5)	810 m	MPC · JPL
857232	2012 FN_{70}	—	February 3, 2006	Mount Lemmon	Mount Lemmon Survey	·	2.1 km	MPC · JPL
857233	2012 FL_{74}	—	February 29, 2012	Mount Lemmon	Mount Lemmon Survey	H	270 m	MPC · JPL
857234	2012 FB_{76}	—	December 25, 2011	Mount Lemmon	Mount Lemmon Survey	·	1.5 km	MPC · JPL
857235	2012 FX_{78}	—	March 17, 2012	Catalina	CSS	·	2.4 km	MPC · JPL
857236	2012 FQ_{80}	—	February 7, 2006	Kitt Peak	Spacewatch	T_{j} (2.98)	2.8 km	MPC · JPL
857237	2012 FS_{80}	—	March 20, 2012	Piszkés-tető	K. Sárneczky, K. Takáts	H	380 m	MPC · JPL
857238	2012 FL_{81}	—	March 31, 2012	Mount Lemmon	Mount Lemmon Survey	·	2.5 km	MPC · JPL
857239	2012 FW_{84}	—	November 8, 2010	Mount Lemmon	Mount Lemmon Survey	H	350 m	MPC · JPL
857240	2012 FE_{88}	—	March 23, 2012	Mount Lemmon	Mount Lemmon Survey	PHO	600 m	MPC · JPL
857241	2012 FL_{88}	—	March 16, 2012	Haleakala	Pan-STARRS 1	·	2.0 km	MPC · JPL
857242	2012 FE_{89}	—	March 29, 2012	Haleakala	Pan-STARRS 1	·	670 m	MPC · JPL
857243	2012 FZ_{89}	—	March 29, 2012	Mount Lemmon	Mount Lemmon Survey	·	2.1 km	MPC · JPL
857244	2012 FG_{91}	—	March 23, 2012	Catalina	CSS	·	1.5 km	MPC · JPL
857245	2012 FJ_{91}	—	March 28, 2012	Kitt Peak	Spacewatch	·	1.5 km	MPC · JPL
857246	2012 FG_{92}	—	March 27, 2012	Mount Lemmon	Mount Lemmon Survey	·	2.3 km	MPC · JPL
857247	2012 FH_{92}	—	March 23, 2012	Kitt Peak	Spacewatch	·	2.7 km	MPC · JPL
857248	2012 FY_{93}	—	October 25, 2014	Haleakala	Pan-STARRS 1	MAS	510 m	MPC · JPL
857249	2012 FN_{94}	—	August 31, 2014	Haleakala	Pan-STARRS 1	HOF	1.7 km	MPC · JPL
857250	2012 FR_{95}	—	March 29, 2012	Haleakala	Pan-STARRS 1	·	540 m	MPC · JPL
857251	2012 FD_{96}	—	March 28, 2012	Mount Lemmon	Mount Lemmon Survey	·	390 m	MPC · JPL
857252	2012 FY_{96}	—	March 17, 2012	Mount Lemmon	Mount Lemmon Survey	EOS	1.2 km	MPC · JPL
857253	2012 FJ_{97}	—	March 29, 2012	Haleakala	Pan-STARRS 1	·	2.5 km	MPC · JPL
857254	2012 FP_{98}	—	March 27, 2012	Kitt Peak	Spacewatch	·	800 m	MPC · JPL
857255	2012 FY_{98}	—	March 22, 2012	Mount Lemmon	Mount Lemmon Survey	EOS	1.1 km	MPC · JPL
857256	2012 FK_{101}	—	March 16, 2012	Mount Lemmon	Mount Lemmon Survey	·	2.0 km	MPC · JPL
857257	2012 FA_{102}	—	March 28, 2012	Mount Lemmon	Mount Lemmon Survey	·	2.0 km	MPC · JPL
857258	2012 FA_{103}	—	March 31, 2012	Mount Lemmon	Mount Lemmon Survey	·	710 m	MPC · JPL
857259	2012 FJ_{103}	—	March 16, 2012	Mount Lemmon	Mount Lemmon Survey	·	700 m	MPC · JPL
857260	2012 FR_{103}	—	March 28, 2012	Mount Lemmon	Mount Lemmon Survey	·	470 m	MPC · JPL
857261	2012 FP_{104}	—	March 28, 2012	Kitt Peak	Spacewatch	·	2.3 km	MPC · JPL
857262	2012 FQ_{104}	—	March 31, 2012	Kitt Peak	Spacewatch	VER	1.8 km	MPC · JPL
857263	2012 FS_{104}	—	March 29, 2012	Kitt Peak	Spacewatch	·	2.3 km	MPC · JPL
857264	2012 FN_{109}	—	March 17, 2012	Mount Lemmon	Mount Lemmon Survey	HYG	2.0 km	MPC · JPL
857265	2012 FQ_{109}	—	March 16, 2012	Mount Lemmon	Mount Lemmon Survey	·	530 m	MPC · JPL
857266	2012 FR_{109}	—	March 25, 2012	Mount Lemmon	Mount Lemmon Survey	TIR	2.0 km	MPC · JPL
857267	2012 FK_{111}	—	March 17, 2012	Mount Lemmon	Mount Lemmon Survey	H	390 m	MPC · JPL
857268	2012 FP_{114}	—	March 24, 2012	Mount Lemmon	Mount Lemmon Survey	·	3.1 km	MPC · JPL
857269	2012 FB_{119}	—	March 22, 2012	Mount Lemmon	Mount Lemmon Survey	·	2.2 km	MPC · JPL
857270	2012 FF_{119}	—	March 27, 2012	Mount Lemmon	Mount Lemmon Survey	·	2.3 km	MPC · JPL
857271	2012 FT_{120}	—	March 20, 2012	Haleakala	Pan-STARRS 1	·	1.9 km	MPC · JPL
857272	2012 FU_{120}	—	March 24, 2012	Mount Lemmon	Mount Lemmon Survey	·	2.2 km	MPC · JPL
857273	2012 GE_{4}	—	April 11, 2012	Mount Lemmon	Mount Lemmon Survey	·	1.2 km	MPC · JPL
857274	2012 GK_{5}	—	April 21, 2009	Mount Lemmon	Mount Lemmon Survey	·	670 m	MPC · JPL
857275	2012 GV_{6}	—	March 31, 2012	Mount Lemmon	Mount Lemmon Survey	H	470 m	MPC · JPL
857276	2012 GJ_{8}	—	March 29, 2012	Mount Lemmon	Mount Lemmon Survey	·	1.7 km	MPC · JPL
857277	2012 GZ_{13}	—	October 3, 2008	Mount Lemmon	Mount Lemmon Survey	TIR	2.4 km	MPC · JPL
857278	2012 GC_{15}	—	April 13, 2012	Haleakala	Pan-STARRS 1	·	1.9 km	MPC · JPL
857279	2012 GL_{15}	—	April 13, 2012	Haleakala	Pan-STARRS 1	H	340 m	MPC · JPL
857280	2012 GA_{16}	—	February 25, 2006	Mount Lemmon	Mount Lemmon Survey	THB	2.0 km	MPC · JPL
857281	2012 GF_{17}	—	April 15, 2012	Haleakala	Pan-STARRS 1	LIX	2.4 km	MPC · JPL
857282	2012 GW_{17}	—	April 14, 2012	Haleakala	Pan-STARRS 1	H	390 m	MPC · JPL
857283	2012 GK_{18}	—	February 26, 2012	Mount Lemmon	Mount Lemmon Survey	·	1.5 km	MPC · JPL
857284	2012 GM_{20}	—	April 14, 2012	Haleakala	Pan-STARRS 1	·	1.5 km	MPC · JPL
857285	2012 GV_{27}	—	March 30, 2012	Mount Lemmon	Mount Lemmon Survey	TIR	2.3 km	MPC · JPL
857286	2012 GE_{29}	—	February 25, 2012	Mount Lemmon	Mount Lemmon Survey	·	2.2 km	MPC · JPL
857287	2012 GQ_{32}	—	February 25, 2012	Mount Lemmon	Mount Lemmon Survey	·	470 m	MPC · JPL
857288	2012 GE_{36}	—	April 15, 2012	Haleakala	Pan-STARRS 1	·	480 m	MPC · JPL
857289	2012 GW_{44}	—	December 21, 2014	Haleakala	Pan-STARRS 1	·	510 m	MPC · JPL
857290	2012 GH_{45}	—	April 1, 2012	Mount Lemmon	Mount Lemmon Survey	·	510 m	MPC · JPL
857291	2012 GP_{45}	—	May 19, 2018	Haleakala	Pan-STARRS 1	EOS	1.4 km	MPC · JPL
857292	2012 GS_{45}	—	August 3, 2016	Haleakala	Pan-STARRS 1	·	590 m	MPC · JPL
857293	2012 GN_{47}	—	May 21, 2018	Haleakala	Pan-STARRS 1	·	1.8 km	MPC · JPL
857294	2012 GX_{47}	—	January 4, 2016	Haleakala	Pan-STARRS 1	·	1.4 km	MPC · JPL
857295	2012 GJ_{48}	—	April 15, 2012	Haleakala	Pan-STARRS 1	·	470 m	MPC · JPL
857296	2012 GK_{48}	—	April 15, 2012	Haleakala	Pan-STARRS 1	·	810 m	MPC · JPL
857297	2012 GD_{50}	—	April 15, 2012	Haleakala	Pan-STARRS 1	·	1.8 km	MPC · JPL
857298	2012 GG_{50}	—	April 15, 2012	Haleakala	Pan-STARRS 1	·	450 m	MPC · JPL
857299	2012 GB_{52}	—	April 15, 2012	Haleakala	Pan-STARRS 1	·	810 m	MPC · JPL
857300	2012 GN_{53}	—	April 1, 2012	Mount Lemmon	Mount Lemmon Survey	·	2.0 km	MPC · JPL

== 857301–857400 ==
back to top

Designation			Discovery			Properties		Ref
Permanent	Provisional	Named after	Date	Site	Discoverer(s)	Category	Diam.	Ref
857301	2012 GB_{54}	—	April 11, 2012	Mount Lemmon	Mount Lemmon Survey	V	420 m	MPC · JPL
857302	2012 HF_{12}	—	May 12, 2007	Mount Lemmon	Mount Lemmon Survey	AEG	2.2 km	MPC · JPL
857303	2012 HY_{16}	—	April 15, 2012	Haleakala	Pan-STARRS 1	H	500 m	MPC · JPL
857304	2012 HA_{23}	—	April 14, 2008	Mount Lemmon	Mount Lemmon Survey	·	820 m	MPC · JPL
857305	2012 HO_{24}	—	April 26, 2012	Haleakala	Pan-STARRS 1	H	360 m	MPC · JPL
857306	2012 HS_{29}	—	April 27, 2012	Haleakala	Pan-STARRS 1	·	2.0 km	MPC · JPL
857307	2012 HX_{29}	—	April 1, 2012	Kitt Peak	Spacewatch	·	2.2 km	MPC · JPL
857308	2012 HH_{33}	—	April 15, 2012	Haleakala	Pan-STARRS 1	·	540 m	MPC · JPL
857309	2012 HP_{33}	—	April 28, 2012	Mount Lemmon	Mount Lemmon Survey	·	1.1 km	MPC · JPL
857310	2012 HV_{36}	—	March 27, 2012	Kitt Peak	Spacewatch	·	2.6 km	MPC · JPL
857311	2012 HX_{40}	—	February 26, 2008	Mount Lemmon	Mount Lemmon Survey	·	960 m	MPC · JPL
857312	2012 HP_{43}	—	March 28, 2012	Mount Lemmon	Mount Lemmon Survey	VER	2.4 km	MPC · JPL
857313	2012 HU_{43}	—	September 24, 2008	Mount Lemmon	Mount Lemmon Survey	·	2.6 km	MPC · JPL
857314	2012 HD_{44}	—	April 19, 2012	Mount Lemmon	Mount Lemmon Survey	·	410 m	MPC · JPL
857315	2012 HE_{49}	—	April 22, 2012	Kitt Peak	Spacewatch	·	2.7 km	MPC · JPL
857316	2012 HN_{49}	—	April 15, 2012	Haleakala	Pan-STARRS 1	LIX	2.4 km	MPC · JPL
857317	2012 HU_{52}	—	March 28, 2012	Mount Lemmon	Mount Lemmon Survey	PHO	570 m	MPC · JPL
857318	2012 HU_{60}	—	April 19, 2012	Mount Lemmon	Mount Lemmon Survey	(883)	410 m	MPC · JPL
857319	2012 HS_{63}	—	April 1, 2012	Mount Lemmon	Mount Lemmon Survey	·	620 m	MPC · JPL
857320	2012 HC_{66}	—	April 1, 2012	Haleakala	Pan-STARRS 1	·	1.6 km	MPC · JPL
857321	2012 HE_{67}	—	April 21, 2012	Kitt Peak	Spacewatch	H	420 m	MPC · JPL
857322	2012 HT_{68}	—	April 15, 2012	Haleakala	Pan-STARRS 1	·	2.2 km	MPC · JPL
857323	2012 HB_{70}	—	April 22, 2012	Kitt Peak	Spacewatch	·	1.5 km	MPC · JPL
857324	2012 HZ_{71}	—	March 29, 2012	Mount Lemmon	Mount Lemmon Survey	·	2.5 km	MPC · JPL
857325	2012 HA_{72}	—	April 16, 2012	Kitt Peak	Spacewatch	·	1.8 km	MPC · JPL
857326	2012 HR_{74}	—	April 27, 2012	Haleakala	Pan-STARRS 1	·	1.1 km	MPC · JPL
857327	2012 HX_{74}	—	April 27, 2012	Haleakala	Pan-STARRS 1	·	600 m	MPC · JPL
857328	2012 HX_{75}	—	April 13, 2012	Kitt Peak	Spacewatch	·	480 m	MPC · JPL
857329	2012 HJ_{77}	—	April 24, 2012	Kitt Peak	Spacewatch	·	630 m	MPC · JPL
857330	2012 HA_{81}	—	April 29, 2012	Kitt Peak	Spacewatch	·	2.2 km	MPC · JPL
857331	2012 HM_{83}	—	April 30, 2012	Mount Lemmon	Mount Lemmon Survey	·	2.6 km	MPC · JPL
857332	2012 HE_{86}	—	April 19, 2012	Mount Lemmon	Mount Lemmon Survey	·	2.0 km	MPC · JPL
857333	2012 HG_{89}	—	April 28, 2012	Mount Lemmon	Mount Lemmon Survey	·	880 m	MPC · JPL
857334	2012 HK_{89}	—	September 23, 2015	Haleakala	Pan-STARRS 1	·	2.0 km	MPC · JPL
857335	2012 HV_{89}	—	April 20, 2012	Kitt Peak	Spacewatch	·	1.6 km	MPC · JPL
857336	2012 HX_{89}	—	November 13, 2015	Mount Lemmon	Mount Lemmon Survey	·	2.4 km	MPC · JPL
857337	2012 HV_{90}	—	April 27, 2012	Haleakala	Pan-STARRS 1	·	2.4 km	MPC · JPL
857338	2012 HY_{90}	—	April 19, 2012	Mount Lemmon	Mount Lemmon Survey	EOS	1.3 km	MPC · JPL
857339	2012 HE_{91}	—	December 29, 2014	Haleakala	Pan-STARRS 1	·	920 m	MPC · JPL
857340	2012 HN_{93}	—	July 10, 2007	Siding Spring	SSS	·	2.4 km	MPC · JPL
857341	2012 HT_{93}	—	October 25, 2014	Kitt Peak	Spacewatch	·	2.3 km	MPC · JPL
857342	2012 HY_{93}	—	April 19, 2012	Mount Lemmon	Mount Lemmon Survey	·	2.3 km	MPC · JPL
857343	2012 HB_{94}	—	June 5, 2018	Haleakala	Pan-STARRS 1	·	2.0 km	MPC · JPL
857344	2012 HH_{94}	—	April 27, 2012	Haleakala	Pan-STARRS 1	NYS	700 m	MPC · JPL
857345	2012 HM_{94}	—	April 17, 2012	Kitt Peak	Spacewatch	·	2.2 km	MPC · JPL
857346	2012 HU_{95}	—	April 27, 2012	Haleakala	Pan-STARRS 1	V	490 m	MPC · JPL
857347	2012 HW_{95}	—	April 19, 2012	Mount Lemmon	Mount Lemmon Survey	THM	1.7 km	MPC · JPL
857348	2012 HC_{97}	—	April 27, 2012	Haleakala	Pan-STARRS 1	·	2.4 km	MPC · JPL
857349	2012 HX_{97}	—	April 19, 2012	Mount Lemmon	Mount Lemmon Survey	EOS	1.3 km	MPC · JPL
857350	2012 HL_{98}	—	April 21, 2012	Mount Lemmon	Mount Lemmon Survey	·	570 m	MPC · JPL
857351	2012 HL_{100}	—	April 27, 2012	Haleakala	Pan-STARRS 1	·	2.1 km	MPC · JPL
857352	2012 HG_{101}	—	April 20, 2012	Mount Lemmon	Mount Lemmon Survey	·	930 m	MPC · JPL
857353	2012 HQ_{102}	—	April 28, 2012	Mount Lemmon	Mount Lemmon Survey	·	910 m	MPC · JPL
857354	2012 HD_{103}	—	April 27, 2012	Haleakala	Pan-STARRS 1	·	2.3 km	MPC · JPL
857355	2012 HR_{103}	—	April 19, 2012	Mount Lemmon	Mount Lemmon Survey	·	2.2 km	MPC · JPL
857356	2012 HX_{103}	—	April 27, 2012	Haleakala	Pan-STARRS 1	·	2.2 km	MPC · JPL
857357	2012 HT_{104}	—	April 27, 2012	Haleakala	Pan-STARRS 1	·	2.2 km	MPC · JPL
857358	2012 HM_{107}	—	April 29, 2012	Kitt Peak	Spacewatch	T_{j} (2.98)	2.4 km	MPC · JPL
857359	2012 HT_{109}	—	April 27, 2012	Haleakala	Pan-STARRS 1	·	610 m	MPC · JPL
857360	2012 HB_{110}	—	April 27, 2012	Haleakala	Pan-STARRS 1	·	720 m	MPC · JPL
857361	2012 HR_{110}	—	April 27, 2012	Haleakala	Pan-STARRS 1	·	490 m	MPC · JPL
857362	2012 HS_{110}	—	April 20, 2012	Mount Lemmon	Mount Lemmon Survey	H	310 m	MPC · JPL
857363	2012 HZ_{110}	—	April 27, 2012	Mount Lemmon	Mount Lemmon Survey	·	3.0 km	MPC · JPL
857364	2012 HT_{111}	—	April 16, 2012	Haleakala	Pan-STARRS 1	HYG	2.0 km	MPC · JPL
857365	2012 HB_{113}	—	April 21, 2012	Mount Lemmon	Mount Lemmon Survey	·	2.1 km	MPC · JPL
857366	2012 HV_{114}	—	April 19, 2012	Mount Lemmon	Mount Lemmon Survey	·	2.1 km	MPC · JPL
857367	2012 HY_{114}	—	April 20, 2012	Mount Lemmon	Mount Lemmon Survey	·	2.4 km	MPC · JPL
857368	2012 HF_{115}	—	April 24, 2012	Haleakala	Pan-STARRS 1	·	2.4 km	MPC · JPL
857369	2012 HH_{115}	—	April 27, 2012	Haleakala	Pan-STARRS 1	ELF	2.5 km	MPC · JPL
857370	2012 HH_{117}	—	April 16, 2018	Haleakala	Pan-STARRS 1	·	2.2 km	MPC · JPL
857371	2012 HL_{117}	—	April 30, 2012	Mount Lemmon	Mount Lemmon Survey	·	510 m	MPC · JPL
857372	2012 JG_{3}	—	April 17, 2012	Kitt Peak	Spacewatch	·	1.6 km	MPC · JPL
857373	2012 JC_{6}	—	April 19, 2012	Kitt Peak	Spacewatch	·	770 m	MPC · JPL
857374	2012 JD_{6}	—	December 14, 2010	Mount Lemmon	Mount Lemmon Survey	T_{j} (2.98)	2.7 km	MPC · JPL
857375	2012 JU_{10}	—	April 23, 2012	Mount Lemmon	Mount Lemmon Survey	·	830 m	MPC · JPL
857376	2012 JY_{12}	—	March 29, 2012	Mount Lemmon	Mount Lemmon Survey	·	740 m	MPC · JPL
857377	2012 JM_{14}	—	May 15, 2012	Haleakala	Pan-STARRS 1	·	720 m	MPC · JPL
857378	2012 JE_{15}	—	April 30, 2012	Mount Lemmon	Mount Lemmon Survey	·	2.3 km	MPC · JPL
857379	2012 JC_{16}	—	April 30, 2012	Mount Lemmon	Mount Lemmon Survey	T_{j} (2.98) · EUP	2.4 km	MPC · JPL
857380	2012 JR_{17}	—	May 14, 2012	Catalina	CSS	AMO +1km	1.0 km	MPC · JPL
857381	2012 JW_{26}	—	May 14, 2012	Mount Lemmon	Mount Lemmon Survey	TIR	2.3 km	MPC · JPL
857382	2012 JP_{28}	—	April 20, 2012	Kitt Peak	Spacewatch	PHO	750 m	MPC · JPL
857383	2012 JV_{29}	—	May 14, 2012	Haleakala	Pan-STARRS 1	·	940 m	MPC · JPL
857384	2012 JD_{32}	—	April 23, 2012	Mount Lemmon	Mount Lemmon Survey	·	2.3 km	MPC · JPL
857385	2012 JD_{33}	—	April 2, 2006	Kitt Peak	Spacewatch	·	2.3 km	MPC · JPL
857386	2012 JJ_{35}	—	May 15, 2012	Mount Lemmon	Mount Lemmon Survey	TIR	2.1 km	MPC · JPL
857387	2012 JG_{41}	—	May 13, 2012	Kitt Peak	Spacewatch	·	3.0 km	MPC · JPL
857388	2012 JP_{49}	—	May 12, 2012	Mount Lemmon	Mount Lemmon Survey	THM	1.7 km	MPC · JPL
857389	2012 JK_{50}	—	April 15, 2012	Haleakala	Pan-STARRS 1	H	350 m	MPC · JPL
857390	2012 JV_{50}	—	April 15, 2012	Haleakala	Pan-STARRS 1	CLO	1.3 km	MPC · JPL
857391	2012 JY_{50}	—	May 13, 2012	Mount Lemmon	Mount Lemmon Survey	EUN	650 m	MPC · JPL
857392	2012 JF_{55}	—	May 12, 2012	Mount Lemmon	Mount Lemmon Survey	·	830 m	MPC · JPL
857393	2012 JJ_{56}	—	May 12, 2012	Mount Lemmon	Mount Lemmon Survey	NYS	730 m	MPC · JPL
857394	2012 JC_{61}	—	May 14, 2012	Mount Lemmon	Mount Lemmon Survey	·	770 m	MPC · JPL
857395	2012 JD_{61}	—	May 14, 2012	Mount Lemmon	Mount Lemmon Survey	·	1.8 km	MPC · JPL
857396	2012 JN_{62}	—	February 27, 2006	Mount Lemmon	Mount Lemmon Survey	·	1.8 km	MPC · JPL
857397	2012 JD_{63}	—	May 1, 2012	Mount Lemmon	Mount Lemmon Survey	·	2.4 km	MPC · JPL
857398	2012 JF_{64}	—	March 27, 2008	Mount Lemmon	Mount Lemmon Survey	·	880 m	MPC · JPL
857399	2012 JJ_{64}	—	May 15, 2012	Mount Lemmon	Mount Lemmon Survey	·	2.7 km	MPC · JPL
857400	2012 JF_{68}	—	May 15, 2012	Haleakala	Pan-STARRS 1	·	2.6 km	MPC · JPL

== 857401–857500 ==
back to top

Designation			Discovery			Properties		Ref
Permanent	Provisional	Named after	Date	Site	Discoverer(s)	Category	Diam.	Ref
857401	2012 JM_{68}	—	February 4, 2006	Kitt Peak	Spacewatch	THM	1.6 km	MPC · JPL
857402	2012 JJ_{69}	—	May 15, 2012	Haleakala	Pan-STARRS 1	·	2.1 km	MPC · JPL
857403	2012 JO_{69}	—	May 14, 2012	Kitt Peak	Spacewatch	·	460 m	MPC · JPL
857404	2012 JN_{70}	—	May 13, 2012	Mount Lemmon	Mount Lemmon Survey	·	1.0 km	MPC · JPL
857405	2012 JY_{70}	—	May 13, 2012	Mount Lemmon	Mount Lemmon Survey	·	700 m	MPC · JPL
857406	2012 JJ_{71}	—	May 1, 2012	Mount Lemmon	Mount Lemmon Survey	H	340 m	MPC · JPL
857407	2012 JN_{71}	—	May 12, 2012	Mount Lemmon	Mount Lemmon Survey	·	2.5 km	MPC · JPL
857408	2012 JP_{72}	—	May 15, 2012	Haleakala	Pan-STARRS 1	·	2.9 km	MPC · JPL
857409	2012 JR_{72}	—	May 15, 2012	Mount Lemmon	Mount Lemmon Survey	·	1.3 km	MPC · JPL
857410	2012 JS_{73}	—	May 12, 2012	Haleakala	Pan-STARRS 1	·	520 m	MPC · JPL
857411	2012 KL_{4}	—	September 17, 2010	Mount Lemmon	Mount Lemmon Survey	H	430 m	MPC · JPL
857412	2012 KN_{4}	—	May 18, 2012	Mount Lemmon	Mount Lemmon Survey	·	950 m	MPC · JPL
857413	2012 KY_{7}	—	May 19, 2012	Haleakala	Pan-STARRS 1	·	690 m	MPC · JPL
857414	2012 KH_{9}	—	December 3, 2010	Mayhill	L. Elenin	H	410 m	MPC · JPL
857415	2012 KE_{10}	—	May 16, 2012	Mount Lemmon	Mount Lemmon Survey	H	450 m	MPC · JPL
857416	2012 KY_{12}	—	May 16, 2012	Mount Lemmon	Mount Lemmon Survey	·	1.9 km	MPC · JPL
857417	2012 KA_{14}	—	March 16, 2012	Kitt Peak	Spacewatch	·	2.7 km	MPC · JPL
857418	2012 KJ_{15}	—	March 11, 2005	Kitt Peak	Deep Ecliptic Survey	·	400 m	MPC · JPL
857419	2012 KX_{16}	—	May 20, 2012	Mount Lemmon	Mount Lemmon Survey	·	2.1 km	MPC · JPL
857420	2012 KY_{16}	—	May 20, 2012	Mount Lemmon	Mount Lemmon Survey	·	460 m	MPC · JPL
857421	2012 KL_{18}	—	May 20, 2012	Siding Spring	SSS	AMO	620 m	MPC · JPL
857422	2012 KF_{21}	—	May 17, 2012	Mount Lemmon	Mount Lemmon Survey	·	1.4 km	MPC · JPL
857423	2012 KR_{21}	—	March 27, 2008	Kitt Peak	Spacewatch	·	950 m	MPC · JPL
857424	2012 KT_{26}	—	May 16, 2012	Mount Lemmon	Mount Lemmon Survey	MAS	580 m	MPC · JPL
857425	2012 KQ_{30}	—	May 19, 2012	Haleakala	Pan-STARRS 1	H	330 m	MPC · JPL
857426	2012 KT_{31}	—	March 29, 2012	Kitt Peak	Spacewatch	·	1.6 km	MPC · JPL
857427	2012 KV_{32}	—	May 16, 2012	Mount Lemmon	Mount Lemmon Survey	·	2.6 km	MPC · JPL
857428	2012 KC_{38}	—	April 27, 2012	Haleakala	Pan-STARRS 1	·	690 m	MPC · JPL
857429	2012 KB_{39}	—	April 27, 2012	Haleakala	Pan-STARRS 1	·	2.1 km	MPC · JPL
857430	2012 KA_{45}	—	January 29, 2011	Mount Lemmon	Mount Lemmon Survey	·	2.2 km	MPC · JPL
857431	2012 KR_{48}	—	May 15, 2012	Haleakala	Pan-STARRS 1	·	1.6 km	MPC · JPL
857432	2012 KS_{49}	—	May 15, 2012	Haleakala	Pan-STARRS 1	EUP	2.7 km	MPC · JPL
857433	2012 KW_{49}	—	May 21, 2012	Haleakala	Pan-STARRS 1	·	870 m	MPC · JPL
857434	2012 KV_{53}	—	February 2, 2017	Haleakala	Pan-STARRS 1	·	2.2 km	MPC · JPL
857435	2012 KL_{54}	—	May 31, 2012	Mount Lemmon	Mount Lemmon Survey	PHO	650 m	MPC · JPL
857436	2012 KS_{54}	—	May 29, 2012	Bergisch Gladbach	W. Bickel	ADE	1.5 km	MPC · JPL
857437	2012 KZ_{54}	—	May 27, 2012	Mount Lemmon	Mount Lemmon Survey	·	1.3 km	MPC · JPL
857438	2012 KZ_{55}	—	May 28, 2012	Mount Lemmon	Mount Lemmon Survey	·	550 m	MPC · JPL
857439	2012 KH_{56}	—	May 21, 2012	Haleakala	Pan-STARRS 1	H	320 m	MPC · JPL
857440	2012 KK_{56}	—	May 29, 2012	Mount Lemmon	Mount Lemmon Survey	·	1.0 km	MPC · JPL
857441	2012 KH_{57}	—	January 13, 2016	Haleakala	Pan-STARRS 1	·	1.6 km	MPC · JPL
857442	2012 KW_{57}	—	October 28, 2014	Haleakala	Pan-STARRS 1	·	2.6 km	MPC · JPL
857443	2012 KZ_{57}	—	June 6, 2018	Haleakala	Pan-STARRS 1	·	2.2 km	MPC · JPL
857444	2012 KF_{58}	—	September 12, 2016	Haleakala	Pan-STARRS 1	PHO	710 m	MPC · JPL
857445	2012 KK_{58}	—	May 27, 2012	Mount Lemmon	Mount Lemmon Survey	·	610 m	MPC · JPL
857446	2012 KZ_{58}	—	April 16, 2017	Haleakala	Pan-STARRS 1	·	2.0 km	MPC · JPL
857447	2012 KL_{59}	—	April 25, 2015	Haleakala	Pan-STARRS 1	·	660 m	MPC · JPL
857448	2012 KO_{59}	—	March 19, 2017	Haleakala	Pan-STARRS 1	·	2.1 km	MPC · JPL
857449	2012 KU_{59}	—	May 19, 2018	Haleakala	Pan-STARRS 1	VER	1.9 km	MPC · JPL
857450	2012 KY_{59}	—	May 21, 2012	Haleakala	Pan-STARRS 1	·	760 m	MPC · JPL
857451	2012 KT_{60}	—	May 21, 2012	Haleakala	Pan-STARRS 1	·	720 m	MPC · JPL
857452	2012 KW_{60}	—	May 28, 2012	Mount Lemmon	Mount Lemmon Survey	·	1.3 km	MPC · JPL
857453	2012 KE_{61}	—	May 27, 2012	Mount Lemmon	Mount Lemmon Survey	·	760 m	MPC · JPL
857454	2012 KN_{63}	—	May 27, 2012	Mount Lemmon	Mount Lemmon Survey	·	510 m	MPC · JPL
857455	2012 KB_{64}	—	May 16, 2012	Haleakala	Pan-STARRS 1	·	830 m	MPC · JPL
857456	2012 KC_{64}	—	May 16, 2012	Haleakala	Pan-STARRS 1	·	750 m	MPC · JPL
857457	2012 KP_{65}	—	May 16, 2012	Haleakala	Pan-STARRS 1	(69559)	2.5 km	MPC · JPL
857458	2012 KC_{66}	—	May 21, 2012	Haleakala	Pan-STARRS 1	·	2.0 km	MPC · JPL
857459	2012 LG_{5}	—	May 16, 2012	Haleakala	Pan-STARRS 1	PHO	1.8 km	MPC · JPL
857460	2012 LQ_{8}	—	April 4, 2005	Mount Lemmon	Mount Lemmon Survey	·	520 m	MPC · JPL
857461	2012 LR_{12}	—	June 15, 2012	Piszkéstető	K. Sárneczky	·	1.7 km	MPC · JPL
857462	2012 LS_{12}	—	June 15, 2012	Piszkéstető	K. Sárneczky	·	1.1 km	MPC · JPL
857463	2012 LA_{13}	—	June 15, 2012	Haleakala	Pan-STARRS 1	·	340 m	MPC · JPL
857464	2012 LG_{13}	—	June 12, 2012	Haleakala	Pan-STARRS 1	·	790 m	MPC · JPL
857465	2012 LM_{20}	—	June 9, 2012	Haleakala	Pan-STARRS 1	·	940 m	MPC · JPL
857466	2012 LC_{22}	—	May 15, 2012	Haleakala	Pan-STARRS 1	·	550 m	MPC · JPL
857467	2012 LT_{27}	—	December 19, 2015	Mount Lemmon	Mount Lemmon Survey	·	2.7 km	MPC · JPL
857468	2012 LL_{28}	—	April 16, 2016	Haleakala	Pan-STARRS 1	·	1.2 km	MPC · JPL
857469	2012 LO_{30}	—	June 10, 2012	Mount Lemmon	Mount Lemmon Survey	·	530 m	MPC · JPL
857470	2012 LE_{31}	—	May 16, 2012	Kitt Peak	Spacewatch	T_{j} (2.99) · (895)	3.0 km	MPC · JPL
857471	2012 LF_{31}	—	June 9, 2012	Mount Lemmon	Mount Lemmon Survey	(5)	790 m	MPC · JPL
857472	2012 LN_{31}	—	June 14, 2012	Mount Lemmon	Mount Lemmon Survey	·	830 m	MPC · JPL
857473	2012 LP_{31}	—	June 1, 2012	Mount Lemmon	Mount Lemmon Survey	H	330 m	MPC · JPL
857474	2012 LT_{32}	—	June 14, 2012	Haleakala	Pan-STARRS 1	·	1.1 km	MPC · JPL
857475	2012 LX_{32}	—	June 13, 2012	Haleakala	Pan-STARRS 1	·	2.3 km	MPC · JPL
857476	2012 LZ_{32}	—	June 13, 2012	Haleakala	Pan-STARRS 1	·	1.9 km	MPC · JPL
857477	2012 MH_{6}	—	June 20, 2012	Mount Lemmon	Mount Lemmon Survey	L5	7.4 km	MPC · JPL
857478	2012 MK_{6}	—	June 19, 2012	Siding Spring	SSS	AMO	530 m	MPC · JPL
857479	2012 MF_{12}	—	June 16, 2012	Haleakala	Pan-STARRS 1	·	1.3 km	MPC · JPL
857480	2012 MO_{13}	—	June 16, 2012	Haleakala	Pan-STARRS 1	·	1.2 km	MPC · JPL
857481	2012 MP_{16}	—	June 16, 2012	Haleakala	Pan-STARRS 1	·	2.1 km	MPC · JPL
857482	2012 MC_{17}	—	June 19, 2012	ESA OGS	ESA OGS	·	1.4 km	MPC · JPL
857483	2012 MO_{17}	—	May 14, 1994	Kitt Peak	Spacewatch	JUN	880 m	MPC · JPL
857484	2012 MU_{17}	—	June 16, 2012	Haleakala	Pan-STARRS 1	·	2.9 km	MPC · JPL
857485	2012 MB_{18}	—	June 16, 2012	Haleakala	Pan-STARRS 1	H	360 m	MPC · JPL
857486	2012 MD_{18}	—	October 12, 2016	Mount Lemmon	Mount Lemmon Survey	·	480 m	MPC · JPL
857487	2012 MU_{18}	—	June 20, 2012	Mount Lemmon	Mount Lemmon Survey	(5)	920 m	MPC · JPL
857488	2012 MJ_{19}	—	June 17, 2012	Mount Lemmon	Mount Lemmon Survey	·	1.1 km	MPC · JPL
857489	2012 MN_{19}	—	June 19, 2012	Mount Lemmon	Mount Lemmon Survey	·	1.2 km	MPC · JPL
857490	2012 MX_{19}	—	May 8, 2008	Kitt Peak	Spacewatch	·	710 m	MPC · JPL
857491	2012 NA_{1}	—	July 14, 2012	Mayhill-ISON	L. Elenin	·	420 m	MPC · JPL
857492	2012 OW_{1}	—	July 22, 2012	Westfield	R. Holmes, T. Vorobjov	BAR	1.1 km	MPC · JPL
857493	2012 OK_{4}	—	September 7, 2008	Catalina	CSS	·	1.2 km	MPC · JPL
857494	2012 OP_{4}	—	July 28, 2012	La Sagra	OAM	APO · PHA	350 m	MPC · JPL
857495	2012 OU_{6}	—	July 29, 2012	Haleakala	Pan-STARRS 1	H	390 m	MPC · JPL
857496	2012 OJ_{7}	—	July 18, 2012	Catalina	CSS	·	1.2 km	MPC · JPL
857497	2012 OK_{7}	—	July 30, 2012	Haleakala	Pan-STARRS 1	·	1.2 km	MPC · JPL
857498	2012 PK_{1}	—	August 8, 2012	Haleakala	Pan-STARRS 1	·	810 m	MPC · JPL
857499	2012 PP_{2}	—	August 8, 2012	Haleakala	Pan-STARRS 1	·	1.0 km	MPC · JPL
857500	2012 PO_{4}	—	August 8, 2012	Haleakala	Pan-STARRS 1	H	440 m	MPC · JPL

== 857501–857600 ==
back to top

Designation			Discovery			Properties		Ref
Permanent	Provisional	Named after	Date	Site	Discoverer(s)	Category	Diam.	Ref
857501	2012 PE_{6}	—	August 7, 2012	Marly	P. Kocher	·	570 m	MPC · JPL
857502	2012 PQ_{6}	—	May 23, 2012	Mount Lemmon	Mount Lemmon Survey	(194)	1.0 km	MPC · JPL
857503	2012 PQ_{7}	—	August 8, 2012	Haleakala	Pan-STARRS 1	·	1.4 km	MPC · JPL
857504	2012 PB_{10}	—	August 8, 2012	Haleakala	Pan-STARRS 1	·	1.9 km	MPC · JPL
857505	2012 PO_{12}	—	August 10, 2012	Kitt Peak	Spacewatch	·	960 m	MPC · JPL
857506	2012 PC_{14}	—	August 10, 2012	Kitt Peak	Spacewatch	·	1.2 km	MPC · JPL
857507	2012 PD_{15}	—	September 23, 2008	Kitt Peak	Spacewatch	·	1.0 km	MPC · JPL
857508	2012 PL_{16}	—	July 16, 2012	Siding Spring	SSS	(1547)	1.1 km	MPC · JPL
857509	2012 PK_{18}	—	August 10, 2012	Tincana	Zolnowski, M., Kusiak, M.	NYS	930 m	MPC · JPL
857510	2012 PR_{18}	—	October 22, 2009	Mount Lemmon	Mount Lemmon Survey	·	420 m	MPC · JPL
857511	2012 PW_{20}	—	August 12, 2012	Siding Spring	SSS	·	1.2 km	MPC · JPL
857512	2012 PB_{22}	—	May 23, 2012	Mount Lemmon	Mount Lemmon Survey	·	1.9 km	MPC · JPL
857513	2012 PL_{22}	—	October 12, 2009	Mount Lemmon	Mount Lemmon Survey	·	530 m	MPC · JPL
857514	2012 PK_{23}	—	October 3, 2008	Mount Lemmon	Mount Lemmon Survey	·	860 m	MPC · JPL
857515	2012 PA_{25}	—	August 13, 2012	Haleakala	Pan-STARRS 1	·	1.7 km	MPC · JPL
857516	2012 PC_{25}	—	August 13, 2012	Haleakala	Pan-STARRS 1	·	990 m	MPC · JPL
857517	2012 PR_{27}	—	October 2, 2008	Catalina	CSS	·	1.3 km	MPC · JPL
857518	2012 PF_{31}	—	May 28, 2012	Mount Lemmon	Mount Lemmon Survey	·	1.6 km	MPC · JPL
857519	2012 PK_{34}	—	August 8, 2012	Haleakala	Pan-STARRS 1	·	1.3 km	MPC · JPL
857520	2012 PN_{34}	—	August 8, 2012	Haleakala	Pan-STARRS 1	·	1.3 km	MPC · JPL
857521	2012 PL_{38}	—	August 6, 2012	Haleakala	Pan-STARRS 1	GEF	900 m	MPC · JPL
857522	2012 PE_{46}	—	August 13, 2012	Haleakala	Pan-STARRS 1	·	940 m	MPC · JPL
857523	2012 PD_{47}	—	August 4, 2017	Haleakala	Pan-STARRS 1	·	1.7 km	MPC · JPL
857524	2012 PC_{48}	—	August 13, 2012	Haleakala	Pan-STARRS 1	·	900 m	MPC · JPL
857525	2012 PY_{50}	—	August 6, 2012	Haleakala	Pan-STARRS 1	·	2.0 km	MPC · JPL
857526	2012 PJ_{51}	—	December 25, 2013	Haleakala	Pan-STARRS 1	LIX	2.4 km	MPC · JPL
857527	2012 PF_{52}	—	August 10, 2012	Kitt Peak	Spacewatch	·	810 m	MPC · JPL
857528	2012 PL_{54}	—	August 14, 2012	Haleakala	Pan-STARRS 1	·	1.1 km	MPC · JPL
857529	2012 PG_{55}	—	March 2, 2011	Kitt Peak	Spacewatch	·	1.9 km	MPC · JPL
857530	2012 PF_{56}	—	August 14, 2012	Haleakala	Pan-STARRS 1	·	470 m	MPC · JPL
857531	2012 PE_{58}	—	August 14, 2012	Siding Spring	SSS	·	1.2 km	MPC · JPL
857532	2012 PO_{59}	—	August 10, 2012	Kitt Peak	Spacewatch	·	990 m	MPC · JPL
857533	2012 PV_{59}	—	August 12, 2012	Siding Spring	SSS	·	990 m	MPC · JPL
857534	2012 PF_{60}	—	August 8, 2012	Haleakala	Pan-STARRS 1	MAR	690 m	MPC · JPL
857535	2012 PH_{60}	—	September 21, 2008	Kitt Peak	Spacewatch	·	1.1 km	MPC · JPL
857536	2012 PA_{61}	—	August 13, 2012	Haleakala	Pan-STARRS 1	BRA	930 m	MPC · JPL
857537	2012 PP_{61}	—	August 14, 2012	Haleakala	Pan-STARRS 1	·	530 m	MPC · JPL
857538	2012 PB_{64}	—	August 14, 2012	Haleakala	Pan-STARRS 1	·	1.9 km	MPC · JPL
857539	2012 QY	—	August 16, 2012	ESA OGS	ESA OGS	·	480 m	MPC · JPL
857540	2012 QG_{2}	—	October 10, 2008	Mount Lemmon	Mount Lemmon Survey	·	1.0 km	MPC · JPL
857541	2012 QG_{8}	—	August 17, 2012	Haleakala	Pan-STARRS 1	AMO	530 m	MPC · JPL
857542	2012 QV_{8}	—	October 19, 2007	Catalina	CSS	·	1.8 km	MPC · JPL
857543	2012 QG_{10}	—	August 15, 2012	La Sagra	OAM	·	750 m	MPC · JPL
857544	2012 QL_{11}	—	August 17, 2012	Haleakala	Pan-STARRS 1	HNS	750 m	MPC · JPL
857545	2012 QS_{12}	—	March 3, 2005	Catalina	CSS	·	1.6 km	MPC · JPL
857546	2012 QL_{13}	—	September 4, 2008	Kitt Peak	Spacewatch	(7744)	960 m	MPC · JPL
857547	2012 QQ_{14}	—	August 22, 2012	Westfield	R. Holmes, T. Vorobjov	L5 · (17492)	9.8 km	MPC · JPL
857548	2012 QX_{15}	—	November 19, 2008	Catalina	CSS	·	1.0 km	MPC · JPL
857549	2012 QQ_{16}	—	August 22, 2012	Haleakala	Pan-STARRS 1	·	1.3 km	MPC · JPL
857550	2012 QQ_{22}	—	September 29, 2003	Kitt Peak	Spacewatch	AEO	770 m	MPC · JPL
857551	2012 QJ_{28}	—	August 24, 2012	Kitt Peak	Spacewatch	AGN	900 m	MPC · JPL
857552	2012 QZ_{28}	—	September 19, 2001	Kitt Peak	Spacewatch	·	2.2 km	MPC · JPL
857553	2012 QH_{29}	—	August 11, 2012	Siding Spring	SSS	·	1.0 km	MPC · JPL
857554	2012 QK_{29}	—	August 7, 2012	Haleakala	Pan-STARRS 1	·	2.2 km	MPC · JPL
857555	2012 QR_{29}	—	August 25, 2012	Kitt Peak	Spacewatch	NYS	790 m	MPC · JPL
857556	2012 QY_{29}	—	August 25, 2012	Mount Lemmon	Mount Lemmon Survey	·	430 m	MPC · JPL
857557	2012 QG_{34}	—	September 20, 2008	Kitt Peak	Spacewatch	·	1.1 km	MPC · JPL
857558	2012 QC_{35}	—	August 25, 2012	Kitt Peak	Spacewatch	·	1.0 km	MPC · JPL
857559	2012 QG_{36}	—	November 8, 2009	Kitt Peak	Spacewatch	·	430 m	MPC · JPL
857560	2012 QF_{38}	—	August 25, 2012	Haleakala	Pan-STARRS 1	·	1.0 km	MPC · JPL
857561	2012 QJ_{39}	—	August 25, 2012	Haleakala	Pan-STARRS 1	·	1.0 km	MPC · JPL
857562	2012 QA_{40}	—	November 11, 2004	Kitt Peak	Spacewatch	·	1.2 km	MPC · JPL
857563	2012 QD_{40}	—	August 27, 2012	Haleakala	Pan-STARRS 1	·	1.3 km	MPC · JPL
857564	2012 QJ_{47}	—	August 17, 2012	Haleakala	Pan-STARRS 1	THM	1.9 km	MPC · JPL
857565	2012 QF_{48}	—	August 17, 2012	Haleakala	Pan-STARRS 1	H	310 m	MPC · JPL
857566	2012 QE_{52}	—	October 26, 2008	Mount Lemmon	Mount Lemmon Survey	·	880 m	MPC · JPL
857567	2012 QC_{55}	—	August 25, 2012	Kitt Peak	Spacewatch	·	800 m	MPC · JPL
857568	2012 QK_{55}	—	August 17, 2012	Haleakala	Pan-STARRS 1	·	900 m	MPC · JPL
857569	2012 QQ_{55}	—	August 26, 2012	Haleakala	Pan-STARRS 1	·	1.2 km	MPC · JPL
857570	2012 QQ_{57}	—	August 24, 2012	Kitt Peak	Spacewatch	·	1.1 km	MPC · JPL
857571	2012 QZ_{57}	—	October 1, 2005	Catalina	CSS	·	570 m	MPC · JPL
857572	2012 QN_{58}	—	August 25, 2012	Mount Lemmon	Mount Lemmon Survey	·	460 m	MPC · JPL
857573	2012 QV_{58}	—	August 25, 2012	Haleakala	Pan-STARRS 1	·	520 m	MPC · JPL
857574	2012 QF_{60}	—	August 26, 2012	Haleakala	Pan-STARRS 1	·	400 m	MPC · JPL
857575	2012 QJ_{60}	—	October 6, 2012	Haleakala	Pan-STARRS 1	·	740 m	MPC · JPL
857576	2012 QV_{60}	—	August 25, 2012	Haleakala	Pan-STARRS 1	·	820 m	MPC · JPL
857577	2012 QG_{61}	—	August 26, 2012	Haleakala	Pan-STARRS 1	·	2.5 km	MPC · JPL
857578	2012 QS_{61}	—	August 25, 2012	Haleakala	Pan-STARRS 1	JUN	610 m	MPC · JPL
857579	2012 QD_{62}	—	August 25, 2012	Kitt Peak	Spacewatch	·	900 m	MPC · JPL
857580	2012 QU_{62}	—	August 25, 2012	Kitt Peak	Spacewatch	PHO	710 m	MPC · JPL
857581	2012 QT_{63}	—	April 5, 2019	Haleakala	Pan-STARRS 1	HNS	660 m	MPC · JPL
857582	2012 QT_{64}	—	August 17, 2012	Haleakala	Pan-STARRS 1	·	420 m	MPC · JPL
857583	2012 QG_{65}	—	August 17, 2012	Haleakala	Pan-STARRS 1	·	990 m	MPC · JPL
857584	2012 QL_{65}	—	August 25, 2012	Kitt Peak	Spacewatch	MAR	700 m	MPC · JPL
857585	2012 QQ_{65}	—	August 26, 2012	Haleakala	Pan-STARRS 1	·	910 m	MPC · JPL
857586	2012 QS_{65}	—	August 26, 2012	Kitt Peak	Spacewatch	·	770 m	MPC · JPL
857587	2012 QR_{66}	—	November 12, 2007	Mount Lemmon	Mount Lemmon Survey	·	2.2 km	MPC · JPL
857588	2012 QQ_{68}	—	August 26, 2012	Haleakala	Pan-STARRS 1	·	990 m	MPC · JPL
857589	2012 QR_{68}	—	August 26, 2012	Haleakala	Pan-STARRS 1	BAR	860 m	MPC · JPL
857590	2012 QT_{68}	—	August 17, 2012	ESA OGS	ESA OGS	VER	2.1 km	MPC · JPL
857591	2012 QU_{68}	—	August 26, 2012	Haleakala	Pan-STARRS 1	·	760 m	MPC · JPL
857592	2012 QT_{69}	—	August 28, 2012	Mount Maidanak	A. Novichonok, O. Burhonov	·	1.3 km	MPC · JPL
857593	2012 QX_{69}	—	August 26, 2012	Haleakala	Pan-STARRS 1	·	1.7 km	MPC · JPL
857594	2012 QB_{70}	—	October 7, 2008	Mount Lemmon	Mount Lemmon Survey	·	1.2 km	MPC · JPL
857595	2012 QV_{70}	—	August 24, 2012	Kitt Peak	Spacewatch	·	2.2 km	MPC · JPL
857596	2012 QX_{70}	—	August 24, 2012	Kitt Peak	Spacewatch	·	670 m	MPC · JPL
857597	2012 QN_{72}	—	August 17, 2012	ESA OGS	ESA OGS	·	1.1 km	MPC · JPL
857598	2012 QO_{72}	—	August 25, 2012	Haleakala	Pan-STARRS 1	EUN	820 m	MPC · JPL
857599	2012 QC_{74}	—	August 26, 2012	Haleakala	Pan-STARRS 1	(5)	860 m	MPC · JPL
857600	2012 QD_{74}	—	August 26, 2012	Haleakala	Pan-STARRS 1	·	450 m	MPC · JPL

== 857601–857700 ==
back to top

Designation			Discovery			Properties		Ref
Permanent	Provisional	Named after	Date	Site	Discoverer(s)	Category	Diam.	Ref
857601	2012 QU_{74}	—	August 24, 2012	Kitt Peak	Spacewatch	(1547)	1 km	MPC · JPL
857602	2012 QV_{75}	—	August 25, 2012	Haleakala	Pan-STARRS 1	·	1.1 km	MPC · JPL
857603	2012 QW_{75}	—	August 26, 2012	Haleakala	Pan-STARRS 1	·	1.1 km	MPC · JPL
857604	2012 QC_{76}	—	August 26, 2012	Kitt Peak	Spacewatch	·	1.0 km	MPC · JPL
857605	2012 QX_{76}	—	August 23, 2012	Westfield	International Astronomical Search Collaboration	·	1.8 km	MPC · JPL
857606	2012 QW_{77}	—	August 26, 2012	Haleakala	Pan-STARRS 1	·	1.6 km	MPC · JPL
857607	2012 QO_{84}	—	August 25, 2012	Kitt Peak	Spacewatch	·	2.3 km	MPC · JPL
857608	2012 RF_{1}	—	April 2, 2011	Mount Lemmon	Mount Lemmon Survey	·	1.9 km	MPC · JPL
857609	2012 RM_{1}	—	September 29, 2008	Mount Lemmon	Mount Lemmon Survey	·	1.2 km	MPC · JPL
857610	2012 RT_{3}	—	September 8, 2012	La Sagra	OAM	·	1.0 km	MPC · JPL
857611	2012 RV_{5}	—	August 25, 2012	Mount Lemmon	Mount Lemmon Survey	·	790 m	MPC · JPL
857612	2012 RX_{5}	—	August 25, 2012	Catalina	CSS	(1547)	1.2 km	MPC · JPL
857613	2012 RC_{8}	—	September 11, 2012	La Sagra	OAM	·	880 m	MPC · JPL
857614	2012 RM_{12}	—	August 14, 2012	Haleakala	Pan-STARRS 1	JUN	800 m	MPC · JPL
857615	2012 RP_{13}	—	September 18, 2001	Anderson Mesa	LONEOS	·	900 m	MPC · JPL
857616	2012 RG_{16}	—	September 15, 2012	La Sagra	OAM	·	1.2 km	MPC · JPL
857617	2012 RW_{18}	—	September 14, 2012	Catalina	CSS	·	2.3 km	MPC · JPL
857618	2012 RT_{21}	—	March 1, 2008	Kitt Peak	Spacewatch	·	550 m	MPC · JPL
857619	2012 RF_{23}	—	September 14, 2012	Kitt Peak	Spacewatch	·	1.4 km	MPC · JPL
857620	2012 RP_{24}	—	September 15, 2012	Mount Lemmon	Mount Lemmon Survey	·	1.1 km	MPC · JPL
857621	2012 RR_{25}	—	September 21, 2009	Mount Lemmon	Mount Lemmon Survey	·	480 m	MPC · JPL
857622	2012 RU_{25}	—	February 15, 2002	Cerro Tololo	Deep Lens Survey	·	1.3 km	MPC · JPL
857623	2012 RE_{27}	—	August 26, 2012	Kitt Peak	Spacewatch	NYS	920 m	MPC · JPL
857624	2012 RA_{28}	—	August 26, 2012	Kitt Peak	Spacewatch	·	530 m	MPC · JPL
857625	2012 RG_{33}	—	February 8, 2011	Mount Lemmon	Mount Lemmon Survey	·	490 m	MPC · JPL
857626	2012 RU_{35}	—	September 15, 2012	Kitt Peak	Spacewatch	·	760 m	MPC · JPL
857627	2012 RU_{36}	—	August 26, 2012	Kitt Peak	Spacewatch	·	460 m	MPC · JPL
857628	2012 RB_{43}	—	September 22, 2012	Mount Lemmon	Mount Lemmon Survey	·	740 m	MPC · JPL
857629	2012 RZ_{44}	—	September 11, 2012	Siding Spring	SSS	JUN	770 m	MPC · JPL
857630	2012 RG_{45}	—	September 14, 2012	Catalina	CSS	NYS	970 m	MPC · JPL
857631	2012 RY_{45}	—	September 14, 2012	Mount Lemmon	Mount Lemmon Survey	·	2.5 km	MPC · JPL
857632	2012 RB_{46}	—	September 15, 2012	Catalina	CSS	·	1.2 km	MPC · JPL
857633	2012 RX_{47}	—	September 6, 2012	Mount Lemmon	Mount Lemmon Survey	(18466)	1.9 km	MPC · JPL
857634	2012 RW_{48}	—	September 14, 2012	Mount Lemmon	Mount Lemmon Survey	HNS	760 m	MPC · JPL
857635	2012 RX_{48}	—	September 6, 2012	Mount Lemmon	Mount Lemmon Survey	·	900 m	MPC · JPL
857636	2012 RT_{49}	—	March 4, 2014	Cerro Tololo	High Cadence Transient Survey	·	910 m	MPC · JPL
857637	2012 RR_{50}	—	November 22, 2014	Mount Lemmon	Mount Lemmon Survey	L5	6.5 km	MPC · JPL
857638	2012 SN_{2}	—	August 24, 2012	Kitt Peak	Spacewatch	·	580 m	MPC · JPL
857639	2012 SS_{2}	—	September 17, 2012	Kitt Peak	Spacewatch	·	640 m	MPC · JPL
857640	2012 SB_{4}	—	September 17, 2012	Kitt Peak	Spacewatch	·	1.1 km	MPC · JPL
857641	2012 SR_{5}	—	September 17, 2012	Mount Lemmon	Mount Lemmon Survey	(1547)	1.0 km	MPC · JPL
857642	2012 SH_{7}	—	September 16, 2012	Mount Lemmon	Mount Lemmon Survey	·	1.6 km	MPC · JPL
857643	2012 SP_{11}	—	December 26, 2005	Kitt Peak	Spacewatch	·	830 m	MPC · JPL
857644	2012 SK_{12}	—	September 17, 2012	Kitt Peak	Spacewatch	·	1.6 km	MPC · JPL
857645	2012 SR_{13}	—	April 27, 2011	Mount Lemmon	Mount Lemmon Survey	TIR	2.0 km	MPC · JPL
857646	2012 SZ_{13}	—	September 30, 2005	Mount Lemmon	Mount Lemmon Survey	NYS	770 m	MPC · JPL
857647	2012 SA_{14}	—	December 1, 2005	Kitt Peak	Spacewatch	·	840 m	MPC · JPL
857648	2012 SE_{14}	—	September 17, 2012	Mount Lemmon	Mount Lemmon Survey	L5	6.0 km	MPC · JPL
857649	2012 SL_{16}	—	September 17, 2012	Kitt Peak	Spacewatch	·	460 m	MPC · JPL
857650	2012 SE_{17}	—	September 17, 2012	Mount Lemmon	Mount Lemmon Survey	·	880 m	MPC · JPL
857651	2012 SR_{18}	—	October 1, 2008	Mount Lemmon	Mount Lemmon Survey	·	1.2 km	MPC · JPL
857652	2012 SA_{22}	—	September 18, 2012	Mount Lemmon	Mount Lemmon Survey	AMO +1km	820 m	MPC · JPL
857653	2012 SB_{22}	—	September 18, 2012	Catalina	CSS	AMO	480 m	MPC · JPL
857654	2012 SO_{22}	—	August 10, 2012	Kitt Peak	Spacewatch	·	940 m	MPC · JPL
857655	2012 SZ_{22}	—	September 17, 2012	Kitt Peak	Spacewatch	H	370 m	MPC · JPL
857656	2012 SX_{23}	—	September 17, 2012	Mount Lemmon	Mount Lemmon Survey	·	1.3 km	MPC · JPL
857657	2012 SE_{28}	—	September 30, 2005	Mount Lemmon	Mount Lemmon Survey	·	890 m	MPC · JPL
857658	2012 SK_{28}	—	September 18, 2012	Kitt Peak	Spacewatch	·	1.1 km	MPC · JPL
857659	2012 SO_{29}	—	August 13, 2012	Kitt Peak	Spacewatch	·	500 m	MPC · JPL
857660	2012 SX_{34}	—	March 28, 2011	Mount Lemmon	Mount Lemmon Survey	H	380 m	MPC · JPL
857661	2012 ST_{36}	—	October 4, 2008	Mount Lemmon	Mount Lemmon Survey	·	920 m	MPC · JPL
857662	2012 SL_{37}	—	August 26, 2012	Haleakala	Pan-STARRS 1	MAS	540 m	MPC · JPL
857663	2012 SA_{38}	—	October 20, 2007	Kitt Peak	Spacewatch	THM	1.5 km	MPC · JPL
857664	2012 SU_{38}	—	September 18, 2012	Mount Lemmon	Mount Lemmon Survey	PHO	600 m	MPC · JPL
857665	2012 SL_{40}	—	August 26, 2012	Haleakala	Pan-STARRS 1	·	1.8 km	MPC · JPL
857666	2012 SA_{44}	—	September 18, 2012	Mount Lemmon	Mount Lemmon Survey	·	2.1 km	MPC · JPL
857667	2012 SF_{46}	—	September 22, 2012	Kitt Peak	Spacewatch	·	650 m	MPC · JPL
857668	2012 SC_{49}	—	September 23, 2012	Mount Lemmon	Mount Lemmon Survey	·	940 m	MPC · JPL
857669	2012 SV_{50}	—	August 10, 2001	Palomar	NEAT	·	2.1 km	MPC · JPL
857670	2012 SR_{53}	—	August 25, 2012	Haleakala	Pan-STARRS 1	EUN	910 m	MPC · JPL
857671	2012 SO_{54}	—	September 19, 2012	Mount Lemmon	Mount Lemmon Survey	(895)	2.5 km	MPC · JPL
857672	2012 ST_{55}	—	September 17, 2012	Mount Lemmon	Mount Lemmon Survey	·	470 m	MPC · JPL
857673	2012 SQ_{60}	—	August 26, 2012	Haleakala	Pan-STARRS 1	·	500 m	MPC · JPL
857674	2012 SK_{62}	—	September 17, 2012	Mount Lemmon	Mount Lemmon Survey	NYS	800 m	MPC · JPL
857675	2012 SR_{62}	—	September 15, 2012	Kitt Peak	Spacewatch	·	1.4 km	MPC · JPL
857676	2012 SD_{63}	—	September 24, 2012	Mount Lemmon SkyCe	T. Vorobjov, Kostin, A.	·	2.3 km	MPC · JPL
857677	2012 SL_{63}	—	September 25, 2012	Mount Lemmon	Mount Lemmon Survey	H	350 m	MPC · JPL
857678	2012 SY_{63}	—	September 26, 2012	Mount Lemmon	Mount Lemmon Survey	·	1.3 km	MPC · JPL
857679	2012 SE_{67}	—	September 17, 2012	Mount Lemmon	Mount Lemmon Survey	L5	6.5 km	MPC · JPL
857680	2012 SS_{70}	—	September 21, 2012	Kitt Peak	Spacewatch	·	950 m	MPC · JPL
857681	2012 SX_{70}	—	September 21, 2012	Kitt Peak	Spacewatch	·	1.1 km	MPC · JPL
857682	2012 SD_{71}	—	September 22, 2012	Kitt Peak	Spacewatch	·	1.3 km	MPC · JPL
857683	2012 SS_{71}	—	September 21, 2012	Catalina	CSS	·	800 m	MPC · JPL
857684	2012 SY_{73}	—	September 19, 2012	Mount Lemmon	Mount Lemmon Survey	·	2.1 km	MPC · JPL
857685	2012 SP_{74}	—	September 26, 2012	Mount Lemmon	Mount Lemmon Survey	·	1.2 km	MPC · JPL
857686	2012 ST_{74}	—	September 16, 2012	ESA OGS	ESA OGS	·	1.4 km	MPC · JPL
857687	2012 SA_{75}	—	September 17, 2012	Mount Lemmon	Mount Lemmon Survey	·	820 m	MPC · JPL
857688	2012 SE_{75}	—	September 24, 2012	Mount Lemmon	Mount Lemmon Survey	H	420 m	MPC · JPL
857689	2012 SH_{75}	—	September 22, 2012	Kitt Peak	Spacewatch	H	310 m	MPC · JPL
857690	2012 SH_{76}	—	September 23, 2012	Kitt Peak	Spacewatch	·	1.3 km	MPC · JPL
857691	2012 SK_{76}	—	September 25, 2012	Mount Lemmon	Mount Lemmon Survey	·	1.1 km	MPC · JPL
857692	2012 SL_{76}	—	September 18, 2012	Mount Lemmon	Mount Lemmon Survey	·	2.1 km	MPC · JPL
857693	2012 SJ_{79}	—	September 17, 2012	Mount Lemmon	Mount Lemmon Survey	·	880 m	MPC · JPL
857694	2012 SM_{79}	—	September 17, 2012	Kitt Peak	Spacewatch	·	910 m	MPC · JPL
857695	2012 SZ_{79}	—	September 21, 2012	Mount Lemmon	Mount Lemmon Survey	·	990 m	MPC · JPL
857696	2012 SN_{81}	—	October 6, 1996	Kitt Peak	Spacewatch	·	2.0 km	MPC · JPL
857697	2012 SF_{84}	—	September 19, 2012	Mount Lemmon	Mount Lemmon Survey	·	1.2 km	MPC · JPL
857698	2012 SN_{84}	—	June 11, 2015	Haleakala	Pan-STARRS 1	V	450 m	MPC · JPL
857699	2012 ST_{84}	—	September 24, 2012	Mount Lemmon	Mount Lemmon Survey	·	1.6 km	MPC · JPL
857700	2012 SE_{85}	—	September 18, 2012	Mount Lemmon	Mount Lemmon Survey	EOS	1.1 km	MPC · JPL

== 857701–857800 ==
back to top

Designation			Discovery			Properties		Ref
Permanent	Provisional	Named after	Date	Site	Discoverer(s)	Category	Diam.	Ref
857701	2012 SE_{86}	—	September 21, 2012	Kitt Peak	Spacewatch	·	2.1 km	MPC · JPL
857702	2012 SK_{87}	—	September 17, 2012	Mount Lemmon	Mount Lemmon Survey	·	790 m	MPC · JPL
857703	2012 SN_{87}	—	August 26, 2012	Haleakala	Pan-STARRS 1	MRX	610 m	MPC · JPL
857704	2012 SG_{88}	—	September 19, 2012	Mount Lemmon	Mount Lemmon Survey	·	1.1 km	MPC · JPL
857705	2012 SH_{88}	—	September 18, 2012	Mount Lemmon	Mount Lemmon Survey	·	1.4 km	MPC · JPL
857706	2012 SB_{89}	—	September 15, 2012	Catalina	CSS	·	2.1 km	MPC · JPL
857707	2012 SE_{89}	—	September 25, 2012	Mount Lemmon	Mount Lemmon Survey	·	1.9 km	MPC · JPL
857708	2012 SP_{91}	—	September 24, 2012	Kitt Peak	Spacewatch	JUN	570 m	MPC · JPL
857709	2012 SK_{93}	—	September 7, 2008	Mount Lemmon	Mount Lemmon Survey	·	1.0 km	MPC · JPL
857710	2012 SW_{93}	—	September 22, 2012	Mount Lemmon	Mount Lemmon Survey	(5)	1.0 km	MPC · JPL
857711	2012 SH_{94}	—	September 19, 2012	Mount Lemmon	Mount Lemmon Survey	·	650 m	MPC · JPL
857712	2012 SM_{94}	—	September 19, 2012	Mount Lemmon	Mount Lemmon Survey	·	370 m	MPC · JPL
857713	2012 SN_{94}	—	September 22, 2012	Kitt Peak	Spacewatch	·	2.8 km	MPC · JPL
857714	2012 SC_{97}	—	September 25, 2012	Kitt Peak	Spacewatch	·	2.7 km	MPC · JPL
857715	2012 SF_{97}	—	September 26, 2012	Mount Lemmon	Mount Lemmon Survey	·	1.4 km	MPC · JPL
857716	2012 SG_{97}	—	September 20, 2012	Mount Lemmon	Mount Lemmon Survey	·	980 m	MPC · JPL
857717	2012 SN_{97}	—	September 26, 2012	Mount Lemmon	Mount Lemmon Survey	EUN	780 m	MPC · JPL
857718	2012 SJ_{98}	—	September 21, 2012	Mount Lemmon	Mount Lemmon Survey	·	850 m	MPC · JPL
857719	2012 SL_{98}	—	September 19, 2012	Mount Lemmon	Mount Lemmon Survey	·	1 km	MPC · JPL
857720	2012 SO_{98}	—	September 22, 2012	Tincana	Zolnowski, M., Kusiak, M.	·	1.2 km	MPC · JPL
857721	2012 SA_{99}	—	September 22, 2012	Kitt Peak	Spacewatch	·	860 m	MPC · JPL
857722	2012 SX_{99}	—	September 22, 2012	Kitt Peak	Spacewatch	·	1.8 km	MPC · JPL
857723	2012 SZ_{99}	—	September 17, 2012	Mount Lemmon	Mount Lemmon Survey	EUN	880 m	MPC · JPL
857724	2012 SD_{100}	—	September 17, 2012	Mount Lemmon	Mount Lemmon Survey	·	870 m	MPC · JPL
857725	2012 SJ_{101}	—	September 26, 2012	Haleakala	Pan-STARRS 1	H	390 m	MPC · JPL
857726	2012 SP_{102}	—	September 25, 2012	Mount Lemmon	Mount Lemmon Survey	·	950 m	MPC · JPL
857727	2012 SW_{103}	—	September 24, 2012	Mount Lemmon	Mount Lemmon Survey	L5	7.2 km	MPC · JPL
857728	2012 SX_{108}	—	September 21, 2012	Mount Lemmon	Mount Lemmon Survey	L5	6.5 km	MPC · JPL
857729	2012 TT_{2}	—	October 4, 2012	Haleakala	Pan-STARRS 1	H	350 m	MPC · JPL
857730	2012 TG_{3}	—	October 5, 2012	Haleakala	Pan-STARRS 1	·	1.3 km	MPC · JPL
857731	2012 TB_{6}	—	March 21, 2001	Kitt Peak	SKADS	·	930 m	MPC · JPL
857732	2012 TY_{6}	—	October 5, 2012	Nogales	M. Schwartz, P. R. Holvorcem	·	1.3 km	MPC · JPL
857733	2012 TZ_{6}	—	October 5, 2012	Kitt Peak	Spacewatch	·	480 m	MPC · JPL
857734	2012 TN_{8}	—	September 16, 2012	Kitt Peak	Spacewatch	·	2.1 km	MPC · JPL
857735	2012 TX_{10}	—	October 6, 2012	Mount Lemmon	Mount Lemmon Survey	·	420 m	MPC · JPL
857736	2012 TK_{11}	—	October 6, 2012	Mount Lemmon	Mount Lemmon Survey	·	2.0 km	MPC · JPL
857737	2012 TQ_{12}	—	September 23, 2012	Mount Lemmon	Mount Lemmon Survey	·	710 m	MPC · JPL
857738	2012 TY_{12}	—	October 6, 2012	Mount Lemmon	Mount Lemmon Survey	·	1.1 km	MPC · JPL
857739	2012 TA_{14}	—	July 20, 2001	Palomar	NEAT	·	730 m	MPC · JPL
857740	2012 TM_{14}	—	October 7, 2012	Haleakala	Pan-STARRS 1	H	320 m	MPC · JPL
857741	2012 TD_{15}	—	October 7, 2012	Haleakala	Pan-STARRS 1	·	630 m	MPC · JPL
857742	2012 TF_{15}	—	September 26, 2012	Haleakala	Pan-STARRS 1	H	320 m	MPC · JPL
857743	2012 TW_{15}	—	October 4, 2012	Mount Lemmon	Mount Lemmon Survey	·	1.0 km	MPC · JPL
857744	2012 TL_{19}	—	September 17, 2012	Kitt Peak	Spacewatch	THM	1.9 km	MPC · JPL
857745	2012 TC_{21}	—	October 5, 2012	Mount Lemmon	Mount Lemmon Survey	H	370 m	MPC · JPL
857746	2012 TR_{21}	—	September 28, 1994	Kitt Peak	Spacewatch	ERI	1.0 km	MPC · JPL
857747	2012 TG_{23}	—	October 8, 2012	Mount Lemmon	Mount Lemmon Survey	·	950 m	MPC · JPL
857748	2012 TA_{24}	—	November 18, 2008	Kitt Peak	Spacewatch	·	1.0 km	MPC · JPL
857749	2012 TB_{26}	—	October 19, 1999	Kitt Peak	Spacewatch	·	910 m	MPC · JPL
857750	2012 TL_{26}	—	September 16, 2012	Catalina	CSS	·	1.4 km	MPC · JPL
857751	2012 TS_{27}	—	October 8, 2012	Haleakala	Pan-STARRS 1	·	1.3 km	MPC · JPL
857752	2012 TD_{29}	—	March 10, 2005	Kitt Peak	Spacewatch	·	2.9 km	MPC · JPL
857753	2012 TG_{29}	—	September 21, 2012	Mount Lemmon SkyCe	T. Vorobjov, Kostin, A.	·	430 m	MPC · JPL
857754	2012 TP_{29}	—	September 18, 2012	Mount Lemmon	Mount Lemmon Survey	H	370 m	MPC · JPL
857755	2012 TE_{30}	—	September 15, 2012	ESA OGS	ESA OGS	·	390 m	MPC · JPL
857756	2012 TH_{30}	—	September 15, 2012	ESA OGS	ESA OGS	LIX	2.8 km	MPC · JPL
857757	2012 TT_{30}	—	September 13, 2012	Kislovodsk	ISON-Kislovodsk Observatory	·	1.4 km	MPC · JPL
857758	2012 TJ_{33}	—	November 17, 2007	Kitt Peak	Spacewatch	·	1.8 km	MPC · JPL
857759	2012 TY_{33}	—	October 6, 2012	Mount Lemmon	Mount Lemmon Survey	H	350 m	MPC · JPL
857760	2012 TK_{34}	—	April 2, 2011	Mount Lemmon	Mount Lemmon Survey	·	1.2 km	MPC · JPL
857761	2012 TH_{35}	—	October 8, 2012	Haleakala	Pan-STARRS 1	L5	5.9 km	MPC · JPL
857762	2012 TZ_{39}	—	October 8, 2012	Mount Lemmon	Mount Lemmon Survey	·	1.2 km	MPC · JPL
857763	2012 TD_{40}	—	October 8, 2012	Mount Lemmon	Mount Lemmon Survey	·	850 m	MPC · JPL
857764	2012 TK_{41}	—	September 24, 2012	Kitt Peak	Spacewatch	(2076)	630 m	MPC · JPL
857765	2012 TR_{42}	—	October 8, 2012	Mount Lemmon	Mount Lemmon Survey	LIX	2.5 km	MPC · JPL
857766	2012 TJ_{45}	—	September 15, 2012	La Sagra	OAM	·	1.5 km	MPC · JPL
857767	2012 TE_{46}	—	October 8, 2012	Mount Lemmon	Mount Lemmon Survey	·	1.3 km	MPC · JPL
857768	2012 TL_{49}	—	October 8, 2012	Haleakala	Pan-STARRS 1	EUN	690 m	MPC · JPL
857769	2012 TO_{49}	—	September 21, 2012	Kitt Peak	Spacewatch	·	1.1 km	MPC · JPL
857770	2012 TE_{51}	—	August 26, 2003	Cerro Tololo	Deep Ecliptic Survey	·	1.0 km	MPC · JPL
857771	2012 TV_{51}	—	October 7, 2012	Haleakala	Pan-STARRS 1	L5	8.3 km	MPC · JPL
857772	2012 TN_{53}	—	October 4, 2012	Haleakala	Pan-STARRS 1	L5	6.2 km	MPC · JPL
857773	2012 TS_{55}	—	September 15, 2012	Mount Lemmon	Mount Lemmon Survey	·	490 m	MPC · JPL
857774	2012 TK_{62}	—	October 3, 2003	Kitt Peak	Spacewatch	·	1.3 km	MPC · JPL
857775	2012 TL_{63}	—	October 8, 2012	Haleakala	Pan-STARRS 1	·	860 m	MPC · JPL
857776	2012 TT_{65}	—	October 8, 2012	Mount Lemmon	Mount Lemmon Survey	·	2.2 km	MPC · JPL
857777	2012 TV_{67}	—	October 8, 2012	Mount Lemmon	Mount Lemmon Survey	·	850 m	MPC · JPL
857778	2012 TZ_{67}	—	September 19, 2012	Mount Lemmon	Mount Lemmon Survey	·	1.1 km	MPC · JPL
857779	2012 TM_{68}	—	October 8, 2012	Mount Lemmon	Mount Lemmon Survey	·	1.3 km	MPC · JPL
857780	2012 TZ_{73}	—	October 9, 2012	Mount Lemmon	Mount Lemmon Survey	·	2.4 km	MPC · JPL
857781	2012 TF_{74}	—	October 9, 2012	Mount Lemmon	Mount Lemmon Survey	·	1.3 km	MPC · JPL
857782	2012 TW_{74}	—	October 9, 2012	Haleakala	Pan-STARRS 1	·	890 m	MPC · JPL
857783	2012 TZ_{75}	—	September 24, 2012	Kitt Peak	Spacewatch	L5	5.7 km	MPC · JPL
857784	2012 TA_{79}	—	October 10, 2012	Catalina	CSS	·	670 m	MPC · JPL
857785	2012 TF_{80}	—	September 23, 2012	Mount Lemmon	Mount Lemmon Survey	·	1.1 km	MPC · JPL
857786	2012 TU_{80}	—	September 17, 2012	Kitt Peak	Spacewatch	·	1.7 km	MPC · JPL
857787	2012 TX_{81}	—	November 16, 2001	Kitt Peak	Spacewatch	·	760 m	MPC · JPL
857788	2012 TQ_{84}	—	April 23, 2011	Kitt Peak	Spacewatch	·	1.1 km	MPC · JPL
857789	2012 TB_{89}	—	October 6, 2012	Haleakala	Pan-STARRS 1	(5)	1.1 km	MPC · JPL
857790	2012 TJ_{89}	—	September 16, 2012	Kitt Peak	Spacewatch	·	1.2 km	MPC · JPL
857791	2012 TJ_{93}	—	September 17, 2012	Kitt Peak	Spacewatch	·	730 m	MPC · JPL
857792	2012 TL_{93}	—	September 11, 1999	La Silla	Barbieri, C.	HNS	770 m	MPC · JPL
857793	2012 TB_{97}	—	October 8, 2012	Kitt Peak	Spacewatch	H	370 m	MPC · JPL
857794	2012 TT_{97}	—	September 16, 2012	Kitt Peak	Spacewatch	NYS	920 m	MPC · JPL
857795	2012 TP_{98}	—	October 8, 2012	Kitt Peak	Spacewatch	·	1.1 km	MPC · JPL
857796	2012 TB_{99}	—	October 8, 2012	Kitt Peak	Spacewatch	·	1.2 km	MPC · JPL
857797	2012 TU_{100}	—	October 8, 2012	Nogales	M. Schwartz, P. R. Holvorcem	H	320 m	MPC · JPL
857798	2012 TX_{101}	—	August 4, 2003	Kitt Peak	Spacewatch	·	950 m	MPC · JPL
857799	2012 TH_{102}	—	September 16, 2012	Kitt Peak	Spacewatch	·	1.0 km	MPC · JPL
857800	2012 TF_{105}	—	October 24, 1995	Kitt Peak	Spacewatch	·	2.0 km	MPC · JPL

== 857801–857900 ==
back to top

Designation			Discovery			Properties		Ref
Permanent	Provisional	Named after	Date	Site	Discoverer(s)	Category	Diam.	Ref
857801	2012 TT_{110}	—	October 10, 2012	Mount Lemmon	Mount Lemmon Survey	V	390 m	MPC · JPL
857802	2012 TS_{112}	—	October 10, 2012	Mount Lemmon	Mount Lemmon Survey	·	1.0 km	MPC · JPL
857803	2012 TK_{114}	—	October 10, 2012	Mount Lemmon	Mount Lemmon Survey	·	890 m	MPC · JPL
857804	2012 TM_{114}	—	September 25, 2012	Kitt Peak	Spacewatch	·	700 m	MPC · JPL
857805	2012 TE_{115}	—	October 10, 2012	Mount Lemmon	Mount Lemmon Survey	·	1.2 km	MPC · JPL
857806	2012 TV_{115}	—	October 10, 2012	Mount Lemmon	Mount Lemmon Survey	·	1.3 km	MPC · JPL
857807	2012 TK_{117}	—	February 4, 2003	La Silla	Barbieri, C.	·	850 m	MPC · JPL
857808	2012 TF_{119}	—	November 30, 2008	Kitt Peak	Spacewatch	·	1.0 km	MPC · JPL
857809	2012 TY_{119}	—	November 25, 2009	Mount Lemmon	Mount Lemmon Survey	·	550 m	MPC · JPL
857810	2012 TS_{120}	—	October 10, 2012	Mount Lemmon	Mount Lemmon Survey	·	1.2 km	MPC · JPL
857811	2012 TU_{122}	—	October 8, 2012	Haleakala	Pan-STARRS 1	L5	5.5 km	MPC · JPL
857812	2012 TM_{124}	—	October 11, 2012	Haleakala	Pan-STARRS 1	L5	6.6 km	MPC · JPL
857813	2012 TL_{125}	—	October 29, 2005	Catalina	CSS	·	790 m	MPC · JPL
857814	2012 TP_{127}	—	October 6, 2012	Haleakala	Pan-STARRS 1	·	2.2 km	MPC · JPL
857815	2012 TQ_{127}	—	October 6, 2012	Haleakala	Pan-STARRS 1	H	420 m	MPC · JPL
857816	2012 TV_{129}	—	September 18, 2012	Kitt Peak	Spacewatch	·	1.5 km	MPC · JPL
857817	2012 TM_{130}	—	October 6, 2012	Kitt Peak	Spacewatch	·	1.1 km	MPC · JPL
857818	2012 TW_{130}	—	October 7, 2012	Oukaïmeden	C. Rinner	·	2.1 km	MPC · JPL
857819	2012 TN_{131}	—	October 8, 2012	Kitt Peak	Spacewatch	·	430 m	MPC · JPL
857820	2012 TY_{131}	—	October 9, 2012	Kitt Peak	Spacewatch	·	1.2 km	MPC · JPL
857821	2012 TH_{132}	—	September 22, 2012	Nogales	M. Schwartz, P. R. Holvorcem	(1547)	1.6 km	MPC · JPL
857822	2012 TA_{134}	—	October 5, 2012	Haleakala	Pan-STARRS 1	MAS	540 m	MPC · JPL
857823	2012 TH_{135}	—	March 5, 2011	Catalina	CSS	H	370 m	MPC · JPL
857824	2012 TK_{135}	—	October 6, 2012	Haleakala	Pan-STARRS 1	(1547)	1.0 km	MPC · JPL
857825	2012 TL_{135}	—	September 24, 2012	Kislovodsk	ISON-Kislovodsk Observatory	·	1.5 km	MPC · JPL
857826	2012 TQ_{135}	—	September 8, 2004	Palomar	NEAT	H	310 m	MPC · JPL
857827	2012 TS_{135}	—	October 7, 2012	Haleakala	Pan-STARRS 1	·	460 m	MPC · JPL
857828	2012 TE_{136}	—	November 19, 2008	Catalina	CSS	·	1.3 km	MPC · JPL
857829	2012 TZ_{138}	—	September 14, 2012	Mount Lemmon	Mount Lemmon Survey	·	800 m	MPC · JPL
857830	2012 TS_{139}	—	October 7, 2012	Haleakala	Pan-STARRS 1	H	360 m	MPC · JPL
857831	2012 TZ_{139}	—	October 10, 2012	Haleakala	Pan-STARRS 1	·	850 m	MPC · JPL
857832	2012 TH_{140}	—	October 11, 2012	Haleakala	Pan-STARRS 1	·	1.2 km	MPC · JPL
857833	2012 TZ_{142}	—	October 8, 2012	Mount Lemmon	Mount Lemmon Survey	·	840 m	MPC · JPL
857834	2012 TN_{145}	—	October 10, 2012	Bergisch Gladbach	W. Bickel	·	1.5 km	MPC · JPL
857835	2012 TX_{145}	—	October 11, 2012	Mount Lemmon	Mount Lemmon Survey	·	150 m	MPC · JPL
857836	2012 TX_{146}	—	August 25, 2012	Kitt Peak	Spacewatch	EUN	820 m	MPC · JPL
857837	2012 TJ_{147}	—	October 6, 2012	Catalina	CSS	·	1.2 km	MPC · JPL
857838	2012 TV_{149}	—	October 8, 2012	Mount Lemmon	Mount Lemmon Survey	·	390 m	MPC · JPL
857839	2012 TQ_{153}	—	September 17, 2012	Kitt Peak	Spacewatch	·	1.5 km	MPC · JPL
857840	2012 TR_{154}	—	September 17, 2012	Kitt Peak	Spacewatch	·	2.0 km	MPC · JPL
857841	2012 TJ_{159}	—	October 8, 2012	Mount Lemmon	Mount Lemmon Survey	EOS	1.2 km	MPC · JPL
857842	2012 TT_{159}	—	September 15, 2012	ESA OGS	ESA OGS	·	1.1 km	MPC · JPL
857843	2012 TE_{160}	—	September 18, 2012	Kitt Peak	Spacewatch	·	420 m	MPC · JPL
857844	2012 TF_{161}	—	October 8, 2012	Haleakala	Pan-STARRS 1	·	1.3 km	MPC · JPL
857845	2012 TM_{162}	—	October 8, 2012	Haleakala	Pan-STARRS 1	·	980 m	MPC · JPL
857846	2012 TT_{162}	—	September 23, 2012	Kitt Peak	Spacewatch	JUN	740 m	MPC · JPL
857847	2012 TZ_{162}	—	October 8, 2012	Haleakala	Pan-STARRS 1	·	1.2 km	MPC · JPL
857848	2012 TW_{163}	—	September 23, 2012	Kitt Peak	Spacewatch	·	640 m	MPC · JPL
857849	2012 TC_{165}	—	September 28, 2003	Kitt Peak	Spacewatch	·	1.1 km	MPC · JPL
857850	2012 TM_{165}	—	October 8, 2012	Haleakala	Pan-STARRS 1	·	1.2 km	MPC · JPL
857851	2012 TT_{166}	—	October 8, 2012	Haleakala	Pan-STARRS 1	·	980 m	MPC · JPL
857852	2012 TZ_{167}	—	October 8, 2012	Haleakala	Pan-STARRS 1	·	2.1 km	MPC · JPL
857853	2012 TC_{169}	—	December 1, 2003	Kitt Peak	Spacewatch	·	1.8 km	MPC · JPL
857854	2012 TQ_{169}	—	October 8, 2012	Haleakala	Pan-STARRS 1	·	1.6 km	MPC · JPL
857855	2012 TP_{170}	—	September 15, 2012	Mount Lemmon	Mount Lemmon Survey	MAS	440 m	MPC · JPL
857856	2012 TC_{172}	—	September 24, 2012	Kitt Peak	Spacewatch	·	930 m	MPC · JPL
857857	2012 TM_{176}	—	September 22, 2012	Kitt Peak	Spacewatch	·	800 m	MPC · JPL
857858	2012 TW_{181}	—	October 26, 2009	Kitt Peak	Spacewatch	·	560 m	MPC · JPL
857859	2012 TZ_{181}	—	October 9, 2012	Haleakala	Pan-STARRS 1	H	320 m	MPC · JPL
857860	2012 TK_{182}	—	October 9, 2012	Haleakala	Pan-STARRS 1	·	1.1 km	MPC · JPL
857861	2012 TL_{193}	—	August 28, 2012	Mount Lemmon	Mount Lemmon Survey	·	1.7 km	MPC · JPL
857862	2012 TV_{195}	—	October 10, 2012	Kitt Peak	Spacewatch	(1547)	1.1 km	MPC · JPL
857863	2012 TO_{198}	—	September 16, 2012	Kitt Peak	Spacewatch	·	920 m	MPC · JPL
857864	2012 TR_{198}	—	October 29, 2005	Catalina	CSS	·	830 m	MPC · JPL
857865	2012 TV_{199}	—	October 11, 2012	Kitt Peak	Spacewatch	·	1.2 km	MPC · JPL
857866	2012 TY_{199}	—	September 18, 2003	Kitt Peak	Spacewatch	·	1.1 km	MPC · JPL
857867	2012 TM_{202}	—	October 24, 2008	Kitt Peak	Spacewatch	·	920 m	MPC · JPL
857868	2012 TB_{204}	—	October 11, 2012	Mount Lemmon	Mount Lemmon Survey	·	1.9 km	MPC · JPL
857869	2012 TX_{204}	—	October 11, 2012	Mount Lemmon	Mount Lemmon Survey	·	1.1 km	MPC · JPL
857870	2012 TK_{205}	—	October 7, 2012	Haleakala	Pan-STARRS 1	·	1.0 km	MPC · JPL
857871	2012 TE_{206}	—	October 11, 2012	Mount Lemmon	Mount Lemmon Survey	EUN	650 m	MPC · JPL
857872	2012 TM_{206}	—	October 11, 2012	Mount Lemmon	Mount Lemmon Survey	·	600 m	MPC · JPL
857873	2012 TY_{206}	—	October 11, 2012	Mount Lemmon	Mount Lemmon Survey	·	1.2 km	MPC · JPL
857874	2012 TX_{207}	—	October 11, 2012	Kitt Peak	Spacewatch	TIR	1.9 km	MPC · JPL
857875	2012 TE_{209}	—	October 11, 2012	Mount Lemmon	Mount Lemmon Survey	V	460 m	MPC · JPL
857876	2012 TL_{209}	—	October 11, 2012	Mount Lemmon	Mount Lemmon Survey	HNS	710 m	MPC · JPL
857877	2012 TH_{215}	—	October 8, 2012	Mayhill-ISON	L. Elenin	JUN	960 m	MPC · JPL
857878	2012 TZ_{216}	—	October 13, 2012	Kitt Peak	Spacewatch	·	2.4 km	MPC · JPL
857879	2012 TR_{217}	—	October 14, 2012	ESA OGS	ESA OGS	·	1.0 km	MPC · JPL
857880	2012 TF_{219}	—	October 14, 2012	Kitt Peak	Spacewatch	H	310 m	MPC · JPL
857881	2012 TZ_{223}	—	October 5, 2012	Mount Lemmon	Mount Lemmon Survey	·	940 m	MPC · JPL
857882	2012 TF_{225}	—	October 8, 2012	Mount Lemmon	Mount Lemmon Survey	·	1.2 km	MPC · JPL
857883	2012 TK_{226}	—	October 8, 2012	Mount Lemmon	Mount Lemmon Survey	V	390 m	MPC · JPL
857884	2012 TK_{229}	—	September 24, 2012	Kitt Peak	Spacewatch	·	1.1 km	MPC · JPL
857885	2012 TM_{230}	—	November 17, 2008	Kitt Peak	Spacewatch	(5)	850 m	MPC · JPL
857886	2012 TP_{230}	—	October 8, 2012	Haleakala	Pan-STARRS 1	·	1.4 km	MPC · JPL
857887	2012 TD_{231}	—	October 19, 2003	Kitt Peak	Spacewatch	AEO	930 m	MPC · JPL
857888	2012 TR_{235}	—	September 23, 2008	Mount Lemmon	Mount Lemmon Survey	·	1.0 km	MPC · JPL
857889	2012 TV_{239}	—	September 22, 2012	Kitt Peak	Spacewatch	T_{j} (2.99) · 3:2	3.3 km	MPC · JPL
857890	2012 TV_{240}	—	October 8, 2012	Haleakala	Pan-STARRS 1	·	1.1 km	MPC · JPL
857891	2012 TC_{241}	—	October 8, 2012	Kitt Peak	Spacewatch	·	1.0 km	MPC · JPL
857892	2012 TC_{243}	—	August 7, 2008	Kitt Peak	Spacewatch	CLA	1.1 km	MPC · JPL
857893	2012 TZ_{243}	—	October 8, 2012	Haleakala	Pan-STARRS 1	L5	7.1 km	MPC · JPL
857894	2012 TZ_{245}	—	September 16, 2012	Kitt Peak	Spacewatch	·	2.3 km	MPC · JPL
857895	2012 TH_{246}	—	December 15, 2001	Socorro	LINEAR	·	1.0 km	MPC · JPL
857896	2012 TM_{247}	—	October 11, 2012	Kitt Peak	Spacewatch	·	1.7 km	MPC · JPL
857897	2012 TP_{248}	—	October 11, 2012	Haleakala	Pan-STARRS 1	(5)	800 m	MPC · JPL
857898	2012 TA_{249}	—	October 11, 2012	Haleakala	Pan-STARRS 1	·	1.1 km	MPC · JPL
857899	2012 TS_{251}	—	October 11, 2012	Haleakala	Pan-STARRS 1	·	470 m	MPC · JPL
857900	2012 TQ_{252}	—	October 11, 2012	Haleakala	Pan-STARRS 1	·	1.9 km	MPC · JPL

== 857901–858000 ==
back to top

Designation			Discovery			Properties		Ref
Permanent	Provisional	Named after	Date	Site	Discoverer(s)	Category	Diam.	Ref
857901	2012 TG_{254}	—	October 11, 2012	Piszkéstető	K. Sárneczky	·	1.3 km	MPC · JPL
857902	2012 TC_{256}	—	October 15, 2012	Mount Lemmon SkyCe	T. Vorobjov, Kostin, A.	·	410 m	MPC · JPL
857903	2012 TJ_{256}	—	October 15, 2012	Mount Lemmon SkyCe	T. Vorobjov, Kostin, A.	·	1.5 km	MPC · JPL
857904	2012 TN_{257}	—	September 23, 2012	Kitt Peak	Spacewatch	·	1.2 km	MPC · JPL
857905	2012 TY_{259}	—	April 5, 2010	Mount Lemmon	Mount Lemmon Survey	VER	2.1 km	MPC · JPL
857906	2012 TZ_{259}	—	October 5, 2012	Haleakala	Pan-STARRS 1	·	2.2 km	MPC · JPL
857907	2012 TC_{260}	—	October 6, 2012	Mount Lemmon	Mount Lemmon Survey	·	1.7 km	MPC · JPL
857908	2012 TO_{260}	—	October 7, 2012	Haleakala	Pan-STARRS 1	HOF	2.0 km	MPC · JPL
857909	2012 TY_{260}	—	October 7, 2012	Haleakala	Pan-STARRS 1	·	430 m	MPC · JPL
857910	2012 TR_{264}	—	October 8, 2012	Haleakala	Pan-STARRS 1	·	960 m	MPC · JPL
857911	2012 TA_{265}	—	September 15, 2012	Kitt Peak	Spacewatch	·	490 m	MPC · JPL
857912	2012 TQ_{267}	—	November 19, 2008	Kitt Peak	Spacewatch	·	1.2 km	MPC · JPL
857913	2012 TD_{270}	—	October 5, 2012	Haleakala	Pan-STARRS 1	·	860 m	MPC · JPL
857914	2012 TO_{273}	—	October 15, 2012	Mount Lemmon	Mount Lemmon Survey	·	1.0 km	MPC · JPL
857915	2012 TN_{276}	—	October 11, 2012	Haleakala	Pan-STARRS 1	EOS	1.3 km	MPC · JPL
857916	2012 TN_{278}	—	October 11, 2012	Haleakala	Pan-STARRS 1	EOS	1.2 km	MPC · JPL
857917	2012 TS_{282}	—	October 13, 2012	Nogales	M. Schwartz, P. R. Holvorcem	THB	2.5 km	MPC · JPL
857918	2012 TA_{283}	—	October 14, 2012	Nogales	M. Schwartz, P. R. Holvorcem	T_{j} (2.97) · 3:2	3.7 km	MPC · JPL
857919	2012 TQ_{283}	—	October 31, 1999	Kitt Peak	Spacewatch	·	410 m	MPC · JPL
857920	2012 TF_{284}	—	September 16, 2012	Kitt Peak	Spacewatch	EUN	810 m	MPC · JPL
857921	2012 TZ_{284}	—	September 21, 2012	Mount Lemmon	Mount Lemmon Survey	JUN	540 m	MPC · JPL
857922	2012 TH_{290}	—	October 14, 2012	Kitt Peak	Spacewatch	·	490 m	MPC · JPL
857923	2012 TM_{293}	—	October 14, 2012	Kitt Peak	Spacewatch	·	960 m	MPC · JPL
857924	2012 TW_{293}	—	October 14, 2012	Kitt Peak	Spacewatch	·	1.2 km	MPC · JPL
857925	2012 TA_{296}	—	September 21, 2012	Catalina	CSS	·	960 m	MPC · JPL
857926	2012 TS_{298}	—	October 15, 2012	Mount Lemmon	Mount Lemmon Survey	·	1.7 km	MPC · JPL
857927	2012 TT_{298}	—	October 15, 2012	Mount Lemmon	Mount Lemmon Survey	·	1.5 km	MPC · JPL
857928	2012 TZ_{301}	—	October 7, 2012	Haleakala	Pan-STARRS 1	·	1.1 km	MPC · JPL
857929	2012 TF_{303}	—	October 8, 2012	Mount Lemmon	Mount Lemmon Survey	·	1.2 km	MPC · JPL
857930	2012 TR_{303}	—	September 18, 2012	Kitt Peak	Spacewatch	MAS	500 m	MPC · JPL
857931	2012 TQ_{316}	—	October 14, 2012	Catalina	CSS	·	1.1 km	MPC · JPL
857932	2012 TK_{318}	—	November 18, 2008	Kitt Peak	Spacewatch	·	1.1 km	MPC · JPL
857933	2012 TM_{318}	—	October 6, 2012	Haleakala	Pan-STARRS 1	·	1.5 km	MPC · JPL
857934	2012 TA_{323}	—	October 9, 2012	Haleakala	Pan-STARRS 1	L5	6.0 km	MPC · JPL
857935	2012 TY_{324}	—	October 8, 2012	Kitt Peak	Spacewatch	·	2.0 km	MPC · JPL
857936	2012 TM_{325}	—	September 18, 2012	Mount Lemmon	Mount Lemmon Survey	·	1.4 km	MPC · JPL
857937	2012 TV_{326}	—	October 8, 2012	Mount Lemmon	Mount Lemmon Survey	·	1.0 km	MPC · JPL
857938	2012 TG_{328}	—	October 8, 2012	Mount Lemmon	Mount Lemmon Survey	·	960 m	MPC · JPL
857939	2012 TH_{328}	—	November 18, 2008	Kitt Peak	Spacewatch	·	1.0 km	MPC · JPL
857940	2012 TN_{328}	—	October 8, 2012	Mount Lemmon	Mount Lemmon Survey	MRX	590 m	MPC · JPL
857941	2012 TA_{329}	—	October 8, 2012	Haleakala	Pan-STARRS 1	THM	1.7 km	MPC · JPL
857942	2012 TU_{329}	—	October 11, 2012	Kitt Peak	Spacewatch	ADE	1.2 km	MPC · JPL
857943	2012 TF_{330}	—	October 14, 2012	Kitt Peak	Spacewatch	(5)	1.0 km	MPC · JPL
857944	2012 TT_{330}	—	October 8, 2012	Catalina	CSS	·	1.5 km	MPC · JPL
857945	2012 TS_{332}	—	October 9, 2012	Mount Lemmon	Mount Lemmon Survey	THM	1.7 km	MPC · JPL
857946	2012 TX_{332}	—	April 10, 2014	Haleakala	Pan-STARRS 1	H	390 m	MPC · JPL
857947	2012 TD_{333}	—	October 6, 2012	Haleakala	Pan-STARRS 1	·	430 m	MPC · JPL
857948	2012 TE_{334}	—	February 22, 2014	Mount Lemmon	Mount Lemmon Survey	·	1.2 km	MPC · JPL
857949	2012 TH_{335}	—	December 30, 2013	Kitt Peak	Spacewatch	·	1.4 km	MPC · JPL
857950	2012 TP_{335}	—	October 10, 2012	Haleakala	Pan-STARRS 1	·	1.1 km	MPC · JPL
857951	2012 TR_{335}	—	October 9, 2012	Mount Lemmon	Mount Lemmon Survey	·	830 m	MPC · JPL
857952	2012 TY_{335}	—	October 9, 2012	Mount Lemmon	Mount Lemmon Survey	EUN	850 m	MPC · JPL
857953	2012 TX_{336}	—	October 14, 2012	Kitt Peak	Spacewatch	EUN	860 m	MPC · JPL
857954	2012 TJ_{337}	—	October 10, 2012	Kitt Peak	Spacewatch	THM	2.1 km	MPC · JPL
857955	2012 TA_{339}	—	October 6, 2012	Haleakala	Pan-STARRS 1	·	1.3 km	MPC · JPL
857956	2012 TC_{339}	—	October 10, 2012	Kitt Peak	Spacewatch	·	1.4 km	MPC · JPL
857957	2012 TQ_{339}	—	October 11, 2012	Haleakala	Pan-STARRS 1	(1547)	1.1 km	MPC · JPL
857958	2012 TC_{340}	—	November 4, 2007	Kitt Peak	Spacewatch	·	1.4 km	MPC · JPL
857959	2012 TE_{340}	—	October 9, 2012	Mount Lemmon	Mount Lemmon Survey	·	1.9 km	MPC · JPL
857960	2012 TE_{341}	—	October 6, 2012	Haleakala	Pan-STARRS 1	·	1.1 km	MPC · JPL
857961	2012 TP_{341}	—	October 15, 2012	Haleakala	Pan-STARRS 1	·	1.1 km	MPC · JPL
857962	2012 TT_{341}	—	October 10, 2012	Haleakala	Pan-STARRS 1	·	1.2 km	MPC · JPL
857963	2012 TC_{342}	—	October 6, 2012	Haleakala	Pan-STARRS 1	·	1.0 km	MPC · JPL
857964	2012 TQ_{342}	—	October 7, 2012	Haleakala	Pan-STARRS 1	·	1.2 km	MPC · JPL
857965	2012 TA_{344}	—	October 6, 2012	Haleakala	Pan-STARRS 1	·	880 m	MPC · JPL
857966	2012 TR_{345}	—	October 9, 2012	Mount Lemmon	Mount Lemmon Survey	·	1.8 km	MPC · JPL
857967	2012 TE_{346}	—	October 10, 2012	Mount Lemmon	Mount Lemmon Survey	DOR	1.5 km	MPC · JPL
857968	2012 TX_{346}	—	October 9, 2012	Mount Lemmon	Mount Lemmon Survey	HNS	730 m	MPC · JPL
857969	2012 TH_{348}	—	October 8, 2012	Mount Lemmon	Mount Lemmon Survey	·	2.0 km	MPC · JPL
857970	2012 TE_{350}	—	January 15, 2018	Haleakala	Pan-STARRS 1	PHO	700 m	MPC · JPL
857971	2012 TT_{350}	—	October 10, 2012	Mount Lemmon	Mount Lemmon Survey	KON	1.5 km	MPC · JPL
857972	2012 TD_{351}	—	October 9, 2012	Mount Lemmon	Mount Lemmon Survey	L5	6.4 km	MPC · JPL
857973	2012 TG_{351}	—	January 28, 2017	Haleakala	Pan-STARRS 1	L5	5.9 km	MPC · JPL
857974	2012 TJ_{352}	—	October 11, 2012	Haleakala	Pan-STARRS 1	EOS	1.4 km	MPC · JPL
857975	2012 TG_{354}	—	October 10, 2012	Mount Lemmon	Mount Lemmon Survey	·	2.8 km	MPC · JPL
857976	2012 TC_{356}	—	October 8, 2012	Haleakala	Pan-STARRS 1	·	1.1 km	MPC · JPL
857977	2012 TD_{356}	—	October 8, 2012	Kitt Peak	Spacewatch	V	470 m	MPC · JPL
857978	2012 TE_{356}	—	October 11, 2012	Haleakala	Pan-STARRS 1	·	2.3 km	MPC · JPL
857979	2012 TK_{356}	—	October 15, 2012	Haleakala	Pan-STARRS 1	·	1.8 km	MPC · JPL
857980	2012 TM_{356}	—	October 8, 2012	Kitt Peak	Spacewatch	·	1.3 km	MPC · JPL
857981	2012 TU_{357}	—	October 6, 2012	Mount Lemmon	Mount Lemmon Survey	AEO	950 m	MPC · JPL
857982	2012 TP_{358}	—	October 11, 2012	Haleakala	Pan-STARRS 1	·	1.7 km	MPC · JPL
857983	2012 TH_{359}	—	October 9, 2012	Haleakala	Pan-STARRS 1	HOF	1.8 km	MPC · JPL
857984	2012 TM_{359}	—	October 6, 2012	Haleakala	Pan-STARRS 1	·	1.0 km	MPC · JPL
857985	2012 TX_{359}	—	October 14, 2012	Kitt Peak	Spacewatch	·	1.0 km	MPC · JPL
857986	2012 TL_{360}	—	October 15, 2012	Haleakala	Pan-STARRS 1	VER	1.8 km	MPC · JPL
857987	2012 TO_{360}	—	October 14, 2012	Kitt Peak	Spacewatch	·	810 m	MPC · JPL
857988	2012 TS_{361}	—	October 14, 2012	Kitt Peak	Spacewatch	EOS	1.3 km	MPC · JPL
857989	2012 TV_{361}	—	October 9, 2012	Haleakala	Pan-STARRS 1	(5)	830 m	MPC · JPL
857990	2012 TE_{362}	—	October 6, 2012	Haleakala	Pan-STARRS 1	·	1.2 km	MPC · JPL
857991	2012 TA_{363}	—	October 10, 2012	Mount Lemmon	Mount Lemmon Survey	·	1.8 km	MPC · JPL
857992	2012 TK_{363}	—	October 11, 2012	Haleakala	Pan-STARRS 1	H	320 m	MPC · JPL
857993	2012 TQ_{366}	—	October 8, 2012	Haleakala	Pan-STARRS 1	·	930 m	MPC · JPL
857994	2012 TG_{368}	—	October 11, 2012	Mount Lemmon	Mount Lemmon Survey	·	840 m	MPC · JPL
857995	2012 TO_{368}	—	October 10, 2012	Mount Lemmon	Mount Lemmon Survey	·	440 m	MPC · JPL
857996	2012 TS_{368}	—	October 9, 2012	Mount Lemmon	Mount Lemmon Survey	·	500 m	MPC · JPL
857997	2012 TR_{369}	—	October 9, 2012	Haleakala	Pan-STARRS 1	·	440 m	MPC · JPL
857998	2012 TU_{369}	—	October 10, 2012	Mount Lemmon	Mount Lemmon Survey	L5	5.7 km	MPC · JPL
857999	2012 TZ_{369}	—	October 11, 2012	Haleakala	Pan-STARRS 1	·	1.3 km	MPC · JPL
858000	2012 TS_{371}	—	October 8, 2012	Mount Lemmon	Mount Lemmon Survey	L5	5.6 km	MPC · JPL

back to top
