= List of minor planets: 806001–807000 =

The following is a partial list of minor planets, running from minor-planet number 806001 through 807000, inclusive. The primary data for this and other partial lists is based on JPL's "Small-Body Orbital Elements" and data available from the Minor Planet Center. Critical list information is also provided by the MPC, unless otherwise specified from Lowell Observatory. A detailed description of the table's columns and additional sources are given on the main page including a complete list of every page in this series, and a statistical break-up on the dynamical classification of minor planets.

Also see the summary list of all named bodies in numerical and alphabetical order, and the corresponding naming citations for the number range of this particular list. New namings may only be added to this list after official publication, as the preannouncement of names is condemned by the Working Group for Small Bodies Nomenclature of the International Astronomical Union.

Near-Earth obj.	MBA (inner)	MBA (outer)	Centaur
Mars-crosser	MBA (middle)	Jupiter trojan	Trans-Neptunian obj.
Unclassified

== 806001–806100 ==
Designation			Discovery			Properties		Ref
Permanent	Provisional	Named after	Date	Site	Discoverer(s)	Category	Diam.	Ref
806001	2016 MX_{6}	—	June 29, 2016	Haleakala	Pan-STARRS 1	·	1.5 km	MPC · JPL
806002	2016 MY_{6}	—	June 28, 2016	Haleakala	Pan-STARRS 1	EUN	950 m	MPC · JPL
806003	2016 MZ_{8}	—	January 17, 2015	Haleakala	Pan-STARRS 1	·	1.3 km	MPC · JPL
806004	2016 NM_{1}	—	July 5, 2016	Haleakala	Pan-STARRS 1	·	570 m	MPC · JPL
806005	2016 NZ_{5}	—	March 18, 2015	Haleakala	Pan-STARRS 1	·	1.8 km	MPC · JPL
806006	2016 NL_{6}	—	July 3, 2016	Mount Lemmon	Mount Lemmon Survey	LUT	2.7 km	MPC · JPL
806007	2016 NL_{7}	—	July 3, 2016	Mount Lemmon	Mount Lemmon Survey	·	1.1 km	MPC · JPL
806008	2016 NC_{9}	—	July 4, 2016	Haleakala	Pan-STARRS 1	·	1.9 km	MPC · JPL
806009	2016 NH_{15}	—	July 5, 2016	Mount Lemmon	Mount Lemmon Survey	AMO	230 m	MPC · JPL
806010	2016 NJ_{17}	—	July 5, 2016	Haleakala	Pan-STARRS 1	·	1.7 km	MPC · JPL
806011	2016 NY_{23}	—	May 21, 2015	Haleakala	Pan-STARRS 1	·	1.8 km	MPC · JPL
806012	2016 NU_{25}	—	September 21, 2011	Haleakala	Pan-STARRS 1	·	1.8 km	MPC · JPL
806013	2016 NE_{27}	—	July 8, 2016	Haleakala	Pan-STARRS 1	MAR	640 m	MPC · JPL
806014	2016 NZ_{31}	—	September 26, 2006	Kitt Peak	Spacewatch	·	2.0 km	MPC · JPL
806015	2016 NS_{35}	—	July 12, 2016	Mount Lemmon	Mount Lemmon Survey	·	1.2 km	MPC · JPL
806016	2016 NO_{40}	—	July 12, 2016	Mount Lemmon	Mount Lemmon Survey	·	1.5 km	MPC · JPL
806017	2016 NL_{43}	—	April 18, 2015	Mount Lemmon	Mount Lemmon Survey	EMA	2.2 km	MPC · JPL
806018	2016 NW_{50}	—	August 26, 2005	Palomar Mountain	NEAT	·	890 m	MPC · JPL
806019	2016 NJ_{54}	—	July 8, 2016	Haleakala	Pan-STARRS 1	·	1.4 km	MPC · JPL
806020	2016 NO_{57}	—	August 26, 2011	Westfield	International Astronomical Search Collaboration	H	350 m	MPC · JPL
806021	2016 NQ_{62}	—	July 11, 2016	Haleakala	Pan-STARRS 1	VER	2.3 km	MPC · JPL
806022	2016 NV_{62}	—	July 11, 2016	Haleakala	Pan-STARRS 1	·	1.5 km	MPC · JPL
806023	2016 NA_{63}	—	July 11, 2016	Haleakala	Pan-STARRS 1	·	1.8 km	MPC · JPL
806024	2016 NK_{66}	—	September 3, 2008	Kitt Peak	Spacewatch	·	900 m	MPC · JPL
806025	2016 NG_{67}	—	November 25, 2006	Mount Lemmon	Mount Lemmon Survey	·	1.8 km	MPC · JPL
806026	2016 NK_{68}	—	July 6, 2016	Haleakala	Pan-STARRS 1	·	1.5 km	MPC · JPL
806027	2016 NJ_{74}	—	July 11, 2016	Haleakala	Pan-STARRS 1	·	1.2 km	MPC · JPL
806028	2016 NA_{75}	—	July 14, 2016	Haleakala	Pan-STARRS 1	·	1.5 km	MPC · JPL
806029	2016 NC_{76}	—	July 4, 2016	Haleakala	Pan-STARRS 1	·	1.7 km	MPC · JPL
806030	2016 NV_{78}	—	April 23, 2015	Haleakala	Pan-STARRS 1	·	1.0 km	MPC · JPL
806031	2016 NF_{83}	—	July 11, 2016	Haleakala	Pan-STARRS 1	·	2.3 km	MPC · JPL
806032	2016 NG_{83}	—	July 11, 2016	Haleakala	Pan-STARRS 1	·	1.7 km	MPC · JPL
806033	2016 NJ_{83}	—	August 27, 2011	Haleakala	Pan-STARRS 1	·	1.6 km	MPC · JPL
806034	2016 NQ_{84}	—	September 23, 2011	Kitt Peak	Spacewatch	·	1.9 km	MPC · JPL
806035	2016 NC_{85}	—	August 27, 2005	Palomar Mountain	NEAT	LIX	2.6 km	MPC · JPL
806036	2016 NN_{85}	—	April 23, 2015	Haleakala	Pan-STARRS 1	·	1.5 km	MPC · JPL
806037	2016 NS_{91}	—	July 6, 2016	Haleakala	Pan-STARRS 1	EUP	3.5 km	MPC · JPL
806038	2016 NU_{91}	—	July 5, 2016	Haleakala	Pan-STARRS 1	EOS	1.3 km	MPC · JPL
806039	2016 NH_{92}	—	June 8, 2016	Haleakala	Pan-STARRS 1	EOS	1.2 km	MPC · JPL
806040	2016 NR_{93}	—	July 5, 2016	Haleakala	Pan-STARRS 1	·	2.5 km	MPC · JPL
806041	2016 NS_{97}	—	July 14, 2016	Haleakala	Pan-STARRS 1	·	480 m	MPC · JPL
806042	2016 NE_{101}	—	July 11, 2016	Haleakala	Pan-STARRS 1	·	920 m	MPC · JPL
806043	2016 NA_{104}	—	July 11, 2016	Haleakala	Pan-STARRS 1	·	1.4 km	MPC · JPL
806044	2016 NG_{104}	—	July 5, 2016	Haleakala	Pan-STARRS 1	·	2.1 km	MPC · JPL
806045	2016 NP_{104}	—	July 5, 2016	Haleakala	Pan-STARRS 1	·	2.5 km	MPC · JPL
806046	2016 NK_{106}	—	July 4, 2016	Haleakala	Pan-STARRS 1	EOS	1.2 km	MPC · JPL
806047	2016 NZ_{108}	—	July 5, 2016	Mount Lemmon	Mount Lemmon Survey	·	1.5 km	MPC · JPL
806048	2016 NG_{109}	—	July 11, 2016	Haleakala	Pan-STARRS 1	·	1.6 km	MPC · JPL
806049	2016 NV_{109}	—	July 12, 2016	Haleakala	Pan-STARRS 1	DOR	1.8 km	MPC · JPL
806050	2016 NW_{109}	—	July 7, 2016	Haleakala	Pan-STARRS 1	·	1.5 km	MPC · JPL
806051	2016 NA_{110}	—	July 5, 2016	Haleakala	Pan-STARRS 1	EOS	1.2 km	MPC · JPL
806052	2016 NC_{110}	—	July 7, 2016	Haleakala	Pan-STARRS 1	·	1.5 km	MPC · JPL
806053	2016 NL_{110}	—	July 14, 2016	Haleakala	Pan-STARRS 1	·	1.3 km	MPC · JPL
806054	2016 ND_{114}	—	July 5, 2016	Haleakala	Pan-STARRS 1	MAR	830 m	MPC · JPL
806055	2016 NS_{115}	—	July 14, 2016	Haleakala	Pan-STARRS 1	·	1.1 km	MPC · JPL
806056	2016 ND_{116}	—	July 9, 2016	Mount Lemmon	Mount Lemmon Survey	·	1.4 km	MPC · JPL
806057	2016 NX_{118}	—	July 3, 2016	Mount Lemmon	Mount Lemmon Survey	·	2.0 km	MPC · JPL
806058	2016 NZ_{119}	—	July 4, 2016	Haleakala	Pan-STARRS 1	EOS	1.4 km	MPC · JPL
806059	2016 NS_{120}	—	July 11, 2016	Haleakala	Pan-STARRS 1	·	1.2 km	MPC · JPL
806060	2016 NZ_{122}	—	July 14, 2016	Haleakala	Pan-STARRS 1	KOR	950 m	MPC · JPL
806061	2016 NH_{123}	—	July 11, 2016	Haleakala	Pan-STARRS 1	·	1.7 km	MPC · JPL
806062	2016 NP_{124}	—	July 11, 2016	Haleakala	Pan-STARRS 1	·	840 m	MPC · JPL
806063	2016 NX_{124}	—	July 4, 2016	Haleakala	Pan-STARRS 1	·	3.1 km	MPC · JPL
806064	2016 NN_{128}	—	July 12, 2016	Mount Lemmon	Mount Lemmon Survey	NYS	720 m	MPC · JPL
806065	2016 NK_{131}	—	July 11, 2016	Haleakala	Pan-STARRS 1	·	490 m	MPC · JPL
806066	2016 NH_{133}	—	July 10, 2016	Mount Lemmon	Mount Lemmon Survey	·	1.6 km	MPC · JPL
806067	2016 NQ_{141}	—	July 11, 2016	Haleakala	Pan-STARRS 1	·	2.1 km	MPC · JPL
806068	2016 NQ_{142}	—	July 12, 2016	Mount Lemmon	Mount Lemmon Survey	·	2.1 km	MPC · JPL
806069	2016 NW_{142}	—	July 13, 2016	Haleakala	Pan-STARRS 1	EOS	1.3 km	MPC · JPL
806070	2016 NY_{142}	—	July 9, 2016	Haleakala	Pan-STARRS 1	·	2.3 km	MPC · JPL
806071	2016 NK_{143}	—	July 14, 2016	Haleakala	Pan-STARRS 1	·	1.9 km	MPC · JPL
806072	2016 NF_{147}	—	July 4, 2016	Haleakala	Pan-STARRS 1	·	1.3 km	MPC · JPL
806073	2016 NS_{147}	—	July 5, 2016	Haleakala	Pan-STARRS 1	·	1.6 km	MPC · JPL
806074	2016 NV_{147}	—	July 11, 2016	Haleakala	Pan-STARRS 1	·	1.2 km	MPC · JPL
806075	2016 NA_{148}	—	July 13, 2016	Haleakala	Pan-STARRS 1	ELF	2.3 km	MPC · JPL
806076	2016 ND_{148}	—	July 7, 2016	Haleakala	Pan-STARRS 1	EOS	1.3 km	MPC · JPL
806077	2016 NH_{148}	—	July 11, 2016	Haleakala	Pan-STARRS 1	·	1.9 km	MPC · JPL
806078	2016 NN_{148}	—	July 5, 2016	Haleakala	Pan-STARRS 1	·	1.9 km	MPC · JPL
806079	2016 NO_{148}	—	July 4, 2016	Haleakala	Pan-STARRS 1	·	1.3 km	MPC · JPL
806080	2016 NT_{149}	—	July 7, 2016	Mount Lemmon	Mount Lemmon Survey	·	2.2 km	MPC · JPL
806081	2016 NW_{149}	—	July 11, 2016	Haleakala	Pan-STARRS 1	·	1.9 km	MPC · JPL
806082	2016 NB_{150}	—	July 5, 2016	Haleakala	Pan-STARRS 1	·	1.4 km	MPC · JPL
806083	2016 NV_{152}	—	December 3, 2008	Kitt Peak	Spacewatch	·	1.6 km	MPC · JPL
806084	2016 NN_{156}	—	July 14, 2016	Haleakala	Pan-STARRS 1	·	960 m	MPC · JPL
806085	2016 NX_{157}	—	July 11, 2016	Haleakala	Pan-STARRS 1	·	1.7 km	MPC · JPL
806086	2016 NC_{160}	—	July 12, 2016	Mount Lemmon	Mount Lemmon Survey	KOR	860 m	MPC · JPL
806087	2016 NL_{160}	—	July 11, 2016	Haleakala	Pan-STARRS 1	·	1.6 km	MPC · JPL
806088	2016 NL_{161}	—	July 11, 2016	Haleakala	Pan-STARRS 1	EOS	1.5 km	MPC · JPL
806089	2016 NO_{161}	—	July 12, 2016	Mount Lemmon	Mount Lemmon Survey	·	1.7 km	MPC · JPL
806090	2016 NC_{162}	—	July 5, 2016	Haleakala	Pan-STARRS 1	·	2.2 km	MPC · JPL
806091	2016 NV_{164}	—	July 12, 2016	Mount Lemmon	Mount Lemmon Survey	·	1.3 km	MPC · JPL
806092	2016 NL_{165}	—	July 11, 2016	Haleakala	Pan-STARRS 1	·	1.8 km	MPC · JPL
806093	2016 NJ_{166}	—	July 9, 2016	Haleakala	Pan-STARRS 1	·	1.1 km	MPC · JPL
806094	2016 NL_{166}	—	July 11, 2016	Haleakala	Pan-STARRS 1	·	1.9 km	MPC · JPL
806095	2016 NQ_{166}	—	July 5, 2016	Haleakala	Pan-STARRS 1	·	1.5 km	MPC · JPL
806096	2016 NY_{166}	—	February 26, 2014	Haleakala	Pan-STARRS 1	·	2.0 km	MPC · JPL
806097	2016 NV_{167}	—	July 4, 2016	Haleakala	Pan-STARRS 1	MAR	670 m	MPC · JPL
806098	2016 NH_{170}	—	July 14, 2016	Haleakala	Pan-STARRS 1	·	1.1 km	MPC · JPL
806099	2016 NR_{172}	—	July 8, 2016	Haleakala	Pan-STARRS 1	·	2.3 km	MPC · JPL
806100	2016 NB_{174}	—	July 14, 2016	Haleakala	Pan-STARRS 1	·	2.0 km	MPC · JPL

== 806101–806200 ==
back to top

Designation			Discovery			Properties		Ref
Permanent	Provisional	Named after	Date	Site	Discoverer(s)	Category	Diam.	Ref
806101	2016 NF_{175}	—	September 24, 2011	Mount Lemmon	Mount Lemmon Survey	THM	1.6 km	MPC · JPL
806102	2016 NJ_{177}	—	July 12, 2016	Haleakala	Pan-STARRS 1	EOS	1.3 km	MPC · JPL
806103	2016 NH_{179}	—	July 7, 2016	Mount Lemmon	Mount Lemmon Survey	EOS	1.4 km	MPC · JPL
806104	2016 NP_{179}	—	July 9, 2016	Haleakala	Pan-STARRS 1	EOS	1.4 km	MPC · JPL
806105	2016 NN_{192}	—	July 5, 2016	Haleakala	Pan-STARRS 1	·	2.2 km	MPC · JPL
806106	2016 OH_{2}	—	February 19, 2015	Haleakala	Pan-STARRS 1	·	1.2 km	MPC · JPL
806107	2016 OY_{6}	—	August 19, 2012	Siding Spring	SSS	·	1.0 km	MPC · JPL
806108	2016 OJ_{7}	—	September 17, 2012	Catalina	CSS	EUN	1.1 km	MPC · JPL
806109	2016 OG_{8}	—	March 11, 2015	Kitt Peak	Spacewatch	·	1.8 km	MPC · JPL
806110	2016 OC_{12}	—	July 31, 2016	Haleakala	Pan-STARRS 1	EOS	1.3 km	MPC · JPL
806111	2016 OD_{12}	—	July 30, 2016	Haleakala	Pan-STARRS 1	·	620 m	MPC · JPL
806112	2016 ON_{12}	—	July 17, 2016	Haleakala	Pan-STARRS 1	·	1.0 km	MPC · JPL
806113	2016 OB_{13}	—	July 18, 2016	Haleakala	Pan-STARRS 1	JUN	740 m	MPC · JPL
806114	2016 OR_{13}	—	July 28, 2016	Haleakala	Pan-STARRS 1	·	1.4 km	MPC · JPL
806115	2016 OH_{14}	—	July 28, 2016	Haleakala	Pan-STARRS 1	·	1.9 km	MPC · JPL
806116	2016 PU_{6}	—	June 2, 2016	Haleakala	Pan-STARRS 1	·	770 m	MPC · JPL
806117	2016 PT_{9}	—	February 26, 2014	Haleakala	Pan-STARRS 1	·	2.0 km	MPC · JPL
806118	2016 PH_{10}	—	August 2, 2016	Haleakala	Pan-STARRS 1	·	2.2 km	MPC · JPL
806119	2016 PH_{12}	—	September 27, 2003	Socorro	LINEAR	·	570 m	MPC · JPL
806120	2016 PT_{14}	—	September 11, 2004	Kitt Peak	Spacewatch	·	770 m	MPC · JPL
806121	2016 PW_{15}	—	August 7, 2016	Haleakala	Pan-STARRS 1	·	1.2 km	MPC · JPL
806122	2016 PB_{16}	—	August 3, 2016	Cerro Paranal	Gaia Ground Based Optical Tracking	·	2.1 km	MPC · JPL
806123	2016 PZ_{22}	—	August 7, 2016	Haleakala	Pan-STARRS 1	·	2.3 km	MPC · JPL
806124	2016 PO_{24}	—	May 12, 2015	Mount Lemmon	Mount Lemmon Survey	·	1.9 km	MPC · JPL
806125	2016 PF_{26}	—	August 7, 2016	Haleakala	Pan-STARRS 1	·	2.4 km	MPC · JPL
806126	2016 PP_{28}	—	February 17, 2015	Haleakala	Pan-STARRS 1	·	980 m	MPC · JPL
806127	2016 PQ_{28}	—	July 26, 2016	Kitt Peak	Spacewatch	EOS	1.4 km	MPC · JPL
806128	2016 PS_{28}	—	September 18, 2011	Mount Lemmon	Mount Lemmon Survey	·	1.9 km	MPC · JPL
806129	2016 PQ_{29}	—	March 11, 2015	Mount Lemmon	Mount Lemmon Survey	PHO	840 m	MPC · JPL
806130	2016 PG_{30}	—	April 25, 2015	Haleakala	Pan-STARRS 1	·	2.4 km	MPC · JPL
806131	2016 PZ_{31}	—	April 25, 2015	Haleakala	Pan-STARRS 1	·	1.5 km	MPC · JPL
806132	2016 PT_{36}	—	August 7, 2016	Haleakala	Pan-STARRS 1	EOS	1.3 km	MPC · JPL
806133	2016 PU_{41}	—	August 1, 2016	Haleakala	Pan-STARRS 1	·	1.2 km	MPC · JPL
806134	2016 PD_{42}	—	August 7, 2016	Haleakala	Pan-STARRS 1	·	2.2 km	MPC · JPL
806135	2016 PQ_{42}	—	October 6, 2012	Mount Lemmon	Mount Lemmon Survey	·	1.4 km	MPC · JPL
806136	2016 PL_{44}	—	July 5, 2016	Haleakala	Pan-STARRS 1	NAE	1.7 km	MPC · JPL
806137	2016 PN_{45}	—	August 7, 2016	Haleakala	Pan-STARRS 1	·	1.3 km	MPC · JPL
806138	2016 PO_{46}	—	November 27, 2013	Haleakala	Pan-STARRS 1	·	750 m	MPC · JPL
806139	2016 PZ_{47}	—	August 7, 2016	Haleakala	Pan-STARRS 1	EOS	1.3 km	MPC · JPL
806140	2016 PS_{48}	—	August 7, 2016	Haleakala	Pan-STARRS 1	·	2.3 km	MPC · JPL
806141	2016 PV_{49}	—	August 7, 2016	Haleakala	Pan-STARRS 1	·	1.9 km	MPC · JPL
806142	2016 PD_{54}	—	August 7, 2016	Haleakala	Pan-STARRS 1	·	2.3 km	MPC · JPL
806143	2016 PU_{57}	—	August 7, 2016	Haleakala	Pan-STARRS 1	·	2.2 km	MPC · JPL
806144	2016 PF_{58}	—	August 7, 2016	Haleakala	Pan-STARRS 1	EOS	1.1 km	MPC · JPL
806145	2016 PE_{60}	—	August 7, 2016	Haleakala	Pan-STARRS 1	EOS	1.4 km	MPC · JPL
806146	2016 PY_{60}	—	January 12, 2013	Mount Lemmon	Mount Lemmon Survey	EOS	1.3 km	MPC · JPL
806147	2016 PX_{61}	—	August 8, 2016	Haleakala	Pan-STARRS 1	·	660 m	MPC · JPL
806148	2016 PH_{64}	—	August 9, 2016	Haleakala	Pan-STARRS 1	·	2.1 km	MPC · JPL
806149	2016 PR_{65}	—	May 21, 2015	Haleakala	Pan-STARRS 1	·	2.2 km	MPC · JPL
806150	2016 PA_{72}	—	March 21, 2015	Haleakala	Pan-STARRS 1	·	2.0 km	MPC · JPL
806151	2016 PP_{72}	—	May 22, 2015	Haleakala	Pan-STARRS 1	·	2.1 km	MPC · JPL
806152	2016 PL_{75}	—	September 10, 2007	Catalina	CSS	EUN	1.3 km	MPC · JPL
806153	2016 PM_{75}	—	September 13, 2012	Catalina	CSS	·	1.1 km	MPC · JPL
806154	2016 PR_{75}	—	January 24, 2014	Haleakala	Pan-STARRS 1	·	700 m	MPC · JPL
806155	2016 PV_{76}	—	September 3, 2005	Palomar Mountain	NEAT	·	3.5 km	MPC · JPL
806156	2016 PX_{77}	—	August 12, 2016	Haleakala	Pan-STARRS 1	·	570 m	MPC · JPL
806157	2016 PG_{79}	—	August 1, 2016	Haleakala	Pan-STARRS 1	H	340 m	MPC · JPL
806158	2016 PM_{79}	—	August 23, 2011	Haleakala	Pan-STARRS 1	H	320 m	MPC · JPL
806159	2016 PF_{80}	—	August 10, 2016	Haleakala	Pan-STARRS 1	H	440 m	MPC · JPL
806160	2016 PJ_{82}	—	August 2, 2016	Haleakala	Pan-STARRS 1	T_{j} (2.99)	2.2 km	MPC · JPL
806161	2016 PO_{82}	—	July 7, 2016	Haleakala	Pan-STARRS 1	·	1.7 km	MPC · JPL
806162	2016 PV_{83}	—	March 1, 2009	Kitt Peak	Spacewatch	·	1.5 km	MPC · JPL
806163	2016 PY_{84}	—	August 23, 2011	Haleakala	Pan-STARRS 1	·	1.2 km	MPC · JPL
806164	2016 PA_{85}	—	August 3, 2016	Haleakala	Pan-STARRS 1	·	1.2 km	MPC · JPL
806165	2016 PX_{87}	—	August 10, 2016	Haleakala	Pan-STARRS 1	·	2.4 km	MPC · JPL
806166	2016 PQ_{88}	—	August 10, 2016	Haleakala	Pan-STARRS 1	URS	2.3 km	MPC · JPL
806167	2016 PL_{91}	—	August 1, 2016	Haleakala	Pan-STARRS 1	·	1.4 km	MPC · JPL
806168	2016 PO_{91}	—	October 16, 2006	Kitt Peak	Spacewatch	·	2.2 km	MPC · JPL
806169	2016 PB_{92}	—	September 24, 2011	Mount Lemmon	Mount Lemmon Survey	EOS	1.3 km	MPC · JPL
806170	2016 PS_{95}	—	August 3, 2016	Haleakala	Pan-STARRS 1	·	1.9 km	MPC · JPL
806171	2016 PV_{101}	—	August 2, 2016	Haleakala	Pan-STARRS 1	AEO	930 m	MPC · JPL
806172	2016 PF_{102}	—	August 3, 2016	Haleakala	Pan-STARRS 1	EUN	970 m	MPC · JPL
806173	2016 PU_{104}	—	October 24, 2011	Haleakala	Pan-STARRS 1	·	2.3 km	MPC · JPL
806174	2016 PZ_{104}	—	May 21, 2015	Haleakala	Pan-STARRS 1	EOS	1.2 km	MPC · JPL
806175	2016 PO_{105}	—	October 22, 2011	Mount Lemmon	Mount Lemmon Survey	·	2.5 km	MPC · JPL
806176	2016 PF_{107}	—	August 2, 2016	Haleakala	Pan-STARRS 1	·	2.3 km	MPC · JPL
806177	2016 PP_{107}	—	August 2, 2016	Haleakala	Pan-STARRS 1	·	1.9 km	MPC · JPL
806178	2016 PR_{107}	—	May 21, 2015	Haleakala	Pan-STARRS 1	EOS	1.2 km	MPC · JPL
806179	2016 PN_{109}	—	September 26, 2011	Haleakala	Pan-STARRS 1	EMA	1.7 km	MPC · JPL
806180	2016 PL_{110}	—	May 19, 2015	Haleakala	Pan-STARRS 1	TEL	880 m	MPC · JPL
806181	2016 PA_{112}	—	August 30, 2005	Kitt Peak	Spacewatch	EOS	1.5 km	MPC · JPL
806182	2016 PO_{112}	—	September 12, 2005	Kitt Peak	Spacewatch	THM	1.7 km	MPC · JPL
806183	2016 PR_{112}	—	August 2, 2016	Haleakala	Pan-STARRS 1	VER	2.2 km	MPC · JPL
806184	2016 PL_{115}	—	August 3, 2016	Haleakala	Pan-STARRS 1	·	1.1 km	MPC · JPL
806185	2016 PU_{115}	—	October 11, 2012	Haleakala	Pan-STARRS 1	·	1.2 km	MPC · JPL
806186	2016 PO_{116}	—	November 13, 2012	ESA OGS	ESA OGS	KOR	980 m	MPC · JPL
806187	2016 PW_{116}	—	October 24, 2008	Mount Lemmon	Mount Lemmon Survey	·	850 m	MPC · JPL
806188	2016 PC_{119}	—	November 14, 2006	Mount Lemmon	Mount Lemmon Survey	·	1.6 km	MPC · JPL
806189	2016 PE_{126}	—	September 20, 2011	Kitt Peak	Spacewatch	·	1.6 km	MPC · JPL
806190	2016 PD_{127}	—	August 30, 2016	Mount Lemmon	Mount Lemmon Survey	·	1.9 km	MPC · JPL
806191	2016 PV_{127}	—	September 27, 2011	Mount Lemmon	Mount Lemmon Survey	URS	2.4 km	MPC · JPL
806192	2016 PL_{128}	—	August 13, 2016	Haleakala	Pan-STARRS 1	·	2.7 km	MPC · JPL
806193	2016 PA_{129}	—	August 6, 2016	Haleakala	Pan-STARRS 1	·	2.6 km	MPC · JPL
806194	2016 PL_{129}	—	August 7, 2016	Haleakala	Pan-STARRS 1	·	1.8 km	MPC · JPL
806195	2016 PZ_{129}	—	August 10, 2016	Haleakala	Pan-STARRS 1	·	580 m	MPC · JPL
806196	2016 PA_{130}	—	August 9, 2016	Haleakala	Pan-STARRS 1	VER	2.0 km	MPC · JPL
806197	2016 PU_{131}	—	August 7, 2016	Haleakala	Pan-STARRS 1	·	1.7 km	MPC · JPL
806198	2016 PV_{132}	—	August 8, 2016	Haleakala	Pan-STARRS 1	·	1.2 km	MPC · JPL
806199	2016 PX_{132}	—	August 1, 2016	Haleakala	Pan-STARRS 1	·	1.4 km	MPC · JPL
806200	2016 PJ_{135}	—	August 2, 2016	Haleakala	Pan-STARRS 1	·	1.9 km	MPC · JPL

== 806201–806300 ==
back to top

Designation			Discovery			Properties		Ref
Permanent	Provisional	Named after	Date	Site	Discoverer(s)	Category	Diam.	Ref
806201	2016 PC_{141}	—	August 2, 2016	Haleakala	Pan-STARRS 1	LIX	2.3 km	MPC · JPL
806202	2016 PE_{142}	—	August 2, 2016	Haleakala	Pan-STARRS 1	·	710 m	MPC · JPL
806203	2016 PJ_{142}	—	August 2, 2016	Haleakala	Pan-STARRS 1	·	1.5 km	MPC · JPL
806204	2016 PW_{143}	—	August 3, 2016	Haleakala	Pan-STARRS 1	·	2.0 km	MPC · JPL
806205	2016 PL_{144}	—	August 3, 2016	Haleakala	Pan-STARRS 1	EOS	1.4 km	MPC · JPL
806206	2016 PD_{146}	—	August 7, 2016	Haleakala	Pan-STARRS 1	·	2.8 km	MPC · JPL
806207	2016 PP_{146}	—	August 2, 2016	Haleakala	Pan-STARRS 1	·	2.6 km	MPC · JPL
806208	2016 PG_{147}	—	August 8, 2016	Haleakala	Pan-STARRS 1	·	1.4 km	MPC · JPL
806209	2016 PN_{147}	—	August 2, 2016	Haleakala	Pan-STARRS 1	·	1.8 km	MPC · JPL
806210	2016 PX_{147}	—	August 9, 2016	Haleakala	Pan-STARRS 1	·	2.8 km	MPC · JPL
806211	2016 PA_{149}	—	August 1, 2016	Haleakala	Pan-STARRS 1	·	1.9 km	MPC · JPL
806212	2016 PL_{149}	—	August 6, 2016	Haleakala	Pan-STARRS 1	EOS	1.4 km	MPC · JPL
806213	2016 PG_{150}	—	August 8, 2016	Haleakala	Pan-STARRS 1	EOS	1.3 km	MPC · JPL
806214	2016 PV_{150}	—	August 10, 2016	Haleakala	Pan-STARRS 1	·	2.3 km	MPC · JPL
806215	2016 PU_{151}	—	August 7, 2016	Haleakala	Pan-STARRS 1	EOS	1.3 km	MPC · JPL
806216	2016 PK_{152}	—	July 12, 2016	Mount Lemmon	Mount Lemmon Survey	·	1.6 km	MPC · JPL
806217	2016 PB_{154}	—	August 3, 2016	Haleakala	Pan-STARRS 1	·	620 m	MPC · JPL
806218	2016 PC_{154}	—	August 1, 2016	Haleakala	Pan-STARRS 1	·	1.4 km	MPC · JPL
806219	2016 PC_{155}	—	August 7, 2016	Haleakala	Pan-STARRS 1	·	2.2 km	MPC · JPL
806220	2016 PD_{155}	—	August 8, 2016	Haleakala	Pan-STARRS 1	VER	1.9 km	MPC · JPL
806221	2016 PE_{155}	—	August 7, 2016	Haleakala	Pan-STARRS 1	EOS	1.5 km	MPC · JPL
806222	2016 PF_{155}	—	August 13, 2016	Haleakala	Pan-STARRS 1	·	2.0 km	MPC · JPL
806223	2016 PR_{155}	—	August 2, 2016	Haleakala	Pan-STARRS 1	·	1.8 km	MPC · JPL
806224	2016 PZ_{156}	—	August 9, 2016	Haleakala	Pan-STARRS 1	·	2.3 km	MPC · JPL
806225	2016 PE_{157}	—	August 7, 2016	Haleakala	Pan-STARRS 1	·	1.4 km	MPC · JPL
806226	2016 PO_{157}	—	August 2, 2016	Haleakala	Pan-STARRS 1	EOS	1.3 km	MPC · JPL
806227	2016 PP_{157}	—	August 2, 2016	Haleakala	Pan-STARRS 1	·	1.5 km	MPC · JPL
806228	2016 PU_{157}	—	August 3, 2016	Haleakala	Pan-STARRS 1	·	1.3 km	MPC · JPL
806229	2016 PY_{160}	—	August 14, 2016	Haleakala	Pan-STARRS 1	·	2.8 km	MPC · JPL
806230	2016 PG_{161}	—	August 2, 2016	Haleakala	Pan-STARRS 1	·	2.3 km	MPC · JPL
806231	2016 PJ_{161}	—	August 7, 2016	Haleakala	Pan-STARRS 1	·	1.4 km	MPC · JPL
806232	2016 PQ_{161}	—	July 9, 2015	Haleakala	Pan-STARRS 1	·	2.9 km	MPC · JPL
806233	2016 PY_{162}	—	August 2, 2016	Haleakala	Pan-STARRS 1	·	780 m	MPC · JPL
806234	2016 PS_{166}	—	August 2, 2016	Haleakala	Pan-STARRS 1	·	840 m	MPC · JPL
806235	2016 PK_{167}	—	August 10, 2016	Haleakala	Pan-STARRS 1	·	950 m	MPC · JPL
806236	2016 PA_{168}	—	August 14, 2016	Haleakala	Pan-STARRS 1	·	970 m	MPC · JPL
806237	2016 PP_{168}	—	September 28, 2011	Mount Lemmon	Mount Lemmon Survey	·	1.7 km	MPC · JPL
806238	2016 PA_{172}	—	July 11, 2016	Haleakala	Pan-STARRS 1	EOS	1.2 km	MPC · JPL
806239	2016 PM_{173}	—	August 1, 2016	Haleakala	Pan-STARRS 1	·	1.8 km	MPC · JPL
806240	2016 PX_{173}	—	August 1, 2016	Haleakala	Pan-STARRS 1	·	2.6 km	MPC · JPL
806241	2016 PY_{173}	—	August 1, 2016	Haleakala	Pan-STARRS 1	·	1.4 km	MPC · JPL
806242	2016 PD_{174}	—	August 2, 2016	Haleakala	Pan-STARRS 1	EOS	1.3 km	MPC · JPL
806243	2016 PF_{174}	—	August 2, 2016	Haleakala	Pan-STARRS 1	·	1.8 km	MPC · JPL
806244	2016 PN_{174}	—	August 7, 2016	Haleakala	Pan-STARRS 1	·	1.2 km	MPC · JPL
806245	2016 PV_{177}	—	August 2, 2016	Haleakala	Pan-STARRS 1	·	780 m	MPC · JPL
806246	2016 PJ_{180}	—	August 1, 2016	Haleakala	Pan-STARRS 1	EOS	1.1 km	MPC · JPL
806247	2016 PU_{181}	—	August 2, 2016	Haleakala	Pan-STARRS 1	VER	2.0 km	MPC · JPL
806248	2016 PW_{181}	—	August 3, 2016	Haleakala	Pan-STARRS 1	critical	770 m	MPC · JPL
806249	2016 PF_{185}	—	August 2, 2016	Haleakala	Pan-STARRS 1	·	1.9 km	MPC · JPL
806250	2016 PC_{188}	—	August 2, 2016	Haleakala	Pan-STARRS 1	·	680 m	MPC · JPL
806251	2016 PE_{189}	—	August 7, 2016	Haleakala	Pan-STARRS 1	EOS	1.2 km	MPC · JPL
806252	2016 PJ_{189}	—	August 9, 2016	Haleakala	Pan-STARRS 1	·	1.2 km	MPC · JPL
806253	2016 PO_{189}	—	August 7, 2016	Haleakala	Pan-STARRS 1	·	1.7 km	MPC · JPL
806254	2016 PT_{189}	—	August 2, 2016	Haleakala	Pan-STARRS 1	·	2.4 km	MPC · JPL
806255	2016 PE_{190}	—	August 2, 2016	Haleakala	Pan-STARRS 1	HYG	2.1 km	MPC · JPL
806256	2016 PV_{190}	—	August 2, 2016	Haleakala	Pan-STARRS 1	·	1.1 km	MPC · JPL
806257	2016 PA_{191}	—	August 2, 2016	Haleakala	Pan-STARRS 1	·	1.2 km	MPC · JPL
806258	2016 PH_{194}	—	August 1, 2016	Haleakala	Pan-STARRS 1	·	3.1 km	MPC · JPL
806259	2016 PA_{195}	—	August 8, 2016	Haleakala	Pan-STARRS 1	·	2.0 km	MPC · JPL
806260	2016 PS_{196}	—	August 14, 2016	Haleakala	Pan-STARRS 1	·	1.0 km	MPC · JPL
806261	2016 PF_{197}	—	August 3, 2016	Haleakala	Pan-STARRS 1	·	430 m	MPC · JPL
806262	2016 PR_{201}	—	August 11, 2016	Haleakala	Pan-STARRS 1	·	750 m	MPC · JPL
806263	2016 PZ_{203}	—	August 3, 2016	Haleakala	Pan-STARRS 1	KOR	1.1 km	MPC · JPL
806264	2016 PM_{204}	—	August 3, 2016	Haleakala	Pan-STARRS 1	·	2.1 km	MPC · JPL
806265	2016 PF_{205}	—	August 1, 2016	Haleakala	Pan-STARRS 1	·	1.6 km	MPC · JPL
806266	2016 PM_{205}	—	August 9, 2016	Haleakala	Pan-STARRS 1	·	1.6 km	MPC · JPL
806267	2016 PO_{207}	—	August 1, 2016	Haleakala	Pan-STARRS 1	T_{j} (2.99)	2.1 km	MPC · JPL
806268	2016 PU_{207}	—	August 3, 2016	Haleakala	Pan-STARRS 1	·	2.0 km	MPC · JPL
806269	2016 PZ_{207}	—	August 8, 2016	Haleakala	Pan-STARRS 1	(16286)	1.3 km	MPC · JPL
806270	2016 PA_{208}	—	August 7, 2016	Haleakala	Pan-STARRS 1	·	2.1 km	MPC · JPL
806271	2016 PD_{208}	—	August 10, 2016	Haleakala	Pan-STARRS 1	·	2.5 km	MPC · JPL
806272	2016 PJ_{208}	—	August 10, 2016	Haleakala	Pan-STARRS 1	URS	2.2 km	MPC · JPL
806273	2016 PK_{208}	—	August 14, 2016	Haleakala	Pan-STARRS 1	·	2.1 km	MPC · JPL
806274	2016 PB_{209}	—	August 1, 2016	Haleakala	Pan-STARRS 1	·	1.4 km	MPC · JPL
806275	2016 PX_{209}	—	July 14, 2016	Haleakala	Pan-STARRS 1	·	1.2 km	MPC · JPL
806276	2016 PY_{209}	—	July 11, 2016	Haleakala	Pan-STARRS 1	·	1.7 km	MPC · JPL
806277	2016 PE_{211}	—	August 8, 2016	Haleakala	Pan-STARRS 1	·	1.3 km	MPC · JPL
806278	2016 PU_{211}	—	August 14, 2016	Haleakala	Pan-STARRS 1	·	2.1 km	MPC · JPL
806279	2016 PB_{212}	—	August 2, 2016	Haleakala	Pan-STARRS 1	·	1.4 km	MPC · JPL
806280	2016 PE_{212}	—	August 10, 2016	Haleakala	Pan-STARRS 1	·	1.9 km	MPC · JPL
806281	2016 PA_{213}	—	August 2, 2016	Haleakala	Pan-STARRS 1	·	1.2 km	MPC · JPL
806282	2016 PF_{213}	—	August 8, 2016	Haleakala	Pan-STARRS 1	·	1.2 km	MPC · JPL
806283	2016 PA_{214}	—	August 1, 2016	Haleakala	Pan-STARRS 1	·	1.1 km	MPC · JPL
806284	2016 PN_{214}	—	August 2, 2016	Haleakala	Pan-STARRS 1	·	1.6 km	MPC · JPL
806285	2016 PF_{218}	—	August 2, 2016	Haleakala	Pan-STARRS 1	·	1.8 km	MPC · JPL
806286	2016 PH_{220}	—	August 7, 2016	Haleakala	Pan-STARRS 1	EOS	1.4 km	MPC · JPL
806287	2016 PV_{222}	—	August 11, 2016	Haleakala	Pan-STARRS 1	·	1.3 km	MPC · JPL
806288	2016 PW_{222}	—	August 1, 2016	Haleakala	Pan-STARRS 1	·	1.2 km	MPC · JPL
806289	2016 PR_{225}	—	August 8, 2016	Haleakala	Pan-STARRS 1	KOR	920 m	MPC · JPL
806290	2016 PT_{225}	—	August 7, 2016	Haleakala	Pan-STARRS 1	·	1.1 km	MPC · JPL
806291	2016 PP_{227}	—	August 8, 2016	Haleakala	Pan-STARRS 1	HOF	1.8 km	MPC · JPL
806292	2016 PJ_{229}	—	August 2, 2016	Haleakala	Pan-STARRS 1	·	1.1 km	MPC · JPL
806293	2016 PC_{230}	—	August 2, 2016	Haleakala	Pan-STARRS 1	·	1.2 km	MPC · JPL
806294	2016 PA_{231}	—	August 2, 2016	Haleakala	Pan-STARRS 1	·	2.6 km	MPC · JPL
806295	2016 PF_{237}	—	August 1, 2016	Haleakala	Pan-STARRS 1	·	2.0 km	MPC · JPL
806296	2016 PO_{237}	—	September 30, 2005	Mount Lemmon	Mount Lemmon Survey	PHO	870 m	MPC · JPL
806297	2016 PK_{239}	—	August 9, 2016	Haleakala	Pan-STARRS 1	·	2.0 km	MPC · JPL
806298	2016 PS_{239}	—	March 22, 2015	Haleakala	Pan-STARRS 1	·	1.6 km	MPC · JPL
806299	2016 PZ_{239}	—	August 7, 2016	Haleakala	Pan-STARRS 1	EOS	1.1 km	MPC · JPL
806300	2016 PR_{241}	—	June 11, 2015	Haleakala	Pan-STARRS 1	·	1.3 km	MPC · JPL

== 806301–806400 ==
back to top

Designation			Discovery			Properties		Ref
Permanent	Provisional	Named after	Date	Site	Discoverer(s)	Category	Diam.	Ref
806301	2016 PX_{245}	—	August 11, 2016	Haleakala	Pan-STARRS 1	·	2.0 km	MPC · JPL
806302	2016 PH_{246}	—	August 2, 2016	Haleakala	Pan-STARRS 1	·	1.8 km	MPC · JPL
806303	2016 PO_{249}	—	August 10, 2010	Kitt Peak	Spacewatch	·	2.2 km	MPC · JPL
806304	2016 PY_{251}	—	August 8, 2016	Haleakala	Pan-STARRS 1	·	1.1 km	MPC · JPL
806305	2016 PY_{253}	—	August 8, 2016	Haleakala	Pan-STARRS 1	KOR	1.1 km	MPC · JPL
806306	2016 PN_{256}	—	August 3, 2016	Haleakala	Pan-STARRS 1	EOS	1.3 km	MPC · JPL
806307	2016 PZ_{256}	—	August 8, 2016	Haleakala	Pan-STARRS 1	·	2.5 km	MPC · JPL
806308	2016 PL_{257}	—	August 7, 2016	Haleakala	Pan-STARRS 1	·	2.5 km	MPC · JPL
806309	2016 PA_{258}	—	August 2, 2016	Haleakala	Pan-STARRS 1	VER	2.0 km	MPC · JPL
806310	2016 PM_{258}	—	August 8, 2016	Haleakala	Pan-STARRS 1	EOS	1.3 km	MPC · JPL
806311	2016 PK_{259}	—	August 7, 2016	Haleakala	Pan-STARRS 1	·	1.7 km	MPC · JPL
806312	2016 PW_{259}	—	August 3, 2016	Haleakala	Pan-STARRS 1	·	2.0 km	MPC · JPL
806313	2016 PR_{260}	—	December 31, 2007	Kitt Peak	Spacewatch	EOS	1.4 km	MPC · JPL
806314	2016 PW_{260}	—	August 7, 2016	Haleakala	Pan-STARRS 1	·	2.3 km	MPC · JPL
806315	2016 PZ_{260}	—	August 8, 2016	Haleakala	Pan-STARRS 1	EOS	1.5 km	MPC · JPL
806316	2016 PK_{261}	—	August 2, 2016	Haleakala	Pan-STARRS 1	·	2.8 km	MPC · JPL
806317	2016 PP_{261}	—	August 8, 2016	Haleakala	Pan-STARRS 1	·	2.2 km	MPC · JPL
806318	2016 PA_{262}	—	August 10, 2016	Haleakala	Pan-STARRS 1	·	1.9 km	MPC · JPL
806319	2016 PH_{262}	—	August 2, 2016	Haleakala	Pan-STARRS 1	·	1.9 km	MPC · JPL
806320	2016 PL_{262}	—	August 2, 2016	Haleakala	Pan-STARRS 1	·	2.3 km	MPC · JPL
806321	2016 PQ_{262}	—	August 14, 2016	Haleakala	Pan-STARRS 1	·	2.3 km	MPC · JPL
806322	2016 PR_{262}	—	August 2, 2016	Haleakala	Pan-STARRS 1	·	1.8 km	MPC · JPL
806323	2016 PY_{262}	—	October 23, 2011	Mount Lemmon	Mount Lemmon Survey	·	1.9 km	MPC · JPL
806324	2016 PZ_{262}	—	August 6, 2016	Haleakala	Pan-STARRS 1	·	2.2 km	MPC · JPL
806325	2016 PA_{263}	—	August 7, 2016	Haleakala	Pan-STARRS 1	EOS	1.2 km	MPC · JPL
806326	2016 PH_{264}	—	August 2, 2016	Haleakala	Pan-STARRS 1	EOS	1.4 km	MPC · JPL
806327	2016 PP_{264}	—	August 8, 2016	Haleakala	Pan-STARRS 1	·	2.1 km	MPC · JPL
806328	2016 PS_{264}	—	August 2, 2016	Haleakala	Pan-STARRS 1	EOS	1.3 km	MPC · JPL
806329	2016 PJ_{266}	—	August 1, 2016	Haleakala	Pan-STARRS 1	·	2.1 km	MPC · JPL
806330	2016 PX_{266}	—	August 2, 2016	Haleakala	Pan-STARRS 1	·	1.7 km	MPC · JPL
806331	2016 PM_{268}	—	August 1, 2016	Haleakala	Pan-STARRS 1	·	1.5 km	MPC · JPL
806332	2016 PT_{268}	—	August 9, 2016	Haleakala	Pan-STARRS 1	·	2.1 km	MPC · JPL
806333	2016 PT_{271}	—	September 23, 2011	Haleakala	Pan-STARRS 1	·	1.8 km	MPC · JPL
806334	2016 PS_{272}	—	August 7, 2016	Haleakala	Pan-STARRS 1	EOS	1.2 km	MPC · JPL
806335	2016 PZ_{291}	—	October 28, 2008	Kitt Peak	Spacewatch	·	1.1 km	MPC · JPL
806336	2016 PK_{292}	—	August 1, 2016	Haleakala	Pan-STARRS 1	·	2.1 km	MPC · JPL
806337	2016 PF_{313}	—	August 3, 2016	Haleakala	Pan-STARRS 1	·	2.0 km	MPC · JPL
806338	2016 PT_{313}	—	August 10, 2016	Haleakala	Pan-STARRS 1	·	2.0 km	MPC · JPL
806339	2016 QT_{7}	—	August 14, 2012	Haleakala	Pan-STARRS 1	·	820 m	MPC · JPL
806340	2016 QK_{11}	—	July 5, 2016	Haleakala	Pan-STARRS 1	H	350 m	MPC · JPL
806341	2016 QU_{12}	—	August 31, 2011	Haleakala	Pan-STARRS 1	H	300 m	MPC · JPL
806342	2016 QF_{29}	—	July 9, 2016	Haleakala	Pan-STARRS 1	H	350 m	MPC · JPL
806343	2016 QK_{30}	—	July 9, 2015	Haleakala	Pan-STARRS 1	·	2.2 km	MPC · JPL
806344	2016 QS_{30}	—	August 27, 2016	Haleakala	Pan-STARRS 1	VER	2.1 km	MPC · JPL
806345	2016 QE_{31}	—	August 27, 2016	Haleakala	Pan-STARRS 1	EOS	1.2 km	MPC · JPL
806346	2016 QP_{32}	—	July 11, 2016	Haleakala	Pan-STARRS 1	·	1.4 km	MPC · JPL
806347	2016 QJ_{34}	—	August 3, 2016	Haleakala	Pan-STARRS 1	·	1.5 km	MPC · JPL
806348	2016 QW_{39}	—	December 16, 2009	Kitt Peak	Spacewatch	·	890 m	MPC · JPL
806349	2016 QK_{41}	—	October 22, 2012	Haleakala	Pan-STARRS 1	·	1.2 km	MPC · JPL
806350	2016 QZ_{45}	—	August 26, 2016	Wildberg	R. Apitzsch	·	1.8 km	MPC · JPL
806351	2016 QM_{47}	—	July 11, 2016	Haleakala	Pan-STARRS 1	PHO	790 m	MPC · JPL
806352	2016 QV_{47}	—	January 18, 2013	Haleakala	Pan-STARRS 1	TIR	2.3 km	MPC · JPL
806353	2016 QC_{49}	—	August 27, 2016	Haleakala	Pan-STARRS 1	VER	2.0 km	MPC · JPL
806354	2016 QG_{49}	—	August 27, 2016	Haleakala	Pan-STARRS 1	(2076)	560 m	MPC · JPL
806355	2016 QP_{50}	—	September 20, 2011	Mount Lemmon	Mount Lemmon Survey	EOS	1.5 km	MPC · JPL
806356	2016 QF_{56}	—	July 11, 2016	Haleakala	Pan-STARRS 1	·	1.5 km	MPC · JPL
806357	2016 QP_{56}	—	July 11, 2016	Haleakala	Pan-STARRS 1	·	1.9 km	MPC · JPL
806358	2016 QG_{60}	—	April 25, 2015	Haleakala	Pan-STARRS 1	·	1.2 km	MPC · JPL
806359	2016 QE_{61}	—	March 30, 2015	Haleakala	Pan-STARRS 1	·	1.4 km	MPC · JPL
806360	2016 QX_{63}	—	August 3, 2016	Haleakala	Pan-STARRS 1	·	2.0 km	MPC · JPL
806361	2016 QX_{64}	—	September 30, 2011	Kitt Peak	Spacewatch	·	1.9 km	MPC · JPL
806362	2016 QO_{68}	—	April 12, 2011	Mount Lemmon	Mount Lemmon Survey	·	1.1 km	MPC · JPL
806363	2016 QV_{69}	—	September 23, 2011	Kitt Peak	Spacewatch	·	1.3 km	MPC · JPL
806364	2016 QE_{72}	—	August 3, 2016	Haleakala	Pan-STARRS 1	EOS	1.5 km	MPC · JPL
806365	2016 QK_{72}	—	November 3, 2005	Mount Lemmon	Mount Lemmon Survey	·	790 m	MPC · JPL
806366	2016 QQ_{74}	—	August 29, 2016	Mount Lemmon	Mount Lemmon Survey	EOS	1.5 km	MPC · JPL
806367	2016 QH_{85}	—	August 30, 2016	Kitt Peak	Spacewatch	T_{j} (2.98)	1.8 km	MPC · JPL
806368	2016 QO_{85}	—	January 14, 2011	Catalina	CSS	PHO	800 m	MPC · JPL
806369	2016 QF_{87}	—	October 27, 2005	Kitt Peak	Spacewatch	·	2.2 km	MPC · JPL
806370	2016 QC_{89}	—	August 28, 2016	Mount Lemmon	Mount Lemmon Survey	·	2.4 km	MPC · JPL
806371	2016 QW_{89}	—	August 27, 2016	Haleakala	Pan-STARRS 1	·	1.8 km	MPC · JPL
806372	2016 QU_{91}	—	June 18, 2015	Mount Lemmon	Mount Lemmon Survey	·	2.5 km	MPC · JPL
806373	2016 QB_{92}	—	June 26, 2015	Haleakala	Pan-STARRS 1	·	1.6 km	MPC · JPL
806374	2016 QZ_{92}	—	October 18, 2011	Kitt Peak	Spacewatch	·	1.4 km	MPC · JPL
806375	2016 QV_{93}	—	October 27, 2011	Mount Lemmon	Mount Lemmon Survey	·	2.1 km	MPC · JPL
806376	2016 QC_{94}	—	October 23, 2011	Haleakala	Pan-STARRS 1	(8737)	2.2 km	MPC · JPL
806377	2016 QE_{94}	—	August 30, 2016	Haleakala	Pan-STARRS 1	·	2.2 km	MPC · JPL
806378	2016 QL_{94}	—	August 30, 2016	Haleakala	Pan-STARRS 1	EOS	1.2 km	MPC · JPL
806379	2016 QO_{94}	—	October 26, 2011	Haleakala	Pan-STARRS 1	·	2.1 km	MPC · JPL
806380	2016 QX_{98}	—	August 26, 2016	Mount Lemmon	Mount Lemmon Survey	·	2.1 km	MPC · JPL
806381	2016 QE_{100}	—	August 27, 2016	Haleakala	Pan-STARRS 1	H	310 m	MPC · JPL
806382	2016 QD_{101}	—	August 28, 2016	Mount Lemmon	Mount Lemmon Survey	LUT	2.8 km	MPC · JPL
806383	2016 QG_{101}	—	August 29, 2016	Mount Lemmon	Mount Lemmon Survey	EOS	1.3 km	MPC · JPL
806384	2016 QD_{102}	—	August 28, 2016	Mount Lemmon	Mount Lemmon Survey	BAP	640 m	MPC · JPL
806385	2016 QD_{103}	—	August 16, 2016	Haleakala	Pan-STARRS 1	·	540 m	MPC · JPL
806386	2016 QF_{105}	—	August 30, 2016	Haleakala	Pan-STARRS 1	EOS	1.3 km	MPC · JPL
806387	2016 QD_{106}	—	August 29, 2016	Mount Lemmon	Mount Lemmon Survey	·	2.7 km	MPC · JPL
806388	2016 QA_{107}	—	August 27, 2016	Haleakala	Pan-STARRS 1	·	2.0 km	MPC · JPL
806389	2016 QL_{107}	—	August 27, 2016	Haleakala	Pan-STARRS 1	·	1.1 km	MPC · JPL
806390	2016 QQ_{107}	—	August 26, 2016	Haleakala	Pan-STARRS 1	·	1.1 km	MPC · JPL
806391	2016 QK_{111}	—	August 24, 2016	Kitt Peak	Spacewatch	·	1.6 km	MPC · JPL
806392	2016 QG_{112}	—	August 30, 2016	Haleakala	Pan-STARRS 1	·	2.1 km	MPC · JPL
806393	2016 QP_{112}	—	August 30, 2016	Haleakala	Pan-STARRS 1	·	1.9 km	MPC · JPL
806394	2016 QM_{113}	—	August 28, 2016	Mount Lemmon	Mount Lemmon Survey	·	2.3 km	MPC · JPL
806395	2016 QU_{113}	—	August 31, 2016	Mount Lemmon	Mount Lemmon Survey	WIT	640 m	MPC · JPL
806396	2016 QY_{115}	—	August 30, 2016	Haleakala	Pan-STARRS 1	MAR	620 m	MPC · JPL
806397	2016 QW_{116}	—	August 27, 2016	Haleakala	Pan-STARRS 1	·	1.2 km	MPC · JPL
806398	2016 QR_{120}	—	August 29, 2016	Mount Lemmon	Mount Lemmon Survey	·	1.1 km	MPC · JPL
806399	2016 QE_{121}	—	August 30, 2016	Haleakala	Pan-STARRS 1	·	1.4 km	MPC · JPL
806400	2016 QH_{121}	—	August 30, 2016	Haleakala	Pan-STARRS 1	·	2.2 km	MPC · JPL

== 806401–806500 ==
back to top

Designation			Discovery			Properties		Ref
Permanent	Provisional	Named after	Date	Site	Discoverer(s)	Category	Diam.	Ref
806401	2016 QU_{121}	—	August 27, 2016	Haleakala	Pan-STARRS 1	·	2.4 km	MPC · JPL
806402	2016 QG_{125}	—	August 29, 2016	XuYi	PMO NEO Survey Program	·	2.4 km	MPC · JPL
806403	2016 QD_{126}	—	August 30, 2016	Haleakala	Pan-STARRS 1	·	2.1 km	MPC · JPL
806404	2016 QK_{127}	—	August 29, 2016	Mount Lemmon	Mount Lemmon Survey	·	1.6 km	MPC · JPL
806405	2016 QQ_{127}	—	August 26, 2016	Haleakala	Pan-STARRS 1	·	1.9 km	MPC · JPL
806406	2016 QY_{127}	—	August 26, 2016	Haleakala	Pan-STARRS 1	·	2.5 km	MPC · JPL
806407	2016 QD_{128}	—	August 30, 2016	Haleakala	Pan-STARRS 1	NAE	2.0 km	MPC · JPL
806408	2016 QQ_{128}	—	August 27, 2016	Haleakala	Pan-STARRS 1	·	1.7 km	MPC · JPL
806409	2016 QD_{129}	—	August 27, 2016	Haleakala	Pan-STARRS 1	·	2.1 km	MPC · JPL
806410	2016 QJ_{129}	—	August 27, 2016	Haleakala	Pan-STARRS 1	·	1.9 km	MPC · JPL
806411	2016 QQ_{129}	—	August 28, 2016	Mount Lemmon	Mount Lemmon Survey	·	1.5 km	MPC · JPL
806412	2016 QV_{129}	—	August 30, 2016	Haleakala	Pan-STARRS 1	·	2.5 km	MPC · JPL
806413	2016 QW_{129}	—	August 28, 2016	Mount Lemmon	Mount Lemmon Survey	·	1.8 km	MPC · JPL
806414	2016 QD_{130}	—	August 30, 2016	Mount Lemmon	Mount Lemmon Survey	EOS	1.2 km	MPC · JPL
806415	2016 QO_{130}	—	August 30, 2016	Haleakala	Pan-STARRS 1	·	2.2 km	MPC · JPL
806416	2016 QA_{131}	—	October 19, 2011	Kitt Peak	Spacewatch	·	2.0 km	MPC · JPL
806417	2016 QE_{131}	—	August 30, 2016	Haleakala	Pan-STARRS 1	·	1.9 km	MPC · JPL
806418	2016 QM_{131}	—	August 26, 2016	Haleakala	Pan-STARRS 1	·	910 m	MPC · JPL
806419	2016 QW_{133}	—	May 18, 2015	Haleakala	Pan-STARRS 1	·	1.5 km	MPC · JPL
806420	2016 QD_{134}	—	August 30, 2016	Mount Lemmon	Mount Lemmon Survey	·	1.7 km	MPC · JPL
806421	2016 QQ_{134}	—	August 30, 2016	Haleakala	Pan-STARRS 1	·	2.5 km	MPC · JPL
806422	2016 QN_{139}	—	August 29, 2016	Mount Lemmon	Mount Lemmon Survey	·	2.4 km	MPC · JPL
806423	2016 QG_{142}	—	August 29, 2016	Mount Lemmon	Mount Lemmon Survey	·	2.0 km	MPC · JPL
806424	2016 QB_{143}	—	August 28, 2016	Mount Lemmon	Mount Lemmon Survey	MAR	630 m	MPC · JPL
806425	2016 QO_{144}	—	August 29, 2016	Mount Lemmon	Mount Lemmon Survey	·	2.4 km	MPC · JPL
806426	2016 QR_{144}	—	August 30, 2016	Haleakala	Pan-STARRS 1	EOS	1.3 km	MPC · JPL
806427	2016 QZ_{144}	—	August 28, 2016	Mount Lemmon	Mount Lemmon Survey	·	2.3 km	MPC · JPL
806428	2016 QA_{145}	—	August 28, 2016	Mount Lemmon	Mount Lemmon Survey	·	2.3 km	MPC · JPL
806429	2016 QQ_{147}	—	August 30, 2016	Haleakala	Pan-STARRS 1	·	2.0 km	MPC · JPL
806430	2016 QB_{148}	—	August 30, 2016	Mount Lemmon	Mount Lemmon Survey	·	2.5 km	MPC · JPL
806431	2016 QP_{149}	—	October 1, 2005	Mount Lemmon	Mount Lemmon Survey	URS	1.8 km	MPC · JPL
806432	2016 QV_{149}	—	August 27, 2016	Haleakala	Pan-STARRS 1	·	2.1 km	MPC · JPL
806433	2016 QJ_{150}	—	August 28, 2016	Mount Lemmon	Mount Lemmon Survey	·	2.0 km	MPC · JPL
806434	2016 QF_{156}	—	April 23, 2014	Mount Lemmon	Mount Lemmon Survey	·	2.4 km	MPC · JPL
806435	2016 RX_{9}	—	February 12, 2011	Mount Lemmon	Mount Lemmon Survey	PHO	700 m	MPC · JPL
806436	2016 RE_{11}	—	August 27, 2006	Kitt Peak	Spacewatch	·	1.1 km	MPC · JPL
806437	2016 RS_{11}	—	June 2, 2016	Mount Lemmon	Mount Lemmon Survey	·	2.4 km	MPC · JPL
806438	2016 RC_{15}	—	August 29, 2016	Mount Lemmon	Mount Lemmon Survey	MAR	760 m	MPC · JPL
806439	2016 RN_{18}	—	August 7, 2016	Haleakala	Pan-STARRS 1	H	330 m	MPC · JPL
806440	2016 RP_{19}	—	October 27, 2008	Siding Spring	SSS	·	850 m	MPC · JPL
806441	2016 RZ_{20}	—	September 30, 2009	Mount Lemmon	Mount Lemmon Survey	·	860 m	MPC · JPL
806442	2016 RC_{21}	—	September 3, 2016	Wildberg	R. Apitzsch	·	1.2 km	MPC · JPL
806443	2016 RW_{24}	—	December 29, 2003	Kitt Peak	Spacewatch	·	1.6 km	MPC · JPL
806444	2016 RX_{25}	—	August 3, 2016	Haleakala	Pan-STARRS 1	·	900 m	MPC · JPL
806445	2016 RW_{31}	—	February 26, 2014	Haleakala	Pan-STARRS 1	·	1.8 km	MPC · JPL
806446	2016 RM_{33}	—	September 20, 2009	Mount Lemmon	Mount Lemmon Survey	MAS	590 m	MPC · JPL
806447	2016 RX_{34}	—	August 14, 2016	Haleakala	Pan-STARRS 1	·	2.3 km	MPC · JPL
806448	2016 RB_{40}	—	August 11, 2012	Mayhill-ISON	L. Elenin	·	1.1 km	MPC · JPL
806449	2016 RK_{41}	—	September 12, 2016	Haleakala	Pan-STARRS 1	·	390 m	MPC · JPL
806450	2016 RA_{48}	—	September 6, 2016	Mount Lemmon	Mount Lemmon Survey	·	1.4 km	MPC · JPL
806451	2016 RH_{48}	—	September 8, 2016	Haleakala	Pan-STARRS 1	·	1.5 km	MPC · JPL
806452	2016 RG_{49}	—	September 12, 2016	Haleakala	Pan-STARRS 1	·	1.8 km	MPC · JPL
806453	2016 RF_{50}	—	October 24, 2011	Haleakala	Pan-STARRS 1	·	1.9 km	MPC · JPL
806454	2016 RP_{50}	—	September 10, 2016	Mount Lemmon	Mount Lemmon Survey	T_{j} (2.99) · EUP	2.2 km	MPC · JPL
806455	2016 RN_{52}	—	September 6, 2016	Mount Lemmon	Mount Lemmon Survey	·	1.1 km	MPC · JPL
806456	2016 RF_{59}	—	September 6, 2016	Haleakala	Pan-STARRS 1	·	1.5 km	MPC · JPL
806457	2016 RA_{60}	—	September 10, 2016	Mount Lemmon	Mount Lemmon Survey	·	1.1 km	MPC · JPL
806458	2016 RP_{60}	—	September 10, 2016	Mount Lemmon	Mount Lemmon Survey	·	1.5 km	MPC · JPL
806459	2016 RG_{61}	—	September 8, 2016	Haleakala	Pan-STARRS 1	·	2.2 km	MPC · JPL
806460	2016 RL_{61}	—	September 8, 2016	Haleakala	Pan-STARRS 1	EOS	1.4 km	MPC · JPL
806461	2016 RE_{62}	—	September 8, 2016	Haleakala	Pan-STARRS 1	EOS	1.3 km	MPC · JPL
806462	2016 RJ_{62}	—	September 12, 2016	Haleakala	Pan-STARRS 1	·	1.9 km	MPC · JPL
806463	2016 RP_{65}	—	September 12, 2016	Haleakala	Pan-STARRS 1	EOS	1.1 km	MPC · JPL
806464	2016 RJ_{67}	—	September 10, 2016	Mount Lemmon	Mount Lemmon Survey	·	650 m	MPC · JPL
806465	2016 RG_{68}	—	September 6, 2016	Mount Lemmon	Mount Lemmon Survey	EUN	820 m	MPC · JPL
806466	2016 RY_{72}	—	September 12, 2016	Haleakala	Pan-STARRS 1	VER	1.7 km	MPC · JPL
806467	2016 RM_{73}	—	September 12, 2016	Mount Lemmon	Mount Lemmon Survey	·	2.2 km	MPC · JPL
806468	2016 RO_{74}	—	September 5, 2016	Mount Lemmon	Mount Lemmon Survey	·	2.0 km	MPC · JPL
806469	2016 RD_{75}	—	September 6, 2016	Haleakala	Pan-STARRS 1	PHO	750 m	MPC · JPL
806470	2016 RW_{76}	—	August 24, 2008	Kitt Peak	Spacewatch	3:2	3.3 km	MPC · JPL
806471	2016 RD_{77}	—	September 8, 2016	Haleakala	Pan-STARRS 1	·	2.4 km	MPC · JPL
806472	2016 RF_{79}	—	September 12, 2016	Haleakala	Pan-STARRS 1	·	2.3 km	MPC · JPL
806473	2016 RO_{79}	—	September 6, 2016	Mount Lemmon	Mount Lemmon Survey	·	1.3 km	MPC · JPL
806474	2016 RF_{80}	—	September 10, 2016	Mount Lemmon	Mount Lemmon Survey	EOS	1.3 km	MPC · JPL
806475	2016 RO_{80}	—	September 10, 2016	Kitt Peak	Spacewatch	·	2.3 km	MPC · JPL
806476	2016 RF_{81}	—	September 12, 2016	Haleakala	Pan-STARRS 1	EOS	1.5 km	MPC · JPL
806477	2016 RG_{81}	—	September 6, 2016	Mount Lemmon	Mount Lemmon Survey	·	1.2 km	MPC · JPL
806478	2016 RP_{81}	—	September 10, 2016	Mount Lemmon	Mount Lemmon Survey	·	1.3 km	MPC · JPL
806479	2016 RT_{81}	—	September 2, 2016	Mount Lemmon	Mount Lemmon Survey	·	1.7 km	MPC · JPL
806480	2016 RC_{84}	—	September 8, 2016	Haleakala	Pan-STARRS 1	EOS	1.3 km	MPC · JPL
806481	2016 RB_{85}	—	September 12, 2016	Haleakala	Pan-STARRS 1	·	1.4 km	MPC · JPL
806482	2016 RF_{85}	—	September 12, 2016	Haleakala	Pan-STARRS 1	EOS	1.2 km	MPC · JPL
806483	2016 RY_{85}	—	September 9, 2016	Mount Lemmon	Mount Lemmon Survey	·	1.4 km	MPC · JPL
806484	2016 RC_{86}	—	September 12, 2016	Haleakala	Pan-STARRS 1	·	1.7 km	MPC · JPL
806485	2016 RZ_{87}	—	September 8, 2016	Haleakala	Pan-STARRS 1	·	950 m	MPC · JPL
806486	2016 RE_{88}	—	September 6, 2016	Mount Lemmon	Mount Lemmon Survey	·	1.7 km	MPC · JPL
806487	2016 RQ_{89}	—	April 4, 2014	Mount Lemmon	Mount Lemmon Survey	·	1.8 km	MPC · JPL
806488	2016 RS_{89}	—	September 8, 2016	Haleakala	Pan-STARRS 1	EOS	1.3 km	MPC · JPL
806489	2016 RP_{90}	—	September 2, 2016	Mount Lemmon	Mount Lemmon Survey	·	2.0 km	MPC · JPL
806490	2016 RC_{92}	—	September 8, 2016	Haleakala	Pan-STARRS 1	·	3.0 km	MPC · JPL
806491	2016 RK_{92}	—	September 11, 2016	Mount Lemmon	Mount Lemmon Survey	·	2.4 km	MPC · JPL
806492	2016 RS_{92}	—	August 28, 2016	Mount Lemmon	Mount Lemmon Survey	·	2.1 km	MPC · JPL
806493	2016 RE_{93}	—	September 10, 2016	Mount Lemmon	Mount Lemmon Survey	·	2.0 km	MPC · JPL
806494	2016 RB_{94}	—	September 12, 2016	Haleakala	Pan-STARRS 1	EOS	1.3 km	MPC · JPL
806495	2016 RF_{94}	—	January 7, 2002	Kitt Peak	Spacewatch	EOS	1.4 km	MPC · JPL
806496	2016 RH_{95}	—	September 12, 2016	Haleakala	Pan-STARRS 1	VER	1.8 km	MPC · JPL
806497	2016 SZ_{15}	—	April 25, 2015	Haleakala	Pan-STARRS 1	·	1.8 km	MPC · JPL
806498	2016 SC_{16}	—	October 21, 1995	Kitt Peak	Spacewatch	·	580 m	MPC · JPL
806499	2016 SB_{19}	—	August 20, 2003	Campo Imperatore	CINEOS	·	510 m	MPC · JPL
806500	2016 SF_{21}	—	August 2, 2016	Haleakala	Pan-STARRS 1	·	420 m	MPC · JPL

== 806501–806600 ==
back to top

Designation			Discovery			Properties		Ref
Permanent	Provisional	Named after	Date	Site	Discoverer(s)	Category	Diam.	Ref
806501	2016 SE_{28}	—	August 28, 2016	Mount Lemmon	Mount Lemmon Survey	·	2.0 km	MPC · JPL
806502	2016 SM_{34}	—	May 21, 2015	Haleakala	Pan-STARRS 1	·	1.4 km	MPC · JPL
806503	2016 SS_{35}	—	May 23, 2011	Mount Lemmon	Mount Lemmon Survey	·	1.6 km	MPC · JPL
806504	2016 SE_{38}	—	February 23, 2012	Mount Lemmon	Mount Lemmon Survey	·	720 m	MPC · JPL
806505	2016 SK_{41}	—	September 24, 2011	Haleakala	Pan-STARRS 1	·	1.4 km	MPC · JPL
806506	2016 SJ_{42}	—	August 2, 2016	Haleakala	Pan-STARRS 1	·	1.5 km	MPC · JPL
806507	2016 SD_{45}	—	August 25, 2005	Palomar Mountain	NEAT	PHO	780 m	MPC · JPL
806508	2016 SE_{46}	—	August 28, 2016	Mount Lemmon	Mount Lemmon Survey	·	1.9 km	MPC · JPL
806509	2016 SC_{47}	—	September 22, 2016	Mount Lemmon	Mount Lemmon Survey	·	1.8 km	MPC · JPL
806510	2016 SP_{47}	—	September 25, 2016	Haleakala	Pan-STARRS 1	·	1.9 km	MPC · JPL
806511	2016 SR_{47}	—	September 25, 2016	Haleakala	Pan-STARRS 1	EOS	1.3 km	MPC · JPL
806512	2016 SF_{50}	—	September 30, 2016	Haleakala	Pan-STARRS 1	EOS	1.4 km	MPC · JPL
806513	2016 SA_{51}	—	January 23, 2006	Mount Lemmon	Mount Lemmon Survey	·	930 m	MPC · JPL
806514	2016 SA_{65}	—	September 26, 2016	Haleakala	Pan-STARRS 1	·	1.4 km	MPC · JPL
806515	2016 SB_{65}	—	September 27, 2016	Haleakala	Pan-STARRS 1	·	2.6 km	MPC · JPL
806516	2016 SM_{65}	—	September 22, 2016	Haleakala	Pan-STARRS 1	·	2.6 km	MPC · JPL
806517	2016 SY_{65}	—	September 30, 2016	Haleakala	Pan-STARRS 1	PHO	610 m	MPC · JPL
806518	2016 SJ_{67}	—	September 25, 2016	Haleakala	Pan-STARRS 1	LIX	2.6 km	MPC · JPL
806519	2016 SY_{73}	—	September 25, 2016	Haleakala	Pan-STARRS 1	·	2.0 km	MPC · JPL
806520	2016 SA_{74}	—	September 27, 2016	Haleakala	Pan-STARRS 1	·	1.3 km	MPC · JPL
806521	2016 SM_{74}	—	September 27, 2016	Mount Lemmon	Mount Lemmon Survey	·	1.8 km	MPC · JPL
806522	2016 SV_{74}	—	September 25, 2016	Mount Lemmon	Mount Lemmon Survey	·	2.2 km	MPC · JPL
806523	2016 SB_{75}	—	September 30, 2016	Haleakala	Pan-STARRS 1	·	2.5 km	MPC · JPL
806524	2016 SJ_{75}	—	September 30, 2016	Haleakala	Pan-STARRS 1	·	2.0 km	MPC · JPL
806525	2016 SP_{75}	—	September 25, 2016	Haleakala	Pan-STARRS 1	·	1.7 km	MPC · JPL
806526	2016 SR_{75}	—	September 25, 2016	Haleakala	Pan-STARRS 1	·	930 m	MPC · JPL
806527	2016 SX_{75}	—	September 27, 2016	Haleakala	Pan-STARRS 1	·	2.3 km	MPC · JPL
806528	2016 SS_{76}	—	September 30, 2016	Haleakala	Pan-STARRS 1	·	1.7 km	MPC · JPL
806529	2016 SK_{77}	—	September 25, 2016	Mount Lemmon	Mount Lemmon Survey	TIN	720 m	MPC · JPL
806530	2016 SB_{81}	—	September 22, 2016	Mount Lemmon	Mount Lemmon Survey	·	1.2 km	MPC · JPL
806531	2016 SD_{82}	—	September 26, 2016	Haleakala	Pan-STARRS 1	·	1.8 km	MPC · JPL
806532	2016 SM_{83}	—	September 27, 2016	Haleakala	Pan-STARRS 1	·	2.3 km	MPC · JPL
806533	2016 SD_{86}	—	September 30, 2016	Haleakala	Pan-STARRS 1	·	870 m	MPC · JPL
806534	2016 SN_{86}	—	September 25, 2016	Mount Lemmon	Mount Lemmon Survey	·	1.2 km	MPC · JPL
806535	2016 SU_{86}	—	September 25, 2016	Mount Lemmon	Mount Lemmon Survey	·	1.1 km	MPC · JPL
806536	2016 SS_{87}	—	September 27, 2016	Haleakala	Pan-STARRS 1	TIR	1.9 km	MPC · JPL
806537	2016 SE_{88}	—	September 26, 2016	Haleakala	Pan-STARRS 1	·	1.7 km	MPC · JPL
806538	2016 SX_{91}	—	September 25, 2016	Mount Lemmon	Mount Lemmon Survey	·	1.7 km	MPC · JPL
806539	2016 SB_{92}	—	September 27, 2016	Haleakala	Pan-STARRS 1	EOS	1.3 km	MPC · JPL
806540	2016 SJ_{97}	—	September 25, 2016	Haleakala	Pan-STARRS 1	EOS	1.4 km	MPC · JPL
806541	2016 SK_{97}	—	September 26, 2016	Haleakala	Pan-STARRS 1	·	2.1 km	MPC · JPL
806542	2016 SD_{98}	—	September 27, 2016	Haleakala	Pan-STARRS 1	·	1.5 km	MPC · JPL
806543	2016 SQ_{100}	—	September 25, 2016	Mount Lemmon	Mount Lemmon Survey	·	1.4 km	MPC · JPL
806544	2016 SR_{101}	—	September 25, 2016	Haleakala	Pan-STARRS 1	·	1.8 km	MPC · JPL
806545	2016 SD_{102}	—	September 26, 2016	Haleakala	Pan-STARRS 1	·	1.9 km	MPC · JPL
806546	2016 SQ_{102}	—	September 26, 2016	Haleakala	Pan-STARRS 1	·	1.8 km	MPC · JPL
806547	2016 SR_{102}	—	August 30, 2016	Mount Lemmon	Mount Lemmon Survey	·	1.9 km	MPC · JPL
806548	2016 ST_{103}	—	September 27, 2016	Haleakala	Pan-STARRS 1	·	2.0 km	MPC · JPL
806549	2016 SU_{103}	—	September 27, 2016	Haleakala	Pan-STARRS 1	VER	1.8 km	MPC · JPL
806550	2016 SX_{103}	—	September 25, 2016	Haleakala	Pan-STARRS 1	EOS	1.2 km	MPC · JPL
806551	2016 SD_{104}	—	September 22, 2016	Mount Lemmon	Mount Lemmon Survey	·	2.4 km	MPC · JPL
806552	2016 SM_{105}	—	September 30, 2016	Haleakala	Pan-STARRS 1	·	1.4 km	MPC · JPL
806553	2016 SZ_{108}	—	September 27, 2016	Haleakala	Pan-STARRS 1	·	1.7 km	MPC · JPL
806554	2016 SQ_{113}	—	September 22, 2016	Mount Lemmon	Mount Lemmon Survey	·	1.8 km	MPC · JPL
806555	2016 SS_{114}	—	September 25, 2016	Haleakala	Pan-STARRS 1	·	1.7 km	MPC · JPL
806556	2016 SA_{115}	—	September 25, 2016	Haleakala	Pan-STARRS 1	·	1.8 km	MPC · JPL
806557	2016 SW_{116}	—	September 26, 2016	Haleakala	Pan-STARRS 1	·	1.7 km	MPC · JPL
806558	2016 SH_{117}	—	February 18, 2015	Haleakala	Pan-STARRS 1	·	630 m	MPC · JPL
806559	2016 SJ_{117}	—	September 25, 2016	Mount Lemmon	Mount Lemmon Survey	·	1.3 km	MPC · JPL
806560	2016 SS_{117}	—	September 26, 2016	Haleakala	Pan-STARRS 1	KOR	1.0 km	MPC · JPL
806561	2016 SZ_{118}	—	September 25, 2016	Haleakala	Pan-STARRS 1	·	2.2 km	MPC · JPL
806562	2016 SM_{119}	—	September 25, 2016	Haleakala	Pan-STARRS 1	·	2.2 km	MPC · JPL
806563	2016 SX_{119}	—	September 30, 2016	Haleakala	Pan-STARRS 1	·	2.4 km	MPC · JPL
806564	2016 SE_{122}	—	September 26, 2016	Haleakala	Pan-STARRS 1	·	1.5 km	MPC · JPL
806565	2016 SN_{125}	—	September 27, 2016	Haleakala	Pan-STARRS 1	EOS	1.5 km	MPC · JPL
806566	2016 SE_{128}	—	September 26, 2016	Haleakala	Pan-STARRS 1	·	2.0 km	MPC · JPL
806567	2016 TS_{6}	—	September 13, 2012	Mount Lemmon	Mount Lemmon Survey	NYS	1 km	MPC · JPL
806568	2016 TB_{10}	—	February 19, 2015	Mount Lemmon	Mount Lemmon Survey	H	410 m	MPC · JPL
806569	2016 TV_{14}	—	May 21, 2015	Haleakala	Pan-STARRS 1	THM	1.7 km	MPC · JPL
806570	2016 TM_{22}	—	March 14, 2011	Mount Lemmon	Mount Lemmon Survey	·	830 m	MPC · JPL
806571	2016 TW_{24}	—	June 27, 2015	Haleakala	Pan-STARRS 1	·	2.0 km	MPC · JPL
806572	2016 TT_{25}	—	August 10, 2016	Haleakala	Pan-STARRS 1	·	690 m	MPC · JPL
806573	2016 TG_{26}	—	December 25, 2013	Mount Lemmon	Mount Lemmon Survey	·	1.0 km	MPC · JPL
806574	2016 TC_{31}	—	November 5, 2011	Haleakala	Pan-STARRS 1	H	340 m	MPC · JPL
806575	2016 TW_{31}	—	March 19, 2010	Mount Lemmon	Mount Lemmon Survey	H	290 m	MPC · JPL
806576	2016 TH_{34}	—	February 10, 2011	Mount Lemmon	Mount Lemmon Survey	·	910 m	MPC · JPL
806577	2016 TE_{38}	—	October 2, 2016	Mount Lemmon	Mount Lemmon Survey	·	1.3 km	MPC · JPL
806578	2016 TG_{39}	—	September 22, 2009	Kitt Peak	Spacewatch	·	430 m	MPC · JPL
806579	2016 TW_{39}	—	September 15, 2009	Kitt Peak	Spacewatch	·	640 m	MPC · JPL
806580	2016 TT_{40}	—	April 20, 2014	Mount Lemmon	Mount Lemmon Survey	·	1.9 km	MPC · JPL
806581	2016 TB_{41}	—	October 24, 2011	Haleakala	Pan-STARRS 1	EOS	1.3 km	MPC · JPL
806582	2016 TU_{41}	—	October 12, 2009	Mount Lemmon	Mount Lemmon Survey	·	980 m	MPC · JPL
806583	2016 TS_{43}	—	October 6, 2016	Haleakala	Pan-STARRS 1	·	2.3 km	MPC · JPL
806584	2016 TJ_{50}	—	October 7, 2016	Haleakala	Pan-STARRS 1	·	2.1 km	MPC · JPL
806585	2016 TV_{50}	—	August 17, 2016	Haleakala	Pan-STARRS 1	·	1.2 km	MPC · JPL
806586	2016 TR_{52}	—	August 29, 2016	Mount Lemmon	Mount Lemmon Survey	(5)	860 m	MPC · JPL
806587	2016 TL_{61}	—	September 26, 2005	Kitt Peak	Spacewatch	·	1.6 km	MPC · JPL
806588	2016 TP_{61}	—	January 7, 2014	Kitt Peak	Spacewatch	·	910 m	MPC · JPL
806589	2016 TU_{61}	—	November 12, 2006	Mount Lemmon	Mount Lemmon Survey	·	1.3 km	MPC · JPL
806590	2016 TR_{62}	—	October 24, 2011	Haleakala	Pan-STARRS 1	·	1.3 km	MPC · JPL
806591	2016 TQ_{66}	—	October 8, 2016	Mount Lemmon	Mount Lemmon Survey	·	2.7 km	MPC · JPL
806592	2016 TO_{68}	—	September 23, 2011	Kitt Peak	Spacewatch	·	1.3 km	MPC · JPL
806593	2016 TG_{69}	—	October 8, 2016	Haleakala	Pan-STARRS 1	·	1.9 km	MPC · JPL
806594	2016 TH_{71}	—	August 10, 2016	Haleakala	Pan-STARRS 1	·	1.2 km	MPC · JPL
806595	2016 TK_{74}	—	October 9, 2016	Haleakala	Pan-STARRS 1	·	2.0 km	MPC · JPL
806596	2016 TO_{77}	—	September 6, 2016	Mount Lemmon	Mount Lemmon Survey	VER	2.3 km	MPC · JPL
806597	2016 TU_{77}	—	September 27, 2016	Mount Lemmon	Mount Lemmon Survey	·	2.4 km	MPC · JPL
806598	2016 TV_{81}	—	September 27, 2016	Mount Lemmon	Mount Lemmon Survey	·	670 m	MPC · JPL
806599	2016 TX_{82}	—	September 6, 2008	Mount Lemmon	Mount Lemmon Survey	·	1.1 km	MPC · JPL
806600	2016 TQ_{90}	—	September 25, 2005	Kitt Peak	Spacewatch	·	2.1 km	MPC · JPL

== 806601–806700 ==
back to top

Designation			Discovery			Properties		Ref
Permanent	Provisional	Named after	Date	Site	Discoverer(s)	Category	Diam.	Ref
806601	2016 TH_{103}	—	October 5, 2016	Mount Lemmon	Mount Lemmon Survey	·	2.0 km	MPC · JPL
806602	2016 TV_{105}	—	October 2, 2016	Mount Lemmon	Mount Lemmon Survey	EOS	1.5 km	MPC · JPL
806603	2016 TR_{106}	—	October 9, 2016	Mount Lemmon	Mount Lemmon Survey	·	2.6 km	MPC · JPL
806604	2016 TV_{106}	—	January 18, 2009	Kitt Peak	Spacewatch	·	1.1 km	MPC · JPL
806605	2016 TY_{107}	—	October 12, 2016	Mount Lemmon	Mount Lemmon Survey	H	420 m	MPC · JPL
806606	2016 TP_{114}	—	October 13, 2016	Mount Lemmon	Mount Lemmon Survey	H	360 m	MPC · JPL
806607	2016 TU_{115}	—	October 10, 2016	Mount Lemmon	Mount Lemmon Survey	·	640 m	MPC · JPL
806608	2016 TM_{117}	—	October 8, 2016	Haleakala	Pan-STARRS 1	·	760 m	MPC · JPL
806609	2016 TD_{119}	—	October 6, 2016	Haleakala	Pan-STARRS 1	·	2.5 km	MPC · JPL
806610	2016 TY_{119}	—	August 27, 2016	Haleakala	Pan-STARRS 1	·	1.0 km	MPC · JPL
806611	2016 TB_{120}	—	October 9, 2016	Haleakala	Pan-STARRS 1	·	2.4 km	MPC · JPL
806612	2016 TK_{121}	—	October 9, 2016	Mount Lemmon	Mount Lemmon Survey	·	1.3 km	MPC · JPL
806613	2016 TQ_{121}	—	October 4, 2016	Mount Lemmon	Mount Lemmon Survey	·	1.7 km	MPC · JPL
806614	2016 TT_{121}	—	October 4, 2016	Mount Lemmon	Mount Lemmon Survey	·	800 m	MPC · JPL
806615	2016 TC_{122}	—	October 9, 2016	Mount Lemmon	Mount Lemmon Survey	·	2.0 km	MPC · JPL
806616	2016 TD_{122}	—	August 14, 2012	Haleakala	Pan-STARRS 1	·	990 m	MPC · JPL
806617	2016 TM_{122}	—	October 9, 2016	Mount Lemmon	Mount Lemmon Survey	EUN	900 m	MPC · JPL
806618	2016 TT_{122}	—	October 7, 2016	Haleakala	Pan-STARRS 1	H	390 m	MPC · JPL
806619	2016 TA_{123}	—	October 21, 2000	Kitt Peak	Spacewatch	·	1.7 km	MPC · JPL
806620	2016 TX_{125}	—	October 2, 2016	Haleakala	Pan-STARRS 1	·	2.2 km	MPC · JPL
806621	2016 TC_{126}	—	October 4, 2016	Mount Lemmon	Mount Lemmon Survey	·	2.2 km	MPC · JPL
806622	2016 TH_{126}	—	October 8, 2016	Haleakala	Pan-STARRS 1	H	290 m	MPC · JPL
806623	2016 TV_{126}	—	October 9, 2016	Haleakala	Pan-STARRS 1	H	430 m	MPC · JPL
806624	2016 TK_{128}	—	October 6, 2016	Haleakala	Pan-STARRS 1	·	1.2 km	MPC · JPL
806625	2016 TG_{131}	—	October 9, 2016	Mount Lemmon	Mount Lemmon Survey	·	1.6 km	MPC · JPL
806626	2016 TQ_{132}	—	October 7, 2016	Haleakala	Pan-STARRS 1	EOS	1.4 km	MPC · JPL
806627	2016 TL_{133}	—	October 6, 2016	Haleakala	Pan-STARRS 1	AGN	840 m	MPC · JPL
806628	2016 TO_{133}	—	October 4, 2016	Mount Lemmon	Mount Lemmon Survey	·	1.4 km	MPC · JPL
806629	2016 TR_{133}	—	September 6, 2016	Mount Lemmon	Mount Lemmon Survey	GAL	1.2 km	MPC · JPL
806630	2016 TA_{134}	—	October 10, 2016	Haleakala	Pan-STARRS 1	·	1.0 km	MPC · JPL
806631	2016 TU_{134}	—	October 9, 2016	Mount Lemmon	Mount Lemmon Survey	·	2.1 km	MPC · JPL
806632	2016 TN_{135}	—	October 10, 2016	Haleakala	Pan-STARRS 1	·	2.2 km	MPC · JPL
806633	2016 TU_{141}	—	October 9, 2016	Mount Lemmon	Mount Lemmon Survey	·	1.4 km	MPC · JPL
806634	2016 TJ_{143}	—	October 12, 2016	Haleakala	Pan-STARRS 1	·	1.1 km	MPC · JPL
806635	2016 TP_{144}	—	October 9, 2016	Haleakala	Pan-STARRS 1	·	1.9 km	MPC · JPL
806636	2016 TK_{146}	—	October 9, 2016	Haleakala	Pan-STARRS 1	·	2.8 km	MPC · JPL
806637	2016 TM_{147}	—	October 9, 2016	Haleakala	Pan-STARRS 1	H	420 m	MPC · JPL
806638	2016 TF_{149}	—	October 10, 2016	Haleakala	Pan-STARRS 1	·	1.0 km	MPC · JPL
806639	2016 TX_{149}	—	October 7, 2016	Haleakala	Pan-STARRS 1	(5)	700 m	MPC · JPL
806640	2016 TZ_{149}	—	October 10, 2016	Mount Lemmon	Mount Lemmon Survey	·	2.6 km	MPC · JPL
806641	2016 TY_{153}	—	October 11, 2016	Mount Lemmon	Mount Lemmon Survey	·	1.4 km	MPC · JPL
806642	2016 TT_{154}	—	October 9, 2016	Haleakala	Pan-STARRS 1	·	770 m	MPC · JPL
806643	2016 TA_{155}	—	October 9, 2016	Mount Lemmon	Mount Lemmon Survey	·	1.9 km	MPC · JPL
806644	2016 TD_{158}	—	October 23, 2011	Haleakala	Pan-STARRS 1	·	2.0 km	MPC · JPL
806645	2016 TG_{160}	—	August 10, 2016	Haleakala	Pan-STARRS 1	·	2.2 km	MPC · JPL
806646	2016 TU_{163}	—	October 7, 2016	Haleakala	Pan-STARRS 1	·	1 km	MPC · JPL
806647	2016 TG_{166}	—	October 2, 2016	Mount Lemmon	Mount Lemmon Survey	·	2.2 km	MPC · JPL
806648	2016 TL_{166}	—	October 10, 2016	Haleakala	Pan-STARRS 1	·	2.4 km	MPC · JPL
806649	2016 TW_{166}	—	September 26, 2016	Haleakala	Pan-STARRS 1	·	1.3 km	MPC · JPL
806650	2016 TE_{167}	—	October 6, 2016	Haleakala	Pan-STARRS 1	·	1.4 km	MPC · JPL
806651	2016 TV_{167}	—	October 12, 2016	Haleakala	Pan-STARRS 1	KOR	920 m	MPC · JPL
806652	2016 TZ_{167}	—	October 13, 2016	Haleakala	Pan-STARRS 1	·	1.5 km	MPC · JPL
806653	2016 TS_{168}	—	October 6, 2016	Mount Lemmon	Mount Lemmon Survey	·	2.1 km	MPC · JPL
806654	2016 TR_{169}	—	October 12, 2016	Haleakala	Pan-STARRS 1	·	1.9 km	MPC · JPL
806655	2016 TT_{169}	—	October 7, 2016	Kitt Peak	Spacewatch	·	2.4 km	MPC · JPL
806656	2016 TU_{169}	—	September 6, 2016	Mount Lemmon	Mount Lemmon Survey	·	2.3 km	MPC · JPL
806657	2016 TF_{171}	—	October 10, 2016	Haleakala	Pan-STARRS 1	·	2.5 km	MPC · JPL
806658	2016 TO_{171}	—	October 4, 2016	Mount Lemmon	Mount Lemmon Survey	·	2.0 km	MPC · JPL
806659	2016 TU_{171}	—	October 10, 2016	Haleakala	Pan-STARRS 1	(895)	2.3 km	MPC · JPL
806660	2016 TG_{173}	—	October 10, 2016	Haleakala	Pan-STARRS 1	ARM	2.3 km	MPC · JPL
806661	2016 TQ_{173}	—	October 6, 2016	Haleakala	Pan-STARRS 1	EOS	1.2 km	MPC · JPL
806662	2016 TY_{174}	—	October 12, 2016	Haleakala	Pan-STARRS 1	·	2.1 km	MPC · JPL
806663	2016 TD_{175}	—	October 6, 2016	Haleakala	Pan-STARRS 1	·	2.1 km	MPC · JPL
806664	2016 TQ_{184}	—	October 4, 2016	Kitt Peak	Spacewatch	·	1.2 km	MPC · JPL
806665	2016 TM_{185}	—	October 6, 2016	Haleakala	Pan-STARRS 1	·	1.5 km	MPC · JPL
806666	2016 TF_{186}	—	October 5, 2016	Mount Lemmon	Mount Lemmon Survey	T_{j} (2.93)	2.9 km	MPC · JPL
806667	2016 TW_{187}	—	October 9, 2016	Haleakala	Pan-STARRS 1	URS	2.3 km	MPC · JPL
806668	2016 TG_{188}	—	October 8, 2016	Haleakala	Pan-STARRS 1	·	2.4 km	MPC · JPL
806669	2016 TH_{191}	—	October 6, 2016	Haleakala	Pan-STARRS 1	EUN	810 m	MPC · JPL
806670	2016 TY_{191}	—	October 6, 2016	Haleakala	Pan-STARRS 1	·	1.9 km	MPC · JPL
806671	2016 TQ_{192}	—	October 7, 2016	Haleakala	Pan-STARRS 1	·	1.6 km	MPC · JPL
806672	2016 TD_{193}	—	October 9, 2016	Haleakala	Pan-STARRS 1	·	1.9 km	MPC · JPL
806673	2016 TX_{194}	—	October 7, 2016	Haleakala	Pan-STARRS 1	EOS	1.4 km	MPC · JPL
806674	2016 TS_{196}	—	October 10, 2016	Haleakala	Pan-STARRS 1	·	1.4 km	MPC · JPL
806675	2016 TC_{199}	—	October 12, 2016	Haleakala	Pan-STARRS 1	·	2.4 km	MPC · JPL
806676	2016 TQ_{200}	—	April 1, 2014	Mount Lemmon	Mount Lemmon Survey	·	1.3 km	MPC · JPL
806677	2016 TA_{201}	—	October 7, 2016	Haleakala	Pan-STARRS 1	·	1.1 km	MPC · JPL
806678	2016 TO_{212}	—	October 12, 2016	Haleakala	Pan-STARRS 1	·	950 m	MPC · JPL
806679	2016 UN_{3}	—	August 30, 2005	Kitt Peak	Spacewatch	·	900 m	MPC · JPL
806680	2016 UG_{4}	—	August 17, 2009	Kitt Peak	Spacewatch	·	590 m	MPC · JPL
806681	2016 UF_{7}	—	August 27, 2005	Palomar Mountain	NEAT	·	820 m	MPC · JPL
806682	2016 UP_{7}	—	September 2, 2016	Mount Lemmon	Mount Lemmon Survey	DOR	1.7 km	MPC · JPL
806683	2016 UK_{9}	—	February 25, 2015	Haleakala	Pan-STARRS 1	·	990 m	MPC · JPL
806684	2016 UM_{12}	—	January 4, 2013	Cerro Tololo	D. E. Trilling, R. L. Allen	·	2.0 km	MPC · JPL
806685	2016 UH_{13}	—	October 20, 2016	Mount Lemmon	Mount Lemmon Survey	VER	1.9 km	MPC · JPL
806686	2016 UM_{13}	—	October 24, 2011	Kitt Peak	Spacewatch	·	1.9 km	MPC · JPL
806687	2016 UH_{15}	—	March 16, 2015	Mount Lemmon	Mount Lemmon Survey	·	530 m	MPC · JPL
806688	2016 UC_{16}	—	October 13, 2005	Kitt Peak	Spacewatch	·	930 m	MPC · JPL
806689	2016 UT_{16}	—	October 20, 2016	Mount Lemmon	Mount Lemmon Survey	·	2.4 km	MPC · JPL
806690	2016 UO_{17}	—	September 18, 2009	Mount Lemmon	Mount Lemmon Survey	·	560 m	MPC · JPL
806691	2016 UR_{30}	—	October 26, 2009	Mount Lemmon	Mount Lemmon Survey	V	450 m	MPC · JPL
806692	2016 UO_{31}	—	October 26, 2011	Haleakala	Pan-STARRS 1	H	450 m	MPC · JPL
806693	2016 UX_{32}	—	October 20, 2016	Mount Lemmon	Mount Lemmon Survey	EOS	1.3 km	MPC · JPL
806694	2016 UA_{33}	—	April 1, 2011	Mount Lemmon	Mount Lemmon Survey	V	580 m	MPC · JPL
806695	2016 UL_{42}	—	September 30, 2016	Haleakala	Pan-STARRS 1	H	410 m	MPC · JPL
806696	2016 UP_{43}	—	October 13, 1998	Kitt Peak	Spacewatch	·	810 m	MPC · JPL
806697	2016 UR_{50}	—	October 21, 2009	Mount Lemmon	Mount Lemmon Survey	·	530 m	MPC · JPL
806698	2016 UA_{52}	—	September 2, 2016	Mount Lemmon	Mount Lemmon Survey	·	980 m	MPC · JPL
806699	2016 UQ_{53}	—	October 21, 2016	Mount Lemmon	Mount Lemmon Survey	·	2.0 km	MPC · JPL
806700	2016 UK_{58}	—	October 10, 2016	Haleakala	Pan-STARRS 1	·	940 m	MPC · JPL

== 806701–806800 ==
back to top

Designation			Discovery			Properties		Ref
Permanent	Provisional	Named after	Date	Site	Discoverer(s)	Category	Diam.	Ref
806701	2016 UO_{71}	—	October 1, 2005	Kitt Peak	Spacewatch	MAS	570 m	MPC · JPL
806702	2016 UY_{77}	—	February 26, 2014	Mount Lemmon	Mount Lemmon Survey	MAS	410 m	MPC · JPL
806703	2016 UF_{78}	—	September 30, 2016	Haleakala	Pan-STARRS 1	·	1.4 km	MPC · JPL
806704	2016 UF_{81}	—	August 15, 2009	Kitt Peak	Spacewatch	·	410 m	MPC · JPL
806705	2016 UE_{83}	—	October 26, 2016	Haleakala	Pan-STARRS 1	·	830 m	MPC · JPL
806706	2016 UU_{87}	—	October 26, 2016	Haleakala	Pan-STARRS 1	·	2.0 km	MPC · JPL
806707	2016 UW_{88}	—	March 24, 2012	Kitt Peak	Spacewatch	·	500 m	MPC · JPL
806708	2016 UT_{92}	—	December 11, 2009	Mount Lemmon	Mount Lemmon Survey	NYS	720 m	MPC · JPL
806709	2016 UB_{94}	—	October 21, 2016	Mount Lemmon	Mount Lemmon Survey	·	1.9 km	MPC · JPL
806710	2016 UZ_{97}	—	November 20, 2007	Mount Lemmon	Mount Lemmon Survey	·	1.4 km	MPC · JPL
806711	2016 UF_{100}	—	November 20, 2003	Kitt Peak	Deep Ecliptic Survey	·	1.2 km	MPC · JPL
806712	2016 UJ_{100}	—	October 12, 2016	Mount Lemmon	Mount Lemmon Survey	·	2.3 km	MPC · JPL
806713	2016 UD_{101}	—	September 12, 2016	Haleakala	Pan-STARRS 1	AMO	240 m	MPC · JPL
806714	2016 US_{101}	—	January 28, 2014	Mount Lemmon	Mount Lemmon Survey	MAS	550 m	MPC · JPL
806715	2016 UA_{105}	—	November 25, 2005	Kitt Peak	Spacewatch	MAS	460 m	MPC · JPL
806716	2016 UU_{105}	—	November 21, 2009	Kitt Peak	Spacewatch	·	900 m	MPC · JPL
806717	2016 UF_{106}	—	April 23, 2014	Cerro Tololo-DECam	DECam	VER	1.8 km	MPC · JPL
806718	2016 UL_{107}	—	October 27, 2016	Haleakala	Pan-STARRS 1	3:2	3.4 km	MPC · JPL
806719	2016 UD_{110}	—	October 26, 2016	Haleakala	Pan-STARRS 1	KOR	950 m	MPC · JPL
806720	2016 UR_{110}	—	March 26, 2007	Mount Lemmon	Mount Lemmon Survey	·	620 m	MPC · JPL
806721	2016 UX_{116}	—	December 6, 2012	Mount Lemmon	Mount Lemmon Survey	·	1.1 km	MPC · JPL
806722	2016 UG_{117}	—	October 26, 2016	Haleakala	Pan-STARRS 1	·	660 m	MPC · JPL
806723	2016 UR_{117}	—	August 26, 2011	Westfield	International Astronomical Search Collaboration	·	1.3 km	MPC · JPL
806724	2016 UK_{121}	—	January 25, 2014	Haleakala	Pan-STARRS 1	·	870 m	MPC · JPL
806725	2016 UG_{122}	—	February 26, 2014	Haleakala	Pan-STARRS 1	·	1.1 km	MPC · JPL
806726	2016 UA_{123}	—	October 27, 2016	Haleakala	Pan-STARRS 1	TIR	1.7 km	MPC · JPL
806727	2016 UQ_{127}	—	October 26, 2016	Haleakala	Pan-STARRS 1	·	840 m	MPC · JPL
806728	2016 UW_{127}	—	October 25, 2016	Haleakala	Pan-STARRS 1	·	1.3 km	MPC · JPL
806729	2016 UC_{130}	—	April 23, 2015	Haleakala	Pan-STARRS 2	·	550 m	MPC · JPL
806730	2016 UL_{131}	—	March 1, 2008	Kitt Peak	Spacewatch	·	550 m	MPC · JPL
806731	2016 UW_{131}	—	October 27, 2016	Haleakala	Pan-STARRS 1	·	1.2 km	MPC · JPL
806732	2016 UJ_{136}	—	April 18, 2009	Kitt Peak	Spacewatch	·	2.5 km	MPC · JPL
806733	2016 UH_{137}	—	October 27, 2016	Haleakala	Pan-STARRS 1	·	2.0 km	MPC · JPL
806734	2016 UC_{139}	—	August 17, 2016	Haleakala	Pan-STARRS 1	PHO	670 m	MPC · JPL
806735	2016 UK_{139}	—	October 9, 2016	Haleakala	Pan-STARRS 1	EOS	1.6 km	MPC · JPL
806736	2016 UY_{145}	—	September 18, 2009	Kitt Peak	Spacewatch	·	650 m	MPC · JPL
806737	2016 UW_{151}	—	October 20, 2016	Kitt Peak	Spacewatch	·	2.0 km	MPC · JPL
806738	2016 UX_{156}	—	January 25, 2014	Haleakala	Pan-STARRS 1	NYS	670 m	MPC · JPL
806739	2016 UA_{157}	—	January 20, 2018	Haleakala	Pan-STARRS 1	·	770 m	MPC · JPL
806740	2016 UR_{163}	—	March 6, 2011	Mount Lemmon	Mount Lemmon Survey	·	460 m	MPC · JPL
806741	2016 UZ_{165}	—	April 23, 2014	Cerro Tololo	DECam	·	2.0 km	MPC · JPL
806742	2016 UM_{173}	—	June 16, 2015	Haleakala	Pan-STARRS 1	·	1.7 km	MPC · JPL
806743	2016 UP_{175}	—	October 28, 2016	Haleakala	Pan-STARRS 1	THM	1.4 km	MPC · JPL
806744	2016 UM_{188}	—	October 26, 2016	Haleakala	Pan-STARRS 1	·	1.7 km	MPC · JPL
806745	2016 UU_{200}	—	June 19, 2015	Haleakala	Pan-STARRS 1	·	1.8 km	MPC · JPL
806746	2016 UL_{207}	—	February 23, 2018	Mount Lemmon	Mount Lemmon Survey	MAS	470 m	MPC · JPL
806747	2016 UL_{209}	—	October 27, 2016	Haleakala	Pan-STARRS 1	·	1.7 km	MPC · JPL
806748	2016 UP_{214}	—	May 30, 2019	Haleakala	Pan-STARRS 1	·	970 m	MPC · JPL
806749	2016 UN_{216}	—	May 8, 2019	Haleakala	Pan-STARRS 1	·	1.1 km	MPC · JPL
806750	2016 UF_{228}	—	October 27, 2016	Haleakala	Pan-STARRS 1	PHO	650 m	MPC · JPL
806751	2016 UG_{238}	—	October 26, 2016	Haleakala	Pan-STARRS 1	·	1.3 km	MPC · JPL
806752	2016 UB_{247}	—	October 29, 2016	Mount Lemmon	Mount Lemmon Survey	H	480 m	MPC · JPL
806753	2016 UW_{247}	—	October 21, 2016	Mount Lemmon	Mount Lemmon Survey	·	910 m	MPC · JPL
806754	2016 UX_{247}	—	October 19, 2016	Mount Lemmon	Mount Lemmon Survey	·	1.0 km	MPC · JPL
806755	2016 UF_{248}	—	October 25, 2016	Haleakala	Pan-STARRS 1	ELF	2.4 km	MPC · JPL
806756	2016 UV_{248}	—	October 28, 2016	Haleakala	Pan-STARRS 1	·	2.0 km	MPC · JPL
806757	2016 UF_{249}	—	October 21, 2016	Mount Lemmon	Mount Lemmon Survey	EOS	1.3 km	MPC · JPL
806758	2016 UT_{249}	—	October 28, 2016	Haleakala	Pan-STARRS 1	·	700 m	MPC · JPL
806759	2016 UF_{250}	—	October 21, 2016	Mount Lemmon	Mount Lemmon Survey	PAD	1.3 km	MPC · JPL
806760	2016 UX_{252}	—	October 20, 2016	Mount Lemmon	Mount Lemmon Survey	·	2.1 km	MPC · JPL
806761	2016 UP_{253}	—	October 22, 2016	Kitt Peak	Spacewatch	·	1.2 km	MPC · JPL
806762	2016 UT_{253}	—	October 27, 2016	Mount Lemmon	Mount Lemmon Survey	·	1.6 km	MPC · JPL
806763	2016 UZ_{255}	—	October 30, 2016	Mount Lemmon	Mount Lemmon Survey	·	1.4 km	MPC · JPL
806764	2016 UJ_{261}	—	October 31, 2016	Mount Lemmon	Mount Lemmon Survey	·	590 m	MPC · JPL
806765	2016 UB_{270}	—	October 21, 2016	Mount Lemmon	Mount Lemmon Survey	·	2.0 km	MPC · JPL
806766	2016 UE_{270}	—	October 27, 2016	Mount Lemmon	Mount Lemmon Survey	VER	2.2 km	MPC · JPL
806767	2016 UG_{271}	—	October 25, 2016	Haleakala	Pan-STARRS 1	·	2.1 km	MPC · JPL
806768	2016 UH_{272}	—	October 25, 2016	Haleakala	Pan-STARRS 1	VER	1.8 km	MPC · JPL
806769	2016 UJ_{272}	—	October 25, 2016	Haleakala	Pan-STARRS 1	·	2.1 km	MPC · JPL
806770	2016 UV_{274}	—	October 10, 2016	Mount Lemmon	Mount Lemmon Survey	·	500 m	MPC · JPL
806771	2016 UZ_{277}	—	October 28, 2016	Haleakala	Pan-STARRS 1	EOS	1.1 km	MPC · JPL
806772	2016 UM_{278}	—	October 25, 2016	Haleakala	Pan-STARRS 1	KOR	890 m	MPC · JPL
806773	2016 UQ_{279}	—	October 28, 2016	Haleakala	Pan-STARRS 1	·	2.5 km	MPC · JPL
806774	2016 UF_{280}	—	October 21, 2016	Mount Lemmon	Mount Lemmon Survey	·	1.0 km	MPC · JPL
806775	2016 UK_{280}	—	October 25, 2016	Haleakala	Pan-STARRS 1	VER	1.7 km	MPC · JPL
806776	2016 UD_{281}	—	October 25, 2016	Haleakala	Pan-STARRS 1	·	2.3 km	MPC · JPL
806777	2016 UO_{281}	—	October 20, 2016	Haleakala	Pan-STARRS 1	·	2.1 km	MPC · JPL
806778	2016 UH_{283}	—	October 25, 2016	Haleakala	Pan-STARRS 1	VER	1.6 km	MPC · JPL
806779	2016 VP_{7}	—	September 23, 2012	Mount Lemmon	Mount Lemmon Survey	·	850 m	MPC · JPL
806780	2016 VU_{12}	—	May 2, 2014	Mount Lemmon	Mount Lemmon Survey	URS	2.3 km	MPC · JPL
806781	2016 VQ_{13}	—	November 8, 2016	Haleakala	Pan-STARRS 1	·	2.1 km	MPC · JPL
806782	2016 VE_{15}	—	October 8, 2016	Haleakala	Pan-STARRS 1	PHO	780 m	MPC · JPL
806783	2016 VD_{26}	—	November 5, 2016	Mount Lemmon	Mount Lemmon Survey	·	1.4 km	MPC · JPL
806784	2016 VG_{26}	—	November 6, 2016	Haleakala	Pan-STARRS 1	PHO	1.1 km	MPC · JPL
806785	2016 VL_{28}	—	November 11, 2016	Mount Lemmon	Mount Lemmon Survey	H	500 m	MPC · JPL
806786	2016 VW_{28}	—	November 5, 2016	Haleakala	Pan-STARRS 1	·	2.5 km	MPC · JPL
806787	2016 VC_{30}	—	November 5, 2016	Haleakala	Pan-STARRS 1	·	2.5 km	MPC · JPL
806788	2016 VV_{30}	—	November 11, 2016	Mount Lemmon	Mount Lemmon Survey	·	1.7 km	MPC · JPL
806789	2016 VG_{31}	—	November 5, 2016	Haleakala	Pan-STARRS 1	·	2.3 km	MPC · JPL
806790	2016 VR_{31}	—	November 10, 2016	Haleakala	Pan-STARRS 1	L5	5.8 km	MPC · JPL
806791	2016 VA_{33}	—	November 6, 2016	Mount Lemmon	Mount Lemmon Survey	·	1.6 km	MPC · JPL
806792	2016 VG_{34}	—	November 5, 2016	Mount Lemmon	Mount Lemmon Survey	·	1.0 km	MPC · JPL
806793	2016 VR_{34}	—	November 4, 2016	Haleakala	Pan-STARRS 1	BRG	1.0 km	MPC · JPL
806794	2016 VU_{38}	—	November 11, 2016	Mount Lemmon	Mount Lemmon Survey	·	820 m	MPC · JPL
806795	2016 VP_{40}	—	November 10, 2016	Haleakala	Pan-STARRS 1	·	950 m	MPC · JPL
806796	2016 VZ_{43}	—	November 10, 2016	Haleakala	Pan-STARRS 1	·	1.4 km	MPC · JPL
806797	2016 VP_{49}	—	November 6, 2016	Kitt Peak	Spacewatch	615	1.0 km	MPC · JPL
806798	2016 VX_{49}	—	November 4, 2016	Haleakala	Pan-STARRS 1	·	2.3 km	MPC · JPL
806799	2016 VT_{52}	—	November 4, 2016	Haleakala	Pan-STARRS 1	VER	1.9 km	MPC · JPL
806800	2016 VY_{52}	—	November 6, 2016	Mount Lemmon	Mount Lemmon Survey	·	1.9 km	MPC · JPL

== 806801–806900 ==
back to top

Designation			Discovery			Properties		Ref
Permanent	Provisional	Named after	Date	Site	Discoverer(s)	Category	Diam.	Ref
806801	2016 VJ_{53}	—	November 5, 2016	Haleakala	Pan-STARRS 1	·	1.2 km	MPC · JPL
806802	2016 VN_{53}	—	November 6, 2016	Mount Lemmon	Mount Lemmon Survey	·	2.1 km	MPC · JPL
806803	2016 VX_{53}	—	November 6, 2016	Mount Lemmon	Mount Lemmon Survey	·	1.5 km	MPC · JPL
806804	2016 VE_{54}	—	November 7, 2016	Mount Lemmon	Mount Lemmon Survey	·	1.6 km	MPC · JPL
806805	2016 VY_{54}	—	November 5, 2016	Haleakala	Pan-STARRS 1	VER	1.8 km	MPC · JPL
806806	2016 VF_{61}	—	November 7, 2016	Mount Lemmon	Mount Lemmon Survey	MIS	1.8 km	MPC · JPL
806807	2016 VH_{61}	—	November 4, 2016	Haleakala	Pan-STARRS 1	·	1.3 km	MPC · JPL
806808	2016 VN_{61}	—	November 6, 2016	Mount Lemmon	Mount Lemmon Survey	·	910 m	MPC · JPL
806809	2016 VW_{63}	—	September 18, 2006	Kitt Peak	Spacewatch	·	1.6 km	MPC · JPL
806810	2016 WC_{3}	—	November 15, 2006	Mount Lemmon	Mount Lemmon Survey	H	480 m	MPC · JPL
806811	2016 WL_{3}	—	August 27, 2009	Catalina	CSS	·	540 m	MPC · JPL
806812	2016 WA_{4}	—	June 13, 2015	Haleakala	Pan-STARRS 1	·	1.9 km	MPC · JPL
806813	2016 WP_{7}	—	January 19, 2012	Catalina	CSS	H	470 m	MPC · JPL
806814	2016 WQ_{7}	—	November 25, 2016	Mount Lemmon	Mount Lemmon Survey	·	1.2 km	MPC · JPL
806815	2016 WS_{11}	—	October 9, 2016	Mount Lemmon	Mount Lemmon Survey	(5)	730 m	MPC · JPL
806816	2016 WA_{13}	—	September 27, 2016	Mount Lemmon	Mount Lemmon Survey	critical	830 m	MPC · JPL
806817	2016 WH_{13}	—	October 7, 2016	Haleakala	Pan-STARRS 1	AEO	730 m	MPC · JPL
806818	2016 WO_{16}	—	December 8, 2005	Kitt Peak	Spacewatch	·	950 m	MPC · JPL
806819	2016 WU_{16}	—	April 15, 2010	Kitt Peak	Spacewatch	H	440 m	MPC · JPL
806820	2016 WR_{21}	—	November 17, 2011	Kitt Peak	Spacewatch	H	450 m	MPC · JPL
806821	2016 WR_{26}	—	November 23, 2016	Mount Lemmon	Mount Lemmon Survey	·	1.8 km	MPC · JPL
806822	2016 WS_{29}	—	May 22, 2015	Haleakala	Pan-STARRS 1	·	890 m	MPC · JPL
806823	2016 WF_{31}	—	September 13, 2005	Catalina	CSS	·	830 m	MPC · JPL
806824	2016 WX_{33}	—	September 11, 2016	Mount Lemmon	Mount Lemmon Survey	H	500 m	MPC · JPL
806825	2016 WP_{34}	—	October 7, 2012	Haleakala	Pan-STARRS 1	V	560 m	MPC · JPL
806826	2016 WD_{39}	—	November 9, 2009	Kitt Peak	Spacewatch	·	840 m	MPC · JPL
806827	2016 WA_{41}	—	February 3, 2009	Kitt Peak	Spacewatch	·	1.0 km	MPC · JPL
806828	2016 WX_{41}	—	October 26, 2016	Haleakala	Pan-STARRS 1	·	1.8 km	MPC · JPL
806829	2016 WM_{43}	—	October 31, 2016	Mount Lemmon	Mount Lemmon Survey	PHO	620 m	MPC · JPL
806830	2016 WZ_{52}	—	October 23, 2016	Mount Lemmon	Mount Lemmon Survey	·	810 m	MPC · JPL
806831	2016 WT_{53}	—	November 28, 2005	Junk Bond	D. Healy	·	950 m	MPC · JPL
806832	2016 WV_{53}	—	December 11, 2009	Mount Lemmon	Mount Lemmon Survey	·	870 m	MPC · JPL
806833	2016 WG_{62}	—	November 25, 2016	Mount Lemmon	Mount Lemmon Survey	LUT	3.2 km	MPC · JPL
806834	2016 WB_{63}	—	November 28, 2016	Haleakala	Pan-STARRS 1	EUN	780 m	MPC · JPL
806835	2016 WZ_{63}	—	November 26, 2016	Haleakala	Pan-STARRS 1	·	1.3 km	MPC · JPL
806836	2016 WY_{71}	—	November 23, 2016	Mount Lemmon	Mount Lemmon Survey	·	1.2 km	MPC · JPL
806837	2016 WV_{77}	—	October 13, 2005	Kitt Peak	Spacewatch	·	1.7 km	MPC · JPL
806838	2016 WS_{80}	—	November 24, 2016	Mount Lemmon	Mount Lemmon Survey	EOS	1.3 km	MPC · JPL
806839	2016 WF_{83}	—	November 26, 2016	Haleakala	Pan-STARRS 1	·	1.8 km	MPC · JPL
806840	2016 WK_{86}	—	November 25, 2016	Mount Lemmon	Mount Lemmon Survey	·	1.3 km	MPC · JPL
806841	2016 XJ_{1}	—	October 19, 2016	Haleakala	Pan-STARRS 1	PHO	940 m	MPC · JPL
806842	2016 XY_{1}	—	December 5, 2016	Mount Lemmon	Mount Lemmon Survey	H	400 m	MPC · JPL
806843	2016 XP_{2}	—	November 11, 2016	Mount Lemmon	Mount Lemmon Survey	·	880 m	MPC · JPL
806844	2016 XB_{12}	—	March 30, 2015	Haleakala	Pan-STARRS 1	H	430 m	MPC · JPL
806845	2016 XW_{13}	—	April 6, 2011	Mount Lemmon	Mount Lemmon Survey	·	1.1 km	MPC · JPL
806846	2016 XC_{16}	—	November 20, 2016	Mount Lemmon	Mount Lemmon Survey	·	2.1 km	MPC · JPL
806847	2016 XX_{23}	—	December 1, 2005	Palomar Mountain	NEAT	fast	1.2 km	MPC · JPL
806848	2016 XB_{25}	—	December 6, 2016	Mount Lemmon	Mount Lemmon Survey	H	430 m	MPC · JPL
806849	2016 XO_{26}	—	December 5, 2016	Mount Lemmon	Mount Lemmon Survey	·	1.3 km	MPC · JPL
806850	2016 XD_{28}	—	December 1, 2016	Mount Lemmon	Mount Lemmon Survey	·	1.3 km	MPC · JPL
806851	2016 XU_{33}	—	December 4, 2016	Mount Lemmon	Mount Lemmon Survey	·	2.3 km	MPC · JPL
806852	2016 XZ_{37}	—	December 4, 2016	Mount Lemmon	Mount Lemmon Survey	·	1.4 km	MPC · JPL
806853	2016 XF_{38}	—	September 14, 2007	Mount Lemmon	Mount Lemmon Survey	·	1.1 km	MPC · JPL
806854	2016 XL_{38}	—	December 1, 2016	Mount Lemmon	Mount Lemmon Survey	GAL	1.2 km	MPC · JPL
806855	2016 YX_{3}	—	November 2, 2008	Catalina	CSS	H	490 m	MPC · JPL
806856	2016 YD_{7}	—	July 28, 2015	Haleakala	Pan-STARRS 1	·	2.5 km	MPC · JPL
806857	2016 YG_{9}	—	December 27, 2016	Mount Lemmon	Mount Lemmon Survey	·	1.9 km	MPC · JPL
806858	2016 YU_{14}	—	December 23, 2016	Haleakala	Pan-STARRS 1	PHO	800 m	MPC · JPL
806859	2016 YC_{16}	—	December 23, 2016	Haleakala	Pan-STARRS 1	EUN	830 m	MPC · JPL
806860	2016 YK_{17}	—	December 23, 2016	Haleakala	Pan-STARRS 1	H	440 m	MPC · JPL
806861	2016 YF_{18}	—	December 23, 2016	Haleakala	Pan-STARRS 1	·	770 m	MPC · JPL
806862	2016 YP_{19}	—	December 23, 2016	Haleakala	Pan-STARRS 1	L5	6.8 km	MPC · JPL
806863	2016 YV_{28}	—	December 23, 2016	Haleakala	Pan-STARRS 1	L5	5.9 km	MPC · JPL
806864	2016 YW_{28}	—	December 25, 2016	Haleakala	Pan-STARRS 1	·	1.1 km	MPC · JPL
806865	2016 YV_{34}	—	December 23, 2016	Haleakala	Pan-STARRS 1	(5)	690 m	MPC · JPL
806866	2016 YW_{40}	—	December 23, 2016	Mauna Kea	COIAS	·	1.7 km	MPC · JPL
806867	2016 YE_{44}	—	December 23, 2016	Haleakala	Pan-STARRS 1	·	880 m	MPC · JPL
806868	2017 AM_{3}	—	September 6, 2010	Socorro	LINEAR	H	470 m	MPC · JPL
806869	2017 AV_{13}	—	July 7, 2015	Haleakala	Pan-STARRS 1	H	410 m	MPC · JPL
806870	2017 AJ_{19}	—	November 10, 2016	Haleakala	Pan-STARRS 1	H	470 m	MPC · JPL
806871	2017 AT_{24}	—	April 15, 2013	Haleakala	Pan-STARRS 1	·	1.2 km	MPC · JPL
806872	2017 AA_{25}	—	January 2, 2016	Mount Lemmon	Mount Lemmon Survey	·	3.8 km	MPC · JPL
806873	2017 AQ_{28}	—	January 4, 2017	Haleakala	Pan-STARRS 1	·	760 m	MPC · JPL
806874	2017 AY_{30}	—	January 2, 2017	Haleakala	Pan-STARRS 1	MAR	1.0 km	MPC · JPL
806875	2017 AB_{32}	—	December 1, 2005	Palomar Mountain	NEAT	·	1.1 km	MPC · JPL
806876	2017 AR_{33}	—	January 3, 2017	Haleakala	Pan-STARRS 1	·	1.1 km	MPC · JPL
806877	2017 AK_{35}	—	January 4, 2017	Haleakala	Pan-STARRS 1	H	420 m	MPC · JPL
806878	2017 AA_{37}	—	January 7, 2017	Mount Lemmon	Mount Lemmon Survey	·	1.5 km	MPC · JPL
806879	2017 AL_{37}	—	January 4, 2017	Haleakala	Pan-STARRS 1	·	1.3 km	MPC · JPL
806880	2017 AJ_{40}	—	January 4, 2017	Haleakala	Pan-STARRS 1	·	1.6 km	MPC · JPL
806881	2017 AV_{45}	—	January 2, 2017	Haleakala	Pan-STARRS 1	LIX	2.2 km	MPC · JPL
806882	2017 AO_{47}	—	May 15, 2013	Haleakala	Pan-STARRS 1	·	1.8 km	MPC · JPL
806883	2017 AG_{50}	—	January 2, 2017	Haleakala	Pan-STARRS 1	·	2.2 km	MPC · JPL
806884	2017 AW_{50}	—	January 4, 2017	Haleakala	Pan-STARRS 1	·	740 m	MPC · JPL
806885	2017 AD_{51}	—	January 7, 2017	Mount Lemmon	Mount Lemmon Survey	·	1.9 km	MPC · JPL
806886	2017 AN_{51}	—	January 4, 2017	Haleakala	Pan-STARRS 1	·	940 m	MPC · JPL
806887	2017 AP_{51}	—	January 2, 2017	Haleakala	Pan-STARRS 1	·	1.4 km	MPC · JPL
806888	2017 AW_{51}	—	January 2, 2017	Haleakala	Pan-STARRS 1	·	2.0 km	MPC · JPL
806889	2017 AV_{53}	—	January 5, 2017	Mount Lemmon	Mount Lemmon Survey	·	2.1 km	MPC · JPL
806890	2017 AZ_{54}	—	November 2, 2015	Haleakala	Pan-STARRS 1	·	2.2 km	MPC · JPL
806891	2017 AT_{67}	—	January 7, 2017	Mount Lemmon	Mount Lemmon Survey	·	940 m	MPC · JPL
806892	2017 BO	—	November 10, 2016	Haleakala	Pan-STARRS 1	H	470 m	MPC · JPL
806893	2017 BQ_{4}	—	August 27, 2012	Haleakala	Pan-STARRS 1	PHO	670 m	MPC · JPL
806894	2017 BB_{11}	—	September 19, 1998	Sacramento Peak	SDSS	MIS	1.7 km	MPC · JPL
806895	2017 BE_{12}	—	November 3, 2008	Kitt Peak	Spacewatch	NYS	930 m	MPC · JPL
806896	2017 BM_{12}	—	February 14, 2004	Haleakala	NEAT	·	370 m	MPC · JPL
806897	2017 BA_{20}	—	July 28, 2014	Haleakala	Pan-STARRS 1	·	1.4 km	MPC · JPL
806898	2017 BZ_{29}	—	January 28, 2017	Mount Lemmon	Mount Lemmon Survey	H	490 m	MPC · JPL
806899	2017 BO_{31}	—	January 27, 2017	Haleakala	Pan-STARRS 1	T_{j} (2.92) · APO	400 m	MPC · JPL
806900	2017 BX_{31}	—	January 26, 2017	Haleakala	Pan-STARRS 1	·	980 m	MPC · JPL

== 806901–807000 ==
back to top

Designation			Discovery			Properties		Ref
Permanent	Provisional	Named after	Date	Site	Discoverer(s)	Category	Diam.	Ref
806901	2017 BC_{32}	—	February 21, 2012	Kitt Peak	Spacewatch	H	410 m	MPC · JPL
806902	2017 BV_{33}	—	May 3, 2006	Mount Lemmon	Mount Lemmon Survey	NYS	1.0 km	MPC · JPL
806903	2017 BZ_{34}	—	January 4, 2017	Haleakala	Pan-STARRS 1	H	400 m	MPC · JPL
806904	2017 BL_{39}	—	January 9, 2017	Mount Lemmon	Mount Lemmon Survey	NYS	960 m	MPC · JPL
806905	2017 BD_{43}	—	February 3, 2000	Kitt Peak	Spacewatch	·	1.0 km	MPC · JPL
806906	2017 BN_{49}	—	September 11, 2015	Haleakala	Pan-STARRS 1	·	1.1 km	MPC · JPL
806907	2017 BW_{52}	—	January 26, 2017	Mount Lemmon	Mount Lemmon Survey	·	1.6 km	MPC · JPL
806908	2017 BX_{53}	—	March 13, 2012	Mount Lemmon	Mount Lemmon Survey	·	1.9 km	MPC · JPL
806909	2017 BW_{63}	—	June 6, 2014	Haleakala	Pan-STARRS 1	PHO	730 m	MPC · JPL
806910	2017 BK_{66}	—	January 27, 2017	Mount Lemmon	Mount Lemmon Survey	·	850 m	MPC · JPL
806911	2017 BB_{71}	—	January 27, 2017	Haleakala	Pan-STARRS 1	·	1.6 km	MPC · JPL
806912	2017 BJ_{76}	—	January 5, 2017	Mount Lemmon	Mount Lemmon Survey	·	1.1 km	MPC · JPL
806913	2017 BN_{76}	—	January 27, 2017	Haleakala	Pan-STARRS 1	·	1.4 km	MPC · JPL
806914	2017 BG_{91}	—	December 9, 2016	Mount Lemmon	Mount Lemmon Survey	H	490 m	MPC · JPL
806915	2017 BU_{91}	—	February 24, 2012	Palomar Mountain	Palomar Transient Factory	H	480 m	MPC · JPL
806916	2017 BA_{93}	—	March 16, 2012	Haleakala	Pan-STARRS 1	H	470 m	MPC · JPL
806917	2017 BF_{99}	—	January 16, 2008	Kitt Peak	Spacewatch	AEO	800 m	MPC · JPL
806918	2017 BX_{104}	—	October 24, 2011	Haleakala	Pan-STARRS 1	·	1.2 km	MPC · JPL
806919	2017 BP_{107}	—	March 13, 2012	Mount Lemmon	Mount Lemmon Survey	·	2.1 km	MPC · JPL
806920	2017 BP_{112}	—	January 30, 2017	Haleakala	Pan-STARRS 1	·	1.2 km	MPC · JPL
806921	2017 BB_{116}	—	January 30, 2017	Haleakala	Pan-STARRS 1	EUN	850 m	MPC · JPL
806922	2017 BW_{117}	—	January 30, 2017	Haleakala	Pan-STARRS 1	·	1.9 km	MPC · JPL
806923	2017 BY_{124}	—	January 27, 2017	Haleakala	Pan-STARRS 1	H	450 m	MPC · JPL
806924	2017 BT_{135}	—	April 20, 2015	Haleakala	Pan-STARRS 1	H	440 m	MPC · JPL
806925	2017 BK_{141}	—	April 10, 2013	Haleakala	Pan-STARRS 1	EUN	810 m	MPC · JPL
806926	2017 BC_{146}	—	January 26, 2017	Haleakala	Pan-STARRS 1	·	1.0 km	MPC · JPL
806927	2017 BY_{146}	—	March 23, 2003	Kitt Peak	Spacewatch	·	1.5 km	MPC · JPL
806928	2017 BK_{147}	—	January 28, 2017	Haleakala	Pan-STARRS 1	·	990 m	MPC · JPL
806929	2017 BG_{148}	—	January 31, 2017	Haleakala	Pan-STARRS 1	·	740 m	MPC · JPL
806930	2017 BM_{150}	—	January 31, 2017	Haleakala	Pan-STARRS 1	·	840 m	MPC · JPL
806931	2017 BZ_{154}	—	January 28, 2017	Mount Lemmon	Mount Lemmon Survey	H	430 m	MPC · JPL
806932	2017 BX_{156}	—	January 26, 2017	Mount Lemmon	Mount Lemmon Survey	(5)	820 m	MPC · JPL
806933	2017 BY_{156}	—	January 28, 2017	Haleakala	Pan-STARRS 1	·	2.3 km	MPC · JPL
806934	2017 BG_{157}	—	January 28, 2017	Mount Lemmon	Mount Lemmon Survey	·	710 m	MPC · JPL
806935	2017 BR_{158}	—	January 30, 2017	Haleakala	Pan-STARRS 1	·	1.5 km	MPC · JPL
806936	2017 BA_{159}	—	January 30, 2017	Mount Lemmon	Mount Lemmon Survey	H	360 m	MPC · JPL
806937	2017 BD_{161}	—	January 26, 2017	Mount Lemmon	Mount Lemmon Survey	·	1.3 km	MPC · JPL
806938	2017 BZ_{163}	—	January 28, 2017	Haleakala	Pan-STARRS 1	L5	5.3 km	MPC · JPL
806939	2017 BX_{165}	—	January 28, 2017	Haleakala	Pan-STARRS 1	3:2	4.0 km	MPC · JPL
806940	2017 BN_{168}	—	January 27, 2017	Mount Lemmon	Mount Lemmon Survey	·	1.2 km	MPC · JPL
806941	2017 BU_{168}	—	January 29, 2017	Haleakala	Pan-STARRS 1	·	1.3 km	MPC · JPL
806942	2017 BW_{168}	—	January 19, 2017	Mount Lemmon	Mount Lemmon Survey	ADE	1.4 km	MPC · JPL
806943	2017 BF_{169}	—	January 30, 2017	Kitt Peak	Spacewatch	·	1.2 km	MPC · JPL
806944	2017 BZ_{170}	—	January 26, 2017	Haleakala	Pan-STARRS 1	·	640 m	MPC · JPL
806945	2017 BX_{174}	—	January 27, 2017	Haleakala	Pan-STARRS 1	·	810 m	MPC · JPL
806946	2017 BU_{176}	—	January 31, 2017	Mount Lemmon	Mount Lemmon Survey	·	1.1 km	MPC · JPL
806947	2017 BK_{177}	—	January 28, 2017	Mount Lemmon	Mount Lemmon Survey	·	840 m	MPC · JPL
806948	2017 BS_{177}	—	January 28, 2017	Haleakala	Pan-STARRS 1	KOR	830 m	MPC · JPL
806949	2017 BZ_{181}	—	January 29, 2017	Haleakala	Pan-STARRS 1	·	2.0 km	MPC · JPL
806950	2017 BE_{182}	—	January 28, 2017	Haleakala	Pan-STARRS 1	EOS	1.2 km	MPC · JPL
806951	2017 BW_{182}	—	January 28, 2017	Haleakala	Pan-STARRS 1	L5	5.7 km	MPC · JPL
806952	2017 BH_{188}	—	January 29, 2017	Haleakala	Pan-STARRS 1	·	1.4 km	MPC · JPL
806953	2017 BM_{188}	—	January 28, 2017	Haleakala	Pan-STARRS 1	THM	1.8 km	MPC · JPL
806954	2017 BK_{194}	—	January 26, 2017	Haleakala	Pan-STARRS 1	EOS	1.3 km	MPC · JPL
806955	2017 BV_{198}	—	January 27, 2017	Haleakala	Pan-STARRS 1	·	1.5 km	MPC · JPL
806956	2017 BU_{199}	—	January 26, 2017	Haleakala	Pan-STARRS 1	·	1.7 km	MPC · JPL
806957	2017 BH_{202}	—	January 4, 2017	Haleakala	Pan-STARRS 1	EOS	1.2 km	MPC · JPL
806958	2017 BX_{204}	—	January 27, 2017	Mount Lemmon	Mount Lemmon Survey	·	2.1 km	MPC · JPL
806959	2017 BM_{206}	—	January 26, 2017	Mount Lemmon	Mount Lemmon Survey	·	1.3 km	MPC · JPL
806960	2017 BS_{206}	—	September 9, 2015	Haleakala	Pan-STARRS 1	·	1.2 km	MPC · JPL
806961	2017 BX_{207}	—	January 20, 2017	Haleakala	Pan-STARRS 1	·	960 m	MPC · JPL
806962	2017 BX_{215}	—	January 7, 2017	Mount Lemmon	Mount Lemmon Survey	·	1.1 km	MPC · JPL
806963	2017 BB_{222}	—	October 13, 2015	Haleakala	Pan-STARRS 1	·	1.2 km	MPC · JPL
806964	2017 BW_{229}	—	January 23, 2017	Mauna Kea	COIAS	3:2	3.2 km	MPC · JPL
806965	2017 CA	—	November 10, 2016	Haleakala	Pan-STARRS 1	H	500 m	MPC · JPL
806966	2017 CX_{16}	—	February 23, 2001	Cerro Tololo	Deep Lens Survey	·	690 m	MPC · JPL
806967	2017 CG_{25}	—	October 12, 2015	Haleakala	Pan-STARRS 1	·	1.2 km	MPC · JPL
806968	2017 CT_{29}	—	July 25, 2014	Haleakala	Pan-STARRS 1	TRE	1.5 km	MPC · JPL
806969	2017 CM_{36}	—	February 1, 2017	Haleakala	Pan-STARRS 1	H	390 m	MPC · JPL
806970	2017 CK_{38}	—	February 4, 2017	Haleakala	Pan-STARRS 1	·	1.3 km	MPC · JPL
806971	2017 CU_{39}	—	February 3, 2017	Haleakala	Pan-STARRS 1	·	1.4 km	MPC · JPL
806972	2017 CF_{40}	—	February 2, 2017	Haleakala	Pan-STARRS 1	·	1.5 km	MPC · JPL
806973	2017 CA_{43}	—	February 1, 2017	Mount Lemmon	Mount Lemmon Survey	PHO	800 m	MPC · JPL
806974	2017 CM_{43}	—	February 2, 2017	Haleakala	Pan-STARRS 1	·	1.1 km	MPC · JPL
806975	2017 CE_{45}	—	July 30, 2014	Haleakala	Pan-STARRS 1	·	790 m	MPC · JPL
806976	2017 CK_{45}	—	October 26, 2011	Haleakala	Pan-STARRS 1	·	1.1 km	MPC · JPL
806977	2017 CY_{45}	—	January 29, 2017	Haleakala	Pan-STARRS 1	EOS	1.2 km	MPC · JPL
806978	2017 CG_{49}	—	February 1, 2017	Mount Lemmon	Mount Lemmon Survey	THM	1.5 km	MPC · JPL
806979	2017 CO_{49}	—	February 2, 2017	Haleakala	Pan-STARRS 1	·	1.4 km	MPC · JPL
806980	2017 CG_{50}	—	January 27, 2017	Haleakala	Pan-STARRS 1	·	1.0 km	MPC · JPL
806981	2017 CF_{55}	—	February 3, 2017	Mount Lemmon	Mount Lemmon Survey	·	800 m	MPC · JPL
806982	2017 CZ_{60}	—	February 3, 2017	Mount Lemmon	Mount Lemmon Survey	·	1.5 km	MPC · JPL
806983	2017 DB_{4}	—	January 26, 2017	Mount Lemmon	Mount Lemmon Survey	·	1.3 km	MPC · JPL
806984	2017 DJ_{8}	—	January 31, 2017	Haleakala	Pan-STARRS 1	·	960 m	MPC · JPL
806985	2017 DH_{10}	—	January 31, 2006	Kitt Peak	Spacewatch	·	2.2 km	MPC · JPL
806986	2017 DM_{15}	—	August 27, 2008	Charleston	R. Holmes, H. Devore	H	400 m	MPC · JPL
806987	2017 DO_{15}	—	January 20, 2017	Haleakala	Pan-STARRS 1	H	430 m	MPC · JPL
806988	2017 DD_{17}	—	February 14, 2013	Kitt Peak	Spacewatch	·	1.1 km	MPC · JPL
806989	2017 DF_{22}	—	June 27, 2014	Haleakala	Pan-STARRS 1	·	870 m	MPC · JPL
806990	2017 DJ_{22}	—	September 29, 2005	Catalina	CSS	H	500 m	MPC · JPL
806991	2017 DS_{26}	—	January 27, 2017	Haleakala	Pan-STARRS 1	·	2.8 km	MPC · JPL
806992	2017 DT_{26}	—	January 27, 2017	Haleakala	Pan-STARRS 1	·	860 m	MPC · JPL
806993	2017 DH_{27}	—	October 18, 2015	Westfield	International Astronomical Search Collaboration	·	1.2 km	MPC · JPL
806994	2017 DY_{30}	—	December 2, 2005	Kitt Peak	L. H. Wasserman, R. L. Millis	·	2.1 km	MPC · JPL
806995	2017 DY_{33}	—	November 8, 2016	Haleakala	Pan-STARRS 1	·	2.8 km	MPC · JPL
806996	2017 DF_{34}	—	September 14, 2007	Kitt Peak	Spacewatch	·	830 m	MPC · JPL
806997	2017 DH_{34}	—	March 24, 2012	Mayhill-ISON	L. Elenin	H	450 m	MPC · JPL
806998	2017 DB_{35}	—	June 21, 2010	Mount Lemmon	Mount Lemmon Survey	H	340 m	MPC · JPL
806999	2017 DP_{43}	—	March 30, 2012	Mount Lemmon	Mount Lemmon Survey	THM	1.8 km	MPC · JPL
807000	2017 DV_{43}	—	February 18, 2017	Haleakala	Pan-STARRS 1	·	1.1 km	MPC · JPL

back to top
