= List of minor planets: 753001–754000 =

The following is a partial list of minor planets, running from minor-planet number 753001 through 754000, inclusive. The primary data for this and other partial lists is based on JPL's "Small-Body Orbital Elements" and data available from the Minor Planet Center. Critical list information is also provided by the MPC, unless otherwise specified from Lowell Observatory. A detailed description of the table's columns and additional sources are given on the main page including a complete list of every page in this series, and a statistical break-up on the dynamical classification of minor planets.

Also see the summary list of all named bodies in numerical and alphabetical order, and the corresponding naming citations for the number range of this particular list. New namings may only be added to this list after official publication, as the preannouncement of names is condemned by the Working Group for Small Bodies Nomenclature of the International Astronomical Union.

Near-Earth obj.	MBA (inner)	MBA (outer)	Centaur
Mars-crosser	MBA (middle)	Jupiter trojan	Trans-Neptunian obj.
Unclassified

== 753001–753100 ==
Designation			Discovery			Properties		Ref
Permanent	Provisional	Named after	Date	Site	Discoverer(s)	Category	Diam.	Ref
753001	2015 UF_{77}	—	September 18, 2010	Mount Lemmon	Mount Lemmon Survey	·	1.7 km	MPC · JPL
753002	2015 UL_{77}	—	September 19, 2015	Haleakala	Pan-STARRS 1	·	2.4 km	MPC · JPL
753003	2015 UP_{77}	—	November 27, 1998	Kitt Peak	Spacewatch	·	1.2 km	MPC · JPL
753004	2015 UY_{77}	—	September 23, 2015	Haleakala	Pan-STARRS 1	·	1.8 km	MPC · JPL
753005	2015 UM_{78}	—	September 9, 2015	Haleakala	Pan-STARRS 1	·	1.2 km	MPC · JPL
753006	2015 UW_{79}	—	August 12, 2015	Haleakala	Pan-STARRS 1	·	1.7 km	MPC · JPL
753007	2015 UX_{82}	—	December 30, 2011	Catalina	CSS	·	1.8 km	MPC · JPL
753008	2015 UX_{86}	—	October 21, 2015	Haleakala	Pan-STARRS 1	·	1.4 km	MPC · JPL
753009	2015 UZ_{86}	—	October 21, 2015	Haleakala	Pan-STARRS 1	·	1.6 km	MPC · JPL
753010	2015 UB_{87}	—	April 10, 2013	Kitt Peak	Spacewatch	·	2.2 km	MPC · JPL
753011	2015 UR_{87}	—	September 29, 2009	Mount Lemmon	Mount Lemmon Survey	·	1.8 km	MPC · JPL
753012	2015 UA_{89}	—	August 13, 2010	Kitt Peak	Spacewatch	·	1.6 km	MPC · JPL
753013	2015 UD_{89}	—	October 21, 2015	Haleakala	Pan-STARRS 1	·	2.1 km	MPC · JPL
753014	2015 UH_{89}	—	October 21, 2015	Haleakala	Pan-STARRS 1	·	1.1 km	MPC · JPL
753015	2015 UZ_{89}	—	October 22, 2006	Kitt Peak	Spacewatch	·	1.7 km	MPC · JPL
753016	2015 UD_{90}	—	November 18, 2006	Kitt Peak	Spacewatch	·	1.7 km	MPC · JPL
753017	2015 UK_{90}	—	June 27, 2014	Haleakala	Pan-STARRS 1	EUN	1.2 km	MPC · JPL
753018	2015 UW_{90}	—	October 23, 2015	Haleakala	Pan-STARRS 1	·	1.9 km	MPC · JPL
753019	2015 UP_{97}	—	May 21, 2014	Haleakala	Pan-STARRS 1	·	720 m	MPC · JPL
753020	2015 VN	—	October 12, 2006	Palomar	NEAT	·	1.6 km	MPC · JPL
753021	2015 VS_{5}	—	April 4, 2014	Haleakala	Pan-STARRS 1	·	1.9 km	MPC · JPL
753022	2015 VV_{7}	—	November 24, 2011	Mount Lemmon	Mount Lemmon Survey	·	1.4 km	MPC · JPL
753023	2015 VR_{14}	—	November 9, 2007	Mount Lemmon	Mount Lemmon Survey	·	1.1 km	MPC · JPL
753024	2015 VF_{17}	—	October 23, 2011	Haleakala	Pan-STARRS 1	HNS	1 km	MPC · JPL
753025	2015 VJ_{17}	—	August 28, 2015	Haleakala	Pan-STARRS 1	GEF	1.3 km	MPC · JPL
753026	2015 VT_{17}	—	January 31, 2009	Mount Lemmon	Mount Lemmon Survey	·	1.4 km	MPC · JPL
753027	2015 VQ_{18}	—	May 4, 2014	Haleakala	Pan-STARRS 1	·	1.2 km	MPC · JPL
753028	2015 VB_{24}	—	September 23, 2004	Kitt Peak	Spacewatch	·	2.0 km	MPC · JPL
753029	2015 VC_{27}	—	November 17, 2006	Mount Lemmon	Mount Lemmon Survey	·	1.6 km	MPC · JPL
753030	2015 VN_{27}	—	September 9, 2015	Haleakala	Pan-STARRS 1	EUN	920 m	MPC · JPL
753031	2015 VA_{29}	—	March 16, 2007	Mount Lemmon	Mount Lemmon Survey	·	1.6 km	MPC · JPL
753032	2015 VK_{29}	—	November 1, 2015	Haleakala	Pan-STARRS 1	·	860 m	MPC · JPL
753033	2015 VJ_{32}	—	November 13, 2010	Kitt Peak	Spacewatch	EOS	1.5 km	MPC · JPL
753034	2015 VV_{32}	—	March 16, 2013	Kitt Peak	Spacewatch	HNS	1.0 km	MPC · JPL
753035	2015 VD_{37}	—	November 22, 2006	Kitt Peak	Spacewatch	·	1.6 km	MPC · JPL
753036	2015 VO_{37}	—	October 9, 2015	Haleakala	Pan-STARRS 1	·	1.0 km	MPC · JPL
753037	2015 VK_{38}	—	November 1, 2015	Haleakala	Pan-STARRS 1	·	1.4 km	MPC · JPL
753038	2015 VH_{42}	—	February 7, 2008	Mount Lemmon	Mount Lemmon Survey	·	1.5 km	MPC · JPL
753039	2015 VJ_{42}	—	August 12, 2001	Palomar	NEAT	·	2.1 km	MPC · JPL
753040	2015 VM_{42}	—	October 9, 2015	Haleakala	Pan-STARRS 1	BRG	990 m	MPC · JPL
753041	2015 VS_{44}	—	May 28, 2011	Mount Lemmon	Mount Lemmon Survey	·	810 m	MPC · JPL
753042	2015 VX_{49}	—	March 10, 2007	Mount Lemmon	Mount Lemmon Survey	·	950 m	MPC · JPL
753043	2015 VG_{51}	—	March 23, 2003	Apache Point	SDSS	·	1.9 km	MPC · JPL
753044	2015 VO_{56}	—	May 6, 2014	Haleakala	Pan-STARRS 1	·	1.4 km	MPC · JPL
753045	2015 VE_{57}	—	March 19, 2013	Haleakala	Pan-STARRS 1	·	1.1 km	MPC · JPL
753046	2015 VD_{58}	—	October 23, 2011	Mount Lemmon	Mount Lemmon Survey	EUN	1.1 km	MPC · JPL
753047	2015 VU_{61}	—	January 14, 2008	Kitt Peak	Spacewatch	·	1.6 km	MPC · JPL
753048	2015 VN_{62}	—	October 8, 2015	Mount Lemmon	Mount Lemmon Survey	·	1.2 km	MPC · JPL
753049	2015 VT_{62}	—	November 2, 2015	Haleakala	Pan-STARRS 1	·	1.9 km	MPC · JPL
753050	2015 VZ_{62}	—	December 26, 2011	Mount Lemmon	Mount Lemmon Survey	EUN	900 m	MPC · JPL
753051	2015 VC_{63}	—	October 10, 2015	Haleakala	Pan-STARRS 1	·	2.8 km	MPC · JPL
753052	2015 VT_{67}	—	November 3, 2015	Mount Lemmon	Mount Lemmon Survey	·	930 m	MPC · JPL
753053	2015 VK_{72}	—	May 7, 2014	Haleakala	Pan-STARRS 1	BRG	1.2 km	MPC · JPL
753054	2015 VA_{73}	—	October 19, 2011	Kitt Peak	Spacewatch	·	1.1 km	MPC · JPL
753055	2015 VX_{79}	—	November 3, 2010	Mount Lemmon	Mount Lemmon Survey	·	1.4 km	MPC · JPL
753056	2015 VC_{80}	—	November 6, 2015	Haleakala	Pan-STARRS 1	·	1.4 km	MPC · JPL
753057	2015 VD_{83}	—	September 2, 2010	Mount Lemmon	Mount Lemmon Survey	·	1.3 km	MPC · JPL
753058	2015 VG_{84}	—	March 10, 2008	Kitt Peak	Spacewatch	EOS	1.7 km	MPC · JPL
753059	2015 VN_{84}	—	October 8, 2005	Anderson Mesa	LONEOS	·	1.9 km	MPC · JPL
753060	2015 VK_{86}	—	October 12, 2015	Haleakala	Pan-STARRS 1	·	1.9 km	MPC · JPL
753061	2015 VX_{86}	—	October 12, 2015	Haleakala	Pan-STARRS 1	EUN	880 m	MPC · JPL
753062	2015 VL_{89}	—	March 6, 2013	Haleakala	Pan-STARRS 1	·	730 m	MPC · JPL
753063	2015 VV_{93}	—	October 25, 2015	Haleakala	Pan-STARRS 1	TIR	2.4 km	MPC · JPL
753064	2015 VD_{94}	—	August 12, 2010	Kitt Peak	Spacewatch	·	1.6 km	MPC · JPL
753065	2015 VH_{94}	—	July 25, 2015	Haleakala	Pan-STARRS 1	·	1.9 km	MPC · JPL
753066	2015 VJ_{94}	—	September 14, 2006	Catalina	CSS	·	1.2 km	MPC · JPL
753067	2015 VQ_{100}	—	April 28, 2012	Kitt Peak	Spacewatch	·	2.7 km	MPC · JPL
753068	2015 VN_{101}	—	November 16, 2006	Mount Lemmon	Mount Lemmon Survey	·	1.4 km	MPC · JPL
753069	2015 VN_{102}	—	September 25, 2006	Kitt Peak	Spacewatch	·	1.2 km	MPC · JPL
753070	2015 VV_{103}	—	October 30, 2010	Catalina	CSS	·	1.7 km	MPC · JPL
753071	2015 VQ_{104}	—	July 30, 2014	Haleakala	Pan-STARRS 1	·	2.0 km	MPC · JPL
753072	2015 VK_{106}	—	November 7, 2002	Kitt Peak	Deep Ecliptic Survey	·	1.7 km	MPC · JPL
753073	2015 VN_{106}	—	May 20, 2006	Anderson Mesa	LONEOS	·	1.4 km	MPC · JPL
753074	2015 VK_{107}	—	November 25, 2010	Mount Lemmon	Mount Lemmon Survey	·	1.7 km	MPC · JPL
753075	2015 VK_{108}	—	January 29, 2012	Mount Lemmon	Mount Lemmon Survey	GEF	1.0 km	MPC · JPL
753076	2015 VG_{111}	—	May 20, 2014	Haleakala	Pan-STARRS 1	·	1.3 km	MPC · JPL
753077	2015 VL_{111}	—	August 22, 2004	Kitt Peak	Spacewatch	·	2.0 km	MPC · JPL
753078	2015 VX_{113}	—	September 23, 2015	Haleakala	Pan-STARRS 1	·	1.4 km	MPC · JPL
753079	2015 VW_{114}	—	September 9, 2015	Haleakala	Pan-STARRS 1	NYS	980 m	MPC · JPL
753080	2015 VG_{115}	—	November 2, 2006	Catalina	CSS	·	2.1 km	MPC · JPL
753081	2015 VE_{117}	—	September 9, 2015	Haleakala	Pan-STARRS 1	·	1.2 km	MPC · JPL
753082	2015 VQ_{119}	—	October 13, 2006	Kitt Peak	Spacewatch	·	1.3 km	MPC · JPL
753083	2015 VP_{120}	—	September 18, 2006	Catalina	CSS	·	1.2 km	MPC · JPL
753084	2015 VD_{121}	—	November 5, 2010	Mount Lemmon	Mount Lemmon Survey	·	2.4 km	MPC · JPL
753085	2015 VO_{122}	—	October 23, 2006	Kitt Peak	Spacewatch	MRX	800 m	MPC · JPL
753086	2015 VU_{124}	—	November 22, 2006	Catalina	CSS	·	1.9 km	MPC · JPL
753087	2015 VE_{129}	—	June 8, 2011	Mount Lemmon	Mount Lemmon Survey	·	950 m	MPC · JPL
753088	2015 VD_{131}	—	November 17, 2006	Kitt Peak	Spacewatch	AEO	780 m	MPC · JPL
753089	2015 VM_{133}	—	May 3, 2014	Haleakala	Pan-STARRS 1	EUN	1.2 km	MPC · JPL
753090	2015 VL_{134}	—	June 24, 2014	Haleakala	Pan-STARRS 1	·	1.6 km	MPC · JPL
753091	2015 VD_{135}	—	October 5, 2002	Palomar	NEAT	·	1.1 km	MPC · JPL
753092	2015 VR_{135}	—	December 9, 2006	Kitt Peak	Spacewatch	·	1.6 km	MPC · JPL
753093	2015 VV_{136}	—	October 19, 2015	Haleakala	Pan-STARRS 1	·	1.6 km	MPC · JPL
753094	2015 VG_{137}	—	December 4, 2005	Mount Lemmon	Mount Lemmon Survey	·	2.2 km	MPC · JPL
753095	2015 VM_{138}	—	November 9, 2015	Wildberg	R. Apitzsch	EOS	1.4 km	MPC · JPL
753096	2015 VL_{139}	—	October 10, 2015	Haleakala	Pan-STARRS 1	·	1.5 km	MPC · JPL
753097	2015 VQ_{141}	—	September 23, 2015	Haleakala	Pan-STARRS 1	·	1.3 km	MPC · JPL
753098	2015 VG_{142}	—	November 16, 2006	Kitt Peak	Spacewatch	NEM	1.8 km	MPC · JPL
753099	2015 VL_{142}	—	July 26, 2015	Haleakala	Pan-STARRS 1	AMO +1km	1.7 km	MPC · JPL
753100	2015 VZ_{142}	—	December 10, 2002	Palomar	NEAT	EUN	1.2 km	MPC · JPL

== 753101–753200 ==
back to top

Designation			Discovery			Properties		Ref
Permanent	Provisional	Named after	Date	Site	Discoverer(s)	Category	Diam.	Ref
753101	2015 VH_{143}	—	November 29, 2005	Palomar	NEAT	·	1.9 km	MPC · JPL
753102	2015 VW_{144}	—	November 24, 2011	Haleakala	Pan-STARRS 1	·	1.3 km	MPC · JPL
753103	2015 VD_{145}	—	November 2, 2010	Kitt Peak	Spacewatch	·	1.7 km	MPC · JPL
753104	2015 VK_{145}	—	December 14, 2010	Mount Lemmon	Mount Lemmon Survey	TIR	2.7 km	MPC · JPL
753105	2015 VF_{148}	—	October 9, 2015	Haleakala	Pan-STARRS 1	·	1.3 km	MPC · JPL
753106	2015 VU_{148}	—	December 27, 2006	Mount Lemmon	Mount Lemmon Survey	·	1.5 km	MPC · JPL
753107	2015 VD_{150}	—	October 21, 2015	Haleakala	Pan-STARRS 1	·	2.0 km	MPC · JPL
753108	2015 VP_{150}	—	September 9, 2015	Haleakala	Pan-STARRS 1	·	1.2 km	MPC · JPL
753109	2015 VB_{154}	—	October 17, 2001	Kitt Peak	Spacewatch	·	2.0 km	MPC · JPL
753110	2015 VR_{155}	—	September 16, 2006	Anderson Mesa	LONEOS	·	1.2 km	MPC · JPL
753111	2015 VU_{155}	—	November 25, 2006	Kitt Peak	Spacewatch	GEF	1.0 km	MPC · JPL
753112	2015 VB_{158}	—	November 1, 2015	Mount Lemmon	Mount Lemmon Survey	HNS	1.1 km	MPC · JPL
753113	2015 VE_{158}	—	November 1, 2015	Haleakala	Pan-STARRS 1	·	1.7 km	MPC · JPL
753114	2015 VX_{159}	—	November 11, 2006	Kitt Peak	Spacewatch	·	1.4 km	MPC · JPL
753115	2015 VH_{160}	—	October 16, 2006	Kitt Peak	Spacewatch	·	1.3 km	MPC · JPL
753116	2015 VN_{160}	—	November 7, 2015	Mount Lemmon	Mount Lemmon Survey	EOS	1.6 km	MPC · JPL
753117	2015 VV_{161}	—	November 7, 2015	Mount Lemmon	Mount Lemmon Survey	·	910 m	MPC · JPL
753118	2015 VR_{188}	—	November 1, 2015	Mount Lemmon	Mount Lemmon Survey	·	2.6 km	MPC · JPL
753119	2015 VJ_{194}	—	November 1, 2015	Mount Lemmon	Mount Lemmon Survey	RAF	760 m	MPC · JPL
753120	2015 VK_{202}	—	November 7, 2015	Mount Lemmon	Mount Lemmon Survey	·	1.1 km	MPC · JPL
753121	2015 VJ_{207}	—	October 24, 2011	Haleakala	Pan-STARRS 1	·	780 m	MPC · JPL
753122	2015 VP_{211}	—	November 1, 2015	Mount Lemmon	Mount Lemmon Survey	TIN	670 m	MPC · JPL
753123	2015 WR	—	November 1, 2015	Kitt Peak	Spacewatch	·	1.6 km	MPC · JPL
753124	2015 WX_{2}	—	December 4, 2010	Mount Lemmon	Mount Lemmon Survey	·	1.5 km	MPC · JPL
753125	2015 WO_{4}	—	July 21, 2006	Mount Lemmon	Mount Lemmon Survey	·	1.2 km	MPC · JPL
753126	2015 WB_{8}	—	October 26, 2015	Haleakala	Pan-STARRS 1	·	860 m	MPC · JPL
753127	2015 WD_{9}	—	July 28, 2014	Haleakala	Pan-STARRS 1	·	1.4 km	MPC · JPL
753128	2015 WQ_{9}	—	September 19, 2015	Haleakala	Pan-STARRS 1	·	1.1 km	MPC · JPL
753129	2015 WD_{12}	—	August 25, 2004	Kitt Peak	Spacewatch	·	740 m	MPC · JPL
753130	2015 WP_{12}	—	September 19, 2014	Haleakala	Pan-STARRS 1	MAR	750 m	MPC · JPL
753131	2015 WH_{13}	—	November 30, 2015	Catalina	CSS	T_{j} (2.9) · APO +1km	1.4 km	MPC · JPL
753132	2015 WP_{13}	—	September 19, 2015	Haleakala	Pan-STARRS 1	·	2.2 km	MPC · JPL
753133	2015 WJ_{15}	—	April 2, 2013	Mount Lemmon	Mount Lemmon Survey	HNS	1.2 km	MPC · JPL
753134	2015 WC_{16}	—	August 12, 2010	Kitt Peak	Spacewatch	·	1.7 km	MPC · JPL
753135	2015 WF_{16}	—	December 27, 2011	Mount Lemmon	Mount Lemmon Survey	·	1.4 km	MPC · JPL
753136	2015 WW_{21}	—	October 9, 2010	Mount Lemmon	Mount Lemmon Survey	·	1.8 km	MPC · JPL
753137	2015 XF_{5}	—	October 21, 2006	Kitt Peak	Spacewatch	HNS	920 m	MPC · JPL
753138	2015 XM_{5}	—	July 8, 2014	Haleakala	Pan-STARRS 1	·	1.7 km	MPC · JPL
753139	2015 XE_{8}	—	September 19, 2015	Haleakala	Pan-STARRS 1	·	1.7 km	MPC · JPL
753140	2015 XX_{10}	—	July 26, 2014	Haleakala	Pan-STARRS 1	·	1.4 km	MPC · JPL
753141	2015 XM_{11}	—	July 26, 2015	Haleakala	Pan-STARRS 1	JUN	810 m	MPC · JPL
753142	2015 XE_{12}	—	May 10, 2014	Haleakala	Pan-STARRS 1	·	1.7 km	MPC · JPL
753143	2015 XG_{12}	—	February 12, 2004	Kitt Peak	Spacewatch	EUN	1.1 km	MPC · JPL
753144	2015 XO_{12}	—	October 9, 2004	Goodricke-Pigott	R. A. Tucker	H	580 m	MPC · JPL
753145	2015 XV_{14}	—	October 10, 2015	Haleakala	Pan-STARRS 1	·	1.3 km	MPC · JPL
753146	2015 XF_{15}	—	November 7, 2015	Haleakala	Pan-STARRS 1	·	880 m	MPC · JPL
753147	2015 XM_{17}	—	January 4, 2006	Kitt Peak	Spacewatch	·	2.0 km	MPC · JPL
753148	2015 XT_{18}	—	October 18, 2006	Kitt Peak	Spacewatch	·	1.2 km	MPC · JPL
753149	2015 XP_{19}	—	September 29, 2011	Mount Lemmon	Mount Lemmon Survey	·	1.0 km	MPC · JPL
753150	2015 XY_{19}	—	October 10, 2015	Haleakala	Pan-STARRS 1	GEF	900 m	MPC · JPL
753151	2015 XB_{21}	—	November 11, 2006	Catalina	CSS	·	1.5 km	MPC · JPL
753152	2015 XQ_{21}	—	November 18, 2015	Haleakala	Pan-STARRS 1	·	1.8 km	MPC · JPL
753153	2015 XV_{22}	—	October 22, 2005	Kitt Peak	Spacewatch	·	1.7 km	MPC · JPL
753154	2015 XK_{24}	—	July 25, 2014	Haleakala	Pan-STARRS 1	·	1.3 km	MPC · JPL
753155	2015 XN_{26}	—	May 22, 2014	Mount Lemmon	Mount Lemmon Survey	ADE	1.5 km	MPC · JPL
753156	2015 XR_{28}	—	October 24, 2015	Mount Lemmon	Mount Lemmon Survey	·	1.2 km	MPC · JPL
753157	2015 XJ_{29}	—	November 18, 2015	Haleakala	Pan-STARRS 1	MAR	700 m	MPC · JPL
753158	2015 XM_{29}	—	November 13, 2015	Kitt Peak	Spacewatch	·	1.1 km	MPC · JPL
753159	2015 XB_{32}	—	November 17, 2015	Haleakala	Pan-STARRS 1	·	1.5 km	MPC · JPL
753160	2015 XD_{39}	—	November 12, 2006	Mount Lemmon	Mount Lemmon Survey	·	1.7 km	MPC · JPL
753161	2015 XB_{48}	—	April 19, 2013	Haleakala	Pan-STARRS 1	·	1.6 km	MPC · JPL
753162	2015 XS_{51}	—	March 14, 2012	Haleakala	Pan-STARRS 1	·	1.9 km	MPC · JPL
753163	2015 XG_{52}	—	December 27, 2006	Mount Lemmon	Mount Lemmon Survey	·	1.4 km	MPC · JPL
753164	2015 XF_{53}	—	October 8, 2015	Haleakala	Pan-STARRS 1	·	2.0 km	MPC · JPL
753165	2015 XH_{53}	—	September 22, 2009	Kitt Peak	Spacewatch	TIR	2.1 km	MPC · JPL
753166	2015 XM_{57}	—	December 20, 2004	Mount Lemmon	Mount Lemmon Survey	·	2.6 km	MPC · JPL
753167	2015 XV_{60}	—	July 20, 2014	Tivoli	G. Lehmann, ~Knöfel, A.	·	1.5 km	MPC · JPL
753168	2015 XR_{62}	—	December 15, 2006	Kitt Peak	Spacewatch	·	1.7 km	MPC · JPL
753169	2015 XA_{63}	—	June 5, 2013	Mount Lemmon	Mount Lemmon Survey	ADE	1.5 km	MPC · JPL
753170	2015 XV_{63}	—	December 27, 2006	Kitt Peak	Spacewatch	·	1.6 km	MPC · JPL
753171	2015 XL_{64}	—	October 29, 2002	Kitt Peak	Spacewatch	EUN	1.1 km	MPC · JPL
753172	2015 XU_{65}	—	November 19, 2015	Mount Lemmon	Mount Lemmon Survey	·	1.8 km	MPC · JPL
753173	2015 XP_{67}	—	October 25, 2001	Apache Point	SDSS	·	1.3 km	MPC · JPL
753174	2015 XK_{70}	—	September 23, 2015	Haleakala	Pan-STARRS 1	EUN	870 m	MPC · JPL
753175	2015 XB_{72}	—	November 22, 2006	Catalina	CSS	EUN	1.2 km	MPC · JPL
753176	2015 XR_{77}	—	November 18, 2015	Haleakala	Pan-STARRS 1	EOS	1.3 km	MPC · JPL
753177	2015 XY_{77}	—	August 28, 2006	Kitt Peak	Spacewatch	·	1.2 km	MPC · JPL
753178	2015 XQ_{80}	—	January 25, 2011	Kitt Peak	Spacewatch	·	2.2 km	MPC · JPL
753179	2015 XD_{85}	—	October 8, 2015	Haleakala	Pan-STARRS 1	·	1.9 km	MPC · JPL
753180	2015 XF_{85}	—	December 3, 2015	Haleakala	Pan-STARRS 1	·	1.3 km	MPC · JPL
753181	2015 XB_{90}	—	November 26, 2011	Mount Lemmon	Mount Lemmon Survey	JUN	830 m	MPC · JPL
753182	2015 XF_{106}	—	December 4, 2015	Haleakala	Pan-STARRS 1	·	2.0 km	MPC · JPL
753183	2015 XN_{106}	—	October 8, 2015	Haleakala	Pan-STARRS 1	·	1.6 km	MPC · JPL
753184	2015 XF_{107}	—	April 13, 2012	Haleakala	Pan-STARRS 1	·	2.3 km	MPC · JPL
753185	2015 XO_{111}	—	September 30, 2010	Mount Lemmon	Mount Lemmon Survey	·	1.4 km	MPC · JPL
753186	2015 XA_{122}	—	August 28, 2014	Haleakala	Pan-STARRS 1	·	1.4 km	MPC · JPL
753187	2015 XX_{122}	—	June 22, 2010	Mount Lemmon	Mount Lemmon Survey	EUN	970 m	MPC · JPL
753188	2015 XY_{128}	—	May 14, 2012	Mount Lemmon	Mount Lemmon Survey	T_{j} (2.97)	3.2 km	MPC · JPL
753189	2015 XN_{132}	—	September 15, 2009	Kitt Peak	Spacewatch	THM	1.6 km	MPC · JPL
753190	2015 XZ_{135}	—	May 8, 2014	Haleakala	Pan-STARRS 1	·	940 m	MPC · JPL
753191	2015 XM_{137}	—	May 2, 2013	Mount Lemmon	Mount Lemmon Survey	EUN	1.2 km	MPC · JPL
753192	2015 XE_{143}	—	October 2, 2010	Kitt Peak	Spacewatch	·	1.3 km	MPC · JPL
753193	2015 XK_{143}	—	December 11, 2012	Mount Lemmon	Mount Lemmon Survey	·	940 m	MPC · JPL
753194	2015 XX_{145}	—	October 11, 2005	Kitt Peak	Spacewatch	KOR	900 m	MPC · JPL
753195	2015 XK_{146}	—	October 5, 2010	Westfield	R. Holmes	·	1.2 km	MPC · JPL
753196	2015 XS_{147}	—	January 2, 2009	Mount Lemmon	Mount Lemmon Survey	NYS	770 m	MPC · JPL
753197	2015 XJ_{149}	—	January 27, 2012	Mount Lemmon	Mount Lemmon Survey	·	1.6 km	MPC · JPL
753198	2015 XW_{150}	—	October 15, 2015	Mount Lemmon	Mount Lemmon Survey	·	1.1 km	MPC · JPL
753199	2015 XN_{151}	—	November 23, 2015	Mount Lemmon	Mount Lemmon Survey	·	1.4 km	MPC · JPL
753200	2015 XO_{151}	—	June 30, 2014	Haleakala	Pan-STARRS 1	BRA	970 m	MPC · JPL

== 753201–753300 ==
back to top

Designation			Discovery			Properties		Ref
Permanent	Provisional	Named after	Date	Site	Discoverer(s)	Category	Diam.	Ref
753201	2015 XE_{153}	—	December 4, 2015	Haleakala	Pan-STARRS 1	EUN	780 m	MPC · JPL
753202	2015 XS_{153}	—	October 24, 2015	Mount Lemmon	Mount Lemmon Survey	·	1.8 km	MPC · JPL
753203	2015 XX_{154}	—	September 17, 2006	Catalina	CSS	EUN	1.1 km	MPC · JPL
753204	2015 XA_{155}	—	January 11, 2008	Mount Lemmon	Mount Lemmon Survey	·	2.0 km	MPC · JPL
753205	2015 XD_{157}	—	May 24, 2014	Haleakala	Pan-STARRS 1	·	1.4 km	MPC · JPL
753206	2015 XT_{157}	—	June 24, 2014	Haleakala	Pan-STARRS 1	·	1.3 km	MPC · JPL
753207	2015 XZ_{158}	—	July 25, 2014	Haleakala	Pan-STARRS 1	·	1.8 km	MPC · JPL
753208	2015 XQ_{159}	—	August 25, 2003	Palomar	NEAT	·	3.6 km	MPC · JPL
753209	2015 XT_{159}	—	October 25, 2015	Haleakala	Pan-STARRS 1	·	1.2 km	MPC · JPL
753210	2015 XH_{162}	—	September 9, 2015	Haleakala	Pan-STARRS 1	JUN	830 m	MPC · JPL
753211	2015 XH_{163}	—	June 22, 2014	Mount Lemmon	Mount Lemmon Survey	·	1.2 km	MPC · JPL
753212	2015 XP_{163}	—	August 12, 2015	Haleakala	Pan-STARRS 1	·	1.9 km	MPC · JPL
753213	2015 XU_{163}	—	October 26, 2011	Haleakala	Pan-STARRS 1	·	1 km	MPC · JPL
753214	2015 XN_{164}	—	September 20, 2006	Catalina	CSS	ADE	1.6 km	MPC · JPL
753215	2015 XU_{164}	—	October 24, 2015	Haleakala	Pan-STARRS 1	·	1.4 km	MPC · JPL
753216	2015 XP_{168}	—	April 23, 2014	Catalina	CSS	H	610 m	MPC · JPL
753217	2015 XK_{172}	—	December 30, 2011	Kitt Peak	Spacewatch	·	1.3 km	MPC · JPL
753218	2015 XS_{178}	—	December 30, 2011	Mount Lemmon	Mount Lemmon Survey	·	1.3 km	MPC · JPL
753219	2015 XH_{182}	—	February 1, 2012	Mount Lemmon	Mount Lemmon Survey	·	1.8 km	MPC · JPL
753220	2015 XA_{184}	—	December 4, 2015	Haleakala	Pan-STARRS 1	·	2.9 km	MPC · JPL
753221	2015 XO_{185}	—	February 27, 2012	Haleakala	Pan-STARRS 1	·	1.4 km	MPC · JPL
753222	2015 XC_{186}	—	December 5, 2015	Haleakala	Pan-STARRS 1	·	1.3 km	MPC · JPL
753223	2015 XN_{188}	—	September 13, 2004	Kitt Peak	Spacewatch	·	850 m	MPC · JPL
753224	2015 XX_{189}	—	September 24, 2011	Haleakala	Pan-STARRS 1	KRM	1.6 km	MPC · JPL
753225	2015 XA_{190}	—	May 4, 2014	Haleakala	Pan-STARRS 1	ADE	1.5 km	MPC · JPL
753226	2015 XQ_{197}	—	December 6, 2015	Mount Lemmon	Mount Lemmon Survey	·	1.6 km	MPC · JPL
753227	2015 XP_{199}	—	November 7, 2015	Mount Lemmon	Mount Lemmon Survey	·	2.4 km	MPC · JPL
753228	2015 XX_{200}	—	November 9, 2015	Mount Lemmon	Mount Lemmon Survey	THM	1.7 km	MPC · JPL
753229	2015 XA_{201}	—	November 22, 2015	Mount Lemmon	Mount Lemmon Survey	·	1.3 km	MPC · JPL
753230	2015 XJ_{201}	—	November 19, 2006	Kitt Peak	Spacewatch	·	1.4 km	MPC · JPL
753231	2015 XB_{202}	—	January 18, 2012	Catalina	CSS	·	1.2 km	MPC · JPL
753232	2015 XD_{203}	—	September 19, 2015	Haleakala	Pan-STARRS 1	·	1.3 km	MPC · JPL
753233	2015 XQ_{203}	—	July 31, 2014	Haleakala	Pan-STARRS 1	·	1.7 km	MPC · JPL
753234	2015 XZ_{208}	—	May 31, 2014	Haleakala	Pan-STARRS 1	·	2.3 km	MPC · JPL
753235	2015 XU_{213}	—	February 27, 2012	Haleakala	Pan-STARRS 1	·	1.5 km	MPC · JPL
753236	2015 XR_{224}	—	November 22, 2015	Mount Lemmon	Mount Lemmon Survey	·	1.6 km	MPC · JPL
753237	2015 XZ_{224}	—	November 28, 2006	Kitt Peak	Spacewatch	AEO	940 m	MPC · JPL
753238	2015 XA_{240}	—	November 22, 2015	Mount Lemmon	Mount Lemmon Survey	·	1.4 km	MPC · JPL
753239	2015 XZ_{241}	—	October 31, 2010	Mount Lemmon	Mount Lemmon Survey	·	1.5 km	MPC · JPL
753240	2015 XC_{244}	—	October 24, 2015	Mount Lemmon	Mount Lemmon Survey	·	1.4 km	MPC · JPL
753241	2015 XV_{244}	—	December 6, 2015	Haleakala	Pan-STARRS 1	·	1.6 km	MPC · JPL
753242	2015 XK_{262}	—	November 23, 2011	Mayhill-ISON	L. Elenin	·	1.1 km	MPC · JPL
753243	2015 XO_{265}	—	November 22, 2015	Mount Lemmon	Mount Lemmon Survey	L5	8.8 km	MPC · JPL
753244	2015 XP_{270}	—	September 19, 2015	Haleakala	Pan-STARRS 1	·	800 m	MPC · JPL
753245	2015 XG_{272}	—	September 21, 2009	Kitt Peak	Spacewatch	·	2.0 km	MPC · JPL
753246	2015 XO_{274}	—	December 6, 2015	Mount Lemmon	Mount Lemmon Survey	·	860 m	MPC · JPL
753247	2015 XH_{278}	—	November 10, 2015	Mount Lemmon	Mount Lemmon Survey	·	1.5 km	MPC · JPL
753248	2015 XE_{288}	—	November 22, 2015	Mount Lemmon	Mount Lemmon Survey	·	1.9 km	MPC · JPL
753249	2015 XV_{293}	—	July 27, 2011	Haleakala	Pan-STARRS 1	NYS	690 m	MPC · JPL
753250	2015 XB_{300}	—	December 4, 2015	Mount Lemmon	Mount Lemmon Survey	AGN	960 m	MPC · JPL
753251	2015 XX_{307}	—	March 29, 2000	Kitt Peak	Spacewatch	·	1.8 km	MPC · JPL
753252	2015 XO_{308}	—	September 9, 2015	Haleakala	Pan-STARRS 1	·	1.8 km	MPC · JPL
753253	2015 XA_{309}	—	July 24, 2015	Haleakala	Pan-STARRS 1	·	2.6 km	MPC · JPL
753254	2015 XK_{309}	—	December 29, 2008	Kitt Peak	Spacewatch	·	680 m	MPC · JPL
753255	2015 XE_{310}	—	July 1, 2014	Mount Lemmon	Mount Lemmon Survey	·	1.1 km	MPC · JPL
753256	2015 XY_{315}	—	October 3, 2010	Kitt Peak	Spacewatch	·	1.3 km	MPC · JPL
753257	2015 XE_{318}	—	December 4, 2015	Mount Lemmon	Mount Lemmon Survey	·	740 m	MPC · JPL
753258	2015 XL_{331}	—	May 8, 2014	Haleakala	Pan-STARRS 1	·	1.1 km	MPC · JPL
753259	2015 XT_{333}	—	December 8, 2015	Haleakala	Pan-STARRS 1	·	590 m	MPC · JPL
753260	2015 XB_{335}	—	September 1, 2014	Mount Lemmon	Mount Lemmon Survey	·	2.2 km	MPC · JPL
753261	2015 XS_{339}	—	December 6, 2015	Haleakala	Pan-STARRS 1	ELF	2.9 km	MPC · JPL
753262	2015 XD_{346}	—	February 26, 2012	Haleakala	Pan-STARRS 1	·	1.3 km	MPC · JPL
753263	2015 XE_{346}	—	August 23, 2014	Haleakala	Pan-STARRS 1	·	2.4 km	MPC · JPL
753264	2015 XD_{349}	—	November 11, 2010	Mount Lemmon	Mount Lemmon Survey	·	1.4 km	MPC · JPL
753265	2015 XS_{349}	—	December 19, 2004	Mount Lemmon	Mount Lemmon Survey	·	2.9 km	MPC · JPL
753266	2015 XD_{352}	—	November 17, 1996	Kitt Peak	Spacewatch	·	560 m	MPC · JPL
753267	2015 XM_{354}	—	May 7, 2014	Haleakala	Pan-STARRS 1	·	1.3 km	MPC · JPL
753268	2015 XW_{357}	—	July 1, 2014	Haleakala	Pan-STARRS 1	·	1.3 km	MPC · JPL
753269	2015 XY_{357}	—	November 2, 2015	Haleakala	Pan-STARRS 1	·	1.9 km	MPC · JPL
753270	2015 XQ_{362}	—	July 1, 2014	Haleakala	Pan-STARRS 1	·	2.8 km	MPC · JPL
753271	2015 XX_{363}	—	June 3, 2014	Haleakala	Pan-STARRS 1	TIN	1.3 km	MPC · JPL
753272	2015 XU_{365}	—	December 15, 2004	Kitt Peak	Spacewatch	·	2.1 km	MPC · JPL
753273	2015 XD_{366}	—	December 12, 2015	Haleakala	Pan-STARRS 1	·	1.7 km	MPC · JPL
753274	2015 XK_{366}	—	December 12, 2015	Haleakala	Pan-STARRS 1	·	1.9 km	MPC · JPL
753275	2015 XD_{374}	—	December 8, 2015	Mount Lemmon	Mount Lemmon Survey	·	680 m	MPC · JPL
753276	2015 XF_{380}	—	December 1, 2015	Haleakala	Pan-STARRS 1	·	1.3 km	MPC · JPL
753277	2015 XH_{381}	—	October 8, 2015	Haleakala	Pan-STARRS 1	·	1.4 km	MPC · JPL
753278	2015 XQ_{383}	—	November 8, 2015	Tenerife	ESA OGS	·	2.5 km	MPC · JPL
753279	2015 XB_{392}	—	December 9, 2015	Haleakala	Pan-STARRS 1	·	2.1 km	MPC · JPL
753280	2015 XF_{393}	—	December 13, 2015	Haleakala	Pan-STARRS 1	·	2.1 km	MPC · JPL
753281	2015 XS_{394}	—	October 2, 2014	Haleakala	Pan-STARRS 1	·	2.2 km	MPC · JPL
753282	2015 XU_{395}	—	December 5, 2015	Haleakala	Pan-STARRS 1	·	1.2 km	MPC · JPL
753283	2015 XX_{396}	—	October 21, 2011	Mount Lemmon	Mount Lemmon Survey	·	1.1 km	MPC · JPL
753284	2015 XM_{398}	—	January 27, 2003	Socorro	LINEAR	·	1.2 km	MPC · JPL
753285	2015 XU_{398}	—	December 13, 2015	Haleakala	Pan-STARRS 1	BRA	1.3 km	MPC · JPL
753286	2015 XE_{400}	—	December 13, 2015	Haleakala	Pan-STARRS 1	·	2.0 km	MPC · JPL
753287	2015 XO_{400}	—	October 8, 2004	Kitt Peak	Spacewatch	·	1.6 km	MPC · JPL
753288	2015 XS_{400}	—	October 16, 2009	Mount Lemmon	Mount Lemmon Survey	HYG	2.2 km	MPC · JPL
753289	2015 XS_{401}	—	December 8, 2015	Haleakala	Pan-STARRS 1	·	1.2 km	MPC · JPL
753290	2015 XJ_{402}	—	November 16, 2014	Mount Lemmon	Mount Lemmon Survey	·	1.8 km	MPC · JPL
753291	2015 XS_{402}	—	October 2, 2014	Catalina	CSS	·	2.4 km	MPC · JPL
753292	2015 XL_{403}	—	November 11, 2009	Kitt Peak	Spacewatch	EOS	1.4 km	MPC · JPL
753293	2015 XJ_{404}	—	December 1, 2015	Haleakala	Pan-STARRS 1	EOS	1.5 km	MPC · JPL
753294	2015 XL_{405}	—	June 18, 2013	Haleakala	Pan-STARRS 1	BRA	1.3 km	MPC · JPL
753295	2015 XW_{405}	—	December 4, 2015	Haleakala	Pan-STARRS 1	EUN	1.1 km	MPC · JPL
753296	2015 XN_{406}	—	July 25, 2014	Haleakala	Pan-STARRS 1	BRA	1.1 km	MPC · JPL
753297	2015 XP_{406}	—	December 4, 2015	Haleakala	Pan-STARRS 1	·	2.0 km	MPC · JPL
753298	2015 XC_{408}	—	August 3, 2014	Haleakala	Pan-STARRS 1	·	2.3 km	MPC · JPL
753299	2015 XA_{410}	—	March 25, 2012	Mount Lemmon	Mount Lemmon Survey	·	1.7 km	MPC · JPL
753300	2015 XN_{411}	—	December 30, 2007	Kitt Peak	Spacewatch	HNS	900 m	MPC · JPL

== 753301–753400 ==
back to top

Designation			Discovery			Properties		Ref
Permanent	Provisional	Named after	Date	Site	Discoverer(s)	Category	Diam.	Ref
753301	2015 XQ_{411}	—	December 8, 2015	Haleakala	Pan-STARRS 1	·	1.3 km	MPC · JPL
753302	2015 XH_{413}	—	September 26, 2011	Haleakala	Pan-STARRS 1	·	820 m	MPC · JPL
753303	2015 XM_{414}	—	December 9, 2015	Haleakala	Pan-STARRS 1	·	1.7 km	MPC · JPL
753304	2015 XF_{415}	—	September 21, 2009	Kitt Peak	Spacewatch	·	1.4 km	MPC · JPL
753305	2015 XJ_{415}	—	December 1, 2014	Haleakala	Pan-STARRS 1	EOS	1.7 km	MPC · JPL
753306	2015 XU_{415}	—	August 30, 2014	Mount Lemmon	Mount Lemmon Survey	EUN	1.1 km	MPC · JPL
753307	2015 XC_{416}	—	July 15, 2013	Haleakala	Pan-STARRS 1	EUN	1.1 km	MPC · JPL
753308	2015 XJ_{416}	—	December 12, 2015	Haleakala	Pan-STARRS 1	EUN	980 m	MPC · JPL
753309	2015 XM_{416}	—	December 12, 2015	Haleakala	Pan-STARRS 1	HNS	1.2 km	MPC · JPL
753310	2015 XG_{419}	—	July 15, 2013	Haleakala	Pan-STARRS 1	·	2.1 km	MPC · JPL
753311	2015 XQ_{419}	—	September 13, 2013	Mount Lemmon	Mount Lemmon Survey	EOS	1.6 km	MPC · JPL
753312	2015 XY_{421}	—	May 6, 2006	Mount Lemmon	Mount Lemmon Survey	EUP	2.8 km	MPC · JPL
753313	2015 XF_{427}	—	October 22, 2006	Mount Lemmon	Mount Lemmon Survey	·	1.3 km	MPC · JPL
753314	2015 XT_{427}	—	January 1, 2008	Mount Lemmon	Mount Lemmon Survey	·	1.4 km	MPC · JPL
753315	2015 XV_{429}	—	November 6, 2005	Mount Lemmon	Mount Lemmon Survey	·	1.4 km	MPC · JPL
753316	2015 XA_{508}	—	December 5, 2015	Haleakala	Pan-STARRS 1	·	1.3 km	MPC · JPL
753317	2015 YW_{12}	—	October 26, 1995	Kitt Peak	Spacewatch	·	1.7 km	MPC · JPL
753318	2015 YX_{12}	—	January 19, 2012	Haleakala	Pan-STARRS 1	·	1.5 km	MPC · JPL
753319	2015 YR_{13}	—	July 28, 2014	Haleakala	Pan-STARRS 1	·	2.1 km	MPC · JPL
753320	2015 YJ_{14}	—	February 25, 2011	Kitt Peak	Spacewatch	·	2.1 km	MPC · JPL
753321	2015 YO_{14}	—	January 1, 2012	Mount Lemmon	Mount Lemmon Survey	·	1.3 km	MPC · JPL
753322	2015 YV_{17}	—	October 22, 2003	Kitt Peak	Spacewatch	·	3.0 km	MPC · JPL
753323	2015 YG_{18}	—	December 22, 2008	Mount Lemmon	Mount Lemmon Survey	·	610 m	MPC · JPL
753324	2015 YL_{23}	—	September 19, 2014	Haleakala	Pan-STARRS 1	·	1.8 km	MPC · JPL
753325	2015 YL_{24}	—	November 17, 2009	Kitt Peak	Spacewatch	·	2.5 km	MPC · JPL
753326	2015 YF_{26}	—	August 28, 2014	Haleakala	Pan-STARRS 1	·	2.7 km	MPC · JPL
753327	2015 YV_{26}	—	January 24, 2011	Mount Lemmon	Mount Lemmon Survey	·	2.1 km	MPC · JPL
753328	2015 YX_{26}	—	January 13, 2011	Kitt Peak	Spacewatch	·	1.4 km	MPC · JPL
753329	2015 YP_{27}	—	November 12, 2010	Mount Lemmon	Mount Lemmon Survey	·	1.9 km	MPC · JPL
753330	2015 YB_{31}	—	December 18, 2015	Kitt Peak	Spacewatch	·	1.6 km	MPC · JPL
753331	2015 YA_{34}	—	December 21, 2015	Mount Lemmon	Mount Lemmon Survey	L5	6.4 km	MPC · JPL
753332	2016 AF	—	November 6, 2015	Mount Lemmon	Mount Lemmon Survey	·	2.1 km	MPC · JPL
753333	2016 AH	—	November 22, 2015	Mount Lemmon	Mount Lemmon Survey	·	3.5 km	MPC · JPL
753334	2016 AJ	—	September 3, 2010	Mount Lemmon	Mount Lemmon Survey	·	1.5 km	MPC · JPL
753335	2016 AH_{3}	—	September 18, 2010	Mount Lemmon	Mount Lemmon Survey	·	1.6 km	MPC · JPL
753336	2016 AQ_{6}	—	August 29, 2014	Mount Lemmon	Mount Lemmon Survey	·	2.6 km	MPC · JPL
753337	2016 AR_{7}	—	August 29, 2014	Haleakala	Pan-STARRS 1	·	3.3 km	MPC · JPL
753338	2016 AY_{13}	—	December 24, 2006	Kitt Peak	Spacewatch	GEF	960 m	MPC · JPL
753339	2016 AS_{15}	—	January 30, 2011	Mount Lemmon	Mount Lemmon Survey	EOS	1.6 km	MPC · JPL
753340	2016 AW_{16}	—	August 31, 2014	Haleakala	Pan-STARRS 1	KOR	1.1 km	MPC · JPL
753341	2016 AW_{18}	—	July 14, 2013	Haleakala	Pan-STARRS 1	·	2.0 km	MPC · JPL
753342	2016 AG_{21}	—	December 3, 2015	Mount Lemmon	Mount Lemmon Survey	EOS	1.6 km	MPC · JPL
753343	2016 AH_{23}	—	March 13, 2013	Mount Lemmon	Mount Lemmon Survey	·	490 m	MPC · JPL
753344	2016 AA_{28}	—	December 30, 2015	Mount Lemmon	Mount Lemmon Survey	AGN	890 m	MPC · JPL
753345	2016 AF_{28}	—	December 30, 2015	Mount Lemmon	Mount Lemmon Survey	·	1.7 km	MPC · JPL
753346	2016 AC_{29}	—	September 22, 2011	Kitt Peak	Spacewatch	·	780 m	MPC · JPL
753347	2016 AN_{29}	—	December 3, 2010	Mount Lemmon	Mount Lemmon Survey	·	1.6 km	MPC · JPL
753348	2016 AL_{32}	—	September 19, 2014	Haleakala	Pan-STARRS 1	·	2.0 km	MPC · JPL
753349	2016 AB_{33}	—	December 3, 2015	Mount Lemmon	Mount Lemmon Survey	·	1.9 km	MPC · JPL
753350	2016 AL_{34}	—	April 19, 2013	Haleakala	Pan-STARRS 1	·	1.7 km	MPC · JPL
753351	2016 AL_{35}	—	January 3, 2016	Mount Lemmon	Mount Lemmon Survey	·	2.5 km	MPC · JPL
753352	2016 AS_{37}	—	October 13, 2010	Mount Lemmon	Mount Lemmon Survey	·	1.7 km	MPC · JPL
753353	2016 AN_{42}	—	July 13, 2013	Haleakala	Pan-STARRS 1	·	1.8 km	MPC · JPL
753354	2016 AG_{46}	—	November 13, 2015	Mount Lemmon	Mount Lemmon Survey	·	2.4 km	MPC · JPL
753355	2016 AO_{46}	—	February 12, 2011	Mount Lemmon	Mount Lemmon Survey	·	2.2 km	MPC · JPL
753356	2016 AZ_{47}	—	September 24, 2014	Kitt Peak	Spacewatch	KOR	1.2 km	MPC · JPL
753357	2016 AE_{48}	—	February 6, 2013	Kitt Peak	Spacewatch	·	500 m	MPC · JPL
753358	2016 AP_{48}	—	August 20, 2014	Haleakala	Pan-STARRS 1	·	1.4 km	MPC · JPL
753359	2016 AB_{49}	—	October 29, 2010	Mount Lemmon	Mount Lemmon Survey	·	1.3 km	MPC · JPL
753360	2016 AM_{51}	—	August 25, 2004	Kitt Peak	Spacewatch	·	1.6 km	MPC · JPL
753361	2016 AG_{52}	—	November 25, 2009	Kitt Peak	Spacewatch	THM	1.5 km	MPC · JPL
753362	2016 AS_{52}	—	October 28, 2013	Mount Lemmon	Mount Lemmon Survey	L5	6.7 km	MPC · JPL
753363	2016 AN_{58}	—	September 13, 2014	Haleakala	Pan-STARRS 1	·	2.0 km	MPC · JPL
753364	2016 AD_{60}	—	August 25, 2014	Haleakala	Pan-STARRS 1	HOF	2.3 km	MPC · JPL
753365	2016 AS_{60}	—	December 2, 2010	Mount Lemmon	Mount Lemmon Survey	·	1.9 km	MPC · JPL
753366	2016 AF_{63}	—	November 18, 2009	Kitt Peak	Spacewatch	·	2.1 km	MPC · JPL
753367	2016 AS_{64}	—	August 22, 2006	Palomar	NEAT	·	1.4 km	MPC · JPL
753368	2016 AF_{67}	—	August 27, 2011	Zelenchukskaya Stn	T. V. Krjačko, Satovski, B.	L5	8.4 km	MPC · JPL
753369	2016 AY_{67}	—	January 28, 2000	Kitt Peak	Spacewatch	·	1.9 km	MPC · JPL
753370	2016 AJ_{70}	—	January 29, 2011	Kitt Peak	Spacewatch	·	2.2 km	MPC · JPL
753371	2016 AN_{70}	—	September 29, 2011	Mount Lemmon	Mount Lemmon Survey	·	550 m	MPC · JPL
753372	2016 AD_{71}	—	December 25, 2010	Mount Lemmon	Mount Lemmon Survey	·	2.0 km	MPC · JPL
753373	2016 AG_{71}	—	January 10, 2007	Mount Lemmon	Mount Lemmon Survey	·	1.6 km	MPC · JPL
753374	2016 AY_{72}	—	December 9, 2015	Haleakala	Pan-STARRS 1	·	1.5 km	MPC · JPL
753375	2016 AD_{74}	—	October 1, 2014	Haleakala	Pan-STARRS 1	·	1.5 km	MPC · JPL
753376	2016 AL_{74}	—	October 30, 2014	Haleakala	Pan-STARRS 1	·	2.1 km	MPC · JPL
753377	2016 AO_{74}	—	December 14, 1999	Kitt Peak	Spacewatch	·	2.1 km	MPC · JPL
753378	2016 AC_{75}	—	January 13, 1999	Kitt Peak	Spacewatch	·	2.9 km	MPC · JPL
753379	2016 AP_{77}	—	February 16, 2004	Kitt Peak	Spacewatch	·	960 m	MPC · JPL
753380	2016 AB_{82}	—	January 28, 2011	Mount Lemmon	Mount Lemmon Survey	·	1.8 km	MPC · JPL
753381	2016 AL_{85}	—	June 30, 2014	Haleakala	Pan-STARRS 1	·	2.5 km	MPC · JPL
753382	2016 AE_{86}	—	December 8, 2015	Mount Lemmon	Mount Lemmon Survey	·	1.8 km	MPC · JPL
753383	2016 AP_{86}	—	August 3, 2014	Haleakala	Pan-STARRS 1	·	2.0 km	MPC · JPL
753384	2016 AK_{87}	—	December 16, 2015	Mount Lemmon	Mount Lemmon Survey	·	1.5 km	MPC · JPL
753385	2016 AH_{88}	—	June 19, 2010	Mount Lemmon	Mount Lemmon Survey	·	1.0 km	MPC · JPL
753386	2016 AP_{89}	—	October 10, 2010	Kitt Peak	Spacewatch	WIT	830 m	MPC · JPL
753387	2016 AH_{92}	—	November 18, 2011	Mount Lemmon	Mount Lemmon Survey	EUN	1.1 km	MPC · JPL
753388	2016 AC_{93}	—	January 7, 2016	Haleakala	Pan-STARRS 1	EOS	1.5 km	MPC · JPL
753389	2016 AE_{96}	—	April 1, 2012	Mount Lemmon	Mount Lemmon Survey	·	1.8 km	MPC · JPL
753390	2016 AL_{99}	—	January 7, 2016	Haleakala	Pan-STARRS 1	EOS	1.5 km	MPC · JPL
753391	2016 AW_{99}	—	August 9, 2013	Haleakala	Pan-STARRS 1	·	2.2 km	MPC · JPL
753392	2016 AJ_{100}	—	September 3, 2013	Haleakala	Pan-STARRS 1	·	1.9 km	MPC · JPL
753393	2016 AU_{101}	—	April 5, 2010	Kitt Peak	Spacewatch	·	530 m	MPC · JPL
753394	2016 AA_{103}	—	October 25, 2014	Haleakala	Pan-STARRS 1	·	1.6 km	MPC · JPL
753395	2016 AJ_{103}	—	January 7, 2016	Haleakala	Pan-STARRS 1	·	1.2 km	MPC · JPL
753396	2016 AS_{113}	—	January 7, 2016	Haleakala	Pan-STARRS 1	·	2.7 km	MPC · JPL
753397	2016 AS_{117}	—	January 30, 2011	Haleakala	Pan-STARRS 1	EOS	1.3 km	MPC · JPL
753398	2016 AX_{119}	—	July 12, 2013	Haleakala	Pan-STARRS 1	·	1.6 km	MPC · JPL
753399	2016 AC_{122}	—	February 27, 2012	Haleakala	Pan-STARRS 1	·	1.4 km	MPC · JPL
753400	2016 AO_{122}	—	February 7, 1999	Kitt Peak	Spacewatch	·	2.8 km	MPC · JPL

== 753401–753500 ==
back to top

Designation			Discovery			Properties		Ref
Permanent	Provisional	Named after	Date	Site	Discoverer(s)	Category	Diam.	Ref
753401	2016 AO_{123}	—	January 8, 2016	Haleakala	Pan-STARRS 1	H	410 m	MPC · JPL
753402	2016 AM_{124}	—	August 20, 2014	Haleakala	Pan-STARRS 1	·	1.2 km	MPC · JPL
753403	2016 AL_{126}	—	January 8, 2016	Haleakala	Pan-STARRS 1	·	540 m	MPC · JPL
753404	2016 AA_{129}	—	January 8, 2016	Haleakala	Pan-STARRS 1	PHO	810 m	MPC · JPL
753405	2016 AD_{130}	—	January 8, 2016	Haleakala	Pan-STARRS 1	DOR	1.9 km	MPC · JPL
753406	2016 AD_{133}	—	January 9, 2016	Haleakala	Pan-STARRS 1	·	2.1 km	MPC · JPL
753407	2016 AS_{133}	—	November 11, 2010	Catalina	CSS	·	2.4 km	MPC · JPL
753408	2016 AB_{136}	—	August 3, 2002	Palomar	NEAT	TIR	2.7 km	MPC · JPL
753409	2016 AA_{137}	—	October 23, 2014	Mount Lemmon	Mount Lemmon Survey	·	2.8 km	MPC · JPL
753410	2016 AK_{137}	—	November 17, 2014	Haleakala	Pan-STARRS 1	·	3.3 km	MPC · JPL
753411	2016 AY_{137}	—	October 1, 2014	Haleakala	Pan-STARRS 1	·	1.8 km	MPC · JPL
753412	2016 AQ_{138}	—	September 13, 2014	Haleakala	Pan-STARRS 1	·	2.0 km	MPC · JPL
753413	2016 AK_{139}	—	September 25, 2009	Kitt Peak	Spacewatch	·	1.6 km	MPC · JPL
753414	2016 AS_{140}	—	September 25, 2014	Kitt Peak	Spacewatch	·	2.4 km	MPC · JPL
753415	2016 AV_{143}	—	October 3, 2014	Kitt Peak	Spacewatch	·	2.3 km	MPC · JPL
753416	2016 AK_{147}	—	November 17, 2014	Mount Lemmon	Mount Lemmon Survey	EOS	1.5 km	MPC · JPL
753417	2016 AS_{157}	—	January 11, 2016	Haleakala	Pan-STARRS 1	·	2.8 km	MPC · JPL
753418	2016 AA_{160}	—	January 11, 2016	Haleakala	Pan-STARRS 1	EOS	1.3 km	MPC · JPL
753419	2016 AK_{166}	—	October 30, 2010	Mount Lemmon	Mount Lemmon Survey	·	2.0 km	MPC · JPL
753420	2016 AY_{168}	—	November 20, 2003	Kitt Peak	Deep Ecliptic Survey	·	2.1 km	MPC · JPL
753421	2016 AN_{170}	—	March 30, 2011	Mount Lemmon	Mount Lemmon Survey	·	2.1 km	MPC · JPL
753422	2016 AH_{173}	—	January 10, 2016	Haleakala	Pan-STARRS 1	·	1.9 km	MPC · JPL
753423	2016 AH_{176}	—	March 23, 2012	Mount Lemmon	Mount Lemmon Survey	·	1.6 km	MPC · JPL
753424	2016 AZ_{176}	—	September 18, 2010	Mount Lemmon	Mount Lemmon Survey	ADE	1.7 km	MPC · JPL
753425	2016 AC_{179}	—	December 9, 2015	Haleakala	Pan-STARRS 1	·	1.9 km	MPC · JPL
753426	2016 AP_{180}	—	October 29, 2011	Mayhill-ISON	L. Elenin	·	580 m	MPC · JPL
753427	2016 AH_{183}	—	October 23, 2014	Kitt Peak	Spacewatch	·	2.1 km	MPC · JPL
753428	2016 AA_{191}	—	January 8, 2016	Haleakala	Pan-STARRS 1	EUP	2.9 km	MPC · JPL
753429	2016 AU_{191}	—	January 10, 2011	Mount Lemmon	Mount Lemmon Survey	·	1.8 km	MPC · JPL
753430	2016 AM_{192}	—	January 8, 2016	Tenerife	ESA OGS	·	3.6 km	MPC · JPL
753431	2016 AO_{192}	—	March 9, 2005	Mount Lemmon	Mount Lemmon Survey	·	900 m	MPC · JPL
753432	2016 AV_{195}	—	January 4, 2016	Haleakala	Pan-STARRS 1	L5	7.8 km	MPC · JPL
753433	2016 AK_{196}	—	January 11, 2016	Haleakala	Pan-STARRS 1	H	410 m	MPC · JPL
753434	2016 AM_{206}	—	January 7, 2016	Haleakala	Pan-STARRS 1	KOR	1.2 km	MPC · JPL
753435	2016 AC_{209}	—	January 8, 2016	Haleakala	Pan-STARRS 1	·	2.7 km	MPC · JPL
753436	2016 AG_{209}	—	August 11, 2002	Palomar	NEAT	·	1.9 km	MPC · JPL
753437	2016 AL_{209}	—	December 13, 2015	Haleakala	Pan-STARRS 1	·	2.6 km	MPC · JPL
753438	2016 AO_{209}	—	January 8, 2016	Haleakala	Pan-STARRS 1	·	2.6 km	MPC · JPL
753439	2016 AD_{214}	—	January 4, 2016	Haleakala	Pan-STARRS 1	EOS	1.5 km	MPC · JPL
753440	2016 AM_{214}	—	January 14, 2016	Haleakala	Pan-STARRS 1	·	2.6 km	MPC · JPL
753441	2016 AH_{216}	—	March 31, 2011	Haleakala	Pan-STARRS 1	·	2.2 km	MPC · JPL
753442	2016 AO_{216}	—	August 27, 2014	Haleakala	Pan-STARRS 1	·	2.2 km	MPC · JPL
753443	2016 AM_{217}	—	January 9, 2015	Haleakala	Pan-STARRS 1	·	2.7 km	MPC · JPL
753444	2016 AK_{218}	—	January 8, 2006	Mount Lemmon	Mount Lemmon Survey	·	1.4 km	MPC · JPL
753445	2016 AE_{219}	—	September 30, 2005	Mount Lemmon	Mount Lemmon Survey	·	1.4 km	MPC · JPL
753446	2016 AV_{219}	—	January 4, 2016	Haleakala	Pan-STARRS 1	·	2.2 km	MPC · JPL
753447	2016 AW_{219}	—	January 27, 2011	Catalina	CSS	·	1.8 km	MPC · JPL
753448	2016 AM_{221}	—	February 24, 2012	Haleakala	Pan-STARRS 1	·	1.7 km	MPC · JPL
753449	2016 AX_{227}	—	September 19, 2014	Haleakala	Pan-STARRS 1	THM	1.9 km	MPC · JPL
753450	2016 AO_{229}	—	January 20, 2015	Haleakala	Pan-STARRS 1	·	1.9 km	MPC · JPL
753451	2016 AV_{229}	—	October 20, 2008	Mount Lemmon	Mount Lemmon Survey	EOS	1.4 km	MPC · JPL
753452	2016 AH_{230}	—	December 1, 2014	Haleakala	Pan-STARRS 1	EOS	1.4 km	MPC · JPL
753453	2016 AY_{231}	—	January 7, 2016	Haleakala	Pan-STARRS 1	·	770 m	MPC · JPL
753454	2016 AO_{232}	—	January 1, 2016	Mount Lemmon	Mount Lemmon Survey	·	1.8 km	MPC · JPL
753455	2016 AZ_{232}	—	September 2, 2014	Haleakala	Pan-STARRS 1	·	1.4 km	MPC · JPL
753456	2016 AH_{234}	—	August 18, 2014	Haleakala	Pan-STARRS 1	·	2.6 km	MPC · JPL
753457	2016 AL_{237}	—	September 29, 2008	Mount Lemmon	Mount Lemmon Survey	·	1.7 km	MPC · JPL
753458	2016 AU_{237}	—	November 4, 2014	Mount Lemmon	Mount Lemmon Survey	·	2.3 km	MPC · JPL
753459	2016 AK_{238}	—	January 1, 2016	Haleakala	Pan-STARRS 1	EUN	930 m	MPC · JPL
753460	2016 AO_{238}	—	August 23, 2014	Haleakala	Pan-STARRS 1	·	1.7 km	MPC · JPL
753461	2016 AX_{241}	—	January 3, 2016	Haleakala	Pan-STARRS 1	·	1.3 km	MPC · JPL
753462	2016 AB_{243}	—	January 3, 2016	Haleakala	Pan-STARRS 1	·	3.2 km	MPC · JPL
753463	2016 AD_{243}	—	October 14, 2014	Mount Lemmon	Mount Lemmon Survey	·	1.6 km	MPC · JPL
753464	2016 AK_{243}	—	November 6, 2010	Mount Lemmon	Mount Lemmon Survey	AGN	980 m	MPC · JPL
753465	2016 AY_{243}	—	January 3, 2016	Haleakala	Pan-STARRS 1	·	2.4 km	MPC · JPL
753466	2016 AF_{244}	—	July 28, 2014	Haleakala	Pan-STARRS 1	·	1.2 km	MPC · JPL
753467	2016 AK_{245}	—	August 5, 2005	Palomar	NEAT	·	1.5 km	MPC · JPL
753468	2016 AS_{245}	—	November 1, 2005	Mount Lemmon	Mount Lemmon Survey	·	1.6 km	MPC · JPL
753469	2016 AS_{246}	—	January 19, 2012	Haleakala	Pan-STARRS 1	·	1.2 km	MPC · JPL
753470	2016 AD_{247}	—	January 3, 2016	Haleakala	Pan-STARRS 1	·	1.7 km	MPC · JPL
753471	2016 AL_{247}	—	December 6, 2015	Mount Lemmon	Mount Lemmon Survey	·	2.4 km	MPC · JPL
753472	2016 AS_{248}	—	November 8, 2009	Mount Lemmon	Mount Lemmon Survey	·	1.2 km	MPC · JPL
753473	2016 AO_{249}	—	January 4, 2016	Haleakala	Pan-STARRS 1	·	2.1 km	MPC · JPL
753474	2016 AM_{252}	—	April 28, 2011	Catalina	CSS	·	2.2 km	MPC · JPL
753475	2016 AN_{252}	—	August 15, 2013	Haleakala	Pan-STARRS 1	·	2.3 km	MPC · JPL
753476	2016 AY_{252}	—	July 15, 2013	Haleakala	Pan-STARRS 1	·	2.1 km	MPC · JPL
753477	2016 AB_{253}	—	January 4, 2016	Haleakala	Pan-STARRS 1	·	1.8 km	MPC · JPL
753478	2016 AW_{253}	—	January 30, 2012	Mount Lemmon	Mount Lemmon Survey	·	1.0 km	MPC · JPL
753479	2016 AG_{254}	—	February 15, 2012	Haleakala	Pan-STARRS 1	·	1.2 km	MPC · JPL
753480	2016 AS_{254}	—	September 18, 2014	Haleakala	Pan-STARRS 1	·	780 m	MPC · JPL
753481	2016 AD_{255}	—	January 26, 2006	Kitt Peak	Spacewatch	·	1.3 km	MPC · JPL
753482	2016 AK_{255}	—	September 25, 2014	Mount Lemmon	Mount Lemmon Survey	·	1.7 km	MPC · JPL
753483	2016 AP_{255}	—	January 24, 2011	Mount Lemmon	Mount Lemmon Survey	·	1.8 km	MPC · JPL
753484	2016 AA_{256}	—	October 1, 2014	Haleakala	Pan-STARRS 1	·	1.6 km	MPC · JPL
753485	2016 AB_{256}	—	March 2, 2011	Mount Lemmon	Mount Lemmon Survey	·	1.7 km	MPC · JPL
753486	2016 AV_{256}	—	January 7, 2016	Haleakala	Pan-STARRS 1	·	990 m	MPC · JPL
753487	2016 AL_{257}	—	July 14, 2013	Haleakala	Pan-STARRS 1	·	2.0 km	MPC · JPL
753488	2016 AS_{257}	—	August 15, 2013	Haleakala	Pan-STARRS 1	·	1.8 km	MPC · JPL
753489	2016 AX_{257}	—	November 23, 2014	Haleakala	Pan-STARRS 1	·	2.0 km	MPC · JPL
753490	2016 AM_{262}	—	January 8, 2016	Haleakala	Pan-STARRS 1	·	2.3 km	MPC · JPL
753491	2016 AP_{262}	—	September 11, 2002	Palomar	NEAT	·	2.1 km	MPC · JPL
753492	2016 AQ_{262}	—	November 26, 2014	Haleakala	Pan-STARRS 1	·	2.5 km	MPC · JPL
753493	2016 AW_{262}	—	January 6, 2010	Kitt Peak	Spacewatch	·	2.3 km	MPC · JPL
753494	2016 AY_{262}	—	January 8, 2016	Haleakala	Pan-STARRS 1	·	2.6 km	MPC · JPL
753495	2016 AC_{263}	—	January 8, 2016	Haleakala	Pan-STARRS 1	TRE	2.1 km	MPC · JPL
753496	2016 AM_{263}	—	December 1, 2014	Haleakala	Pan-STARRS 1	·	1.7 km	MPC · JPL
753497	2016 AB_{266}	—	January 9, 2016	Haleakala	Pan-STARRS 1	·	2.3 km	MPC · JPL
753498	2016 AM_{268}	—	January 12, 2016	Haleakala	Pan-STARRS 1	·	2.7 km	MPC · JPL
753499	2016 AN_{271}	—	July 13, 2013	Haleakala	Pan-STARRS 1	·	1.2 km	MPC · JPL
753500	2016 AU_{271}	—	August 20, 2014	Haleakala	Pan-STARRS 1	·	1.3 km	MPC · JPL

== 753501–753600 ==
back to top

Designation			Discovery			Properties		Ref
Permanent	Provisional	Named after	Date	Site	Discoverer(s)	Category	Diam.	Ref
753501	2016 AY_{271}	—	March 16, 2013	Mount Lemmon	Mount Lemmon Survey	·	530 m	MPC · JPL
753502	2016 AA_{274}	—	November 22, 2014	Haleakala	Pan-STARRS 1	·	2.2 km	MPC · JPL
753503	2016 AO_{274}	—	October 7, 2000	Kitt Peak	Spacewatch	·	660 m	MPC · JPL
753504	2016 AY_{276}	—	January 8, 2011	Mount Lemmon	Mount Lemmon Survey	·	2.4 km	MPC · JPL
753505	2016 AB_{277}	—	January 3, 2016	Mount Lemmon	Mount Lemmon Survey	V	490 m	MPC · JPL
753506	2016 AU_{277}	—	January 16, 2005	Kitt Peak	Spacewatch	·	3.0 km	MPC · JPL
753507	2016 AG_{279}	—	January 8, 2016	Haleakala	Pan-STARRS 1	·	610 m	MPC · JPL
753508	2016 AL_{296}	—	January 1, 2016	Haleakala	Pan-STARRS 1	EUN	860 m	MPC · JPL
753509	2016 AJ_{301}	—	January 11, 2016	Haleakala	Pan-STARRS 1	·	2.5 km	MPC · JPL
753510	2016 AW_{301}	—	January 13, 2016	Mount Lemmon	Mount Lemmon Survey	NEM	1.7 km	MPC · JPL
753511	2016 AL_{309}	—	January 14, 2016	Haleakala	Pan-STARRS 1	·	620 m	MPC · JPL
753512	2016 AS_{311}	—	January 9, 2016	Haleakala	Pan-STARRS 1	L5	7.5 km	MPC · JPL
753513	2016 AC_{312}	—	January 2, 2016	Mount Lemmon	Mount Lemmon Survey	·	730 m	MPC · JPL
753514	2016 AX_{314}	—	January 11, 2016	Haleakala	Pan-STARRS 1	H	470 m	MPC · JPL
753515	2016 AL_{321}	—	January 14, 2016	Haleakala	Pan-STARRS 1	·	610 m	MPC · JPL
753516	2016 AX_{321}	—	January 4, 2016	Haleakala	Pan-STARRS 1	·	2.4 km	MPC · JPL
753517	2016 AF_{327}	—	January 7, 2016	Haleakala	Pan-STARRS 1	·	2.7 km	MPC · JPL
753518	2016 AB_{340}	—	January 4, 2016	Haleakala	Pan-STARRS 1	·	1.1 km	MPC · JPL
753519	2016 AE_{340}	—	January 7, 2016	Haleakala	Pan-STARRS 1	·	1.2 km	MPC · JPL
753520	2016 AY_{347}	—	January 14, 2016	Haleakala	Pan-STARRS 1	L5	7.9 km	MPC · JPL
753521	2016 AJ_{351}	—	January 4, 2016	Haleakala	Pan-STARRS 1	L5	8.1 km	MPC · JPL
753522	2016 AD_{355}	—	January 1, 2016	Mount Lemmon	Mount Lemmon Survey	L5	7.8 km	MPC · JPL
753523	2016 AO_{383}	—	January 4, 2016	Haleakala	Pan-STARRS 1	L5	7.8 km	MPC · JPL
753524	2016 BE_{2}	—	January 25, 2011	Mount Lemmon	Mount Lemmon Survey	·	1.7 km	MPC · JPL
753525	2016 BK_{3}	—	November 1, 2008	Mount Lemmon	Mount Lemmon Survey	·	560 m	MPC · JPL
753526	2016 BL_{4}	—	April 1, 2011	Kitt Peak	Spacewatch	·	1.8 km	MPC · JPL
753527	2016 BU_{7}	—	December 24, 2014	Mount Lemmon	Mount Lemmon Survey	·	2.9 km	MPC · JPL
753528	2016 BD_{9}	—	January 8, 2016	Haleakala	Pan-STARRS 1	·	1.5 km	MPC · JPL
753529	2016 BB_{11}	—	December 11, 2014	Mount Lemmon	Mount Lemmon Survey	EOS	1.4 km	MPC · JPL
753530	2016 BM_{12}	—	September 17, 2010	Mount Lemmon	Mount Lemmon Survey	·	1.2 km	MPC · JPL
753531	2016 BT_{19}	—	February 8, 2011	Mount Lemmon	Mount Lemmon Survey	·	1.5 km	MPC · JPL
753532	2016 BU_{28}	—	August 6, 2014	Haleakala	Pan-STARRS 1	·	600 m	MPC · JPL
753533	2016 BC_{35}	—	March 10, 2011	Catalina	CSS	·	2.0 km	MPC · JPL
753534	2016 BX_{37}	—	February 2, 2009	Kitt Peak	Spacewatch	·	890 m	MPC · JPL
753535	2016 BL_{38}	—	January 7, 2016	Haleakala	Pan-STARRS 1	·	460 m	MPC · JPL
753536	2016 BT_{40}	—	January 29, 2016	Mount Lemmon	Mount Lemmon Survey	EOS	1.3 km	MPC · JPL
753537	2016 BX_{40}	—	September 17, 2009	Catalina	CSS	·	2.6 km	MPC · JPL
753538	2016 BM_{45}	—	January 29, 2016	Mount Lemmon	Mount Lemmon Survey	·	2.1 km	MPC · JPL
753539	2016 BF_{46}	—	November 22, 2014	Mount Lemmon	Mount Lemmon Survey	EOS	1.7 km	MPC · JPL
753540	2016 BV_{50}	—	September 6, 2014	Mount Lemmon	Mount Lemmon Survey	GEF	940 m	MPC · JPL
753541	2016 BM_{52}	—	February 13, 2012	Haleakala	Pan-STARRS 1	MAR	970 m	MPC · JPL
753542	2016 BN_{52}	—	March 17, 2013	Mount Lemmon	Mount Lemmon Survey	·	630 m	MPC · JPL
753543	2016 BX_{53}	—	January 30, 2016	Mount Lemmon	Mount Lemmon Survey	·	2.7 km	MPC · JPL
753544	2016 BG_{54}	—	February 10, 2011	Mount Lemmon	Mount Lemmon Survey	·	1.2 km	MPC · JPL
753545	2016 BT_{54}	—	September 10, 2007	Mount Lemmon	Mount Lemmon Survey	NYS	870 m	MPC · JPL
753546	2016 BP_{55}	—	October 22, 2014	Mount Lemmon	Mount Lemmon Survey	·	2.4 km	MPC · JPL
753547	2016 BM_{58}	—	September 30, 2005	Catalina	CSS	·	700 m	MPC · JPL
753548	2016 BV_{58}	—	March 6, 2006	Kitt Peak	Spacewatch	·	560 m	MPC · JPL
753549	2016 BX_{60}	—	January 3, 2011	Catalina	CSS	·	1.4 km	MPC · JPL
753550	2016 BC_{64}	—	February 9, 2011	Mount Lemmon	Mount Lemmon Survey	·	1.4 km	MPC · JPL
753551	2016 BW_{64}	—	August 23, 2014	Haleakala	Pan-STARRS 1	·	2.2 km	MPC · JPL
753552	2016 BS_{66}	—	May 14, 2012	Haleakala	Pan-STARRS 1	BRA	1.0 km	MPC · JPL
753553	2016 BK_{67}	—	January 16, 2016	Haleakala	Pan-STARRS 1	·	2.8 km	MPC · JPL
753554	2016 BM_{68}	—	December 3, 2010	Mount Lemmon	Mount Lemmon Survey	·	1.4 km	MPC · JPL
753555	2016 BB_{70}	—	October 5, 2014	Kitt Peak	Spacewatch	THM	1.9 km	MPC · JPL
753556	2016 BG_{71}	—	January 31, 2016	Haleakala	Pan-STARRS 1	·	1.2 km	MPC · JPL
753557	2016 BB_{75}	—	April 15, 2012	Haleakala	Pan-STARRS 1	·	1.4 km	MPC · JPL
753558	2016 BR_{75}	—	October 29, 2014	Haleakala	Pan-STARRS 1	EOS	1.3 km	MPC · JPL
753559	2016 BW_{81}	—	March 11, 2008	Catalina	CSS	H	470 m	MPC · JPL
753560	2016 BU_{84}	—	January 17, 2016	Haleakala	Pan-STARRS 1	·	2.7 km	MPC · JPL
753561	2016 BM_{85}	—	April 2, 2005	Mount Lemmon	Mount Lemmon Survey	·	2.7 km	MPC · JPL
753562	2016 BF_{86}	—	January 18, 2016	Haleakala	Pan-STARRS 1	ELF	2.6 km	MPC · JPL
753563	2016 BO_{87}	—	February 4, 2005	Mount Lemmon	Mount Lemmon Survey	·	2.7 km	MPC · JPL
753564	2016 BR_{87}	—	August 16, 2013	Mauna Kea	D. J. Tholen, M. Micheli	·	2.7 km	MPC · JPL
753565	2016 BA_{92}	—	November 25, 2014	Haleakala	Pan-STARRS 1	·	2.3 km	MPC · JPL
753566	2016 BS_{92}	—	September 20, 2009	Mount Lemmon	Mount Lemmon Survey	·	2.5 km	MPC · JPL
753567	2016 BG_{93}	—	December 19, 2009	Mount Lemmon	Mount Lemmon Survey	·	2.6 km	MPC · JPL
753568	2016 BN_{94}	—	April 1, 2012	Haleakala	Pan-STARRS 1	·	1.8 km	MPC · JPL
753569	2016 BK_{95}	—	October 24, 2013	Mount Lemmon	Mount Lemmon Survey	·	2.7 km	MPC · JPL
753570	2016 BZ_{95}	—	December 3, 2014	Haleakala	Pan-STARRS 1	·	2.9 km	MPC · JPL
753571	2016 BS_{97}	—	February 27, 2012	Kitt Peak	Spacewatch	·	1.1 km	MPC · JPL
753572	2016 BM_{98}	—	September 14, 2013	Haleakala	Pan-STARRS 1	·	2.5 km	MPC · JPL
753573	2016 BO_{98}	—	June 10, 2011	Mount Lemmon	Mount Lemmon Survey	·	3.4 km	MPC · JPL
753574	2016 BB_{99}	—	March 27, 2011	Mount Lemmon	Mount Lemmon Survey	·	1.7 km	MPC · JPL
753575	2016 BK_{99}	—	January 17, 2016	Haleakala	Pan-STARRS 1	·	2.8 km	MPC · JPL
753576	2016 BP_{100}	—	May 8, 2011	Mount Lemmon	Mount Lemmon Survey	·	2.4 km	MPC · JPL
753577	2016 BR_{100}	—	November 20, 2014	Haleakala	Pan-STARRS 1	·	1.5 km	MPC · JPL
753578	2016 BK_{101}	—	September 10, 2013	Haleakala	Pan-STARRS 1	·	1.7 km	MPC · JPL
753579	2016 BN_{101}	—	December 20, 2007	Kitt Peak	Spacewatch	NYS	910 m	MPC · JPL
753580	2016 BO_{102}	—	December 11, 2014	Mount Lemmon	Mount Lemmon Survey	·	2.2 km	MPC · JPL
753581	2016 BF_{103}	—	January 30, 2011	Mount Lemmon	Mount Lemmon Survey	EOS	1.6 km	MPC · JPL
753582	2016 BH_{103}	—	September 17, 2014	Haleakala	Pan-STARRS 1	·	2.0 km	MPC · JPL
753583	2016 BS_{104}	—	January 31, 2016	Haleakala	Pan-STARRS 1	·	1.9 km	MPC · JPL
753584	2016 BZ_{105}	—	January 16, 2016	Haleakala	Pan-STARRS 1	·	3.0 km	MPC · JPL
753585	2016 BT_{108}	—	January 18, 2016	Haleakala	Pan-STARRS 1	TIR	2.3 km	MPC · JPL
753586	2016 BH_{114}	—	January 30, 2016	Mount Lemmon	Mount Lemmon Survey	·	1.5 km	MPC · JPL
753587	2016 BU_{116}	—	January 29, 2016	Mount Lemmon	Mount Lemmon Survey	·	1.8 km	MPC · JPL
753588	2016 BH_{124}	—	January 19, 2016	Haleakala	Pan-STARRS 1	EUN	1.1 km	MPC · JPL
753589	2016 CZ	—	June 16, 2012	Haleakala	Pan-STARRS 1	TIR	3.2 km	MPC · JPL
753590	2016 CZ_{1}	—	January 4, 2016	Haleakala	Pan-STARRS 1	·	1.6 km	MPC · JPL
753591	2016 CC_{7}	—	January 17, 2016	Haleakala	Pan-STARRS 1	·	1.7 km	MPC · JPL
753592	2016 CH_{7}	—	October 4, 2013	Mount Lemmon	Mount Lemmon Survey	·	2.8 km	MPC · JPL
753593	2016 CU_{8}	—	March 16, 1994	Kitt Peak	Spacewatch	·	710 m	MPC · JPL
753594	2016 CF_{9}	—	January 2, 2016	Mount Lemmon	Mount Lemmon Survey	·	2.4 km	MPC · JPL
753595	2016 CY_{16}	—	June 18, 2013	Haleakala	Pan-STARRS 1	·	1.6 km	MPC · JPL
753596	2016 CS_{19}	—	October 8, 2008	Mount Lemmon	Mount Lemmon Survey	·	2.5 km	MPC · JPL
753597	2016 CU_{22}	—	January 7, 2016	Haleakala	Pan-STARRS 1	·	2.7 km	MPC · JPL
753598	2016 CY_{22}	—	August 26, 2000	Cerro Tololo	Deep Ecliptic Survey	·	550 m	MPC · JPL
753599	2016 CZ_{32}	—	December 17, 2015	Mount Lemmon	Mount Lemmon Survey	TIR	2.8 km	MPC · JPL
753600	2016 CH_{33}	—	March 29, 2011	Mount Lemmon	Mount Lemmon Survey	THM	1.6 km	MPC · JPL

== 753601–753700 ==
back to top

Designation			Discovery			Properties		Ref
Permanent	Provisional	Named after	Date	Site	Discoverer(s)	Category	Diam.	Ref
753601	2016 CP_{37}	—	January 8, 2016	Haleakala	Pan-STARRS 1	(18466)	2.0 km	MPC · JPL
753602	2016 CN_{42}	—	April 5, 2011	Mount Lemmon	Mount Lemmon Survey	VER	2.1 km	MPC · JPL
753603	2016 CO_{43}	—	September 20, 2014	Haleakala	Pan-STARRS 1	·	2.6 km	MPC · JPL
753604	2016 CD_{44}	—	February 3, 2006	Mount Lemmon	Mount Lemmon Survey	·	650 m	MPC · JPL
753605	2016 CX_{47}	—	November 22, 2014	Haleakala	Pan-STARRS 1	·	2.5 km	MPC · JPL
753606	2016 CL_{48}	—	June 18, 2013	Haleakala	Pan-STARRS 1	·	1.6 km	MPC · JPL
753607	2016 CV_{49}	—	July 1, 2005	Kitt Peak	Spacewatch	·	1.5 km	MPC · JPL
753608	2016 CU_{52}	—	December 19, 2004	Mount Lemmon	Mount Lemmon Survey	·	1.4 km	MPC · JPL
753609	2016 CS_{56}	—	April 29, 2012	Kitt Peak	Spacewatch	·	1.7 km	MPC · JPL
753610	2016 CU_{57}	—	November 24, 2014	Haleakala	Pan-STARRS 1	·	1.8 km	MPC · JPL
753611	2016 CX_{57}	—	January 31, 2009	Mount Lemmon	Mount Lemmon Survey	V	400 m	MPC · JPL
753612	2016 CX_{58}	—	August 14, 2013	Haleakala	Pan-STARRS 1	·	1.8 km	MPC · JPL
753613	2016 CA_{59}	—	January 25, 2011	Mount Lemmon	Mount Lemmon Survey	·	1.8 km	MPC · JPL
753614	2016 CE_{61}	—	September 27, 2013	Haleakala	Pan-STARRS 1	·	2.9 km	MPC · JPL
753615	2016 CA_{65}	—	November 21, 2014	Haleakala	Pan-STARRS 1	·	1.9 km	MPC · JPL
753616	2016 CD_{67}	—	April 18, 2013	Mount Lemmon	Mount Lemmon Survey	·	1.2 km	MPC · JPL
753617	2016 CY_{68}	—	August 28, 2014	Haleakala	Pan-STARRS 1	·	1.6 km	MPC · JPL
753618	2016 CR_{69}	—	March 26, 2011	Kitt Peak	Spacewatch	·	2.0 km	MPC · JPL
753619	2016 CM_{74}	—	May 7, 2014	Haleakala	Pan-STARRS 1	HNS	1.3 km	MPC · JPL
753620	2016 CC_{76}	—	March 16, 2005	Catalina	CSS	TIR	2.1 km	MPC · JPL
753621	2016 CY_{77}	—	January 8, 2016	Haleakala	Pan-STARRS 1	VER	2.1 km	MPC · JPL
753622	2016 CP_{82}	—	September 22, 2008	Mount Lemmon	Mount Lemmon Survey	·	2.1 km	MPC · JPL
753623	2016 CF_{85}	—	September 12, 2007	Mount Lemmon	Mount Lemmon Survey	·	2.8 km	MPC · JPL
753624	2016 CX_{87}	—	February 5, 2016	Haleakala	Pan-STARRS 1	EOS	1.5 km	MPC · JPL
753625	2016 CM_{89}	—	November 22, 2009	Mount Lemmon	Mount Lemmon Survey	·	1.7 km	MPC · JPL
753626	2016 CT_{92}	—	January 23, 2006	Kitt Peak	Spacewatch	·	600 m	MPC · JPL
753627	2016 CC_{100}	—	February 25, 2006	Kitt Peak	Spacewatch	·	1.3 km	MPC · JPL
753628	2016 CM_{100}	—	January 4, 2016	Haleakala	Pan-STARRS 1	EOS	1.6 km	MPC · JPL
753629	2016 CQ_{100}	—	December 10, 2010	Mount Lemmon	Mount Lemmon Survey	·	1.2 km	MPC · JPL
753630	2016 CV_{102}	—	January 16, 2016	Haleakala	Pan-STARRS 1	·	1.8 km	MPC · JPL
753631	2016 CG_{103}	—	October 8, 2008	Kitt Peak	Spacewatch	·	2.0 km	MPC · JPL
753632	2016 CD_{105}	—	February 5, 2016	Haleakala	Pan-STARRS 1	·	2.1 km	MPC · JPL
753633	2016 CZ_{111}	—	January 16, 2016	Haleakala	Pan-STARRS 1	·	1.6 km	MPC · JPL
753634	2016 CA_{112}	—	February 25, 2011	Kitt Peak	Spacewatch	·	2.0 km	MPC · JPL
753635	2016 CG_{112}	—	July 12, 2013	Haleakala	Pan-STARRS 1	·	2.2 km	MPC · JPL
753636	2016 CX_{112}	—	January 16, 2016	Haleakala	Pan-STARRS 1	·	2.3 km	MPC · JPL
753637	2016 CP_{114}	—	April 12, 2013	Haleakala	Pan-STARRS 1	·	650 m	MPC · JPL
753638	2016 CT_{114}	—	August 17, 2012	Tenerife	ESA OGS	T_{j} (2.99) · EUP	2.7 km	MPC · JPL
753639	2016 CP_{115}	—	November 1, 2008	Mount Lemmon	Mount Lemmon Survey	·	2.4 km	MPC · JPL
753640	2016 CS_{119}	—	January 4, 2016	Haleakala	Pan-STARRS 1	(883)	550 m	MPC · JPL
753641	2016 CC_{126}	—	May 19, 2006	Mount Lemmon	Mount Lemmon Survey	V	410 m	MPC · JPL
753642	2016 CR_{126}	—	January 16, 2016	Haleakala	Pan-STARRS 1	EOS	1.2 km	MPC · JPL
753643	2016 CL_{128}	—	May 8, 2013	Haleakala	Pan-STARRS 1	V	440 m	MPC · JPL
753644	2016 CJ_{130}	—	September 23, 2011	Kitt Peak	Spacewatch	·	720 m	MPC · JPL
753645	2016 CL_{134}	—	January 15, 2011	Mount Lemmon	Mount Lemmon Survey	·	1.9 km	MPC · JPL
753646	2016 CA_{139}	—	January 7, 2010	Kitt Peak	Spacewatch	·	2.4 km	MPC · JPL
753647	2016 CU_{140}	—	October 28, 2014	Haleakala	Pan-STARRS 1	EOS	1.5 km	MPC · JPL
753648	2016 CZ_{142}	—	August 14, 2013	Haleakala	Pan-STARRS 1	·	2.5 km	MPC · JPL
753649	2016 CR_{143}	—	January 8, 2016	Haleakala	Pan-STARRS 1	·	2.1 km	MPC · JPL
753650	2016 CC_{144}	—	December 12, 2015	Haleakala	Pan-STARRS 1	HNS	1.1 km	MPC · JPL
753651	2016 CF_{145}	—	October 28, 2014	Haleakala	Pan-STARRS 1	EOS	1.4 km	MPC · JPL
753652	2016 CT_{146}	—	January 2, 2011	Mount Lemmon	Mount Lemmon Survey	·	1.8 km	MPC · JPL
753653	2016 CY_{146}	—	February 2, 2016	Haleakala	Pan-STARRS 1	·	2.1 km	MPC · JPL
753654	2016 CV_{148}	—	August 9, 2013	Haleakala	Pan-STARRS 1	·	1.9 km	MPC · JPL
753655	2016 CJ_{151}	—	October 24, 2011	Haleakala	Pan-STARRS 1	·	570 m	MPC · JPL
753656	2016 CK_{152}	—	September 10, 2007	Mount Lemmon	Mount Lemmon Survey	MAS	640 m	MPC · JPL
753657	2016 CW_{155}	—	November 20, 2014	Haleakala	Pan-STARRS 1	·	2.4 km	MPC · JPL
753658	2016 CO_{158}	—	October 17, 2014	Mount Lemmon	Mount Lemmon Survey	·	1.7 km	MPC · JPL
753659	2016 CV_{158}	—	December 8, 2010	Mount Lemmon	Mount Lemmon Survey	·	1.9 km	MPC · JPL
753660	2016 CH_{162}	—	August 19, 2014	Haleakala	Pan-STARRS 1	·	730 m	MPC · JPL
753661	2016 CE_{163}	—	February 10, 2011	Mount Lemmon	Mount Lemmon Survey	EOS	1.6 km	MPC · JPL
753662	2016 CS_{163}	—	February 10, 2011	Mount Lemmon	Mount Lemmon Survey	THM	1.6 km	MPC · JPL
753663	2016 CZ_{163}	—	October 12, 2013	Kitt Peak	Spacewatch	L5	6.3 km	MPC · JPL
753664	2016 CM_{165}	—	December 18, 2015	Mount Lemmon	Mount Lemmon Survey	·	1.4 km	MPC · JPL
753665	2016 CL_{169}	—	March 26, 2006	Kitt Peak	Spacewatch	·	550 m	MPC · JPL
753666	2016 CX_{176}	—	December 9, 2015	Haleakala	Pan-STARRS 1	·	2.7 km	MPC · JPL
753667	2016 CB_{186}	—	July 17, 2013	Haleakala	Pan-STARRS 1	·	2.0 km	MPC · JPL
753668	2016 CJ_{186}	—	June 11, 2013	Mount Lemmon	Mount Lemmon Survey	·	3.2 km	MPC · JPL
753669	2016 CE_{189}	—	March 26, 2003	Palomar	NEAT	EUN	950 m	MPC · JPL
753670	2016 CK_{190}	—	April 10, 2003	Kitt Peak	Spacewatch	·	480 m	MPC · JPL
753671	2016 CW_{191}	—	January 3, 2016	Haleakala	Pan-STARRS 1	THM	1.7 km	MPC · JPL
753672	2016 CE_{193}	—	January 4, 2016	Haleakala	Pan-STARRS 1	H	390 m	MPC · JPL
753673	2016 CU_{197}	—	September 20, 2014	Haleakala	Pan-STARRS 1	·	1.6 km	MPC · JPL
753674	2016 CV_{197}	—	February 9, 2016	Haleakala	Pan-STARRS 1	·	2.8 km	MPC · JPL
753675	2016 CH_{200}	—	February 3, 2006	Mount Lemmon	Mount Lemmon Survey	·	1.6 km	MPC · JPL
753676	2016 CY_{201}	—	February 9, 2016	Haleakala	Pan-STARRS 1	·	2.2 km	MPC · JPL
753677	2016 CZ_{201}	—	September 20, 2014	Haleakala	Pan-STARRS 1	·	2.2 km	MPC · JPL
753678	2016 CQ_{206}	—	October 28, 2014	Haleakala	Pan-STARRS 1	HOF	2.0 km	MPC · JPL
753679	2016 CM_{208}	—	September 5, 2008	Kitt Peak	Spacewatch	·	2.1 km	MPC · JPL
753680	2016 CD_{210}	—	April 2, 2011	Kitt Peak	Spacewatch	·	2.2 km	MPC · JPL
753681	2016 CH_{210}	—	January 16, 2009	Kitt Peak	Spacewatch	·	700 m	MPC · JPL
753682	2016 CN_{212}	—	February 9, 2016	Mount Lemmon	Mount Lemmon Survey	·	2.1 km	MPC · JPL
753683	2016 CY_{213}	—	March 11, 2005	Mount Lemmon	Mount Lemmon Survey	VER	2.1 km	MPC · JPL
753684	2016 CL_{216}	—	September 7, 2008	Mount Lemmon	Mount Lemmon Survey	·	2.2 km	MPC · JPL
753685	2016 CK_{217}	—	March 3, 2009	Kitt Peak	Spacewatch	·	1.0 km	MPC · JPL
753686	2016 CW_{220}	—	April 1, 2009	Kitt Peak	Spacewatch	·	930 m	MPC · JPL
753687	2016 CK_{222}	—	February 10, 2002	Socorro	LINEAR	·	1.7 km	MPC · JPL
753688	2016 CV_{229}	—	October 23, 2014	Kitt Peak	Spacewatch	·	2.0 km	MPC · JPL
753689	2016 CP_{230}	—	March 26, 2011	Haleakala	Pan-STARRS 1	·	3.4 km	MPC · JPL
753690	2016 CR_{231}	—	August 31, 2014	Haleakala	Pan-STARRS 1	·	1.9 km	MPC · JPL
753691	2016 CT_{231}	—	October 22, 2014	Mount Lemmon	Mount Lemmon Survey	·	2.0 km	MPC · JPL
753692	2016 CE_{235}	—	March 12, 2011	Mount Lemmon	Mount Lemmon Survey	·	1.8 km	MPC · JPL
753693	2016 CT_{239}	—	September 24, 2008	Kitt Peak	Spacewatch	·	2.8 km	MPC · JPL
753694	2016 CV_{240}	—	February 10, 2016	Haleakala	Pan-STARRS 1	·	2.5 km	MPC · JPL
753695	2016 CO_{242}	—	December 1, 2014	Haleakala	Pan-STARRS 1	·	2.4 km	MPC · JPL
753696	2016 CE_{243}	—	April 6, 2011	Dauban	C. Rinner, Kugel, F.	·	2.5 km	MPC · JPL
753697	2016 CG_{244}	—	November 21, 2014	Haleakala	Pan-STARRS 1	URS	2.8 km	MPC · JPL
753698	2016 CK_{244}	—	March 9, 2005	Catalina	CSS	TIR	2.3 km	MPC · JPL
753699	2016 CV_{248}	—	September 21, 2003	Kitt Peak	Spacewatch	MAS	810 m	MPC · JPL
753700	2016 CG_{249}	—	September 16, 2003	Kitt Peak	Spacewatch	·	1.2 km	MPC · JPL

== 753701–753800 ==
back to top

Designation			Discovery			Properties		Ref
Permanent	Provisional	Named after	Date	Site	Discoverer(s)	Category	Diam.	Ref
753701	2016 CX_{252}	—	October 16, 2014	Mount Lemmon	Mount Lemmon Survey	·	2.1 km	MPC · JPL
753702	2016 CC_{253}	—	October 23, 2014	Kitt Peak	Spacewatch	·	1.7 km	MPC · JPL
753703	2016 CL_{253}	—	November 18, 2007	Mount Lemmon	Mount Lemmon Survey	·	1.2 km	MPC · JPL
753704	2016 CE_{257}	—	October 22, 2006	Kitt Peak	Spacewatch	·	1.2 km	MPC · JPL
753705	2016 CU_{257}	—	November 21, 2014	Haleakala	Pan-STARRS 1	·	1.4 km	MPC · JPL
753706	2016 CE_{259}	—	February 11, 2016	Haleakala	Pan-STARRS 1	·	570 m	MPC · JPL
753707	2016 CA_{262}	—	September 15, 2002	Palomar	NEAT	T_{j} (2.98)	3.9 km	MPC · JPL
753708	2016 CC_{271}	—	February 5, 2016	Haleakala	Pan-STARRS 1	·	2.5 km	MPC · JPL
753709	2016 CM_{271}	—	January 19, 2005	Kitt Peak	Spacewatch	·	1.9 km	MPC · JPL
753710	2016 CO_{272}	—	March 6, 2011	Kitt Peak	Spacewatch	·	2.1 km	MPC · JPL
753711	2016 CO_{274}	—	February 14, 2005	Kitt Peak	Spacewatch	·	2.4 km	MPC · JPL
753712	2016 CC_{276}	—	February 11, 2016	Haleakala	Pan-STARRS 1	·	2.6 km	MPC · JPL
753713	2016 CO_{276}	—	February 11, 2016	Haleakala	Pan-STARRS 1	·	2.5 km	MPC · JPL
753714	2016 CK_{277}	—	May 1, 1994	Kitt Peak	Spacewatch	·	2.9 km	MPC · JPL
753715	2016 CE_{278}	—	February 4, 2016	Haleakala	Pan-STARRS 1	·	1.9 km	MPC · JPL
753716	2016 CE_{281}	—	February 25, 2007	Mount Lemmon	Mount Lemmon Survey	NEM	1.7 km	MPC · JPL
753717	2016 CQ_{283}	—	March 17, 2005	Kitt Peak	Spacewatch	·	2.5 km	MPC · JPL
753718	2016 CV_{283}	—	January 17, 2015	Haleakala	Pan-STARRS 1	·	2.3 km	MPC · JPL
753719	2016 CY_{283}	—	December 26, 2014	La Palma	Oteo, I., Afonso, A.	THM	1.9 km	MPC · JPL
753720	2016 CW_{286}	—	April 30, 2011	Haleakala	Pan-STARRS 1	·	2.5 km	MPC · JPL
753721	2016 CB_{287}	—	February 5, 2016	Haleakala	Pan-STARRS 1	·	2.0 km	MPC · JPL
753722	2016 CS_{287}	—	August 14, 2013	Haleakala	Pan-STARRS 1	·	2.4 km	MPC · JPL
753723	2016 CH_{288}	—	September 3, 2013	Haleakala	Pan-STARRS 1	EOS	1.4 km	MPC · JPL
753724	2016 CK_{289}	—	October 31, 2014	Kitt Peak	Spacewatch	KOR	1.3 km	MPC · JPL
753725	2016 CN_{290}	—	November 24, 2014	Haleakala	Pan-STARRS 1	·	1.6 km	MPC · JPL
753726	2016 CC_{293}	—	October 1, 2008	Mount Lemmon	Mount Lemmon Survey	·	1.8 km	MPC · JPL
753727	2016 CJ_{293}	—	December 11, 2014	Mount Lemmon	Mount Lemmon Survey	·	1.5 km	MPC · JPL
753728	2016 CM_{293}	—	December 22, 2003	Kitt Peak	Spacewatch	TIR	2.6 km	MPC · JPL
753729	2016 CR_{295}	—	October 28, 2014	Mayhill-ISON	L. Elenin	·	1.6 km	MPC · JPL
753730	2016 CM_{296}	—	April 21, 2006	Kitt Peak	Spacewatch	EOS	1.6 km	MPC · JPL
753731	2016 CT_{296}	—	September 10, 2007	Kitt Peak	Spacewatch	·	3.0 km	MPC · JPL
753732	2016 CC_{297}	—	February 3, 2016	Haleakala	Pan-STARRS 1	·	1.1 km	MPC · JPL
753733	2016 CH_{297}	—	February 3, 2016	Haleakala	Pan-STARRS 1	·	2.6 km	MPC · JPL
753734	2016 CL_{297}	—	February 3, 2016	Haleakala	Pan-STARRS 1	·	2.7 km	MPC · JPL
753735	2016 CP_{297}	—	January 20, 2015	Haleakala	Pan-STARRS 1	·	2.8 km	MPC · JPL
753736	2016 CN_{298}	—	August 14, 2013	Haleakala	Pan-STARRS 1	·	3.0 km	MPC · JPL
753737	2016 CZ_{299}	—	February 4, 2016	Haleakala	Pan-STARRS 1	·	2.7 km	MPC · JPL
753738	2016 CH_{301}	—	February 5, 2016	Haleakala	Pan-STARRS 1	·	1.7 km	MPC · JPL
753739	2016 CK_{301}	—	February 5, 2016	Haleakala	Pan-STARRS 1	·	2.8 km	MPC · JPL
753740	2016 CM_{301}	—	February 8, 2011	Mount Lemmon	Mount Lemmon Survey	·	1.5 km	MPC · JPL
753741	2016 CT_{302}	—	February 5, 2016	Haleakala	Pan-STARRS 1	·	2.1 km	MPC · JPL
753742	2016 CQ_{303}	—	November 26, 2014	Haleakala	Pan-STARRS 1	·	2.0 km	MPC · JPL
753743	2016 CJ_{304}	—	February 5, 2016	Haleakala	Pan-STARRS 1	EOS	1.7 km	MPC · JPL
753744	2016 CZ_{304}	—	January 20, 2012	Kitt Peak	Spacewatch	PHO	720 m	MPC · JPL
753745	2016 CF_{305}	—	June 10, 2011	Mount Lemmon	Mount Lemmon Survey	·	2.5 km	MPC · JPL
753746	2016 CA_{306}	—	July 14, 2013	Haleakala	Pan-STARRS 1	·	1.6 km	MPC · JPL
753747	2016 CN_{306}	—	December 10, 2014	Haleakala	Pan-STARRS 1	·	2.0 km	MPC · JPL
753748	2016 CS_{312}	—	March 17, 2005	Mount Lemmon	Mount Lemmon Survey	·	2.4 km	MPC · JPL
753749	2016 CC_{316}	—	October 29, 2014	Haleakala	Pan-STARRS 1	EOS	1.2 km	MPC · JPL
753750	2016 CY_{316}	—	November 26, 2014	Haleakala	Pan-STARRS 1	·	2.3 km	MPC · JPL
753751	2016 CR_{317}	—	December 29, 2014	Haleakala	Pan-STARRS 1	·	3.1 km	MPC · JPL
753752	2016 CF_{322}	—	August 8, 2012	Haleakala	Pan-STARRS 1	TIR	2.7 km	MPC · JPL
753753	2016 CD_{323}	—	February 6, 2016	Haleakala	Pan-STARRS 1	·	1.7 km	MPC · JPL
753754	2016 CP_{323}	—	February 6, 2016	Haleakala	Pan-STARRS 1	·	3.2 km	MPC · JPL
753755	2016 CK_{324}	—	August 13, 2006	Palomar	NEAT	·	2.5 km	MPC · JPL
753756	2016 CF_{326}	—	February 9, 2016	Haleakala	Pan-STARRS 1	NYS	740 m	MPC · JPL
753757	2016 CQ_{330}	—	February 11, 2016	Haleakala	Pan-STARRS 1	·	3.2 km	MPC · JPL
753758	2016 CW_{330}	—	October 3, 2014	Mayhill-ISON	L. Elenin	·	1.5 km	MPC · JPL
753759	2016 CC_{331}	—	February 5, 2016	Haleakala	Pan-STARRS 1	·	550 m	MPC · JPL
753760	2016 CZ_{331}	—	February 10, 2016	Haleakala	Pan-STARRS 1	·	2.6 km	MPC · JPL
753761	2016 CA_{337}	—	February 10, 2016	Haleakala	Pan-STARRS 1	·	3.0 km	MPC · JPL
753762	2016 CV_{339}	—	December 19, 2009	Kitt Peak	Spacewatch	·	1.6 km	MPC · JPL
753763	2016 CR_{340}	—	February 3, 2016	Haleakala	Pan-STARRS 1	EUN	1.1 km	MPC · JPL
753764	2016 CJ_{341}	—	February 3, 2016	Haleakala	Pan-STARRS 1	·	2.3 km	MPC · JPL
753765	2016 CG_{342}	—	February 7, 2016	Mount Lemmon	Mount Lemmon Survey	·	2.4 km	MPC · JPL
753766	2016 CQ_{345}	—	February 11, 2016	Haleakala	Pan-STARRS 1	·	2.4 km	MPC · JPL
753767	2016 CD_{346}	—	February 4, 2016	Haleakala	Pan-STARRS 1	·	2.2 km	MPC · JPL
753768	2016 CJ_{351}	—	February 11, 2016	Haleakala	Pan-STARRS 1	·	2.3 km	MPC · JPL
753769	2016 CB_{358}	—	February 9, 2016	Haleakala	Pan-STARRS 1	·	2.5 km	MPC · JPL
753770	2016 CN_{360}	—	February 9, 2016	Haleakala	Pan-STARRS 1	EOS	1.5 km	MPC · JPL
753771	2016 CU_{368}	—	February 12, 2016	Haleakala	Pan-STARRS 1	·	2.0 km	MPC · JPL
753772	2016 CO_{372}	—	February 10, 2016	Haleakala	Pan-STARRS 1	·	1.5 km	MPC · JPL
753773	2016 CW_{380}	—	October 30, 2013	Haleakala	Pan-STARRS 1	·	2.5 km	MPC · JPL
753774	2016 CW_{396}	—	February 3, 2016	Haleakala	Pan-STARRS 1	·	2.7 km	MPC · JPL
753775	2016 CC_{411}	—	February 10, 2016	Haleakala	Pan-STARRS 1	·	1.7 km	MPC · JPL
753776	2016 DN	—	January 3, 2016	Haleakala	Pan-STARRS 1	H	440 m	MPC · JPL
753777	2016 DA_{2}	—	November 16, 2009	La Sagra	OAM	H	540 m	MPC · JPL
753778	2016 DU_{2}	—	March 10, 2007	Catalina	CSS	·	1.6 km	MPC · JPL
753779	2016 DD_{3}	—	August 6, 2014	Haleakala	Pan-STARRS 1	·	1.0 km	MPC · JPL
753780	2016 DF_{4}	—	January 14, 2016	Haleakala	Pan-STARRS 1	·	2.1 km	MPC · JPL
753781	2016 DY_{4}	—	February 6, 2016	Haleakala	Pan-STARRS 1	EUP	3.7 km	MPC · JPL
753782	2016 DE_{5}	—	February 19, 2009	Kitt Peak	Spacewatch	·	690 m	MPC · JPL
753783	2016 DS_{8}	—	September 15, 2007	Kitt Peak	Spacewatch	·	760 m	MPC · JPL
753784	2016 DR_{11}	—	January 4, 2012	Mount Lemmon	Mount Lemmon Survey	·	920 m	MPC · JPL
753785	2016 DZ_{11}	—	February 25, 2011	Mount Lemmon	Mount Lemmon Survey	TEL	1.1 km	MPC · JPL
753786	2016 DB_{16}	—	October 2, 2014	Haleakala	Pan-STARRS 1	·	1.3 km	MPC · JPL
753787	2016 DN_{18}	—	February 9, 2005	Kitt Peak	Spacewatch	·	2.4 km	MPC · JPL
753788	2016 DW_{23}	—	March 10, 2005	Mount Lemmon	Mount Lemmon Survey	·	1.2 km	MPC · JPL
753789	2016 DA_{25}	—	February 4, 2016	Haleakala	Pan-STARRS 1	·	2.1 km	MPC · JPL
753790	2016 DV_{27}	—	February 3, 2016	Catalina	CSS	·	2.8 km	MPC · JPL
753791	2016 DJ_{30}	—	February 29, 2016	Haleakala	Pan-STARRS 1	URS	2.3 km	MPC · JPL
753792	2016 DU_{31}	—	February 20, 2016	Haleakala	Pan-STARRS 1	·	1.7 km	MPC · JPL
753793	2016 DL_{32}	—	March 4, 2005	Mount Lemmon	Mount Lemmon Survey	·	2.0 km	MPC · JPL
753794	2016 DU_{33}	—	February 27, 2012	Haleakala	Pan-STARRS 1	MAR	970 m	MPC · JPL
753795	2016 DY_{33}	—	April 2, 2006	Kitt Peak	Spacewatch	·	2.0 km	MPC · JPL
753796	2016 EN_{2}	—	January 4, 2016	Haleakala	Pan-STARRS 1	·	2.2 km	MPC · JPL
753797	2016 EN_{3}	—	January 15, 2016	Haleakala	Pan-STARRS 1	·	1.4 km	MPC · JPL
753798	2016 EK_{5}	—	January 2, 2011	Mount Lemmon	Mount Lemmon Survey	KOR	1.2 km	MPC · JPL
753799	2016 EK_{9}	—	April 2, 2011	Kitt Peak	Spacewatch	·	2.1 km	MPC · JPL
753800	2016 EA_{10}	—	February 11, 2016	Haleakala	Pan-STARRS 1	·	1.6 km	MPC · JPL

== 753801–753900 ==
back to top

Designation			Discovery			Properties		Ref
Permanent	Provisional	Named after	Date	Site	Discoverer(s)	Category	Diam.	Ref
753801	2016 EV_{10}	—	April 13, 2011	Mount Lemmon	Mount Lemmon Survey	·	2.2 km	MPC · JPL
753802	2016 EW_{10}	—	January 7, 2010	Mount Lemmon	Mount Lemmon Survey	EOS	1.2 km	MPC · JPL
753803	2016 EH_{11}	—	March 3, 2016	Haleakala	Pan-STARRS 1	·	2.2 km	MPC · JPL
753804	2016 EW_{11}	—	October 24, 2013	Mount Lemmon	Mount Lemmon Survey	·	2.8 km	MPC · JPL
753805	2016 ED_{12}	—	April 20, 2012	Kitt Peak	Spacewatch	·	1.4 km	MPC · JPL
753806	2016 EX_{13}	—	February 11, 2016	Haleakala	Pan-STARRS 1	T_{j} (2.99) · EUP	2.7 km	MPC · JPL
753807	2016 ED_{14}	—	April 5, 2011	Kitt Peak	Spacewatch	·	2.8 km	MPC · JPL
753808	2016 EV_{14}	—	January 8, 2016	Haleakala	Pan-STARRS 1	·	3.5 km	MPC · JPL
753809	2016 EZ_{14}	—	March 3, 2016	Haleakala	Pan-STARRS 1	BRA	1.2 km	MPC · JPL
753810	2016 EG_{16}	—	April 14, 2005	Kitt Peak	Spacewatch	PHO	660 m	MPC · JPL
753811	2016 EL_{16}	—	December 6, 2010	Mount Lemmon	Mount Lemmon Survey	·	1.5 km	MPC · JPL
753812	2016 EY_{16}	—	April 30, 2011	Kitt Peak	Spacewatch	·	3.1 km	MPC · JPL
753813	2016 EU_{17}	—	January 9, 2016	Haleakala	Pan-STARRS 1	·	2.9 km	MPC · JPL
753814	2016 ET_{20}	—	December 14, 2004	Kitt Peak	Spacewatch	·	1.6 km	MPC · JPL
753815	2016 EN_{21}	—	October 5, 2013	Haleakala	Pan-STARRS 1	URS	2.6 km	MPC · JPL
753816	2016 EP_{21}	—	November 29, 2014	Mount Lemmon	Mount Lemmon Survey	·	2.0 km	MPC · JPL
753817	2016 EV_{21}	—	February 12, 2016	Haleakala	Pan-STARRS 1	·	2.0 km	MPC · JPL
753818	2016 EG_{22}	—	March 3, 2016	Haleakala	Pan-STARRS 1	·	2.3 km	MPC · JPL
753819	2016 EJ_{22}	—	March 3, 2016	Haleakala	Pan-STARRS 1	·	2.9 km	MPC · JPL
753820	2016 EG_{23}	—	November 17, 2009	Mount Lemmon	Mount Lemmon Survey	·	1.8 km	MPC · JPL
753821	2016 EM_{25}	—	January 16, 2016	Haleakala	Pan-STARRS 1	·	2.4 km	MPC · JPL
753822	2016 EK_{31}	—	April 12, 2011	Mount Lemmon	Mount Lemmon Survey	·	2.6 km	MPC · JPL
753823	2016 EW_{31}	—	March 3, 2016	Haleakala	Pan-STARRS 1	URS	2.8 km	MPC · JPL
753824	2016 EX_{32}	—	January 11, 2010	Kitt Peak	Spacewatch	·	2.5 km	MPC · JPL
753825	2016 EB_{34}	—	March 3, 2016	Haleakala	Pan-STARRS 1	·	1.9 km	MPC · JPL
753826	2016 EG_{34}	—	March 3, 2016	Haleakala	Pan-STARRS 1	·	1.5 km	MPC · JPL
753827	2016 EZ_{35}	—	November 19, 2008	Kitt Peak	Spacewatch	·	2.2 km	MPC · JPL
753828	2016 EG_{36}	—	December 11, 2014	Mount Lemmon	Mount Lemmon Survey	·	2.1 km	MPC · JPL
753829	2016 ER_{36}	—	March 3, 2016	Haleakala	Pan-STARRS 1	·	2.7 km	MPC · JPL
753830	2016 EQ_{37}	—	February 11, 2016	Haleakala	Pan-STARRS 1	·	680 m	MPC · JPL
753831	2016 EM_{39}	—	July 16, 2013	Haleakala	Pan-STARRS 1	·	1.4 km	MPC · JPL
753832	2016 EV_{40}	—	December 11, 2009	Mount Lemmon	Mount Lemmon Survey	·	2.6 km	MPC · JPL
753833	2016 EL_{45}	—	December 13, 2015	Haleakala	Pan-STARRS 1	·	2.4 km	MPC · JPL
753834	2016 EW_{49}	—	March 3, 2016	Haleakala	Pan-STARRS 1	BRA	1.3 km	MPC · JPL
753835	2016 EK_{51}	—	March 4, 2016	Haleakala	Pan-STARRS 1	·	1.5 km	MPC · JPL
753836	2016 EO_{51}	—	December 15, 2014	Mount Lemmon	Mount Lemmon Survey	·	2.1 km	MPC · JPL
753837	2016 EV_{51}	—	March 2, 2016	Haleakala	Pan-STARRS 1	·	800 m	MPC · JPL
753838	2016 EL_{52}	—	January 14, 2015	Haleakala	Pan-STARRS 1	·	2.6 km	MPC · JPL
753839	2016 EV_{52}	—	December 26, 2014	Haleakala	Pan-STARRS 1	EOS	1.6 km	MPC · JPL
753840	2016 EE_{53}	—	February 20, 2016	Haleakala	Pan-STARRS 1	·	700 m	MPC · JPL
753841	2016 EV_{54}	—	October 15, 2007	Mount Lemmon	Mount Lemmon Survey	·	2.7 km	MPC · JPL
753842	2016 EC_{59}	—	October 13, 2002	Palomar	NEAT	EUN	1.4 km	MPC · JPL
753843	2016 EO_{60}	—	February 24, 2006	Kitt Peak	Spacewatch	·	550 m	MPC · JPL
753844	2016 EF_{61}	—	March 23, 2012	Bergisch Gladbach	W. Bickel	·	1.2 km	MPC · JPL
753845	2016 ET_{61}	—	April 18, 2010	WISE	WISE	·	2.6 km	MPC · JPL
753846	2016 EW_{61}	—	January 27, 2004	Kitt Peak	Spacewatch	·	3.0 km	MPC · JPL
753847	2016 EK_{62}	—	February 14, 2016	Haleakala	Pan-STARRS 1	·	2.8 km	MPC · JPL
753848	2016 EM_{62}	—	January 9, 2016	Haleakala	Pan-STARRS 1	TIR	3.1 km	MPC · JPL
753849	2016 EP_{62}	—	February 14, 2016	Haleakala	Pan-STARRS 1	·	2.7 km	MPC · JPL
753850	2016 EA_{63}	—	March 4, 2016	Haleakala	Pan-STARRS 1	·	720 m	MPC · JPL
753851	2016 EO_{63}	—	November 25, 2009	Kitt Peak	Spacewatch	·	2.3 km	MPC · JPL
753852	2016 EA_{73}	—	May 16, 2013	Haleakala	Pan-STARRS 1	·	560 m	MPC · JPL
753853	2016 EZ_{74}	—	November 22, 2014	Haleakala	Pan-STARRS 1	·	1.7 km	MPC · JPL
753854	2016 ED_{79}	—	April 20, 2006	Anderson Mesa	LONEOS	·	630 m	MPC · JPL
753855	2016 EC_{80}	—	March 13, 2012	Kitt Peak	Spacewatch	·	1.7 km	MPC · JPL
753856	2016 EQ_{80}	—	September 27, 2008	Mount Lemmon	Mount Lemmon Survey	·	2.6 km	MPC · JPL
753857	2016 EC_{81}	—	February 28, 2016	Mount Lemmon	Mount Lemmon Survey	·	830 m	MPC · JPL
753858	2016 ER_{82}	—	November 26, 2014	Haleakala	Pan-STARRS 1	·	2.5 km	MPC · JPL
753859	2016 EY_{83}	—	April 6, 2011	Kitt Peak	Spacewatch	·	2.7 km	MPC · JPL
753860	2016 EQ_{86}	—	March 10, 2016	Haleakala	Pan-STARRS 1	H	420 m	MPC · JPL
753861	2016 ES_{86}	—	March 9, 2005	Catalina	CSS	·	990 m	MPC · JPL
753862	2016 ET_{86}	—	December 10, 2010	Kitt Peak	Spacewatch	·	1.9 km	MPC · JPL
753863	2016 EK_{87}	—	January 30, 2011	Haleakala	Pan-STARRS 1	EOS	2.0 km	MPC · JPL
753864	2016 EH_{88}	—	January 8, 2016	Haleakala	Pan-STARRS 1	PHO	1.1 km	MPC · JPL
753865	2016 EM_{93}	—	October 25, 2008	Mount Lemmon	Mount Lemmon Survey	·	2.3 km	MPC · JPL
753866	2016 EG_{94}	—	March 3, 2016	Mount Lemmon	Mount Lemmon Survey	·	2.2 km	MPC · JPL
753867	2016 EK_{94}	—	April 5, 2011	Kitt Peak	Spacewatch	·	2.4 km	MPC · JPL
753868	2016 ER_{94}	—	March 7, 2016	Haleakala	Pan-STARRS 1	·	1.8 km	MPC · JPL
753869	2016 EV_{95}	—	March 7, 2016	Haleakala	Pan-STARRS 1	·	2.4 km	MPC · JPL
753870	2016 EY_{95}	—	May 3, 2013	Haleakala	Pan-STARRS 1	·	530 m	MPC · JPL
753871	2016 EU_{100}	—	October 28, 2008	Kitt Peak	Spacewatch	VER	2.4 km	MPC · JPL
753872	2016 EK_{101}	—	November 26, 2014	Haleakala	Pan-STARRS 1	·	2.0 km	MPC · JPL
753873	2016 EP_{101}	—	March 7, 2016	Haleakala	Pan-STARRS 1	·	1.9 km	MPC · JPL
753874	2016 ER_{101}	—	November 26, 2014	Haleakala	Pan-STARRS 1	·	1.5 km	MPC · JPL
753875	2016 ER_{102}	—	March 2, 2011	Kitt Peak	Spacewatch	·	2.5 km	MPC · JPL
753876	2016 EH_{103}	—	December 22, 2008	Mount Lemmon	Mount Lemmon Survey	·	2.6 km	MPC · JPL
753877	2016 EA_{104}	—	November 2, 2002	La Palma	A. Fitzsimmons	·	2.4 km	MPC · JPL
753878	2016 EL_{104}	—	March 12, 2011	Mount Lemmon	Mount Lemmon Survey	·	1.9 km	MPC · JPL
753879	2016 EN_{105}	—	November 22, 2014	Haleakala	Pan-STARRS 1	EOS	1.4 km	MPC · JPL
753880	2016 EJ_{106}	—	October 3, 2013	Haleakala	Pan-STARRS 1	VER	2.3 km	MPC · JPL
753881	2016 EJ_{108}	—	February 9, 2016	Haleakala	Pan-STARRS 1	THM	1.8 km	MPC · JPL
753882	2016 ES_{108}	—	February 4, 2016	Haleakala	Pan-STARRS 1	URS	2.7 km	MPC · JPL
753883	2016 EW_{108}	—	April 2, 2011	Mount Lemmon	Mount Lemmon Survey	·	2.1 km	MPC · JPL
753884	2016 ER_{111}	—	February 2, 2005	Palomar	NEAT	PHO	940 m	MPC · JPL
753885	2016 EX_{111}	—	January 6, 2006	Mount Lemmon	Mount Lemmon Survey	·	940 m	MPC · JPL
753886	2016 EC_{114}	—	January 19, 2009	Mount Lemmon	Mount Lemmon Survey	PHO	1.1 km	MPC · JPL
753887	2016 EB_{115}	—	December 30, 2007	Kitt Peak	Spacewatch	MAS	630 m	MPC · JPL
753888	2016 EP_{115}	—	April 16, 2013	Haleakala	Pan-STARRS 1	·	560 m	MPC · JPL
753889	2016 EJ_{116}	—	April 2, 2005	Mount Lemmon	Mount Lemmon Survey	·	2.4 km	MPC · JPL
753890	2016 EO_{117}	—	November 20, 2003	Kitt Peak	Deep Ecliptic Survey	NYS	860 m	MPC · JPL
753891	2016 EY_{117}	—	March 1, 2016	Haleakala	Pan-STARRS 1	·	2.4 km	MPC · JPL
753892	2016 ET_{118}	—	March 30, 2011	Mount Lemmon	Mount Lemmon Survey	·	1.6 km	MPC · JPL
753893	2016 ED_{121}	—	June 14, 2007	Kitt Peak	Spacewatch	T_{j} (2.98)	3.4 km	MPC · JPL
753894	2016 EP_{121}	—	August 9, 2013	Haleakala	Pan-STARRS 1	·	1.9 km	MPC · JPL
753895	2016 EU_{123}	—	January 18, 2016	Haleakala	Pan-STARRS 1	·	3.2 km	MPC · JPL
753896	2016 EW_{123}	—	February 4, 2005	Kitt Peak	Spacewatch	·	1.9 km	MPC · JPL
753897	2016 EX_{123}	—	January 8, 2016	Haleakala	Pan-STARRS 1	HYG	2.2 km	MPC · JPL
753898	2016 EC_{124}	—	May 8, 2011	Mount Lemmon	Mount Lemmon Survey	·	2.2 km	MPC · JPL
753899	2016 EM_{129}	—	January 18, 2016	Haleakala	Pan-STARRS 1	·	2.8 km	MPC · JPL
753900	2016 EQ_{130}	—	January 8, 2016	Haleakala	Pan-STARRS 1	·	560 m	MPC · JPL

== 753901–754000 ==
back to top

Designation			Discovery			Properties		Ref
Permanent	Provisional	Named after	Date	Site	Discoverer(s)	Category	Diam.	Ref
753901	2016 EW_{131}	—	August 14, 2012	Haleakala	Pan-STARRS 1	·	2.5 km	MPC · JPL
753902	2016 EY_{131}	—	September 1, 2013	Mount Lemmon	Mount Lemmon Survey	·	2.0 km	MPC · JPL
753903	2016 EC_{132}	—	January 8, 2016	Haleakala	Pan-STARRS 1	·	2.5 km	MPC · JPL
753904	2016 EQ_{133}	—	March 10, 2016	Haleakala	Pan-STARRS 1	·	470 m	MPC · JPL
753905	2016 EB_{135}	—	March 10, 2016	Haleakala	Pan-STARRS 1	·	610 m	MPC · JPL
753906	2016 EH_{136}	—	January 18, 2016	Haleakala	Pan-STARRS 1	·	1.6 km	MPC · JPL
753907	2016 EG_{137}	—	October 8, 2007	Kitt Peak	Spacewatch	·	2.6 km	MPC · JPL
753908	2016 EM_{138}	—	March 19, 2009	Kitt Peak	Spacewatch	·	700 m	MPC · JPL
753909	2016 EX_{138}	—	March 7, 2016	Haleakala	Pan-STARRS 1	·	930 m	MPC · JPL
753910	2016 ET_{141}	—	February 10, 2016	Haleakala	Pan-STARRS 1	·	2.6 km	MPC · JPL
753911	2016 EO_{144}	—	January 18, 2016	Haleakala	Pan-STARRS 1	·	550 m	MPC · JPL
753912	2016 EX_{145}	—	March 20, 2010	Kitt Peak	Spacewatch	T_{j} (2.99) · EUP	2.5 km	MPC · JPL
753913	2016 EH_{146}	—	August 25, 2014	Haleakala	Pan-STARRS 1	·	1.2 km	MPC · JPL
753914	2016 ED_{147}	—	March 2, 2016	Haleakala	Pan-STARRS 1	·	2.6 km	MPC · JPL
753915	2016 EG_{148}	—	December 29, 2011	Mount Lemmon	Mount Lemmon Survey	·	810 m	MPC · JPL
753916	2016 EN_{148}	—	April 21, 2006	Kitt Peak	Spacewatch	·	570 m	MPC · JPL
753917	2016 EZ_{148}	—	October 24, 2013	Mount Lemmon	Mount Lemmon Survey	·	2.5 km	MPC · JPL
753918	2016 ES_{150}	—	December 27, 2014	Haleakala	Pan-STARRS 1	·	2.3 km	MPC · JPL
753919	2016 EW_{158}	—	May 19, 2006	Mount Lemmon	Mount Lemmon Survey	·	570 m	MPC · JPL
753920	2016 EG_{160}	—	March 10, 2016	Haleakala	Pan-STARRS 1	·	690 m	MPC · JPL
753921	2016 EJ_{162}	—	January 18, 2016	Haleakala	Pan-STARRS 1	·	1.9 km	MPC · JPL
753922	2016 EO_{162}	—	February 10, 2016	Haleakala	Pan-STARRS 1	·	2.2 km	MPC · JPL
753923	2016 EO_{163}	—	March 28, 2009	Kitt Peak	Spacewatch	·	800 m	MPC · JPL
753924	2016 ES_{164}	—	February 10, 2016	Haleakala	Pan-STARRS 1	·	1.9 km	MPC · JPL
753925	2016 EM_{167}	—	October 23, 2006	Mount Lemmon	Mount Lemmon Survey	·	940 m	MPC · JPL
753926	2016 EN_{167}	—	November 26, 2014	Haleakala	Pan-STARRS 1	EOS	1.5 km	MPC · JPL
753927	2016 EE_{168}	—	March 13, 2011	Mount Lemmon	Mount Lemmon Survey	·	2.4 km	MPC · JPL
753928	2016 EC_{170}	—	October 21, 2014	Mount Lemmon	Mount Lemmon Survey	·	660 m	MPC · JPL
753929	2016 EV_{171}	—	September 13, 2007	Mount Lemmon	Mount Lemmon Survey	·	2.5 km	MPC · JPL
753930	2016 EL_{174}	—	November 20, 2008	Kitt Peak	Spacewatch	·	2.9 km	MPC · JPL
753931	2016 EK_{175}	—	January 17, 2016	Haleakala	Pan-STARRS 1	JUN	1.1 km	MPC · JPL
753932	2016 ER_{176}	—	March 12, 2016	Haleakala	Pan-STARRS 1	·	2.4 km	MPC · JPL
753933	2016 ES_{177}	—	January 8, 2016	Haleakala	Pan-STARRS 1	·	2.6 km	MPC · JPL
753934	2016 ET_{177}	—	February 11, 2004	Kitt Peak	Spacewatch	·	2.2 km	MPC · JPL
753935	2016 EV_{177}	—	October 14, 2014	Mount Lemmon	Mount Lemmon Survey	·	700 m	MPC · JPL
753936	2016 EH_{180}	—	February 10, 2016	Mount Lemmon	Mount Lemmon Survey	·	2.3 km	MPC · JPL
753937	2016 EA_{183}	—	January 28, 2004	Kitt Peak	Spacewatch	·	3.0 km	MPC · JPL
753938	2016 ER_{188}	—	October 28, 2008	Mount Lemmon	Mount Lemmon Survey	·	2.5 km	MPC · JPL
753939	2016 EL_{189}	—	January 8, 2016	Haleakala	Pan-STARRS 1	·	2.8 km	MPC · JPL
753940	2016 EK_{191}	—	October 19, 2003	Apache Point	SDSS	·	2.1 km	MPC · JPL
753941	2016 EE_{192}	—	November 17, 2014	Haleakala	Pan-STARRS 1	·	1.7 km	MPC · JPL
753942	2016 ET_{192}	—	November 27, 2014	Haleakala	Pan-STARRS 1	ADE	1.7 km	MPC · JPL
753943	2016 ED_{193}	—	December 3, 2014	Haleakala	Pan-STARRS 1	·	1.8 km	MPC · JPL
753944	2016 EP_{195}	—	March 11, 2005	Mount Lemmon	Mount Lemmon Survey	·	2.1 km	MPC · JPL
753945	2016 EL_{196}	—	March 2, 2011	Mount Lemmon	Mount Lemmon Survey	·	1.7 km	MPC · JPL
753946	2016 EA_{197}	—	February 20, 2009	Kitt Peak	Spacewatch	·	680 m	MPC · JPL
753947	2016 EK_{202}	—	February 5, 2016	Haleakala	Pan-STARRS 1	V	470 m	MPC · JPL
753948	2016 EM_{211}	—	September 20, 2001	Socorro	LINEAR	·	2.7 km	MPC · JPL
753949	2016 EQ_{216}	—	March 4, 2005	Mount Lemmon	Mount Lemmon Survey	THM	1.7 km	MPC · JPL
753950	2016 EQ_{220}	—	October 8, 2007	Mount Lemmon	Mount Lemmon Survey	·	2.7 km	MPC · JPL
753951	2016 EX_{220}	—	February 10, 2016	Haleakala	Pan-STARRS 1	HYG	2.4 km	MPC · JPL
753952	2016 EY_{223}	—	December 26, 2014	Haleakala	Pan-STARRS 1	EOS	1.7 km	MPC · JPL
753953	2016 EE_{224}	—	October 31, 2008	Kitt Peak	Spacewatch	·	1.6 km	MPC · JPL
753954	2016 EJ_{225}	—	January 20, 2015	Mount Lemmon	Mount Lemmon Survey	·	2.6 km	MPC · JPL
753955	2016 EN_{226}	—	October 27, 2009	Kitt Peak	Spacewatch	·	1.2 km	MPC · JPL
753956	2016 ET_{227}	—	March 10, 2011	Mount Lemmon	Mount Lemmon Survey	·	2.1 km	MPC · JPL
753957	2016 EN_{228}	—	March 2, 2011	Kitt Peak	Spacewatch	·	2.1 km	MPC · JPL
753958	2016 EQ_{229}	—	October 21, 2008	Mount Lemmon	Mount Lemmon Survey	EOS	1.5 km	MPC · JPL
753959	2016 EE_{232}	—	March 4, 2016	Haleakala	Pan-STARRS 1	ARM	3.4 km	MPC · JPL
753960	2016 EU_{233}	—	September 25, 1998	Apache Point	SDSS	·	1.8 km	MPC · JPL
753961	2016 EB_{234}	—	February 18, 2010	Mount Lemmon	Mount Lemmon Survey	·	2.2 km	MPC · JPL
753962	2016 EG_{234}	—	March 4, 2016	Haleakala	Pan-STARRS 1	TIR	2.1 km	MPC · JPL
753963	2016 EL_{237}	—	October 20, 2008	Kitt Peak	Spacewatch	EOS	1.8 km	MPC · JPL
753964	2016 ET_{238}	—	March 7, 2016	Haleakala	Pan-STARRS 1	·	1.8 km	MPC · JPL
753965	2016 EN_{241}	—	September 4, 2010	Kitt Peak	Spacewatch	·	700 m	MPC · JPL
753966	2016 EC_{242}	—	December 29, 2014	Mount Lemmon	Mount Lemmon Survey	VER	2.1 km	MPC · JPL
753967	2016 EE_{242}	—	March 10, 2016	Haleakala	Pan-STARRS 1	VER	2.2 km	MPC · JPL
753968	2016 EY_{245}	—	August 14, 2013	Haleakala	Pan-STARRS 1	·	2.8 km	MPC · JPL
753969	2016 EZ_{246}	—	October 24, 2008	Kitt Peak	Spacewatch	THM	2.1 km	MPC · JPL
753970	2016 ET_{249}	—	October 2, 2006	Mount Lemmon	Mount Lemmon Survey	·	970 m	MPC · JPL
753971	2016 EK_{252}	—	March 8, 2016	Haleakala	Pan-STARRS 1	TIR	2.1 km	MPC · JPL
753972	2016 EV_{262}	—	April 6, 2011	Mount Lemmon	Mount Lemmon Survey	·	2.6 km	MPC · JPL
753973	2016 EF_{263}	—	March 12, 2016	Haleakala	Pan-STARRS 1	·	690 m	MPC · JPL
753974	2016 EF_{264}	—	March 4, 2016	Haleakala	Pan-STARRS 1	·	2.7 km	MPC · JPL
753975	2016 EK_{265}	—	March 11, 2016	Mount Lemmon	Mount Lemmon Survey	·	1.4 km	MPC · JPL
753976	2016 EQ_{265}	—	March 1, 2016	Mount Lemmon	Mount Lemmon Survey	EOS	1.4 km	MPC · JPL
753977	2016 ER_{265}	—	March 11, 2016	Haleakala	Pan-STARRS 1	EMA	2.5 km	MPC · JPL
753978	2016 EH_{266}	—	March 1, 2016	Haleakala	Pan-STARRS 1	·	2.4 km	MPC · JPL
753979	2016 EJ_{266}	—	March 10, 2016	Haleakala	Pan-STARRS 1	·	2.5 km	MPC · JPL
753980	2016 EU_{267}	—	March 12, 2016	Haleakala	Pan-STARRS 1	·	490 m	MPC · JPL
753981	2016 EE_{268}	—	March 12, 2016	Haleakala	Pan-STARRS 1	·	610 m	MPC · JPL
753982	2016 ER_{270}	—	March 13, 2016	Haleakala	Pan-STARRS 1	·	2.2 km	MPC · JPL
753983	2016 EZ_{272}	—	March 6, 2016	Haleakala	Pan-STARRS 1	·	1.0 km	MPC · JPL
753984	2016 EY_{274}	—	January 17, 2015	Mount Lemmon	Mount Lemmon Survey	·	2.4 km	MPC · JPL
753985	2016 EL_{275}	—	March 11, 2016	Mount Lemmon	Mount Lemmon Survey	·	2.1 km	MPC · JPL
753986	2016 EG_{276}	—	March 13, 2016	Haleakala	Pan-STARRS 1	LIX	2.8 km	MPC · JPL
753987	2016 EQ_{282}	—	March 12, 2016	Haleakala	Pan-STARRS 1	·	2.3 km	MPC · JPL
753988	2016 ET_{282}	—	March 1, 2016	Mount Lemmon	Mount Lemmon Survey	VER	1.9 km	MPC · JPL
753989	2016 EK_{292}	—	March 3, 2016	Haleakala	Pan-STARRS 1	EOS	1.6 km	MPC · JPL
753990	2016 EX_{302}	—	March 12, 2016	Haleakala	Pan-STARRS 1	·	600 m	MPC · JPL
753991	2016 EQ_{311}	—	March 5, 2016	Haleakala	Pan-STARRS 1	·	2.1 km	MPC · JPL
753992	2016 EK_{314}	—	March 3, 2016	Haleakala	Pan-STARRS 1	·	2.4 km	MPC · JPL
753993	2016 EK_{317}	—	March 4, 2016	Haleakala	Pan-STARRS 1	·	2.6 km	MPC · JPL
753994	2016 ER_{334}	—	March 13, 2016	Haleakala	Pan-STARRS 1	·	1.7 km	MPC · JPL
753995	2016 EF_{335}	—	August 17, 2012	Haleakala	Pan-STARRS 1	·	2.2 km	MPC · JPL
753996	2016 EN_{340}	—	March 4, 2016	Haleakala	Pan-STARRS 1	L5	7.3 km	MPC · JPL
753997	2016 FJ_{2}	—	September 23, 2008	Kitt Peak	Spacewatch	·	2.2 km	MPC · JPL
753998	2016 FQ_{5}	—	October 5, 2013	Haleakala	Pan-STARRS 1	EOS	1.5 km	MPC · JPL
753999	2016 FO_{8}	—	January 21, 2012	Catalina	CSS	·	940 m	MPC · JPL
754000	2016 FM_{9}	—	March 15, 2010	Kitt Peak	Spacewatch	THM	2.2 km	MPC · JPL

back to top
