= List of minor planets: 866001–867000 =

The following is a partial list of minor planets, running from minor-planet number 866001 through 867000, inclusive. The primary data for this and other partial lists is based on JPL's "Small-Body Orbital Elements" and data available from the Minor Planet Center. Critical list information is also provided by the MPC, unless otherwise specified from Lowell Observatory. A detailed description of the table's columns and additional sources are given on the main page including a complete list of every page in this series, and a statistical break-up on the dynamical classification of minor planets.

Also see the summary list of all named bodies in numerical and alphabetical order, and the corresponding naming citations for the number range of this particular list. New namings may only be added to this list after official publication, as the preannouncement of names is condemned by the Working Group for Small Bodies Nomenclature of the International Astronomical Union.

Near-Earth obj.	MBA (inner)	MBA (outer)	Centaur
Mars-crosser	MBA (middle)	Jupiter trojan	Trans-Neptunian obj.
Unclassified

== 866001–866100 ==
Designation			Discovery			Properties		Ref
Permanent	Provisional	Named after	Date	Site	Discoverer(s)	Category	Diam.	Ref
866001	2015 OA_{133}	—	July 25, 2015	Haleakala	Pan-STARRS 1	·	1.4 km	MPC · JPL
866002	2015 OK_{133}	—	July 25, 2015	Haleakala	Pan-STARRS 1	·	1.4 km	MPC · JPL
866003	2015 OX_{133}	—	July 24, 2015	Haleakala	Pan-STARRS 1	·	1.4 km	MPC · JPL
866004	2015 OZ_{133}	—	July 25, 2015	Haleakala	Pan-STARRS 1	KOR	940 m	MPC · JPL
866005	2015 OF_{134}	—	July 19, 2015	Haleakala	Pan-STARRS 1	·	1.4 km	MPC · JPL
866006	2015 ON_{134}	—	July 25, 2015	Haleakala	Pan-STARRS 1	KOR	900 m	MPC · JPL
866007	2015 OC_{135}	—	July 28, 2015	Haleakala	Pan-STARRS 1	·	1.9 km	MPC · JPL
866008	2015 OQ_{135}	—	July 25, 2015	Haleakala	Pan-STARRS 1	·	1.3 km	MPC · JPL
866009	2015 OR_{135}	—	July 23, 2015	Haleakala	Pan-STARRS 1	·	1.3 km	MPC · JPL
866010	2015 OB_{136}	—	July 24, 2015	Haleakala	Pan-STARRS 1	·	1.8 km	MPC · JPL
866011	2015 OE_{136}	—	July 25, 2015	Haleakala	Pan-STARRS 1	EOS	1.4 km	MPC · JPL
866012	2015 OR_{136}	—	July 25, 2015	Haleakala	Pan-STARRS 1	·	1.2 km	MPC · JPL
866013	2015 OK_{138}	—	July 19, 2015	Haleakala	Pan-STARRS 1	·	1.6 km	MPC · JPL
866014	2015 OL_{138}	—	July 23, 2015	Haleakala	Pan-STARRS 1	·	1.6 km	MPC · JPL
866015	2015 OX_{138}	—	July 24, 2015	Haleakala	Pan-STARRS 1	·	1.1 km	MPC · JPL
866016	2015 OJ_{140}	—	July 25, 2015	Haleakala	Pan-STARRS 1	·	1.1 km	MPC · JPL
866017	2015 OU_{140}	—	July 25, 2015	Haleakala	Pan-STARRS 1	·	1.2 km	MPC · JPL
866018	2015 OM_{141}	—	July 27, 2015	Haleakala	Pan-STARRS 1	·	1.3 km	MPC · JPL
866019	2015 OK_{142}	—	July 24, 2015	Haleakala	Pan-STARRS 1	·	1.4 km	MPC · JPL
866020	2015 OF_{144}	—	July 25, 2015	Haleakala	Pan-STARRS 1	JUN	760 m	MPC · JPL
866021	2015 OR_{144}	—	July 23, 2015	Haleakala	Pan-STARRS 1	·	810 m	MPC · JPL
866022	2015 OW_{144}	—	July 24, 2015	Haleakala	Pan-STARRS 1	·	580 m	MPC · JPL
866023	2015 ON_{145}	—	July 24, 2015	Haleakala	Pan-STARRS 1	·	440 m	MPC · JPL
866024	2015 OQ_{145}	—	July 23, 2015	Haleakala	Pan-STARRS 1	·	530 m	MPC · JPL
866025	2015 OA_{147}	—	November 11, 2010	Mount Lemmon	Mount Lemmon Survey	·	2.0 km	MPC · JPL
866026	2015 ON_{147}	—	July 25, 2015	Haleakala	Pan-STARRS 1	KOR	860 m	MPC · JPL
866027	2015 OT_{149}	—	July 19, 2015	Haleakala	Pan-STARRS 1	·	1.4 km	MPC · JPL
866028	2015 OD_{155}	—	July 25, 2015	Haleakala	Pan-STARRS 1	·	370 m	MPC · JPL
866029	2015 OO_{155}	—	July 19, 2015	Haleakala	Pan-STARRS 1	·	2.0 km	MPC · JPL
866030	2015 OP_{159}	—	July 27, 2015	Haleakala	Pan-STARRS 1	·	1.4 km	MPC · JPL
866031	2015 OX_{162}	—	January 23, 2014	Mount Lemmon	Mount Lemmon Survey	H	270 m	MPC · JPL
866032	2015 OO_{163}	—	July 19, 2015	Haleakala	Pan-STARRS 1	·	980 m	MPC · JPL
866033	2015 OB_{164}	—	July 23, 2015	Haleakala	Pan-STARRS 1	·	560 m	MPC · JPL
866034	2015 ON_{164}	—	July 24, 2015	Haleakala	Pan-STARRS 1	·	2.0 km	MPC · JPL
866035	2015 OT_{165}	—	July 23, 2015	Haleakala	Pan-STARRS 1	H	320 m	MPC · JPL
866036	2015 OA_{166}	—	July 24, 2015	Haleakala	Pan-STARRS 1	·	1.3 km	MPC · JPL
866037	2015 OW_{167}	—	July 25, 2015	Haleakala	Pan-STARRS 1	·	1.7 km	MPC · JPL
866038	2015 OM_{168}	—	July 23, 2015	Haleakala	Pan-STARRS 1	·	950 m	MPC · JPL
866039	2015 OM_{170}	—	July 19, 2015	Haleakala	Pan-STARRS 1	KOR	890 m	MPC · JPL
866040	2015 OS_{170}	—	July 28, 2015	Haleakala	Pan-STARRS 1	·	1.1 km	MPC · JPL
866041	2015 OE_{173}	—	July 25, 2015	Haleakala	Pan-STARRS 1	·	760 m	MPC · JPL
866042	2015 OB_{177}	—	October 6, 2005	Kitt Peak	Spacewatch	·	420 m	MPC · JPL
866043	2015 OD_{177}	—	July 19, 2015	Haleakala	Pan-STARRS 1	·	400 m	MPC · JPL
866044	2015 OY_{177}	—	July 23, 2015	Haleakala	Pan-STARRS 1	·	490 m	MPC · JPL
866045	2015 OV_{180}	—	July 19, 2015	Haleakala	Pan-STARRS 1	EUN	840 m	MPC · JPL
866046	2015 OG_{181}	—	July 25, 2015	Haleakala	Pan-STARRS 1	·	570 m	MPC · JPL
866047	2015 ON_{181}	—	July 25, 2015	Haleakala	Pan-STARRS 1	·	1.7 km	MPC · JPL
866048	2015 OP_{182}	—	July 24, 2015	Haleakala	Pan-STARRS 1	·	1.5 km	MPC · JPL
866049	2015 OS_{182}	—	July 24, 2015	Haleakala	Pan-STARRS 1	·	780 m	MPC · JPL
866050	2015 ON_{192}	—	March 5, 2013	Haleakala	Pan-STARRS 1	·	1.9 km	MPC · JPL
866051	2015 PL_{1}	—	August 17, 2015	ISON-SSO	L. Elenin	·	1.4 km	MPC · JPL
866052	2015 PQ_{4}	—	July 26, 2001	Kitt Peak	Spacewatch	·	560 m	MPC · JPL
866053	2015 PC_{9}	—	June 20, 2015	Haleakala	Pan-STARRS 1	·	980 m	MPC · JPL
866054	2015 PE_{9}	—	May 3, 2008	Kitt Peak	Spacewatch	·	550 m	MPC · JPL
866055	2015 PX_{11}	—	October 9, 2004	Kitt Peak	Spacewatch	·	900 m	MPC · JPL
866056	2015 PR_{12}	—	October 10, 2012	Mount Lemmon	Mount Lemmon Survey	·	530 m	MPC · JPL
866057	2015 PB_{14}	—	October 8, 2012	Mount Lemmon	Mount Lemmon Survey	·	410 m	MPC · JPL
866058	2015 PK_{16}	—	October 8, 2012	Haleakala	Pan-STARRS 1	·	430 m	MPC · JPL
866059	2015 PA_{17}	—	October 20, 2011	Mount Lemmon	Mount Lemmon Survey	·	1.2 km	MPC · JPL
866060	2015 PD_{18}	—	August 8, 2015	Haleakala	Pan-STARRS 1	EUN	1.0 km	MPC · JPL
866061	2015 PN_{18}	—	January 28, 2007	Mount Lemmon	Mount Lemmon Survey	·	600 m	MPC · JPL
866062	2015 PC_{22}	—	August 8, 2015	Haleakala	Pan-STARRS 1	·	2.1 km	MPC · JPL
866063	2015 PH_{25}	—	August 8, 2015	Haleakala	Pan-STARRS 1	·	1.2 km	MPC · JPL
866064	2015 PM_{26}	—	August 8, 2015	Haleakala	Pan-STARRS 1	BRA	990 m	MPC · JPL
866065	2015 PU_{26}	—	December 23, 2012	Haleakala	Pan-STARRS 1	·	840 m	MPC · JPL
866066	2015 PR_{29}	—	October 19, 2011	Catalina	CSS	·	1.1 km	MPC · JPL
866067	2015 PC_{31}	—	June 2, 2015	Cerro Tololo-DECam	DECam	·	730 m	MPC · JPL
866068	2015 PH_{31}	—	September 23, 2011	Kitt Peak	Spacewatch	·	1.0 km	MPC · JPL
866069	2015 PA_{34}	—	November 18, 2011	Mount Lemmon	Mount Lemmon Survey	·	1.4 km	MPC · JPL
866070	2015 PS_{34}	—	June 12, 2015	Mount Lemmon	Mount Lemmon Survey	·	1.5 km	MPC · JPL
866071	2015 PF_{35}	—	August 9, 2015	Haleakala	Pan-STARRS 1	·	1.1 km	MPC · JPL
866072	2015 PP_{36}	—	October 26, 2008	Mount Lemmon	Mount Lemmon Survey	·	920 m	MPC · JPL
866073	2015 PU_{39}	—	August 9, 2015	Haleakala	Pan-STARRS 1	·	1.4 km	MPC · JPL
866074	2015 PW_{41}	—	May 22, 2011	Mount Lemmon	Mount Lemmon Survey	·	670 m	MPC · JPL
866075	2015 PU_{42}	—	August 24, 2011	Haleakala	Pan-STARRS 1	·	940 m	MPC · JPL
866076	2015 PP_{47}	—	August 9, 2015	Haleakala	Pan-STARRS 1	·	1.2 km	MPC · JPL
866077	2015 PQ_{47}	—	December 2, 2012	Mount Lemmon	Mount Lemmon Survey	·	430 m	MPC · JPL
866078	2015 PL_{49}	—	October 20, 2012	Haleakala	Pan-STARRS 1	·	480 m	MPC · JPL
866079	2015 PM_{49}	—	July 24, 2015	Haleakala	Pan-STARRS 1	·	1.1 km	MPC · JPL
866080	2015 PG_{50}	—	July 28, 2015	Haleakala	Pan-STARRS 1	·	1.3 km	MPC · JPL
866081	2015 PL_{51}	—	August 9, 2015	Haleakala	Pan-STARRS 1	·	1.1 km	MPC · JPL
866082	2015 PF_{55}	—	August 9, 2015	Haleakala	Pan-STARRS 1	ADE	1.4 km	MPC · JPL
866083	2015 PT_{55}	—	August 9, 2015	Haleakala	Pan-STARRS 1	·	520 m	MPC · JPL
866084	2015 PJ_{57}	—	June 29, 2015	Haleakala	Pan-STARRS 1	H	310 m	MPC · JPL
866085	2015 PD_{60}	—	November 1, 2008	Mount Lemmon	Mount Lemmon Survey	·	890 m	MPC · JPL
866086	2015 PL_{60}	—	April 15, 2008	Kitt Peak	Spacewatch	·	400 m	MPC · JPL
866087	2015 PV_{60}	—	October 8, 2012	Haleakala	Pan-STARRS 1	·	480 m	MPC · JPL
866088	2015 PW_{60}	—	June 17, 2015	Haleakala	Pan-STARRS 1	·	560 m	MPC · JPL
866089	2015 PR_{62}	—	November 2, 2011	Mount Lemmon	Mount Lemmon Survey	·	1.1 km	MPC · JPL
866090	2015 PE_{63}	—	September 22, 2011	Kitt Peak	Spacewatch	AGN	810 m	MPC · JPL
866091	2015 PO_{66}	—	October 15, 2012	Mount Lemmon	Mount Lemmon Survey	·	520 m	MPC · JPL
866092	2015 PR_{66}	—	January 10, 2013	Haleakala	Pan-STARRS 1	·	940 m	MPC · JPL
866093	2015 PW_{69}	—	June 26, 2015	Haleakala	Pan-STARRS 1	·	1.4 km	MPC · JPL
866094	2015 PR_{70}	—	September 30, 2003	Kitt Peak	Spacewatch	·	900 m	MPC · JPL
866095	2015 PY_{75}	—	September 6, 2008	Mount Lemmon	Mount Lemmon Survey	MAS	470 m	MPC · JPL
866096	2015 PB_{77}	—	June 26, 2015	Haleakala	Pan-STARRS 1	·	1.1 km	MPC · JPL
866097	2015 PT_{77}	—	July 27, 2015	Haleakala	Pan-STARRS 1	·	1.1 km	MPC · JPL
866098	2015 PC_{82}	—	August 10, 2015	Haleakala	Pan-STARRS 1	·	1.4 km	MPC · JPL
866099	2015 PD_{88}	—	November 9, 2008	Kitt Peak	Spacewatch	·	850 m	MPC · JPL
866100	2015 PE_{88}	—	January 20, 2013	Kitt Peak	Spacewatch	·	1.4 km	MPC · JPL

== 866101–866200 ==
back to top

Designation			Discovery			Properties		Ref
Permanent	Provisional	Named after	Date	Site	Discoverer(s)	Category	Diam.	Ref
866101	2015 PD_{89}	—	August 29, 2006	Kitt Peak	Spacewatch	·	1.4 km	MPC · JPL
866102	2015 PS_{89}	—	October 18, 2012	Haleakala	Pan-STARRS 1	·	410 m	MPC · JPL
866103	2015 PT_{89}	—	August 10, 2015	Haleakala	Pan-STARRS 1	NYS	660 m	MPC · JPL
866104	2015 PD_{90}	—	October 21, 2007	Kitt Peak	Spacewatch	·	1.1 km	MPC · JPL
866105	2015 PE_{91}	—	August 10, 2015	Haleakala	Pan-STARRS 1	·	910 m	MPC · JPL
866106	2015 PL_{91}	—	August 31, 2005	Palomar	NEAT	·	490 m	MPC · JPL
866107	2015 PZ_{94}	—	February 1, 2012	Mount Lemmon	Mount Lemmon Survey	·	2.2 km	MPC · JPL
866108	2015 PD_{96}	—	July 25, 2015	Haleakala	Pan-STARRS 1	(7744)	1.0 km	MPC · JPL
866109	2015 PQ_{97}	—	July 25, 2015	Haleakala	Pan-STARRS 1	·	1.4 km	MPC · JPL
866110	2015 PV_{97}	—	January 26, 2012	Mount Lemmon	Mount Lemmon Survey	·	1.6 km	MPC · JPL
866111	2015 PA_{98}	—	August 10, 2015	Haleakala	Pan-STARRS 1	V	430 m	MPC · JPL
866112	2015 PG_{99}	—	July 19, 2015	Haleakala	Pan-STARRS 2	·	490 m	MPC · JPL
866113	2015 PH_{99}	—	August 10, 2015	Haleakala	Pan-STARRS 1	·	1.0 km	MPC · JPL
866114	2015 PX_{101}	—	January 19, 2013	Kitt Peak	Spacewatch	GEF	840 m	MPC · JPL
866115	2015 PY_{103}	—	June 22, 2015	Haleakala	Pan-STARRS 1	·	1.3 km	MPC · JPL
866116	2015 PM_{104}	—	March 6, 2011	Mount Lemmon	Mount Lemmon Survey	·	420 m	MPC · JPL
866117	2015 PY_{106}	—	July 27, 2015	Haleakala	Pan-STARRS 1	·	440 m	MPC · JPL
866118	2015 PZ_{108}	—	August 10, 2015	Haleakala	Pan-STARRS 1	KOR	890 m	MPC · JPL
866119	2015 PW_{111}	—	September 24, 2008	Kitt Peak	Spacewatch	·	690 m	MPC · JPL
866120	2015 PQ_{115}	—	February 28, 2014	Haleakala	Pan-STARRS 1	·	1.3 km	MPC · JPL
866121	2015 PZ_{117}	—	August 10, 2015	Haleakala	Pan-STARRS 1	·	660 m	MPC · JPL
866122	2015 PX_{122}	—	August 10, 2015	Haleakala	Pan-STARRS 1	·	840 m	MPC · JPL
866123	2015 PF_{123}	—	August 10, 2015	Haleakala	Pan-STARRS 1	·	1.4 km	MPC · JPL
866124	2015 PJ_{125}	—	January 18, 2013	Mount Lemmon	Mount Lemmon Survey	·	860 m	MPC · JPL
866125	2015 PY_{127}	—	August 10, 2015	Haleakala	Pan-STARRS 1	·	490 m	MPC · JPL
866126	2015 PD_{129}	—	May 8, 2014	Haleakala	Pan-STARRS 1	AST	1.3 km	MPC · JPL
866127	2015 PF_{130}	—	August 10, 2015	Haleakala	Pan-STARRS 1	·	460 m	MPC · JPL
866128	2015 PE_{131}	—	August 10, 2015	Haleakala	Pan-STARRS 1	·	840 m	MPC · JPL
866129	2015 PU_{132}	—	August 10, 2015	Haleakala	Pan-STARRS 1	AGN	810 m	MPC · JPL
866130	2015 PX_{135}	—	August 10, 2015	Haleakala	Pan-STARRS 1	AGN	910 m	MPC · JPL
866131	2015 PY_{136}	—	October 23, 2008	Kitt Peak	Spacewatch	MAS	490 m	MPC · JPL
866132	2015 PK_{138}	—	August 10, 2015	Haleakala	Pan-STARRS 1	·	860 m	MPC · JPL
866133	2015 PY_{138}	—	February 28, 2014	Haleakala	Pan-STARRS 1	·	1.3 km	MPC · JPL
866134	2015 PH_{141}	—	September 23, 2011	Haleakala	Pan-STARRS 1	NEM	1.5 km	MPC · JPL
866135	2015 PC_{147}	—	August 10, 2015	Haleakala	Pan-STARRS 1	·	2.2 km	MPC · JPL
866136	2015 PE_{147}	—	August 10, 2015	Haleakala	Pan-STARRS 1	·	930 m	MPC · JPL
866137	2015 PA_{155}	—	July 24, 2015	Haleakala	Pan-STARRS 1	·	1.0 km	MPC · JPL
866138	2015 PG_{155}	—	July 24, 2015	Haleakala	Pan-STARRS 1	·	1.1 km	MPC · JPL
866139	2015 PL_{155}	—	February 28, 2014	Haleakala	Pan-STARRS 1	·	1.5 km	MPC · JPL
866140	2015 PZ_{157}	—	July 24, 2015	Haleakala	Pan-STARRS 1	·	1.4 km	MPC · JPL
866141	2015 PZ_{158}	—	August 10, 2015	Haleakala	Pan-STARRS 1	·	1.3 km	MPC · JPL
866142	2015 PV_{162}	—	July 24, 2015	Haleakala	Pan-STARRS 1	·	1.3 km	MPC · JPL
866143	2015 PW_{163}	—	August 24, 2011	Haleakala	Pan-STARRS 1	·	1.0 km	MPC · JPL
866144	2015 PZ_{163}	—	August 10, 2015	Haleakala	Pan-STARRS 1	·	460 m	MPC · JPL
866145	2015 PG_{164}	—	August 10, 2015	Haleakala	Pan-STARRS 1	·	700 m	MPC · JPL
866146	2015 PP_{165}	—	August 10, 2015	Haleakala	Pan-STARRS 1	·	2.0 km	MPC · JPL
866147	2015 PO_{167}	—	October 23, 2012	Haleakala	Pan-STARRS 1	(2076)	450 m	MPC · JPL
866148	2015 PC_{170}	—	November 18, 2008	Kitt Peak	Spacewatch	MAS	610 m	MPC · JPL
866149	2015 PF_{176}	—	August 10, 2015	Haleakala	Pan-STARRS 1	·	510 m	MPC · JPL
866150	2015 PW_{176}	—	July 19, 2015	Haleakala	Pan-STARRS 2	·	830 m	MPC · JPL
866151	2015 PC_{178}	—	August 10, 2015	Haleakala	Pan-STARRS 1	·	540 m	MPC · JPL
866152	2015 PE_{180}	—	August 10, 2015	Haleakala	Pan-STARRS 1	·	1.2 km	MPC · JPL
866153	2015 PV_{181}	—	September 28, 2011	Mount Lemmon	Mount Lemmon Survey	·	1.1 km	MPC · JPL
866154	2015 PH_{183}	—	August 10, 2015	Haleakala	Pan-STARRS 1	·	1.3 km	MPC · JPL
866155	2015 PH_{184}	—	February 1, 2006	Mount Lemmon	Mount Lemmon Survey	H	330 m	MPC · JPL
866156	2015 PQ_{184}	—	October 24, 2011	Kitt Peak	Spacewatch	HOF	1.9 km	MPC · JPL
866157	2015 PA_{186}	—	July 24, 2015	Haleakala	Pan-STARRS 1	·	1.3 km	MPC · JPL
866158	2015 PY_{187}	—	June 17, 2015	Haleakala	Pan-STARRS 1	·	1.2 km	MPC · JPL
866159	2015 PL_{189}	—	October 9, 2010	Catalina	CSS	TIR	2.2 km	MPC · JPL
866160	2015 PT_{190}	—	October 16, 2012	Mount Lemmon	Mount Lemmon Survey	·	520 m	MPC · JPL
866161	2015 PV_{190}	—	August 10, 2015	Haleakala	Pan-STARRS 1	·	780 m	MPC · JPL
866162	2015 PO_{192}	—	May 7, 2014	Haleakala	Pan-STARRS 1	EOS	1.3 km	MPC · JPL
866163	2015 PV_{192}	—	December 31, 2007	Mount Lemmon	Mount Lemmon Survey	·	1.4 km	MPC · JPL
866164	2015 PP_{193}	—	March 24, 2014	Haleakala	Pan-STARRS 1	·	1.5 km	MPC · JPL
866165	2015 PR_{195}	—	December 27, 2011	Mount Lemmon	Mount Lemmon Survey	·	1.9 km	MPC · JPL
866166	2015 PL_{196}	—	August 10, 2015	Haleakala	Pan-STARRS 1	·	1.3 km	MPC · JPL
866167	2015 PZ_{197}	—	July 24, 2015	Haleakala	Pan-STARRS 1	·	1.2 km	MPC · JPL
866168	2015 PG_{200}	—	August 10, 2015	Haleakala	Pan-STARRS 1	·	740 m	MPC · JPL
866169	2015 PJ_{203}	—	July 24, 2015	Haleakala	Pan-STARRS 1	·	1.4 km	MPC · JPL
866170	2015 PG_{204}	—	October 26, 2011	Haleakala	Pan-STARRS 1	·	1.6 km	MPC · JPL
866171	2015 PP_{204}	—	May 4, 2014	Haleakala	Pan-STARRS 1	EOS	1.1 km	MPC · JPL
866172	2015 PY_{207}	—	October 26, 2011	Haleakala	Pan-STARRS 1	BRA	1.1 km	MPC · JPL
866173	2015 PS_{210}	—	December 3, 2007	Kitt Peak	Spacewatch	·	1.3 km	MPC · JPL
866174	2015 PY_{214}	—	November 4, 2007	Mount Lemmon	Mount Lemmon Survey	·	1.2 km	MPC · JPL
866175	2015 PR_{215}	—	August 10, 2015	Haleakala	Pan-STARRS 1	·	1.3 km	MPC · JPL
866176	2015 PN_{219}	—	August 10, 2015	Haleakala	Pan-STARRS 1	EUN	980 m	MPC · JPL
866177	2015 PS_{220}	—	August 10, 2015	Haleakala	Pan-STARRS 1	·	1.1 km	MPC · JPL
866178	2015 PN_{221}	—	July 25, 2015	Haleakala	Pan-STARRS 1	·	1.6 km	MPC · JPL
866179	2015 PF_{223}	—	August 10, 2015	Haleakala	Pan-STARRS 1	PHO	750 m	MPC · JPL
866180	2015 PX_{228}	—	August 12, 2015	Haleakala	Pan-STARRS 1	H	310 m	MPC · JPL
866181	2015 PH_{230}	—	September 27, 2002	Palomar	NEAT	JUN	840 m	MPC · JPL
866182	2015 PZ_{231}	—	January 15, 2008	Kitt Peak	Spacewatch	·	1.6 km	MPC · JPL
866183	2015 PE_{232}	—	July 9, 2015	Haleakala	Pan-STARRS 1	(5)	840 m	MPC · JPL
866184	2015 PA_{233}	—	October 11, 2007	Kitt Peak	Spacewatch	·	800 m	MPC · JPL
866185	2015 PV_{234}	—	October 9, 2010	Mount Lemmon	Mount Lemmon Survey	THM	1.4 km	MPC · JPL
866186	2015 PS_{236}	—	July 19, 2015	Haleakala	Pan-STARRS 1	KOR	910 m	MPC · JPL
866187	2015 PA_{237}	—	June 23, 2015	Haleakala	Pan-STARRS 1	·	1.2 km	MPC · JPL
866188	2015 PL_{237}	—	January 1, 2009	Mount Lemmon	Mount Lemmon Survey	·	1.6 km	MPC · JPL
866189	2015 PN_{237}	—	September 17, 2010	Catalina	CSS	·	2.7 km	MPC · JPL
866190	2015 PQ_{237}	—	July 18, 2015	Haleakala	Pan-STARRS 1	·	790 m	MPC · JPL
866191	2015 PN_{240}	—	March 13, 2011	Mount Lemmon	Mount Lemmon Survey	·	550 m	MPC · JPL
866192	2015 PS_{251}	—	August 10, 2015	Haleakala	Pan-STARRS 1	·	750 m	MPC · JPL
866193	2015 PX_{252}	—	October 12, 2007	Mount Lemmon	Mount Lemmon Survey	·	1.1 km	MPC · JPL
866194	2015 PQ_{254}	—	June 4, 2015	Haleakala	Pan-STARRS 1	PHO	750 m	MPC · JPL
866195	2015 PF_{257}	—	June 26, 2015	Haleakala	Pan-STARRS 1	·	1.6 km	MPC · JPL
866196	2015 PZ_{257}	—	August 11, 2015	Haleakala	Pan-STARRS 1	·	1.4 km	MPC · JPL
866197	2015 PR_{261}	—	August 11, 2015	Haleakala	Pan-STARRS 1	NEM	1.5 km	MPC · JPL
866198	2015 PG_{262}	—	October 10, 2007	Kitt Peak	Spacewatch	·	940 m	MPC · JPL
866199	2015 PR_{262}	—	July 25, 2015	Haleakala	Pan-STARRS 1	·	1.2 km	MPC · JPL
866200	2015 PW_{264}	—	January 1, 2012	Mount Lemmon	Mount Lemmon Survey	·	1.6 km	MPC · JPL

== 866201–866300 ==
back to top

Designation			Discovery			Properties		Ref
Permanent	Provisional	Named after	Date	Site	Discoverer(s)	Category	Diam.	Ref
866201	2015 PX_{264}	—	June 18, 2015	Haleakala	Pan-STARRS 1	·	760 m	MPC · JPL
866202	2015 PX_{265}	—	September 29, 2005	Kitt Peak	Spacewatch	V	420 m	MPC · JPL
866203	2015 PA_{267}	—	July 25, 2015	Haleakala	Pan-STARRS 1	·	920 m	MPC · JPL
866204	2015 PO_{268}	—	August 11, 2015	Haleakala	Pan-STARRS 1	·	780 m	MPC · JPL
866205	2015 PM_{269}	—	November 2, 2008	Mount Lemmon	Mount Lemmon Survey	T_{j} (2.97) · 3:2	3.0 km	MPC · JPL
866206	2015 PO_{271}	—	December 7, 2012	Kitt Peak	Spacewatch	·	550 m	MPC · JPL
866207	2015 PZ_{273}	—	April 30, 2014	Haleakala	Pan-STARRS 1	·	1.1 km	MPC · JPL
866208	2015 PJ_{274}	—	September 30, 2011	Mount Lemmon	Mount Lemmon Survey	DOR	1.7 km	MPC · JPL
866209	2015 PY_{275}	—	January 10, 2013	Kitt Peak	Spacewatch	HNS	760 m	MPC · JPL
866210	2015 PC_{277}	—	December 17, 2007	Mount Lemmon	Mount Lemmon Survey	·	1.3 km	MPC · JPL
866211	2015 PD_{281}	—	July 24, 2015	Haleakala	Pan-STARRS 1	TIR	2.1 km	MPC · JPL
866212	2015 PN_{283}	—	July 24, 2015	Haleakala	Pan-STARRS 1	BRA	1.1 km	MPC · JPL
866213	2015 PW_{284}	—	March 28, 2011	Kitt Peak	Spacewatch	·	650 m	MPC · JPL
866214	2015 PQ_{286}	—	August 12, 2015	Haleakala	Pan-STARRS 1	·	1.2 km	MPC · JPL
866215	2015 PX_{293}	—	July 23, 2015	Haleakala	Pan-STARRS 1	·	860 m	MPC · JPL
866216	2015 PG_{297}	—	October 22, 2012	Haleakala	Pan-STARRS 1	·	480 m	MPC · JPL
866217	2015 PO_{297}	—	July 24, 2015	Haleakala	Pan-STARRS 1	·	1.1 km	MPC · JPL
866218	2015 PT_{297}	—	August 13, 2015	Haleakala	Pan-STARRS 1	·	2.2 km	MPC · JPL
866219	2015 PS_{299}	—	June 3, 2011	Mount Lemmon	Mount Lemmon Survey	NYS	930 m	MPC · JPL
866220	2015 PG_{300}	—	July 24, 2015	Haleakala	Pan-STARRS 1	·	1.3 km	MPC · JPL
866221	2015 PB_{301}	—	August 13, 2015	Haleakala	Pan-STARRS 1	·	1.3 km	MPC · JPL
866222	2015 PR_{301}	—	June 25, 2015	Haleakala	Pan-STARRS 1	·	510 m	MPC · JPL
866223	2015 PU_{301}	—	July 24, 2015	Haleakala	Pan-STARRS 1	BRA	1.0 km	MPC · JPL
866224	2015 PL_{304}	—	July 24, 2015	Haleakala	Pan-STARRS 1	·	440 m	MPC · JPL
866225	2015 PK_{307}	—	October 25, 2011	Kitt Peak	Spacewatch	·	840 m	MPC · JPL
866226	2015 PN_{312}	—	January 23, 2014	Catalina	CSS	H	490 m	MPC · JPL
866227	2015 PQ_{313}	—	August 12, 2015	Haleakala	Pan-STARRS 1	·	1.5 km	MPC · JPL
866228	2015 PW_{315}	—	September 29, 2011	Kitt Peak	Spacewatch	·	910 m	MPC · JPL
866229	2015 PL_{317}	—	February 15, 2013	Haleakala	Pan-STARRS 1	·	1.5 km	MPC · JPL
866230	2015 PQ_{317}	—	May 8, 2014	Haleakala	Pan-STARRS 1	KOR	950 m	MPC · JPL
866231	2015 PR_{317}	—	September 29, 2011	Mount Lemmon	Mount Lemmon Survey	·	1.1 km	MPC · JPL
866232	2015 PN_{318}	—	August 9, 2015	Haleakala	Pan-STARRS 1	·	3.1 km	MPC · JPL
866233	2015 PT_{318}	—	November 16, 2006	Kitt Peak	Spacewatch	KOR	970 m	MPC · JPL
866234	2015 PU_{318}	—	August 9, 2015	Haleakala	Pan-STARRS 1	·	1.3 km	MPC · JPL
866235	2015 PZ_{318}	—	August 9, 2015	Haleakala	Pan-STARRS 1	EOS	1.2 km	MPC · JPL
866236	2015 PK_{319}	—	November 2, 2010	Mount Lemmon	Mount Lemmon Survey	·	1.2 km	MPC · JPL
866237	2015 PY_{321}	—	July 24, 2015	Haleakala	Pan-STARRS 1	MAR	750 m	MPC · JPL
866238	2015 PH_{322}	—	October 17, 2010	Mount Lemmon	Mount Lemmon Survey	·	1.9 km	MPC · JPL
866239	2015 PQ_{322}	—	May 7, 2014	Haleakala	Pan-STARRS 1	·	1.3 km	MPC · JPL
866240	2015 PU_{322}	—	February 14, 2013	Haleakala	Pan-STARRS 1	KOR	870 m	MPC · JPL
866241	2015 PW_{322}	—	September 30, 2011	Kitt Peak	Spacewatch	·	1.1 km	MPC · JPL
866242	2015 PX_{322}	—	August 14, 2015	Haleakala	Pan-STARRS 1	KOR	1.1 km	MPC · JPL
866243	2015 PM_{323}	—	September 23, 2005	Catalina	CSS	·	550 m	MPC · JPL
866244	2015 PC_{324}	—	August 12, 2015	Haleakala	Pan-STARRS 1	·	2.3 km	MPC · JPL
866245	2015 PF_{324}	—	August 11, 2015	Haleakala	Pan-STARRS 1	·	1.2 km	MPC · JPL
866246	2015 PH_{324}	—	August 10, 2015	Haleakala	Pan-STARRS 1	BRA	940 m	MPC · JPL
866247	2015 PW_{324}	—	August 12, 2015	Haleakala	Pan-STARRS 1	·	890 m	MPC · JPL
866248	2015 PA_{326}	—	August 8, 2015	Haleakala	Pan-STARRS 1	·	1.3 km	MPC · JPL
866249	2015 PV_{328}	—	August 14, 2015	Haleakala	Pan-STARRS 1	·	1.2 km	MPC · JPL
866250	2015 PO_{330}	—	August 9, 2015	Haleakala	Pan-STARRS 1	·	1.3 km	MPC · JPL
866251	2015 PD_{332}	—	August 14, 2015	Haleakala	Pan-STARRS 1	·	2.5 km	MPC · JPL
866252	2015 PB_{333}	—	August 9, 2015	Haleakala	Pan-STARRS 1	·	2.4 km	MPC · JPL
866253	2015 PQ_{333}	—	August 9, 2015	Haleakala	Pan-STARRS 1	TRE	1.5 km	MPC · JPL
866254	2015 PS_{334}	—	August 10, 2015	Haleakala	Pan-STARRS 1	·	1.3 km	MPC · JPL
866255	2015 PP_{335}	—	August 7, 2015	Haleakala	Pan-STARRS 1	·	1.4 km	MPC · JPL
866256	2015 PS_{336}	—	August 14, 2015	Haleakala	Pan-STARRS 1	·	1.1 km	MPC · JPL
866257	2015 PJ_{337}	—	August 11, 2015	Haleakala	Pan-STARRS 1	·	1.3 km	MPC · JPL
866258	2015 PM_{337}	—	August 12, 2015	Haleakala	Pan-STARRS 1	·	360 m	MPC · JPL
866259	2015 PB_{338}	—	August 10, 2015	Haleakala	Pan-STARRS 1	·	1.6 km	MPC · JPL
866260	2015 PX_{339}	—	August 9, 2015	Haleakala	Pan-STARRS 1	·	1.2 km	MPC · JPL
866261	2015 PS_{340}	—	August 9, 2015	Haleakala	Pan-STARRS 1	·	870 m	MPC · JPL
866262	2015 PX_{340}	—	August 14, 2015	Haleakala	Pan-STARRS 1	·	1.6 km	MPC · JPL
866263	2015 PO_{341}	—	August 14, 2015	Haleakala	Pan-STARRS 1	KOR	930 m	MPC · JPL
866264	2015 PZ_{341}	—	August 11, 2015	Haleakala	Pan-STARRS 1	·	810 m	MPC · JPL
866265	2015 PS_{342}	—	August 11, 2015	Haleakala	Pan-STARRS 1	·	490 m	MPC · JPL
866266	2015 PN_{343}	—	August 14, 2015	Haleakala	Pan-STARRS 1	·	450 m	MPC · JPL
866267	2015 PQ_{343}	—	August 13, 2015	Haleakala	Pan-STARRS 1	·	520 m	MPC · JPL
866268	2015 PE_{344}	—	August 14, 2015	Haleakala	Pan-STARRS 1	·	1.3 km	MPC · JPL
866269	2015 PV_{344}	—	August 11, 2015	Haleakala	Pan-STARRS 1	·	1.1 km	MPC · JPL
866270	2015 PN_{345}	—	August 13, 2015	Kitt Peak	Spacewatch	·	660 m	MPC · JPL
866271	2015 PD_{346}	—	August 10, 2015	Haleakala	Pan-STARRS 1	EOS	1.1 km	MPC · JPL
866272	2015 PL_{346}	—	August 13, 2015	Haleakala	Pan-STARRS 1	·	470 m	MPC · JPL
866273	2015 PK_{350}	—	August 10, 2015	Haleakala	Pan-STARRS 1	·	1.6 km	MPC · JPL
866274	2015 PH_{352}	—	August 12, 2015	Haleakala	Pan-STARRS 1	·	1.9 km	MPC · JPL
866275	2015 PT_{355}	—	September 8, 2011	Kitt Peak	Spacewatch	MIS	1.5 km	MPC · JPL
866276	2015 PQ_{356}	—	August 11, 2015	Haleakala	Pan-STARRS 1	·	1.2 km	MPC · JPL
866277	2015 PZ_{356}	—	August 12, 2015	Haleakala	Pan-STARRS 1	·	630 m	MPC · JPL
866278	2015 PX_{362}	—	August 9, 2015	Haleakala	Pan-STARRS 1	·	400 m	MPC · JPL
866279	2015 PL_{363}	—	August 11, 2015	Haleakala	Pan-STARRS 1	·	450 m	MPC · JPL
866280	2015 PF_{364}	—	August 12, 2015	Haleakala	Pan-STARRS 1	·	1.5 km	MPC · JPL
866281	2015 PJ_{369}	—	August 10, 2015	Haleakala	Pan-STARRS 1	·	1.2 km	MPC · JPL
866282	2015 QS	—	November 24, 2000	Kitt Peak	Deep Lens Survey	TIR	1.8 km	MPC · JPL
866283	2015 QN_{4}	—	December 23, 2012	Haleakala	Pan-STARRS 1	·	1.2 km	MPC · JPL
866284	2015 QO_{4}	—	October 10, 2005	Catalina	CSS	·	550 m	MPC · JPL
866285	2015 QZ_{4}	—	June 27, 2015	Haleakala	Pan-STARRS 1	·	420 m	MPC · JPL
866286	2015 QC_{5}	—	June 27, 2011	Mount Lemmon	Mount Lemmon Survey	·	740 m	MPC · JPL
866287	2015 QH_{11}	—	December 9, 2010	Kitt Peak	Spacewatch	·	2.4 km	MPC · JPL
866288	2015 QV_{11}	—	November 5, 2010	Catalina	CSS	H	530 m	MPC · JPL
866289	2015 QC_{13}	—	November 12, 2006	Mount Lemmon	Mount Lemmon Survey	KOR	1.0 km	MPC · JPL
866290	2015 QS_{15}	—	August 20, 2015	Kitt Peak	Spacewatch	EOS	1.2 km	MPC · JPL
866291	2015 QF_{20}	—	August 21, 2015	Haleakala	Pan-STARRS 1	·	480 m	MPC · JPL
866292	2015 QQ_{22}	—	August 21, 2015	Haleakala	Pan-STARRS 1	·	500 m	MPC · JPL
866293	2015 QC_{25}	—	August 21, 2015	Haleakala	Pan-STARRS 1	·	690 m	MPC · JPL
866294	2015 QN_{25}	—	August 28, 2015	Haleakala	Pan-STARRS 1	EUP	3.1 km	MPC · JPL
866295	2015 QB_{26}	—	August 21, 2015	Haleakala	Pan-STARRS 1	·	1.1 km	MPC · JPL
866296	2015 QK_{26}	—	August 20, 2015	Kitt Peak	Spacewatch	·	1.6 km	MPC · JPL
866297	2015 QT_{26}	—	October 24, 2011	Haleakala	Pan-STARRS 1	·	1.5 km	MPC · JPL
866298	2015 QW_{26}	—	August 21, 2015	Haleakala	Pan-STARRS 1	·	440 m	MPC · JPL
866299	2015 QV_{27}	—	August 21, 2015	Haleakala	Pan-STARRS 1	·	1.3 km	MPC · JPL
866300	2015 QF_{28}	—	August 24, 2015	Cerro Paranal	Gaia Ground Based Optical Tracking	·	1.4 km	MPC · JPL

== 866301–866400 ==
back to top

Designation			Discovery			Properties		Ref
Permanent	Provisional	Named after	Date	Site	Discoverer(s)	Category	Diam.	Ref
866301	2015 QH_{29}	—	August 21, 2015	Haleakala	Pan-STARRS 1	·	1.3 km	MPC · JPL
866302	2015 QZ_{29}	—	September 30, 2006	Kitt Peak	Spacewatch	·	1.3 km	MPC · JPL
866303	2015 QA_{30}	—	August 21, 2015	Haleakala	Pan-STARRS 1	·	1.3 km	MPC · JPL
866304	2015 QO_{30}	—	August 19, 2015	Kitt Peak	Spacewatch	·	910 m	MPC · JPL
866305	2015 QG_{31}	—	August 21, 2015	Haleakala	Pan-STARRS 1	·	1.2 km	MPC · JPL
866306	2015 QH_{37}	—	August 21, 2015	Haleakala	Pan-STARRS 1	·	1.3 km	MPC · JPL
866307	2015 QN_{37}	—	August 28, 2015	Haleakala	Pan-STARRS 1	·	470 m	MPC · JPL
866308	2015 QW_{41}	—	August 21, 2015	Haleakala	Pan-STARRS 1	AST	1.3 km	MPC · JPL
866309	2015 QH_{43}	—	August 21, 2015	Haleakala	Pan-STARRS 1	WIT	630 m	MPC · JPL
866310	2015 RU_{5}	—	September 21, 2011	Kitt Peak	Spacewatch	·	1.3 km	MPC · JPL
866311	2015 RX_{5}	—	July 14, 2015	Haleakala	Pan-STARRS 1	·	480 m	MPC · JPL
866312	2015 RP_{6}	—	February 25, 2011	Mount Lemmon	Mount Lemmon Survey	·	500 m	MPC · JPL
866313	2015 RG_{7}	—	June 30, 2015	Haleakala	Pan-STARRS 1	NYS	970 m	MPC · JPL
866314	2015 RR_{7}	—	January 17, 2013	Haleakala	Pan-STARRS 1	·	1.1 km	MPC · JPL
866315	2015 RA_{9}	—	August 17, 2015	ISON-SSO	L. Elenin	·	1.6 km	MPC · JPL
866316	2015 RC_{11}	—	July 12, 2015	Haleakala	Pan-STARRS 1	BRA	1.1 km	MPC · JPL
866317	2015 RG_{12}	—	September 14, 2002	Palomar Mountain	NEAT	MIS	1.7 km	MPC · JPL
866318	2015 RP_{16}	—	February 28, 2014	Haleakala	Pan-STARRS 1	JUN	820 m	MPC · JPL
866319	2015 RH_{19}	—	September 18, 2001	Anderson Mesa	LONEOS	·	1.4 km	MPC · JPL
866320	2015 RM_{22}	—	October 4, 2006	Mount Lemmon	Mount Lemmon Survey	KOR	1.0 km	MPC · JPL
866321	2015 RR_{23}	—	September 6, 2015	Kitt Peak	Spacewatch	·	770 m	MPC · JPL
866322	2015 RP_{25}	—	October 21, 2011	Mount Lemmon	Mount Lemmon Survey	·	1.1 km	MPC · JPL
866323	2015 RD_{27}	—	November 7, 1998	Caussols	ODAS	·	1.0 km	MPC · JPL
866324	2015 RO_{31}	—	August 21, 2015	Haleakala	Pan-STARRS 1	PHO	540 m	MPC · JPL
866325	2015 RD_{33}	—	September 9, 2015	Haleakala	Pan-STARRS 1	EUN	880 m	MPC · JPL
866326	2015 RG_{34}	—	September 9, 2015	Haleakala	Pan-STARRS 1	PHO	700 m	MPC · JPL
866327	2015 RS_{34}	—	September 9, 2015	Haleakala	Pan-STARRS 1	T_{j} (2.96)	3.8 km	MPC · JPL
866328	2015 RT_{35}	—	January 2, 2012	Mount Lemmon	Mount Lemmon Survey	·	870 m	MPC · JPL
866329	2015 RE_{36}	—	September 10, 2015	Haleakala	Pan-STARRS 1	APO	130 m	MPC · JPL
866330	2015 RN_{39}	—	August 10, 2010	Kitt Peak	Spacewatch	·	1.1 km	MPC · JPL
866331	2015 RY_{39}	—	April 11, 2007	Mount Lemmon	Mount Lemmon Survey	·	440 m	MPC · JPL
866332	2015 RW_{41}	—	July 23, 2015	Haleakala	Pan-STARRS 1	·	460 m	MPC · JPL
866333	2015 RS_{44}	—	September 10, 2015	Haleakala	Pan-STARRS 1	·	480 m	MPC · JPL
866334	2015 RE_{46}	—	September 14, 2005	Kitt Peak	Spacewatch	·	530 m	MPC · JPL
866335	2015 RO_{47}	—	October 2, 2006	Mount Lemmon	Mount Lemmon Survey	HOF	1.9 km	MPC · JPL
866336	2015 RT_{49}	—	March 28, 2014	Mount Lemmon	Mount Lemmon Survey	·	940 m	MPC · JPL
866337	2015 RQ_{51}	—	May 22, 2014	Mount Lemmon	Mount Lemmon Survey	·	1.3 km	MPC · JPL
866338	2015 RW_{51}	—	October 24, 2011	Kitt Peak	Spacewatch	·	1.1 km	MPC · JPL
866339	2015 RK_{52}	—	October 27, 2008	Kitt Peak	Spacewatch	V	510 m	MPC · JPL
866340	2015 RV_{55}	—	August 21, 2008	Pian dei Termini	Osservatorio Astronomico della Montagna Pistoiese	·	430 m	MPC · JPL
866341	2015 RO_{57}	—	August 6, 2005	Palomar	NEAT	·	520 m	MPC · JPL
866342	2015 RU_{57}	—	September 18, 2010	Mount Lemmon	Mount Lemmon Survey	KOR	1.0 km	MPC · JPL
866343	2015 RX_{57}	—	March 6, 2013	Haleakala	Pan-STARRS 1	KOR	990 m	MPC · JPL
866344	2015 RQ_{58}	—	March 6, 2013	Haleakala	Pan-STARRS 1	KOR	1.0 km	MPC · JPL
866345	2015 RF_{60}	—	August 9, 2015	Haleakala	Pan-STARRS 1	·	790 m	MPC · JPL
866346	2015 RA_{61}	—	February 26, 2014	Haleakala	Pan-STARRS 1	·	850 m	MPC · JPL
866347	2015 RM_{61}	—	September 10, 2015	Haleakala	Pan-STARRS 1	H	360 m	MPC · JPL
866348	2015 RK_{62}	—	September 19, 1998	Sacramento Peak	SDSS	(2076)	540 m	MPC · JPL
866349	2015 RM_{65}	—	February 28, 2014	Haleakala	Pan-STARRS 1	H	330 m	MPC · JPL
866350	2015 RO_{68}	—	November 25, 2011	Haleakala	Pan-STARRS 1	·	1.1 km	MPC · JPL
866351	2015 RA_{69}	—	July 23, 2015	Haleakala	Pan-STARRS 1	V	410 m	MPC · JPL
866352	2015 RH_{70}	—	September 25, 2006	Mount Lemmon	Mount Lemmon Survey	·	1.3 km	MPC · JPL
866353	2015 RK_{70}	—	September 10, 2015	Haleakala	Pan-STARRS 1	·	1.6 km	MPC · JPL
866354	2015 RD_{71}	—	February 14, 2013	Haleakala	Pan-STARRS 1	·	1.4 km	MPC · JPL
866355	2015 RJ_{71}	—	September 10, 2015	Haleakala	Pan-STARRS 1	·	510 m	MPC · JPL
866356	2015 RA_{72}	—	June 22, 2015	Haleakala	Pan-STARRS 1	·	2.2 km	MPC · JPL
866357	2015 RC_{77}	—	March 11, 2007	Mount Lemmon	Mount Lemmon Survey	·	650 m	MPC · JPL
866358	2015 RO_{77}	—	September 10, 2015	Haleakala	Pan-STARRS 1	·	1.3 km	MPC · JPL
866359	2015 RK_{78}	—	September 10, 2015	Haleakala	Pan-STARRS 1	·	2.2 km	MPC · JPL
866360	2015 RR_{79}	—	September 10, 2015	Haleakala	Pan-STARRS 1	·	530 m	MPC · JPL
866361	2015 RK_{81}	—	October 17, 2010	Mount Lemmon	Mount Lemmon Survey	·	1.7 km	MPC · JPL
866362	2015 RP_{81}	—	August 12, 2015	Haleakala	Pan-STARRS 1	JUN	770 m	MPC · JPL
866363	2015 RZ_{87}	—	October 26, 2011	Haleakala	Pan-STARRS 1	·	1.2 km	MPC · JPL
866364	2015 RG_{89}	—	October 30, 2010	Kitt Peak	Spacewatch	·	1.5 km	MPC · JPL
866365	2015 RU_{90}	—	September 21, 2011	Kitt Peak	Spacewatch	·	920 m	MPC · JPL
866366	2015 RD_{93}	—	July 25, 2015	Haleakala	Pan-STARRS 1	·	800 m	MPC · JPL
866367	2015 RY_{94}	—	May 17, 2009	Mount Lemmon	Mount Lemmon Survey	·	1.6 km	MPC · JPL
866368	2015 RJ_{97}	—	July 24, 2015	Haleakala	Pan-STARRS 1	·	1.2 km	MPC · JPL
866369	2015 RQ_{101}	—	August 10, 2015	Haleakala	Pan-STARRS 2	·	1.1 km	MPC · JPL
866370	2015 RU_{101}	—	November 24, 2008	Kitt Peak	Spacewatch	·	760 m	MPC · JPL
866371	2015 RR_{103}	—	September 6, 2015	Catalina	CSS	·	690 m	MPC · JPL
866372	2015 RU_{103}	—	September 18, 2006	Kitt Peak	Spacewatch	·	1.4 km	MPC · JPL
866373	2015 RG_{105}	—	October 18, 2011	Mount Lemmon	Mount Lemmon Survey	·	930 m	MPC · JPL
866374	2015 RB_{106}	—	September 7, 2004	Kitt Peak	Spacewatch	MAS	580 m	MPC · JPL
866375	2015 RF_{107}	—	September 11, 2010	Mount Lemmon	Mount Lemmon Survey	·	1.4 km	MPC · JPL
866376	2015 RZ_{115}	—	October 18, 2011	Haleakala	Pan-STARRS 1	·	920 m	MPC · JPL
866377	2015 RK_{116}	—	October 26, 2008	Mount Lemmon	Mount Lemmon Survey	·	710 m	MPC · JPL
866378	2015 RZ_{120}	—	October 25, 2011	Zelenchukskaya	T. V. Krjačko, B. Satovski	·	840 m	MPC · JPL
866379	2015 RG_{124}	—	September 9, 2015	Haleakala	Pan-STARRS 1	KOR	1 km	MPC · JPL
866380	2015 RO_{124}	—	September 9, 2015	Haleakala	Pan-STARRS 1	·	370 m	MPC · JPL
866381	2015 RU_{124}	—	March 5, 2013	Mount Lemmon	Mount Lemmon Survey	KOR	970 m	MPC · JPL
866382	2015 RX_{124}	—	August 21, 2015	Haleakala	Pan-STARRS 1	·	780 m	MPC · JPL
866383	2015 RH_{125}	—	May 9, 2011	Mount Lemmon	Mount Lemmon Survey	·	580 m	MPC · JPL
866384	2015 RU_{126}	—	September 9, 2015	Haleakala	Pan-STARRS 1	·	450 m	MPC · JPL
866385	2015 RN_{130}	—	December 10, 2012	Haleakala	Pan-STARRS 1	·	450 m	MPC · JPL
866386	2015 RR_{131}	—	September 9, 2015	Haleakala	Pan-STARRS 1	·	1.0 km	MPC · JPL
866387	2015 RD_{132}	—	September 9, 2015	Haleakala	Pan-STARRS 1	·	1.2 km	MPC · JPL
866388	2015 RC_{134}	—	October 14, 2012	Kitt Peak	Spacewatch	·	480 m	MPC · JPL
866389	2015 RS_{137}	—	February 14, 2013	Haleakala	Pan-STARRS 1	(12739)	1.2 km	MPC · JPL
866390	2015 RY_{137}	—	May 1, 2003	Kitt Peak	Spacewatch	·	830 m	MPC · JPL
866391	2015 RX_{142}	—	July 28, 2015	Haleakala	Pan-STARRS 1	·	1.8 km	MPC · JPL
866392	2015 RQ_{145}	—	March 2, 2011	Kitt Peak	Spacewatch	·	490 m	MPC · JPL
866393	2015 RA_{146}	—	September 9, 2015	Haleakala	Pan-STARRS 1	·	1.5 km	MPC · JPL
866394	2015 RE_{148}	—	December 13, 2012	Mount Lemmon	Mount Lemmon Survey	·	540 m	MPC · JPL
866395	2015 RJ_{148}	—	June 4, 2011	Mount Lemmon	Mount Lemmon Survey	NYS	610 m	MPC · JPL
866396	2015 RJ_{152}	—	October 22, 2006	Kitt Peak	Spacewatch	·	1.3 km	MPC · JPL
866397	2015 RX_{157}	—	September 9, 2015	Haleakala	Pan-STARRS 1	·	710 m	MPC · JPL
866398	2015 RU_{159}	—	April 5, 2014	Haleakala	Pan-STARRS 1	·	610 m	MPC · JPL
866399	2015 RS_{160}	—	August 21, 2006	Kitt Peak	Spacewatch	·	1.1 km	MPC · JPL
866400	2015 RC_{161}	—	September 9, 2015	Haleakala	Pan-STARRS 1	·	1.2 km	MPC · JPL

== 866401–866500 ==
back to top

Designation			Discovery			Properties		Ref
Permanent	Provisional	Named after	Date	Site	Discoverer(s)	Category	Diam.	Ref
866401	2015 RZ_{161}	—	November 2, 2007	Kitt Peak	Spacewatch	(5)	570 m	MPC · JPL
866402	2015 RM_{165}	—	August 21, 2001	Cerro Tololo	Deep Ecliptic Survey	·	1.2 km	MPC · JPL
866403	2015 RC_{166}	—	September 9, 2015	Haleakala	Pan-STARRS 1	·	880 m	MPC · JPL
866404	2015 RB_{168}	—	September 26, 2011	Mount Lemmon	Mount Lemmon Survey	(5)	690 m	MPC · JPL
866405	2015 RO_{171}	—	October 1, 2010	Kitt Peak	Spacewatch	·	1 km	MPC · JPL
866406	2015 RN_{176}	—	July 23, 2015	Haleakala	Pan-STARRS 1	·	870 m	MPC · JPL
866407	2015 RF_{178}	—	January 10, 2007	Kitt Peak	Spacewatch	·	1.8 km	MPC · JPL
866408	2015 RM_{179}	—	August 28, 2006	Kitt Peak	Spacewatch	·	1.1 km	MPC · JPL
866409	2015 RZ_{186}	—	October 24, 2011	Haleakala	Pan-STARRS 1	·	1.0 km	MPC · JPL
866410	2015 RA_{188}	—	October 10, 2007	Kitt Peak	Spacewatch	(194)	1.0 km	MPC · JPL
866411	2015 RZ_{188}	—	November 15, 2011	Kitt Peak	Spacewatch	·	1.5 km	MPC · JPL
866412	2015 RH_{192}	—	September 29, 2010	Mount Lemmon	Mount Lemmon Survey	KOR	1.0 km	MPC · JPL
866413	2015 RW_{192}	—	August 4, 2011	Haleakala	Pan-STARRS 1	MAS	530 m	MPC · JPL
866414	2015 RK_{196}	—	September 11, 2015	Haleakala	Pan-STARRS 1	·	790 m	MPC · JPL
866415	2015 RL_{196}	—	September 11, 2015	Haleakala	Pan-STARRS 1	·	700 m	MPC · JPL
866416	2015 RY_{199}	—	October 8, 2008	Mount Lemmon	Mount Lemmon Survey	·	720 m	MPC · JPL
866417	2015 RD_{201}	—	September 11, 2015	Haleakala	Pan-STARRS 1	·	470 m	MPC · JPL
866418	2015 RL_{201}	—	September 4, 2007	Mount Lemmon	Mount Lemmon Survey	·	790 m	MPC · JPL
866419	2015 RB_{202}	—	August 12, 2015	Haleakala	Pan-STARRS 1	·	490 m	MPC · JPL
866420	2015 RD_{206}	—	September 6, 2008	Mount Lemmon	Mount Lemmon Survey	·	520 m	MPC · JPL
866421	2015 RP_{207}	—	April 28, 2011	Kitt Peak	Spacewatch	·	520 m	MPC · JPL
866422	2015 RU_{208}	—	September 11, 2015	Haleakala	Pan-STARRS 1	·	1.5 km	MPC · JPL
866423	2015 RV_{211}	—	July 25, 2015	Haleakala	Pan-STARRS 1	·	1.2 km	MPC · JPL
866424	2015 RD_{213}	—	May 8, 2014	Haleakala	Pan-STARRS 1	KOR	1.0 km	MPC · JPL
866425	2015 RC_{217}	—	September 11, 2015	Haleakala	Pan-STARRS 1	·	2.5 km	MPC · JPL
866426	2015 RL_{218}	—	September 11, 2015	Haleakala	Pan-STARRS 1	·	1.1 km	MPC · JPL
866427	2015 RG_{219}	—	October 17, 2010	Mount Lemmon	Mount Lemmon Survey	·	1.7 km	MPC · JPL
866428	2015 RY_{221}	—	September 11, 2015	Haleakala	Pan-STARRS 1	·	430 m	MPC · JPL
866429	2015 RR_{224}	—	September 11, 2015	Haleakala	Pan-STARRS 1	·	1.5 km	MPC · JPL
866430	2015 RF_{226}	—	December 29, 2011	Mount Lemmon	Mount Lemmon Survey	·	1.3 km	MPC · JPL
866431	2015 RW_{226}	—	August 12, 2015	Haleakala	Pan-STARRS 1	·	1.3 km	MPC · JPL
866432	2015 RB_{228}	—	September 21, 2011	Mount Lemmon	Mount Lemmon Survey	NYS	930 m	MPC · JPL
866433	2015 RL_{229}	—	March 19, 2013	Haleakala	Pan-STARRS 1	·	1.5 km	MPC · JPL
866434	2015 RT_{230}	—	September 11, 2015	Haleakala	Pan-STARRS 1	·	960 m	MPC · JPL
866435	2015 RB_{231}	—	February 27, 2012	Haleakala	Pan-STARRS 1	·	2.4 km	MPC · JPL
866436	2015 RA_{232}	—	September 11, 2015	Haleakala	Pan-STARRS 1	·	1.9 km	MPC · JPL
866437	2015 RU_{232}	—	November 5, 2010	Kitt Peak	Spacewatch	·	1.7 km	MPC · JPL
866438	2015 RK_{233}	—	August 31, 2005	Kitt Peak	Spacewatch	·	490 m	MPC · JPL
866439	2015 RN_{233}	—	September 11, 2015	Haleakala	Pan-STARRS 1	·	800 m	MPC · JPL
866440	2015 RD_{235}	—	September 11, 2015	Haleakala	Pan-STARRS 1	·	1.4 km	MPC · JPL
866441	2015 RQ_{235}	—	April 5, 2014	Haleakala	Pan-STARRS 1	·	940 m	MPC · JPL
866442	2015 RT_{236}	—	January 2, 2011	Mount Lemmon	Mount Lemmon Survey	·	2.1 km	MPC · JPL
866443	2015 RC_{237}	—	September 11, 2015	Haleakala	Pan-STARRS 1	·	1.7 km	MPC · JPL
866444	2015 RT_{238}	—	September 11, 2015	Haleakala	Pan-STARRS 1	·	1.3 km	MPC · JPL
866445	2015 RE_{239}	—	February 25, 2007	Mount Lemmon	Mount Lemmon Survey	·	1.5 km	MPC · JPL
866446	2015 RL_{239}	—	November 23, 2002	Palomar	NEAT	JUN	780 m	MPC · JPL
866447	2015 RS_{240}	—	September 20, 2004	Siding Spring	SSS	·	1.9 km	MPC · JPL
866448	2015 RA_{242}	—	September 11, 2015	Haleakala	Pan-STARRS 1	·	1.1 km	MPC · JPL
866449	2015 RZ_{242}	—	September 19, 2011	Haleakala	Pan-STARRS 1	·	1.0 km	MPC · JPL
866450	2015 RF_{243}	—	July 28, 2015	Haleakala	Pan-STARRS 1	LIX	2.3 km	MPC · JPL
866451	2015 RF_{246}	—	March 6, 2014	Kitt Peak	Spacewatch	H	310 m	MPC · JPL
866452	2015 RP_{246}	—	September 9, 2015	Haleakala	Pan-STARRS 1	H	260 m	MPC · JPL
866453	2015 RY_{246}	—	September 9, 2015	Haleakala	Pan-STARRS 1	H	510 m	MPC · JPL
866454	2015 RO_{247}	—	September 12, 2015	Haleakala	Pan-STARRS 1	H	420 m	MPC · JPL
866455	2015 RW_{248}	—	September 9, 2015	Haleakala	Pan-STARRS 1	·	830 m	MPC · JPL
866456	2015 RD_{249}	—	September 9, 2015	Haleakala	Pan-STARRS 1	·	1.3 km	MPC · JPL
866457	2015 RD_{250}	—	September 10, 2015	Haleakala	Pan-STARRS 1	·	2.2 km	MPC · JPL
866458	2015 RQ_{253}	—	September 18, 2010	Mount Lemmon	Mount Lemmon Survey	·	1.0 km	MPC · JPL
866459	2015 RQ_{255}	—	September 12, 2015	Haleakala	Pan-STARRS 1	AGN	840 m	MPC · JPL
866460	2015 RJ_{256}	—	May 28, 2014	Haleakala	Pan-STARRS 1	·	910 m	MPC · JPL
866461	2015 RW_{258}	—	September 9, 2015	Haleakala	Pan-STARRS 1	·	1.8 km	MPC · JPL
866462	2015 RG_{259}	—	September 10, 2015	Haleakala	Pan-STARRS 1	·	1.6 km	MPC · JPL
866463	2015 RP_{259}	—	September 11, 2015	Haleakala	Pan-STARRS 1	·	1.2 km	MPC · JPL
866464	2015 RE_{260}	—	September 9, 2015	Haleakala	Pan-STARRS 1	·	1.1 km	MPC · JPL
866465	2015 RB_{262}	—	May 8, 2014	Haleakala	Pan-STARRS 1	·	1.1 km	MPC · JPL
866466	2015 RW_{262}	—	October 31, 2010	Mount Lemmon	Mount Lemmon Survey	·	1.9 km	MPC · JPL
866467	2015 RH_{264}	—	September 9, 2015	Haleakala	Pan-STARRS 1	·	1.3 km	MPC · JPL
866468	2015 RK_{264}	—	March 19, 2013	Haleakala	Pan-STARRS 1	·	1.3 km	MPC · JPL
866469	2015 RN_{265}	—	May 8, 2014	Haleakala	Pan-STARRS 1	·	1.0 km	MPC · JPL
866470	2015 RR_{265}	—	October 26, 2011	Haleakala	Pan-STARRS 1	·	1.0 km	MPC · JPL
866471	2015 RB_{266}	—	September 9, 2015	Haleakala	Pan-STARRS 1	·	1.4 km	MPC · JPL
866472	2015 RG_{271}	—	September 11, 2015	Haleakala	Pan-STARRS 1	·	1.5 km	MPC · JPL
866473	2015 RD_{272}	—	January 10, 2013	Haleakala	Pan-STARRS 1	·	1.1 km	MPC · JPL
866474	2015 RX_{272}	—	September 11, 2015	Haleakala	Pan-STARRS 1	·	2.0 km	MPC · JPL
866475	2015 RE_{273}	—	September 11, 2015	Haleakala	Pan-STARRS 1	·	2.5 km	MPC · JPL
866476	2015 RJ_{273}	—	September 11, 2015	Haleakala	Pan-STARRS 1	·	1.2 km	MPC · JPL
866477	2015 RV_{273}	—	August 13, 2010	Kitt Peak	Spacewatch	AGN	910 m	MPC · JPL
866478	2015 RL_{274}	—	September 16, 2006	Kitt Peak	Spacewatch	·	1.1 km	MPC · JPL
866479	2015 RR_{274}	—	September 12, 2015	Haleakala	Pan-STARRS 1	·	2.1 km	MPC · JPL
866480	2015 RE_{276}	—	September 12, 2015	Haleakala	Pan-STARRS 1	·	940 m	MPC · JPL
866481	2015 RH_{276}	—	September 12, 2015	Haleakala	Pan-STARRS 1	·	2.0 km	MPC · JPL
866482	2015 RX_{276}	—	July 2, 2014	Haleakala	Pan-STARRS 1	·	1.4 km	MPC · JPL
866483	2015 RB_{282}	—	April 1, 2012	Mount Lemmon	Mount Lemmon Survey	·	2.1 km	MPC · JPL
866484	2015 RM_{282}	—	September 9, 2015	Haleakala	Pan-STARRS 1	·	1.5 km	MPC · JPL
866485	2015 RV_{282}	—	September 9, 2015	Haleakala	Pan-STARRS 1	·	800 m	MPC · JPL
866486	2015 RW_{283}	—	September 6, 2015	Haleakala	Pan-STARRS 1	·	1.0 km	MPC · JPL
866487	2015 RT_{284}	—	September 12, 2015	Haleakala	Pan-STARRS 1	·	770 m	MPC · JPL
866488	2015 RO_{285}	—	September 9, 2015	Haleakala	Pan-STARRS 1	·	1.9 km	MPC · JPL
866489	2015 RM_{287}	—	January 20, 2009	Kitt Peak	Spacewatch	·	740 m	MPC · JPL
866490	2015 RQ_{288}	—	September 12, 2015	Haleakala	Pan-STARRS 1	·	570 m	MPC · JPL
866491	2015 RQ_{290}	—	September 9, 2015	Haleakala	Pan-STARRS 1	·	700 m	MPC · JPL
866492	2015 RC_{292}	—	September 9, 2015	Haleakala	Pan-STARRS 1	·	460 m	MPC · JPL
866493	2015 RG_{293}	—	September 11, 2015	Haleakala	Pan-STARRS 1	·	1.3 km	MPC · JPL
866494	2015 RW_{294}	—	September 11, 2015	Haleakala	Pan-STARRS 1	·	950 m	MPC · JPL
866495	2015 RV_{295}	—	September 11, 2015	Haleakala	Pan-STARRS 1	EOS	1.2 km	MPC · JPL
866496	2015 RH_{298}	—	September 12, 2015	Haleakala	Pan-STARRS 1	MAR	640 m	MPC · JPL
866497	2015 RO_{298}	—	September 12, 2015	Haleakala	Pan-STARRS 1	·	1.1 km	MPC · JPL
866498	2015 RU_{298}	—	September 11, 2015	Haleakala	Pan-STARRS 1	·	470 m	MPC · JPL
866499	2015 RO_{300}	—	September 11, 2015	Haleakala	Pan-STARRS 1	·	1.4 km	MPC · JPL
866500	2015 RP_{300}	—	September 10, 2015	Haleakala	Pan-STARRS 1	(2076)	420 m	MPC · JPL

== 866501–866600 ==
back to top

Designation			Discovery			Properties		Ref
Permanent	Provisional	Named after	Date	Site	Discoverer(s)	Category	Diam.	Ref
866501	2015 RY_{300}	—	September 9, 2015	Haleakala	Pan-STARRS 1	LIX	2.7 km	MPC · JPL
866502	2015 RD_{302}	—	September 9, 2015	Haleakala	Pan-STARRS 1	·	1.4 km	MPC · JPL
866503	2015 RM_{302}	—	September 12, 2015	Haleakala	Pan-STARRS 1	HNS	760 m	MPC · JPL
866504	2015 RW_{302}	—	September 11, 2015	Haleakala	Pan-STARRS 1	·	420 m	MPC · JPL
866505	2015 RA_{305}	—	September 11, 2015	Haleakala	Pan-STARRS 1	V	430 m	MPC · JPL
866506	2015 RN_{305}	—	September 9, 2015	Haleakala	Pan-STARRS 1	·	900 m	MPC · JPL
866507	2015 RT_{308}	—	September 12, 2015	Haleakala	Pan-STARRS 1	ARM	2.1 km	MPC · JPL
866508	2015 RU_{309}	—	September 9, 2015	Haleakala	Pan-STARRS 1	THM	1.6 km	MPC · JPL
866509	2015 RJ_{310}	—	September 9, 2015	Haleakala	Pan-STARRS 1	·	2.1 km	MPC · JPL
866510	2015 RA_{311}	—	September 9, 2015	Haleakala	Pan-STARRS 1	·	810 m	MPC · JPL
866511	2015 RC_{311}	—	September 12, 2015	Haleakala	Pan-STARRS 1	NEM	1.6 km	MPC · JPL
866512	2015 RS_{311}	—	September 10, 2015	Haleakala	Pan-STARRS 1	EOS	1.3 km	MPC · JPL
866513	2015 RW_{311}	—	September 11, 2015	Haleakala	Pan-STARRS 1	·	450 m	MPC · JPL
866514	2015 RK_{315}	—	September 6, 2015	Haleakala	Pan-STARRS 1	KOR	1.0 km	MPC · JPL
866515	2015 RL_{315}	—	September 9, 2015	Haleakala	Pan-STARRS 1	KOR	920 m	MPC · JPL
866516	2015 RT_{315}	—	September 12, 2015	Haleakala	Pan-STARRS 1	·	980 m	MPC · JPL
866517	2015 RB_{316}	—	September 12, 2015	Haleakala	Pan-STARRS 1	·	1.1 km	MPC · JPL
866518	2015 RE_{316}	—	September 12, 2015	Haleakala	Pan-STARRS 1	EOS	1.4 km	MPC · JPL
866519	2015 RL_{317}	—	September 9, 2015	Haleakala	Pan-STARRS 1	·	550 m	MPC · JPL
866520	2015 RO_{317}	—	September 9, 2015	Haleakala	Pan-STARRS 1	·	1.5 km	MPC · JPL
866521	2015 RQ_{317}	—	September 11, 2015	Haleakala	Pan-STARRS 1	·	1.3 km	MPC · JPL
866522	2015 RC_{318}	—	September 12, 2015	Haleakala	Pan-STARRS 1	·	1.1 km	MPC · JPL
866523	2015 RW_{318}	—	September 9, 2015	Haleakala	Pan-STARRS 1	·	1.2 km	MPC · JPL
866524	2015 RN_{319}	—	September 12, 2015	Haleakala	Pan-STARRS 1	·	1.3 km	MPC · JPL
866525	2015 RQ_{319}	—	September 9, 2015	Haleakala	Pan-STARRS 1	·	1.7 km	MPC · JPL
866526	2015 RL_{320}	—	September 9, 2015	Haleakala	Pan-STARRS 1	KOR	960 m	MPC · JPL
866527	2015 RP_{320}	—	September 10, 2015	Haleakala	Pan-STARRS 1	EOS	1.3 km	MPC · JPL
866528	2015 RA_{321}	—	September 9, 2015	Haleakala	Pan-STARRS 1	·	580 m	MPC · JPL
866529	2015 RB_{321}	—	September 9, 2015	Haleakala	Pan-STARRS 1	·	1.2 km	MPC · JPL
866530	2015 RM_{322}	—	September 9, 2015	Haleakala	Pan-STARRS 1	·	1.6 km	MPC · JPL
866531	2015 RV_{323}	—	September 12, 2015	Haleakala	Pan-STARRS 1	EOS	1.1 km	MPC · JPL
866532	2015 RO_{324}	—	September 9, 2015	Haleakala	Pan-STARRS 1	·	1.7 km	MPC · JPL
866533	2015 RP_{324}	—	September 9, 2015	Haleakala	Pan-STARRS 1	·	1.3 km	MPC · JPL
866534	2015 RW_{326}	—	September 9, 2015	Haleakala	Pan-STARRS 1	·	1.8 km	MPC · JPL
866535	2015 RX_{327}	—	September 6, 2015	Kitt Peak	Spacewatch	·	450 m	MPC · JPL
866536	2015 RD_{328}	—	September 11, 2015	Haleakala	Pan-STARRS 1	·	1.2 km	MPC · JPL
866537	2015 RT_{328}	—	September 12, 2015	Haleakala	Pan-STARRS 1	·	410 m	MPC · JPL
866538	2015 RX_{328}	—	September 12, 2015	Haleakala	Pan-STARRS 1	·	560 m	MPC · JPL
866539	2015 RH_{330}	—	September 6, 2015	Kitt Peak	Spacewatch	AGN	860 m	MPC · JPL
866540	2015 RQ_{330}	—	October 23, 2006	Kitt Peak	Spacewatch	·	1.2 km	MPC · JPL
866541	2015 RS_{331}	—	September 9, 2015	Haleakala	Pan-STARRS 1	·	470 m	MPC · JPL
866542	2015 RJ_{333}	—	September 6, 2015	Haleakala	Pan-STARRS 1	HNS	780 m	MPC · JPL
866543	2015 RJ_{334}	—	September 9, 2015	Haleakala	Pan-STARRS 1	·	900 m	MPC · JPL
866544	2015 RS_{334}	—	September 12, 2015	Haleakala	Pan-STARRS 1	·	490 m	MPC · JPL
866545	2015 RA_{335}	—	September 9, 2015	Haleakala	Pan-STARRS 1	·	460 m	MPC · JPL
866546	2015 RE_{335}	—	September 8, 2015	Haleakala	Pan-STARRS 1	·	450 m	MPC · JPL
866547	2015 RY_{335}	—	September 12, 2015	Haleakala	Pan-STARRS 1	·	780 m	MPC · JPL
866548	2015 RH_{338}	—	September 25, 2008	Mount Lemmon	Mount Lemmon Survey	·	500 m	MPC · JPL
866549	2015 RJ_{338}	—	September 12, 2015	Haleakala	Pan-STARRS 1	·	400 m	MPC · JPL
866550	2015 RT_{338}	—	September 11, 2015	Haleakala	Pan-STARRS 1	·	1.3 km	MPC · JPL
866551	2015 RQ_{339}	—	July 25, 2015	Haleakala	Pan-STARRS 1	·	720 m	MPC · JPL
866552	2015 RV_{340}	—	September 2, 2010	Mount Lemmon	Mount Lemmon Survey	HOF	2.0 km	MPC · JPL
866553	2015 RP_{341}	—	September 6, 2015	Kitt Peak	Spacewatch	3:2	3.4 km	MPC · JPL
866554	2015 RR_{342}	—	September 11, 2015	Haleakala	Pan-STARRS 1	DOR	1.7 km	MPC · JPL
866555	2015 RF_{346}	—	September 9, 2015	Haleakala	Pan-STARRS 1	·	2.4 km	MPC · JPL
866556	2015 RL_{346}	—	September 12, 2015	Haleakala	Pan-STARRS 1	·	1.4 km	MPC · JPL
866557	2015 RD_{347}	—	September 12, 2015	Haleakala	Pan-STARRS 1	·	530 m	MPC · JPL
866558	2015 RQ_{347}	—	September 10, 2015	Haleakala	Pan-STARRS 1	T_{j} (2.98)	2.4 km	MPC · JPL
866559	2015 RC_{350}	—	September 12, 2015	Haleakala	Pan-STARRS 1	·	1.9 km	MPC · JPL
866560	2015 RP_{352}	—	September 8, 2015	Haleakala	Pan-STARRS 1	·	990 m	MPC · JPL
866561	2015 RS_{352}	—	September 8, 2015	Haleakala	Pan-STARRS 1	·	490 m	MPC · JPL
866562	2015 RX_{353}	—	September 11, 2015	Haleakala	Pan-STARRS 1	·	1.8 km	MPC · JPL
866563	2015 RG_{356}	—	January 9, 2013	Kitt Peak	Spacewatch	·	1.4 km	MPC · JPL
866564	2015 RV_{356}	—	September 11, 2015	Haleakala	Pan-STARRS 1	H	420 m	MPC · JPL
866565	2015 RT_{357}	—	September 12, 2015	Haleakala	Pan-STARRS 1	EOS	1.4 km	MPC · JPL
866566	2015 RY_{357}	—	September 9, 2015	Haleakala	Pan-STARRS 1	HNS	830 m	MPC · JPL
866567	2015 RZ_{358}	—	September 12, 2015	Haleakala	Pan-STARRS 1	·	400 m	MPC · JPL
866568	2015 RO_{359}	—	September 12, 2015	Haleakala	Pan-STARRS 1	·	1.4 km	MPC · JPL
866569	2015 RG_{360}	—	May 3, 2014	Mount Lemmon	Mount Lemmon Survey	AEO	720 m	MPC · JPL
866570	2015 RH_{360}	—	September 21, 2008	Mount Lemmon	Mount Lemmon Survey	·	410 m	MPC · JPL
866571	2015 RY_{361}	—	September 11, 2015	Haleakala	Pan-STARRS 1	·	430 m	MPC · JPL
866572	2015 RX_{367}	—	September 12, 2015	Haleakala	Pan-STARRS 1	·	980 m	MPC · JPL
866573	2015 RV_{371}	—	September 6, 2015	Haleakala	Pan-STARRS 1	·	450 m	MPC · JPL
866574	2015 RQ_{372}	—	September 6, 2015	Kitt Peak	Spacewatch	·	460 m	MPC · JPL
866575	2015 RQ_{373}	—	September 9, 2015	Haleakala	Pan-STARRS 1	·	570 m	MPC · JPL
866576	2015 RD_{376}	—	July 19, 2015	Haleakala	Pan-STARRS 1	·	640 m	MPC · JPL
866577	2015 RZ_{376}	—	September 6, 2015	Kitt Peak	Spacewatch	·	1.5 km	MPC · JPL
866578	2015 RE_{381}	—	September 9, 2015	Haleakala	Pan-STARRS 1	·	1.3 km	MPC · JPL
866579	2015 RG_{384}	—	September 9, 2015	Haleakala	Pan-STARRS 1	·	1.8 km	MPC · JPL
866580	2015 SY_{2}	—	September 19, 2015	Haleakala	Pan-STARRS 1	AMO	460 m	MPC · JPL
866581	2015 SC_{6}	—	July 26, 2015	Haleakala	Pan-STARRS 2	·	960 m	MPC · JPL
866582	2015 SA_{10}	—	May 20, 2014	Haleakala	Pan-STARRS 1	·	910 m	MPC · JPL
866583	2015 SF_{11}	—	September 10, 2015	Haleakala	Pan-STARRS 1	3:2	3.6 km	MPC · JPL
866584	2015 SR_{11}	—	September 10, 2015	Haleakala	Pan-STARRS 1	·	1.5 km	MPC · JPL
866585	2015 SN_{13}	—	October 29, 2005	Kitt Peak	Spacewatch	·	400 m	MPC · JPL
866586	2015 SA_{14}	—	July 23, 2015	Haleakala	Pan-STARRS 1	·	2.2 km	MPC · JPL
866587	2015 SD_{15}	—	January 1, 2008	Kitt Peak	Spacewatch	·	990 m	MPC · JPL
866588	2015 SV_{17}	—	October 23, 2011	Front Royal	Skillman, D.	·	1.1 km	MPC · JPL
866589	2015 SD_{19}	—	September 7, 2015	XuYi	PMO NEO Survey Program	·	2.7 km	MPC · JPL
866590	2015 SG_{22}	—	May 27, 2014	Mount Lemmon	Mount Lemmon Survey	H	500 m	MPC · JPL
866591	2015 SK_{22}	—	September 23, 2015	Haleakala	Pan-STARRS 1	H	360 m	MPC · JPL
866592	2015 SC_{23}	—	October 5, 2004	Anderson Mesa	LONEOS	·	2.3 km	MPC · JPL
866593	2015 SF_{25}	—	September 26, 2009	Mount Lemmon	Mount Lemmon Survey	·	2.0 km	MPC · JPL
866594	2015 SY_{25}	—	December 12, 2006	Kitt Peak	Spacewatch	(16286)	1.4 km	MPC · JPL
866595	2015 SG_{26}	—	June 29, 2014	Haleakala	Pan-STARRS 1	EOS	1.3 km	MPC · JPL
866596	2015 SV_{26}	—	March 19, 2013	Haleakala	Pan-STARRS 1	·	2.1 km	MPC · JPL
866597	2015 SP_{28}	—	September 23, 2015	Haleakala	Pan-STARRS 1	EOS	1.3 km	MPC · JPL
866598	2015 SA_{29}	—	September 23, 2015	Haleakala	Pan-STARRS 1	EOS	1.4 km	MPC · JPL
866599	2015 SK_{29}	—	September 23, 2015	Haleakala	Pan-STARRS 1	·	1.2 km	MPC · JPL
866600	2015 SU_{29}	—	June 24, 2014	Haleakala	Pan-STARRS 1	·	1.7 km	MPC · JPL

== 866601–866700 ==
back to top

Designation			Discovery			Properties		Ref
Permanent	Provisional	Named after	Date	Site	Discoverer(s)	Category	Diam.	Ref
866601	2015 SG_{30}	—	July 1, 2014	Haleakala	Pan-STARRS 1	·	2.3 km	MPC · JPL
866602	2015 SS_{30}	—	September 25, 2015	Haleakala	Pan-STARRS 1	·	1.5 km	MPC · JPL
866603	2015 SH_{31}	—	September 23, 2015	Haleakala	Pan-STARRS 1	H	360 m	MPC · JPL
866604	2015 SK_{31}	—	September 23, 2015	Haleakala	Pan-STARRS 1	TIR	1.8 km	MPC · JPL
866605	2015 SZ_{31}	—	September 19, 2015	Haleakala	Pan-STARRS 1	THB	2.2 km	MPC · JPL
866606	2015 SF_{32}	—	September 23, 2015	Haleakala	Pan-STARRS 1	·	500 m	MPC · JPL
866607	2015 SP_{32}	—	September 23, 2015	Haleakala	Pan-STARRS 1	·	440 m	MPC · JPL
866608	2015 SV_{32}	—	September 23, 2015	Haleakala	Pan-STARRS 1	·	490 m	MPC · JPL
866609	2015 SN_{33}	—	September 23, 2015	Haleakala	Pan-STARRS 1	·	740 m	MPC · JPL
866610	2015 ST_{33}	—	September 23, 2015	Haleakala	Pan-STARRS 1	·	1.0 km	MPC · JPL
866611	2015 SZ_{34}	—	September 23, 2015	Haleakala	Pan-STARRS 1	·	490 m	MPC · JPL
866612	2015 SA_{36}	—	September 23, 2015	Haleakala	Pan-STARRS 1	·	1.0 km	MPC · JPL
866613	2015 SH_{37}	—	September 24, 2015	Mount Lemmon	Mount Lemmon Survey	EUN	1.0 km	MPC · JPL
866614	2015 SO_{37}	—	September 23, 2015	Haleakala	Pan-STARRS 1	·	670 m	MPC · JPL
866615	2015 SE_{38}	—	September 23, 2015	Haleakala	Pan-STARRS 1	·	560 m	MPC · JPL
866616	2015 SL_{38}	—	September 23, 2015	Haleakala	Pan-STARRS 1	·	480 m	MPC · JPL
866617	2015 SQ_{38}	—	September 23, 2015	Haleakala	Pan-STARRS 1	·	570 m	MPC · JPL
866618	2015 SU_{39}	—	September 18, 2015	Kitt Peak	Spacewatch	·	1.6 km	MPC · JPL
866619	2015 SQ_{40}	—	September 23, 2015	Haleakala	Pan-STARRS 1	·	2.0 km	MPC · JPL
866620	2015 SU_{41}	—	September 23, 2015	Haleakala	Pan-STARRS 1	EOS	1.4 km	MPC · JPL
866621	2015 SA_{42}	—	September 20, 2015	Mount Lemmon	Mount Lemmon Survey	·	1.1 km	MPC · JPL
866622	2015 SP_{42}	—	September 23, 2015	Westfield	International Astronomical Search Collaboration	·	1.8 km	MPC · JPL
866623	2015 SX_{43}	—	September 23, 2015	Haleakala	Pan-STARRS 1	·	1.4 km	MPC · JPL
866624	2015 SA_{44}	—	September 23, 2015	Haleakala	Pan-STARRS 1	EOS	1.2 km	MPC · JPL
866625	2015 SP_{44}	—	September 23, 2015	Haleakala	Pan-STARRS 1	·	550 m	MPC · JPL
866626	2015 SQ_{44}	—	September 23, 2015	Haleakala	Pan-STARRS 1	·	1.1 km	MPC · JPL
866627	2015 SO_{45}	—	September 24, 2015	Westfield	International Astronomical Search Collaboration	·	1.3 km	MPC · JPL
866628	2015 SV_{47}	—	September 20, 2015	Catalina	CSS	·	550 m	MPC · JPL
866629	2015 SY_{48}	—	September 23, 2015	Haleakala	Pan-STARRS 1	·	1.1 km	MPC · JPL
866630	2015 SA_{50}	—	September 23, 2015	Mount Lemmon	Mount Lemmon Survey	EOS	1.5 km	MPC · JPL
866631	2015 SO_{51}	—	September 23, 2015	Haleakala	Pan-STARRS 1	V	440 m	MPC · JPL
866632	2015 SV_{51}	—	September 23, 2015	Haleakala	Pan-STARRS 1	·	1.4 km	MPC · JPL
866633	2015 SC_{52}	—	September 24, 2015	Mount Lemmon	Mount Lemmon Survey	T_{j} (2.96)	2.7 km	MPC · JPL
866634	2015 SL_{54}	—	September 23, 2015	Haleakala	Pan-STARRS 1	·	870 m	MPC · JPL
866635	2015 SV_{54}	—	September 23, 2015	Haleakala	Pan-STARRS 1	·	810 m	MPC · JPL
866636	2015 SX_{54}	—	September 24, 2008	Kitt Peak	Spacewatch	PHO	820 m	MPC · JPL
866637	2015 ST_{55}	—	September 23, 2015	Haleakala	Pan-STARRS 1	(1338) (FLO)	450 m	MPC · JPL
866638	2015 SU_{55}	—	September 25, 2015	Mount Lemmon	Mount Lemmon Survey	·	500 m	MPC · JPL
866639	2015 SJ_{56}	—	September 18, 2015	Kitt Peak	Spacewatch	KOR	1.2 km	MPC · JPL
866640	2015 TH_{3}	—	October 1, 2015	Mount Lemmon	Mount Lemmon Survey	·	490 m	MPC · JPL
866641	2015 TP_{3}	—	October 1, 2015	Mount Lemmon	Mount Lemmon Survey	·	550 m	MPC · JPL
866642	2015 TS_{4}	—	August 19, 2006	Kitt Peak	Spacewatch	·	1.1 km	MPC · JPL
866643	2015 TQ_{5}	—	August 30, 2006	Anderson Mesa	LONEOS	·	2.1 km	MPC · JPL
866644	2015 TP_{6}	—	August 8, 2004	Needville	J. Dellinger	·	770 m	MPC · JPL
866645	2015 TL_{7}	—	July 23, 2015	Haleakala	Pan-STARRS 1	·	740 m	MPC · JPL
866646	2015 TN_{9}	—	July 28, 2015	Haleakala	Pan-STARRS 1	·	870 m	MPC · JPL
866647	2015 TQ_{9}	—	December 30, 2005	Kitt Peak	Spacewatch	·	2.1 km	MPC · JPL
866648	2015 TJ_{11}	—	July 28, 2015	Haleakala	Pan-STARRS 1	·	1.5 km	MPC · JPL
866649	2015 TN_{11}	—	July 19, 2015	Haleakala	Pan-STARRS 1	·	1.0 km	MPC · JPL
866650	2015 TG_{12}	—	September 7, 2004	Kitt Peak	Spacewatch	·	2.2 km	MPC · JPL
866651	2015 TO_{14}	—	July 25, 2015	Haleakala	Pan-STARRS 1	·	450 m	MPC · JPL
866652	2015 TO_{15}	—	April 29, 2014	Haleakala	Pan-STARRS 1	·	1.5 km	MPC · JPL
866653	2015 TR_{16}	—	September 11, 2010	Mount Lemmon	Mount Lemmon Survey	·	2.5 km	MPC · JPL
866654	2015 TT_{17}	—	May 23, 2014	Haleakala	Pan-STARRS 1	·	1.7 km	MPC · JPL
866655	2015 TL_{19}	—	September 19, 2010	Kitt Peak	Spacewatch	·	1.7 km	MPC · JPL
866656	2015 TM_{19}	—	December 5, 2007	Kitt Peak	Spacewatch	(5)	720 m	MPC · JPL
866657	2015 TJ_{23}	—	October 30, 2010	Mount Lemmon	Mount Lemmon Survey	·	2.1 km	MPC · JPL
866658	2015 TE_{27}	—	July 29, 2005	Palomar	NEAT	·	540 m	MPC · JPL
866659	2015 TM_{28}	—	April 30, 2014	Haleakala	Pan-STARRS 1	·	1.5 km	MPC · JPL
866660	2015 TE_{31}	—	August 14, 2015	Haleakala	Pan-STARRS 1	·	1.6 km	MPC · JPL
866661	2015 TU_{32}	—	August 21, 2015	Haleakala	Pan-STARRS 1	·	1.5 km	MPC · JPL
866662	2015 TW_{32}	—	April 6, 2011	Mount Lemmon	Mount Lemmon Survey	·	590 m	MPC · JPL
866663	2015 TN_{33}	—	February 26, 2014	Haleakala	Pan-STARRS 1	V	500 m	MPC · JPL
866664	2015 TA_{34}	—	January 19, 2012	Haleakala	Pan-STARRS 1	LUT	2.7 km	MPC · JPL
866665	2015 TO_{36}	—	October 2, 2006	Catalina	CSS	·	1.7 km	MPC · JPL
866666	2015 TQ_{36}	—	October 23, 2011	Haleakala	Pan-STARRS 1	·	1.1 km	MPC · JPL
866667	2015 TV_{41}	—	May 2, 2014	Mount Lemmon	Mount Lemmon Survey	·	1.1 km	MPC · JPL
866668	2015 TB_{43}	—	November 8, 2010	Mount Lemmon	Mount Lemmon Survey	·	2.2 km	MPC · JPL
866669	2015 TM_{46}	—	October 7, 2005	Kitt Peak	Spacewatch	·	370 m	MPC · JPL
866670	2015 TT_{47}	—	February 14, 2013	Haleakala	Pan-STARRS 1	·	1.2 km	MPC · JPL
866671	2015 TA_{48}	—	August 9, 2015	Haleakala	Pan-STARRS 1	·	1.2 km	MPC · JPL
866672	2015 TO_{50}	—	July 25, 2015	Haleakala	Pan-STARRS 1	·	1.8 km	MPC · JPL
866673	2015 TJ_{51}	—	February 22, 2014	Kitt Peak	Spacewatch	·	890 m	MPC · JPL
866674	2015 TG_{52}	—	October 8, 2015	Haleakala	Pan-STARRS 1	·	1.8 km	MPC · JPL
866675	2015 TR_{53}	—	July 23, 2015	Haleakala	Pan-STARRS 1	·	1.0 km	MPC · JPL
866676	2015 TR_{54}	—	February 28, 2014	Haleakala	Pan-STARRS 1	V	390 m	MPC · JPL
866677	2015 TM_{56}	—	October 24, 2011	Haleakala	Pan-STARRS 1	·	960 m	MPC · JPL
866678	2015 TZ_{57}	—	December 4, 2012	Mount Lemmon	Mount Lemmon Survey	·	470 m	MPC · JPL
866679	2015 TF_{59}	—	October 31, 2010	Mount Lemmon	Mount Lemmon Survey	·	1.5 km	MPC · JPL
866680	2015 TK_{59}	—	July 25, 2015	Haleakala	Pan-STARRS 1	·	1.6 km	MPC · JPL
866681	2015 TO_{59}	—	July 25, 2015	Haleakala	Pan-STARRS 1	AGN	920 m	MPC · JPL
866682	2015 TP_{59}	—	July 27, 2011	Haleakala	Pan-STARRS 1	·	730 m	MPC · JPL
866683	2015 TE_{60}	—	July 23, 2015	Haleakala	Pan-STARRS 1	·	1.7 km	MPC · JPL
866684	2015 TR_{62}	—	October 8, 2015	Haleakala	Pan-STARRS 1	·	1.2 km	MPC · JPL
866685	2015 TJ_{63}	—	October 31, 2005	Kitt Peak	Spacewatch	·	370 m	MPC · JPL
866686	2015 TS_{63}	—	March 24, 2009	Kitt Peak	Spacewatch	H	390 m	MPC · JPL
866687	2015 TF_{64}	—	October 8, 2015	Haleakala	Pan-STARRS 1	(883)	520 m	MPC · JPL
866688	2015 TW_{64}	—	May 21, 2014	Haleakala	Pan-STARRS 1	·	770 m	MPC · JPL
866689	2015 TA_{65}	—	October 8, 2015	Haleakala	Pan-STARRS 1	·	570 m	MPC · JPL
866690	2015 TE_{67}	—	October 8, 2015	Haleakala	Pan-STARRS 1	·	1.4 km	MPC · JPL
866691	2015 TY_{68}	—	October 29, 2010	Kitt Peak	Spacewatch	·	1.4 km	MPC · JPL
866692	2015 TC_{70}	—	September 23, 2008	Kitt Peak	Spacewatch	·	490 m	MPC · JPL
866693	2015 TR_{70}	—	October 28, 1994	Kitt Peak	Spacewatch	·	790 m	MPC · JPL
866694	2015 TG_{71}	—	September 9, 2015	Haleakala	Pan-STARRS 1	·	960 m	MPC · JPL
866695	2015 TT_{71}	—	December 3, 2004	Kitt Peak	Spacewatch	·	800 m	MPC · JPL
866696	2015 TC_{72}	—	October 8, 2015	Haleakala	Pan-STARRS 1	·	490 m	MPC · JPL
866697	2015 TO_{76}	—	October 8, 2015	Haleakala	Pan-STARRS 1	·	1.5 km	MPC · JPL
866698	2015 TP_{76}	—	October 26, 2011	Haleakala	Pan-STARRS 1	RAF	560 m	MPC · JPL
866699	2015 TE_{80}	—	September 9, 2015	Haleakala	Pan-STARRS 1	·	960 m	MPC · JPL
866700	2015 TM_{85}	—	October 26, 2011	Haleakala	Pan-STARRS 1	·	820 m	MPC · JPL

== 866701–866800 ==
back to top

Designation			Discovery			Properties		Ref
Permanent	Provisional	Named after	Date	Site	Discoverer(s)	Category	Diam.	Ref
866701	2015 TK_{86}	—	September 23, 2005	Kitt Peak	Spacewatch	·	580 m	MPC · JPL
866702	2015 TG_{88}	—	September 9, 2015	Haleakala	Pan-STARRS 1	·	1 km	MPC · JPL
866703	2015 TC_{89}	—	September 5, 2000	Sacramento Peak	SDSS	·	850 m	MPC · JPL
866704	2015 TP_{89}	—	September 20, 2015	Mount Lemmon	Mount Lemmon Survey	(5)	990 m	MPC · JPL
866705	2015 TA_{94}	—	April 7, 2005	Kitt Peak	Spacewatch	·	1.1 km	MPC · JPL
866706	2015 TQ_{94}	—	October 8, 2015	Haleakala	Pan-STARRS 1	·	1.9 km	MPC · JPL
866707	2015 TG_{95}	—	October 8, 2015	Haleakala	Pan-STARRS 1	AGN	910 m	MPC · JPL
866708	2015 TF_{97}	—	September 9, 2015	Haleakala	Pan-STARRS 1	·	1.9 km	MPC · JPL
866709	2015 TK_{97}	—	May 27, 2014	Haleakala	Pan-STARRS 1	·	2.6 km	MPC · JPL
866710	2015 TT_{98}	—	October 8, 2015	Haleakala	Pan-STARRS 1	V	440 m	MPC · JPL
866711	2015 TV_{100}	—	June 23, 2014	Mount Lemmon	Mount Lemmon Survey	·	1.4 km	MPC · JPL
866712	2015 TE_{102}	—	October 8, 2015	Haleakala	Pan-STARRS 1	·	1.9 km	MPC · JPL
866713	2015 TV_{102}	—	October 8, 2015	Haleakala	Pan-STARRS 1	·	1.5 km	MPC · JPL
866714	2015 TZ_{102}	—	October 23, 2011	Mount Lemmon	Mount Lemmon Survey	PHO	780 m	MPC · JPL
866715	2015 TO_{103}	—	October 8, 2015	Haleakala	Pan-STARRS 1	·	2.5 km	MPC · JPL
866716	2015 TQ_{104}	—	January 6, 2013	Kitt Peak	Spacewatch	·	500 m	MPC · JPL
866717	2015 TV_{104}	—	October 8, 2015	Haleakala	Pan-STARRS 1	·	980 m	MPC · JPL
866718	2015 TB_{105}	—	March 4, 2011	Mount Lemmon	Mount Lemmon Survey	·	1.2 km	MPC · JPL
866719	2015 TF_{105}	—	October 8, 2015	Haleakala	Pan-STARRS 1	·	530 m	MPC · JPL
866720	2015 TP_{106}	—	September 18, 2006	Kitt Peak	Spacewatch	·	1.1 km	MPC · JPL
866721	2015 TQ_{107}	—	September 17, 2004	Kitt Peak	Spacewatch	·	1.2 km	MPC · JPL
866722	2015 TA_{108}	—	March 31, 2014	Mount Lemmon	Mount Lemmon Survey	·	560 m	MPC · JPL
866723	2015 TQ_{114}	—	June 27, 2014	Haleakala	Pan-STARRS 1	·	1.6 km	MPC · JPL
866724	2015 TS_{114}	—	October 8, 2015	Haleakala	Pan-STARRS 1	·	1.8 km	MPC · JPL
866725	2015 TZ_{115}	—	October 8, 2015	Haleakala	Pan-STARRS 1	EOS	1.3 km	MPC · JPL
866726	2015 TW_{116}	—	June 28, 2014	Kitt Peak	Spacewatch	·	1.5 km	MPC · JPL
866727	2015 TJ_{120}	—	July 28, 2014	Haleakala	Pan-STARRS 1	·	2.2 km	MPC · JPL
866728	2015 TN_{121}	—	July 28, 2014	Haleakala	Pan-STARRS 1	·	2.0 km	MPC · JPL
866729	2015 TP_{121}	—	October 18, 2011	Mount Lemmon	Mount Lemmon Survey	PHO	670 m	MPC · JPL
866730	2015 TQ_{121}	—	August 3, 2014	Haleakala	Pan-STARRS 1	·	2.0 km	MPC · JPL
866731	2015 TZ_{121}	—	October 8, 2015	Haleakala	Pan-STARRS 1	VER	1.9 km	MPC · JPL
866732	2015 TL_{122}	—	October 8, 2015	Haleakala	Pan-STARRS 1	·	470 m	MPC · JPL
866733	2015 TW_{122}	—	October 8, 2015	Haleakala	Pan-STARRS 1	·	1.5 km	MPC · JPL
866734	2015 TK_{123}	—	November 6, 2010	Mount Lemmon	Mount Lemmon Survey	EOS	1.3 km	MPC · JPL
866735	2015 TF_{124}	—	October 8, 2015	Haleakala	Pan-STARRS 1	·	890 m	MPC · JPL
866736	2015 TN_{126}	—	June 4, 2011	Mount Lemmon	Mount Lemmon Survey	·	490 m	MPC · JPL
866737	2015 TX_{127}	—	September 11, 2015	Haleakala	Pan-STARRS 1	EOS	1.3 km	MPC · JPL
866738	2015 TZ_{127}	—	October 8, 2015	Haleakala	Pan-STARRS 1	·	1.4 km	MPC · JPL
866739	2015 TQ_{130}	—	September 23, 2008	Mount Lemmon	Mount Lemmon Survey	·	450 m	MPC · JPL
866740	2015 TJ_{132}	—	October 8, 2015	Haleakala	Pan-STARRS 1	·	430 m	MPC · JPL
866741	2015 TZ_{133}	—	September 12, 2015	Haleakala	Pan-STARRS 1	·	1.7 km	MPC · JPL
866742	2015 TQ_{134}	—	October 8, 2015	Haleakala	Pan-STARRS 1	·	1.4 km	MPC · JPL
866743	2015 TS_{135}	—	July 4, 2014	Haleakala	Pan-STARRS 1	EOS	1.3 km	MPC · JPL
866744	2015 TO_{136}	—	October 9, 2008	Catalina	CSS	·	620 m	MPC · JPL
866745	2015 TV_{137}	—	September 11, 2015	Haleakala	Pan-STARRS 1	·	500 m	MPC · JPL
866746	2015 TN_{138}	—	December 31, 2007	Mount Lemmon	Mount Lemmon Survey	·	1.1 km	MPC · JPL
866747	2015 TV_{138}	—	October 8, 2015	Haleakala	Pan-STARRS 1	·	1.5 km	MPC · JPL
866748	2015 TW_{138}	—	October 8, 2015	Haleakala	Pan-STARRS 1	·	2.3 km	MPC · JPL
866749	2015 TX_{140}	—	August 12, 2015	Haleakala	Pan-STARRS 1	·	1.1 km	MPC · JPL
866750	2015 TB_{142}	—	October 8, 2015	Haleakala	Pan-STARRS 1	·	1.3 km	MPC · JPL
866751	2015 TD_{143}	—	September 18, 2009	Mount Lemmon	Mount Lemmon Survey	·	1.9 km	MPC · JPL
866752	2015 TB_{144}	—	September 6, 2015	Haleakala	Pan-STARRS 1	·	720 m	MPC · JPL
866753	2015 TB_{147}	—	November 1, 2010	Mount Lemmon	Mount Lemmon Survey	·	1.1 km	MPC · JPL
866754	2015 TA_{149}	—	November 16, 2011	Mount Lemmon	Mount Lemmon Survey	·	1.0 km	MPC · JPL
866755	2015 TC_{149}	—	September 6, 2015	Haleakala	Pan-STARRS 1	·	440 m	MPC · JPL
866756	2015 TX_{149}	—	September 30, 2005	Mount Lemmon	Mount Lemmon Survey	·	450 m	MPC · JPL
866757	2015 TP_{150}	—	September 11, 2015	Haleakala	Pan-STARRS 1	THM	1.7 km	MPC · JPL
866758	2015 TQ_{150}	—	September 22, 2011	Kitt Peak	Spacewatch	(5)	880 m	MPC · JPL
866759	2015 TL_{151}	—	October 1, 2005	Mount Lemmon	Mount Lemmon Survey	·	400 m	MPC · JPL
866760	2015 TG_{153}	—	March 29, 2012	Mount Lemmon	Mount Lemmon Survey	EUP	3.0 km	MPC · JPL
866761	2015 TD_{160}	—	September 10, 2015	Haleakala	Pan-STARRS 1	·	1.2 km	MPC · JPL
866762	2015 TF_{160}	—	September 10, 2015	Haleakala	Pan-STARRS 1	·	500 m	MPC · JPL
866763	2015 TG_{162}	—	August 6, 2015	SONEAR	SONEAR	·	970 m	MPC · JPL
866764	2015 TW_{162}	—	July 19, 2015	Haleakala	Pan-STARRS 1	·	990 m	MPC · JPL
866765	2015 TR_{163}	—	July 28, 2015	Haleakala	Pan-STARRS 1	·	1.6 km	MPC · JPL
866766	2015 TZ_{165}	—	November 6, 2010	Mount Lemmon	Mount Lemmon Survey	·	1.4 km	MPC · JPL
866767	2015 TV_{172}	—	October 8, 2008	Kitt Peak	Spacewatch	·	620 m	MPC · JPL
866768	2015 TY_{174}	—	October 9, 2015	Haleakala	Pan-STARRS 1	·	980 m	MPC · JPL
866769	2015 TU_{175}	—	July 31, 2014	Haleakala	Pan-STARRS 1	·	2.4 km	MPC · JPL
866770	2015 TH_{176}	—	October 9, 2015	Haleakala	Pan-STARRS 1	(5)	710 m	MPC · JPL
866771	2015 TS_{179}	—	September 18, 2009	Kitt Peak	Spacewatch	·	2.0 km	MPC · JPL
866772	2015 TG_{183}	—	October 31, 2011	Kitt Peak	Spacewatch	·	1.0 km	MPC · JPL
866773	2015 TA_{184}	—	May 2, 2014	Mount Lemmon	Mount Lemmon Survey	·	550 m	MPC · JPL
866774	2015 TY_{184}	—	October 9, 2015	Haleakala	Pan-STARRS 1	EOS	1.3 km	MPC · JPL
866775	2015 TU_{185}	—	September 14, 2002	Palomar	NEAT	·	1.0 km	MPC · JPL
866776	2015 TQ_{186}	—	October 9, 2015	Haleakala	Pan-STARRS 1	TIR	2.2 km	MPC · JPL
866777	2015 TU_{187}	—	July 30, 2008	Kitt Peak	Spacewatch	·	440 m	MPC · JPL
866778	2015 TA_{188}	—	September 9, 2015	Haleakala	Pan-STARRS 1	·	1.4 km	MPC · JPL
866779	2015 TC_{188}	—	October 9, 2015	Haleakala	Pan-STARRS 1	EOS	1.3 km	MPC · JPL
866780	2015 TZ_{190}	—	July 28, 2009	Kitt Peak	Spacewatch	·	2.7 km	MPC · JPL
866781	2015 TP_{191}	—	October 24, 2011	Haleakala	Pan-STARRS 1	·	1.0 km	MPC · JPL
866782	2015 TQ_{191}	—	November 18, 2011	Mount Lemmon	Mount Lemmon Survey	·	930 m	MPC · JPL
866783	2015 TD_{192}	—	September 23, 2015	Catalina	CSS	·	460 m	MPC · JPL
866784	2015 TN_{195}	—	September 24, 2015	Catalina	CSS	·	1.2 km	MPC · JPL
866785	2015 TN_{196}	—	September 9, 2015	Haleakala	Pan-STARRS 1	·	780 m	MPC · JPL
866786	2015 TD_{198}	—	December 4, 2005	Mount Lemmon	Mount Lemmon Survey	·	500 m	MPC · JPL
866787	2015 TY_{198}	—	August 12, 2015	Haleakala	Pan-STARRS 1	·	530 m	MPC · JPL
866788	2015 TW_{200}	—	August 29, 2006	Anderson Mesa	LONEOS	JUN	740 m	MPC · JPL
866789	2015 TQ_{201}	—	August 22, 2004	Kitt Peak	Spacewatch	·	1.8 km	MPC · JPL
866790	2015 TS_{203}	—	November 7, 2010	Mount Lemmon	Mount Lemmon Survey	·	1.9 km	MPC · JPL
866791	2015 TP_{204}	—	October 3, 2015	Mount Lemmon	Mount Lemmon Survey	·	2.3 km	MPC · JPL
866792	2015 TP_{205}	—	March 16, 2012	Mount Lemmon	Mount Lemmon Survey	·	2.8 km	MPC · JPL
866793	2015 TG_{206}	—	October 27, 2005	Kitt Peak	Spacewatch	·	1.1 km	MPC · JPL
866794	2015 TL_{206}	—	July 20, 2010	Bergisch Gladbach	W. Bickel	·	1.4 km	MPC · JPL
866795	2015 TA_{208}	—	September 9, 2015	XuYi	PMO NEO Survey Program	·	510 m	MPC · JPL
866796	2015 TD_{208}	—	July 27, 2001	Palomar	NEAT	·	1.5 km	MPC · JPL
866797	2015 TQ_{208}	—	July 25, 2015	Haleakala	Pan-STARRS 1	·	500 m	MPC · JPL
866798	2015 TJ_{210}	—	August 24, 2011	Haleakala	Pan-STARRS 1	·	810 m	MPC · JPL
866799	2015 TN_{211}	—	September 6, 2010	Piszkés-tető	K. Sárneczky, Z. Kuli	·	1.2 km	MPC · JPL
866800	2015 TO_{212}	—	October 10, 2015	Haleakala	Pan-STARRS 1	·	2.1 km	MPC · JPL

== 866801–866900 ==
back to top

Designation			Discovery			Properties		Ref
Permanent	Provisional	Named after	Date	Site	Discoverer(s)	Category	Diam.	Ref
866801	2015 TP_{212}	—	October 30, 2007	Mount Lemmon	Mount Lemmon Survey	·	690 m	MPC · JPL
866802	2015 TK_{213}	—	December 2, 2010	Mount Lemmon	Mount Lemmon Survey	·	1.8 km	MPC · JPL
866803	2015 TG_{218}	—	September 23, 2015	Haleakala	Pan-STARRS 1	·	940 m	MPC · JPL
866804	2015 TD_{221}	—	August 12, 2015	Haleakala	Pan-STARRS 1	·	1.0 km	MPC · JPL
866805	2015 TT_{221}	—	September 11, 2015	Haleakala	Pan-STARRS 1	·	370 m	MPC · JPL
866806	2015 TE_{222}	—	July 8, 2010	Kitt Peak	Spacewatch	(13314)	1.3 km	MPC · JPL
866807	2015 TQ_{223}	—	October 10, 2015	Space Surveillance	Space Surveillance Telescope	·	920 m	MPC · JPL
866808	2015 TZ_{225}	—	September 10, 2015	Haleakala	Pan-STARRS 1	·	1.1 km	MPC · JPL
866809	2015 TR_{226}	—	July 16, 2004	Siding Spring	SSS	·	2.2 km	MPC · JPL
866810	2015 TW_{228}	—	October 10, 2015	Haleakala	Pan-STARRS 1	·	790 m	MPC · JPL
866811	2015 TP_{229}	—	July 28, 2014	Haleakala	Pan-STARRS 1	·	1.7 km	MPC · JPL
866812	2015 TH_{230}	—	October 10, 2015	Haleakala	Pan-STARRS 1	·	980 m	MPC · JPL
866813	2015 TX_{230}	—	August 30, 2009	Kitt Peak	Spacewatch	·	2.0 km	MPC · JPL
866814	2015 TJ_{231}	—	September 16, 2006	Catalina	CSS	·	1.4 km	MPC · JPL
866815	2015 TR_{233}	—	October 9, 2015	XuYi	PMO NEO Survey Program	·	1.2 km	MPC · JPL
866816	2015 TV_{234}	—	October 11, 2007	Catalina	CSS	T_{j} (2.96)	2.8 km	MPC · JPL
866817	2015 TX_{235}	—	October 11, 2015	Mount Lemmon	Mount Lemmon Survey	PHO	700 m	MPC · JPL
866818	2015 TP_{236}	—	November 14, 2002	Palomar	NEAT	·	1.2 km	MPC · JPL
866819	2015 TP_{237}	—	January 10, 2011	Kitt Peak	Spacewatch	·	930 m	MPC · JPL
866820	2015 TS_{241}	—	September 8, 2015	XuYi	PMO NEO Survey Program	·	870 m	MPC · JPL
866821	2015 TE_{243}	—	October 10, 2015	Kitt Peak	Spacewatch	·	1.3 km	MPC · JPL
866822	2015 TN_{245}	—	October 17, 2006	Kitt Peak	Spacewatch	AGN	780 m	MPC · JPL
866823	2015 TM_{248}	—	October 10, 2015	Haleakala	Pan-STARRS 1	·	600 m	MPC · JPL
866824	2015 TC_{250}	—	October 4, 2002	Palomar	NEAT	·	1.6 km	MPC · JPL
866825	2015 TN_{250}	—	September 25, 2001	Mount Bohyeon	Bohyunsan Optical Astronomy Observatory	·	1.2 km	MPC · JPL
866826	2015 TQ_{250}	—	September 2, 2008	Kitt Peak	Spacewatch	·	520 m	MPC · JPL
866827	2015 TT_{250}	—	September 9, 2015	Haleakala	Pan-STARRS 1	·	390 m	MPC · JPL
866828	2015 TB_{251}	—	October 28, 2006	Mount Lemmon	Mount Lemmon Survey	AEO	800 m	MPC · JPL
866829	2015 TF_{251}	—	October 10, 2015	Haleakala	Pan-STARRS 1	·	1.9 km	MPC · JPL
866830	2015 TK_{253}	—	October 10, 2015	Haleakala	Pan-STARRS 1	·	1.8 km	MPC · JPL
866831	2015 TY_{253}	—	September 23, 2008	Mount Lemmon	Mount Lemmon Survey	·	590 m	MPC · JPL
866832	2015 TY_{257}	—	October 11, 2015	Mount Lemmon	Mount Lemmon Survey	T_{j} (2.93)	3.2 km	MPC · JPL
866833	2015 TL_{261}	—	September 6, 2015	Haleakala	Pan-STARRS 1	·	610 m	MPC · JPL
866834	2015 TS_{261}	—	October 12, 2015	Haleakala	Pan-STARRS 1	·	1.7 km	MPC · JPL
866835	2015 TT_{266}	—	November 2, 2007	Kitt Peak	Spacewatch	(5)	720 m	MPC · JPL
866836	2015 TC_{267}	—	July 28, 2008	Siding Spring	SSS	·	550 m	MPC · JPL
866837	2015 TV_{267}	—	January 9, 2013	Mount Lemmon	Mount Lemmon Survey	·	580 m	MPC · JPL
866838	2015 TY_{267}	—	May 21, 2006	Mount Lemmon	Mount Lemmon Survey	BRG	1.1 km	MPC · JPL
866839	2015 TN_{269}	—	July 30, 2005	Palomar	NEAT	·	580 m	MPC · JPL
866840	2015 TO_{269}	—	October 12, 2015	Haleakala	Pan-STARRS 1	·	1.5 km	MPC · JPL
866841	2015 TD_{271}	—	June 23, 2011	Kitt Peak	Spacewatch	·	950 m	MPC · JPL
866842	2015 TM_{272}	—	March 29, 2014	Mount Lemmon	Mount Lemmon Survey	·	510 m	MPC · JPL
866843	2015 TO_{272}	—	October 12, 2015	Haleakala	Pan-STARRS 1	EOS	1.3 km	MPC · JPL
866844	2015 TF_{273}	—	September 28, 2006	Kitt Peak	Spacewatch	·	1.3 km	MPC · JPL
866845	2015 TB_{274}	—	October 2, 2015	Mount Lemmon	Mount Lemmon Survey	·	1.3 km	MPC · JPL
866846	2015 TU_{275}	—	September 12, 2015	Haleakala	Pan-STARRS 1	·	2.2 km	MPC · JPL
866847	2015 TZ_{277}	—	August 28, 2015	Haleakala	Pan-STARRS 1	·	1.1 km	MPC · JPL
866848	2015 TT_{279}	—	October 3, 2015	Mount Lemmon	Mount Lemmon Survey	EOS	1.2 km	MPC · JPL
866849	2015 TU_{279}	—	October 3, 2015	Mount Lemmon	Mount Lemmon Survey	EOS	1.2 km	MPC · JPL
866850	2015 TD_{282}	—	January 27, 2007	Kitt Peak	Spacewatch	·	460 m	MPC · JPL
866851	2015 TQ_{283}	—	December 5, 2007	Kitt Peak	Spacewatch	·	970 m	MPC · JPL
866852	2015 TO_{284}	—	October 31, 2010	Mount Lemmon	Mount Lemmon Survey	·	2.0 km	MPC · JPL
866853	2015 TE_{287}	—	October 3, 2015	Mount Lemmon	Mount Lemmon Survey	·	1.5 km	MPC · JPL
866854	2015 TG_{289}	—	May 23, 2014	Haleakala	Pan-STARRS 1	·	2.0 km	MPC · JPL
866855	2015 TW_{291}	—	December 4, 2012	Kitt Peak	Spacewatch	·	580 m	MPC · JPL
866856	2015 TH_{292}	—	September 11, 2015	Haleakala	Pan-STARRS 1	·	1.4 km	MPC · JPL
866857	2015 TK_{295}	—	January 18, 2012	Mount Lemmon	Mount Lemmon Survey	KOR	920 m	MPC · JPL
866858	2015 TR_{295}	—	July 27, 2011	Haleakala	Pan-STARRS 1	MAS	550 m	MPC · JPL
866859	2015 TJ_{298}	—	October 3, 2015	Catalina	CSS	·	1.1 km	MPC · JPL
866860	2015 TE_{299}	—	October 1, 2010	Kitt Peak	Spacewatch	·	1.5 km	MPC · JPL
866861	2015 TQ_{299}	—	October 2, 2015	Kitt Peak	Spacewatch	·	830 m	MPC · JPL
866862	2015 TY_{299}	—	October 12, 2015	Space Surveillance	Space Surveillance Telescope	·	1.0 km	MPC · JPL
866863	2015 TX_{300}	—	October 12, 2015	Haleakala	Pan-STARRS 1	·	2.0 km	MPC · JPL
866864	2015 TC_{301}	—	March 23, 2003	Sacramento Peak	SDSS	DOR	1.5 km	MPC · JPL
866865	2015 TT_{305}	—	October 12, 2015	Haleakala	Pan-STARRS 1	·	1.1 km	MPC · JPL
866866	2015 TZ_{305}	—	August 21, 2015	Haleakala	Pan-STARRS 1	·	600 m	MPC · JPL
866867	2015 TY_{308}	—	October 10, 2015	Haleakala	Pan-STARRS 1	·	2.2 km	MPC · JPL
866868	2015 TE_{310}	—	September 10, 2015	Haleakala	Pan-STARRS 1	·	1.8 km	MPC · JPL
866869	2015 TK_{315}	—	July 25, 2015	Haleakala	Pan-STARRS 1	·	2.4 km	MPC · JPL
866870	2015 TS_{315}	—	October 13, 2015	Kitt Peak	Spacewatch	·	570 m	MPC · JPL
866871	2015 TP_{316}	—	September 15, 2006	Kitt Peak	Spacewatch	·	1.0 km	MPC · JPL
866872	2015 TG_{318}	—	October 13, 2015	Space Surveillance	Space Surveillance Telescope	H	400 m	MPC · JPL
866873	2015 TK_{318}	—	October 13, 2015	Space Surveillance	Space Surveillance Telescope	·	2.0 km	MPC · JPL
866874	2015 TF_{319}	—	September 25, 2006	Mount Lemmon	Mount Lemmon Survey	·	1.2 km	MPC · JPL
866875	2015 TB_{321}	—	July 25, 2015	Haleakala	Pan-STARRS 1	·	870 m	MPC · JPL
866876	2015 TE_{323}	—	October 10, 2015	Haleakala	Pan-STARRS 1	APO +1km · PHA	780 m	MPC · JPL
866877	2015 TG_{328}	—	June 27, 2014	Haleakala	Pan-STARRS 1	·	1.6 km	MPC · JPL
866878	2015 TS_{329}	—	November 26, 2005	Kitt Peak	Spacewatch	EOS	1.5 km	MPC · JPL
866879	2015 TH_{330}	—	October 13, 2015	Haleakala	Pan-STARRS 1	(8737)	2.0 km	MPC · JPL
866880	2015 TX_{332}	—	July 30, 2014	Haleakala	Pan-STARRS 1	EOS	1.4 km	MPC · JPL
866881	2015 TG_{334}	—	February 26, 2012	Roque de los Muchachos	EURONEAR	EOS	1.2 km	MPC · JPL
866882	2015 TC_{335}	—	October 13, 2015	Haleakala	Pan-STARRS 1	·	2.3 km	MPC · JPL
866883	2015 TP_{336}	—	August 5, 2002	Palomar	NEAT	·	1.0 km	MPC · JPL
866884	2015 TT_{337}	—	October 18, 2009	Mount Lemmon	Mount Lemmon Survey	·	510 m	MPC · JPL
866885	2015 TD_{340}	—	August 10, 2015	Haleakala	Pan-STARRS 1	·	1.3 km	MPC · JPL
866886	2015 TX_{343}	—	September 9, 2015	Haleakala	Pan-STARRS 1	EOS	1.3 km	MPC · JPL
866887	2015 TG_{345}	—	September 9, 2015	Haleakala	Pan-STARRS 1	·	1.7 km	MPC · JPL
866888	2015 TO_{345}	—	October 15, 2015	Mount Lemmon	Mount Lemmon Survey	·	1.4 km	MPC · JPL
866889	2015 TC_{346}	—	October 12, 2015	Haleakala	Pan-STARRS 1	·	880 m	MPC · JPL
866890	2015 TT_{346}	—	July 23, 2015	Haleakala	Pan-STARRS 1	·	1.0 km	MPC · JPL
866891	2015 TC_{351}	—	September 9, 2015	Haleakala	Pan-STARRS 1	·	1.3 km	MPC · JPL
866892	2015 TW_{353}	—	October 2, 2015	Mount Lemmon	Mount Lemmon Survey	·	2.2 km	MPC · JPL
866893	2015 TA_{354}	—	October 13, 2010	Mount Lemmon	Mount Lemmon Survey	EOS	1.3 km	MPC · JPL
866894	2015 TE_{355}	—	October 8, 2015	Haleakala	Pan-STARRS 1	·	1.8 km	MPC · JPL
866895	2015 TH_{355}	—	October 8, 2015	Haleakala	Pan-STARRS 1	·	1.0 km	MPC · JPL
866896	2015 TO_{355}	—	October 9, 2015	ESA OGS	ESA OGS	·	2.1 km	MPC · JPL
866897	2015 TA_{356}	—	October 9, 2015	Haleakala	Pan-STARRS 1	·	1.6 km	MPC · JPL
866898	2015 TS_{356}	—	July 25, 2015	Haleakala	Pan-STARRS 1	·	1.3 km	MPC · JPL
866899	2015 TQ_{357}	—	October 10, 2015	Haleakala	Pan-STARRS 1	·	1.7 km	MPC · JPL
866900	2015 TJ_{364}	—	October 8, 2015	Haleakala	Pan-STARRS 1	EOS	1.5 km	MPC · JPL

== 866901–867000 ==
back to top

Designation			Discovery			Properties		Ref
Permanent	Provisional	Named after	Date	Site	Discoverer(s)	Category	Diam.	Ref
866901	2015 TC_{366}	—	July 25, 2014	Haleakala	Pan-STARRS 1	·	1.3 km	MPC · JPL
866902	2015 TH_{366}	—	January 1, 2012	Mount Lemmon	Mount Lemmon Survey	EOS	1.5 km	MPC · JPL
866903	2015 TC_{367}	—	October 12, 2015	Haleakala	Pan-STARRS 1	·	810 m	MPC · JPL
866904	2015 TU_{367}	—	October 9, 2015	Haleakala	Pan-STARRS 1	·	1.5 km	MPC · JPL
866905	2015 TE_{370}	—	October 13, 2010	Mount Lemmon	Mount Lemmon Survey	EOS	1.4 km	MPC · JPL
866906	2015 TK_{370}	—	October 2, 2015	Mount Lemmon	Mount Lemmon Survey	AGN	830 m	MPC · JPL
866907	2015 TX_{372}	—	December 4, 2010	Mount Lemmon	Mount Lemmon Survey	·	1.2 km	MPC · JPL
866908	2015 TA_{373}	—	June 7, 2013	Haleakala	Pan-STARRS 1	EOS	1.4 km	MPC · JPL
866909	2015 TS_{373}	—	May 31, 2014	Haleakala	Pan-STARRS 1	·	1.4 km	MPC · JPL
866910	2015 TM_{374}	—	July 29, 2005	Palomar	NEAT	·	1.7 km	MPC · JPL
866911	2015 TN_{374}	—	July 26, 2014	Haleakala	Pan-STARRS 1	EOS	1.3 km	MPC · JPL
866912	2015 TK_{375}	—	April 12, 2012	Haleakala	Pan-STARRS 1	·	1.0 km	MPC · JPL
866913	2015 TU_{375}	—	September 16, 2006	Kitt Peak	Spacewatch	·	1.1 km	MPC · JPL
866914	2015 TC_{376}	—	October 9, 2015	Haleakala	Pan-STARRS 1	·	2.4 km	MPC · JPL
866915	2015 TD_{376}	—	October 9, 2015	Haleakala	Pan-STARRS 1	·	1.3 km	MPC · JPL
866916	2015 TG_{376}	—	August 20, 2014	Haleakala	Pan-STARRS 1	·	2.1 km	MPC · JPL
866917	2015 TU_{376}	—	October 9, 2015	Haleakala	Pan-STARRS 1	·	1.5 km	MPC · JPL
866918	2015 TE_{377}	—	August 3, 2014	Haleakala	Pan-STARRS 1	·	2.0 km	MPC · JPL
866919	2015 TF_{377}	—	August 20, 2014	Haleakala	Pan-STARRS 1	·	2.0 km	MPC · JPL
866920	2015 TR_{381}	—	October 10, 2015	Haleakala	Pan-STARRS 1	·	1.5 km	MPC · JPL
866921	2015 TD_{382}	—	October 10, 2015	Haleakala	Pan-STARRS 1	·	480 m	MPC · JPL
866922	2015 TQ_{382}	—	October 10, 2015	Haleakala	Pan-STARRS 1	·	1.4 km	MPC · JPL
866923	2015 TS_{382}	—	October 10, 2015	Haleakala	Pan-STARRS 1	EOS	1.4 km	MPC · JPL
866924	2015 TV_{382}	—	November 12, 2005	Kitt Peak	Spacewatch	EOS	1.1 km	MPC · JPL
866925	2015 TH_{384}	—	November 10, 2010	Mount Lemmon	Mount Lemmon Survey	·	2.2 km	MPC · JPL
866926	2015 TR_{384}	—	October 12, 2015	Haleakala	Pan-STARRS 1	·	2.1 km	MPC · JPL
866927	2015 TH_{385}	—	October 13, 2015	Haleakala	Pan-STARRS 1	·	1.2 km	MPC · JPL
866928	2015 TB_{388}	—	October 9, 2015	Haleakala	Pan-STARRS 1	H	400 m	MPC · JPL
866929	2015 TX_{388}	—	October 9, 2015	Mount Lemmon	Mount Lemmon Survey	·	1.4 km	MPC · JPL
866930	2015 TZ_{388}	—	October 15, 2015	Haleakala	Pan-STARRS 1	·	490 m	MPC · JPL
866931	2015 TL_{392}	—	October 9, 2015	Haleakala	Pan-STARRS 1	·	1.1 km	MPC · JPL
866932	2015 TN_{393}	—	October 8, 2015	Haleakala	Pan-STARRS 1	(194)	1.0 km	MPC · JPL
866933	2015 TY_{395}	—	October 10, 2015	Haleakala	Pan-STARRS 1	·	1.3 km	MPC · JPL
866934	2015 TU_{397}	—	October 9, 2015	Haleakala	Pan-STARRS 1	·	940 m	MPC · JPL
866935	2015 TS_{398}	—	October 5, 2015	Haleakala	Pan-STARRS 1	·	1.4 km	MPC · JPL
866936	2015 TR_{399}	—	October 15, 2015	Haleakala	Pan-STARRS 1	·	1.1 km	MPC · JPL
866937	2015 TN_{403}	—	October 10, 2015	Haleakala	Pan-STARRS 1	·	450 m	MPC · JPL
866938	2015 TH_{407}	—	October 8, 2015	Haleakala	Pan-STARRS 1	·	720 m	MPC · JPL
866939	2015 TD_{408}	—	October 10, 2015	Haleakala	Pan-STARRS 1	·	2.1 km	MPC · JPL
866940	2015 TP_{408}	—	October 8, 2015	Haleakala	Pan-STARRS 1	EOS	1.5 km	MPC · JPL
866941	2015 TU_{409}	—	September 9, 2015	Haleakala	Pan-STARRS 1	·	890 m	MPC · JPL
866942	2015 TW_{410}	—	October 25, 2014	Haleakala	Pan-STARRS 1	L5 · (17492)	7.4 km	MPC · JPL
866943	2015 TC_{412}	—	October 9, 2015	Haleakala	Pan-STARRS 1	·	1.3 km	MPC · JPL
866944	2015 TL_{412}	—	October 10, 2015	Haleakala	Pan-STARRS 1	·	1.8 km	MPC · JPL
866945	2015 TN_{412}	—	October 8, 2015	Mount Lemmon	Mount Lemmon Survey	(5)	740 m	MPC · JPL
866946	2015 TX_{414}	—	October 10, 2015	Haleakala	Pan-STARRS 1	H	340 m	MPC · JPL
866947	2015 TE_{415}	—	March 24, 2014	Haleakala	Pan-STARRS 1	·	590 m	MPC · JPL
866948	2015 TL_{416}	—	October 9, 2015	Mount Lemmon	Mount Lemmon Survey	·	2.1 km	MPC · JPL
866949	2015 TZ_{417}	—	October 5, 2015	Haleakala	Pan-STARRS 1	·	1.9 km	MPC · JPL
866950	2015 TX_{418}	—	October 8, 2015	Haleakala	Pan-STARRS 1	EOS	1.2 km	MPC · JPL
866951	2015 TL_{419}	—	November 20, 2014	Haleakala	Pan-STARRS 1	L5	7.0 km	MPC · JPL
866952	2015 TZ_{420}	—	October 10, 2015	Haleakala	Pan-STARRS 1	·	1.4 km	MPC · JPL
866953	2015 TG_{421}	—	October 3, 2015	Mount Lemmon	Mount Lemmon Survey	EOS	1.5 km	MPC · JPL
866954	2015 TD_{423}	—	October 10, 2015	Haleakala	Pan-STARRS 1	·	2.0 km	MPC · JPL
866955	2015 TO_{423}	—	October 12, 2015	Cerro Paranal	Gaia Ground Based Optical Tracking	·	1.5 km	MPC · JPL
866956	2015 TW_{425}	—	October 15, 2015	Haleakala	Pan-STARRS 1	·	2.1 km	MPC · JPL
866957	2015 TR_{427}	—	October 13, 2015	Haleakala	Pan-STARRS 1	·	1.7 km	MPC · JPL
866958	2015 TU_{427}	—	October 8, 2015	Haleakala	Pan-STARRS 1	·	1.8 km	MPC · JPL
866959	2015 TB_{429}	—	October 5, 2015	Haleakala	Pan-STARRS 1	·	1.4 km	MPC · JPL
866960	2015 TY_{430}	—	October 1, 2015	Mount Lemmon	Mount Lemmon Survey	·	1.0 km	MPC · JPL
866961	2015 TC_{431}	—	October 9, 2015	Haleakala	Pan-STARRS 1	·	1.9 km	MPC · JPL
866962	2015 TJ_{431}	—	October 10, 2015	Haleakala	Pan-STARRS 1	·	1.9 km	MPC · JPL
866963	2015 TV_{431}	—	October 10, 2015	Haleakala	Pan-STARRS 1	·	480 m	MPC · JPL
866964	2015 TF_{432}	—	October 2, 2015	Mount Lemmon	Mount Lemmon Survey	·	1.5 km	MPC · JPL
866965	2015 TK_{432}	—	October 12, 2015	Haleakala	Pan-STARRS 1	·	1.5 km	MPC · JPL
866966	2015 TM_{432}	—	October 13, 2015	Haleakala	Pan-STARRS 1	·	1.2 km	MPC · JPL
866967	2015 TV_{432}	—	October 9, 2015	Haleakala	Pan-STARRS 1	·	1.5 km	MPC · JPL
866968	2015 TY_{432}	—	October 10, 2015	Haleakala	Pan-STARRS 1	EOS	1.1 km	MPC · JPL
866969	2015 TA_{433}	—	October 10, 2015	Haleakala	Pan-STARRS 1	·	1.7 km	MPC · JPL
866970	2015 TT_{434}	—	October 9, 2015	Haleakala	Pan-STARRS 1	·	1.8 km	MPC · JPL
866971	2015 TV_{434}	—	October 5, 2015	Haleakala	Pan-STARRS 1	·	1.3 km	MPC · JPL
866972	2015 TY_{434}	—	October 10, 2015	Haleakala	Pan-STARRS 1	EOS	1.3 km	MPC · JPL
866973	2015 TA_{437}	—	October 13, 2015	Haleakala	Pan-STARRS 1	EUN	760 m	MPC · JPL
866974	2015 TD_{437}	—	October 13, 2015	Haleakala	Pan-STARRS 1	·	1.6 km	MPC · JPL
866975	2015 TF_{437}	—	September 23, 2015	Catalina	CSS	ADE	1.5 km	MPC · JPL
866976	2015 TY_{437}	—	October 12, 2015	Haleakala	Pan-STARRS 1	·	450 m	MPC · JPL
866977	2015 TH_{439}	—	June 24, 2014	Haleakala	Pan-STARRS 1	·	1.1 km	MPC · JPL
866978	2015 TT_{442}	—	October 12, 2015	Haleakala	Pan-STARRS 1	·	530 m	MPC · JPL
866979	2015 TW_{442}	—	October 8, 2015	Haleakala	Pan-STARRS 1	EOS	1.2 km	MPC · JPL
866980	2015 TQ_{443}	—	October 2, 2015	Mount Lemmon	Mount Lemmon Survey	·	620 m	MPC · JPL
866981	2015 TA_{444}	—	October 15, 2015	Haleakala	Pan-STARRS 1	·	450 m	MPC · JPL
866982	2015 TG_{444}	—	October 10, 2015	Haleakala	Pan-STARRS 1	L5	6.5 km	MPC · JPL
866983	2015 TS_{445}	—	October 3, 2015	Mount Lemmon	Mount Lemmon Survey	·	2.0 km	MPC · JPL
866984	2015 TU_{446}	—	October 10, 2015	Haleakala	Pan-STARRS 1	·	460 m	MPC · JPL
866985	2015 TA_{447}	—	October 3, 2015	Mount Lemmon	Mount Lemmon Survey	·	390 m	MPC · JPL
866986	2015 TU_{447}	—	October 12, 2015	Haleakala	Pan-STARRS 1	EOS	1.3 km	MPC · JPL
866987	2015 TN_{449}	—	October 9, 2015	Haleakala	Pan-STARRS 1	·	1.3 km	MPC · JPL
866988	2015 TH_{451}	—	October 8, 2015	Mount Lemmon	Mount Lemmon Survey	·	1.4 km	MPC · JPL
866989	2015 TH_{452}	—	October 11, 2015	Mount Lemmon	Mount Lemmon Survey	·	2.1 km	MPC · JPL
866990	2015 TL_{455}	—	October 1, 2015	Mount Lemmon	Mount Lemmon Survey	·	550 m	MPC · JPL
866991	2015 TR_{455}	—	October 11, 2015	Mount Lemmon	Mount Lemmon Survey	·	2.7 km	MPC · JPL
866992	2015 TD_{463}	—	October 9, 2015	Haleakala	Pan-STARRS 1	·	1.8 km	MPC · JPL
866993	2015 TN_{463}	—	October 10, 2015	Haleakala	Pan-STARRS 1	AGN	840 m	MPC · JPL
866994	2015 TU_{463}	—	October 10, 2015	Haleakala	Pan-STARRS 1	·	1.3 km	MPC · JPL
866995	2015 TL_{465}	—	October 9, 2015	Haleakala	Pan-STARRS 1	V	320 m	MPC · JPL
866996	2015 TN_{465}	—	October 10, 2015	Haleakala	Pan-STARRS 1	·	690 m	MPC · JPL
866997	2015 TZ_{465}	—	October 9, 2015	XuYi	PMO NEO Survey Program	·	1.8 km	MPC · JPL
866998	2015 TK_{469}	—	October 9, 2015	Haleakala	Pan-STARRS 1	·	390 m	MPC · JPL
866999	2015 TQ_{470}	—	October 12, 2015	Haleakala	Pan-STARRS 1	·	850 m	MPC · JPL
867000	2015 TY_{471}	—	October 10, 2015	Haleakala	Pan-STARRS 1	·	890 m	MPC · JPL

back to top
