= List of Jupiter trojans (Trojan camp) (300001–400000) =

This is a partial list of Jupiter's L_{5} trojans (60° behind Jupiter) with numbers 300001–400000. If available, an object's mean diameter is taken from the NEOWISE data release, which the Small-Body Database has also adopted. Mean diameters are rounded to two significant figures if smaller than 100 kilometers. Estimates are in italics and calculated from a magnitude-to-diameter conversion, using an assumed albedo of 0.057.

== 300001–400000 ==
This list contains 378 objects sorted in numerical order.

Designation	Discovery			Orbital description					Diam.	Remarks	Refs
Designation	Date	Observer	Site	a (AU)	e	i (°)	q (AU)	Q (AU)	Diam.	Remarks	Refs
(300242) 2007 DZ_{70}	21 February 2007	Spacewatch	Kitt Peak	5.213	0.165	9.4	4.353	6.073	7.7 km	–	catalog · MPC · JPL
(300244) 2007 EY_{8}	9 March 2007	MLS	Mount Lemmon	5.145	0.110	18.5	4.579	5.711	9.1 km	–	catalog · MPC · JPL
(300249) 2007 EE_{218}	9 March 2007	MLS	Mount Lemmon	5.260	0.056	8.5	4.967	5.553	8.6 km	–	catalog · MPC · JPL
(300250) 2007 EF_{222}	10 March 2007	MLS	Mount Lemmon	5.141	0.041	8.4	4.931	5.351	14 km	–	catalog · MPC · JPL
(300991) 2008 FF_{41}	28 March 2008	Spacewatch	Kitt Peak	5.224	0.209	6.2	4.130	6.318	9.1 km	–	catalog · MPC · JPL
(300993) 2008 FP_{117}	31 March 2008	Spacewatch	Kitt Peak	5.276	0.157	15.3	4.446	6.106	13 km	–	catalog · MPC · JPL
(300999) 2008 GP_{49}	12 March 2007	Spacewatch	Kitt Peak	5.223	0.009	13.3	5.178	5.267	10 km	–	catalog · MPC · JPL
(301000) 2008 GG_{69}	6 April 2008	Spacewatch	Kitt Peak	5.178	0.032	5.8	5.011	5.344	8.7 km	–	catalog · MPC · JPL
(301002) 2008 GQ_{98}	8 April 2008	Spacewatch	Kitt Peak	5.217	0.135	12.8	4.514	5.920	13 km	–	catalog · MPC · JPL
(301005) 2008 GL_{117}	11 April 2008	Spacewatch	Kitt Peak	5.152	0.051	22.4	4.888	5.417	11 km	–	catalog · MPC · JPL
(301007) 2008 GM_{140}	7 April 2008	Spacewatch	Kitt Peak	5.210	0.091	19.1	4.738	5.682	9.6 km	–	catalog · MPC · JPL
(301008) 2008 GK_{141}	14 April 2008	Spacewatch	Kitt Peak	5.214	0.060	9.5	4.901	5.527	8.7 km	–	catalog · MPC · JPL
(301009) 2008 GS_{141}	7 April 2008	Spacewatch	Kitt Peak	5.244	0.079	5.2	4.829	5.659	8.3 km	–	catalog · MPC · JPL
(301010) 2008 HB_{61}	30 April 2008	Spacewatch	Kitt Peak	5.321	0.064	27.1	4.981	5.661	12 km	–	catalog · MPC · JPL
(301012) 2008 JL_{17}	3 May 2008	MLS	Mount Lemmon	5.248	0.076	6.7	4.846	5.649	9.3 km	–	catalog · MPC · JPL
(301013) 2008 JJ_{18}	4 May 2008	Spacewatch	Kitt Peak	5.253	0.054	7.9	4.972	5.534	12 km	–	catalog · MPC · JPL
(301753) 2010 JZ	25 February 2006	Spacewatch	Kitt Peak	5.227	0.062	10.9	4.902	5.553	12 km	–	catalog · MPC · JPL
(301760) 2010 JP_{42}	17 February 2007	MLS	Mount Lemmon	5.192	0.122	19.0	4.558	5.826	16 km	–	catalog · MPC · JPL
(303999) 2006 BQ_{211}	31 January 2006	Spacewatch	Kitt Peak	5.267	0.044	18.5	5.037	5.498	13 km	–	catalog · MPC · JPL
(304770) 2007 EO_{67}	10 March 2007	Spacewatch	Kitt Peak	5.145	0.055	29.4	4.863	5.426	17 km	–	catalog · MPC · JPL
(304773) 2007 EF_{188}	13 March 2007	Spacewatch	Kitt Peak	5.273	0.088	5.4	4.807	5.739	11 km	–	catalog · MPC · JPL
(304774) 2007 GZ_{30}	14 April 2007	MLS	Mount Lemmon	5.283	0.044	16.5	5.049	5.516	11 km	–	catalog · MPC · JPL
(306200) 2011 QM_{3}	12 March 2008	Spacewatch	Kitt Peak	5.119	0.104	8.3	4.587	5.651	11 km	–	catalog · MPC · JPL
(308660) 2006 BJ_{139}	28 January 2006	MLS	Mount Lemmon	5.208	0.040	18.4	5.000	5.416	11 km	–	catalog · MPC · JPL
(310016) 2009 KD_{26}	29 May 2009	Spacewatch	Kitt Peak	5.177	0.140	2.1	4.453	5.901	11 km	–	catalog · MPC · JPL
(310047) 2010 HA_{43}	22 April 2010	WISE	WISE	5.193	0.051	20.2	4.926	5.460	15 km	–	catalog · MPC · JPL
(316085) 2009 KT_{9}	25 May 2009	Spacewatch	Kitt Peak	5.232	0.155	10.1	4.421	6.043	12 km	–	catalog · MPC · JPL
(316692) 1996 GX_{5}	11 April 1996	Spacewatch	Kitt Peak	5.127	0.054	9.4	4.852	5.403	12 km	–	catalog · MPC · JPL
(316693) 1996 JU_{4}	10 May 1996	Spacewatch	Kitt Peak	5.223	0.040	13.1	5.015	5.432	11 km	–	catalog · MPC · JPL
(317078) 2001 SE_{253}	19 September 2001	LINEAR	Socorro	5.187	0.112	11.0	4.604	5.771	13 km	–	catalog · MPC · JPL
(317121) 2001 TF_{258}	8 October 2001	NEAT	Palomar	5.127	0.058	7.5	4.832	5.422	11 km	–	catalog · MPC · JPL
(317142) 2001 UR_{147}	23 October 2001	LINEAR	Socorro	5.270	0.068	30.1	4.911	5.629	16 km	–	catalog · MPC · JPL
(318405) 2004 XF_{185}	11 December 2004	Spacewatch	Kitt Peak	5.218	0.061	14.4	4.899	5.538	13 km	–	catalog · MPC · JPL
(318407) 2004 YF_{22}	18 December 2004	MLS	Mount Lemmon	5.255	0.080	6.6	4.833	5.678	9.3 km	–	catalog · MPC · JPL
(319282) 2006 BY_{73}	23 January 2006	Spacewatch	Kitt Peak	5.215	0.025	9.8	5.085	5.344	11 km	–	catalog · MPC · JPL
(319342) 2006 BY_{273}	25 January 2006	Spacewatch	Kitt Peak	5.239	0.080	2.8	4.819	5.660	9.3 km	–	catalog · MPC · JPL
(319378) 2006 DS_{138}	25 February 2006	Spacewatch	Kitt Peak	5.303	0.021	7.2	5.191	5.416	9.3 km	–	catalog · MPC · JPL
(320001) 2007 DW_{27}	17 February 2007	Spacewatch	Kitt Peak	5.188	0.140	9.4	4.460	5.917	6.7 km	–	catalog · MPC · JPL
(320047) 2007 DH_{117}	17 February 2007	Spacewatch	Kitt Peak	5.220	0.124	11.8	4.571	5.868	12 km	–	catalog · MPC · JPL
(320066) 2007 EA_{40}	11 March 2007	Spacewatch	Kitt Peak	5.235	0.122	8.9	4.599	5.871	11 km	–	catalog · MPC · JPL
(320093) 2007 ES_{98}	11 March 2007	Spacewatch	Kitt Peak	5.193	0.064	3.6	4.860	5.526	9.9 km	–	catalog · MPC · JPL
(320556) 2008 AC_{45}	10 January 2008	Spacewatch	Kitt Peak	5.260	0.091	25.8	4.780	5.740	14 km	–	catalog · MPC · JPL
(320800) 2008 EZ_{160}	12 November 2001	Sloan Digital Sky Survey	Apache Point	5.159	0.068	6.2	4.806	5.512	9.6 km	–	catalog · MPC · JPL
(320892) 2008 GP_{58}	5 April 2008	MLS	Mount Lemmon	5.182	0.071	2.0	4.815	5.549	9.4 km	–	catalog · MPC · JPL
(320950) 2008 HZ_{4}	24 April 2008	Spacewatch	Kitt Peak	5.107	0.088	5.3	4.660	5.555	11 km	–	catalog · MPC · JPL
(321300) 2009 FO_{61}	28 March 2009	Spacewatch	Kitt Peak	5.135	0.064	7.9	4.807	5.464	12 km	–	catalog · MPC · JPL
(321354) 2009 LU_{4}	13 June 2009	Spacewatch	Kitt Peak	5.237	0.025	3.4	5.106	5.369	13 km	–	catalog · MPC · JPL
(321706) 2010 GA_{3}	1 November 2005	Spacewatch	Kitt Peak	5.150	0.018	26.7	5.060	5.241	16 km	–	catalog · MPC · JPL
(321716) 2010 HX_{21}	14 February 2005	Spacewatch	Kitt Peak	5.232	0.039	4.5	5.027	5.438	12 km	–	catalog · MPC · JPL
(322378) 2011 MV_{9}	5 March 2006	D. Healy	Junk Bond	5.261	0.129	16.3	4.585	5.937	17 km	–	catalog · MPC · JPL
(322379) 2011 OZ_{12}	9 December 2002	Spacewatch	Kitt Peak	5.241	0.110	4.2	4.666	5.817	11 km	–	catalog · MPC · JPL
(324237) 2006 BJ_{128}	26 January 2006	Spacewatch	Kitt Peak	5.176	0.088	9.3	4.722	5.631	9.4 km	–	catalog · MPC · JPL
(326112) 2011 QB_{76}	7 September 2000	Spacewatch	Kitt Peak	5.146	0.053	17.0	4.873	5.419	11 km	–	catalog · MPC · JPL
(328883) 2010 HG	16 April 2010	WISE	WISE	5.244	0.141	10.9	4.506	5.982	16 km	–	catalog · MPC · JPL
(329580) 2002 WW_{22}	24 November 2002	NEAT	Palomar	5.194	0.054	24.2	4.913	5.475	12 km	–	catalog · MPC · JPL
(333412) 2002 WE_{29}	16 November 2002	NEAT	Palomar	5.152	0.114	8.7	4.566	5.738	10 km	–	catalog · MPC · JPL
(334221) 2001 TU_{24}	14 October 2001	LINEAR	Socorro	5.234	0.098	7.2	4.721	5.747	13 km	–	catalog · MPC · JPL
(334257) 2001 TA_{230}	15 October 2001	Spacewatch	Kitt Peak	5.196	0.062	13.9	4.874	5.518	9.9 km	–	catalog · MPC · JPL
(334260) 2001 TJ_{254}	14 October 2001	Sloan Digital Sky Survey	Apache Point	5.169	0.118	7.8	4.558	5.779	10 km	–	catalog · MPC · JPL
(334313) 2001 VM_{128}	11 November 2001	Sloan Digital Sky Survey	Apache Point	5.203	0.043	10.1	4.980	5.426	8.0 km	–	catalog · MPC · JPL
(334315) 2001 VF_{134}	12 November 2001	Sloan Digital Sky Survey	Apache Point	5.152	0.067	11.8	4.808	5.495	9.9 km	–	catalog · MPC · JPL
(334319) 2001 WU_{57}	19 November 2001	LINEAR	Socorro	5.228	0.073	8.5	4.845	5.611	13 km	–	catalog · MPC · JPL
(335178) 2005 AX_{64}	13 January 2005	Spacewatch	Kitt Peak	5.210	0.043	2.4	4.988	5.432	9.4 km	–	catalog · MPC · JPL
(335184) 2005 BM_{49}	16 January 2005	Spacewatch	Kitt Peak	5.275	0.062	9.8	4.945	5.604	11 km	–	catalog · MPC · JPL
(335186) 2005 CF_{14}	2 February 2005	Spacewatch	Kitt Peak	5.200	0.033	36.7	5.029	5.370	15 km	–	catalog · MPC · JPL
(335490) 2005 XG_{5}	6 December 2005	Spacewatch	Kitt Peak	5.220	0.032	32.8	5.055	5.386	13 km	–	catalog · MPC · JPL
(335509) 2005 YB_{143}	28 December 2005	MLS	Mount Lemmon	5.143	0.079	17.7	4.734	5.551	12 km	–	catalog · MPC · JPL
(335537) 2006 AE_{105}	5 January 2006	MLS	Mount Lemmon	5.221	0.023	5.5	5.103	5.338	12 km	–	catalog · MPC · JPL
(335557) 2006 BQ_{193}	30 January 2006	Spacewatch	Kitt Peak	5.080	0.058	2.5	4.784	5.376	7.8 km	–	catalog · MPC · JPL
(335558) 2006 BC_{194}	30 January 2006	Spacewatch	Kitt Peak	5.218	0.066	12.5	4.873	5.562	8.9 km	–	catalog · MPC · JPL
(335561) 2006 BU_{249}	31 January 2006	MLS	Mount Lemmon	5.164	0.061	9.6	4.847	5.480	13 km	–	catalog · MPC · JPL
(335567) 2006 CK_{5}	1 February 2006	Spacewatch	Kitt Peak	5.250	0.075	27.1	4.856	5.644	17 km	–	catalog · MPC · JPL
(335574) 2006 CJ_{51}	4 February 2006	Spacewatch	Kitt Peak	5.142	0.048	7.8	4.893	5.390	11 km	–	catalog · MPC · JPL
(335730) 2007 DL_{36}	17 February 2007	Spacewatch	Kitt Peak	5.226	0.059	6.8	4.920	5.532	10 km	–	catalog · MPC · JPL
(335739) 2007 DD_{116}	27 February 2007	Spacewatch	Kitt Peak	5.159	0.045	1.5	4.929	5.390	9.1 km	–	catalog · MPC · JPL
(335766) 2007 EC_{141}	12 March 2007	Spacewatch	Kitt Peak	5.266	0.095	22.0	4.768	5.765	9.2 km	–	catalog · MPC · JPL
(335767) 2007 EV_{145}	12 March 2007	MLS	Mount Lemmon	5.225	0.058	3.4	4.924	5.527	8.9 km	–	catalog · MPC · JPL
(335789) 2007 GN_{13}	11 April 2007	Spacewatch	Kitt Peak	5.214	0.050	13.6	4.952	5.475	7.9 km	–	catalog · MPC · JPL
(336068) 2008 FB_{27}	27 March 2008	Spacewatch	Kitt Peak	5.274	0.118	29.3	4.650	5.898	13 km	–	catalog · MPC · JPL
(336074) 2008 FU_{73}	26 September 2001	G. Hug	Eskridge	5.126	0.037	18.1	4.934	5.318	13 km	–	catalog · MPC · JPL
(336118) 2008 LT_{17}	29 March 2008	Spacewatch	Kitt Peak	5.194	0.052	12.9	4.926	5.463	8.8 km	–	catalog · MPC · JPL
(336555) 2009 JA_{2}	1 May 2009	Spacewatch	Kitt Peak	5.229	0.069	20.8	4.869	5.589	7.8 km	–	catalog · MPC · JPL
(336993) 2011 QQ_{3}	11 April 2008	MLS	Mount Lemmon	5.224	0.089	8.8	4.761	5.687	9.5 km	–	catalog · MPC · JPL
(337018) 1995 FU_{1}	23 March 1995	Spacewatch	Kitt Peak	5.142	0.038	15.9	4.948	5.336	9.0 km	–	catalog · MPC · JPL
(337019) 1995 FW_{8}	26 March 1995	Spacewatch	Kitt Peak	5.248	0.080	10.3	4.827	5.669	11 km	–	catalog · MPC · JPL
(337420) 2001 QX_{333}	25 August 2001	LINEAR	Socorro	5.225	0.061	26.6	4.908	5.542	16 km	–	catalog · MPC · JPL
(337638) 2001 TL_{111}	14 October 2001	LINEAR	Socorro	5.185	0.139	24.2	4.466	5.904	15 km	–	catalog · MPC · JPL
(337761) 2001 UB_{130}	21 September 2001	LINEAR	Socorro	5.156	0.124	8.3	4.518	5.794	9.5 km	–	catalog · MPC · JPL
(337775) 2001 UK_{166}	20 October 2001	Spacewatch	Kitt Peak	5.175	0.074	6.3	4.792	5.559	9.0 km	–	catalog · MPC · JPL
(337788) 2001 UE_{198}	19 October 2001	NEAT	Palomar	5.123	0.078	23.7	4.725	5.521	12 km	–	catalog · MPC · JPL
(337804) 2001 UN_{216}	24 October 2001	LINEAR	Socorro	5.215	0.032	24.6	5.049	5.382	15 km	–	catalog · MPC · JPL
(337832) 2001 VH_{57}	19 September 2001	LINEAR	Socorro	5.222	0.065	30.9	4.881	5.563	13 km	–	catalog · MPC · JPL
(337860) 2001 VY_{128}	11 November 2001	Sloan Digital Sky Survey	Apache Point	5.138	0.078	26.6	4.737	5.539	16 km	–	catalog · MPC · JPL
(337863) 2001 VJ_{132}	12 November 2001	Sloan Digital Sky Survey	Apache Point	5.260	0.113	12.6	4.667	5.853	8.9 km	–	catalog · MPC · JPL
(337874) 2001 WP_{51}	19 November 2001	LINEAR	Socorro	5.267	0.020	24.9	5.159	5.375	13 km	–	catalog · MPC · JPL
(337876) 2001 WB_{53}	19 November 2001	LINEAR	Socorro	5.177	0.074	24.3	4.795	5.559	9.5 km	–	catalog · MPC · JPL
(337880) 2001 WG_{70}	20 November 2001	LINEAR	Socorro	5.194	0.094	24.8	4.706	5.682	15 km	–	catalog · MPC · JPL
(338333) 2002 VQ_{141}	13 November 2002	NEAT	Palomar	5.177	0.095	23.4	4.687	5.668	13 km	–	catalog · MPC · JPL
(338343) 2002 WY_{19}	24 November 2002	S. F. Hönig	Palomar	5.207	0.021	23.3	5.098	5.317	13 km	–	catalog · MPC · JPL
(338345) 2002 WM_{24}	16 November 2002	NEAT	Palomar	5.166	0.102	22.6	4.639	5.693	10 km	–	catalog · MPC · JPL
(338372) 2002 XM_{120}	3 December 2002	NEAT	Palomar	5.151	0.088	10.8	4.697	5.604	12 km	–	catalog · MPC · JPL
(338858) 2003 YP_{40}	19 December 2003	Spacewatch	Kitt Peak	5.252	0.035	26.0	5.066	5.437	14 km	–	catalog · MPC · JPL
(338886) 2004 BY_{140}	19 January 2004	Spacewatch	Kitt Peak	5.354	0.060	2.9	5.033	5.674	9.9 km	–	catalog · MPC · JPL
(339369) 2005 AD_{51}	13 January 2005	Spacewatch	Kitt Peak	5.253	0.067	10.3	4.901	5.605	12 km	–	catalog · MPC · JPL
(339380) 2005 AR_{76}	15 January 2005	Spacewatch	Kitt Peak	5.199	0.025	6.1	5.071	5.328	8.1 km	–	catalog · MPC · JPL
(339382) 2005 AW_{78}	15 January 2005	Spacewatch	Kitt Peak	5.168	0.068	9.2	4.814	5.522	9.8 km	–	catalog · MPC · JPL
(340236) 2006 BE_{85}	25 January 2006	Spacewatch	Kitt Peak	5.199	0.123	3.5	4.561	5.837	10 km	–	catalog · MPC · JPL
(340262) 2006 BH_{156}	25 January 2006	Spacewatch	Kitt Peak	5.210	0.063	14.3	4.883	5.537	14 km	–	catalog · MPC · JPL
(340288) 2006 BD_{279}	31 January 2006	Spacewatch	Kitt Peak	5.238	0.091	1.7	4.762	5.715	9.0 km	–	catalog · MPC · JPL
(340289) 2006 BB_{280}	23 January 2006	Spacewatch	Kitt Peak	5.141	0.107	12.1	4.590	5.691	9.1 km	–	catalog · MPC · JPL
(340306) 2006 CD_{69}	4 February 2006	Spacewatch	Kitt Peak	5.244	0.063	16.5	4.915	5.574	9.6 km	–	catalog · MPC · JPL
(340322) 2006 DM_{28}	20 February 2006	Spacewatch	Kitt Peak	5.257	0.074	22.6	4.868	5.647	12 km	–	catalog · MPC · JPL
(340323) 2006 DO_{31}	20 February 2006	MLS	Mount Lemmon	5.270	0.054	19.2	4.988	5.553	10 km	–	catalog · MPC · JPL
(340327) 2006 DN_{36}	20 February 2006	MLS	Mount Lemmon	5.290	0.042	27.9	5.067	5.512	11 km	–	catalog · MPC · JPL
(340335) 2006 DZ_{44}	20 February 2006	Spacewatch	Kitt Peak	5.153	0.016	5.5	5.068	5.237	7.8 km	–	catalog · MPC · JPL
(340342) 2006 DD_{56}	24 February 2006	MLS	Mount Lemmon	5.215	0.079	13.7	4.805	5.625	13 km	–	catalog · MPC · JPL
(340348) 2006 DS_{70}	21 February 2006	MLS	Mount Lemmon	5.222	0.088	15.0	4.764	5.681	12 km	–	catalog · MPC · JPL
(340350) 2006 DX_{75}	24 February 2006	Spacewatch	Kitt Peak	5.246	0.087	4.3	4.789	5.704	8.9 km	–	catalog · MPC · JPL
(340360) 2006 DF_{98}	25 February 2006	Spacewatch	Kitt Peak	5.213	0.036	18.4	5.025	5.401	15 km	–	catalog · MPC · JPL
(340396) 2006 EU_{29}	3 March 2006	Spacewatch	Kitt Peak	5.259	0.085	26.6	4.814	5.704	11 km	–	catalog · MPC · JPL
(340912) 2007 DX_{53}	19 February 2007	MLS	Mount Lemmon	5.193	0.063	24.2	4.865	5.520	13 km	–	catalog · MPC · JPL
(340925) 2007 DG_{115}	23 February 2007	Spacewatch	Kitt Peak	5.254	0.083	25.0	4.820	5.689	9.9 km	–	catalog · MPC · JPL
(340943) 2007 EC_{45}	9 March 2007	Spacewatch	Kitt Peak	5.224	0.027	19.6	5.081	5.367	13 km	–	catalog · MPC · JPL
(340948) 2007 ES_{66}	10 March 2007	Spacewatch	Kitt Peak	5.195	0.080	11.9	4.781	5.609	13 km	–	catalog · MPC · JPL
(340951) 2007 ER_{71}	10 March 2007	Spacewatch	Kitt Peak	5.241	0.059	3.9	4.931	5.552	11 km	–	catalog · MPC · JPL
(340953) 2007 EU_{77}	10 March 2007	MLS	Mount Lemmon	5.218	0.080	24.5	4.800	5.637	9.0 km	–	catalog · MPC · JPL
(340966) 2007 EG_{106}	11 March 2007	Spacewatch	Kitt Peak	5.196	0.070	5.4	4.833	5.560	9.5 km	–	catalog · MPC · JPL
(340992) 2007 EJ_{198}	15 March 2007	MLS	Mount Lemmon	5.354	0.026	6.5	5.217	5.491	12 km	–	catalog · MPC · JPL
(341004) 2007 FB_{23}	20 March 2007	Spacewatch	Kitt Peak	5.164	0.059	12.6	4.857	5.471	11 km	–	catalog · MPC · JPL
(341008) 2007 FH_{30}	20 March 2007	MLS	Mount Lemmon	5.211	0.061	6.7	4.894	5.528	8.7 km	–	catalog · MPC · JPL
(341015) 2007 FG_{44}	16 March 2007	MLS	Mount Lemmon	5.260	0.051	4.1	4.993	5.527	8.5 km	–	catalog · MPC · JPL
(341017) 2007 FZ_{48}	26 March 2007	MLS	Mount Lemmon	5.299	0.110	8.7	4.716	5.883	12 km	–	catalog · MPC · JPL
(341021) 2007 GS_{6}	7 April 2007	MLS	Mount Lemmon	5.163	0.075	5.1	4.778	5.548	8.9 km	–	catalog · MPC · JPL
(341023) 2007 GX_{6}	7 April 2007	MLS	Mount Lemmon	5.256	0.066	11.7	4.910	5.602	9.9 km	–	catalog · MPC · JPL
(341025) 2007 GZ_{10}	11 April 2007	Spacewatch	Kitt Peak	5.172	0.030	17.5	5.017	5.326	9.9 km	–	catalog · MPC · JPL
(341026) 2007 GK_{15}	11 April 2007	MLS	Mount Lemmon	5.225	0.116	23.5	4.617	5.832	8.7 km	–	catalog · MPC · JPL
(341052) 2007 HW_{1}	16 April 2007	MLS	Mount Lemmon	5.358	0.048	5.1	5.103	5.613	8.6 km	–	catalog · MPC · JPL
(341845) 2008 EQ_{39}	4 March 2008	Spacewatch	Kitt Peak	5.162	0.211	4.6	4.072	6.252	10 km	–	catalog · MPC · JPL
(341854) 2008 FO_{63}	27 March 2008	Spacewatch	Kitt Peak	5.162	0.232	10.1	3.967	6.358	11 km	–	catalog · MPC · JPL
(341856) 2008 FN_{94}	29 March 2008	Spacewatch	Kitt Peak	5.181	0.059	8.0	4.875	5.488	8.5 km	–	catalog · MPC · JPL
(341857) 2008 FV_{100}	30 March 2008	Spacewatch	Kitt Peak	5.171	0.069	8.5	4.814	5.528	9.3 km	–	catalog · MPC · JPL
(341861) 2008 FA_{118}	31 March 2008	Spacewatch	Kitt Peak	5.220	0.110	21.1	4.647	5.794	11 km	–	catalog · MPC · JPL
(341863) 2008 FB_{126}	29 March 2008	Spacewatch	Kitt Peak	5.240	0.075	18.0	4.849	5.631	11 km	–	catalog · MPC · JPL
(341865) 2008 FA_{132}	29 March 2008	Spacewatch	Kitt Peak	5.153	0.092	5.3	4.681	5.626	9.7 km	–	catalog · MPC · JPL
(341867) 2008 FL_{134}	29 March 2008	Spacewatch	Kitt Peak	5.206	0.081	24.1	4.784	5.627	9.3 km	–	catalog · MPC · JPL
(341869) 2008 GW_{6}	1 April 2008	Spacewatch	Kitt Peak	5.177	0.131	9.6	4.500	5.854	13 km	–	catalog · MPC · JPL
(341870) 2008 GS_{31}	3 April 2008	Spacewatch	Kitt Peak	5.134	0.089	22.4	4.677	5.591	15 km	–	catalog · MPC · JPL
(341872) 2008 GW_{44}	4 April 2008	Spacewatch	Kitt Peak	5.236	0.125	23.2	4.580	5.892	9.4 km	–	catalog · MPC · JPL
(341875) 2008 GX_{56}	5 April 2008	MLS	Mount Lemmon	5.187	0.104	6.4	4.648	5.725	9.6 km	–	catalog · MPC · JPL
(341877) 2008 GA_{78}	7 April 2008	Spacewatch	Kitt Peak	5.237	0.124	6.8	4.589	5.884	9.5 km	–	catalog · MPC · JPL
(341880) 2008 GT_{87}	5 April 2008	MLS	Mount Lemmon	5.163	0.138	35.8	4.448	5.878	16 km	–	catalog · MPC · JPL
(341881) 2008 GM_{94}	7 April 2008	Spacewatch	Kitt Peak	5.160	0.048	6.9	4.912	5.408	9.5 km	–	catalog · MPC · JPL
(341886) 2008 GG_{132}	10 April 2008	Spacewatch	Kitt Peak	5.295	0.074	6.8	4.902	5.688	9.5 km	–	catalog · MPC · JPL
(341888) 2008 GT_{143}	14 April 2008	MLS	Mount Lemmon	5.338	0.030	13.2	5.177	5.499	8.2 km	–	catalog · MPC · JPL
(341891) 2008 HK_{18}	31 March 2008	MLS	Mount Lemmon	5.188	0.092	10.5	4.709	5.667	9.2 km	–	catalog · MPC · JPL
(341892) 2008 HM_{20}	26 April 2008	MLS	Mount Lemmon	5.118	0.012	12.6	5.056	5.180	9.7 km	–	catalog · MPC · JPL
(341894) 2008 HR_{21}	26 April 2008	MLS	Mount Lemmon	5.220	0.095	12.2	4.722	5.718	13 km	–	catalog · MPC · JPL
(341897) 2008 HJ_{43}	27 April 2008	MLS	Mount Lemmon	5.183	0.061	3.6	4.869	5.496	7.6 km	–	catalog · MPC · JPL
(341900) 2008 HE_{54}	29 April 2008	Spacewatch	Kitt Peak	5.177	0.046	13.7	4.940	5.414	10 km	–	catalog · MPC · JPL
(341909) 2008 JU_{16}	3 May 2008	MLS	Mount Lemmon	5.232	0.009	9.6	5.186	5.277	8.6 km	–	catalog · MPC · JPL
(341917) 2008 KV_{8}	27 May 2008	Spacewatch	Kitt Peak	5.259	0.073	11.1	4.877	5.641	8.3 km	–	catalog · MPC · JPL
(341919) 2008 KD_{18}	28 May 2008	Spacewatch	Kitt Peak	5.323	0.054	23.2	5.033	5.613	12 km	–	catalog · MPC · JPL
(341922) 2008 KH_{35}	27 May 2008	Spacewatch	Kitt Peak	5.332	0.081	7.7	4.901	5.764	8.7 km	–	catalog · MPC · JPL
(341923) 2008 KZ_{37}	30 May 2008	Spacewatch	Kitt Peak	5.183	0.063	28.3	4.857	5.510	11 km	–	catalog · MPC · JPL
(341925) 2008 KD_{43}	27 May 2008	Spacewatch	Kitt Peak	5.317	0.039	10.7	5.107	5.526	12 km	–	catalog · MPC · JPL
(341926) 2008 LW	1 April 2008	Spacewatch	Kitt Peak	5.251	0.115	10.9	4.646	5.856	7.3 km	–	catalog · MPC · JPL
(341928) 2008 LZ_{5}	3 June 2008	Spacewatch	Kitt Peak	5.191	0.114	28.4	4.600	5.782	18 km	–	catalog · MPC · JPL
(343159) 2009 JD_{17}	13 May 2009	Spacewatch	Kitt Peak	5.238	0.074	17.4	4.850	5.627	14 km	–	catalog · MPC · JPL
(343161) 2009 KH_{3}	22 May 2009	P. Kocher	Marly	5.232	0.192	26.2	4.229	6.234	11 km	–	catalog · MPC · JPL
(343586) 2010 GM_{9}	17 February 2007	Spacewatch	Kitt Peak	5.108	0.071	15.5	4.746	5.470	13 km	–	catalog · MPC · JPL
(343627) 2010 HY_{31}	20 April 2010	WISE	WISE	5.169	0.127	14.2	4.514	5.824	14 km	–	catalog · MPC · JPL
(343628) 2010 HC_{41}	22 April 2010	WISE	WISE	5.249	0.116	12.5	4.640	5.857	11 km	–	catalog · MPC · JPL
(343634) 2010 HV_{110}	29 April 2008	MLS	Mount Lemmon	5.128	0.103	19.4	4.597	5.659	16 km	–	catalog · MPC · JPL
(343642) 2010 JC_{42}	7 May 2010	WISE	WISE	5.239	0.066	21.5	4.890	5.587	14 km	–	catalog · MPC · JPL
(343644) 2010 JX_{69}	18 December 2004	MLS	Mount Lemmon	5.185	0.106	13.0	4.635	5.735	13 km	–	catalog · MPC · JPL
(343663) 2010 NL_{5}	21 October 2001	Spacewatch	Kitt Peak	5.269	0.065	15.1	4.925	5.614	10 km	–	catalog · MPC · JPL
(343896) 2011 JK_{8}	6 May 2011	MLS	Mount Lemmon	5.186	0.128	11.7	4.520	5.852	10 km	–	catalog · MPC · JPL
(343975) 2011 LC_{20}	2 May 2010	WISE	WISE	5.251	0.138	3.5	4.524	5.977	11 km	–	catalog · MPC · JPL
(343976) 2011 LC_{21}	30 January 2006	Spacewatch	Kitt Peak	5.184	0.121	6.4	4.558	5.810	10 km	–	catalog · MPC · JPL
(343977) 2011 LG_{21}	22 December 2003	Spacewatch	Kitt Peak	5.250	0.078	7.7	4.841	5.658	9.6 km	–	catalog · MPC · JPL
(343993) 2011 PW_{8}	22 April 2010	WISE	WISE	5.231	0.203	19.5	4.169	6.293	12 km	–	catalog · MPC · JPL
(343994) 2011 PT_{14}	24 September 2000	LINEAR	Socorro	5.240	0.075	3.6	4.846	5.634	12 km	–	catalog · MPC · JPL
(343995) 2011 QG_{3}	30 March 2008	Spacewatch	Kitt Peak	5.160	0.059	12.7	4.855	5.466	8.5 km	–	catalog · MPC · JPL
(343996) 2011 QK_{3}	2 July 2011	Spacewatch	Kitt Peak	5.224	0.049	12.1	4.971	5.478	12 km	–	catalog · MPC · JPL
(343999) 2011 QJ_{9}	2 March 2006	Spacewatch	Kitt Peak	5.349	0.042	1.7	5.122	5.575	9.6 km	–	catalog · MPC · JPL
(344001) 2011 QD_{46}	11 November 2001	Spacewatch	Kitt Peak	5.317	0.035	8.0	5.130	5.504	10 km	–	catalog · MPC · JPL
(344002) 2011 QN_{47}	23 September 2000	LINEAR	Socorro	5.163	0.133	10.5	4.474	5.852	13 km	–	catalog · MPC · JPL
(344003) 2011 QW_{53}	9 June 2011	Pan-STARRS 1	Haleakala	5.265	0.062	9.3	4.936	5.593	10 km	–	catalog · MPC · JPL
(344004) 2011 QV_{73}	21 December 2003	Spacewatch	Kitt Peak	5.264	0.050	6.6	5.002	5.525	11 km	–	catalog · MPC · JPL
(344005) 2011 QZ_{75}	26 January 2006	Spacewatch	Kitt Peak	5.239	0.064	7.3	4.905	5.574	8.4 km	–	catalog · MPC · JPL
(344006) 2011 QD_{77}	19 June 2010	MLS	Mount Lemmon	5.208	0.159	3.7	4.380	6.035	7.3 km	–	catalog · MPC · JPL
(344340) 2001 VG_{132}	12 November 2001	Sloan Digital Sky Survey	Apache Point	5.237	0.012	11.1	5.177	5.298	9.2 km	–	catalog · MPC · JPL
(344556) 2002 WF_{25}	25 November 2002	NEAT	Palomar	5.143	0.051	4.9	4.879	5.406	8.0 km	–	catalog · MPC · JPL
(344800) 2003 YE_{179}	22 December 2003	Spacewatch	Kitt Peak	5.333	0.038	10.5	5.130	5.535	11 km	–	catalog · MPC · JPL
(345407) 2006 BR_{260}	31 January 2006	Spacewatch	Kitt Peak	5.198	0.078	28.3	4.792	5.603	12 km	–	catalog · MPC · JPL
(345434) 2006 DP_{105}	25 February 2006	MLS	Mount Lemmon	5.249	0.053	4.2	4.970	5.528	8.0 km	–	catalog · MPC · JPL
(345753) 2007 EZ_{55}	12 March 2007	MLS	Mount Lemmon	5.185	0.152	12.8	4.398	5.972	9.1 km	–	catalog · MPC · JPL
(345775) 2007 EN_{133}	9 March 2007	MLS	Mount Lemmon	5.124	0.083	8.6	4.701	5.547	10 km	–	catalog · MPC · JPL
(346245) 2008 CY_{115}	10 February 2008	MLS	Mount Lemmon	5.139	0.113	30.1	4.560	5.718	10 km	–	catalog · MPC · JPL
(346255) 2008 EN_{29}	4 March 2008	MLS	Mount Lemmon	5.265	0.148	26.0	4.484	6.045	13 km	–	catalog · MPC · JPL
(346264) 2008 FK_{100}	30 March 2008	Spacewatch	Kitt Peak	5.245	0.121	7.1	4.607	5.882	9.3 km	–	catalog · MPC · JPL
(346267) 2008 FA_{131}	28 March 2008	Spacewatch	Kitt Peak	5.159	0.064	12.2	4.827	5.491	13 km	–	catalog · MPC · JPL
(346268) 2008 FB_{134}	28 March 2008	Spacewatch	Kitt Peak	5.162	0.098	20.4	4.654	5.670	9.3 km	–	catalog · MPC · JPL
(346274) 2008 GS_{99}	28 March 2008	MLS	Mount Lemmon	5.225	0.144	13.8	4.471	5.980	7.4 km	–	catalog · MPC · JPL
(346278) 2008 GR_{141}	19 March 2007	MLS	Mount Lemmon	5.231	0.087	14.5	4.774	5.688	11 km	–	catalog · MPC · JPL
(346883) 2009 JH_{4}	1 May 2009	Cerro Burek	Cerro Burek	5.110	0.054	16.4	4.834	5.387	11 km	–	catalog · MPC · JPL
(346885) 2009 JN_{17}	14 May 2009	MLS	Mount Lemmon	5.199	0.145	22.5	4.444	5.953	14 km	–	catalog · MPC · JPL
(347098) 2010 HO_{17}	9 February 2007	Spacewatch	Kitt Peak	5.211	0.134	15.2	4.512	5.909	12 km	–	catalog · MPC · JPL
(347099) 2010 HO_{21}	22 April 2010	WISE	WISE	5.217	0.042	23.7	4.998	5.436	12 km	–	catalog · MPC · JPL
(347134) 2010 MC_{113}	2 February 2006	MLS	Mount Lemmon	5.167	0.069	24.6	4.808	5.525	10 km	–	catalog · MPC · JPL
(347296) 2011 OT_{5}	16 January 2005	Spacewatch	Kitt Peak	5.249	0.004	17.6	5.228	5.270	11 km	–	catalog · MPC · JPL
(347299) 2011 OA_{28}	1 June 2011	ESA OGS	ESA OGS	5.215	0.066	13.0	4.872	5.557	11 km	–	catalog · MPC · JPL
(347313) 2011 QB_{46}	1 February 2006	MLS	Mount Lemmon	5.171	0.093	3.2	4.692	5.650	8.5 km	–	catalog · MPC · JPL
(347314) 2011 QE_{46}	5 April 2008	Spacewatch	Kitt Peak	5.244	0.095	8.3	4.743	5.744	7.7 km	–	catalog · MPC · JPL
(347315) 2011 QK_{46}	11 November 2001	Sloan Digital Sky Survey	Apache Point	5.129	0.061	11.0	4.815	5.444	9.5 km	–	catalog · MPC · JPL
(347318) 2011 QV_{76}	4 March 2005	MLS	Mount Lemmon	5.231	0.048	9.2	4.980	5.482	8.4 km	–	catalog · MPC · JPL
(347330) 2011 SV_{266}	18 March 2007	Spacewatch	Kitt Peak	5.253	0.074	2.5	4.864	5.642	9.1 km	–	catalog · MPC · JPL
(347407) 2012 SF_{30}	31 January 2006	Spacewatch	Kitt Peak	5.173	0.074	6.8	4.791	5.556	9.3 km	–	catalog · MPC · JPL
(347446) 2012 TF_{231}	18 December 2004	MLS	Mount Lemmon	5.269	0.043	18.7	5.041	5.496	17 km	–	catalog · MPC · JPL
(347452) 2012 TL_{242}	9 April 2008	Spacewatch	Kitt Peak	5.192	0.152	4.0	4.402	5.982	7.7 km	–	catalog · MPC · JPL
(347455) 2012 TE_{258}	23 February 2007	Spacewatch	Kitt Peak	5.208	0.069	17.8	4.846	5.569	12 km	–	catalog · MPC · JPL
(348312) 2005 AR_{72}	15 January 2005	Spacewatch	Kitt Peak	5.295	0.019	25.6	5.194	5.396	15 km	–	catalog · MPC · JPL
(348704) 2006 BU_{274}	23 January 2006	Spacewatch	Kitt Peak	5.179	0.048	10.1	4.933	5.425	11 km	–	catalog · MPC · JPL
(349496) 2008 KZ_{34}	27 May 2008	Spacewatch	Kitt Peak	5.190	0.080	31.4	4.776	5.603	13 km	–	catalog · MPC · JPL
(350006) 2010 GR_{147}	15 April 2010	WISE	WISE	5.191	0.069	26.8	4.831	5.551	11 km	–	catalog · MPC · JPL
(350009) 2010 HX_{23}	26 April 2010	WISE	WISE	5.146	0.087	18.1	4.696	5.596	13 km	–	catalog · MPC · JPL
(350078) 2011 JX_{9}	2 April 2009	MLS	Mount Lemmon	5.229	0.078	20.2	4.820	5.637	12 km	–	catalog · MPC · JPL
(350109) 2011 PB_{15}	19 December 2003	Spacewatch	Kitt Peak	5.259	0.071	26.7	4.885	5.632	14 km	–	catalog · MPC · JPL
(350202) 2012 LL_{11}	13 October 2002	NEAT	Palomar	5.177	0.087	23.1	4.727	5.627	16 km	–	catalog · MPC · JPL
(350212) 2012 RD_{25}	24 October 2005	A. Boattini	Mauna Kea	5.153	0.075	2.1	4.765	5.540	9.5 km	–	catalog · MPC · JPL
(353796) 2012 RR_{6}	6 September 2012	MLS	Mount Lemmon	5.153	0.107	16.5	4.602	5.704	13 km	–	catalog · MPC · JPL
(353801) 2012 TR_{52}	5 October 2000	Spacewatch	Kitt Peak	5.281	0.016	17.9	5.198	5.365	8.9 km	–	catalog · MPC · JPL
(356934) 2012 TB_{15}	19 March 2007	MLS	Mount Lemmon	5.246	0.080	29.2	4.825	5.666	14 km	–	catalog · MPC · JPL
(359616) 2011 JA_{11}	8 May 2011	MLS	Mount Lemmon	5.157	0.104	20.2	4.623	5.691	12 km	–	catalog · MPC · JPL
(368086) 2012 TE_{297}	26 October 2001	Spacewatch	Kitt Peak	5.140	0.030	27.1	4.988	5.292	13 km	–	catalog · MPC · JPL
(369881) 2012 MF_{6}	15 November 2003	Spacewatch	Kitt Peak	5.165	0.042	27.1	4.948	5.382	12 km	–	catalog · MPC · JPL
(369886) 2012 RM_{6}	28 February 2005	CSS	Catalina	5.220	0.068	26.0	4.868	5.573	14 km	–	catalog · MPC · JPL
(369977) 1997 JC_{11}	9 May 1997	Spacewatch	Kitt Peak	5.215	0.028	32.1	5.069	5.362	14 km	–	catalog · MPC · JPL
(370087) 2001 SG_{221}	19 September 2001	LINEAR	Socorro	5.232	0.202	6.6	4.173	6.290	9.0 km	–	catalog · MPC · JPL
(370105) 2001 TA_{132}	11 October 2001	NEAT	Palomar	5.163	0.032	20.0	4.997	5.329	15 km	–	catalog · MPC · JPL
(371203) 2005 YS_{289}	28 December 2005	MLS	Mount Lemmon	5.243	0.058	7.5	4.940	5.547	9.0 km	–	catalog · MPC · JPL
(371254) 2006 BL_{173}	27 January 2006	Spacewatch	Kitt Peak	5.058	0.048	2.2	4.816	5.301	7.8 km	–	catalog · MPC · JPL
(371682) 2007 DE_{30}	17 February 2007	Spacewatch	Kitt Peak	5.159	0.055	11.3	4.875	5.442	10 km	–	catalog · MPC · JPL
(371743) 2007 EL_{192}	14 March 2007	Spacewatch	Kitt Peak	5.198	0.061	6.7	4.881	5.514	9.0 km	–	catalog · MPC · JPL
(371911) 2008 DB_{47}	28 February 2008	Spacewatch	Kitt Peak	5.203	0.098	13.0	4.692	5.714	13 km	–	catalog · MPC · JPL
(371918) 2008 DX_{81}	28 February 2008	Spacewatch	Kitt Peak	5.145	0.051	13.9	4.881	5.408	10 km	–	catalog · MPC · JPL
(373381) 2012 RT_{4}	30 March 2010	WISE	WISE	5.126	0.082	16.6	4.705	5.547	14 km	–	catalog · MPC · JPL
(373543) 2001 TH_{250}	14 October 2001	Sloan Digital Sky Survey	Apache Point	5.158	0.040	24.1	4.951	5.364	10 km	–	catalog · MPC · JPL
(373813) 2002 VP_{139}	5 November 2002	NEAT	Palomar	5.250	0.028	17.1	5.104	5.396	13 km	–	catalog · MPC · JPL
(373820) 2002 WG_{29}	22 November 2002	NEAT	Palomar	5.207	0.047	11.9	4.961	5.452	11 km	–	catalog · MPC · JPL
(373985) 2003 YL_{165}	17 December 2003	Spacewatch	Kitt Peak	5.140	0.055	12.6	4.855	5.425	12 km	–	catalog · MPC · JPL
(374183) 2004 XV_{159}	14 December 2004	Spacewatch	Kitt Peak	5.195	0.052	16.5	4.925	5.466	11 km	–	catalog · MPC · JPL
(374213) 2005 ER_{272}	2 March 2005	Spacewatch	Kitt Peak	5.233	0.077	3.1	4.831	5.636	9.4 km	–	catalog · MPC · JPL
(374564) 2006 BD_{226}	30 January 2006	Spacewatch	Kitt Peak	5.105	0.036	4.1	4.921	5.288	9.0 km	–	catalog · MPC · JPL
(374580) 2006 CJ_{52}	4 February 2006	Spacewatch	Kitt Peak	5.171	0.040	17.1	4.963	5.379	9.1 km	–	catalog · MPC · JPL
(374605) 2006 DK_{133}	1 February 2006	Spacewatch	Kitt Peak	5.196	0.037	18.4	5.003	5.388	9.2 km	–	catalog · MPC · JPL
(374613) 2006 DQ_{216}	21 February 2006	MLS	Mount Lemmon	5.208	0.075	33.8	4.815	5.601	12 km	–	catalog · MPC · JPL
(375211) 2008 EQ_{163}	12 March 2008	Spacewatch	Kitt Peak	5.170	0.052	32.3	4.903	5.438	12 km	–	catalog · MPC · JPL
(375231) 2008 FZ_{93}	29 March 2008	Spacewatch	Kitt Peak	5.177	0.044	17.0	4.950	5.405	9.6 km	–	catalog · MPC · JPL
(375237) 2008 FA_{136}	25 February 1995	Spacewatch	Kitt Peak	5.182	0.030	6.3	5.024	5.340	9.4 km	–	catalog · MPC · JPL
(375241) 2008 GM_{11}	1 April 2008	Spacewatch	Kitt Peak	5.202	0.010	28.2	5.149	5.254	15 km	–	catalog · MPC · JPL
(375244) 2008 GV_{36}	3 April 2008	Spacewatch	Kitt Peak	5.244	0.075	20.5	4.852	5.636	11 km	–	catalog · MPC · JPL
(375252) 2008 GH_{89}	6 April 2008	Spacewatch	Kitt Peak	5.133	0.010	14.6	5.079	5.186	12 km	–	catalog · MPC · JPL
(375253) 2008 GO_{91}	13 March 2007	MLS	Mount Lemmon	5.064	0.029	8.5	4.919	5.210	7.5 km	–	catalog · MPC · JPL
(375257) 2008 GW_{100}	9 April 2008	Spacewatch	Kitt Peak	5.263	0.115	13.6	4.657	5.869	12 km	–	catalog · MPC · JPL
(375259) 2008 GL_{115}	11 April 2008	Spacewatch	Kitt Peak	5.180	0.081	30.8	4.761	5.599	16 km	–	catalog · MPC · JPL
(375265) 2008 GJ_{141}	3 April 2008	MLS	Mount Lemmon	5.223	0.045	25.9	4.988	5.458	16 km	–	catalog · MPC · JPL
(375266) 2008 GV_{141}	15 April 2008	MLS	Mount Lemmon	5.253	0.047	12.7	5.005	5.500	9.9 km	–	catalog · MPC · JPL
(375669) 2009 FA_{32}	26 March 2009	Cerro Burek	Cerro Burek	5.287	0.077	26.0	4.880	5.694	12 km	–	catalog · MPC · JPL
(376067) 2010 HY_{30}	13 December 2004	Spacewatch	Kitt Peak	5.220	0.084	20.3	4.783	5.657	15 km	–	catalog · MPC · JPL
(376370) 2011 OX_{26}	10 January 2006	MLS	Mount Lemmon	5.200	0.083	8.8	4.768	5.632	10 km	–	catalog · MPC · JPL
(376371) 2011 OU_{44}	5 July 2011	Astronomical Research Observatory	Westfield	5.189	0.179	3.6	4.259	6.119	8.0 km	–	catalog · MPC · JPL
(376373) 2011 SV_{21}	19 December 2004	MLS	Mount Lemmon	5.195	0.112	5.0	4.615	5.774	11 km	–	catalog · MPC · JPL
(376488) 2012 KR_{8}	1 April 2008	Spacewatch	Kitt Peak	5.208	0.027	31.0	5.067	5.350	12 km	–	catalog · MPC · JPL
(376523) 2012 PK_{14}	30 January 2006	Spacewatch	Kitt Peak	5.078	0.038	3.1	4.885	5.271	9.0 km	–	catalog · MPC · JPL
(376526) 2012 QN_{16}	9 March 2005	MLS	Mount Lemmon	5.252	0.048	2.0	5.000	5.504	8.3 km	–	catalog · MPC · JPL
(376527) 2012 QX_{39}	17 January 2005	Spacewatch	Kitt Peak	5.170	0.101	5.9	4.650	5.690	8.6 km	–	catalog · MPC · JPL
(376528) 2012 QH_{40}	1 December 2003	Spacewatch	Kitt Peak	5.115	0.028	10.6	4.970	5.261	13 km	–	catalog · MPC · JPL
(376531) 2012 RA_{33}	4 February 2006	Spacewatch	Kitt Peak	5.207	0.112	19.5	4.626	5.788	11 km	–	catalog · MPC · JPL
(376532) 2012 SA_{24}	15 March 2007	Spacewatch	Kitt Peak	5.254	0.024	3.4	5.127	5.381	7.8 km	–	catalog · MPC · JPL
(376533) 2012 SF_{41}	30 August 2000	Spacewatch	Kitt Peak	5.177	0.054	7.8	4.896	5.458	9.6 km	–	catalog · MPC · JPL
(376534) 2012 SC_{59}	12 March 2008	MLS	Mount Lemmon	5.152	0.160	7.5	4.327	5.978	8.0 km	–	catalog · MPC · JPL
(376535) 2012 TL	11 March 2007	Spacewatch	Kitt Peak	5.219	0.087	24.3	4.764	5.675	14 km	–	catalog · MPC · JPL
(376536) 2012 TP	30 January 2006	Spacewatch	Kitt Peak	5.170	0.027	5.7	5.032	5.308	8.3 km	–	catalog · MPC · JPL
(376538) 2012 TO_{146}	15 March 2007	Spacewatch	Kitt Peak	5.295	0.094	23.7	4.795	5.794	11 km	–	catalog · MPC · JPL
(376539) 2012 TT_{146}	19 January 2005	Spacewatch	Kitt Peak	5.154	0.129	5.2	4.491	5.817	9.6 km	–	catalog · MPC · JPL
(376542) 2013 AA_{4}	11 April 2008	MLS	Mount Lemmon	5.222	0.077	23.5	4.820	5.623	12 km	–	catalog · MPC · JPL
(376867) 2001 TN_{222}	14 October 2001	LINEAR	Socorro	5.216	0.035	24.4	5.033	5.399	13 km	–	catalog · MPC · JPL
(376869) 2001 TQ_{260}	14 October 2001	Sloan Digital Sky Survey	Apache Point	5.167	0.007	5.7	5.129	5.206	9.9 km	–	catalog · MPC · JPL
(376873) 2001 UW_{230}	16 October 2001	NEAT	Palomar	5.198	0.106	28.2	4.646	5.749	9.7 km	–	catalog · MPC · JPL
(377094) 2002 WD_{1}	23 November 2002	NEAT	Palomar	5.090	0.105	28.9	4.557	5.623	12 km	–	catalog · MPC · JPL
(377110) 2002 WA_{30}	23 November 2002	NEAT	Palomar	5.178	0.061	13.6	4.864	5.492	9.9 km	–	catalog · MPC · JPL
(377222) 2003 YD_{117}	18 December 2003	Spacewatch	Kitt Peak	5.149	0.084	20.5	4.718	5.579	13 km	–	catalog · MPC · JPL
(377224) 2003 YL_{133}	28 December 2003	LINEAR	Socorro	5.256	0.075	30.2	4.861	5.650	14 km	–	catalog · MPC · JPL
(377250) 2004 BP_{129}	22 December 2003	Spacewatch	Kitt Peak	5.322	0.044	11.1	5.090	5.554	12 km	–	catalog · MPC · JPL
(377471) 2004 YG_{16}	18 December 2004	MLS	Mount Lemmon	5.121	0.070	12.4	4.761	5.481	11 km	–	catalog · MPC · JPL
(377475) 2005 AA_{79}	15 January 2005	Spacewatch	Kitt Peak	5.212	0.032	18.5	5.047	5.376	11 km	–	catalog · MPC · JPL
(377493) 2005 EK_{122}	8 March 2005	MLS	Mount Lemmon	5.371	0.023	6.1	5.246	5.495	8.5 km	–	catalog · MPC · JPL
(377844) 2006 BR_{169}	26 January 2006	MLS	Mount Lemmon	5.232	0.051	11.5	4.967	5.497	8.5 km	–	catalog · MPC · JPL
(377851) 2006 BQ_{199}	30 January 2006	Spacewatch	Kitt Peak	5.238	0.090	1.7	4.767	5.709	7.6 km	–	catalog · MPC · JPL
(377867) 2006 BE_{284}	31 January 2006	Spacewatch	Kitt Peak	5.215	0.053	8.2	4.937	5.494	7.5 km	–	catalog · MPC · JPL
(377903) 2006 DR_{118}	28 February 2006	MLS	Mount Lemmon	5.224	0.082	25.3	4.794	5.653	9.7 km	–	catalog · MPC · JPL
(378251) 2007 DN_{10}	17 February 2007	Spacewatch	Kitt Peak	5.139	0.070	27.0	4.780	5.498	8.7 km	–	catalog · MPC · JPL
(378273) 2007 EB_{51}	10 March 2007	Spacewatch	Kitt Peak	5.138	0.060	8.9	4.830	5.446	8.6 km	–	catalog · MPC · JPL
(378275) 2007 ET_{54}	22 February 2007	Spacewatch	Kitt Peak	5.114	0.089	2.1	4.660	5.569	8.9 km	–	catalog · MPC · JPL
(378304) 2007 EN_{217}	11 March 2007	MLS	Mount Lemmon	5.147	0.076	27.1	4.758	5.536	8.5 km	–	catalog · MPC · JPL
(378332) 2007 GY_{75}	11 April 2007	MLS	Mount Lemmon	5.211	0.093	4.4	4.729	5.693	7.5 km	–	catalog · MPC · JPL
(378355) 2007 KG_{2}	18 May 2007	Astronomical Research Observatory	Charleston	5.259	0.136	19.2	4.542	5.977	14 km	–	catalog · MPC · JPL
(378592) 2008 EK_{42}	4 March 2008	Spacewatch	Kitt Peak	5.160	0.032	27.2	4.994	5.327	13 km	–	catalog · MPC · JPL
(378617) 2008 FS_{66}	28 March 2008	Spacewatch	Kitt Peak	5.246	0.054	27.0	4.962	5.530	14 km	–	catalog · MPC · JPL
(378620) 2008 FY_{66}	28 March 2008	Spacewatch	Kitt Peak	5.222	0.074	23.8	4.836	5.609	11 km	–	catalog · MPC · JPL
(378640) 2008 FC_{133}	30 March 2008	Spacewatch	Kitt Peak	5.191	0.086	8.0	4.744	5.638	9.3 km	–	catalog · MPC · JPL
(378641) 2008 FX_{134}	30 March 2008	Spacewatch	Kitt Peak	5.262	0.147	8.4	4.488	6.036	9.0 km	–	catalog · MPC · JPL
(378648) 2008 GM_{35}	3 April 2008	Spacewatch	Kitt Peak	5.220	0.054	7.4	4.941	5.500	8.3 km	–	catalog · MPC · JPL
(378652) 2008 GR_{41}	19 September 2001	Spacewatch	Kitt Peak	5.132	0.064	18.9	4.806	5.458	7.9 km	–	catalog · MPC · JPL
(378654) 2008 GZ_{52}	5 April 2008	MLS	Mount Lemmon	5.134	0.126	15.5	4.486	5.782	10 km	–	catalog · MPC · JPL
(378665) 2008 GB_{116}	11 April 2008	Spacewatch	Kitt Peak	5.155	0.054	21.8	4.879	5.432	9.0 km	–	catalog · MPC · JPL
(378668) 2008 GN_{140}	7 April 2008	Spacewatch	Kitt Peak	5.285	0.034	6.2	5.107	5.463	7.7 km	–	catalog · MPC · JPL
(378672) 2008 HD_{13}	25 April 2008	Spacewatch	Kitt Peak	5.213	0.168	5.5	4.340	6.086	9.5 km	–	catalog · MPC · JPL
(378680) 2008 HX_{62}	28 April 2008	Spacewatch	Kitt Peak	5.176	0.059	12.1	4.868	5.483	11 km	–	catalog · MPC · JPL
(378681) 2008 HJ_{64}	29 April 2008	MLS	Mount Lemmon	5.242	0.024	16.5	5.118	5.366	8.5 km	–	catalog · MPC · JPL
(378686) 2008 JW_{26}	7 May 2008	Spacewatch	Kitt Peak	5.234	0.081	13.6	4.811	5.656	10 km	–	catalog · MPC · JPL
(378691) 2008 KU_{7}	27 May 2008	Spacewatch	Kitt Peak	5.272	0.045	13.8	5.036	5.508	10 km	–	catalog · MPC · JPL
(378694) 2008 KT_{28}	31 May 2008	Spacewatch	Kitt Peak	5.191	0.038	10.7	4.995	5.386	11 km	–	catalog · MPC · JPL
(379143) 2009 HU_{11}	19 April 2009	Spacewatch	Kitt Peak	5.184	0.139	22.9	4.464	5.904	14 km	–	catalog · MPC · JPL
(379511) 2010 HC_{1}	18 April 2010	WISE	WISE	5.218	0.084	10.9	4.780	5.655	10 km	–	catalog · MPC · JPL
(379835) 2011 PE_{3}	14 December 2004	Spacewatch	Kitt Peak	5.219	0.103	16.8	4.681	5.758	13 km	–	catalog · MPC · JPL
(379836) 2011 QF	16 April 2010	WISE	WISE	5.249	0.038	23.8	5.048	5.450	16 km	–	catalog · MPC · JPL
(379837) 2011 QP_{3}	9 April 2010	WISE	WISE	5.291	0.097	19.0	4.777	5.805	14 km	–	catalog · MPC · JPL
(379839) 2011 QQ_{42}	19 April 2010	WISE	WISE	5.273	0.108	10.1	4.704	5.842	8.3 km	–	catalog · MPC · JPL
(379840) 2011 SG_{69}	2 October 1999	Spacewatch	Kitt Peak	5.351	0.039	3.7	5.144	5.558	8.3 km	–	catalog · MPC · JPL
(379949) 2012 OM_{1}	25 January 2006	Spacewatch	Kitt Peak	5.152	0.079	20.4	4.744	5.559	12 km	–	catalog · MPC · JPL
(379964) 2012 QH_{30}	15 December 2004	Spacewatch	Kitt Peak	5.090	0.042	11.9	4.873	5.306	12 km	–	catalog · MPC · JPL
(379965) 2012 QV_{34}	14 April 2008	MLS	Mount Lemmon	5.151	0.042	9.2	4.934	5.368	11 km	–	catalog · MPC · JPL
(379972) 2012 SA_{1}	8 October 1999	LINEAR	Socorro	5.277	0.150	15.9	4.488	6.066	13 km	–	catalog · MPC · JPL
(379973) 2012 SQ_{21}	26 March 1995	Spacewatch	Kitt Peak	5.220	0.016	5.4	5.136	5.304	12 km	–	catalog · MPC · JPL
(379974) 2012 SH_{28}	26 February 2007	MLS	Mount Lemmon	5.160	0.053	27.8	4.887	5.432	9.7 km	–	catalog · MPC · JPL
(379975) 2012 TJ_{7}	18 September 2001	Spacewatch	Kitt Peak	5.134	0.064	2.8	4.805	5.464	7.7 km	–	catalog · MPC · JPL
(379976) 2012 TP_{7}	16 December 2003	Spacewatch	Kitt Peak	5.274	0.075	8.8	4.877	5.672	12 km	–	catalog · MPC · JPL
(379977) 2012 TN_{15}	24 September 2000	LINEAR	Socorro	5.208	0.118	21.1	4.593	5.822	15 km	–	catalog · MPC · JPL
(379978) 2012 TH_{52}	4 February 2005	Spacewatch	Kitt Peak	5.289	0.054	3.4	5.003	5.575	8.7 km	–	catalog · MPC · JPL
(379979) 2012 TM_{52}	20 February 2006	MLS	Mount Lemmon	5.260	0.016	13.3	5.176	5.345	12 km	–	catalog · MPC · JPL
(379980) 2012 TF_{78}	13 April 1996	Spacewatch	Kitt Peak	5.152	0.079	18.7	4.745	5.559	11 km	–	catalog · MPC · JPL
(379983) 2012 TJ_{144}	22 April 2010	WISE	WISE	5.215	0.136	11.8	4.504	5.925	7.5 km	–	catalog · MPC · JPL
(379984) 2012 TQ_{145}	14 March 2007	MLS	Mount Lemmon	5.257	0.029	2.1	5.102	5.412	8.2 km	–	catalog · MPC · JPL
(379985) 2012 TM_{191}	26 January 2006	MLS	Mount Lemmon	5.194	0.137	8.1	4.484	5.905	8.5 km	–	catalog · MPC · JPL
(379986) 2012 TM_{241}	12 March 2008	Spacewatch	Kitt Peak	5.184	0.186	8.6	4.220	6.148	7.7 km	–	catalog · MPC · JPL
(380893) 2006 DB_{89}	24 February 2006	Spacewatch	Kitt Peak	5.321	0.026	7.2	5.184	5.458	9.3 km	–	catalog · MPC · JPL
(381144) 2007 EU_{219}	11 March 2007	MLS	Mount Lemmon	5.321	0.064	27.9	4.979	5.662	10 km	–	catalog · MPC · JPL
(381148) 2007 GZ_{1}	8 April 2007	R. Gierlinger	Gaisberg	5.200	0.039	15.5	4.996	5.404	12 km	–	catalog · MPC · JPL
(381384) 2008 FH_{135}	31 March 2008	Spacewatch	Kitt Peak	5.181	0.052	9.6	4.913	5.448	8.0 km	–	catalog · MPC · JPL
(381409) 2008 HM_{47}	13 April 2008	MLS	Mount Lemmon	5.273	0.104	19.4	4.723	5.823	14 km	–	catalog · MPC · JPL
(381415) 2008 KY_{7}	27 May 2008	Spacewatch	Kitt Peak	5.190	0.060	4.4	4.880	5.500	7.7 km	–	catalog · MPC · JPL
(381417) 2008 KJ_{11}	29 May 2008	MLS	Mount Lemmon	5.179	0.001	13.0	5.175	5.183	10 km	–	catalog · MPC · JPL
(381419) 2008 KE_{43}	29 May 2008	Spacewatch	Kitt Peak	5.285	0.038	17.3	5.083	5.487	12 km	–	catalog · MPC · JPL
(381420) 2008 LS_{2}	1 June 2008	Spacewatch	Kitt Peak	5.235	0.095	9.6	4.737	5.734	11 km	–	catalog · MPC · JPL
(381422) 2008 LN_{13}	7 June 2008	Spacewatch	Kitt Peak	5.189	0.064	14.6	4.854	5.523	15 km	–	catalog · MPC · JPL
(381703) 2009 HD_{84}	27 April 2009	Spacewatch	Kitt Peak	5.118	0.155	13.2	4.322	5.913	8.4 km	–	catalog · MPC · JPL
(381739) 2009 SG_{1}	17 September 2009	MLS	Mount Lemmon	5.117	0.075	23.6	4.732	5.503	11 km	–	catalog · MPC · JPL
(381987) 2010 HZ_{21}	29 May 2008	Spacewatch	Kitt Peak	5.337	0.088	26.5	4.866	5.809	11 km	–	catalog · MPC · JPL
(382150) 2011 QN_{3}	28 July 2011	Pan-STARRS 1	Haleakala	5.191	0.143	10.8	4.448	5.934	7.1 km	–	catalog · MPC · JPL
(382151) 2011 QJ_{95}	23 April 2010	WISE	WISE	5.214	0.128	26.9	4.546	5.883	15 km	–	catalog · MPC · JPL
(382224) 2012 QZ_{51}	23 January 2006	Spacewatch	Kitt Peak	5.181	0.114	24.5	4.588	5.774	11 km	–	catalog · MPC · JPL
382238 Euphemus	8 July 2011	L. Elenin	Mayhill-ISON	5.120	0.072	12.4	4.751	5.489	12 km	–	catalog · MPC · JPL
(382248) 2012 TY_{4}	5 October 2012	Pan-STARRS 1	Haleakala	5.181	0.085	4.7	4.740	5.622	8.5 km	–	catalog · MPC · JPL
(382251) 2012 TJ_{25}	22 September 2012	Spacewatch	Kitt Peak	5.255	0.126	12.7	4.593	5.917	9.2 km	–	catalog · MPC · JPL
(382253) 2012 TK_{26}	16 November 2001	Spacewatch	Kitt Peak	5.316	0.094	23.7	4.815	5.818	9.7 km	–	catalog · MPC · JPL
(382255) 2012 TC_{35}	4 February 2006	Spacewatch	Kitt Peak	5.179	0.093	14.0	4.698	5.659	10 km	–	catalog · MPC · JPL
(382259) 2012 TR_{79}	20 August 2011	Pan-STARRS 1	Haleakala	5.248	0.076	6.4	4.851	5.646	8.5 km	–	catalog · MPC · JPL
(382264) 2012 TO_{124}	29 August 2011	Pan-STARRS 1	Haleakala	5.202	0.063	2.5	4.877	5.528	7.3 km	–	catalog · MPC · JPL
(382265) 2012 TF_{133}	2 March 2006	Spacewatch	Kitt Peak	5.237	0.097	20.0	4.730	5.744	9.4 km	–	catalog · MPC · JPL
(382291) 2012 UQ_{61}	7 May 2010	WISE	WISE	5.288	0.079	27.2	4.873	5.703	9.9 km	–	catalog · MPC · JPL
(386029) 2007 EK_{23}	10 March 2007	MLS	Mount Lemmon	5.207	0.081	20.4	4.783	5.632	8.5 km	–	catalog · MPC · JPL
(386832) 2010 HU_{58}	25 April 2010	WISE	WISE	5.194	0.156	19.6	4.383	6.004	8.6 km	–	catalog · MPC · JPL
(388850) 2008 FX_{113}	31 March 2008	Spacewatch	Kitt Peak	5.226	0.173	10.7	4.324	6.128	9.4 km	–	catalog · MPC · JPL
(389889) 2012 TL_{5}	25 March 2007	MLS	Mount Lemmon	5.235	0.025	22.2	5.104	5.365	13 km	–	catalog · MPC · JPL
(392760) 2012 TK_{35}	2 December 2005	L. H. Wasserman	Kitt Peak	5.181	0.084	1.4	4.747	5.614	6.7 km	–	catalog · MPC · JPL
(397790) 2008 JR_{29}	15 April 2008	Spacewatch	Kitt Peak	5.275	0.051	5.1	5.007	5.543	7.4 km	–	catalog · MPC · JPL

back to top
