= C/2010 X1 (Elenin) =

Oort cloud comet

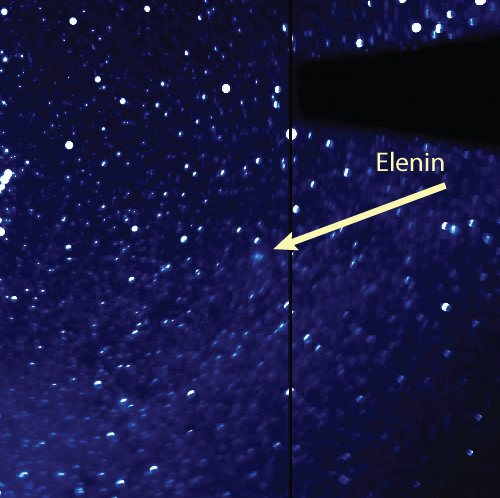
- Comet Elenin as seen by the STEREO-B spacecraft on 1 August 2011

Discovery
- Discovered by: Leonid Elenin; 0.45 m reflector (H15)
- Discovery date: 10 December 2010

Orbital characteristics
- Epoch: 31 March 2011 (JD 2455651.5)
- Orbit type: Oort cloud
- Aphelion: ~97,000 AU (1.5 ly) (inbound)
- Perihelion: 0.48242 AU
- Semi-major axis: ~48,000 AU (inbound)
- Eccentricity: 0.999990 (inbound); 1.000067 (near perihelion)
- Orbital period: millions of years (inbound)
- Inclination: 1.8396°
- Last perihelion: 10 September 2011

Physical characteristics
- Mean radius: 0.430±0.029 km
- Mean density: 450±60 kg/m^{3}

Comet C/2010 X1 (Elenin) was an Oort cloud comet discovered by Russian amateur astronomer Leonid Elenin on 10 December 2010, through remote control of the International Scientific Optical Network's robotic observatory near Mayhill in the U.S. state of New Mexico. The discovery was made using the automated asteroids discovery program CoLiTec. At the time of discovery, the comet had an apparent magnitude of 19.5, which made it about 150,000 times fainter than can be seen with the naked eye. The discoverer, Leonid Elenin, originally estimated that the comet nucleus was 3–4 km in diameter, but more recent estimates place the pre-breakup size of the comet at 2 km. Comet Elenin started disintegrating in August 2011, and as of mid-October 2011 was not visible even using large ground-based telescopes.

== Brightness ==
In April 2011, the comet was around magnitude 15 (roughly the brightness of Pluto), with a coma (expanding tenuous dust atmosphere) estimated to be about 80,000 km in diameter. As of 21 May 2011 the coma had exceeded 100,000 km, and as of August 2011 it had exceeded 200,000 km. Estimates of the comet's visual brightness varied from 13.1 to 13.8 magnitude between 22 May and 4 June, were approaching 10 by late July 2011, and were around 8.3 as of mid August 2011. Even at a magnitude of 8.3, the comet was about 5 times fainter than the naked eye can see under a completely dark sky. On 19 August 2011 comet Elenin was hit by a coronal mass ejection (CME). The comet started disintegrating, as did comet C/1999 S4. As of mid-September 2011 the comet had become dimmer than magnitude 10.5, and appeared around magnitude 12 as seen by STEREO-A. As of October 2011 the comet is projected to be about magnitude 14 and fading. By mid-October 2011 there had been no confirmed ground based sighting of Comet Elenin even using the 2.0-metre (79 in) Faulkes Telescope North with a limiting magnitude of around 20.5. The dust cloud remnants of Comet Elenin started to become visible to ground-based telescopes around 21 October 2011. The post-disintegration appearance of C/2010 X1 has been visually compared to the debris field of Shoemaker-Levy 9 as seen on 23 June 1993.

Between 1 August and 12 August 2011, NASA repeatedly rolled the STEREO-B spacecraft to view the forward scattering of light as the spacecraft, comet, and Sun aligned. As of 14 August 2011, Comet Elenin was visible in STEREO-B without rolling the craft. Because it disintegrated, SOHO failed to detect the forward scattering of light in late September. Because the orbit of Elenin is nearly coincident with the ecliptic plane with an inclination of only 1.84°, the comet entered forward-scattering geometry from STEREO-B, SOHO, and Earth. Had the comet not disintegrated, it would have allowed the dust scattering function to be studied simultaneously from two different locations.

C/2010 X1 made its closest approach to the Sun (perihelion) on 10 September 2011 at a distance of 0.4824 AU (72.17 million km; 44.84 million mi). The remnant of Elenin made its closest approach to Earth on 16 October 2011, at a distance of 0.2338 AU (34.98 million km; 21.73 million mi) or slightly closer than the planet Venus, at a relative velocity of 86,000 km/h. Before the August fading of the comet, the Minor Planet Center ephemeris projected that the originally bright comet Elenin would reach about 6th magnitude in September and October 2011, but the brightness depends on the activity level of the coma. But because Elenin disintegrated, it did not become visible to the naked eye or binoculars. Elenin made its closest apparent pass in the night sky to Comet 45P/Honda–Mrkos–Pajdušáková on the morning of 8 October, and moved apparently close to Mars on 15 October. The comet came to opposition at 178° from the Sun on 14 March 2011 and came to opposition again on 22 November 2011 at 175° from the Sun. The minimum angle between the Sun and comet occurred on September 26 (1.9°), and between 28 July and 10 October the comet was less than 45 degrees from the Sun.

== Original and future orbit ==
Given the orbital eccentricity of this object, its orbital period is not a fixed value, because it is frequently perturbed by the gravity of the planets. Near perihelion, using an August 2011 epoch, Kazuo Kinoshita shows C/2010 X1 to have a heliocentric orbital period of 600,000 years, though more perturbations will occur. For objects at such high eccentricity, the Sun's barycentric coordinates are more stable than heliocentric coordinates. The orbit of a long-period comet is properly obtained when the osculating orbit is computed at an epoch after leaving the planetary region and is calculated with respect to the center of mass of the Solar System. Using JPL Horizons with an observed orbital arc of 271 days, the barycentric orbital elements for epoch 2200 generate a hyperbolic orbit with an eccentricity of 1.0004.

Before entering the planetary region (epoch 1800), Elenin had a calculated barycentric orbital period of tens of millions of years with an apoapsis (aphelion) distance of about 97,000 AU (1.53 ly). Elenin was probably in the outer Oort cloud with a loosely bound chaotic orbit that was easily perturbed by passing stars.

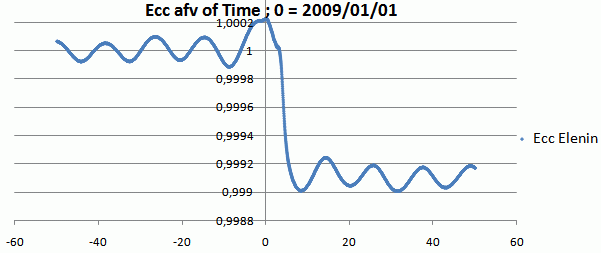
Plot showing how Comet Elenin comes into the planetary region on a hyperbolic orbit and after perihelion is perturbed into an elliptical orbit that is bound to the Sun
