= P/2015 PD229 (Cameron–ISON) =

Periodic comet

P/2015 PD_{229} (Cameron–ISON)
Discovery
- Discovered by: David A. Cameron; ISON
- Discovery site: Cerro Tololo, Chile; Siding Spring, Australia
- Discovery date: 27 May 2015; 15 August 2015

Designations
- Alternative designations: K15PM9D

Orbital characteristics
- Epoch: 21 October 2015 (JD 2457316.5)
- Observation arc: 540 days (1.5 years)
- Number of observations: 110
- Aphelion: 9.522 AU
- Perihelion: 4.832 AU
- Semi-major axis: 7.177 AU
- Eccentricity: 0.32674
- Orbital period: 19.23 years
- Inclination: 2.027°
- Longitude of ascending node: 342.77°
- Argument of periapsis: 352.37°
- Last perihelion: 14 August 2015
- Next perihelion: 11 November 2034
- T_{Jupiter}: 2.944
- Earth MOID: 3.821 AU
- Jupiter MOID: 0.106 AU

Physical characteristics
- Dimensions: 13 mi (21 km)
- Comet total magnitude (M1): 7.1
- Comet nuclear magnitude (M2): 12.6

P/2015 PD_{229} (Cameron–ISON) is a periodic comet that was initially thought to be an active centaur upon discovery. It orbits the Sun between Jupiter and Saturn once every 19.2 years, and has appeared to have made several close encounters with the giant planets from 1889 to 1949. The orbital period and low inclination mean this comet is classed as a Jupiter family comet. The comet appears to be about 13 miles across, which is bigger than most Jupiter family comets.
