= Leonid Elenin =

Russian amateur astronomer

Leonid Vladimirovich Elenin
- Born: August 10, 1981; Moscow, Soviet Union

Leonid Vladimirovich Elenin (Russian: Леони́д Влади́мирович Еле́нин; born 10 August 1981) is a Russian amateur astronomer working with the ISON-NM observatory (H15) via the International Scientific Optical Network (ISON), which is the first Russian remote observatory in the West.

Leonid Elenin works for the Keldysh Institute of Applied Mathematics and lives in Lyubertsy, Moscow region, Russia.

Leonid Elenin is best known for discovering the comet C/2010 X1 on 10 December 2010. Elenin then discovered comet P/2011 NO1 on 7 July 2011. As of 2019, Elenin had discovered five comets.

The first asteroid discovered by Leonid Elenin was 2008 XE on 1 December 2008 at Tzec (H10). The first Amor asteroid (near-Earth object) discovered by Elenin was 2010 RN_{80} on 10 September 2010 at ISON-NM (H15).

Elenin has also discovered the trailing L5 Jupiter trojan 2011 QJ_{9} on 23 August 2011, the Mars-crossing asteroid 2011 QD_{23} on 25 August 2011, and the amor asteroid (Near-Earth object) 2011 QY_{37} on 27 August 2011. The first numbered asteroid discovered by Elenin at ISON-NM is 365756 ISON (2010 WZ_{71}).

On 29 January 2013, the Minor Planet Center awarded Leonid Elenin a 2012 Edgar Wilson Award for the discovery of comets by amateurs.

== List of discovered minor planets ==
216439 Lyubertsy	15 March 2009	list
(239664) 2008 XE	1 December 2008	list
257261 Ovechkin	31 March 2009	list
269390 Igortkachenko	27 August 2009	list
(296345) 2009 FR_{4}	19 March 2009	list
(296563) 2009 QS_{35}	29 August 2009	list
301522 Chaykin	22 March 2009	list
(328939) 2010 VW_{39}	5 November 2010	list
365756 ISON	4 November 2010	list
(369485) 2010 UP_{6}	16 October 2010	list^{[A]}
(372562) 2009 UN_{20}	25 October 2009	list
382238 Euphemus	8 July 2011	list
(400697) 2009 RV_{4}	15 September 2009	list
(425381) 2010 CB_{44}	13 February 2010	list
(429070) 2009 HR_{67}	27 April 2009	list
(471002) 2009 SN_{170}	27 September 2009	list
(542206) 2013 AT_{70}	21 December 2011	list
(543833) 2014 QX_{109}	24 July 2014	list
(543855) 2014 QM_{179}	7 November 2010	list
(545213) 2011 CR_{22}	30 January 2011	list
(545257) 2011 EC_{28}	1 March 2011	list
(545367) 2011 GX_{76}	5 April 2011	list
(545905) 2011 UT_{321}	31 October 2011	list
(546087) 2010 TB_{47}	6 October 2010	list
(546168) 2010 TD_{142}	11 October 2010	list

(546194) 2010 TJ_{188}	15 October 2010	list
(546367) 2010 VD_{63}	5 November 2010	list
(546504) 2010 VH_{210}	15 October 2010	list
(546508) 2010 VJ_{212}	3 November 2010	list
(546715) 2010 XT_{25}	4 November 2010	list
(547608) 2010 TJ_{173}	15 October 2010	list
(548681) 2010 UT_{6}	16 October 2010	list
(549014) 2011 BJ_{55}	30 January 2011	list
(549095) 2011 CQ_{29}	4 February 2011	list
(549190) 2011 EE_{50}	11 March 2011	list
(550389) 2012 FO_{78}	2 January 2011	list
(550457) 2012 HP_{100}	21 April 2012	list
(550742) 2012 TP_{94}	8 October 2012	list
(550775) 2012 TJ_{140}	10 March 2011	list
(550865) 2012 TX_{302}	23 September 2012	list
(550997) 2012 UO_{168}	9 October 2012	list
(551575) 2013 FW_{12}	29 August 2011	list
(551581) 2013 FH_{30}	19 March 2013	list
(552178) 2013 TY_{144}	1 October 2013	list
(553999) 2012 FU_{78}	27 March 2012	list
(554025) 2012 HY_{10}	12 April 2012	list
(554548) 2012 UN_{104}	8 October 2012	list
(557206) 2014 TP_{78}	2 December 2010	list
(557707) 2014 WW_{161}	27 March 2012	list
(558161) 2014 XG_{38}	3 October 2013	list

(558628) 2015 BH_{44}	12 December 2014	list
(559346) 2015 CV_{28}	11 August 2012	list
(560879) 2015 MK_{68}	20 September 2012	list
(561424) 2015 TF_{101}	31 December 2011	list
(561538) 2015 TJ_{206}	6 April 2013	list
(562003) 2015 XQ_{58}	14 January 2012	list
(562257) 2015 XN_{364}	21 January 2012	list
(562272) 2015 XU_{377}	21 January 2012	list
(562596) 2016 AQ_{96}	25 February 2012	list
(562621) 2016 AY_{112}	3 November 2010	list
(563272) 2016 CO_{96}	2 December 2010	list
(563836) 2016 EW_{103}	30 January 2011	list
(566020) 2017 KX_{26}	15 March 2012	list
(566873) 2018 VQ_{49}	23 September 2012	list
(566910) 2018 VX_{64}	9 October 2013	list
(567510) 2001 VZ_{134}	11 March 2011	list
(568343) 2003 UO_{421}	24 August 2012	list
(574446) 2010 PX_{58}	13 August 2010	list
(574782) 2010 WL_{56}	5 November 2010	list
(574927) 2011 CD_{17}	4 February 2011	list
(575654) 2011 UW_{303}	31 October 2011	list
(576080) 2012 DN_{17}	31 January 2012	list
(576092) 2012 DT_{76}	31 January 2012	list
(576371) 2012 QA_{1}	11 August 2012	list
(576447) 2012 SK_{29}	20 September 2012	list

(577220) 2013 BD_{56}	31 October 2011	list
(578081) 2013 WU_{26}	8 May 2011	list
(578370) 2014 BC_{49}	3 January 2014	list
(581078) 2015 FP_{97}	23 September 2012	list
(582340) 2015 TL_{37}	25 February 2012	list
(582972) 2016 CZ_{295}	16 February 2012	list
(583079) 2016 ET_{79}	22 March 2012	list
(583353) 2016 GO_{128}	25 April 2012	list
(584084) 2016 SW_{12}	31 October 2011	list
(584914) 2017 SJ_{15}	31 December 2013	list
(585322) 2017 YJ_{15}	31 October 2011	list
(589903) 2010 VE_{201}	4 November 2010	list
(589983) 2011 AS_{16}	2 December 2010	list
(590008) 2011 BV_{83}	30 January 2011	list
(590052) 2011 EM_{50}	11 March 2011	list
(590264) 2011 UP_{321}	31 October 2011	list
(590556) 2012 DD_{59}	21 February 2012	list
(590568) 2012 DQ_{107}	16 February 2012	list
(590793) 2012 TW_{218}	14 October 2012	list
(590816) 2012 TJ_{314}	20 September 2012	list
(591193) 2013 EJ_{31}	17 October 2010	list
(591336) 2013 HY_{105}	29 October 2011	list
(591353) 2013 JD_{52}	17 April 2013	list
(591457) 2013 TK_{12}	5 September 2013	list
(591485) 2013 TP_{176}	5 October 2013	list

(591564) 2013 XM_{11}	27 November 2013	list
(591639) 2013 YO_{148}	31 December 2013	list
(591697) 2014 DP_{9}	21 February 2014	list
591763 Orishut'	27 February 2014	list
(591834) 2014 FL_{24}	6 March 2014	list
(591891) 2014 GN_{75}	4 April 2014	list
(593308) 2015 LW_{10}	21 February 2014	list
(593723) 2015 TU_{385}	9 October 2015	list
594012 Bulavina	27 December 2011	list
(594225) 2016 NP_{21}	15 July 2012	list
(594271) 2016 PS_{19}	28 December 2013	list
(599468) 2010 GB_{25}	9 April 2010	list^{[B]}
(605242) 2016 EA_{200}	11 October 2010	list
(605760) 2016 TR_{57}	24 August 2012	list
(609603) 2005 GQ_{230}	28 January 2014	list
(617118) 2003 HB_{62}	25 February 2012	list
(621921) 2011 SR_{105}	2 September 2011	list
(621982) 2011 UL_{338}	21 September 2011	list
(622579) 2014 LR_{20}	11 October 2010	list
(622653) 2014 PP_{4}	11 October 2010	list
(623280) 2015 TM_{202}	26 September 2011	list
(627977) 2012 XW_{83}	23 August 2011	list
(628494) 2015 OV_{52}	28 January 2014	list
(628952) 2017 NV	16 September 2012	list
(633251) 2009 HD_{111}	26 September 2011	list

(634341) 2011 JG_{32}	3 May 2011	list
(634397) 2011 QJ_{13}	30 June 2011	list
(634413) 2011 QR_{87}	27 August 2011	list
(634507) 2011 US_{28}	8 August 2011	list
(634508) 2011 UM_{32}	24 September 2011	list
(634509) 2011 US_{33}	19 October 2011	list
(634613) 2012 BH_{89}	8 December 2010	list
(634664) 2012 EM_{4}	31 January 2012	list
(634821) 2012 QT_{42}	7 February 2011	list
(635691) 2014 BY_{33}	20 September 2012	list
(635928) 2014 HX_{158}	17 November 2011	list
(636869) 2014 YT_{44}	24 December 2014	list
(637936) 2015 RX_{30}	31 October 2011	list
(638595) 2016 BC_{104}	26 June 2012	list
(639589) 2017 FU_{97}	24 March 2012	list
(639846) 2017 VB_{23}	24 September 2011	list
(639981) 2018 SZ_{13}	13 March 2012	list
(641540) 2004 BL_{170}	30 January 2011	list
(646430) 2008 CH_{224}	31 December 2011	list
(649067) 2010 VC_{69}	4 November 2010	list
(649162) 2010 XP_{49}	4 November 2010	list
(649228) 2011 BZ_{13}	8 December 2010	list
(649241) 2011 BO_{64}	29 January 2011	list
(649640) 2011 QZ_{34}	31 July 2011	list
(649653) 2011 QG_{57}	29 August 2011	list

(649778) 2011 SZ_{153}	27 August 2011	list
(649804) 2011 SU_{225}	23 September 2011	list
(649828) 2011 SF_{275}	27 September 2011	list
(649867) 2011 TF_{6}	2 October 2011	list
(649870) 2011 TJ_{9}	23 September 2011	list
(649873) 2011 TL_{14}	2 October 2011	list
(649874) 2011 TO_{14}	2 October 2011	list
(649891) 2011 UE_{32}	24 September 2011	list
(649933) 2011 UK_{188}	26 October 2011	list
(650005) 2011 UP_{358}	29 September 2011	list
(650605) 2012 SE_{61}	19 September 2012	list
(650606) 2012 SP_{62}	23 September 2012	list
(650816) 2012 TW_{303}	3 May 2011	list
(651001) 2012 UW_{184}	19 October 2012	list
(652292) 2013 XZ_{28}	5 December 2013	list
(652303) 2013 YO_{1}	18 July 2012	list
(652576) 2014 DW_{51}	29 August 2011	list
(652762) 2014 EQ_{149}	21 February 2014	list
(653282) 2014 NW_{36}	25 February 2012	list
(653607) 2014 QE_{471}	25 August 2014	list
(654145) 2014 XA	11 December 2010	list
(654992) 2015 FR_{238}	29 August 2011	list
(655248) 2015 HW_{155}	8 May 2011	list
(655363) 2015 KK_{61}	8 December 2012	list
(655595) 2015 OL_{66}	28 April 2011	list

(655800) 2015 RF_{77}	3 May 2011	list
(655968) 2015 TA_{199}	2 September 2011	list
(656582) 2016 CB_{64}	16 February 2012	list
(657053) 2016 GY_{163}	4 February 2013	list
(657493) 2016 QQ_{131}	27 August 2011	list
(657622) 2016 TX_{47}	3 November 2011	list
(657677) 2016 UY_{26}	29 May 2011	list
(657794) 2016 YV_{12}	11 October 2010	list
(662443) 2006 CK_{73}	9 August 2012	list
(662663) 2006 QZ_{189}	23 August 2011	list
(664913) 2008 UH_{377}	12 August 2012	list
(664981) 2008 VE_{84}	7 August 2011	list
(665243) 2009 BP_{199}	27 January 2014	list
(666984) 2010 XY_{69}	13 December 2010	list
(667202) 2011 CC_{58}	13 January 2011	list
(667268) 2011 ET_{51}	11 March 2011	list
(667599) 2011 QT_{34}	25 August 2011	list
(667655) 2011 RB_{17}	2 September 2011	list
(667712) 2011 SK_{66}	21 September 2011	list
(667743) 2011 SH_{120}	27 September 2011	list
(667843) 2011 SE_{282}	21 September 2011	list
(667906) 2011 TY_{1}	21 September 2011	list
(667911) 2011 TP_{5}	4 October 2011	list
(667924) 2011 TK_{14}	2 October 2011	list
(668041) 2011 UY_{164}	26 October 2011	list

(668128) 2011 UK_{321}	31 October 2011	list
(668329) 2011 WW_{82}	17 November 2011	list
(668429) 2011 YS_{11}	18 December 2011	list
(668530) 2012 BW_{8}	2 January 2012	list
(668567) 2012 BH_{121}	29 January 2012	list
(668705) 2012 FL_{30}	8 December 2010	list
(668715) 2012 FP_{42}	23 March 2012	list
(668743) 2012 FC_{89}	27 March 2012	list
(668805) 2012 HC_{54}	30 January 2011	list
(668866) 2012 KS_{11}	19 May 2012	list
(668952) 2012 PZ_{30}	11 August 2012	list
(668954) 2012 PS_{34}	11 August 2012	list
(669750) 2013 BT_{91}	26 September 2011	list
(669795) 2013 CZ_{55}	24 September 2011	list
(669847) 2013 CO_{138}	17 November 2011	list
(670184) 2013 HH_{4}	7 March 2013	list
(670484) 2013 SF_{52}	24 March 2012	list
(670564) 2013 TF_{174}	3 October 2013	list
(670878) 2014 CP_{20}	28 January 2014	list
(671110) 2014 GX_{24}	29 March 2014	list
(671617) 2014 OZ_{51}	8 December 2010	list
(672043) 2014 QS_{436}	30 August 2014	list
(672291) 2014 SO_{309}	8 October 2010	list
(672493) 2014 UX_{192}	3 November 2010	list
(672999) 2015 AF_{33}	3 November 2010	list

(673986) 2015 HK_{136}	23 August 2011	list
(674746) 2015 RN_{260}	21 January 2012	list
(674768) 2015 RE_{329}	8 December 2010	list
(674813) 2015 SY_{33}	23 September 2015	list
(674822) 2015 TE_{7}	5 September 2015	list
(674936) 2015 TS_{131}	7 May 2011	list
(674940) 2015 TD_{142}	25 February 2012	list
(675849) 2016 AR_{221}	15 October 2010	list
(676006) 2016 CO_{109}	30 August 2014	list
(676481) 2016 GT_{216}	8 February 2013	list
(676483) 2016 GF_{219}	15 July 2012	list
(676673) 2016 MX_{3}	31 October 2011	list
(676805) 2016 PE_{16}	21 September 2011	list
(677055) 2016 RQ_{38}	26 October 2011	list
(677175) 2016 TL_{9}	24 September 2011	list
(677252) 2016 TH_{91}	27 August 2011	list
(677367) 2016 UD_{68}	13 October 2010	list
(677434) 2016 UA_{147}	1 November 2011	list
(677577) 2017 AX	31 December 2011	list
(677624) 2017 BA_{46}	8 December 2010	list
(679928) 2021 RH_{16}	21 January 2012	list
(681882) 2005 XY_{121}	12 May 2013	list
(684827) 2008 YR_{9}	7 November 2008	list
(685922) 2010 EH_{42}	9 March 2010	list^{[B]}
(686556) 2010 XC_{56}	8 December 2010	list

(687168) 2011 QV_{95}	31 July 2011	list
(687467) 2011 US_{309}	26 October 2011	list
(687501) 2011 UB_{390}	26 October 2011	list
(687634) 2011 WU_{103}	17 November 2011	list
(687748) 2012 AH_{2}	2 January 2012	list
(688211) 2012 PA_{21}	20 July 2012	list
(690101) 2013 YL_{65}	28 December 2013	list
(691139) 2014 OX_{243}	20 October 2011	list
(691495) 2014 QF_{114}	18 August 2014	list
(691995) 2014 SS_{216}	11 October 2010	list
(692336) 2014 WP_{223}	25 May 2012	list
(692512) 2014 XQ_{8}	8 December 2010	list
(697000) 2016 UD_{17}	24 September 2011	list
(697059) 2016 UZ_{123}	23 September 2012	list
(697794) 2017 HW_{61}	1 March 2011	list
(697954) 2017 RL_{23}	31 July 2013	list
(698761) 2018 RR_{32}	25 August 2011	list
(700473) 2002 EN_{166}	29 January 2011	list
(703800) 2007 UN_{152}	23 August 2011	list
(704131) 2008 AK_{142}	24 September 2011	list
(706659) 2010 PR_{75}	15 August 2010	list
(706982) 2010 XW_{74}	2 December 2010	list
(707098) 2011 BW_{65}	27 January 2011	list
(707109) 2011 BD_{85}	29 January 2011	list
(707358) 2011 EC_{3}	30 January 2011	list

(707737) 2011 QS_{31}	25 August 2011	list
(707759) 2011 QC_{76}	23 August 2011	list
(707885) 2011 SP_{226}	23 September 2011	list
(707971) 2011 TG_{15}	2 October 2011	list
(708006) 2011 UM_{62}	24 September 2011	list
(708050) 2011 UO_{170}	23 September 2011	list
(708133) 2011 UD_{390}	26 October 2011	list
(708254) 2011 WA_{144}	24 November 2011	list
(708479) 2012 DE_{76}	26 February 2012	list
(708540) 2012 EE_{24}	15 March 2012	list
(708985) 2012 TC_{100}	8 October 2012	list
(709510) 2013 CT_{6}	31 July 2011	list
(710449) 2013 VR_{14}	11 October 2013	list
(710665) 2014 CN_{20}	28 January 2014	list
(710835) 2014 EO_{185}	29 August 2011	list
(713495) 2015 CR_{41}	3 May 2011	list
(713871) 2015 FY_{405}	28 May 2011	list
(713960) 2015 HM_{64}	26 November 2013	list
(714872) 2015 RC_{92}	1 October 2011	list
(715100) 2015 TU_{121}	2 March 2011	list
(715827) 2015 XC_{393}	20 July 2012	list
(717632) 2016 VO_{20}	26 October 2011	list
(717864) 2017 BJ_{64}	26 February 2012	list
(718042) 2017 DJ_{12}	12 April 2012	list
(718308) 2017 FM_{43}	29 January 2012	list

(719129) 2018 JR_{5}	3 May 2011	list
(719216) 2018 RM_{11}	14 July 2012	list
(726768) 2010 BZ_{108}	30 January 2011	list
(726821) 2010 CR_{18}	13 February 2010	list
(727766) 2010 JJ_{132}	29 November 2011	list
(728187) 2010 LA_{109}	20 July 2012	list
(728290) 2010 MK_{52}	8 November 2012	list
(729073) 2011 AZ_{74}	9 January 2011	list
(729561) 2011 GX_{90}	5 April 2011	list
(729637) 2011 JN_{12}	8 May 2011	list
(729762) 2011 QL_{8}	3 July 2011	list
(729797) 2011 QW_{85}	25 August 2011	list
(730063) 2011 UK_{302}	31 October 2011	list
(730064) 2011 UV_{303}	31 October 2011	list
(730076) 2011 UJ_{332}	26 October 2011	list
(730647) 2012 QG_{1}	11 August 2012	list
(731235) 2013 CD_{37}	31 October 2011	list
(731452) 2013 FK_{7}	26 October 2011	list
(733451) 2014 RO_{61}	26 February 2012	list
(735446) 2015 GP_{33}	2 October 2011	list
(736469) 2015 TT_{151}	27 August 2011	list
(736865) 2015 XC_{254}	4 February 2011	list
(737946) 2016 FV_{9}	29 January 2012	list
(738413) 2016 QK_{91}	23 November 2011	list
(738669) 2016 WM_{51}	9 December 2012	list

(740814) 2004 HG_{81}	7 February 2011	list
(740907) 2004 TH_{374}	26 September 2011	list
(743475) 2008 TB_{198}	12 August 2012	list
(745188) 2010 UW_{6}	15 October 2010	list
(745244) 2010 VH_{78}	5 November 2010	list
(745312) 2010 XN_{20}	2 December 2010	list
(745341) 2010 XB_{104}	8 December 2010	list
(745510) 2011 CZ_{78}	11 February 2011	list
(745574) 2011 DF_{54}	25 February 2011	list
(745908) 2011 OS_{58}	31 July 2011	list
(746035) 2011 SX_{3}	7 August 2011	list
(746038) 2011 SN_{11}	27 August 2011	list
(746334) 2011 UU_{292}	26 October 2011	list
(746374) 2011 UR_{389}	26 October 2011	list
(746975) 2012 LB_{14}	20 May 2012	list
(747176) 2012 TS_{20}	29 January 2011	list
(747657) 2012 XA_{117}	8 December 2012	list
(747659) 2012 XY_{129}	8 May 2011	list
(747842) 2013 BQ_{33}	31 July 2011	list
(747984) 2013 CM_{183}	6 February 2013	list
(747987) 2013 CH_{185}	8 February 2013	list
(748611) 2013 TB_{80}	9 October 2013	list
(748831) 2013 YP_{64}	28 December 2013	list
(748917) 2014 AS_{61}	3 January 2014	list
(749046) 2014 DE_{157}	23 February 2014	list

(749695) 2014 OC_{142}	19 January 2012	list
(752661) 2015 RJ_{243}	7 September 2015	list
(752933) 2015 TE_{343}	16 September 2015	list
(753242) 2015 XK_{262}	23 November 2011	list
(753426) 2016 AP_{180}	29 October 2011	list
(753729) 2016 CR_{295}	28 October 2014	list
(753758) 2016 CW_{330}	3 October 2014	list
(754365) 2016 PF_{76}	11 September 2012	list
(754445) 2016 QG_{33}	12 August 2012	list
(755407) 2017 DX_{66}	30 November 2011	list
(755465) 2017 DB_{117}	1 January 2012	list
(755970) 2017 WZ_{25}	28 January 2014	list
(756005) 2017 YJ_{6}	27 January 2014	list
(756176) 2018 PT_{27}	23 July 2012	list
(756486) 2019 NZ_{21}	30 June 2014	list
(756523) 2019 PW_{9}	23 November 2011	list
(756996) 2023 RK_{63}	7 August 2012	list
(761132) 2009 KP_{44}	2 October 2011	list
(762384) 2011 CZ_{18}	4 February 2011	list
(763402) 2012 BP_{142}	20 January 2012	list
(763524) 2012 DU_{122}	16 February 2012	list
(763792) 2012 OW_{6}	20 July 2012	list
(769030) 2015 HH_{36}	30 January 2011	list
(769296) 2015 MG_{102}	23 October 2011	list
(769881) 2015 TM_{304}	3 November 2011	list

(770068) 2015 VN_{68}	19 August 2015	list
(772015) 2017 BQ_{140}	26 October 2011	list
(776363) 2007 VV_{346}	24 September 2011	list
(779123) 2011 FS_{40}	31 March 2011	list
(779286) 2011 QJ_{57}	31 July 2011	list
(779512) 2011 UL_{42}	19 October 2011	list
(779727) 2011 WL_{97}	17 November 2011	list
(780210) 2012 NZ_{1}	15 July 2012	list
(782796) 2014 HZ_{302}	19 October 2011	list
785648 Likho	11 September 2015	list
(785897) 2015 TA_{285}	15 October 2010	list
(789090) 2017 NQ_{2}	16 September 2012	list
(790383) 2018 RT_{53}	11 August 2012	list
(796861) 2010 TG_{198}	11 October 2010	list
(797056) 2010 XU_{12}	2 December 2010	list
(797085) 2010 XR_{111}	8 December 2010	list
(797107) 2011 AC_{25}	12 December 2010	list
(797836) 2011 UW_{497}	5 September 2016	list
(797989) 2012 BJ_{2}	27 December 2011	list
(798000) 2012 BQ_{31}	20 January 2012	list
(798441) 2012 QK_{3}	11 August 2012	list
(799597) 2013 RY_{1}	1 September 2013	list
(799770) 2013 TR_{159}	15 March 2012	list
(799969) 2013 XX_{9}	21 April 2012	list
(801944) 2014 YU_{43}	30 December 2014	list

(806448) 2016 RB_{40}	11 August 2012	list
(806997) 2017 DH_{34}	24 March 2012	list
(809982) 2020 CG_{4}	28 January 2014	list
(816397) 2011 GN_{94}	9 April 2011	list
(816588) 2011 QF_{57}	29 August 2011	list
(816615) 2011 QK_{117}	27 August 2011	list
(816871) 2011 UR_{397}	30 October 2011	list
(817387) 2012 KN_{66}	3 November 2010	list
(817546) 2012 SG_{45}	21 September 2012	list
(817585) 2012 SA_{94}	11 September 2012	list
(820160) 2014 QQ_{265}	19 August 2014	list
(822537) 2015 TU_{120}	29 January 2011	list
(824981) 2017 QU_{62}	24 August 2012	list
(825576) 2018 KM_{18}	8 May 2011	list
(825776) 2018 VP_{27}	18 September 2015	list
(829841) 2007 HW_{108}	3 April 2011	list
(835059) 2011 BH_{55}	30 January 2011	list
(835578) 2011 SD_{65}	23 September 2011	list
(835785) 2011 UV_{292}	26 October 2011	list
(835888) 2011 WF_{42}	23 November 2011	list
(836364) 2012 PE_{15}	11 August 2012	list
(836584) 2012 TO_{94}	8 October 2012	list
(837152) 2013 CG_{88}	11 February 2013	list
(837946) 2013 WC_{104}	26 November 2013	list
(838077) 2013 YE_{167}	28 December 2013	list

(841037) 2015 FJ_{222}	11 August 2012	list
(841626) 2015 OZ_{20}	26 October 2011	list
(841847) 2015 QJ_{32}	18 August 2015	list
(842475) 2015 VS_{142}	11 August 2015	list
(844717) 2017 FG_{12}	31 December 2011	list
(845471) 2017 VD_{6}	2 December 2010	list
(852847) 2008 UM_{392}	7 July 2011	list
(855371) 2011 BZ_{194}	29 January 2011	list
(856247) 2011 SE_{195}	18 September 2011	list
(856275) 2011 SY_{222}	27 September 2011	list
(856600) 2011 UN_{306}	24 October 2011	list
(856804) 2011 WV_{46}	26 October 2011	list
(856849) 2011 WM_{152}	26 October 2011	list
(857122) 2012 DK_{91}	14 February 2012	list
(857414) 2012 KH_{9}	3 December 2010	list
(857491) 2012 NA_{1}	14 July 2012	list
(857877) 2012 TH_{215}	8 October 2012	list
(858237) 2012 UQ_{225}	20 October 2012	list
(858511) 2012 XZ_{155}	3 December 2012	list
(858950) 2013 EF_{129}	5 March 2013	list
(859216) 2013 HX_{140}	29 October 2011	list
(859844) 2013 SV_{103}	26 September 2013	list
(861696) 2014 OG_{150}	23 November 2011	list
(862639) 2014 QE_{511}	30 August 2014	list
(866051) 2015 PL_{1}	17 August 2015	list

(866315) 2015 RA_{9}	17 August 2015	list
(867390) 2015 XL_{116}	29 January 2011	list
(868550) 2016 EE_{143}	29 January 2012	list
(869615) 2016 RC_{7}	25 August 2011	list
(870274) 2016 WZ_{78}	27 September 2011	list
(877679) 2010 UU_{120}	17 October 2010	list
(877737) 2011 AT_{17}	2 December 2010	list
(877974) 2011 QN_{110}	23 August 2011	list
(878170) 2011 UH_{302}	31 October 2011	list
(878196) 2011 UY_{428}	26 October 2011	list
(878212) 2011 UT_{460}	31 October 2011	list
(878867) 2013 BV_{96}	25 September 2011	list
(879570) 2014 BD_{71}	28 January 2014	list
(880538) 2014 WV_{113}	3 September 2014	list
(882094) 2015 TK_{386}	11 October 2010	list
(883187) 2016 NZ_{51}	10 August 2012	list
Co-discovery made with:^{A} A. Novichonok^{B} M. B. Schwartz
