= International Scientific Optical Network =

International astronomy project

The International Scientific Optical Network or ISON (Russian: Международная научная оптическая сеть, Пулковская кооперация оптических наблюдателей) is an international project, currently consisting of about 30 telescopes at about 20 observatories in about ten countries (Russia, Ukraine (Andrushivka), Georgia (Abastumani), Uzbekistan, Tajikistan, Moldova, Spain (Teide), Switzerland (Zimmerwald), Bolivia (Tarija), USA (Mayhill), Italy (Collepardo)) which have organized to detect, monitor and track objects in space. Other observatories include the "ISON-Kislovodsk Observatory", located near Kislovodsk, North Caucasus, Russia, with the observatory code D00.

ISON is managed by the Keldysh Institute of Applied Mathematics, part of the Russian Academy of Sciences. It was credited for the discovery of comets C/2010 X1 (Elenin), P/2015 PD_{229}, and C/2012 S1 (ISON), the latter popularly known as Comet ISON.

The minor planet 365756 ISON is named for the network.

== See also ==
- List of astronomical societies
