= List of minor planets: 767001–768000 =

The following is a partial list of minor planets, running from minor-planet number 767001 through 768000, inclusive. The primary data for this and other partial lists is based on JPL's "Small-Body Orbital Elements" and data available from the Minor Planet Center. Critical list information is also provided by the MPC, unless otherwise specified from Lowell Observatory. A detailed description of the table's columns and additional sources are given on the main page including a complete list of every page in this series, and a statistical break-up on the dynamical classification of minor planets.

Also see the summary list of all named bodies in numerical and alphabetical order, and the corresponding naming citations for the number range of this particular list. New namings may only be added to this list after official publication, as the preannouncement of names is condemned by the Working Group for Small Bodies Nomenclature of the International Astronomical Union.

Near-Earth obj.	MBA (inner)	MBA (outer)	Centaur
Mars-crosser	MBA (middle)	Jupiter trojan	Trans-Neptunian obj.
Unclassified

== 767001–767100 ==
Designation			Discovery			Properties		Ref
Permanent	Provisional	Named after	Date	Site	Discoverer(s)	Category	Diam.	Ref
767001	2014 QT_{459}	—	August 20, 2014	Haleakala	Pan-STARRS 1	·	1.7 km	MPC · JPL
767002	2014 QE_{461}	—	August 20, 2014	Haleakala	Pan-STARRS 1	·	1.5 km	MPC · JPL
767003	2014 QG_{461}	—	August 20, 2014	Haleakala	Pan-STARRS 1	·	1.4 km	MPC · JPL
767004	2014 QJ_{462}	—	September 16, 2010	Mount Lemmon	Mount Lemmon Survey	·	1.3 km	MPC · JPL
767005	2014 QL_{462}	—	November 1, 2005	Kitt Peak	Spacewatch	KOR	980 m	MPC · JPL
767006	2014 QM_{462}	—	August 22, 2014	Haleakala	Pan-STARRS 1	·	1.4 km	MPC · JPL
767007	2014 QT_{463}	—	December 1, 2010	Mount Lemmon	Mount Lemmon Survey	·	1.5 km	MPC · JPL
767008	2014 QO_{464}	—	November 2, 2010	Mount Lemmon	Mount Lemmon Survey	·	1.5 km	MPC · JPL
767009	2014 QJ_{465}	—	January 14, 2011	Mount Lemmon	Mount Lemmon Survey	·	1.5 km	MPC · JPL
767010	2014 QN_{465}	—	August 23, 2014	Haleakala	Pan-STARRS 1	·	1.7 km	MPC · JPL
767011	2014 QV_{465}	—	August 25, 2014	Haleakala	Pan-STARRS 1	EOS	1.5 km	MPC · JPL
767012	2014 QW_{466}	—	August 25, 2014	Haleakala	Pan-STARRS 1	·	2.1 km	MPC · JPL
767013	2014 QA_{467}	—	December 10, 2010	Mount Lemmon	Mount Lemmon Survey	GEF	910 m	MPC · JPL
767014	2014 QZ_{467}	—	August 27, 2014	Haleakala	Pan-STARRS 1	·	1.3 km	MPC · JPL
767015	2014 QZ_{468}	—	November 21, 2005	Kitt Peak	Spacewatch	KOR	1.0 km	MPC · JPL
767016	2014 QB_{469}	—	August 27, 2014	Haleakala	Pan-STARRS 1	KOR	1.0 km	MPC · JPL
767017	2014 QV_{469}	—	December 21, 2006	Kitt Peak	Spacewatch	·	1.6 km	MPC · JPL
767018	2014 QF_{471}	—	August 29, 2014	Kitt Peak	Spacewatch	·	1.2 km	MPC · JPL
767019	2014 QM_{471}	—	August 30, 2014	Kitt Peak	Spacewatch	·	780 m	MPC · JPL
767020	2014 QT_{472}	—	August 31, 2014	Haleakala	Pan-STARRS 1	·	480 m	MPC · JPL
767021	2014 QY_{472}	—	August 31, 2014	Haleakala	Pan-STARRS 1	·	1.2 km	MPC · JPL
767022	2014 QU_{473}	—	August 31, 2014	Haleakala	Pan-STARRS 1	·	1.8 km	MPC · JPL
767023	2014 QM_{474}	—	September 15, 2009	Kitt Peak	Spacewatch	BRA	980 m	MPC · JPL
767024	2014 QO_{474}	—	August 31, 2014	Haleakala	Pan-STARRS 1	AGN	950 m	MPC · JPL
767025	2014 QS_{475}	—	July 7, 2014	Haleakala	Pan-STARRS 1	·	1.4 km	MPC · JPL
767026	2014 QL_{479}	—	September 26, 2005	Kitt Peak	Spacewatch	·	1.4 km	MPC · JPL
767027	2014 QP_{479}	—	April 12, 2005	Kitt Peak	Spacewatch	·	1.0 km	MPC · JPL
767028	2014 QG_{484}	—	January 7, 2006	Kitt Peak	Spacewatch	·	1.7 km	MPC · JPL
767029	2014 QC_{485}	—	July 28, 2014	Haleakala	Pan-STARRS 1	·	1.7 km	MPC · JPL
767030	2014 QC_{486}	—	October 2, 2010	Mount Lemmon	Mount Lemmon Survey	·	1.1 km	MPC · JPL
767031	2014 QW_{486}	—	September 23, 2005	Kitt Peak	Spacewatch	DOR	1.7 km	MPC · JPL
767032	2014 QG_{487}	—	October 12, 2010	Mount Lemmon	Mount Lemmon Survey	·	1.7 km	MPC · JPL
767033	2014 QW_{487}	—	March 15, 2012	Mount Lemmon	Mount Lemmon Survey	KOR	980 m	MPC · JPL
767034	2014 QD_{488}	—	April 23, 2007	Mount Graham	Trilling, D. E.	·	1.3 km	MPC · JPL
767035	2014 QM_{489}	—	November 12, 2010	Mount Lemmon	Mount Lemmon Survey	·	1.3 km	MPC · JPL
767036	2014 QX_{489}	—	February 9, 2008	Mount Lemmon	Mount Lemmon Survey	·	1.5 km	MPC · JPL
767037	2014 QY_{493}	—	February 7, 2006	Mount Lemmon	Mount Lemmon Survey	·	2.6 km	MPC · JPL
767038	2014 QL_{495}	—	August 20, 2014	Haleakala	Pan-STARRS 1	·	570 m	MPC · JPL
767039	2014 QD_{501}	—	August 20, 2014	Haleakala	Pan-STARRS 1	·	1.7 km	MPC · JPL
767040	2014 QN_{504}	—	August 20, 2014	Haleakala	Pan-STARRS 1	·	1.3 km	MPC · JPL
767041	2014 QU_{506}	—	August 22, 2014	Haleakala	Pan-STARRS 1	·	1.6 km	MPC · JPL
767042	2014 QC_{507}	—	August 28, 2014	Haleakala	Pan-STARRS 1	·	1.6 km	MPC · JPL
767043	2014 QW_{507}	—	August 31, 2014	Mount Lemmon	Mount Lemmon Survey	·	1.6 km	MPC · JPL
767044	2014 QW_{510}	—	September 16, 2020	Haleakala	Pan-STARRS 1	centaur	178 km	MPC · JPL
767045	2014 QK_{512}	—	August 27, 2014	Haleakala	Pan-STARRS 1	KOR	1.1 km	MPC · JPL
767046	2014 QW_{514}	—	August 22, 2014	Haleakala	Pan-STARRS 1	·	1.4 km	MPC · JPL
767047	2014 QX_{514}	—	July 3, 2014	Haleakala	Pan-STARRS 1	·	1.5 km	MPC · JPL
767048	2014 QD_{515}	—	July 4, 2014	Haleakala	Pan-STARRS 1	·	2.2 km	MPC · JPL
767049	2014 QF_{515}	—	July 1, 2014	Haleakala	Pan-STARRS 1	·	1.4 km	MPC · JPL
767050	2014 QN_{516}	—	August 31, 2014	Haleakala	Pan-STARRS 1	·	1.1 km	MPC · JPL
767051	2014 QO_{516}	—	December 4, 2015	Mount Lemmon	Mount Lemmon Survey	·	1.3 km	MPC · JPL
767052	2014 QA_{519}	—	August 27, 2014	Haleakala	Pan-STARRS 1	KOR	1.0 km	MPC · JPL
767053	2014 QO_{519}	—	August 28, 2014	Haleakala	Pan-STARRS 1	·	1.8 km	MPC · JPL
767054	2014 QQ_{519}	—	August 22, 2014	Haleakala	Pan-STARRS 1	·	1.3 km	MPC · JPL
767055	2014 QQ_{521}	—	August 28, 2014	Haleakala	Pan-STARRS 1	·	1.4 km	MPC · JPL
767056	2014 QB_{522}	—	August 27, 2014	Haleakala	Pan-STARRS 1	·	1.4 km	MPC · JPL
767057	2014 QD_{522}	—	August 31, 2014	Haleakala	Pan-STARRS 1	·	1.3 km	MPC · JPL
767058	2014 QK_{522}	—	August 27, 2014	Haleakala	Pan-STARRS 1	·	1.3 km	MPC · JPL
767059	2014 QO_{522}	—	August 28, 2014	Haleakala	Pan-STARRS 1	NEM	1.7 km	MPC · JPL
767060	2014 QO_{523}	—	November 3, 2010	Mount Lemmon	Mount Lemmon Survey	·	1.4 km	MPC · JPL
767061	2014 QP_{523}	—	August 22, 2014	Haleakala	Pan-STARRS 1	HOF	1.8 km	MPC · JPL
767062	2014 QX_{524}	—	August 22, 2014	Haleakala	Pan-STARRS 1	AGN	810 m	MPC · JPL
767063	2014 QM_{526}	—	August 31, 2014	Kitt Peak	Spacewatch	·	530 m	MPC · JPL
767064	2014 QA_{527}	—	August 28, 2014	Haleakala	Pan-STARRS 1	EOS	1.4 km	MPC · JPL
767065	2014 QL_{527}	—	August 30, 2014	Haleakala	Pan-STARRS 1	PHO	620 m	MPC · JPL
767066	2014 QM_{528}	—	August 21, 2014	Haleakala	Pan-STARRS 1	·	1.4 km	MPC · JPL
767067	2014 QP_{528}	—	August 20, 2014	Haleakala	Pan-STARRS 1	·	1.2 km	MPC · JPL
767068	2014 QR_{528}	—	August 25, 2014	Haleakala	Pan-STARRS 1	·	1.5 km	MPC · JPL
767069	2014 QE_{533}	—	August 22, 2014	Haleakala	Pan-STARRS 1	·	1.6 km	MPC · JPL
767070	2014 QD_{545}	—	August 31, 2014	Kitt Peak	Spacewatch	·	460 m	MPC · JPL
767071	2014 QO_{547}	—	August 28, 2014	Haleakala	Pan-STARRS 1	·	1.3 km	MPC · JPL
767072	2014 QP_{547}	—	August 28, 2014	Haleakala	Pan-STARRS 1	·	1.3 km	MPC · JPL
767073	2014 QQ_{547}	—	August 30, 2014	Mount Lemmon	Mount Lemmon Survey	·	850 m	MPC · JPL
767074	2014 QV_{547}	—	August 27, 2014	Haleakala	Pan-STARRS 1	·	1.5 km	MPC · JPL
767075	2014 QX_{547}	—	August 28, 2014	Haleakala	Pan-STARRS 1	·	1.2 km	MPC · JPL
767076	2014 QE_{548}	—	August 16, 2014	Haleakala	Pan-STARRS 1	·	1.3 km	MPC · JPL
767077	2014 QT_{552}	—	August 27, 2014	Haleakala	Pan-STARRS 1	·	1.3 km	MPC · JPL
767078	2014 QX_{556}	—	August 27, 2014	Haleakala	Pan-STARRS 1	·	1.5 km	MPC · JPL
767079	2014 QO_{557}	—	August 23, 2014	Haleakala	Pan-STARRS 1	·	1.4 km	MPC · JPL
767080	2014 QY_{569}	—	August 20, 2014	Haleakala	Pan-STARRS 1	·	1.5 km	MPC · JPL
767081	2014 QJ_{576}	—	August 22, 2014	Haleakala	Pan-STARRS 1	·	1.1 km	MPC · JPL
767082	2014 RR_{2}	—	October 17, 2010	Mount Lemmon	Mount Lemmon Survey	(12739)	1.3 km	MPC · JPL
767083	2014 RS_{3}	—	August 4, 2014	Haleakala	Pan-STARRS 1	AGN	970 m	MPC · JPL
767084	2014 RD_{6}	—	September 1, 2014	Mount Lemmon	Mount Lemmon Survey	·	2.0 km	MPC · JPL
767085	2014 RD_{20}	—	July 28, 2014	Haleakala	Pan-STARRS 1	·	1.6 km	MPC · JPL
767086	2014 RG_{20}	—	January 22, 2012	Haleakala	Pan-STARRS 1	HNS	960 m	MPC · JPL
767087	2014 RZ_{23}	—	October 29, 2010	Mount Lemmon	Mount Lemmon Survey	·	1.3 km	MPC · JPL
767088	2014 RA_{25}	—	February 9, 2005	Kitt Peak	Spacewatch	·	2.4 km	MPC · JPL
767089	2014 RV_{33}	—	October 25, 2011	Haleakala	Pan-STARRS 1	·	500 m	MPC · JPL
767090	2014 RC_{43}	—	March 26, 2007	Kitt Peak	Spacewatch	·	570 m	MPC · JPL
767091	2014 RB_{44}	—	June 25, 2014	Mount Lemmon	Mount Lemmon Survey	·	1.8 km	MPC · JPL
767092	2014 RP_{47}	—	October 11, 2005	Kitt Peak	Spacewatch	·	1.3 km	MPC · JPL
767093	2014 RS_{48}	—	March 19, 2013	Haleakala	Pan-STARRS 1	·	540 m	MPC · JPL
767094	2014 RT_{52}	—	May 9, 2013	Haleakala	Pan-STARRS 1	HOF	1.8 km	MPC · JPL
767095	2014 RR_{53}	—	July 28, 2014	Haleakala	Pan-STARRS 1	KOR	1.1 km	MPC · JPL
767096	2014 RB_{55}	—	July 3, 2014	Haleakala	Pan-STARRS 1	GAL	1.2 km	MPC · JPL
767097	2014 RL_{55}	—	November 27, 2010	Mount Lemmon	Mount Lemmon Survey	·	1.3 km	MPC · JPL
767098	2014 RN_{55}	—	December 2, 2005	Mauna Kea	A. Boattini	·	2.1 km	MPC · JPL
767099	2014 RG_{58}	—	August 27, 2014	Haleakala	Pan-STARRS 1	·	460 m	MPC · JPL
767100	2014 RK_{66}	—	October 18, 2009	Mount Lemmon	Mount Lemmon Survey	·	1.8 km	MPC · JPL

== 767101–767200 ==
back to top

Designation			Discovery			Properties		Ref
Permanent	Provisional	Named after	Date	Site	Discoverer(s)	Category	Diam.	Ref
767101	2014 RC_{67}	—	September 2, 2014	Haleakala	Pan-STARRS 1	·	1.3 km	MPC · JPL
767102	2014 RQ_{67}	—	September 2, 2014	Haleakala	Pan-STARRS 1	·	1.7 km	MPC · JPL
767103	2014 RF_{71}	—	September 14, 2014	Kitt Peak	Spacewatch	·	480 m	MPC · JPL
767104	2014 RJ_{73}	—	September 2, 2014	Haleakala	Pan-STARRS 1	·	1.9 km	MPC · JPL
767105	2014 RH_{74}	—	September 2, 2014	Haleakala	Pan-STARRS 1	·	540 m	MPC · JPL
767106	2014 RL_{75}	—	September 2, 2014	Haleakala	Pan-STARRS 1	·	1.3 km	MPC · JPL
767107	2014 RS_{75}	—	July 2, 2014	Mount Lemmon	Mount Lemmon Survey	·	1.2 km	MPC · JPL
767108	2014 RT_{75}	—	September 14, 2014	Mount Lemmon	Mount Lemmon Survey	·	1.6 km	MPC · JPL
767109	2014 RE_{76}	—	September 3, 2014	Mount Lemmon	Mount Lemmon Survey	·	1.4 km	MPC · JPL
767110	2014 RO_{76}	—	September 15, 2014	Mount Lemmon	Mount Lemmon Survey	·	1.2 km	MPC · JPL
767111	2014 RA_{78}	—	September 2, 2014	Haleakala	Pan-STARRS 1	·	1.5 km	MPC · JPL
767112	2014 RQ_{79}	—	September 2, 2014	Haleakala	Pan-STARRS 1	EOS	1.4 km	MPC · JPL
767113	2014 RB_{83}	—	October 17, 2010	Mount Lemmon	Mount Lemmon Survey	·	1.5 km	MPC · JPL
767114	2014 RU_{92}	—	September 2, 2014	Haleakala	Pan-STARRS 1	·	1.3 km	MPC · JPL
767115	2014 SR_{2}	—	August 22, 2014	Haleakala	Pan-STARRS 1	·	2.6 km	MPC · JPL
767116	2014 SA_{4}	—	June 28, 2014	Haleakala	Pan-STARRS 1	·	520 m	MPC · JPL
767117	2014 SW_{16}	—	August 20, 2014	Haleakala	Pan-STARRS 1	·	1.4 km	MPC · JPL
767118	2014 SH_{17}	—	September 17, 2014	Haleakala	Pan-STARRS 1	·	1.2 km	MPC · JPL
767119	2014 SC_{19}	—	February 23, 2012	Kitt Peak	Spacewatch	·	2.4 km	MPC · JPL
767120	2014 SD_{20}	—	March 27, 2008	Mount Lemmon	Mount Lemmon Survey	·	1.6 km	MPC · JPL
767121	2014 SV_{21}	—	February 6, 2007	Mount Lemmon	Mount Lemmon Survey	AGN	850 m	MPC · JPL
767122	2014 SN_{22}	—	August 31, 2014	Haleakala	Pan-STARRS 1	EOS	1.3 km	MPC · JPL
767123	2014 SY_{23}	—	September 17, 2014	Haleakala	Pan-STARRS 1	·	1.5 km	MPC · JPL
767124	2014 SX_{25}	—	February 28, 2012	Haleakala	Pan-STARRS 1	KOR	1.1 km	MPC · JPL
767125	2014 SH_{26}	—	April 10, 2013	Haleakala	Pan-STARRS 1	·	1.1 km	MPC · JPL
767126	2014 SV_{37}	—	February 7, 2011	Mount Lemmon	Mount Lemmon Survey	·	2.1 km	MPC · JPL
767127	2014 SW_{37}	—	June 5, 2013	Mount Lemmon	Mount Lemmon Survey	HOF	1.9 km	MPC · JPL
767128	2014 SZ_{44}	—	April 18, 2009	Mount Lemmon	Mount Lemmon Survey	·	1.1 km	MPC · JPL
767129	2014 SG_{51}	—	August 22, 2014	Haleakala	Pan-STARRS 1	·	1.1 km	MPC · JPL
767130	2014 SO_{52}	—	October 14, 2010	Mount Lemmon	Mount Lemmon Survey	AGN	880 m	MPC · JPL
767131	2014 SF_{53}	—	April 8, 2008	Mount Lemmon	Mount Lemmon Survey	·	1.5 km	MPC · JPL
767132	2014 SA_{54}	—	February 27, 2006	Kitt Peak	Spacewatch	·	2.5 km	MPC · JPL
767133	2014 SG_{54}	—	August 3, 2014	Haleakala	Pan-STARRS 1	·	1.5 km	MPC · JPL
767134	2014 SQ_{57}	—	August 22, 2014	Haleakala	Pan-STARRS 1	·	1.2 km	MPC · JPL
767135	2014 SO_{58}	—	November 12, 2010	Mount Lemmon	Mount Lemmon Survey	·	1.4 km	MPC · JPL
767136	2014 SN_{59}	—	September 17, 2014	Haleakala	Pan-STARRS 1	·	1.2 km	MPC · JPL
767137	2014 SB_{61}	—	October 6, 2005	Mount Lemmon	Mount Lemmon Survey	AGN	960 m	MPC · JPL
767138	2014 SH_{61}	—	May 8, 2013	Haleakala	Pan-STARRS 1	·	1.5 km	MPC · JPL
767139	2014 SS_{61}	—	September 17, 2014	Haleakala	Pan-STARRS 1	AGN	950 m	MPC · JPL
767140	2014 SL_{63}	—	November 2, 2010	Mount Lemmon	Mount Lemmon Survey	·	1.3 km	MPC · JPL
767141	2014 SW_{64}	—	September 30, 2010	Mount Lemmon	Mount Lemmon Survey	·	1.2 km	MPC · JPL
767142	2014 SB_{67}	—	July 25, 2014	Haleakala	Pan-STARRS 1	·	1.4 km	MPC · JPL
767143	2014 SG_{70}	—	October 28, 2008	Kitt Peak	Spacewatch	·	490 m	MPC · JPL
767144	2014 SJ_{70}	—	September 18, 2014	Haleakala	Pan-STARRS 1	·	1.4 km	MPC · JPL
767145	2014 SY_{70}	—	April 10, 2013	Mount Lemmon	Mount Lemmon Survey	·	1.3 km	MPC · JPL
767146	2014 SO_{71}	—	September 18, 2014	Haleakala	Pan-STARRS 1	·	1.6 km	MPC · JPL
767147	2014 SU_{72}	—	July 30, 2014	Kitt Peak	Spacewatch	·	1.3 km	MPC · JPL
767148	2014 SE_{74}	—	October 12, 2010	Mount Lemmon	Mount Lemmon Survey	·	1.3 km	MPC · JPL
767149	2014 SP_{76}	—	August 28, 2014	Haleakala	Pan-STARRS 1	TIR	2.1 km	MPC · JPL
767150	2014 SV_{78}	—	September 11, 2014	Haleakala	Pan-STARRS 1	·	1.5 km	MPC · JPL
767151	2014 SV_{80}	—	September 24, 2011	Haleakala	Pan-STARRS 1	·	450 m	MPC · JPL
767152	2014 SJ_{81}	—	October 28, 2010	Mount Lemmon	Mount Lemmon Survey	·	1.5 km	MPC · JPL
767153	2014 SR_{84}	—	September 18, 2014	Haleakala	Pan-STARRS 1	KOR	980 m	MPC · JPL
767154	2014 SP_{86}	—	September 18, 2014	Haleakala	Pan-STARRS 1	PAD	1.0 km	MPC · JPL
767155	2014 SV_{86}	—	December 24, 2005	Kitt Peak	Spacewatch	·	1.1 km	MPC · JPL
767156	2014 SF_{89}	—	November 3, 2005	Mount Lemmon	Mount Lemmon Survey	·	1.2 km	MPC · JPL
767157	2014 SV_{89}	—	September 18, 2014	Haleakala	Pan-STARRS 1	·	1.3 km	MPC · JPL
767158	2014 ST_{96}	—	February 16, 2012	Haleakala	Pan-STARRS 1	AGN	930 m	MPC · JPL
767159	2014 SL_{97}	—	August 27, 2014	Haleakala	Pan-STARRS 1	·	1.0 km	MPC · JPL
767160	2014 SS_{100}	—	August 27, 2014	Haleakala	Pan-STARRS 1	·	1.3 km	MPC · JPL
767161	2014 SZ_{101}	—	August 27, 2014	Haleakala	Pan-STARRS 1	KOR	1.0 km	MPC · JPL
767162	2014 SG_{107}	—	August 27, 2014	Haleakala	Pan-STARRS 1	·	1.4 km	MPC · JPL
767163	2014 SE_{114}	—	August 27, 2009	Kitt Peak	Spacewatch	KOR	990 m	MPC · JPL
767164	2014 SW_{116}	—	September 18, 2014	Haleakala	Pan-STARRS 1	·	1.3 km	MPC · JPL
767165	2014 SH_{118}	—	September 29, 2000	Kitt Peak	Spacewatch	DOR	2.0 km	MPC · JPL
767166	2014 SN_{122}	—	October 23, 2003	Anderson Mesa	LONEOS	·	890 m	MPC · JPL
767167	2014 SP_{123}	—	September 18, 2014	Haleakala	Pan-STARRS 1	KOR	1.0 km	MPC · JPL
767168	2014 SS_{125}	—	September 18, 2014	Haleakala	Pan-STARRS 1	KOR	1.0 km	MPC · JPL
767169	2014 SZ_{127}	—	October 12, 2010	Mount Lemmon	Mount Lemmon Survey	·	1.0 km	MPC · JPL
767170	2014 SL_{130}	—	November 3, 2005	Kitt Peak	Spacewatch	·	1.2 km	MPC · JPL
767171	2014 SH_{132}	—	November 12, 2007	Mount Lemmon	Mount Lemmon Survey	·	710 m	MPC · JPL
767172	2014 SF_{135}	—	September 18, 2014	Haleakala	Pan-STARRS 1	·	600 m	MPC · JPL
767173	2014 SJ_{140}	—	August 3, 2014	Haleakala	Pan-STARRS 1	·	1.3 km	MPC · JPL
767174	2014 SY_{145}	—	August 22, 2014	Haleakala	Pan-STARRS 1	·	2.0 km	MPC · JPL
767175	2014 SC_{150}	—	December 13, 2010	Mount Lemmon	Mount Lemmon Survey	AGN	920 m	MPC · JPL
767176	2014 SY_{154}	—	September 19, 2014	Haleakala	Pan-STARRS 1	·	1.8 km	MPC · JPL
767177	2014 SR_{158}	—	February 28, 2008	Kitt Peak	Spacewatch	·	1.9 km	MPC · JPL
767178	2014 SS_{167}	—	September 20, 2014	Mount Lemmon	Mount Lemmon Survey	·	2.2 km	MPC · JPL
767179	2014 SY_{173}	—	November 25, 2005	Mount Lemmon	Mount Lemmon Survey	KOR	1.1 km	MPC · JPL
767180	2014 SO_{174}	—	July 30, 2014	Haleakala	Pan-STARRS 1	·	1.3 km	MPC · JPL
767181	2014 SX_{175}	—	July 30, 2014	Haleakala	Pan-STARRS 1	·	1.4 km	MPC · JPL
767182	2014 SQ_{178}	—	September 20, 2014	Haleakala	Pan-STARRS 1	EUN	1.0 km	MPC · JPL
767183	2014 SJ_{181}	—	August 28, 2014	Kitt Peak	Spacewatch	·	2.0 km	MPC · JPL
767184	2014 SQ_{181}	—	August 27, 2014	Haleakala	Pan-STARRS 1	·	1.2 km	MPC · JPL
767185	2014 SX_{182}	—	December 2, 2010	Mount Lemmon	Mount Lemmon Survey	·	1.3 km	MPC · JPL
767186	2014 SW_{185}	—	August 27, 2014	Haleakala	Pan-STARRS 1	·	2.0 km	MPC · JPL
767187	2014 SP_{187}	—	August 27, 2014	Haleakala	Pan-STARRS 1	WIT	670 m	MPC · JPL
767188	2014 SO_{188}	—	March 31, 2008	Mount Lemmon	Mount Lemmon Survey	·	1.4 km	MPC · JPL
767189	2014 SP_{189}	—	December 14, 2010	Mount Lemmon	Mount Lemmon Survey	·	1.6 km	MPC · JPL
767190	2014 SR_{191}	—	December 30, 1999	Mauna Kea	C. Veillet, I. Gable	·	1.7 km	MPC · JPL
767191	2014 SU_{192}	—	August 28, 2014	Kitt Peak	Spacewatch	·	1.5 km	MPC · JPL
767192	2014 ST_{193}	—	October 12, 2010	Mount Lemmon	Mount Lemmon Survey	(5)	880 m	MPC · JPL
767193	2014 SY_{194}	—	November 9, 2009	Mount Lemmon	Mount Lemmon Survey	·	2.6 km	MPC · JPL
767194	2014 SQ_{195}	—	August 25, 2014	Haleakala	Pan-STARRS 1	·	1.5 km	MPC · JPL
767195	2014 ST_{196}	—	September 20, 2014	Haleakala	Pan-STARRS 1	·	1.5 km	MPC · JPL
767196	2014 SU_{197}	—	February 14, 2007	Mauna Kea	P. A. Wiegert	·	1.6 km	MPC · JPL
767197	2014 SY_{197}	—	July 31, 2014	Haleakala	Pan-STARRS 1	·	460 m	MPC · JPL
767198	2014 SK_{199}	—	September 20, 2014	Haleakala	Pan-STARRS 1	·	1.6 km	MPC · JPL
767199	2014 SH_{217}	—	September 4, 2014	Haleakala	Pan-STARRS 1	·	1.7 km	MPC · JPL
767200	2014 SM_{220}	—	September 20, 2014	Haleakala	Pan-STARRS 1	·	1.5 km	MPC · JPL

== 767201–767300 ==
back to top

Designation			Discovery			Properties		Ref
Permanent	Provisional	Named after	Date	Site	Discoverer(s)	Category	Diam.	Ref
767201	2014 SP_{224}	—	August 27, 2014	Haleakala	Pan-STARRS 1	·	1.4 km	MPC · JPL
767202	2014 SB_{226}	—	September 18, 2014	Haleakala	Pan-STARRS 1	HYG	2.1 km	MPC · JPL
767203	2014 SE_{229}	—	September 19, 2014	Haleakala	Pan-STARRS 1	·	1.4 km	MPC · JPL
767204	2014 SP_{231}	—	September 19, 2014	Haleakala	Pan-STARRS 1	AGN	1 km	MPC · JPL
767205	2014 SG_{233}	—	September 19, 2014	Haleakala	Pan-STARRS 1	·	570 m	MPC · JPL
767206	2014 SY_{233}	—	September 19, 2014	Haleakala	Pan-STARRS 1	AGN	840 m	MPC · JPL
767207	2014 SO_{235}	—	September 20, 2014	Haleakala	Pan-STARRS 1	·	1.5 km	MPC · JPL
767208	2014 SK_{236}	—	April 9, 2013	Haleakala	Pan-STARRS 1	EUN	860 m	MPC · JPL
767209	2014 ST_{241}	—	December 13, 2010	Mauna Kea	M. Micheli, L. Wells	·	1.9 km	MPC · JPL
767210	2014 SZ_{241}	—	August 20, 2014	Haleakala	Pan-STARRS 1	·	470 m	MPC · JPL
767211	2014 SC_{243}	—	January 10, 2011	Mount Lemmon	Mount Lemmon Survey	·	1.4 km	MPC · JPL
767212	2014 SG_{245}	—	April 14, 2004	Kitt Peak	Spacewatch	·	1.3 km	MPC · JPL
767213	2014 SH_{246}	—	September 22, 2014	Haleakala	Pan-STARRS 1	·	1.1 km	MPC · JPL
767214	2014 SL_{256}	—	September 14, 2014	Mount Lemmon	Mount Lemmon Survey	·	2.0 km	MPC · JPL
767215	2014 SL_{269}	—	August 27, 2014	Haleakala	Pan-STARRS 1	·	1.5 km	MPC · JPL
767216	2014 SU_{272}	—	September 20, 2014	Haleakala	Pan-STARRS 1	HOF	1.9 km	MPC · JPL
767217	2014 SL_{276}	—	May 10, 2007	Mount Lemmon	Mount Lemmon Survey	·	2.2 km	MPC · JPL
767218	2014 SX_{278}	—	August 28, 2014	Haleakala	Pan-STARRS 1	·	3.0 km	MPC · JPL
767219	2014 SN_{282}	—	March 29, 2011	Kitt Peak	Spacewatch	·	2.8 km	MPC · JPL
767220	2014 SE_{284}	—	September 2, 2014	Haleakala	Pan-STARRS 1	·	1.2 km	MPC · JPL
767221	2014 SK_{285}	—	September 2, 2014	Haleakala	Pan-STARRS 1	·	1.4 km	MPC · JPL
767222	2014 SP_{286}	—	September 14, 2014	Haleakala	Pan-STARRS 1	·	1.7 km	MPC · JPL
767223	2014 SG_{291}	—	August 31, 2014	Haleakala	Pan-STARRS 1	·	1.5 km	MPC · JPL
767224	2014 SU_{291}	—	October 11, 2005	Kitt Peak	Spacewatch	HOF	2.1 km	MPC · JPL
767225	2014 SY_{292}	—	September 24, 2014	Mount Lemmon	Mount Lemmon Survey	·	2.3 km	MPC · JPL
767226	2014 SZ_{293}	—	September 20, 2014	Mount Lemmon	Mount Lemmon Survey	·	1.5 km	MPC · JPL
767227	2014 SX_{294}	—	September 25, 2014	Mount Lemmon	Mount Lemmon Survey	·	2.4 km	MPC · JPL
767228	2014 SW_{295}	—	January 19, 2012	Mount Lemmon	Mount Lemmon Survey	·	1.4 km	MPC · JPL
767229	2014 SC_{296}	—	September 25, 2014	Mount Lemmon	Mount Lemmon Survey	·	1.5 km	MPC · JPL
767230	2014 SW_{297}	—	September 25, 2014	Kitt Peak	Spacewatch	·	500 m	MPC · JPL
767231	2014 SL_{298}	—	September 25, 2014	Kitt Peak	Spacewatch	·	580 m	MPC · JPL
767232	2014 SN_{315}	—	September 26, 2014	Kitt Peak	Spacewatch	·	1.7 km	MPC · JPL
767233	2014 SA_{317}	—	September 18, 2014	Haleakala	Pan-STARRS 1	·	1.2 km	MPC · JPL
767234	2014 SM_{317}	—	September 19, 2014	Haleakala	Pan-STARRS 1	·	580 m	MPC · JPL
767235	2014 SA_{329}	—	November 25, 2005	Mount Lemmon	Mount Lemmon Survey	·	1.5 km	MPC · JPL
767236	2014 SF_{329}	—	June 18, 2013	Haleakala	Pan-STARRS 1	·	2.7 km	MPC · JPL
767237	2014 SP_{347}	—	September 30, 2014	Kitt Peak	Spacewatch	·	1.4 km	MPC · JPL
767238	2014 SP_{352}	—	September 20, 2014	Haleakala	Pan-STARRS 1	·	1.4 km	MPC · JPL
767239	2014 SH_{355}	—	October 11, 2009	Mount Lemmon	Mount Lemmon Survey	·	1.6 km	MPC · JPL
767240	2014 SH_{358}	—	November 7, 2010	Mount Lemmon	Mount Lemmon Survey	·	1.6 km	MPC · JPL
767241	2014 SX_{358}	—	September 19, 2014	Haleakala	Pan-STARRS 1	·	1.2 km	MPC · JPL
767242	2014 SC_{359}	—	September 19, 2014	Haleakala	Pan-STARRS 1	·	1.4 km	MPC · JPL
767243	2014 SM_{360}	—	September 20, 2014	Haleakala	Pan-STARRS 1	·	1.7 km	MPC · JPL
767244	2014 SO_{360}	—	September 19, 2009	Mount Lemmon	Mount Lemmon Survey	KOR	1.1 km	MPC · JPL
767245	2014 SQ_{362}	—	October 29, 2008	Kitt Peak	Spacewatch	·	3.3 km	MPC · JPL
767246	2014 SU_{365}	—	September 23, 2015	Haleakala	Pan-STARRS 1	BRA	1.2 km	MPC · JPL
767247	2014 SM_{366}	—	September 22, 2014	Haleakala	Pan-STARRS 1	L5	6.9 km	MPC · JPL
767248	2014 SR_{366}	—	September 17, 2014	Haleakala	Pan-STARRS 1	·	1.4 km	MPC · JPL
767249	2014 SE_{367}	—	December 1, 2015	Kitt Peak	Spacewatch	ADE	1.7 km	MPC · JPL
767250	2014 SV_{370}	—	March 5, 2017	Haleakala	Pan-STARRS 1	·	1.5 km	MPC · JPL
767251	2014 SU_{375}	—	April 3, 2017	Haleakala	Pan-STARRS 1	KOR	1.0 km	MPC · JPL
767252	2014 SQ_{377}	—	September 19, 2014	Haleakala	Pan-STARRS 1	·	1.6 km	MPC · JPL
767253	2014 ST_{377}	—	September 22, 2014	Haleakala	Pan-STARRS 1	L5	10 km	MPC · JPL
767254	2014 SJ_{378}	—	September 21, 2014	Cerro Tololo-DECam	S. S. Sheppard, C. A. Trujillo	centaur	119 km	MPC · JPL
767255	2014 SP_{378}	—	September 19, 2014	Haleakala	Pan-STARRS 1	·	1.5 km	MPC · JPL
767256	2014 SU_{378}	—	September 28, 2014	Haleakala	Pan-STARRS 1	·	1.5 km	MPC · JPL
767257	2014 SC_{380}	—	September 29, 2014	Haleakala	Pan-STARRS 1	·	1.3 km	MPC · JPL
767258	2014 SK_{380}	—	September 22, 2014	Haleakala	Pan-STARRS 1	·	1.5 km	MPC · JPL
767259	2014 SA_{381}	—	September 19, 2014	Haleakala	Pan-STARRS 1	·	1.9 km	MPC · JPL
767260	2014 SC_{381}	—	September 19, 2014	Haleakala	Pan-STARRS 1	AGN	1.0 km	MPC · JPL
767261	2014 SM_{381}	—	September 19, 2014	Haleakala	Pan-STARRS 1	·	1.2 km	MPC · JPL
767262	2014 SB_{382}	—	September 28, 2014	Haleakala	Pan-STARRS 1	·	1.3 km	MPC · JPL
767263	2014 SM_{382}	—	September 23, 2014	Haleakala	Pan-STARRS 1	·	1.4 km	MPC · JPL
767264	2014 SO_{382}	—	September 18, 2014	Haleakala	Pan-STARRS 1	·	460 m	MPC · JPL
767265	2014 SE_{383}	—	September 23, 2014	Mount Lemmon	Mount Lemmon Survey	·	1.9 km	MPC · JPL
767266	2014 SF_{383}	—	September 18, 2014	Haleakala	Pan-STARRS 1	·	1.2 km	MPC · JPL
767267	2014 SG_{387}	—	September 20, 2014	Haleakala	Pan-STARRS 1	EOS	1.3 km	MPC · JPL
767268	2014 SG_{388}	—	September 18, 2014	Haleakala	Pan-STARRS 1	·	2.0 km	MPC · JPL
767269	2014 SR_{394}	—	October 27, 2009	Mount Lemmon	Mount Lemmon Survey	EOS	1.5 km	MPC · JPL
767270	2014 SE_{395}	—	September 25, 2014	Mount Lemmon	Mount Lemmon Survey	·	1.1 km	MPC · JPL
767271	2014 SS_{395}	—	September 22, 2014	Kitt Peak	Spacewatch	·	1.3 km	MPC · JPL
767272	2014 SX_{397}	—	September 24, 2014	Mount Lemmon	Mount Lemmon Survey	·	1.6 km	MPC · JPL
767273	2014 SQ_{398}	—	September 29, 2014	Piszkés-tető	K. Sárneczky, P. Székely	·	2.1 km	MPC · JPL
767274	2014 SC_{408}	—	September 20, 2014	Haleakala	Pan-STARRS 1	·	1.3 km	MPC · JPL
767275	2014 SJ_{408}	—	September 20, 2014	Haleakala	Pan-STARRS 1	·	1.5 km	MPC · JPL
767276	2014 SX_{408}	—	September 24, 2014	Mount Lemmon	Mount Lemmon Survey	·	490 m	MPC · JPL
767277	2014 SH_{410}	—	September 19, 2014	Haleakala	Pan-STARRS 1	AGN	760 m	MPC · JPL
767278	2014 SJ_{410}	—	September 20, 2014	Haleakala	Pan-STARRS 1	·	1.3 km	MPC · JPL
767279	2014 SA_{417}	—	September 23, 2014	Mount Lemmon	Mount Lemmon Survey	·	580 m	MPC · JPL
767280	2014 SY_{419}	—	September 25, 2014	Mount Lemmon	Mount Lemmon Survey	HOF	1.8 km	MPC · JPL
767281	2014 SU_{420}	—	September 18, 2014	Haleakala	Pan-STARRS 1	·	1.3 km	MPC · JPL
767282	2014 TJ_{1}	—	September 2, 2014	Haleakala	Pan-STARRS 1	·	1.4 km	MPC · JPL
767283	2014 TP_{15}	—	October 1, 2014	Haleakala	Pan-STARRS 1	·	1.9 km	MPC · JPL
767284	2014 TV_{17}	—	October 1, 2014	Haleakala	Pan-STARRS 1	·	580 m	MPC · JPL
767285	2014 TD_{45}	—	September 22, 2003	Kitt Peak	Spacewatch	·	2.2 km	MPC · JPL
767286	2014 TV_{46}	—	October 13, 2014	Mount Lemmon	Mount Lemmon Survey	·	470 m	MPC · JPL
767287	2014 TV_{50}	—	October 1, 2014	Haleakala	Pan-STARRS 1	·	570 m	MPC · JPL
767288	2014 TQ_{54}	—	August 31, 2014	Haleakala	Pan-STARRS 1	·	1.6 km	MPC · JPL
767289	2014 TR_{55}	—	July 8, 2010	Kitt Peak	Spacewatch	NYS	1.0 km	MPC · JPL
767290	2014 TJ_{56}	—	October 15, 2014	Mount Lemmon	Mount Lemmon Survey	·	600 m	MPC · JPL
767291	2014 TL_{56}	—	October 15, 2014	Mount Lemmon	Mount Lemmon Survey	·	1.7 km	MPC · JPL
767292	2014 TU_{66}	—	August 31, 2014	Haleakala	Pan-STARRS 1	·	2.1 km	MPC · JPL
767293	2014 TG_{67}	—	October 21, 2009	Mount Lemmon	Mount Lemmon Survey	·	1.5 km	MPC · JPL
767294	2014 TF_{73}	—	January 29, 2009	Kitt Peak	Spacewatch	·	490 m	MPC · JPL
767295	2014 TR_{73}	—	October 15, 2014	Kitt Peak	Spacewatch	·	1.7 km	MPC · JPL
767296	2014 TZ_{75}	—	November 1, 2010	Mount Lemmon	Mount Lemmon Survey	·	890 m	MPC · JPL
767297	2014 TL_{77}	—	March 17, 2001	Kitt Peak	Spacewatch	EOS	1.4 km	MPC · JPL
767298	2014 TT_{77}	—	September 29, 2014	Haleakala	Pan-STARRS 1	·	1.3 km	MPC · JPL
767299	2014 TX_{79}	—	April 17, 2013	Cerro Tololo-DECam	DECam	·	480 m	MPC · JPL
767300	2014 TH_{80}	—	October 1, 2014	Haleakala	Pan-STARRS 1	·	1.4 km	MPC · JPL

== 767301–767400 ==
back to top

Designation			Discovery			Properties		Ref
Permanent	Provisional	Named after	Date	Site	Discoverer(s)	Category	Diam.	Ref
767301	2014 TE_{81}	—	January 27, 2007	Mount Lemmon	Mount Lemmon Survey	·	990 m	MPC · JPL
767302	2014 TM_{81}	—	October 11, 2009	Bisei	BATTeRS	KOR	1.0 km	MPC · JPL
767303	2014 TN_{86}	—	October 16, 2009	Mount Lemmon	Mount Lemmon Survey	H	370 m	MPC · JPL
767304	2014 TP_{89}	—	October 16, 2009	Mount Lemmon	Mount Lemmon Survey	·	2.1 km	MPC · JPL
767305	2014 TX_{91}	—	October 1, 2014	Haleakala	Pan-STARRS 1	·	510 m	MPC · JPL
767306	2014 TZ_{91}	—	October 1, 2014	Haleakala	Pan-STARRS 1	·	1.6 km	MPC · JPL
767307	2014 TK_{92}	—	October 2, 2014	Haleakala	Pan-STARRS 1	·	1.7 km	MPC · JPL
767308	2014 TA_{94}	—	November 7, 2010	Mount Lemmon	Mount Lemmon Survey	·	1.6 km	MPC · JPL
767309	2014 TB_{94}	—	October 4, 2014	Kitt Peak	Spacewatch	HOF	1.9 km	MPC · JPL
767310	2014 TG_{94}	—	February 5, 2011	Haleakala	Pan-STARRS 1	EOS	1.3 km	MPC · JPL
767311	2014 TN_{94}	—	October 5, 2014	Mount Lemmon	Mount Lemmon Survey	KOR	1.0 km	MPC · JPL
767312	2014 TS_{94}	—	October 7, 2014	Haleakala	Pan-STARRS 1	(18466)	1.8 km	MPC · JPL
767313	2014 TE_{96}	—	October 2, 2014	Mount Lemmon	Mount Lemmon Survey	EOS	1.3 km	MPC · JPL
767314	2014 TX_{96}	—	October 3, 2014	Mount Lemmon	Mount Lemmon Survey	·	580 m	MPC · JPL
767315	2014 TF_{97}	—	October 2, 2014	Haleakala	Pan-STARRS 1	·	440 m	MPC · JPL
767316	2014 TA_{98}	—	October 12, 2014	Mount Lemmon	Mount Lemmon Survey	·	2.2 km	MPC · JPL
767317	2014 TC_{98}	—	March 20, 2017	Haleakala	Pan-STARRS 1	·	1.8 km	MPC · JPL
767318	2014 TK_{98}	—	October 1, 2014	Haleakala	Pan-STARRS 1	·	1.6 km	MPC · JPL
767319	2014 TZ_{98}	—	October 3, 2014	Mount Lemmon	Mount Lemmon Survey	·	1.2 km	MPC · JPL
767320	2014 TP_{99}	—	October 2, 2014	Haleakala	Pan-STARRS 1	(18466)	1.7 km	MPC · JPL
767321 Inceu	2014 TJ_{100}	Inceu	October 3, 2014	La Palma	EURONEAR	·	400 m	MPC · JPL
767322	2014 TX_{101}	—	October 3, 2014	Mount Lemmon	Mount Lemmon Survey	·	1.6 km	MPC · JPL
767323	2014 TX_{102}	—	October 5, 2014	Kitt Peak	Spacewatch	·	560 m	MPC · JPL
767324	2014 TV_{104}	—	October 1, 2014	Haleakala	Pan-STARRS 1	615	940 m	MPC · JPL
767325	2014 TC_{105}	—	October 14, 2014	Mount Lemmon	Mount Lemmon Survey	·	2.3 km	MPC · JPL
767326	2014 TS_{107}	—	October 1, 2014	Haleakala	Pan-STARRS 1	·	1.9 km	MPC · JPL
767327 Diamandi	2014 TK_{111}	Diamandi	October 3, 2014	La Palma	EURONEAR	·	1.5 km	MPC · JPL
767328	2014 TS_{112}	—	October 4, 2006	Mount Lemmon	Mount Lemmon Survey	(5)	810 m	MPC · JPL
767329	2014 TO_{113}	—	October 1, 2014	Haleakala	Pan-STARRS 1	·	1.4 km	MPC · JPL
767330	2014 TL_{117}	—	October 1, 2014	Haleakala	Pan-STARRS 1	·	480 m	MPC · JPL
767331	2014 TZ_{123}	—	October 14, 2014	Mount Lemmon	Mount Lemmon Survey	·	1.2 km	MPC · JPL
767332	2014 UD_{9}	—	October 16, 2014	Nogales	M. Schwartz, P. R. Holvorcem	·	720 m	MPC · JPL
767333	2014 UY_{9}	—	September 15, 2009	Kitt Peak	Spacewatch	·	1.4 km	MPC · JPL
767334	2014 US_{11}	—	October 17, 2014	Kitt Peak	Spacewatch	·	570 m	MPC · JPL
767335	2014 UM_{17}	—	July 14, 2013	Haleakala	Pan-STARRS 1	·	2.4 km	MPC · JPL
767336	2014 UP_{20}	—	June 16, 2010	Mount Lemmon	Mount Lemmon Survey	·	580 m	MPC · JPL
767337	2014 UL_{30}	—	September 24, 2014	Mount Lemmon	Mount Lemmon Survey	·	520 m	MPC · JPL
767338	2014 UP_{40}	—	September 22, 2014	Haleakala	Pan-STARRS 1	WIT	740 m	MPC · JPL
767339	2014 UY_{40}	—	March 9, 2007	Mount Lemmon	Mount Lemmon Survey	·	1.6 km	MPC · JPL
767340	2014 UU_{48}	—	August 26, 2000	Cerro Tololo	Deep Ecliptic Survey	·	1.4 km	MPC · JPL
767341	2014 UV_{54}	—	October 23, 2014	Kitt Peak	Spacewatch	·	530 m	MPC · JPL
767342	2014 UJ_{58}	—	October 18, 2014	Mount Lemmon	Mount Lemmon Survey	·	1.4 km	MPC · JPL
767343	2014 UH_{59}	—	October 18, 2014	Mount Lemmon	Mount Lemmon Survey	VER	2.2 km	MPC · JPL
767344	2014 UC_{62}	—	September 13, 2007	Mount Lemmon	Mount Lemmon Survey	·	460 m	MPC · JPL
767345	2014 UG_{64}	—	September 20, 2003	Kitt Peak	Spacewatch	·	2.2 km	MPC · JPL
767346	2014 UO_{69}	—	October 21, 2014	Mount Lemmon	Mount Lemmon Survey	(13314)	1.4 km	MPC · JPL
767347	2014 UA_{79}	—	September 2, 2014	Haleakala	Pan-STARRS 1	ELF	2.9 km	MPC · JPL
767348	2014 UJ_{79}	—	October 5, 2014	Kitt Peak	Spacewatch	·	1.5 km	MPC · JPL
767349	2014 UG_{81}	—	February 25, 2011	Kitt Peak	Spacewatch	·	2.2 km	MPC · JPL
767350	2014 UL_{81}	—	August 24, 2008	Kitt Peak	Spacewatch	·	2.1 km	MPC · JPL
767351	2014 UV_{81}	—	August 25, 2014	Haleakala	Pan-STARRS 1	·	510 m	MPC · JPL
767352	2014 UL_{88}	—	September 23, 2008	Kitt Peak	Spacewatch	·	2.2 km	MPC · JPL
767353	2014 UT_{94}	—	September 30, 2014	Mount Lemmon	Mount Lemmon Survey	·	1.7 km	MPC · JPL
767354	2014 UQ_{95}	—	August 31, 2014	Haleakala	Pan-STARRS 1	·	1.3 km	MPC · JPL
767355	2014 UR_{97}	—	May 22, 2001	Cerro Tololo	Deep Ecliptic Survey	·	520 m	MPC · JPL
767356	2014 UT_{101}	—	September 14, 2014	Kitt Peak	Spacewatch	VER	2.3 km	MPC · JPL
767357	2014 UH_{105}	—	September 7, 2014	Haleakala	Pan-STARRS 1	DOR	2.1 km	MPC · JPL
767358	2014 UJ_{118}	—	October 21, 2014	Mount Lemmon	Mount Lemmon Survey	L5	7.4 km	MPC · JPL
767359	2014 UL_{118}	—	September 25, 2014	Catalina	CSS	·	2.3 km	MPC · JPL
767360	2014 UG_{119}	—	October 18, 2009	Mount Lemmon	Mount Lemmon Survey	·	1.5 km	MPC · JPL
767361	2014 UH_{123}	—	October 22, 2014	Mount Lemmon	Mount Lemmon Survey	·	1.7 km	MPC · JPL
767362	2014 UY_{128}	—	June 17, 2010	Mount Lemmon	Mount Lemmon Survey	·	500 m	MPC · JPL
767363	2014 UP_{130}	—	September 23, 2008	Kitt Peak	Spacewatch	·	2.1 km	MPC · JPL
767364	2014 UK_{131}	—	October 30, 2005	Kitt Peak	Spacewatch	·	1.4 km	MPC · JPL
767365	2014 UJ_{133}	—	October 24, 2014	Kitt Peak	Spacewatch	·	1.4 km	MPC · JPL
767366	2014 UX_{136}	—	October 24, 2014	Kitt Peak	Spacewatch	·	510 m	MPC · JPL
767367	2014 UW_{139}	—	August 10, 2007	Kitt Peak	Spacewatch	·	560 m	MPC · JPL
767368	2014 UO_{141}	—	September 3, 2014	Kitt Peak	Spacewatch	EOS	1.5 km	MPC · JPL
767369	2014 UJ_{145}	—	October 25, 2014	Mount Lemmon	Mount Lemmon Survey	·	460 m	MPC · JPL
767370	2014 UL_{145}	—	October 25, 2014	Mount Lemmon	Mount Lemmon Survey	·	1.4 km	MPC · JPL
767371	2014 UA_{149}	—	October 25, 2014	Kitt Peak	Spacewatch	EOS	1.4 km	MPC · JPL
767372	2014 UP_{152}	—	November 9, 2007	Kitt Peak	Spacewatch	·	790 m	MPC · JPL
767373	2014 UT_{159}	—	October 25, 2014	Haleakala	Pan-STARRS 1	·	1.5 km	MPC · JPL
767374	2014 UQ_{164}	—	March 15, 2012	Mount Lemmon	Mount Lemmon Survey	·	1.6 km	MPC · JPL
767375	2014 UV_{173}	—	October 28, 2014	Mount Lemmon	Mount Lemmon Survey	·	2.4 km	MPC · JPL
767376	2014 UB_{175}	—	March 19, 2013	Haleakala	Pan-STARRS 1	·	630 m	MPC · JPL
767377	2014 UK_{176}	—	October 1, 2014	Haleakala	Pan-STARRS 1	·	1.4 km	MPC · JPL
767378	2014 UV_{179}	—	August 31, 2014	Haleakala	Pan-STARRS 1	AGN	1.0 km	MPC · JPL
767379	2014 UO_{187}	—	September 16, 2009	Kitt Peak	Spacewatch	·	1.5 km	MPC · JPL
767380	2014 UJ_{197}	—	October 16, 2014	Mount Lemmon	Mount Lemmon Survey	·	1.6 km	MPC · JPL
767381	2014 UN_{198}	—	September 30, 2009	Mount Lemmon	Mount Lemmon Survey	·	1.3 km	MPC · JPL
767382	2014 UG_{201}	—	October 2, 2014	Haleakala	Pan-STARRS 1	·	1.4 km	MPC · JPL
767383	2014 UU_{205}	—	October 24, 2014	Kitt Peak	Spacewatch	EOS	1.3 km	MPC · JPL
767384	2014 UO_{208}	—	September 9, 2007	Kitt Peak	Spacewatch	·	520 m	MPC · JPL
767385	2014 UR_{233}	—	October 17, 2014	Kitt Peak	Spacewatch	·	1.4 km	MPC · JPL
767386	2014 UE_{238}	—	September 23, 2008	Kitt Peak	Spacewatch	·	2.2 km	MPC · JPL
767387	2014 UJ_{238}	—	October 28, 2014	Haleakala	Pan-STARRS 1	·	1.4 km	MPC · JPL
767388	2014 UL_{238}	—	October 28, 2014	Haleakala	Pan-STARRS 1	·	3.5 km	MPC · JPL
767389	2014 UB_{239}	—	October 28, 2014	Haleakala	Pan-STARRS 1	·	3.2 km	MPC · JPL
767390	2014 UH_{239}	—	October 29, 2014	Haleakala	Pan-STARRS 1	·	1.8 km	MPC · JPL
767391	2014 UO_{239}	—	February 10, 2011	Mount Lemmon	Mount Lemmon Survey	·	1.3 km	MPC · JPL
767392	2014 UC_{240}	—	December 5, 2010	Mount Lemmon	Mount Lemmon Survey	·	1.5 km	MPC · JPL
767393	2014 UG_{240}	—	October 30, 2014	Kitt Peak	Spacewatch	·	980 m	MPC · JPL
767394	2014 UE_{242}	—	October 22, 2014	Mount Lemmon	Mount Lemmon Survey	·	2.0 km	MPC · JPL
767395	2014 UY_{242}	—	January 27, 2016	Haleakala	Pan-STARRS 1	EOS	1.4 km	MPC · JPL
767396	2014 UA_{243}	—	April 16, 2013	Cerro Tololo-DECam	DECam	·	530 m	MPC · JPL
767397	2014 US_{243}	—	October 26, 2014	Haleakala	Pan-STARRS 1	·	2.0 km	MPC · JPL
767398	2014 UN_{246}	—	October 26, 2014	Haleakala	Pan-STARRS 1	·	1.7 km	MPC · JPL
767399	2014 US_{252}	—	April 25, 2017	Haleakala	Pan-STARRS 1	·	1.1 km	MPC · JPL
767400	2014 UH_{255}	—	October 28, 2014	Haleakala	Pan-STARRS 1	·	1.6 km	MPC · JPL

== 767401–767500 ==
back to top

Designation			Discovery			Properties		Ref
Permanent	Provisional	Named after	Date	Site	Discoverer(s)	Category	Diam.	Ref
767401	2014 UQ_{255}	—	February 8, 2011	Mount Lemmon	Mount Lemmon Survey	·	1.6 km	MPC · JPL
767402	2014 UH_{258}	—	October 25, 2014	Mount Lemmon	Mount Lemmon Survey	·	540 m	MPC · JPL
767403	2014 UT_{258}	—	October 25, 2014	Haleakala	Pan-STARRS 1	·	2.2 km	MPC · JPL
767404	2014 UX_{258}	—	October 25, 2014	Mount Lemmon	Mount Lemmon Survey	·	2.0 km	MPC · JPL
767405	2014 UY_{258}	—	October 25, 2014	Haleakala	Pan-STARRS 1	·	1.5 km	MPC · JPL
767406	2014 UW_{259}	—	October 24, 2014	Mount Lemmon	Mount Lemmon Survey	·	1.7 km	MPC · JPL
767407	2014 UD_{261}	—	October 25, 2014	Haleakala	Pan-STARRS 1	·	480 m	MPC · JPL
767408	2014 UY_{262}	—	October 31, 2014	Kitt Peak	Spacewatch	·	470 m	MPC · JPL
767409	2014 UG_{263}	—	October 28, 2014	Haleakala	Pan-STARRS 1	·	1.4 km	MPC · JPL
767410	2014 UW_{263}	—	October 17, 2014	Mount Lemmon	Mount Lemmon Survey	·	1.8 km	MPC · JPL
767411	2014 UR_{265}	—	October 25, 2014	Haleakala	Pan-STARRS 1	·	2.4 km	MPC · JPL
767412	2014 UR_{268}	—	October 26, 2014	Haleakala	Pan-STARRS 1	·	1.7 km	MPC · JPL
767413	2014 UU_{269}	—	October 28, 2014	Haleakala	Pan-STARRS 1	·	1.6 km	MPC · JPL
767414	2014 UA_{271}	—	October 30, 2014	Mount Lemmon	Mount Lemmon Survey	L5	6.8 km	MPC · JPL
767415	2014 UC_{271}	—	October 29, 2014	Haleakala	Pan-STARRS 1	·	1.4 km	MPC · JPL
767416	2014 UJ_{272}	—	October 29, 2014	Kitt Peak	Spacewatch	·	1.5 km	MPC · JPL
767417	2014 UH_{273}	—	October 24, 2014	Kitt Peak	Spacewatch	·	620 m	MPC · JPL
767418	2014 UA_{274}	—	October 24, 2014	Kitt Peak	Spacewatch	HOF	1.9 km	MPC · JPL
767419	2014 UB_{278}	—	October 23, 2014	Kitt Peak	Spacewatch	L5	6.0 km	MPC · JPL
767420	2014 UW_{289}	—	October 29, 2014	Haleakala	Pan-STARRS 1	·	1.4 km	MPC · JPL
767421	2014 UE_{290}	—	October 25, 2014	Mount Lemmon	Mount Lemmon Survey	·	1.2 km	MPC · JPL
767422	2014 VO_{7}	—	October 21, 2014	Mount Lemmon	Mount Lemmon Survey	L5	7.9 km	MPC · JPL
767423	2014 VQ_{11}	—	October 30, 2014	Haleakala	Pan-STARRS 1	·	1.9 km	MPC · JPL
767424	2014 VH_{16}	—	October 18, 2014	Mount Lemmon	Mount Lemmon Survey	EOS	1.3 km	MPC · JPL
767425	2014 VU_{20}	—	February 9, 2008	Kitt Peak	Spacewatch	·	810 m	MPC · JPL
767426	2014 VM_{31}	—	November 14, 2014	Kitt Peak	Spacewatch	·	1.7 km	MPC · JPL
767427	2014 VN_{35}	—	October 29, 2014	Kitt Peak	Spacewatch	·	410 m	MPC · JPL
767428	2014 VV_{41}	—	November 15, 2014	Mount Lemmon	Mount Lemmon Survey	·	2.1 km	MPC · JPL
767429	2014 WP_{1}	—	May 8, 2013	Haleakala	Pan-STARRS 1	·	900 m	MPC · JPL
767430	2014 WY_{1}	—	November 17, 2009	Kitt Peak	Spacewatch	EOS	1.2 km	MPC · JPL
767431	2014 WD_{9}	—	February 2, 2009	Kitt Peak	Spacewatch	·	480 m	MPC · JPL
767432	2014 WP_{13}	—	October 14, 2009	Mount Lemmon	Mount Lemmon Survey	KOR	920 m	MPC · JPL
767433	2014 WG_{18}	—	November 16, 2014	Mount Lemmon	Mount Lemmon Survey	·	710 m	MPC · JPL
767434	2014 WL_{20}	—	October 24, 2014	Kitt Peak	Spacewatch	·	1.7 km	MPC · JPL
767435	2014 WQ_{21}	—	September 21, 2008	Mount Lemmon	Mount Lemmon Survey	·	2.0 km	MPC · JPL
767436	2014 WZ_{25}	—	November 17, 2014	Mount Lemmon	Mount Lemmon Survey	·	1.7 km	MPC · JPL
767437	2014 WJ_{26}	—	September 14, 2007	Mount Lemmon	Mount Lemmon Survey	·	540 m	MPC · JPL
767438	2014 WQ_{28}	—	October 25, 2014	Haleakala	Pan-STARRS 1	·	1.2 km	MPC · JPL
767439	2014 WC_{30}	—	November 17, 2014	Mount Lemmon	Mount Lemmon Survey	·	2.0 km	MPC · JPL
767440	2014 WE_{33}	—	October 28, 2014	Haleakala	Pan-STARRS 1	·	1.6 km	MPC · JPL
767441	2014 WH_{33}	—	January 3, 2011	Mount Lemmon	Mount Lemmon Survey	·	1.5 km	MPC · JPL
767442	2014 WF_{37}	—	December 14, 2010	Mount Lemmon	Mount Lemmon Survey	·	1.2 km	MPC · JPL
767443	2014 WN_{38}	—	November 17, 2014	Haleakala	Pan-STARRS 1	·	500 m	MPC · JPL
767444	2014 WA_{39}	—	November 17, 2014	Haleakala	Pan-STARRS 1	·	1.4 km	MPC · JPL
767445	2014 WU_{39}	—	September 24, 2014	Mount Lemmon	Mount Lemmon Survey	·	1.7 km	MPC · JPL
767446	2014 WY_{42}	—	August 31, 2014	Haleakala	Pan-STARRS 1	·	530 m	MPC · JPL
767447	2014 WC_{43}	—	September 27, 2005	Kitt Peak	Spacewatch	·	1.2 km	MPC · JPL
767448	2014 WM_{44}	—	April 21, 2013	Mount Lemmon	Mount Lemmon Survey	·	600 m	MPC · JPL
767449	2014 WY_{45}	—	February 7, 2011	Mount Lemmon	Mount Lemmon Survey	AGN	960 m	MPC · JPL
767450	2014 WA_{46}	—	September 20, 2009	Kitt Peak	Spacewatch	·	1.3 km	MPC · JPL
767451	2014 WG_{54}	—	October 23, 2014	Kitt Peak	Spacewatch	·	1.6 km	MPC · JPL
767452	2014 WW_{57}	—	November 17, 2014	Mount Lemmon	Mount Lemmon Survey	EOS	1.6 km	MPC · JPL
767453	2014 WP_{59}	—	January 2, 2012	Kitt Peak	Spacewatch	·	450 m	MPC · JPL
767454	2014 WU_{59}	—	November 17, 2014	Haleakala	Pan-STARRS 1	EOS	1.2 km	MPC · JPL
767455	2014 WS_{62}	—	September 15, 2010	Mount Lemmon	Mount Lemmon Survey	·	840 m	MPC · JPL
767456	2014 WC_{65}	—	November 17, 2014	Haleakala	Pan-STARRS 1	·	1.6 km	MPC · JPL
767457	2014 WV_{65}	—	January 2, 2012	Mount Lemmon	Mount Lemmon Survey	·	440 m	MPC · JPL
767458	2014 WZ_{70}	—	January 28, 2011	Mount Lemmon	Mount Lemmon Survey	KOR	1.0 km	MPC · JPL
767459	2014 WS_{71}	—	October 3, 2014	Mount Lemmon	Mount Lemmon Survey	·	590 m	MPC · JPL
767460	2014 WM_{74}	—	October 22, 2014	Mount Lemmon	Mount Lemmon Survey	·	1.6 km	MPC · JPL
767461	2014 WO_{76}	—	November 17, 2014	Mount Lemmon	Mount Lemmon Survey	·	1.6 km	MPC · JPL
767462	2014 WB_{81}	—	April 19, 2012	Kitt Peak	Spacewatch	·	1.6 km	MPC · JPL
767463	2014 WJ_{84}	—	November 17, 2014	Mount Lemmon	Mount Lemmon Survey	·	2.3 km	MPC · JPL
767464	2014 WG_{87}	—	October 25, 2014	Haleakala	Pan-STARRS 1	·	1.6 km	MPC · JPL
767465	2014 WQ_{90}	—	March 6, 2011	Mount Lemmon	Mount Lemmon Survey	·	2.2 km	MPC · JPL
767466	2014 WG_{91}	—	May 10, 2007	Mount Lemmon	Mount Lemmon Survey	·	1.5 km	MPC · JPL
767467	2014 WW_{91}	—	October 22, 2003	Kitt Peak	Spacewatch	·	1.8 km	MPC · JPL
767468	2014 WP_{94}	—	April 9, 2010	Kitt Peak	Spacewatch	·	510 m	MPC · JPL
767469	2014 WB_{95}	—	November 17, 2014	Mount Lemmon	Mount Lemmon Survey	·	1.7 km	MPC · JPL
767470	2014 WY_{95}	—	July 1, 2008	Kitt Peak	Spacewatch	·	1.4 km	MPC · JPL
767471	2014 WV_{96}	—	November 17, 2014	Mount Lemmon	Mount Lemmon Survey	·	1.4 km	MPC · JPL
767472	2014 WM_{97}	—	September 11, 2007	Mount Lemmon	Mount Lemmon Survey	·	420 m	MPC · JPL
767473	2014 WT_{98}	—	March 19, 2013	Haleakala	Pan-STARRS 1	·	610 m	MPC · JPL
767474	2014 WB_{99}	—	February 27, 2012	Kitt Peak	Spacewatch	·	870 m	MPC · JPL
767475	2014 WD_{100}	—	November 17, 2014	Mount Lemmon	Mount Lemmon Survey	·	1.5 km	MPC · JPL
767476	2014 WE_{100}	—	February 4, 2009	Mount Lemmon	Mount Lemmon Survey	·	460 m	MPC · JPL
767477	2014 WD_{101}	—	November 17, 2014	Mount Lemmon	Mount Lemmon Survey	·	2.0 km	MPC · JPL
767478	2014 WN_{101}	—	November 17, 2014	Mount Lemmon	Mount Lemmon Survey	·	1.9 km	MPC · JPL
767479	2014 WU_{108}	—	October 25, 2014	Haleakala	Pan-STARRS 1	·	1.3 km	MPC · JPL
767480	2014 WC_{109}	—	November 18, 2014	Haleakala	Pan-STARRS 1	·	1.4 km	MPC · JPL
767481	2014 WE_{112}	—	August 31, 2014	Haleakala	Pan-STARRS 1	BRA	1.4 km	MPC · JPL
767482	2014 WM_{113}	—	September 30, 2014	Catalina	CSS	EUN	1.1 km	MPC · JPL
767483	2014 WZ_{118}	—	November 20, 2014	Mount Lemmon	Mount Lemmon Survey	·	2.0 km	MPC · JPL
767484	2014 WT_{126}	—	November 16, 2014	Mount Lemmon	Mount Lemmon Survey	·	2.0 km	MPC · JPL
767485	2014 WL_{133}	—	November 17, 2014	Haleakala	Pan-STARRS 1	·	2.3 km	MPC · JPL
767486	2014 WP_{134}	—	October 23, 2014	Kitt Peak	Spacewatch	·	2.0 km	MPC · JPL
767487	2014 WV_{135}	—	October 20, 2014	Kitt Peak	Spacewatch	EOS	1.2 km	MPC · JPL
767488	2014 WX_{135}	—	November 17, 2014	Haleakala	Pan-STARRS 1	·	1.3 km	MPC · JPL
767489	2014 WU_{136}	—	October 20, 2008	Mount Lemmon	Mount Lemmon Survey	THM	1.8 km	MPC · JPL
767490	2014 WK_{142}	—	November 17, 2014	Haleakala	Pan-STARRS 1	TIN	1.1 km	MPC · JPL
767491	2014 WU_{148}	—	November 17, 2014	Haleakala	Pan-STARRS 1	·	1.9 km	MPC · JPL
767492	2014 WO_{149}	—	October 25, 2014	Mount Lemmon	Mount Lemmon Survey	·	460 m	MPC · JPL
767493	2014 WQ_{149}	—	December 31, 2011	Mount Lemmon	Mount Lemmon Survey	V	370 m	MPC · JPL
767494	2014 WO_{152}	—	October 15, 2014	Kitt Peak	Spacewatch	·	590 m	MPC · JPL
767495	2014 WF_{153}	—	October 15, 2014	Kitt Peak	Spacewatch	KOR	950 m	MPC · JPL
767496	2014 WS_{153}	—	November 10, 2009	Kitt Peak	Spacewatch	EOS	1.2 km	MPC · JPL
767497	2014 WX_{154}	—	October 27, 2009	Kitt Peak	Spacewatch	·	1.4 km	MPC · JPL
767498	2014 WJ_{156}	—	February 8, 2011	Mount Lemmon	Mount Lemmon Survey	MRX	760 m	MPC · JPL
767499	2014 WW_{162}	—	October 20, 2014	Mount Lemmon	Mount Lemmon Survey	·	2.1 km	MPC · JPL
767500	2014 WC_{165}	—	January 1, 2008	Kitt Peak	Spacewatch	·	840 m	MPC · JPL

== 767501–767600 ==
back to top

Designation			Discovery			Properties		Ref
Permanent	Provisional	Named after	Date	Site	Discoverer(s)	Category	Diam.	Ref
767501	2014 WB_{171}	—	August 31, 2014	Haleakala	Pan-STARRS 1	·	1.5 km	MPC · JPL
767502	2014 WO_{177}	—	October 5, 2014	Kitt Peak	Spacewatch	·	1.4 km	MPC · JPL
767503	2014 WR_{177}	—	November 12, 2005	Kitt Peak	Spacewatch	·	1.5 km	MPC · JPL
767504	2014 WU_{181}	—	August 25, 2014	Haleakala	Pan-STARRS 1	·	530 m	MPC · JPL
767505	2014 WX_{181}	—	December 25, 2011	Kitt Peak	Spacewatch	·	550 m	MPC · JPL
767506	2014 WD_{183}	—	May 16, 2013	Mount Lemmon	Mount Lemmon Survey	·	1.7 km	MPC · JPL
767507	2014 WL_{184}	—	October 8, 2007	Catalina	CSS	·	530 m	MPC · JPL
767508	2014 WV_{185}	—	November 20, 2014	Mount Lemmon	Mount Lemmon Survey	·	2.1 km	MPC · JPL
767509	2014 WS_{186}	—	September 18, 1995	Kitt Peak	Spacewatch	·	1.4 km	MPC · JPL
767510	2014 WB_{188}	—	November 20, 2014	Haleakala	Pan-STARRS 1	·	1.6 km	MPC · JPL
767511	2014 WD_{191}	—	November 20, 2014	Haleakala	Pan-STARRS 1	EOS	1.3 km	MPC · JPL
767512	2014 WV_{193}	—	November 21, 2014	Mount Lemmon	Mount Lemmon Survey	·	550 m	MPC · JPL
767513	2014 WA_{194}	—	November 21, 2014	Mount Lemmon	Mount Lemmon Survey	·	1.5 km	MPC · JPL
767514	2014 WH_{195}	—	November 21, 2014	Mount Lemmon	Mount Lemmon Survey	·	2.4 km	MPC · JPL
767515	2014 WJ_{198}	—	November 21, 2014	Haleakala	Pan-STARRS 1	·	920 m	MPC · JPL
767516	2014 WM_{198}	—	November 21, 2014	Haleakala	Pan-STARRS 1	·	1.7 km	MPC · JPL
767517	2014 WP_{198}	—	May 17, 2012	Bergisch Gladbach	W. Bickel	·	2.6 km	MPC · JPL
767518	2014 WS_{204}	—	April 27, 2012	Haleakala	Pan-STARRS 1	EOS	1.4 km	MPC · JPL
767519	2014 WD_{208}	—	December 18, 2009	Mount Lemmon	Mount Lemmon Survey	THM	1.7 km	MPC · JPL
767520	2014 WX_{208}	—	November 17, 2014	Haleakala	Pan-STARRS 1	·	2.1 km	MPC · JPL
767521	2014 WN_{210}	—	November 17, 2014	Haleakala	Pan-STARRS 1	EOS	1.3 km	MPC · JPL
767522	2014 WX_{210}	—	November 17, 2014	Haleakala	Pan-STARRS 1	·	500 m	MPC · JPL
767523	2014 WA_{211}	—	November 17, 2014	Haleakala	Pan-STARRS 1	·	460 m	MPC · JPL
767524	2014 WB_{213}	—	January 31, 2006	Kitt Peak	Spacewatch	·	1.1 km	MPC · JPL
767525	2014 WK_{213}	—	January 30, 2011	Kitt Peak	Spacewatch	·	1.5 km	MPC · JPL
767526	2014 WF_{216}	—	October 20, 2003	Kitt Peak	Spacewatch	·	1.8 km	MPC · JPL
767527	2014 WU_{216}	—	October 25, 2014	Haleakala	Pan-STARRS 1	·	530 m	MPC · JPL
767528	2014 WN_{219}	—	November 17, 2014	Mount Lemmon	Mount Lemmon Survey	L5	8.8 km	MPC · JPL
767529	2014 WG_{220}	—	November 13, 2014	Kitt Peak	Spacewatch	·	460 m	MPC · JPL
767530	2014 WM_{221}	—	September 14, 2013	Haleakala	Pan-STARRS 1	L5	6.1 km	MPC · JPL
767531	2014 WY_{221}	—	November 18, 2014	Haleakala	Pan-STARRS 1	·	490 m	MPC · JPL
767532	2014 WE_{224}	—	November 18, 2014	Haleakala	Pan-STARRS 1	·	1.6 km	MPC · JPL
767533	2014 WU_{227}	—	November 18, 2014	Haleakala	Pan-STARRS 1	TRE	1.8 km	MPC · JPL
767534	2014 WA_{228}	—	July 16, 2013	Haleakala	Pan-STARRS 1	EOS	1.1 km	MPC · JPL
767535	2014 WG_{229}	—	October 25, 2014	Haleakala	Pan-STARRS 1	·	510 m	MPC · JPL
767536	2014 WR_{229}	—	March 31, 2013	Mount Lemmon	Mount Lemmon Survey	·	500 m	MPC · JPL
767537	2014 WU_{233}	—	November 20, 2014	Kitt Peak	Spacewatch	·	540 m	MPC · JPL
767538	2014 WP_{236}	—	March 5, 2006	Kitt Peak	Spacewatch	·	610 m	MPC · JPL
767539	2014 WJ_{241}	—	August 9, 2013	Haleakala	Pan-STARRS 1	EOS	1.4 km	MPC · JPL
767540	2014 WP_{251}	—	September 24, 2014	Catalina	CSS	·	1.7 km	MPC · JPL
767541	2014 WB_{253}	—	August 31, 2014	Haleakala	Pan-STARRS 1	·	540 m	MPC · JPL
767542	2014 WJ_{254}	—	November 21, 2014	Haleakala	Pan-STARRS 1	·	1.6 km	MPC · JPL
767543	2014 WF_{255}	—	November 21, 2014	Haleakala	Pan-STARRS 1	·	1.5 km	MPC · JPL
767544	2014 WX_{258}	—	February 15, 2010	Kitt Peak	Spacewatch	HYG	1.9 km	MPC · JPL
767545	2014 WP_{259}	—	October 18, 2014	Mount Lemmon	Mount Lemmon Survey	·	1.5 km	MPC · JPL
767546	2014 WZ_{259}	—	October 17, 2009	Mount Lemmon	Mount Lemmon Survey	·	1.5 km	MPC · JPL
767547	2014 WA_{260}	—	November 21, 2014	Haleakala	Pan-STARRS 1	·	1.4 km	MPC · JPL
767548	2014 WN_{261}	—	September 20, 2014	Haleakala	Pan-STARRS 1	·	2.7 km	MPC · JPL
767549	2014 WR_{267}	—	November 21, 2014	Haleakala	Pan-STARRS 1	·	1.9 km	MPC · JPL
767550	2014 WY_{268}	—	November 21, 2014	Haleakala	Pan-STARRS 1	EOS	1.3 km	MPC · JPL
767551	2014 WC_{269}	—	November 21, 2014	Haleakala	Pan-STARRS 1	·	1.4 km	MPC · JPL
767552	2014 WF_{271}	—	September 4, 2014	Haleakala	Pan-STARRS 1	·	550 m	MPC · JPL
767553	2014 WK_{271}	—	November 21, 2014	Haleakala	Pan-STARRS 1	·	680 m	MPC · JPL
767554	2014 WE_{272}	—	November 21, 2014	Haleakala	Pan-STARRS 1	·	1.5 km	MPC · JPL
767555	2014 WM_{276}	—	November 21, 2014	Haleakala	Pan-STARRS 1	L5	6.2 km	MPC · JPL
767556	2014 WX_{279}	—	September 18, 2007	Mount Lemmon	Mount Lemmon Survey	·	490 m	MPC · JPL
767557	2014 WR_{282}	—	November 21, 2014	Haleakala	Pan-STARRS 1	·	1.6 km	MPC · JPL
767558	2014 WE_{283}	—	May 21, 2012	Haleakala	Pan-STARRS 1	·	1.5 km	MPC · JPL
767559	2014 WO_{285}	—	September 20, 2014	Haleakala	Pan-STARRS 1	·	1.7 km	MPC · JPL
767560	2014 WV_{285}	—	November 1, 2013	Mount Lemmon	Mount Lemmon Survey	L5	5.4 km	MPC · JPL
767561	2014 WR_{286}	—	September 4, 2014	Haleakala	Pan-STARRS 1	BRA	1.2 km	MPC · JPL
767562	2014 WC_{287}	—	November 18, 2014	Mount Lemmon	Mount Lemmon Survey	·	1.3 km	MPC · JPL
767563	2014 WG_{291}	—	September 20, 2014	Haleakala	Pan-STARRS 1	·	3.0 km	MPC · JPL
767564	2014 WR_{291}	—	September 28, 2008	Mount Lemmon	Mount Lemmon Survey	EOS	1.4 km	MPC · JPL
767565	2014 WW_{294}	—	November 21, 2014	Haleakala	Pan-STARRS 1	·	3.0 km	MPC · JPL
767566	2014 WR_{296}	—	September 20, 2014	Haleakala	Pan-STARRS 1	EOS	1.5 km	MPC · JPL
767567	2014 WY_{296}	—	August 9, 2013	Haleakala	Pan-STARRS 1	·	1.5 km	MPC · JPL
767568	2014 WJ_{297}	—	July 14, 2013	Haleakala	Pan-STARRS 1	·	1.4 km	MPC · JPL
767569	2014 WT_{299}	—	January 27, 2011	Mount Lemmon	Mount Lemmon Survey	·	1.5 km	MPC · JPL
767570	2014 WZ_{302}	—	October 4, 2014	Mount Lemmon	Mount Lemmon Survey	EOS	1.3 km	MPC · JPL
767571	2014 WO_{310}	—	November 22, 2014	Mount Lemmon	Mount Lemmon Survey	·	500 m	MPC · JPL
767572	2014 WM_{312}	—	November 8, 2010	Kitt Peak	Spacewatch	·	1.7 km	MPC · JPL
767573	2014 WU_{313}	—	August 30, 2014	Haleakala	Pan-STARRS 1	·	1.6 km	MPC · JPL
767574	2014 WD_{316}	—	March 11, 2008	Catalina	CSS	·	2.1 km	MPC · JPL
767575	2014 WC_{317}	—	August 23, 2014	Haleakala	Pan-STARRS 1	EOS	1.5 km	MPC · JPL
767576	2014 WD_{321}	—	November 12, 2014	Haleakala	Pan-STARRS 1	·	510 m	MPC · JPL
767577	2014 WR_{323}	—	October 29, 2014	Haleakala	Pan-STARRS 1	·	1.5 km	MPC · JPL
767578	2014 WK_{326}	—	October 29, 2014	Haleakala	Pan-STARRS 1	·	2.1 km	MPC · JPL
767579	2014 WX_{326}	—	April 21, 2012	Kitt Peak	Spacewatch	·	1.6 km	MPC · JPL
767580	2014 WG_{328}	—	October 29, 2014	Haleakala	Pan-STARRS 1	·	2.3 km	MPC · JPL
767581	2014 WK_{328}	—	November 22, 2014	Haleakala	Pan-STARRS 1	·	2.4 km	MPC · JPL
767582	2014 WM_{332}	—	October 29, 2014	Haleakala	Pan-STARRS 1	EOS	1.3 km	MPC · JPL
767583	2014 WR_{334}	—	January 16, 2011	Mount Lemmon	Mount Lemmon Survey	·	1.7 km	MPC · JPL
767584	2014 WT_{334}	—	November 22, 2014	Haleakala	Pan-STARRS 1	EOS	1.3 km	MPC · JPL
767585	2014 WF_{335}	—	November 22, 2014	Haleakala	Pan-STARRS 1	·	1.8 km	MPC · JPL
767586	2014 WL_{337}	—	November 22, 2014	Haleakala	Pan-STARRS 1	·	1.5 km	MPC · JPL
767587	2014 WF_{338}	—	November 22, 2014	Haleakala	Pan-STARRS 1	BRA	1.2 km	MPC · JPL
767588	2014 WS_{340}	—	August 8, 2013	Haleakala	Pan-STARRS 1	EOS	1.2 km	MPC · JPL
767589	2014 WK_{342}	—	October 29, 2014	Haleakala	Pan-STARRS 1	EOS	1.2 km	MPC · JPL
767590	2014 WX_{344}	—	June 7, 2013	Haleakala	Pan-STARRS 1	·	1.3 km	MPC · JPL
767591	2014 WF_{345}	—	September 6, 2014	Mount Lemmon	Mount Lemmon Survey	·	540 m	MPC · JPL
767592	2014 WC_{347}	—	October 30, 2014	Mount Lemmon	Mount Lemmon Survey	·	1.7 km	MPC · JPL
767593	2014 WZ_{349}	—	August 4, 2013	Haleakala	Pan-STARRS 1	·	1.9 km	MPC · JPL
767594	2014 WO_{352}	—	November 23, 2014	Mount Lemmon	Mount Lemmon Survey	EOS	1.3 km	MPC · JPL
767595	2014 WS_{354}	—	November 23, 2014	Haleakala	Pan-STARRS 1	·	2.1 km	MPC · JPL
767596	2014 WE_{356}	—	December 2, 2005	Kitt Peak	Spacewatch	·	1.6 km	MPC · JPL
767597	2014 WF_{357}	—	September 17, 2009	Kitt Peak	Spacewatch	·	1.2 km	MPC · JPL
767598	2014 WM_{357}	—	October 26, 2014	Mount Lemmon	Mount Lemmon Survey	·	610 m	MPC · JPL
767599	2014 WQ_{359}	—	January 23, 2011	Mount Lemmon	Mount Lemmon Survey	·	1.7 km	MPC · JPL
767600	2014 WJ_{360}	—	August 12, 2013	Haleakala	Pan-STARRS 1	VER	2.0 km	MPC · JPL

== 767601–767700 ==
back to top

Designation			Discovery			Properties		Ref
Permanent	Provisional	Named after	Date	Site	Discoverer(s)	Category	Diam.	Ref
767601	2014 WZ_{374}	—	January 26, 2012	Mount Lemmon	Mount Lemmon Survey	·	410 m	MPC · JPL
767602	2014 WZ_{375}	—	July 13, 2013	Haleakala	Pan-STARRS 1	·	1.3 km	MPC · JPL
767603	2014 WJ_{376}	—	November 14, 2014	Kitt Peak	Spacewatch	·	450 m	MPC · JPL
767604	2014 WA_{377}	—	November 22, 2014	Mount Lemmon	Mount Lemmon Survey	L5	6.8 km	MPC · JPL
767605	2014 WS_{379}	—	November 22, 2014	Haleakala	Pan-STARRS 1	·	1.5 km	MPC · JPL
767606	2014 WC_{386}	—	October 4, 2013	Mount Lemmon	Mount Lemmon Survey	L5	6.5 km	MPC · JPL
767607	2014 WU_{388}	—	October 26, 2014	Haleakala	Pan-STARRS 1	·	2.2 km	MPC · JPL
767608	2014 WH_{391}	—	November 24, 2014	Mount Lemmon	Mount Lemmon Survey	·	560 m	MPC · JPL
767609	2014 WG_{392}	—	July 13, 2013	Haleakala	Pan-STARRS 1	·	2.2 km	MPC · JPL
767610	2014 WH_{396}	—	October 30, 2014	Mount Lemmon	Mount Lemmon Survey	·	2.6 km	MPC · JPL
767611	2014 WR_{403}	—	November 26, 2014	Kitt Peak	Spacewatch	·	1.2 km	MPC · JPL
767612	2014 WP_{405}	—	October 22, 2014	Mount Lemmon	Mount Lemmon Survey	L5	9.2 km	MPC · JPL
767613	2014 WF_{412}	—	November 26, 2014	Haleakala	Pan-STARRS 1	·	1.6 km	MPC · JPL
767614	2014 WM_{414}	—	November 26, 2014	Haleakala	Pan-STARRS 1	V	440 m	MPC · JPL
767615	2014 WP_{414}	—	November 18, 2014	Mount Lemmon	Mount Lemmon Survey	·	2.1 km	MPC · JPL
767616	2014 WK_{417}	—	November 26, 2014	Haleakala	Pan-STARRS 1	·	1.7 km	MPC · JPL
767617	2014 WK_{420}	—	November 26, 2014	Haleakala	Pan-STARRS 1	·	1.6 km	MPC · JPL
767618	2014 WE_{422}	—	November 26, 2014	Haleakala	Pan-STARRS 1	·	1.7 km	MPC · JPL
767619	2014 WM_{422}	—	April 17, 2013	Haleakala	Pan-STARRS 1	·	500 m	MPC · JPL
767620	2014 WJ_{424}	—	November 3, 2007	Kitt Peak	Spacewatch	·	460 m	MPC · JPL
767621	2014 WB_{427}	—	October 23, 2014	Mount Lemmon	Mount Lemmon Survey	·	2.6 km	MPC · JPL
767622	2014 WN_{432}	—	November 27, 2014	Mount Lemmon	Mount Lemmon Survey	EOS	1.3 km	MPC · JPL
767623	2014 WZ_{432}	—	November 19, 2009	Mount Lemmon	Mount Lemmon Survey	HOF	1.9 km	MPC · JPL
767624	2014 WL_{433}	—	November 17, 2014	Haleakala	Pan-STARRS 1	·	1.5 km	MPC · JPL
767625	2014 WY_{435}	—	February 21, 2012	Mount Lemmon	Mount Lemmon Survey	ERI	1.0 km	MPC · JPL
767626	2014 WD_{436}	—	November 24, 2014	Mount Lemmon	Mount Lemmon Survey	·	590 m	MPC · JPL
767627	2014 WP_{438}	—	November 17, 2014	Haleakala	Pan-STARRS 1	·	2.0 km	MPC · JPL
767628	2014 WA_{442}	—	October 8, 2008	Kitt Peak	Spacewatch	·	1.9 km	MPC · JPL
767629	2014 WV_{444}	—	November 27, 2014	Haleakala	Pan-STARRS 1	·	2.2 km	MPC · JPL
767630	2014 WN_{445}	—	March 17, 2012	Mount Lemmon	Mount Lemmon Survey	·	690 m	MPC · JPL
767631	2014 WO_{446}	—	November 27, 2014	Haleakala	Pan-STARRS 1	·	1.5 km	MPC · JPL
767632	2014 WX_{447}	—	November 27, 2014	Haleakala	Pan-STARRS 1	·	1.5 km	MPC · JPL
767633	2014 WP_{450}	—	November 22, 2014	Mount Lemmon	Mount Lemmon Survey	·	590 m	MPC · JPL
767634	2014 WP_{451}	—	November 21, 2014	Mount Lemmon	Mount Lemmon Survey	·	1.8 km	MPC · JPL
767635	2014 WL_{453}	—	November 27, 2014	Mount Lemmon	Mount Lemmon Survey	EOS	1.7 km	MPC · JPL
767636	2014 WV_{457}	—	November 17, 2014	Haleakala	Pan-STARRS 1	WIT	730 m	MPC · JPL
767637	2014 WY_{458}	—	November 19, 2014	Haleakala	Pan-STARRS 1	·	510 m	MPC · JPL
767638	2014 WP_{459}	—	October 24, 2009	Kitt Peak	Spacewatch	KOR	1.1 km	MPC · JPL
767639	2014 WF_{463}	—	November 27, 2014	Haleakala	Pan-STARRS 1	L5	7.4 km	MPC · JPL
767640	2014 WG_{463}	—	November 17, 2014	Haleakala	Pan-STARRS 1	·	1.3 km	MPC · JPL
767641	2014 WT_{469}	—	November 27, 2014	Haleakala	Pan-STARRS 1	·	2.0 km	MPC · JPL
767642	2014 WA_{470}	—	February 13, 2012	Haleakala	Pan-STARRS 1	·	460 m	MPC · JPL
767643	2014 WF_{474}	—	November 11, 2009	Mount Lemmon	Mount Lemmon Survey	·	1.7 km	MPC · JPL
767644	2014 WX_{475}	—	October 21, 2008	Mount Lemmon	Mount Lemmon Survey	·	2.8 km	MPC · JPL
767645	2014 WC_{476}	—	November 17, 2014	Haleakala	Pan-STARRS 1	·	1.3 km	MPC · JPL
767646	2014 WQ_{476}	—	November 26, 2014	Haleakala	Pan-STARRS 1	·	1.5 km	MPC · JPL
767647	2014 WC_{483}	—	August 31, 2014	Haleakala	Pan-STARRS 1	·	430 m	MPC · JPL
767648	2014 WF_{485}	—	November 28, 2014	Mount Lemmon	Mount Lemmon Survey	·	1.6 km	MPC · JPL
767649	2014 WL_{485}	—	November 23, 2014	Haleakala	Pan-STARRS 1	EOS	1.4 km	MPC · JPL
767650	2014 WO_{488}	—	October 28, 2008	Kitt Peak	Spacewatch	·	2.0 km	MPC · JPL
767651	2014 WX_{488}	—	September 18, 2003	Kitt Peak	Spacewatch	·	1.4 km	MPC · JPL
767652	2014 WG_{489}	—	November 30, 2014	Mount Lemmon	Mount Lemmon Survey	ARM	2.7 km	MPC · JPL
767653	2014 WO_{489}	—	January 27, 2011	Mount Lemmon	Mount Lemmon Survey	·	1.5 km	MPC · JPL
767654	2014 WD_{491}	—	July 14, 2013	Haleakala	Pan-STARRS 1	BRA	1.1 km	MPC · JPL
767655	2014 WD_{496}	—	November 30, 2014	Haleakala	Pan-STARRS 1	·	2.3 km	MPC · JPL
767656	2014 WM_{505}	—	November 18, 2014	Haleakala	Pan-STARRS 1	PHO	1.2 km	MPC · JPL
767657	2014 WO_{511}	—	November 26, 2014	Haleakala	Pan-STARRS 1	L5	8.0 km	MPC · JPL
767658	2014 WA_{512}	—	November 17, 2014	Haleakala	Pan-STARRS 1	H	310 m	MPC · JPL
767659	2014 WJ_{512}	—	November 26, 2014	Haleakala	Pan-STARRS 1	H	320 m	MPC · JPL
767660	2014 WA_{518}	—	October 10, 2007	Mount Lemmon	Mount Lemmon Survey	·	520 m	MPC · JPL
767661	2014 WA_{519}	—	August 7, 2008	Kitt Peak	Spacewatch	·	1.6 km	MPC · JPL
767662	2014 WA_{520}	—	October 29, 2008	Mount Lemmon	Mount Lemmon Survey	EOS	1.5 km	MPC · JPL
767663	2014 WQ_{520}	—	November 17, 2014	Haleakala	Pan-STARRS 1	·	1.3 km	MPC · JPL
767664	2014 WD_{521}	—	November 17, 2014	Haleakala	Pan-STARRS 1	·	1.7 km	MPC · JPL
767665	2014 WO_{521}	—	October 15, 2001	Kitt Peak	Spacewatch	·	930 m	MPC · JPL
767666	2014 WP_{523}	—	November 17, 2014	Haleakala	Pan-STARRS 1	·	1.3 km	MPC · JPL
767667	2014 WR_{523}	—	October 27, 2008	Mount Lemmon	Mount Lemmon Survey	THM	2.0 km	MPC · JPL
767668	2014 WY_{524}	—	November 20, 2014	Mount Lemmon	Mount Lemmon Survey	·	1.9 km	MPC · JPL
767669	2014 WO_{526}	—	November 21, 2014	Haleakala	Pan-STARRS 1	·	1.7 km	MPC · JPL
767670	2014 WQ_{526}	—	July 14, 2013	Haleakala	Pan-STARRS 1	·	2.1 km	MPC · JPL
767671	2014 WZ_{526}	—	November 21, 2014	Haleakala	Pan-STARRS 1	·	1.9 km	MPC · JPL
767672	2014 WJ_{528}	—	October 26, 2009	Kitt Peak	Spacewatch	·	1.5 km	MPC · JPL
767673	2014 WW_{528}	—	November 22, 2014	Haleakala	Pan-STARRS 1	·	1.6 km	MPC · JPL
767674	2014 WW_{530}	—	November 26, 2014	Haleakala	Pan-STARRS 1	·	1.6 km	MPC · JPL
767675	2014 WN_{531}	—	November 26, 2014	Haleakala	Pan-STARRS 1	·	2.2 km	MPC · JPL
767676	2014 WS_{531}	—	November 26, 2014	Haleakala	Pan-STARRS 1	·	1.8 km	MPC · JPL
767677	2014 WK_{532}	—	November 27, 2014	Haleakala	Pan-STARRS 1	·	740 m	MPC · JPL
767678	2014 WU_{536}	—	February 11, 2016	Haleakala	Pan-STARRS 1	·	630 m	MPC · JPL
767679	2014 WZ_{536}	—	February 4, 2016	Haleakala	Pan-STARRS 1	·	2.3 km	MPC · JPL
767680	2014 WH_{537}	—	November 17, 2014	Haleakala	Pan-STARRS 1	·	2.9 km	MPC · JPL
767681	2014 WH_{538}	—	February 5, 2016	Haleakala	Pan-STARRS 1	VER	2.3 km	MPC · JPL
767682	2014 WR_{538}	—	November 22, 2014	Mount Lemmon	Mount Lemmon Survey	·	520 m	MPC · JPL
767683	2014 WX_{540}	—	November 29, 2014	Haleakala	Pan-STARRS 1	T_{j} (2.93)	3.3 km	MPC · JPL
767684	2014 WL_{541}	—	November 26, 2014	Haleakala	Pan-STARRS 1	EOS	1.3 km	MPC · JPL
767685	2014 WG_{542}	—	November 21, 2014	Haleakala	Pan-STARRS 1	·	1.7 km	MPC · JPL
767686	2014 WZ_{544}	—	September 28, 2003	Kitt Peak	Spacewatch	·	1.6 km	MPC · JPL
767687	2014 WR_{545}	—	November 21, 2014	Haleakala	Pan-STARRS 1	·	1.7 km	MPC · JPL
767688	2014 WT_{545}	—	November 22, 2014	Haleakala	Pan-STARRS 1	·	1.4 km	MPC · JPL
767689	2014 WJ_{547}	—	January 3, 2016	Haleakala	Pan-STARRS 1	·	2.2 km	MPC · JPL
767690	2014 WN_{548}	—	January 18, 2016	Haleakala	Pan-STARRS 1	EOS	1.5 km	MPC · JPL
767691	2014 WO_{548}	—	November 26, 2014	Haleakala	Pan-STARRS 1	·	3.1 km	MPC · JPL
767692	2014 WS_{548}	—	November 20, 2014	Haleakala	Pan-STARRS 1	·	690 m	MPC · JPL
767693	2014 WF_{549}	—	November 26, 2014	Haleakala	Pan-STARRS 1	·	410 m	MPC · JPL
767694	2014 WU_{552}	—	November 27, 2014	Mount Lemmon	Mount Lemmon Survey	·	510 m	MPC · JPL
767695	2014 WK_{556}	—	January 9, 2016	Haleakala	Pan-STARRS 1	·	1.7 km	MPC · JPL
767696	2014 WM_{556}	—	November 26, 2014	Haleakala	Pan-STARRS 1	L5	7.4 km	MPC · JPL
767697	2014 WW_{556}	—	June 17, 2018	Haleakala	Pan-STARRS 1	·	1.6 km	MPC · JPL
767698	2014 WB_{557}	—	November 27, 2014	Mount Lemmon	Mount Lemmon Survey	·	590 m	MPC · JPL
767699	2014 WS_{558}	—	November 19, 2014	Mount Lemmon	Mount Lemmon Survey	EOS	1.5 km	MPC · JPL
767700	2014 WJ_{559}	—	November 20, 2014	Haleakala	Pan-STARRS 1	BRA	1.0 km	MPC · JPL

== 767701–767800 ==
back to top

Designation			Discovery			Properties		Ref
Permanent	Provisional	Named after	Date	Site	Discoverer(s)	Category	Diam.	Ref
767701	2014 WW_{561}	—	June 18, 2018	Haleakala	Pan-STARRS 1	·	1.5 km	MPC · JPL
767702	2014 WA_{562}	—	November 19, 2014	Mount Lemmon	Mount Lemmon Survey	·	1.8 km	MPC · JPL
767703	2014 WT_{564}	—	November 26, 2014	Haleakala	Pan-STARRS 1	·	2.8 km	MPC · JPL
767704	2014 WJ_{565}	—	November 21, 2014	Mount Lemmon	Mount Lemmon Survey	·	1.7 km	MPC · JPL
767705	2014 WU_{566}	—	November 29, 2014	Haleakala	Pan-STARRS 1	·	480 m	MPC · JPL
767706	2014 WX_{566}	—	November 29, 2014	Mount Lemmon	Mount Lemmon Survey	·	1.9 km	MPC · JPL
767707	2014 WS_{567}	—	September 28, 2003	Kitt Peak	Spacewatch	·	1.3 km	MPC · JPL
767708	2014 WT_{567}	—	September 18, 2003	Kitt Peak	Spacewatch	·	1.5 km	MPC · JPL
767709	2014 WS_{568}	—	November 17, 2014	Haleakala	Pan-STARRS 1	·	460 m	MPC · JPL
767710	2014 WP_{569}	—	November 17, 2014	Haleakala	Pan-STARRS 1	KOR	1.1 km	MPC · JPL
767711	2014 WK_{570}	—	November 26, 2014	Haleakala	Pan-STARRS 1	·	1.6 km	MPC · JPL
767712	2014 WS_{570}	—	November 21, 2014	Haleakala	Pan-STARRS 1	·	1.6 km	MPC · JPL
767713	2014 WF_{571}	—	November 22, 2014	Mount Lemmon	Mount Lemmon Survey	EOS	1.2 km	MPC · JPL
767714	2014 WQ_{572}	—	November 18, 2014	Mount Lemmon	Mount Lemmon Survey	EOS	1.3 km	MPC · JPL
767715	2014 WW_{573}	—	November 21, 2014	Haleakala	Pan-STARRS 1	·	1.7 km	MPC · JPL
767716	2014 WO_{574}	—	November 21, 2014	Haleakala	Pan-STARRS 1	L5	8.0 km	MPC · JPL
767717	2014 WU_{574}	—	November 20, 2014	Mount Lemmon	Mount Lemmon Survey	EOS	1.4 km	MPC · JPL
767718	2014 WP_{575}	—	November 17, 2014	Haleakala	Pan-STARRS 1	·	2.1 km	MPC · JPL
767719	2014 WQ_{575}	—	November 17, 2014	Haleakala	Pan-STARRS 1	L5	6.5 km	MPC · JPL
767720	2014 WA_{576}	—	November 21, 2014	Haleakala	Pan-STARRS 1	BRA	1.0 km	MPC · JPL
767721	2014 WQ_{578}	—	November 21, 2014	Haleakala	Pan-STARRS 1	L5	6.8 km	MPC · JPL
767722	2014 WK_{579}	—	November 26, 2014	Haleakala	Pan-STARRS 1	EUN	1.0 km	MPC · JPL
767723	2014 WM_{579}	—	November 27, 2014	Haleakala	Pan-STARRS 1	·	490 m	MPC · JPL
767724	2014 WD_{580}	—	November 28, 2014	Mount Lemmon	Mount Lemmon Survey	·	540 m	MPC · JPL
767725	2014 WR_{581}	—	November 29, 2014	Mount Lemmon	Mount Lemmon Survey	·	1.5 km	MPC · JPL
767726	2014 WT_{581}	—	November 27, 2014	Haleakala	Pan-STARRS 1	EOS	1.2 km	MPC · JPL
767727	2014 WU_{581}	—	September 19, 1998	Apache Point	SDSS	EOS	1.2 km	MPC · JPL
767728	2014 WG_{582}	—	November 26, 2014	Haleakala	Pan-STARRS 1	·	2.0 km	MPC · JPL
767729	2014 WL_{583}	—	November 27, 2014	Haleakala	Pan-STARRS 1	·	1.7 km	MPC · JPL
767730	2014 WP_{583}	—	November 27, 2014	Haleakala	Pan-STARRS 1	·	1.7 km	MPC · JPL
767731	2014 WN_{584}	—	November 22, 2014	Haleakala	Pan-STARRS 1	L5	7.4 km	MPC · JPL
767732	2014 WV_{584}	—	November 16, 2014	Mount Lemmon	Mount Lemmon Survey	·	1.6 km	MPC · JPL
767733	2014 WC_{585}	—	November 17, 2014	Haleakala	Pan-STARRS 1	·	2.6 km	MPC · JPL
767734	2014 WS_{585}	—	November 17, 2014	Haleakala	Pan-STARRS 1	L5	6.1 km	MPC · JPL
767735	2014 WB_{589}	—	November 16, 2014	Mount Lemmon	Mount Lemmon Survey	·	1.6 km	MPC · JPL
767736	2014 WF_{589}	—	November 26, 2014	Haleakala	Pan-STARRS 1	L5	7.5 km	MPC · JPL
767737	2014 WO_{589}	—	November 21, 2014	Haleakala	Pan-STARRS 1	·	2.1 km	MPC · JPL
767738	2014 WC_{590}	—	November 19, 2014	Mount Lemmon	Mount Lemmon Survey	·	3.0 km	MPC · JPL
767739	2014 WK_{590}	—	November 21, 2014	Haleakala	Pan-STARRS 1	L5	7.1 km	MPC · JPL
767740	2014 WN_{591}	—	November 16, 2014	Mount Lemmon	Mount Lemmon Survey	·	1.4 km	MPC · JPL
767741	2014 WF_{592}	—	November 21, 2014	Haleakala	Pan-STARRS 1	·	1.3 km	MPC · JPL
767742	2014 WN_{593}	—	November 29, 2014	Mount Lemmon	Mount Lemmon Survey	L5	6.8 km	MPC · JPL
767743	2014 WE_{594}	—	November 26, 2014	Mount Lemmon	Mount Lemmon Survey	·	2.7 km	MPC · JPL
767744	2014 WO_{594}	—	January 26, 1998	Kitt Peak	Spacewatch	·	520 m	MPC · JPL
767745	2014 WM_{595}	—	November 29, 2014	Mount Lemmon	Mount Lemmon Survey	L5	8.5 km	MPC · JPL
767746	2014 WF_{599}	—	November 29, 2014	Mount Lemmon	Mount Lemmon Survey	·	1.2 km	MPC · JPL
767747	2014 WV_{600}	—	November 28, 2014	Mount Lemmon	Mount Lemmon Survey	L5	6.2 km	MPC · JPL
767748	2014 WK_{602}	—	November 17, 2014	Haleakala	Pan-STARRS 1	L5	6.6 km	MPC · JPL
767749	2014 WW_{606}	—	November 24, 2009	Kitt Peak	Spacewatch	·	1.2 km	MPC · JPL
767750	2014 WA_{610}	—	November 21, 2014	Haleakala	Pan-STARRS 1	EOS	1.4 km	MPC · JPL
767751	2014 WW_{615}	—	November 17, 2014	Haleakala	Pan-STARRS 1	·	1.3 km	MPC · JPL
767752	2014 XG_{12}	—	January 20, 2012	Kitt Peak	Spacewatch	·	520 m	MPC · JPL
767753	2014 XA_{14}	—	July 13, 2013	Haleakala	Pan-STARRS 1	·	610 m	MPC · JPL
767754	2014 XW_{15}	—	February 7, 2011	Mount Lemmon	Mount Lemmon Survey	AST	1.3 km	MPC · JPL
767755	2014 XN_{16}	—	February 3, 2012	Mount Lemmon	Mount Lemmon Survey	·	480 m	MPC · JPL
767756	2014 XW_{18}	—	December 17, 2009	Mount Lemmon	Mount Lemmon Survey	·	2.5 km	MPC · JPL
767757	2014 XB_{23}	—	November 26, 2014	Haleakala	Pan-STARRS 1	·	440 m	MPC · JPL
767758	2014 XJ_{24}	—	November 26, 2014	Haleakala	Pan-STARRS 1	V	470 m	MPC · JPL
767759	2014 XU_{26}	—	November 23, 2014	Haleakala	Pan-STARRS 1	·	1.8 km	MPC · JPL
767760	2014 XJ_{27}	—	November 29, 2014	Mount Lemmon	Mount Lemmon Survey	·	1.9 km	MPC · JPL
767761	2014 XZ_{27}	—	October 22, 2014	Mount Lemmon	Mount Lemmon Survey	·	2.9 km	MPC · JPL
767762	2014 XW_{29}	—	September 20, 2008	Mount Lemmon	Mount Lemmon Survey	·	1.5 km	MPC · JPL
767763	2014 XH_{30}	—	August 5, 2014	Haleakala	Pan-STARRS 1	·	3.0 km	MPC · JPL
767764	2014 XV_{31}	—	November 21, 2014	Haleakala	Pan-STARRS 1	H	360 m	MPC · JPL
767765	2014 XU_{42}	—	December 1, 2014	Haleakala	Pan-STARRS 1	·	2.4 km	MPC · JPL
767766	2014 XP_{44}	—	December 3, 2014	Haleakala	Pan-STARRS 1	·	2.3 km	MPC · JPL
767767	2014 XS_{44}	—	December 15, 2014	Mount Lemmon	Mount Lemmon Survey	·	1.8 km	MPC · JPL
767768	2014 XJ_{45}	—	December 11, 2014	Mount Lemmon	Mount Lemmon Survey	·	530 m	MPC · JPL
767769	2014 XY_{45}	—	December 11, 2014	Mount Lemmon	Mount Lemmon Survey	EOS	1.6 km	MPC · JPL
767770	2014 XJ_{46}	—	December 3, 2014	Haleakala	Pan-STARRS 1	EOS	1.6 km	MPC · JPL
767771	2014 XK_{46}	—	September 22, 2008	Kitt Peak	Spacewatch	·	2.0 km	MPC · JPL
767772	2014 XU_{46}	—	December 15, 2014	Mount Lemmon	Mount Lemmon Survey	·	1.5 km	MPC · JPL
767773	2014 XY_{46}	—	December 11, 2014	Haleakala	Pan-STARRS 1	·	1.3 km	MPC · JPL
767774	2014 XG_{48}	—	December 3, 2014	Haleakala	Pan-STARRS 1	L5	8.5 km	MPC · JPL
767775	2014 XY_{48}	—	January 18, 2016	Haleakala	Pan-STARRS 1	·	1.5 km	MPC · JPL
767776	2014 XJ_{49}	—	December 11, 2014	Mount Lemmon	Mount Lemmon Survey	·	1.3 km	MPC · JPL
767777	2014 XQ_{49}	—	December 11, 2014	Mount Lemmon	Mount Lemmon Survey	·	1.4 km	MPC · JPL
767778	2014 XT_{49}	—	December 15, 2014	Mount Lemmon	Mount Lemmon Survey	·	490 m	MPC · JPL
767779	2014 XN_{51}	—	December 13, 2014	Haleakala	Pan-STARRS 1	L5	6.7 km	MPC · JPL
767780	2014 XR_{51}	—	December 13, 2014	Haleakala	Pan-STARRS 1	L5	8.2 km	MPC · JPL
767781	2014 XG_{53}	—	December 1, 2014	Haleakala	Pan-STARRS 1	·	2.1 km	MPC · JPL
767782	2014 XP_{53}	—	December 1, 2014	Haleakala	Pan-STARRS 1	·	1.9 km	MPC · JPL
767783	2014 XU_{57}	—	November 27, 2014	Haleakala	Pan-STARRS 1	L5	6.7 km	MPC · JPL
767784	2014 YN_{22}	—	December 21, 2014	Haleakala	Pan-STARRS 1	·	1.9 km	MPC · JPL
767785	2014 YU_{22}	—	December 21, 2014	Haleakala	Pan-STARRS 1	EOS	1.4 km	MPC · JPL
767786	2014 YH_{26}	—	November 26, 2014	Haleakala	Pan-STARRS 1	BRA	1.1 km	MPC · JPL
767787	2014 YD_{28}	—	February 1, 2012	Kitt Peak	Spacewatch	·	630 m	MPC · JPL
767788	2014 YL_{29}	—	December 1, 2014	Kitt Peak	Spacewatch	·	1.2 km	MPC · JPL
767789	2014 YQ_{29}	—	December 24, 2014	Mount Lemmon	Mount Lemmon Survey	EOS	1.6 km	MPC · JPL
767790	2014 YU_{29}	—	September 2, 2008	Siding Spring	SSS	·	1.6 km	MPC · JPL
767791	2014 YY_{32}	—	December 15, 2014	Kitt Peak	Spacewatch	·	1.8 km	MPC · JPL
767792	2014 YJ_{34}	—	November 28, 2014	Mount Lemmon	Mount Lemmon Survey	·	510 m	MPC · JPL
767793	2014 YM_{36}	—	October 30, 2014	Mount Lemmon	Mount Lemmon Survey	·	2.6 km	MPC · JPL
767794	2014 YU_{36}	—	September 23, 2008	Mount Lemmon	Mount Lemmon Survey	EOS	1.1 km	MPC · JPL
767795	2014 YE_{43}	—	October 15, 2007	Mount Lemmon	Mount Lemmon Survey	·	450 m	MPC · JPL
767796	2014 YB_{52}	—	December 29, 2014	Haleakala	Pan-STARRS 1	H	520 m	MPC · JPL
767797	2014 YQ_{52}	—	December 21, 2014	Mount Lemmon	Mount Lemmon Survey	·	1.8 km	MPC · JPL
767798	2014 YW_{52}	—	December 21, 2014	Haleakala	Pan-STARRS 1	EOS	1.6 km	MPC · JPL
767799	2014 YZ_{52}	—	December 21, 2014	Haleakala	Pan-STARRS 1	·	2.0 km	MPC · JPL
767800	2014 YS_{53}	—	December 29, 2014	Mount Lemmon	Mount Lemmon Survey	·	1.5 km	MPC · JPL

== 767801–767900 ==
back to top

Designation			Discovery			Properties		Ref
Permanent	Provisional	Named after	Date	Site	Discoverer(s)	Category	Diam.	Ref
767801	2014 YR_{55}	—	December 18, 2014	Haleakala	Pan-STARRS 1	·	1.6 km	MPC · JPL
767802	2014 YT_{55}	—	October 10, 2008	Mount Lemmon	Mount Lemmon Survey	EOS	1.3 km	MPC · JPL
767803	2014 YB_{56}	—	September 14, 2013	Haleakala	Pan-STARRS 1	EOS	1.3 km	MPC · JPL
767804	2014 YR_{56}	—	December 29, 2014	Haleakala	Pan-STARRS 1	URS	2.6 km	MPC · JPL
767805	2014 YY_{56}	—	December 11, 2009	Mount Lemmon	Mount Lemmon Survey	·	1.5 km	MPC · JPL
767806	2014 YQ_{57}	—	December 27, 2014	Haleakala	Pan-STARRS 1	EOS	1.4 km	MPC · JPL
767807	2014 YB_{58}	—	December 18, 2014	Haleakala	Pan-STARRS 1	·	2.2 km	MPC · JPL
767808	2014 YC_{59}	—	December 21, 2014	Haleakala	Pan-STARRS 1	·	440 m	MPC · JPL
767809	2014 YE_{59}	—	December 21, 2014	Haleakala	Pan-STARRS 1	·	2.1 km	MPC · JPL
767810	2014 YX_{61}	—	October 3, 2013	Haleakala	Pan-STARRS 1	·	2.4 km	MPC · JPL
767811	2014 YQ_{62}	—	October 15, 2013	Mount Lemmon	Mount Lemmon Survey	·	2.6 km	MPC · JPL
767812	2014 YR_{62}	—	December 29, 2014	Haleakala	Pan-STARRS 1	·	1.3 km	MPC · JPL
767813	2014 YV_{62}	—	November 9, 2013	Mount Lemmon	Mount Lemmon Survey	EOS	1.5 km	MPC · JPL
767814	2014 YZ_{62}	—	December 29, 2014	Haleakala	Pan-STARRS 1	·	2.5 km	MPC · JPL
767815	2014 YT_{64}	—	December 26, 2014	Haleakala	Pan-STARRS 1	·	530 m	MPC · JPL
767816	2014 YV_{64}	—	December 21, 2014	Haleakala	Pan-STARRS 1	·	480 m	MPC · JPL
767817	2014 YE_{65}	—	December 29, 2014	Haleakala	Pan-STARRS 1	·	880 m	MPC · JPL
767818	2014 YJ_{65}	—	December 21, 2014	Haleakala	Pan-STARRS 1	PHO	800 m	MPC · JPL
767819	2014 YL_{65}	—	December 26, 2014	Haleakala	Pan-STARRS 1	·	560 m	MPC · JPL
767820	2014 YU_{65}	—	November 19, 2007	Kitt Peak	Spacewatch	·	380 m	MPC · JPL
767821	2014 YF_{68}	—	October 19, 2003	Kitt Peak	Spacewatch	·	1.5 km	MPC · JPL
767822	2014 YK_{68}	—	December 29, 2014	Mount Lemmon	Mount Lemmon Survey	·	1.9 km	MPC · JPL
767823	2014 YG_{69}	—	January 14, 2016	Haleakala	Pan-STARRS 1	TIR	2.6 km	MPC · JPL
767824	2014 YP_{69}	—	February 10, 2010	Kitt Peak	Spacewatch	·	1.8 km	MPC · JPL
767825	2014 YA_{71}	—	December 29, 2014	Haleakala	Pan-STARRS 1	·	2.4 km	MPC · JPL
767826	2014 YC_{74}	—	April 11, 2016	Haleakala	Pan-STARRS 1	WAT	1.8 km	MPC · JPL
767827	2014 YE_{74}	—	December 24, 2014	Mount Lemmon	Mount Lemmon Survey	·	1.5 km	MPC · JPL
767828 Conovici	2014 YL_{74}	Conovici	December 26, 2014	Roque de los Muchachos	EURONEAR	·	2.1 km	MPC · JPL
767829	2014 YR_{75}	—	December 18, 2014	Haleakala	Pan-STARRS 1	·	2.2 km	MPC · JPL
767830	2014 YS_{76}	—	December 29, 2014	Mount Lemmon	Mount Lemmon Survey	·	1.3 km	MPC · JPL
767831	2014 YG_{78}	—	December 23, 2014	Mount Lemmon	Mount Lemmon Survey	·	1.4 km	MPC · JPL
767832	2014 YK_{78}	—	December 21, 2014	Haleakala	Pan-STARRS 1	·	2.1 km	MPC · JPL
767833	2014 YD_{79}	—	December 29, 2014	Haleakala	Pan-STARRS 1	·	1.4 km	MPC · JPL
767834	2014 YO_{80}	—	December 21, 2014	Haleakala	Pan-STARRS 1	·	1.9 km	MPC · JPL
767835	2014 YT_{80}	—	December 26, 2014	Haleakala	Pan-STARRS 1	·	1.5 km	MPC · JPL
767836	2014 YO_{83}	—	December 24, 2014	Mount Lemmon	Mount Lemmon Survey	·	1.9 km	MPC · JPL
767837	2014 YH_{84}	—	December 29, 2014	Haleakala	Pan-STARRS 1	·	2.3 km	MPC · JPL
767838	2014 YO_{84}	—	December 27, 2014	Mount Lemmon	Mount Lemmon Survey	·	1.2 km	MPC · JPL
767839	2014 YQ_{84}	—	December 16, 2014	Haleakala	Pan-STARRS 1	·	1.8 km	MPC · JPL
767840	2014 YA_{85}	—	December 21, 2014	Haleakala	Pan-STARRS 1	·	1.4 km	MPC · JPL
767841	2014 YA_{86}	—	December 21, 2014	Haleakala	Pan-STARRS 1	·	2.0 km	MPC · JPL
767842	2014 YR_{86}	—	December 29, 2014	Mount Lemmon	Mount Lemmon Survey	·	2.6 km	MPC · JPL
767843	2014 YW_{87}	—	December 21, 2014	Mount Lemmon	Mount Lemmon Survey	·	1.6 km	MPC · JPL
767844	2014 YC_{88}	—	November 20, 2009	Mount Lemmon	Mount Lemmon Survey	MRX	750 m	MPC · JPL
767845	2014 YM_{88}	—	December 29, 2014	Haleakala	Pan-STARRS 1	·	1.7 km	MPC · JPL
767846	2014 YD_{90}	—	December 29, 2014	Haleakala	Pan-STARRS 1	·	2.2 km	MPC · JPL
767847	2014 YE_{93}	—	December 29, 2014	Haleakala	Pan-STARRS 1	·	2.0 km	MPC · JPL
767848	2014 YG_{93}	—	December 29, 2014	Haleakala	Pan-STARRS 1	·	1.9 km	MPC · JPL
767849	2014 YA_{94}	—	May 1, 2011	Haleakala	Pan-STARRS 1	·	2.4 km	MPC · JPL
767850	2014 YM_{94}	—	December 21, 2014	Haleakala	Pan-STARRS 1	EOS	1.6 km	MPC · JPL
767851	2014 YD_{95}	—	December 26, 2014	Haleakala	Pan-STARRS 1	EOS	1.5 km	MPC · JPL
767852	2014 YN_{95}	—	December 29, 2014	Haleakala	Pan-STARRS 1	·	2.6 km	MPC · JPL
767853	2014 YT_{95}	—	December 26, 2014	Haleakala	Pan-STARRS 1	·	1.3 km	MPC · JPL
767854	2014 YU_{95}	—	December 24, 2014	Mount Lemmon	Mount Lemmon Survey	·	1.5 km	MPC · JPL
767855	2014 YV_{95}	—	August 15, 2013	Haleakala	Pan-STARRS 1	·	1.5 km	MPC · JPL
767856	2014 YF_{96}	—	September 14, 2013	Kitt Peak	Spacewatch	·	2.1 km	MPC · JPL
767857	2014 YW_{96}	—	December 29, 2014	Haleakala	Pan-STARRS 1	·	2.2 km	MPC · JPL
767858	2014 YH_{97}	—	December 29, 2014	Haleakala	Pan-STARRS 1	·	1.9 km	MPC · JPL
767859	2015 AW_{4}	—	November 23, 2014	Haleakala	Pan-STARRS 1	·	2.4 km	MPC · JPL
767860	2015 AZ_{11}	—	October 29, 2008	Kitt Peak	Spacewatch	·	2.3 km	MPC · JPL
767861	2015 AH_{13}	—	October 3, 2013	Haleakala	Pan-STARRS 1	·	2.7 km	MPC · JPL
767862	2015 AJ_{13}	—	November 21, 2014	Haleakala	Pan-STARRS 1	BRA	1.1 km	MPC · JPL
767863	2015 AK_{13}	—	December 1, 2014	Haleakala	Pan-STARRS 1	·	2.2 km	MPC · JPL
767864	2015 AP_{13}	—	October 28, 2013	Mount Lemmon	Mount Lemmon Survey	·	2.4 km	MPC · JPL
767865	2015 AU_{14}	—	November 24, 2008	Kitt Peak	Spacewatch	·	2.6 km	MPC · JPL
767866	2015 AK_{19}	—	December 8, 2014	Haleakala	Pan-STARRS 1	H	400 m	MPC · JPL
767867	2015 AW_{26}	—	February 26, 2012	Haleakala	Pan-STARRS 1	·	490 m	MPC · JPL
767868	2015 AV_{28}	—	December 29, 2014	Mount Lemmon	Mount Lemmon Survey	·	2.8 km	MPC · JPL
767869	2015 AB_{30}	—	December 21, 2014	Haleakala	Pan-STARRS 1	·	530 m	MPC · JPL
767870	2015 AP_{33}	—	October 12, 2007	Kitt Peak	Spacewatch	·	470 m	MPC · JPL
767871	2015 AA_{34}	—	December 21, 2014	Haleakala	Pan-STARRS 1	·	1.9 km	MPC · JPL
767872	2015 AN_{34}	—	November 21, 2009	Kitt Peak	Spacewatch	·	1.2 km	MPC · JPL
767873	2015 AU_{38}	—	October 23, 2006	Kitt Peak	Spacewatch	MAS	550 m	MPC · JPL
767874	2015 AD_{40}	—	November 2, 2008	Mount Lemmon	Mount Lemmon Survey	·	1.9 km	MPC · JPL
767875	2015 AU_{40}	—	January 13, 2015	Haleakala	Pan-STARRS 1	·	710 m	MPC · JPL
767876	2015 AC_{41}	—	September 23, 2008	Kitt Peak	Spacewatch	·	1.4 km	MPC · JPL
767877	2015 AG_{43}	—	September 14, 2013	Haleakala	Pan-STARRS 1	·	2.3 km	MPC · JPL
767878	2015 AM_{43}	—	October 14, 2009	Mount Lemmon	Mount Lemmon Survey	·	1.3 km	MPC · JPL
767879	2015 AL_{47}	—	September 20, 2014	Haleakala	Pan-STARRS 1	PHO	590 m	MPC · JPL
767880	2015 AP_{50}	—	September 14, 2013	Haleakala	Pan-STARRS 1	EOS	1.4 km	MPC · JPL
767881	2015 AA_{52}	—	May 5, 2011	Kitt Peak	Spacewatch	·	2.1 km	MPC · JPL
767882	2015 AF_{58}	—	December 29, 2014	Mount Lemmon	Mount Lemmon Survey	·	1.5 km	MPC · JPL
767883	2015 AQ_{58}	—	December 29, 2014	Mount Lemmon	Mount Lemmon Survey	·	2.3 km	MPC · JPL
767884	2015 AK_{60}	—	February 27, 2012	Haleakala	Pan-STARRS 1	·	420 m	MPC · JPL
767885	2015 AM_{61}	—	December 15, 2014	Mount Lemmon	Mount Lemmon Survey	EOS	1.6 km	MPC · JPL
767886	2015 AW_{61}	—	September 28, 2008	Mount Lemmon	Mount Lemmon Survey	TEL	1.1 km	MPC · JPL
767887	2015 AV_{62}	—	October 23, 2008	Kitt Peak	Spacewatch	·	1.3 km	MPC · JPL
767888	2015 AG_{64}	—	September 23, 2008	Mount Lemmon	Mount Lemmon Survey	·	1.6 km	MPC · JPL
767889	2015 AW_{65}	—	February 28, 2008	Mount Lemmon	Mount Lemmon Survey	NYS	810 m	MPC · JPL
767890	2015 AD_{67}	—	May 27, 2009	Mount Lemmon	Mount Lemmon Survey	·	490 m	MPC · JPL
767891	2015 AS_{70}	—	May 15, 2008	Kitt Peak	Spacewatch	·	1.2 km	MPC · JPL
767892	2015 AY_{70}	—	December 29, 2014	Mount Lemmon	Mount Lemmon Survey	·	2.1 km	MPC · JPL
767893	2015 AH_{72}	—	March 16, 2012	Mount Lemmon	Mount Lemmon Survey	·	500 m	MPC · JPL
767894	2015 AG_{77}	—	August 8, 2012	Haleakala	Pan-STARRS 1	·	2.5 km	MPC · JPL
767895	2015 AW_{79}	—	December 21, 2014	Haleakala	Pan-STARRS 1	·	500 m	MPC · JPL
767896	2015 AD_{80}	—	January 13, 2015	Haleakala	Pan-STARRS 1	EOS	1.3 km	MPC · JPL
767897	2015 AA_{87}	—	October 16, 2007	Mount Lemmon	Mount Lemmon Survey	·	2.3 km	MPC · JPL
767898	2015 AX_{88}	—	January 13, 2015	Haleakala	Pan-STARRS 1	·	2.2 km	MPC · JPL
767899	2015 AC_{90}	—	September 28, 2013	Mount Lemmon	Mount Lemmon Survey	·	1.3 km	MPC · JPL
767900	2015 AO_{93}	—	November 26, 2014	Haleakala	Pan-STARRS 1	ELF	2.7 km	MPC · JPL

== 767901–768000 ==
back to top

Designation			Discovery			Properties		Ref
Permanent	Provisional	Named after	Date	Site	Discoverer(s)	Category	Diam.	Ref
767901	2015 AD_{97}	—	January 14, 2015	Haleakala	Pan-STARRS 1	L5	6.2 km	MPC · JPL
767902	2015 AQ_{98}	—	December 21, 2014	Haleakala	Pan-STARRS 1	EOS	1.5 km	MPC · JPL
767903	2015 AV_{99}	—	September 6, 2013	Mount Lemmon	Mount Lemmon Survey	THM	2.0 km	MPC · JPL
767904	2015 AV_{100}	—	February 3, 2000	Kitt Peak	Spacewatch	·	820 m	MPC · JPL
767905	2015 AT_{101}	—	August 8, 2007	7300	W. K. Y. Yeung	·	1.7 km	MPC · JPL
767906	2015 AD_{103}	—	October 28, 2013	Haleakala	Pan-STARRS 1	·	2.7 km	MPC · JPL
767907	2015 AH_{103}	—	December 21, 2014	Haleakala	Pan-STARRS 1	·	1.9 km	MPC · JPL
767908	2015 AV_{103}	—	December 21, 2014	Haleakala	Pan-STARRS 1	EOS	1.4 km	MPC · JPL
767909	2015 AY_{103}	—	September 14, 2013	Haleakala	Pan-STARRS 1	·	1.4 km	MPC · JPL
767910	2015 AX_{104}	—	December 21, 2014	Haleakala	Pan-STARRS 1	·	1.6 km	MPC · JPL
767911	2015 AF_{105}	—	December 21, 2014	Haleakala	Pan-STARRS 1	EOS	1.4 km	MPC · JPL
767912	2015 AH_{107}	—	May 24, 2011	Mount Lemmon	Mount Lemmon Survey	·	2.6 km	MPC · JPL
767913	2015 AK_{108}	—	December 21, 2014	Mount Lemmon	Mount Lemmon Survey	EOS	1.2 km	MPC · JPL
767914	2015 AS_{108}	—	January 14, 2015	Haleakala	Pan-STARRS 1	·	1.8 km	MPC · JPL
767915	2015 AR_{109}	—	September 18, 2010	Mount Lemmon	Mount Lemmon Survey	·	540 m	MPC · JPL
767916	2015 AX_{109}	—	November 29, 2014	Haleakala	Pan-STARRS 1	·	520 m	MPC · JPL
767917	2015 AP_{110}	—	December 21, 2014	Mount Lemmon	Mount Lemmon Survey	·	2.4 km	MPC · JPL
767918	2015 AF_{117}	—	January 14, 2015	Haleakala	Pan-STARRS 1	·	1.5 km	MPC · JPL
767919	2015 AG_{117}	—	September 5, 2013	Kitt Peak	Spacewatch	·	780 m	MPC · JPL
767920	2015 AO_{117}	—	December 21, 2014	Mount Lemmon	Mount Lemmon Survey	·	1.8 km	MPC · JPL
767921	2015 AD_{119}	—	January 14, 2015	Haleakala	Pan-STARRS 1	·	1.9 km	MPC · JPL
767922	2015 AE_{123}	—	January 14, 2015	Haleakala	Pan-STARRS 1	·	2.3 km	MPC · JPL
767923	2015 AU_{123}	—	November 21, 2008	Kitt Peak	Spacewatch	·	1.5 km	MPC · JPL
767924	2015 AM_{130}	—	September 14, 2013	Haleakala	Pan-STARRS 1	EOS	1.3 km	MPC · JPL
767925	2015 AT_{131}	—	October 13, 2013	Mount Lemmon	Mount Lemmon Survey	·	1.9 km	MPC · JPL
767926	2015 AJ_{132}	—	November 3, 2008	Mount Lemmon	Mount Lemmon Survey	HYG	1.7 km	MPC · JPL
767927	2015 AV_{132}	—	September 25, 2008	Kitt Peak	Spacewatch	·	1.3 km	MPC · JPL
767928	2015 AJ_{145}	—	September 13, 2013	Kitt Peak	Spacewatch	WIT	730 m	MPC · JPL
767929	2015 AK_{146}	—	January 14, 2015	Haleakala	Pan-STARRS 1	·	2.4 km	MPC · JPL
767930	2015 AC_{148}	—	September 2, 2010	Mount Lemmon	Mount Lemmon Survey	·	460 m	MPC · JPL
767931	2015 AO_{150}	—	March 13, 2011	Kitt Peak	Spacewatch	·	1.5 km	MPC · JPL
767932	2015 AQ_{152}	—	January 14, 2015	Haleakala	Pan-STARRS 1	PHO	760 m	MPC · JPL
767933	2015 AL_{154}	—	May 10, 2005	Mount Lemmon	Mount Lemmon Survey	·	670 m	MPC · JPL
767934	2015 AX_{154}	—	July 13, 2013	Haleakala	Pan-STARRS 1	·	500 m	MPC · JPL
767935	2015 AP_{159}	—	January 14, 2015	Haleakala	Pan-STARRS 1	·	500 m	MPC · JPL
767936	2015 AB_{160}	—	January 14, 2015	Haleakala	Pan-STARRS 1	THM	1.7 km	MPC · JPL
767937	2015 AL_{164}	—	May 12, 2012	Mount Lemmon	Mount Lemmon Survey	·	580 m	MPC · JPL
767938	2015 AE_{165}	—	January 14, 2015	Haleakala	Pan-STARRS 1	KOR	1.0 km	MPC · JPL
767939	2015 AR_{165}	—	September 4, 2008	Kitt Peak	Spacewatch	·	1.4 km	MPC · JPL
767940	2015 AV_{165}	—	December 21, 2014	Mount Lemmon	Mount Lemmon Survey	·	2.1 km	MPC · JPL
767941	2015 AV_{166}	—	September 26, 2013	Mount Lemmon	Mount Lemmon Survey	·	1.4 km	MPC · JPL
767942	2015 AG_{167}	—	November 21, 2008	Kitt Peak	Spacewatch	THM	1.5 km	MPC · JPL
767943	2015 AZ_{169}	—	January 14, 2015	Haleakala	Pan-STARRS 1	·	2.4 km	MPC · JPL
767944	2015 AC_{170}	—	November 11, 2013	Mount Lemmon	Mount Lemmon Survey	·	3.2 km	MPC · JPL
767945	2015 AN_{170}	—	January 19, 2004	Kitt Peak	Spacewatch	·	2.2 km	MPC · JPL
767946	2015 AB_{171}	—	November 1, 2008	Mount Lemmon	Mount Lemmon Survey	·	1.5 km	MPC · JPL
767947	2015 AY_{172}	—	December 21, 2014	Haleakala	Pan-STARRS 1	·	2.2 km	MPC · JPL
767948	2015 AB_{173}	—	January 14, 2015	Haleakala	Pan-STARRS 1	KOR	1.0 km	MPC · JPL
767949	2015 AM_{176}	—	October 3, 2013	Mount Lemmon	Mount Lemmon Survey	·	2.2 km	MPC · JPL
767950	2015 AT_{178}	—	December 19, 2007	Kitt Peak	Spacewatch	·	410 m	MPC · JPL
767951	2015 AB_{179}	—	January 14, 2015	Haleakala	Pan-STARRS 1	EOS	1.5 km	MPC · JPL
767952	2015 AL_{180}	—	January 14, 2015	Haleakala	Pan-STARRS 1	·	2.0 km	MPC · JPL
767953	2015 AU_{180}	—	January 14, 2015	Haleakala	Pan-STARRS 1	·	630 m	MPC · JPL
767954	2015 AG_{181}	—	April 29, 2012	Kitt Peak	Spacewatch	·	510 m	MPC · JPL
767955	2015 AF_{183}	—	December 21, 2014	Haleakala	Pan-STARRS 1	·	1.8 km	MPC · JPL
767956	2015 AF_{184}	—	September 30, 2013	Catalina	CSS	·	2.0 km	MPC · JPL
767957	2015 AH_{189}	—	January 14, 2015	Haleakala	Pan-STARRS 1	·	580 m	MPC · JPL
767958	2015 AJ_{189}	—	December 21, 2014	Haleakala	Pan-STARRS 1	·	1.4 km	MPC · JPL
767959	2015 AD_{190}	—	December 21, 2014	Mount Lemmon	Mount Lemmon Survey	·	2.2 km	MPC · JPL
767960	2015 AJ_{195}	—	December 26, 2014	Haleakala	Pan-STARRS 1	·	470 m	MPC · JPL
767961	2015 AF_{196}	—	January 14, 2015	Haleakala	Pan-STARRS 1	·	2.2 km	MPC · JPL
767962	2015 AT_{196}	—	March 8, 2008	Mount Lemmon	Mount Lemmon Survey	·	800 m	MPC · JPL
767963	2015 AW_{196}	—	January 14, 2015	Haleakala	Pan-STARRS 1	·	2.2 km	MPC · JPL
767964	2015 AV_{197}	—	February 3, 2008	Mount Lemmon	Mount Lemmon Survey	·	540 m	MPC · JPL
767965	2015 AU_{198}	—	January 14, 2015	Haleakala	Pan-STARRS 1	·	2.1 km	MPC · JPL
767966	2015 AA_{199}	—	November 28, 2014	Mount Lemmon	Mount Lemmon Survey	·	1.4 km	MPC · JPL
767967	2015 AC_{199}	—	September 1, 2013	Mount Lemmon	Mount Lemmon Survey	·	1.6 km	MPC · JPL
767968	2015 AU_{200}	—	December 26, 2014	Haleakala	Pan-STARRS 1	·	650 m	MPC · JPL
767969	2015 AC_{201}	—	December 19, 2009	Mount Lemmon	Mount Lemmon Survey	·	1.4 km	MPC · JPL
767970	2015 AU_{201}	—	January 14, 2015	Haleakala	Pan-STARRS 1	·	1.1 km	MPC · JPL
767971	2015 AD_{203}	—	December 24, 2014	Mount Lemmon	Mount Lemmon Survey	·	2.6 km	MPC · JPL
767972	2015 AP_{203}	—	September 14, 2013	Haleakala	Pan-STARRS 1	·	2.0 km	MPC · JPL
767973	2015 AR_{204}	—	March 15, 2012	Mount Lemmon	Mount Lemmon Survey	·	570 m	MPC · JPL
767974	2015 AZ_{205}	—	January 15, 2015	Mount Lemmon	Mount Lemmon Survey	·	1.9 km	MPC · JPL
767975	2015 AC_{206}	—	September 24, 2008	Mount Lemmon	Mount Lemmon Survey	·	1.3 km	MPC · JPL
767976	2015 AS_{206}	—	September 11, 2007	XuYi	PMO NEO Survey Program	·	570 m	MPC · JPL
767977	2015 AX_{209}	—	December 29, 2014	Haleakala	Pan-STARRS 1	·	2.3 km	MPC · JPL
767978	2015 AN_{222}	—	December 3, 2008	Kitt Peak	Spacewatch	EOS	1.4 km	MPC · JPL
767979	2015 AQ_{223}	—	October 31, 2013	Mount Lemmon	Mount Lemmon Survey	·	2.2 km	MPC · JPL
767980	2015 AN_{224}	—	May 10, 2005	Mount Lemmon	Mount Lemmon Survey	·	2.7 km	MPC · JPL
767981	2015 AW_{224}	—	November 1, 2013	Mount Lemmon	Mount Lemmon Survey	·	2.3 km	MPC · JPL
767982	2015 AB_{225}	—	January 15, 2015	Haleakala	Pan-STARRS 1	·	2.2 km	MPC · JPL
767983	2015 AC_{226}	—	August 17, 2012	ESA OGS	ESA OGS	·	2.4 km	MPC · JPL
767984	2015 AV_{226}	—	December 29, 2008	Kitt Peak	Spacewatch	·	2.2 km	MPC · JPL
767985	2015 AQ_{227}	—	November 8, 2013	Mount Lemmon	Mount Lemmon Survey	EOS	1.7 km	MPC · JPL
767986	2015 AC_{229}	—	October 26, 2013	Mount Lemmon	Mount Lemmon Survey	·	2.3 km	MPC · JPL
767987	2015 AG_{230}	—	October 12, 2013	Kitt Peak	Spacewatch	·	2.2 km	MPC · JPL
767988	2015 AY_{230}	—	January 15, 2015	Haleakala	Pan-STARRS 1	·	1.5 km	MPC · JPL
767989	2015 AD_{232}	—	January 2, 2009	Kitt Peak	Spacewatch	·	2.4 km	MPC · JPL
767990	2015 AE_{232}	—	September 2, 2013	Palomar	Palomar Transient Factory	·	2.2 km	MPC · JPL
767991	2015 AG_{235}	—	November 25, 2010	Mount Lemmon	Mount Lemmon Survey	·	520 m	MPC · JPL
767992	2015 AH_{235}	—	January 15, 2015	Haleakala	Pan-STARRS 1	·	2.4 km	MPC · JPL
767993	2015 AA_{237}	—	October 12, 2013	Kitt Peak	Spacewatch	EOS	1.6 km	MPC · JPL
767994	2015 AE_{237}	—	October 9, 2007	Mount Lemmon	Mount Lemmon Survey	VER	2.1 km	MPC · JPL
767995	2015 AL_{238}	—	January 15, 2015	Haleakala	Pan-STARRS 1	·	2.3 km	MPC · JPL
767996	2015 AV_{240}	—	September 15, 2012	Mount Lemmon	Mount Lemmon Survey	EOS	1.5 km	MPC · JPL
767997	2015 AC_{242}	—	April 21, 2012	Mount Lemmon	Mount Lemmon Survey	·	620 m	MPC · JPL
767998	2015 AO_{242}	—	October 15, 2007	Mount Lemmon	Mount Lemmon Survey	EOS	1.7 km	MPC · JPL
767999	2015 AP_{242}	—	January 15, 2015	Haleakala	Pan-STARRS 1	·	2.3 km	MPC · JPL
768000	2015 AT_{244}	—	November 1, 2013	Mount Lemmon	Mount Lemmon Survey	·	2.4 km	MPC · JPL

back to top

== Meaning of names ==
As minor planet discoveries are confirmed, they are given a permanent number by the IAU's Minor Planet Center (MPC), and the discoverers can then submit names for them, following the IAU's naming conventions. The list below concerns those minor planets in the specified number-range that have received names, and explains the meanings of those names.

Official naming citations of newly named small Solar System bodies are approved and published in a bulletin by IAU's Working Group for Small Bodies Nomenclature (WGSBN). Before May 2021, citations were published in MPC's Minor Planet Circulars for many decades. Recent citations can also be found on the JPL Small-Body Database (SBDB). Until his death in 2016, German astronomer Lutz D. Schmadel compiled these citations into the Dictionary of Minor Planet Names (DMP) and regularly updated the collection.

Based on Paul Herget's The Names of the Minor Planets, Schmadel also researched the unclear origin of numerous asteroids, most of which had been named prior to World War II. This article incorporates text from this source, which is in the public domain: SBDB New namings may only be added to this list below after official publication as the preannouncement of names is condemned. The WGSBN publishes a comprehensive guideline for the naming rules of non-cometary small Solar System bodies.

Named minor planet	Provisional	This minor planet was named for...	Ref · Catalog
767321 Inceu	2014 TJ_{100}	Victor Inceu, Romanian amateur astronomer.	IAU · 767321
767327 Diamandi	2014 TK_{111}	Constanța Diamandi, Romanian museographer of the Planetarium in Constanța.	IAU · 767327
767828 Conovici	2014 YL_{74}	Matei Conovici, Romanian amateur astronomer and software engineer.	IAU · 767828
