= List of minor planets: 878001–879000 =

The following is a partial list of minor planets, running from minor-planet number 878001 through 879000, inclusive. The primary data for this and other partial lists is based on JPL's "Small-Body Orbital Elements" and data available from the Minor Planet Center. Critical list information is also provided by the MPC, unless otherwise specified from Lowell Observatory. A detailed description of the table's columns and additional sources are given on the main page including a complete list of every page in this series, and a statistical break-up on the dynamical classification of minor planets.

Also see the summary list of all named bodies in numerical and alphabetical order, and the corresponding naming citations for the number range of this particular list. New namings may only be added to this list after official publication, as the preannouncement of names is condemned by the Working Group for Small Bodies Nomenclature of the International Astronomical Union.

Near-Earth obj.	MBA (inner)	MBA (outer)	Centaur
Mars-crosser	MBA (middle)	Jupiter trojan	Trans-Neptunian obj.
Unclassified

== 878001–878100 ==
Designation			Discovery			Properties		Ref
Permanent	Provisional	Named after	Date	Site	Discoverer(s)	Category	Diam.	Ref
878001	2011 RC_{32}	—	September 8, 2011	Kitt Peak	Spacewatch	AEO	900 m	MPC · JPL
878002	2011 RE_{32}	—	September 4, 2011	Haleakala	Pan-STARRS 1	·	1.2 km	MPC · JPL
878003	2011 RS_{32}	—	September 2, 2011	Haleakala	Pan-STARRS 1	·	1.1 km	MPC · JPL
878004	2011 RG_{43}	—	September 4, 2011	Haleakala	Pan-STARRS 1	·	1.2 km	MPC · JPL
878005	2011 SO_{1}	—	September 17, 2011	Haleakala	Pan-STARRS 1	·	1.0 km	MPC · JPL
878006	2011 SB_{13}	—	September 17, 2011	Haleakala	Pan-STARRS 1	H	340 m	MPC · JPL
878007	2011 SU_{15}	—	September 18, 2011	Haleakala	Pan-STARRS 1	·	1.3 km	MPC · JPL
878008	2011 SJ_{16}	—	September 20, 2011	Catalina	CSS	T_{j} (2.7) · APO	510 m	MPC · JPL
878009	2011 SD_{17}	—	September 19, 2011	Mount Lemmon	Mount Lemmon Survey	·	1.2 km	MPC · JPL
878010	2011 SD_{19}	—	September 19, 2011	Mount Lemmon	Mount Lemmon Survey	·	1.2 km	MPC · JPL
878011	2011 SP_{21}	—	July 1, 2011	Mount Lemmon	Mount Lemmon Survey	·	1.2 km	MPC · JPL
878012	2011 SC_{22}	—	September 19, 2011	Haleakala	Pan-STARRS 1	DOR	1.1 km	MPC · JPL
878013	2011 SO_{27}	—	August 18, 2002	Palomar	NEAT	·	1.4 km	MPC · JPL
878014	2011 SY_{31}	—	August 20, 2011	Haleakala	Pan-STARRS 1	·	1.3 km	MPC · JPL
878015	2011 SM_{33}	—	September 20, 2011	Haleakala	Pan-STARRS 1	·	880 m	MPC · JPL
878016	2011 ST_{34}	—	September 20, 2011	Kitt Peak	Spacewatch	·	540 m	MPC · JPL
878017	2011 SA_{38}	—	September 20, 2011	Kitt Peak	Spacewatch	·	1.2 km	MPC · JPL
878018	2011 SP_{38}	—	September 4, 2011	Haleakala	Pan-STARRS 1	·	1.4 km	MPC · JPL
878019	2011 SR_{39}	—	August 26, 2011	Haleakala	Pan-STARRS 1	·	410 m	MPC · JPL
878020	2011 SZ_{40}	—	September 18, 2011	Mount Lemmon	Mount Lemmon Survey	·	1.1 km	MPC · JPL
878021	2011 SM_{43}	—	September 18, 2011	Mount Lemmon	Mount Lemmon Survey	·	1.4 km	MPC · JPL
878022	2011 SD_{68}	—	October 28, 2008	Kitt Peak	Spacewatch	·	570 m	MPC · JPL
878023	2011 SS_{70}	—	June 27, 2011	Mount Lemmon	Mount Lemmon Survey	(1547)	1.5 km	MPC · JPL
878024	2011 SA_{92}	—	September 22, 2011	Kitt Peak	Spacewatch	·	1.4 km	MPC · JPL
878025	2011 SE_{94}	—	September 4, 2011	Haleakala	Pan-STARRS 1	·	1.1 km	MPC · JPL
878026	2011 SH_{94}	—	September 24, 2011	Haleakala	Pan-STARRS 1	·	1.1 km	MPC · JPL
878027	2011 SO_{102}	—	September 2, 2011	Haleakala	Pan-STARRS 1	·	1.1 km	MPC · JPL
878028	2011 SK_{106}	—	September 24, 2011	Bergisch Gladbach	W. Bickel	V	430 m	MPC · JPL
878029	2011 SN_{114}	—	August 30, 2011	La Sagra	OAM	·	1.2 km	MPC · JPL
878030	2011 SD_{123}	—	September 17, 2006	Kitt Peak	Spacewatch	DOR	1.4 km	MPC · JPL
878031	2011 ST_{138}	—	September 23, 2011	Mount Lemmon	Mount Lemmon Survey	EOS	1.3 km	MPC · JPL
878032	2011 SW_{144}	—	September 26, 2011	Kitt Peak	Spacewatch	AEO	840 m	MPC · JPL
878033	2011 SW_{145}	—	September 26, 2011	Mount Lemmon	Mount Lemmon Survey	AGN	790 m	MPC · JPL
878034	2011 SO_{152}	—	September 26, 2011	Haleakala	Pan-STARRS 1	·	1.4 km	MPC · JPL
878035	2011 SR_{153}	—	September 26, 2011	Haleakala	Pan-STARRS 1	·	1.0 km	MPC · JPL
878036	2011 SV_{162}	—	September 23, 2011	Kitt Peak	Spacewatch	·	1.1 km	MPC · JPL
878037	2011 SZ_{162}	—	September 23, 2011	Kitt Peak	Spacewatch	·	480 m	MPC · JPL
878038	2011 SE_{173}	—	September 24, 2011	Haleakala	Pan-STARRS 1	·	1.5 km	MPC · JPL
878039	2011 SK_{176}	—	September 29, 2011	Mount Lemmon	Mount Lemmon Survey	critical	1.4 km	MPC · JPL
878040	2011 SU_{181}	—	September 26, 2011	Kitt Peak	Spacewatch	AGN	820 m	MPC · JPL
878041	2011 SV_{181}	—	September 26, 2011	Kitt Peak	Spacewatch	AEO	780 m	MPC · JPL
878042	2011 SE_{182}	—	September 26, 2011	Kitt Peak	Spacewatch	·	1.0 km	MPC · JPL
878043	2011 SR_{182}	—	September 26, 2011	Kitt Peak	Spacewatch	·	1.2 km	MPC · JPL
878044	2011 SH_{183}	—	September 14, 2006	Kitt Peak	Spacewatch	·	1.4 km	MPC · JPL
878045	2011 SR_{189}	—	August 24, 2011	Haleakala	Pan-STARRS 1	·	910 m	MPC · JPL
878046	2011 SO_{192}	—	September 26, 2011	Taunus	Karge, S., R. Kling	·	1.1 km	MPC · JPL
878047	2011 SC_{193}	—	September 4, 2011	Haleakala	Pan-STARRS 1	AGN	670 m	MPC · JPL
878048	2011 SR_{200}	—	September 18, 2011	Mount Lemmon	Mount Lemmon Survey	·	450 m	MPC · JPL
878049	2011 SE_{202}	—	August 25, 2004	Kitt Peak	Spacewatch	·	400 m	MPC · JPL
878050	2011 SP_{209}	—	September 20, 2011	Mount Lemmon	Mount Lemmon Survey	NEM	1.4 km	MPC · JPL
878051	2011 SH_{216}	—	August 23, 2011	Haleakala	Pan-STARRS 1	DOR	1.5 km	MPC · JPL
878052	2011 SL_{218}	—	September 25, 2011	Haleakala	Pan-STARRS 1	·	1.0 km	MPC · JPL
878053	2011 SW_{235}	—	September 28, 2011	Mount Lemmon	Mount Lemmon Survey	·	1.8 km	MPC · JPL
878054	2011 SM_{240}	—	September 8, 2011	Kitt Peak	Spacewatch	·	1.3 km	MPC · JPL
878055	2011 SO_{241}	—	September 26, 2011	Mount Lemmon	Mount Lemmon Survey	·	1.2 km	MPC · JPL
878056	2011 SK_{245}	—	September 29, 2011	Mount Lemmon	Mount Lemmon Survey	·	1.2 km	MPC · JPL
878057	2011 SO_{250}	—	September 26, 2011	Haleakala	Pan-STARRS 1	·	1.4 km	MPC · JPL
878058	2011 SN_{261}	—	November 18, 1998	Roque de los Muchachos	Faint Sky Variability Survey	·	600 m	MPC · JPL
878059	2011 SD_{265}	—	August 10, 2011	Haleakala	Pan-STARRS 1	·	1.4 km	MPC · JPL
878060	2011 SY_{271}	—	September 9, 2011	Kitt Peak	Spacewatch	·	480 m	MPC · JPL
878061	2011 SL_{273}	—	September 21, 2011	Catalina	CSS	·	1.3 km	MPC · JPL
878062	2011 SU_{277}	—	September 23, 2011	Kitt Peak	Spacewatch	H	400 m	MPC · JPL
878063	2011 SY_{277}	—	September 27, 2011	Mount Lemmon	Mount Lemmon Survey	H	460 m	MPC · JPL
878064	2011 ST_{278}	—	September 21, 2011	Haleakala	Pan-STARRS 1	·	1.3 km	MPC · JPL
878065	2011 ST_{285}	—	July 11, 2016	Haleakala	Pan-STARRS 1	·	2.2 km	MPC · JPL
878066	2011 SY_{289}	—	September 18, 2011	Mount Lemmon	Mount Lemmon Survey	·	1.4 km	MPC · JPL
878067	2011 SD_{294}	—	September 24, 2011	Haleakala	Pan-STARRS 1	HNS	690 m	MPC · JPL
878068	2011 SM_{294}	—	September 28, 2011	Kitt Peak	Spacewatch	·	1.0 km	MPC · JPL
878069	2011 SJ_{295}	—	September 23, 2011	Kitt Peak	Spacewatch	H	320 m	MPC · JPL
878070	2011 SR_{296}	—	September 23, 2011	Haleakala	Pan-STARRS 1	·	770 m	MPC · JPL
878071	2011 SM_{299}	—	September 26, 2011	Mount Lemmon	Mount Lemmon Survey	·	2.1 km	MPC · JPL
878072	2011 SS_{299}	—	September 27, 2011	Mount Lemmon	Mount Lemmon Survey	·	710 m	MPC · JPL
878073	2011 SL_{301}	—	September 24, 2011	Mount Lemmon	Mount Lemmon Survey	·	1.6 km	MPC · JPL
878074	2011 SY_{303}	—	September 20, 2011	Mount Lemmon	Mount Lemmon Survey	·	1.2 km	MPC · JPL
878075	2011 SG_{309}	—	September 26, 2011	Mount Lemmon	Mount Lemmon Survey	PHO	710 m	MPC · JPL
878076	2011 SB_{313}	—	September 24, 2011	Mount Lemmon	Mount Lemmon Survey	·	1.2 km	MPC · JPL
878077	2011 SL_{313}	—	September 29, 2011	Kitt Peak	Spacewatch	MRX	720 m	MPC · JPL
878078	2011 SH_{314}	—	September 19, 2011	Mount Lemmon	Mount Lemmon Survey	·	470 m	MPC · JPL
878079	2011 SB_{315}	—	September 23, 2011	Kitt Peak	Spacewatch	·	1.3 km	MPC · JPL
878080	2011 SS_{315}	—	September 20, 2011	Kitt Peak	Spacewatch	AEO	690 m	MPC · JPL
878081	2011 SC_{317}	—	September 19, 2011	Haleakala	Pan-STARRS 1	·	1.4 km	MPC · JPL
878082	2011 SK_{317}	—	September 28, 2011	Mount Lemmon	Mount Lemmon Survey	AGN	720 m	MPC · JPL
878083	2011 SY_{317}	—	September 30, 2011	Kitt Peak	Spacewatch	AEO	890 m	MPC · JPL
878084	2011 SE_{318}	—	September 26, 2011	Mount Lemmon	Mount Lemmon Survey	·	1.1 km	MPC · JPL
878085	2011 SN_{318}	—	September 24, 2011	Mount Lemmon	Mount Lemmon Survey	·	1 km	MPC · JPL
878086	2011 SH_{319}	—	September 20, 2011	Mount Lemmon	Mount Lemmon Survey	NEM	1.9 km	MPC · JPL
878087	2011 SN_{319}	—	September 29, 2011	Kitt Peak	Spacewatch	·	1.4 km	MPC · JPL
878088	2011 ST_{319}	—	September 27, 2011	Mount Lemmon	Mount Lemmon Survey	·	1.2 km	MPC · JPL
878089	2011 SZ_{321}	—	September 21, 2011	Kitt Peak	Spacewatch	·	1.3 km	MPC · JPL
878090	2011 SM_{322}	—	September 29, 2011	Mount Lemmon	Mount Lemmon Survey	·	1.3 km	MPC · JPL
878091	2011 SN_{322}	—	September 21, 2011	Kitt Peak	Spacewatch	DOR	1.6 km	MPC · JPL
878092	2011 ST_{322}	—	September 26, 2011	Haleakala	Pan-STARRS 1	·	1.1 km	MPC · JPL
878093	2011 SA_{323}	—	September 25, 2011	Haleakala	Pan-STARRS 1	·	1.3 km	MPC · JPL
878094	2011 SB_{324}	—	September 18, 2011	Mount Lemmon	Mount Lemmon Survey	·	1.3 km	MPC · JPL
878095	2011 SU_{324}	—	September 23, 2011	Haleakala	Pan-STARRS 1	·	1.1 km	MPC · JPL
878096	2011 SB_{325}	—	September 25, 2011	Haleakala	Pan-STARRS 1	·	1.1 km	MPC · JPL
878097	2011 SP_{330}	—	September 28, 2011	Mount Lemmon	Mount Lemmon Survey	·	2.1 km	MPC · JPL
878098	2011 SL_{336}	—	September 27, 2011	Mount Lemmon	Mount Lemmon Survey	·	520 m	MPC · JPL
878099	2011 SZ_{351}	—	September 22, 2011	Kitt Peak	Spacewatch	·	2.0 km	MPC · JPL
878100	2011 SJ_{361}	—	September 27, 2011	Kitt Peak	Spacewatch	·	1.1 km	MPC · JPL

== 878101–878200 ==
back to top

Designation			Discovery			Properties		Ref
Permanent	Provisional	Named after	Date	Site	Discoverer(s)	Category	Diam.	Ref
878101	2011 SW_{365}	—	September 21, 2011	Mount Lemmon	Mount Lemmon Survey	·	1.2 km	MPC · JPL
878102	2011 TX_{4}	—	October 2, 2011	Westfield	International Astronomical Search Collaboration	·	1.2 km	MPC · JPL
878103	2011 TK_{7}	—	October 2, 2011	Bergisch Gladbach	W. Bickel	HOF	1.9 km	MPC · JPL
878104	2011 TN_{7}	—	October 2, 2011	Bergisch Gladbach	W. Bickel	·	890 m	MPC · JPL
878105	2011 TU_{9}	—	October 20, 2004	Catalina	CSS	·	680 m	MPC · JPL
878106	2011 TG_{17}	—	October 26, 2011	Haleakala	Pan-STARRS 1	·	1.2 km	MPC · JPL
878107	2011 TV_{19}	—	December 6, 2016	Mount Lemmon	Mount Lemmon Survey	·	1.7 km	MPC · JPL
878108	2011 TH_{20}	—	October 4, 2011	Piszkéstető	K. Sárneczky	·	2.2 km	MPC · JPL
878109	2011 TD_{22}	—	October 1, 2011	Kitt Peak	Spacewatch	·	1.3 km	MPC · JPL
878110	2011 TO_{24}	—	October 1, 2011	Mount Lemmon	Mount Lemmon Survey	·	1.4 km	MPC · JPL
878111	2011 UB_{8}	—	October 18, 2011	Mount Lemmon	Mount Lemmon Survey	H	340 m	MPC · JPL
878112	2011 UG_{11}	—	October 16, 2011	Haleakala	Pan-STARRS 1	·	1.3 km	MPC · JPL
878113	2011 UR_{13}	—	October 17, 2011	Kitt Peak	Spacewatch	DOR	1.8 km	MPC · JPL
878114	2011 UC_{15}	—	October 17, 2011	Kitt Peak	Spacewatch	·	600 m	MPC · JPL
878115	2011 UM_{17}	—	September 24, 2011	Mount Lemmon	Mount Lemmon Survey	·	2.1 km	MPC · JPL
878116	2011 UK_{20}	—	October 18, 2011	Catalina	CSS	H	430 m	MPC · JPL
878117	2011 UW_{24}	—	October 8, 2004	Kitt Peak	Spacewatch	critical	560 m	MPC · JPL
878118	2011 UP_{34}	—	October 19, 2011	Mount Lemmon	Mount Lemmon Survey	·	1.1 km	MPC · JPL
878119	2011 UZ_{41}	—	November 4, 2002	Palomar	NEAT	·	1.2 km	MPC · JPL
878120	2011 US_{42}	—	October 8, 2004	Kitt Peak	Spacewatch	·	470 m	MPC · JPL
878121	2011 UX_{43}	—	October 4, 2004	Kitt Peak	Spacewatch	·	500 m	MPC · JPL
878122	2011 US_{49}	—	September 22, 2011	Mount Lemmon	Mount Lemmon Survey	·	510 m	MPC · JPL
878123	2011 UZ_{67}	—	September 25, 2011	Haleakala	Pan-STARRS 1	·	1.2 km	MPC · JPL
878124	2011 UJ_{73}	—	October 18, 2011	Mount Lemmon	Mount Lemmon Survey	·	680 m	MPC · JPL
878125	2011 UU_{78}	—	October 19, 2011	Kitt Peak	Spacewatch	·	1.3 km	MPC · JPL
878126	2011 UZ_{79}	—	October 19, 2011	Kitt Peak	Spacewatch	·	590 m	MPC · JPL
878127	2011 UB_{91}	—	September 24, 2011	Haleakala	Pan-STARRS 1	·	1.5 km	MPC · JPL
878128	2011 UB_{97}	—	October 19, 2011	Mount Lemmon	Mount Lemmon Survey	·	1.3 km	MPC · JPL
878129	2011 UX_{97}	—	September 22, 2011	Kitt Peak	Spacewatch	·	570 m	MPC · JPL
878130	2011 UO_{100}	—	October 20, 2011	Mount Lemmon	Mount Lemmon Survey	·	1.1 km	MPC · JPL
878131	2011 UE_{109}	—	February 26, 2008	Mount Lemmon	Mount Lemmon Survey	·	1.4 km	MPC · JPL
878132	2011 UV_{117}	—	September 23, 2011	Mount Lemmon	Mount Lemmon Survey	JUN	850 m	MPC · JPL
878133	2011 UF_{119}	—	September 26, 2011	Kitt Peak	Spacewatch	AEO	970 m	MPC · JPL
878134	2011 UQ_{123}	—	October 19, 2011	Mount Lemmon	Mount Lemmon Survey	AGN	820 m	MPC · JPL
878135	2011 UN_{137}	—	September 21, 2011	Mount Lemmon	Mount Lemmon Survey	·	2.1 km	MPC · JPL
878136	2011 UE_{144}	—	September 24, 2011	Mount Lemmon	Mount Lemmon Survey	·	1.4 km	MPC · JPL
878137	2011 UG_{144}	—	October 24, 2011	Kitt Peak	Spacewatch	·	470 m	MPC · JPL
878138	2011 UE_{145}	—	October 24, 2011	Kitt Peak	Spacewatch	·	550 m	MPC · JPL
878139	2011 UL_{152}	—	October 20, 2011	Mount Lemmon	Mount Lemmon Survey	PHO	900 m	MPC · JPL
878140	2011 UC_{153}	—	October 21, 2011	Mount Lemmon	Mount Lemmon Survey	·	1.1 km	MPC · JPL
878141	2011 UX_{155}	—	October 24, 2011	Mount Lemmon	Mount Lemmon Survey	·	1.1 km	MPC · JPL
878142	2011 UT_{158}	—	October 25, 2011	Haleakala	Pan-STARRS 1	·	550 m	MPC · JPL
878143	2011 UR_{163}	—	October 3, 2011	Mount Lemmon	Mount Lemmon Survey	·	1.2 km	MPC · JPL
878144	2011 UX_{166}	—	September 19, 2011	Haleakala	Pan-STARRS 1	·	470 m	MPC · JPL
878145	2011 UA_{168}	—	September 19, 2011	Haleakala	Pan-STARRS 1	·	760 m	MPC · JPL
878146	2011 UY_{172}	—	September 8, 2011	Kitt Peak	Spacewatch	·	1.2 km	MPC · JPL
878147	2011 UU_{178}	—	October 20, 2011	Mount Lemmon	Mount Lemmon Survey	H	340 m	MPC · JPL
878148	2011 UW_{191}	—	September 15, 2004	Kitt Peak	Spacewatch	·	580 m	MPC · JPL
878149	2011 UH_{199}	—	October 25, 2011	Haleakala	Pan-STARRS 1	·	1.3 km	MPC · JPL
878150	2011 US_{200}	—	September 24, 2011	Haleakala	Pan-STARRS 1	·	1.1 km	MPC · JPL
878151	2011 UP_{203}	—	October 26, 2011	Haleakala	Pan-STARRS 1	·	1.7 km	MPC · JPL
878152	2011 UQ_{214}	—	October 19, 2011	Mount Lemmon	Mount Lemmon Survey	·	1.1 km	MPC · JPL
878153	2011 UK_{215}	—	October 19, 2011	Mount Lemmon	Mount Lemmon Survey	·	1.5 km	MPC · JPL
878154	2011 US_{215}	—	September 23, 2011	Kitt Peak	Spacewatch	·	1.2 km	MPC · JPL
878155	2011 UU_{215}	—	October 24, 2011	Mount Lemmon	Mount Lemmon Survey	·	960 m	MPC · JPL
878156	2011 UU_{225}	—	September 24, 2011	Mount Lemmon	Mount Lemmon Survey	(5)	590 m	MPC · JPL
878157	2011 UX_{228}	—	October 7, 2004	Kitt Peak	Spacewatch	PHO	470 m	MPC · JPL
878158	2011 UD_{232}	—	September 30, 2011	Kitt Peak	Spacewatch	·	480 m	MPC · JPL
878159	2011 UA_{241}	—	October 19, 2011	Mount Lemmon	Mount Lemmon Survey	·	920 m	MPC · JPL
878160	2011 UH_{244}	—	October 25, 2011	Haleakala	Pan-STARRS 1	·	1.4 km	MPC · JPL
878161	2011 UV_{248}	—	October 26, 2011	Haleakala	Pan-STARRS 1	DOR	1.8 km	MPC · JPL
878162	2011 UK_{258}	—	March 11, 2008	Mount Lemmon	Mount Lemmon Survey	·	1.1 km	MPC · JPL
878163	2011 UU_{271}	—	October 29, 2011	Oukaïmeden	M. Ory	·	1.2 km	MPC · JPL
878164	2011 UM_{279}	—	October 25, 2011	Haleakala	Pan-STARRS 1	·	1.3 km	MPC · JPL
878165	2011 UM_{282}	—	September 23, 2011	Mount Lemmon	Mount Lemmon Survey	·	1.4 km	MPC · JPL
878166	2011 UU_{286}	—	October 1, 2003	Kitt Peak	Spacewatch	·	520 m	MPC · JPL
878167	2011 UH_{288}	—	October 28, 2011	Mount Lemmon	Mount Lemmon Survey	·	1.3 km	MPC · JPL
878168	2011 UH_{293}	—	October 26, 2011	Haleakala	Pan-STARRS 1	·	1.2 km	MPC · JPL
878169	2011 UW_{300}	—	September 28, 2011	Mount Lemmon	Mount Lemmon Survey	·	1.0 km	MPC · JPL
878170	2011 UH_{302}	—	October 31, 2011	Mayhill-ISON	L. Elenin	·	1.3 km	MPC · JPL
878171	2011 UH_{312}	—	October 24, 2011	Mount Lemmon	Mount Lemmon Survey	·	1.3 km	MPC · JPL
878172	2011 UY_{318}	—	October 30, 2011	Kitt Peak	Spacewatch	·	520 m	MPC · JPL
878173	2011 UY_{320}	—	September 22, 2011	Kitt Peak	Spacewatch	·	970 m	MPC · JPL
878174	2011 US_{326}	—	October 21, 2011	Kitt Peak	Spacewatch	critical	510 m	MPC · JPL
878175	2011 UL_{329}	—	October 5, 2011	Piszkéstető	K. Sárneczky	DOR	1.6 km	MPC · JPL
878176	2011 UZ_{338}	—	September 21, 2011	Kitt Peak	Spacewatch	·	2.7 km	MPC · JPL
878177	2011 UA_{339}	—	September 29, 2011	Mount Lemmon	Mount Lemmon Survey	·	1.4 km	MPC · JPL
878178	2011 UO_{339}	—	September 8, 2011	Haleakala	Pan-STARRS 1	PHO	560 m	MPC · JPL
878179	2011 UL_{346}	—	October 19, 2011	Mount Lemmon	Mount Lemmon Survey	·	1.2 km	MPC · JPL
878180	2011 UH_{356}	—	October 20, 2011	Mount Lemmon	Mount Lemmon Survey	·	1.4 km	MPC · JPL
878181	2011 UK_{360}	—	September 29, 2011	Kitt Peak	Spacewatch	·	640 m	MPC · JPL
878182	2011 UG_{369}	—	October 22, 2011	Kitt Peak	Spacewatch	·	2.0 km	MPC · JPL
878183	2011 UF_{370}	—	October 23, 2011	Kitt Peak	Spacewatch	·	1.2 km	MPC · JPL
878184	2011 UV_{370}	—	September 24, 2011	Haleakala	Pan-STARRS 1	·	930 m	MPC · JPL
878185	2011 UK_{371}	—	October 23, 2011	Mount Lemmon	Mount Lemmon Survey	·	1.4 km	MPC · JPL
878186	2011 UF_{376}	—	October 23, 2011	Mount Lemmon	Mount Lemmon Survey	·	1.3 km	MPC · JPL
878187	2011 UM_{376}	—	September 21, 2011	Kitt Peak	Spacewatch	·	1.3 km	MPC · JPL
878188	2011 UG_{377}	—	September 26, 2011	Kitt Peak	Spacewatch	(13314)	1.2 km	MPC · JPL
878189	2011 UM_{379}	—	October 23, 2011	Haleakala	Pan-STARRS 1	·	1.3 km	MPC · JPL
878190	2011 UW_{397}	—	October 22, 2011	Mount Lemmon	Mount Lemmon Survey	GEF	850 m	MPC · JPL
878191	2011 UH_{407}	—	October 2, 2011	Piszkéstető	K. Sárneczky	·	1.2 km	MPC · JPL
878192	2011 UE_{414}	—	October 20, 2011	Mount Lemmon	Mount Lemmon Survey	·	1.1 km	MPC · JPL
878193	2011 UN_{419}	—	October 24, 2011	Haleakala	Pan-STARRS 1	·	1.1 km	MPC · JPL
878194	2011 UM_{426}	—	June 28, 2015	Haleakala	Pan-STARRS 1	·	1.4 km	MPC · JPL
878195	2011 UV_{428}	—	October 23, 2011	Mount Lemmon	Mount Lemmon Survey	·	1.7 km	MPC · JPL
878196	2011 UY_{428}	—	October 26, 2011	Mayhill-ISON	L. Elenin	·	1.3 km	MPC · JPL
878197	2011 UF_{431}	—	October 25, 2011	Haleakala	Pan-STARRS 1	·	600 m	MPC · JPL
878198	2011 UD_{432}	—	October 25, 2011	Haleakala	Pan-STARRS 1	·	1.1 km	MPC · JPL
878199	2011 UJ_{434}	—	October 18, 2011	Kitt Peak	Spacewatch	·	500 m	MPC · JPL
878200	2011 US_{434}	—	October 23, 2011	Haleakala	Pan-STARRS 1	·	780 m	MPC · JPL

== 878201–878300 ==
back to top

Designation			Discovery			Properties		Ref
Permanent	Provisional	Named after	Date	Site	Discoverer(s)	Category	Diam.	Ref
878201	2011 UZ_{434}	—	September 23, 2011	Haleakala	Pan-STARRS 1	·	520 m	MPC · JPL
878202	2011 UO_{438}	—	October 19, 2011	Haleakala	Pan-STARRS 1	critical	720 m	MPC · JPL
878203	2011 UN_{443}	—	October 24, 2011	Haleakala	Pan-STARRS 1	·	550 m	MPC · JPL
878204	2011 UQ_{444}	—	October 24, 2011	Haleakala	Pan-STARRS 1	·	1.0 km	MPC · JPL
878205	2011 UE_{452}	—	October 26, 2011	Haleakala	Pan-STARRS 1	·	1.1 km	MPC · JPL
878206	2011 UH_{454}	—	October 31, 2011	Mount Lemmon	Mount Lemmon Survey	EOS	1.4 km	MPC · JPL
878207	2011 UU_{454}	—	October 25, 2011	Haleakala	Pan-STARRS 1	·	1.3 km	MPC · JPL
878208	2011 UZ_{454}	—	October 27, 2011	Catalina	CSS	·	1.2 km	MPC · JPL
878209	2011 UP_{458}	—	September 23, 2011	Catalina	CSS	·	1.1 km	MPC · JPL
878210	2011 UK_{459}	—	October 19, 2011	Mount Lemmon	Mount Lemmon Survey	·	1.2 km	MPC · JPL
878211	2011 UM_{459}	—	October 24, 2011	Haleakala	Pan-STARRS 1	MRX	560 m	MPC · JPL
878212	2011 UT_{460}	—	October 31, 2011	Mayhill-ISON	L. Elenin	·	1.3 km	MPC · JPL
878213	2011 UU_{460}	—	October 24, 2011	Haleakala	Pan-STARRS 1	·	1.4 km	MPC · JPL
878214	2011 UP_{462}	—	October 23, 2011	Kitt Peak	Spacewatch	·	1.3 km	MPC · JPL
878215	2011 UX_{462}	—	October 24, 2011	Mount Lemmon	Mount Lemmon Survey	·	1.2 km	MPC · JPL
878216	2011 UV_{464}	—	October 26, 2011	Haleakala	Pan-STARRS 1	·	1.4 km	MPC · JPL
878217	2011 UD_{467}	—	October 19, 2011	Mount Lemmon	Mount Lemmon Survey	·	1.0 km	MPC · JPL
878218	2011 UM_{467}	—	October 29, 2011	Haleakala	Pan-STARRS 1	·	1.1 km	MPC · JPL
878219	2011 UT_{480}	—	October 21, 2011	Kitt Peak	Spacewatch	·	1.5 km	MPC · JPL
878220	2011 UP_{487}	—	October 22, 2011	Mount Lemmon	Mount Lemmon Survey	·	1.1 km	MPC · JPL
878221	2011 UA_{490}	—	October 24, 2011	Haleakala	Pan-STARRS 1	LUT	2.3 km	MPC · JPL
878222	2011 UK_{491}	—	October 19, 2011	Haleakala	Pan-STARRS 1	HNS	730 m	MPC · JPL
878223	2011 US_{491}	—	October 24, 2011	Haleakala	Pan-STARRS 1	HNS	710 m	MPC · JPL
878224	2011 UV_{494}	—	October 31, 2011	Mount Lemmon	Mount Lemmon Survey	·	1.7 km	MPC · JPL
878225	2011 UG_{506}	—	October 24, 2011	Haleakala	Pan-STARRS 1	·	3.0 km	MPC · JPL
878226	2011 VK_{1}	—	September 14, 2002	Anderson Mesa	LONEOS	·	1.8 km	MPC · JPL
878227	2011 VF_{2}	—	October 18, 2011	Catalina	CSS	·	630 m	MPC · JPL
878228	2011 VR_{5}	—	November 3, 2011	Mount Lemmon	Mount Lemmon Survey	AMO +1km	3.1 km	MPC · JPL
878229	2011 VZ_{14}	—	October 30, 2011	Kitt Peak	Spacewatch	·	1.3 km	MPC · JPL
878230	2011 VC_{17}	—	November 15, 2011	Mount Lemmon	Mount Lemmon Survey	·	1.6 km	MPC · JPL
878231	2011 VN_{19}	—	November 15, 2011	Catalina	CSS	·	1.4 km	MPC · JPL
878232	2011 VW_{30}	—	November 3, 2011	Mount Lemmon	Mount Lemmon Survey	PHO	640 m	MPC · JPL
878233	2011 VL_{31}	—	November 2, 2011	Mount Lemmon	Mount Lemmon Survey	·	1.2 km	MPC · JPL
878234	2011 VQ_{31}	—	November 2, 2011	Mount Lemmon	Mount Lemmon Survey	GEF	660 m	MPC · JPL
878235	2011 VT_{31}	—	November 2, 2011	Mount Lemmon	Mount Lemmon Survey	DOR	1.3 km	MPC · JPL
878236	2011 VU_{31}	—	November 5, 2011	Haleakala	Pan-STARRS 1	·	1.4 km	MPC · JPL
878237	2011 VO_{32}	—	November 3, 2011	Kitt Peak	Spacewatch	·	1.4 km	MPC · JPL
878238	2011 WQ	—	November 16, 2011	Mount Lemmon	Mount Lemmon Survey	·	1.1 km	MPC · JPL
878239	2011 WJ_{6}	—	November 3, 2011	Kitt Peak	Spacewatch	·	1.2 km	MPC · JPL
878240	2011 WP_{17}	—	October 22, 2011	Kitt Peak	Spacewatch	·	1.3 km	MPC · JPL
878241	2011 WE_{18}	—	September 23, 2011	Kitt Peak	Spacewatch	·	1.2 km	MPC · JPL
878242	2011 WR_{24}	—	November 23, 2011	Mount Lemmon	Mount Lemmon Survey	·	2.1 km	MPC · JPL
878243	2011 WH_{27}	—	November 18, 2011	Mount Lemmon	Mount Lemmon Survey	·	1.1 km	MPC · JPL
878244	2011 WR_{28}	—	September 29, 2011	Catalina	CSS	·	600 m	MPC · JPL
878245	2011 WN_{39}	—	November 15, 2011	Mount Lemmon	Mount Lemmon Survey	MRX	700 m	MPC · JPL
878246	2011 WV_{42}	—	November 23, 2011	Mount Lemmon	Mount Lemmon Survey	·	1.3 km	MPC · JPL
878247	2011 WW_{44}	—	November 17, 2011	Kitt Peak	Spacewatch	AEO	780 m	MPC · JPL
878248	2011 WY_{52}	—	November 24, 2011	Piszkés-tető	K. Sárneczky, G. Marton	GEF	730 m	MPC · JPL
878249	2011 WH_{56}	—	September 27, 2011	Mount Lemmon	Mount Lemmon Survey	·	630 m	MPC · JPL
878250	2011 WR_{60}	—	October 26, 2011	Haleakala	Pan-STARRS 1	·	1.1 km	MPC · JPL
878251	2011 WX_{63}	—	November 18, 2011	Mount Lemmon	Mount Lemmon Survey	·	720 m	MPC · JPL
878252	2011 WO_{71}	—	November 14, 2007	Kitt Peak	Spacewatch	·	650 m	MPC · JPL
878253	2011 WT_{75}	—	October 24, 2011	Haleakala	Pan-STARRS 1	·	1.2 km	MPC · JPL
878254	2011 WK_{76}	—	October 1, 2011	Mount Lemmon	Mount Lemmon Survey	·	1.3 km	MPC · JPL
878255	2011 WL_{77}	—	July 25, 2015	Haleakala	Pan-STARRS 1	·	1.3 km	MPC · JPL
878256	2011 WC_{79}	—	October 24, 2011	Haleakala	Pan-STARRS 1	·	1.1 km	MPC · JPL
878257	2011 WL_{81}	—	September 19, 2006	Kitt Peak	Spacewatch	·	1.5 km	MPC · JPL
878258	2011 WT_{86}	—	November 24, 2011	Haleakala	Pan-STARRS 1	LIX	2.1 km	MPC · JPL
878259	2011 WT_{93}	—	November 9, 2007	Kitt Peak	Spacewatch	·	730 m	MPC · JPL
878260	2011 WZ_{95}	—	November 30, 2011	Haleakala	Pan-STARRS 1	·	440 m	MPC · JPL
878261	2011 WO_{96}	—	October 20, 2011	Mount Lemmon	Mount Lemmon Survey	·	1.1 km	MPC · JPL
878262	2011 WP_{96}	—	November 24, 2011	Haleakala	Pan-STARRS 1	·	1.3 km	MPC · JPL
878263	2011 WJ_{102}	—	October 26, 2011	Haleakala	Pan-STARRS 1	·	1.5 km	MPC · JPL
878264	2011 WW_{108}	—	November 22, 2011	Haleakala	Pan-STARRS 1	·	1.3 km	MPC · JPL
878265	2011 WT_{116}	—	October 20, 2011	Mount Lemmon	Mount Lemmon Survey	·	1.5 km	MPC · JPL
878266	2011 WU_{116}	—	October 18, 2011	Mount Lemmon	Mount Lemmon Survey	·	810 m	MPC · JPL
878267	2011 WQ_{121}	—	October 18, 2011	Mount Lemmon	Mount Lemmon Survey	·	660 m	MPC · JPL
878268	2011 WT_{128}	—	November 17, 2011	Mount Lemmon	Mount Lemmon Survey	·	1.0 km	MPC · JPL
878269	2011 WZ_{145}	—	November 18, 2007	Kitt Peak	Spacewatch	·	630 m	MPC · JPL
878270	2011 WZ_{146}	—	November 27, 2011	Kitt Peak	Spacewatch	·	1.1 km	MPC · JPL
878271	2011 WE_{163}	—	November 18, 2011	Mount Lemmon	Mount Lemmon Survey	·	1.2 km	MPC · JPL
878272	2011 WW_{164}	—	November 30, 2011	Mount Lemmon	Mount Lemmon Survey	(5)	730 m	MPC · JPL
878273	2011 WL_{165}	—	November 23, 2011	Kitt Peak	Spacewatch	·	800 m	MPC · JPL
878274	2011 WT_{165}	—	November 30, 2011	Mount Lemmon	Mount Lemmon Survey	PHO	730 m	MPC · JPL
878275	2011 WH_{167}	—	May 28, 2014	Mount Lemmon	Mount Lemmon Survey	·	1.0 km	MPC · JPL
878276	2011 WY_{168}	—	November 17, 2011	Mount Lemmon	Mount Lemmon Survey	·	690 m	MPC · JPL
878277	2011 WT_{170}	—	November 29, 2011	Mount Lemmon	Mount Lemmon Survey	H	410 m	MPC · JPL
878278	2011 WC_{175}	—	November 28, 2011	Kitt Peak	Spacewatch	·	710 m	MPC · JPL
878279	2011 WL_{175}	—	November 28, 2011	Haleakala	Pan-STARRS 1	H	600 m	MPC · JPL
878280	2011 WX_{177}	—	November 16, 2011	Catalina	CSS	·	1.5 km	MPC · JPL
878281	2011 WC_{178}	—	November 24, 2011	Mount Lemmon	Mount Lemmon Survey	·	1.3 km	MPC · JPL
878282	2011 WR_{178}	—	November 17, 2011	Mount Lemmon	Mount Lemmon Survey	·	1.4 km	MPC · JPL
878283	2011 WO_{185}	—	November 30, 2011	Mount Lemmon	Mount Lemmon Survey	GEF	800 m	MPC · JPL
878284	2011 WW_{185}	—	November 24, 2011	Mount Lemmon	Mount Lemmon Survey	·	1.3 km	MPC · JPL
878285	2011 XC	—	June 2, 1998	Kitt Peak	Spacewatch	AMO	230 m	MPC · JPL
878286	2011 XS_{3}	—	December 6, 2011	Haleakala	Pan-STARRS 1	DOR	1.7 km	MPC · JPL
878287	2011 XL_{4}	—	December 6, 2011	Haleakala	Pan-STARRS 1	EUN	670 m	MPC · JPL
878288	2011 XY_{5}	—	March 7, 2008	Catalina	CSS	·	1.4 km	MPC · JPL
878289	2011 XL_{6}	—	December 1, 2011	Haleakala	Pan-STARRS 1	·	1.5 km	MPC · JPL
878290	2011 XF_{7}	—	December 6, 2011	Haleakala	Pan-STARRS 1	·	2.4 km	MPC · JPL
878291	2011 YP_{1}	—	December 18, 2011	Socorro	LINEAR	·	650 m	MPC · JPL
878292	2011 YL_{5}	—	December 24, 2011	Mount Lemmon	Mount Lemmon Survey	·	1.4 km	MPC · JPL
878293	2011 YX_{10}	—	December 25, 2011	Mount Lemmon	Mount Lemmon Survey	ATE	170 m	MPC · JPL
878294	2011 YO_{13}	—	December 25, 2011	Mount Lemmon	Mount Lemmon Survey	·	1.5 km	MPC · JPL
878295	2011 YG_{15}	—	December 26, 2011	Kitt Peak	Spacewatch	·	430 m	MPC · JPL
878296	2011 YB_{55}	—	December 29, 2011	Kitt Peak	Spacewatch	·	1.4 km	MPC · JPL
878297	2011 YK_{55}	—	December 31, 2007	Kitt Peak	Spacewatch	·	980 m	MPC · JPL
878298	2011 YM_{59}	—	December 29, 2011	Kitt Peak	Spacewatch	·	1.2 km	MPC · JPL
878299	2011 YM_{62}	—	December 30, 2011	Mount Lemmon	Mount Lemmon Survey	·	1.4 km	MPC · JPL
878300	2011 YU_{62}	—	December 29, 2011	Siding Spring	SSS	T_{j} (2.84) · APO +1km	1.1 km	MPC · JPL

== 878301–878400 ==
back to top

Designation			Discovery			Properties		Ref
Permanent	Provisional	Named after	Date	Site	Discoverer(s)	Category	Diam.	Ref
878301	2011 YV_{73}	—	November 9, 2007	Mount Lemmon	Mount Lemmon Survey	·	990 m	MPC · JPL
878302	2011 YD_{85}	—	December 24, 2011	Mount Lemmon	Mount Lemmon Survey	·	1.2 km	MPC · JPL
878303	2011 YE_{93}	—	December 25, 2011	Kitt Peak	Spacewatch	·	920 m	MPC · JPL
878304	2011 YP_{93}	—	December 29, 2011	Mount Lemmon	Mount Lemmon Survey	·	1.3 km	MPC · JPL
878305	2011 YR_{94}	—	December 29, 2011	Kitt Peak	Spacewatch	critical	890 m	MPC · JPL
878306	2012 AP_{7}	—	October 22, 2008	Siding Spring	SSS	·	360 m	MPC · JPL
878307	2012 AN_{8}	—	January 15, 2005	Kitt Peak	Spacewatch	·	690 m	MPC · JPL
878308	2012 AJ_{32}	—	January 2, 2012	Mount Lemmon	Mount Lemmon Survey	·	510 m	MPC · JPL
878309	2012 AB_{33}	—	January 1, 2012	Mount Lemmon	Mount Lemmon Survey	KON	1.5 km	MPC · JPL
878310	2012 BM_{1}	—	October 9, 1993	La Silla	E. W. Elst	·	800 m	MPC · JPL
878311	2012 BB_{25}	—	January 4, 2012	Mount Lemmon	Mount Lemmon Survey	·	790 m	MPC · JPL
878312	2012 BW_{43}	—	January 19, 2012	Mount Lemmon	Mount Lemmon Survey	·	820 m	MPC · JPL
878313	2012 BR_{64}	—	December 31, 2011	Kitt Peak	Spacewatch	·	1.3 km	MPC · JPL
878314	2012 BP_{72}	—	January 21, 2012	Kitt Peak	Spacewatch	PHO	770 m	MPC · JPL
878315	2012 BP_{75}	—	January 26, 2012	Mount Lemmon	Mount Lemmon Survey	·	780 m	MPC · JPL
878316	2012 BO_{76}	—	January 26, 2012	Haleakala	Pan-STARRS 1	3:2 · SHU	3.7 km	MPC · JPL
878317	2012 BT_{79}	—	January 27, 2012	Mount Lemmon	Mount Lemmon Survey	·	1.2 km	MPC · JPL
878318	2012 BC_{81}	—	January 27, 2012	Mount Lemmon	Mount Lemmon Survey	CLO	1.6 km	MPC · JPL
878319	2012 BP_{89}	—	December 27, 2011	Mount Lemmon	Mount Lemmon Survey	·	650 m	MPC · JPL
878320	2012 BC_{93}	—	January 14, 2012	Kitt Peak	Spacewatch	·	1.2 km	MPC · JPL
878321	2012 BS_{95}	—	December 28, 2011	Catalina	CSS	·	750 m	MPC · JPL
878322	2012 BM_{123}	—	January 2, 2012	Mount Lemmon	Mount Lemmon Survey	·	1.3 km	MPC · JPL
878323	2012 BM_{141}	—	September 5, 1994	La Silla	E. W. Elst	EOS	2.5 km	MPC · JPL
878324	2012 BD_{152}	—	January 26, 2012	Mount Lemmon	Mount Lemmon Survey	·	1.4 km	MPC · JPL
878325	2012 BY_{166}	—	January 30, 2012	Catalina	CSS	·	850 m	MPC · JPL
878326	2012 BH_{167}	—	December 13, 2015	Haleakala	Pan-STARRS 1	·	710 m	MPC · JPL
878327	2012 BP_{167}	—	March 18, 2018	Haleakala	Pan-STARRS 1	·	1.2 km	MPC · JPL
878328	2012 BN_{173}	—	January 18, 2012	Kitt Peak	Spacewatch	·	1.4 km	MPC · JPL
878329	2012 BV_{174}	—	January 18, 2012	Mount Lemmon	Mount Lemmon Survey	MAR	660 m	MPC · JPL
878330	2012 BE_{177}	—	January 27, 2012	Mount Lemmon	Mount Lemmon Survey	·	930 m	MPC · JPL
878331	2012 BL_{180}	—	January 27, 2012	Mount Lemmon	Mount Lemmon Survey	·	850 m	MPC · JPL
878332	2012 CD_{21}	—	January 18, 2012	Mount Lemmon	Mount Lemmon Survey	PHO	560 m	MPC · JPL
878333	2012 CB_{28}	—	February 13, 2012	Haleakala	Pan-STARRS 1	·	1.7 km	MPC · JPL
878334	2012 CX_{29}	—	September 19, 1998	Sacramento Peak	SDSS	·	1.9 km	MPC · JPL
878335	2012 CA_{58}	—	February 13, 2012	Haleakala	Pan-STARRS 1	·	1.5 km	MPC · JPL
878336	2012 CN_{61}	—	February 14, 2012	Haleakala	Pan-STARRS 1	(13314)	1.2 km	MPC · JPL
878337	2012 CD_{62}	—	February 3, 2012	Mount Lemmon	Mount Lemmon Survey	BRG	930 m	MPC · JPL
878338	2012 CV_{67}	—	February 3, 2012	Haleakala	Pan-STARRS 1	·	1.8 km	MPC · JPL
878339	2012 DB_{9}	—	January 29, 2012	Kitt Peak	Spacewatch	·	1.4 km	MPC · JPL
878340	2012 DJ_{11}	—	January 19, 2012	Kitt Peak	Spacewatch	·	740 m	MPC · JPL
878341	2012 DC_{15}	—	February 19, 2012	Kitt Peak	Spacewatch	·	1.4 km	MPC · JPL
878342	2012 DP_{16}	—	February 21, 2012	Mount Lemmon	Mount Lemmon Survey	H	360 m	MPC · JPL
878343	2012 DE_{19}	—	March 25, 2007	Mount Lemmon	Mount Lemmon Survey	·	1.3 km	MPC · JPL
878344	2012 DY_{22}	—	April 16, 1996	Haleakala	AMOS	·	1.7 km	MPC · JPL
878345	2012 DO_{32}	—	February 25, 2012	Kitt Peak	Spacewatch	·	720 m	MPC · JPL
878346	2012 DK_{44}	—	February 1, 2012	Mount Lemmon	Mount Lemmon Survey	·	1.8 km	MPC · JPL
878347	2012 DG_{56}	—	February 13, 2012	Haleakala	Pan-STARRS 1	·	770 m	MPC · JPL
878348	2012 DN_{86}	—	January 26, 2012	Catalina	CSS	PHO	1.0 km	MPC · JPL
878349	2012 DB_{104}	—	February 27, 2012	Haleakala	Pan-STARRS 1	·	1.4 km	MPC · JPL
878350	2012 DK_{105}	—	February 28, 2012	Haleakala	Pan-STARRS 1	·	1.5 km	MPC · JPL
878351	2012 DD_{114}	—	July 1, 2014	Haleakala	Pan-STARRS 1	·	1.4 km	MPC · JPL
878352	2012 DB_{128}	—	February 25, 2012	Mount Lemmon	Mount Lemmon Survey	·	1.2 km	MPC · JPL
878353	2012 EQ_{17}	—	March 13, 2012	Mount Lemmon	Mount Lemmon Survey	H	390 m	MPC · JPL
878354	2012 EW_{18}	—	February 29, 2012	Mount Lemmon	Mount Lemmon Survey	·	2.0 km	MPC · JPL
878355	2012 ER_{21}	—	March 4, 2012	Mount Lemmon	Mount Lemmon Survey	·	1.6 km	MPC · JPL
878356	2012 EE_{22}	—	March 14, 2012	Mount Lemmon	Mount Lemmon Survey	·	1.9 km	MPC · JPL
878357	2012 EZ_{25}	—	March 15, 2012	Kitt Peak	Spacewatch	3:2	3.5 km	MPC · JPL
878358	2012 EJ_{26}	—	March 15, 2012	Mount Lemmon	Mount Lemmon Survey	·	2.2 km	MPC · JPL
878359	2012 ER_{28}	—	March 13, 2012	Haleakala	Pan-STARRS 1	·	1.1 km	MPC · JPL
878360	2012 FU_{2}	—	March 26, 2007	Kitt Peak	Spacewatch	·	1.4 km	MPC · JPL
878361	2012 FQ_{4}	—	March 15, 2012	Mount Lemmon	Mount Lemmon Survey	ADE	1.2 km	MPC · JPL
878362	2012 FJ_{20}	—	March 17, 2012	Mount Lemmon	Mount Lemmon Survey	·	820 m	MPC · JPL
878363	2012 FT_{26}	—	February 22, 2012	Kitt Peak	Spacewatch	·	2.5 km	MPC · JPL
878364	2012 FW_{55}	—	March 25, 2012	Mount Lemmon	Mount Lemmon Survey	·	440 m	MPC · JPL
878365	2012 FA_{56}	—	March 25, 2012	Mount Lemmon	Mount Lemmon Survey	·	1.2 km	MPC · JPL
878366	2012 FY_{60}	—	March 16, 2012	Kitt Peak	Spacewatch	3:2	3.9 km	MPC · JPL
878367	2012 FW_{65}	—	February 1, 2012	Mount Lemmon	Mount Lemmon Survey	·	1.2 km	MPC · JPL
878368	2012 FL_{91}	—	March 27, 2012	Mount Lemmon	Mount Lemmon Survey	·	1.3 km	MPC · JPL
878369	2012 FK_{100}	—	March 20, 2012	Haleakala	Pan-STARRS 1	EOS	1.4 km	MPC · JPL
878370	2012 FD_{105}	—	March 29, 2012	Mount Lemmon	Mount Lemmon Survey	·	1.1 km	MPC · JPL
878371	2012 FA_{114}	—	March 20, 2007	Mount Lemmon	Mount Lemmon Survey	·	1.5 km	MPC · JPL
878372	2012 FL_{114}	—	March 31, 2012	Mount Lemmon	Mount Lemmon Survey	·	1.6 km	MPC · JPL
878373	2012 FS_{116}	—	March 31, 2012	Kitt Peak	Spacewatch	·	2.0 km	MPC · JPL
878374	2012 FT_{116}	—	March 25, 2012	Mount Lemmon	Mount Lemmon Survey	·	1.7 km	MPC · JPL
878375	2012 GS_{3}	—	February 25, 2012	Mount Lemmon	Mount Lemmon Survey	T_{j} (2.99) · 3:2	3.8 km	MPC · JPL
878376	2012 GX_{45}	—	April 15, 2012	Haleakala	Pan-STARRS 1	·	2.0 km	MPC · JPL
878377	2012 GF_{46}	—	April 15, 2012	Haleakala	Pan-STARRS 1	·	1.2 km	MPC · JPL
878378	2012 HD_{1}	—	March 5, 2008	Mount Lemmon	Mount Lemmon Survey	·	1.3 km	MPC · JPL
878379	2012 HR_{5}	—	April 3, 2008	Kitt Peak	Spacewatch	·	740 m	MPC · JPL
878380	2012 HK_{10}	—	April 1, 2012	Haleakala	Pan-STARRS 1	TIR	2.3 km	MPC · JPL
878381	2012 HF_{13}	—	March 28, 2012	Mount Lemmon	Mount Lemmon Survey	·	1.1 km	MPC · JPL
878382	2012 HD_{28}	—	March 27, 2012	Kitt Peak	Spacewatch	·	2.1 km	MPC · JPL
878383	2012 HD_{31}	—	April 18, 2007	Kitt Peak	Spacewatch	H	450 m	MPC · JPL
878384	2012 HG_{31}	—	April 15, 2012	Haleakala	Pan-STARRS 1	AMO · PHA	580 m	MPC · JPL
878385	2012 HH_{32}	—	April 21, 2012	Kitt Peak	Spacewatch	·	2.0 km	MPC · JPL
878386	2012 HS_{45}	—	March 15, 2012	Mount Lemmon	Mount Lemmon Survey	·	2.2 km	MPC · JPL
878387	2012 HZ_{90}	—	April 20, 2012	Mount Lemmon	Mount Lemmon Survey	·	2.4 km	MPC · JPL
878388	2012 HH_{93}	—	April 16, 2012	Haleakala	Pan-STARRS 1	·	1.5 km	MPC · JPL
878389	2012 HL_{94}	—	April 27, 2012	Haleakala	Pan-STARRS 1	·	1.7 km	MPC · JPL
878390	2012 HG_{98}	—	April 18, 2012	Kitt Peak	Spacewatch	·	760 m	MPC · JPL
878391	2012 HS_{99}	—	April 19, 2012	Kitt Peak	Spacewatch	·	2.2 km	MPC · JPL
878392	2012 HR_{117}	—	April 28, 2012	Mount Lemmon	Mount Lemmon Survey	JUN	570 m	MPC · JPL
878393	2012 JL_{4}	—	May 1, 2012	Mount Lemmon	Mount Lemmon Survey	H	330 m	MPC · JPL
878394	2012 JY_{5}	—	December 30, 2007	Kitt Peak	Spacewatch	PHO	620 m	MPC · JPL
878395	2012 JV_{32}	—	May 12, 2012	Haleakala	Pan-STARRS 1	·	2.0 km	MPC · JPL
878396	2012 JX_{35}	—	May 15, 2012	Haleakala	Pan-STARRS 1	·	2.4 km	MPC · JPL
878397	2012 JS_{36}	—	April 30, 2012	Mount Lemmon	Mount Lemmon Survey	·	2.0 km	MPC · JPL
878398	2012 JV_{39}	—	May 12, 2012	Mount Lemmon	Mount Lemmon Survey	THM	1.7 km	MPC · JPL
878399	2012 JZ_{56}	—	May 12, 2012	Mount Lemmon	Mount Lemmon Survey	·	1.7 km	MPC · JPL
878400	2012 JK_{69}	—	May 1, 2012	Mount Lemmon	Mount Lemmon Survey	·	2.1 km	MPC · JPL

== 878401–878500 ==
back to top

Designation			Discovery			Properties		Ref
Permanent	Provisional	Named after	Date	Site	Discoverer(s)	Category	Diam.	Ref
878401	2012 JZ_{69}	—	July 10, 2018	Haleakala	Pan-STARRS 1	·	1.7 km	MPC · JPL
878402	2012 JE_{71}	—	May 13, 2012	Mount Lemmon	Mount Lemmon Survey	·	2.2 km	MPC · JPL
878403	2012 KM	—	May 16, 2012	Haleakala	Pan-STARRS 1	H	310 m	MPC · JPL
878404	2012 KV_{3}	—	May 17, 2012	Mount Lemmon	Mount Lemmon Survey	·	1.5 km	MPC · JPL
878405	2012 KB_{7}	—	May 19, 2012	Haleakala	Pan-STARRS 1	H	360 m	MPC · JPL
878406	2012 KV_{15}	—	April 25, 2012	Mount Lemmon	Mount Lemmon Survey	BAR	940 m	MPC · JPL
878407	2012 KQ_{23}	—	May 20, 2012	Kitt Peak	Spacewatch	·	1.7 km	MPC · JPL
878408	2012 KC_{26}	—	March 28, 2012	Kitt Peak	Spacewatch	·	1.4 km	MPC · JPL
878409	2012 KP_{28}	—	April 28, 2012	Kitt Peak	Spacewatch	H	270 m	MPC · JPL
878410	2012 KH_{45}	—	October 25, 2008	Kitt Peak	Spacewatch	·	320 m	MPC · JPL
878411	2012 KR_{55}	—	May 21, 2012	Mount Lemmon	Mount Lemmon Survey	·	820 m	MPC · JPL
878412	2012 KD_{56}	—	May 23, 2012	Kitt Peak	Spacewatch	·	710 m	MPC · JPL
878413	2012 KW_{56}	—	November 17, 2014	Haleakala	Pan-STARRS 1	·	2.2 km	MPC · JPL
878414	2012 KJ_{60}	—	May 21, 2012	Mount Lemmon	Mount Lemmon Survey	·	2.2 km	MPC · JPL
878415	2012 KH_{62}	—	May 27, 2012	Mount Lemmon	Mount Lemmon Survey	·	2.1 km	MPC · JPL
878416	2012 KE_{64}	—	May 27, 2012	Mount Lemmon	Mount Lemmon Survey	·	730 m	MPC · JPL
878417	2012 KG_{64}	—	May 21, 2012	Mount Lemmon	Mount Lemmon Survey	RAF	530 m	MPC · JPL
878418	2012 KT_{65}	—	May 21, 2012	Mount Lemmon	Mount Lemmon Survey	·	1.9 km	MPC · JPL
878419	2012 KF_{67}	—	May 28, 2012	Mount Lemmon	Mount Lemmon Survey	·	1.6 km	MPC · JPL
878420	2012 LR_{1}	—	June 9, 2012	Haleakala	Pan-STARRS 1	APO · PHA	280 m	MPC · JPL
878421	2012 LK_{2}	—	June 10, 2012	Haleakala	Pan-STARRS 1	T_{j} (2.87) · APO +1km	1.6 km	MPC · JPL
878422	2012 LQ_{5}	—	June 13, 2012	Haleakala	Pan-STARRS 1	·	660 m	MPC · JPL
878423	2012 LT_{5}	—	October 15, 2009	La Sagra	OAM	·	430 m	MPC · JPL
878424	2012 LU_{31}	—	June 12, 2012	Haleakala	Pan-STARRS 1	·	750 m	MPC · JPL
878425	2012 LV_{32}	—	June 8, 2012	Mount Lemmon	Mount Lemmon Survey	·	900 m	MPC · JPL
878426	2012 MM	—	June 16, 2012	Mount Lemmon	Mount Lemmon Survey	H	330 m	MPC · JPL
878427	2012 MT	—	May 12, 2012	Mount Lemmon	Mount Lemmon Survey	·	1.8 km	MPC · JPL
878428	2012 MV_{1}	—	June 16, 2012	Mount Lemmon	Mount Lemmon Survey	BAR	1.3 km	MPC · JPL
878429	2012 MG_{3}	—	October 30, 2002	Sacramento Peak	SDSS	·	820 m	MPC · JPL
878430	2012 MC_{19}	—	June 17, 2012	Mount Lemmon	Mount Lemmon Survey	·	1.0 km	MPC · JPL
878431	2012 MH_{19}	—	June 19, 2012	ESA OGS	ESA OGS	·	1.0 km	MPC · JPL
878432	2012 MZ_{19}	—	June 21, 2012	Mount Lemmon	Mount Lemmon Survey	·	1.4 km	MPC · JPL
878433	2012 OM_{6}	—	July 21, 2012	Siding Spring	SSS	·	2.7 km	MPC · JPL
878434	2012 PW_{1}	—	August 8, 2012	Haleakala	Pan-STARRS 1	3:2	3.9 km	MPC · JPL
878435	2012 PQ_{5}	—	August 7, 2012	Haleakala	Pan-STARRS 1	·	1.2 km	MPC · JPL
878436	2012 PN_{9}	—	August 8, 2012	Haleakala	Pan-STARRS 1	·	1.4 km	MPC · JPL
878437	2012 PV_{15}	—	August 11, 2012	Haleakala	Pan-STARRS 1	L5	5.7 km	MPC · JPL
878438	2012 PT_{16}	—	May 27, 2012	Mount Lemmon	Mount Lemmon Survey	·	1 km	MPC · JPL
878439	2012 PX_{26}	—	August 13, 2012	Haleakala	Pan-STARRS 1	·	1.1 km	MPC · JPL
878440	2012 PJ_{35}	—	August 11, 2012	Siding Spring	SSS	(194)	1.3 km	MPC · JPL
878441	2012 PC_{39}	—	January 16, 2009	Mount Lemmon	Mount Lemmon Survey	·	2.4 km	MPC · JPL
878442	2012 PN_{46}	—	August 4, 2012	Haleakala	Pan-STARRS 1	·	1.0 km	MPC · JPL
878443	2012 PR_{47}	—	August 11, 2012	Siding Spring	SSS	·	1.1 km	MPC · JPL
878444	2012 PG_{48}	—	August 10, 2012	Kitt Peak	Spacewatch	·	770 m	MPC · JPL
878445	2012 PN_{48}	—	August 14, 2012	Haleakala	Pan-STARRS 1	·	1.2 km	MPC · JPL
878446	2012 PB_{50}	—	July 28, 2012	Haleakala	Pan-STARRS 1	·	1.4 km	MPC · JPL
878447	2012 PZ_{53}	—	August 14, 2012	Siding Spring	SSS	·	580 m	MPC · JPL
878448	2012 PN_{54}	—	August 13, 2012	Haleakala	Pan-STARRS 1	·	720 m	MPC · JPL
878449	2012 PD_{55}	—	August 13, 2012	Haleakala	Pan-STARRS 1	THM	1.5 km	MPC · JPL
878450	2012 PP_{55}	—	August 13, 2012	Haleakala	Pan-STARRS 1	·	800 m	MPC · JPL
878451	2012 PH_{57}	—	August 13, 2012	Haleakala	Pan-STARRS 1	·	2.3 km	MPC · JPL
878452	2012 PM_{57}	—	August 8, 2012	Haleakala	Pan-STARRS 1	·	1.1 km	MPC · JPL
878453	2012 PO_{60}	—	August 14, 2012	Kitt Peak	Spacewatch	·	930 m	MPC · JPL
878454	2012 QU_{8}	—	August 13, 2012	Haleakala	Pan-STARRS 1	·	2.0 km	MPC · JPL
878455	2012 QB_{16}	—	August 22, 2012	Haleakala	Pan-STARRS 1	·	1.0 km	MPC · JPL
878456	2012 QY_{16}	—	January 2, 2009	Catalina	CSS	·	1.2 km	MPC · JPL
878457	2012 QG_{21}	—	August 24, 2012	Kitt Peak	Spacewatch	·	900 m	MPC · JPL
878458	2012 QO_{27}	—	September 23, 2008	Kitt Peak	Spacewatch	(5)	770 m	MPC · JPL
878459	2012 QY_{39}	—	July 19, 2012	Siding Spring	SSS	·	1.4 km	MPC · JPL
878460	2012 QO_{43}	—	October 30, 2017	Haleakala	Pan-STARRS 1	·	950 m	MPC · JPL
878461	2012 QY_{49}	—	July 18, 2012	Catalina	CSS	·	1.3 km	MPC · JPL
878462	2012 QR_{57}	—	August 26, 2012	Haleakala	Pan-STARRS 1	·	1.6 km	MPC · JPL
878463	2012 QW_{63}	—	August 17, 2012	Haleakala	Pan-STARRS 1	·	2.0 km	MPC · JPL
878464	2012 QA_{73}	—	August 17, 2012	Haleakala	Pan-STARRS 1	·	830 m	MPC · JPL
878465	2012 QM_{73}	—	August 26, 2012	Haleakala	Pan-STARRS 1	·	980 m	MPC · JPL
878466	2012 QE_{74}	—	August 25, 2012	Kitt Peak	Spacewatch	·	840 m	MPC · JPL
878467	2012 QK_{74}	—	August 26, 2012	Haleakala	Pan-STARRS 1	·	1 km	MPC · JPL
878468	2012 QP_{77}	—	August 26, 2012	Haleakala	Pan-STARRS 1	·	1.5 km	MPC · JPL
878469	2012 QL_{84}	—	August 26, 2012	Haleakala	Pan-STARRS 1	·	2.0 km	MPC · JPL
878470	2012 QN_{85}	—	August 17, 2012	Haleakala	Pan-STARRS 1	·	900 m	MPC · JPL
878471	2012 RC	—	September 4, 2012	Haleakala	Pan-STARRS 1	H	390 m	MPC · JPL
878472	2012 RY_{2}	—	September 28, 2008	Mount Lemmon	Mount Lemmon Survey	·	1.1 km	MPC · JPL
878473	2012 RS_{15}	—	September 13, 2012	La Sagra	OAM	·	510 m	MPC · JPL
878474	2012 RC_{25}	—	September 14, 2012	ESA OGS	ESA OGS	ADE	1.4 km	MPC · JPL
878475	2012 RO_{26}	—	August 26, 2012	Catalina	CSS	·	950 m	MPC · JPL
878476	2012 RM_{27}	—	September 6, 2012	Haleakala	Pan-STARRS 1	BRG	1.3 km	MPC · JPL
878477	2012 RZ_{29}	—	September 27, 2008	Mount Lemmon	Mount Lemmon Survey	·	980 m	MPC · JPL
878478	2012 RK_{31}	—	September 14, 2012	ASC-Kislovodsk	Nevski, V., A. Novichonok	·	1.6 km	MPC · JPL
878479	2012 RK_{33}	—	September 14, 2012	Catalina	CSS	critical	1.3 km	MPC · JPL
878480	2012 RX_{36}	—	September 11, 2012	Westfield	International Astronomical Search Collaboration	·	1.2 km	MPC · JPL
878481	2012 RA_{39}	—	August 13, 2012	Haleakala	Pan-STARRS 1	·	2.3 km	MPC · JPL
878482	2012 RV_{44}	—	September 14, 2012	Kitt Peak	Spacewatch	·	1.0 km	MPC · JPL
878483	2012 RV_{45}	—	September 15, 2012	Catalina	CSS	·	1.8 km	MPC · JPL
878484	2012 RU_{46}	—	March 25, 2003	Mauna Kea	Mauna Kea	MAS	520 m	MPC · JPL
878485	2012 RF_{47}	—	September 15, 2012	Kitt Peak	Spacewatch	·	840 m	MPC · JPL
878486	2012 RU_{47}	—	September 12, 2012	Siding Spring	SSS	·	750 m	MPC · JPL
878487	2012 RD_{49}	—	September 15, 2012	Kitt Peak	Spacewatch	·	1.1 km	MPC · JPL
878488	2012 RC_{50}	—	September 13, 2012	Mount Lemmon	Mount Lemmon Survey	·	390 m	MPC · JPL
878489	2012 SJ_{1}	—	August 14, 2012	Haleakala	Pan-STARRS 1	·	1.5 km	MPC · JPL
878490	2012 SH_{5}	—	September 14, 2012	Catalina	CSS	·	1.1 km	MPC · JPL
878491	2012 SL_{10}	—	October 22, 2008	Lulin	LUSS	·	1.2 km	MPC · JPL
878492	2012 SD_{15}	—	December 1, 2008	Mount Lemmon	Mount Lemmon Survey	ADE	1.3 km	MPC · JPL
878493	2012 SJ_{22}	—	September 14, 2012	Catalina	CSS	·	900 m	MPC · JPL
878494	2012 SY_{26}	—	October 25, 2008	Kitt Peak	Spacewatch	·	1.2 km	MPC · JPL
878495	2012 SV_{45}	—	September 22, 2012	Kitt Peak	Spacewatch	·	1.1 km	MPC · JPL
878496	2012 SM_{49}	—	September 23, 2012	Mount Lemmon	Mount Lemmon Survey	·	1.6 km	MPC · JPL
878497	2012 SA_{57}	—	September 16, 2012	Catalina	CSS	JUN	940 m	MPC · JPL
878498	2012 SN_{57}	—	September 24, 2012	Kitt Peak	Spacewatch	·	1.0 km	MPC · JPL
878499	2012 SE_{58}	—	April 1, 2009	Mount Lemmon	Mount Lemmon Survey	·	370 m	MPC · JPL
878500	2012 SH_{62}	—	November 19, 2008	Kitt Peak	Spacewatch	(5)	780 m	MPC · JPL

== 878501–878600 ==
back to top

Designation			Discovery			Properties		Ref
Permanent	Provisional	Named after	Date	Site	Discoverer(s)	Category	Diam.	Ref
878501	2012 ST_{63}	—	November 3, 2008	Mount Lemmon	Mount Lemmon Survey	·	660 m	MPC · JPL
878502	2012 SL_{64}	—	October 1, 2008	Mount Lemmon	Mount Lemmon Survey	EUN	990 m	MPC · JPL
878503	2012 SW_{64}	—	August 12, 2012	Kitt Peak	Spacewatch	·	990 m	MPC · JPL
878504	2012 SL_{66}	—	September 21, 2012	Mount Lemmon	Mount Lemmon Survey	·	1.0 km	MPC · JPL
878505	2012 SV_{67}	—	October 30, 2007	Mount Lemmon	Mount Lemmon Survey	·	1.3 km	MPC · JPL
878506	2012 SJ_{74}	—	September 21, 2012	Mount Lemmon	Mount Lemmon Survey	·	2.8 km	MPC · JPL
878507	2012 SD_{75}	—	December 30, 2013	Mount Lemmon	Mount Lemmon Survey	(5)	1.0 km	MPC · JPL
878508	2012 SX_{75}	—	September 16, 2012	Mount Lemmon	Mount Lemmon Survey	(1547)	1.2 km	MPC · JPL
878509	2012 SZ_{76}	—	September 16, 2012	Nogales	M. Schwartz, P. R. Holvorcem	·	2.0 km	MPC · JPL
878510	2012 SU_{79}	—	September 26, 2012	Mount Lemmon	Mount Lemmon Survey	·	1.6 km	MPC · JPL
878511	2012 SW_{87}	—	September 18, 2012	Mount Lemmon	Mount Lemmon Survey	·	930 m	MPC · JPL
878512	2012 SC_{94}	—	October 26, 2008	Mount Lemmon	Mount Lemmon Survey	(5)	780 m	MPC · JPL
878513	2012 SP_{94}	—	April 2, 2019	Haleakala	Pan-STARRS 1	L5	6.3 km	MPC · JPL
878514	2012 SM_{98}	—	September 16, 2012	Nogales	M. Schwartz, P. R. Holvorcem	·	910 m	MPC · JPL
878515	2012 SE_{100}	—	September 25, 2012	Kitt Peak	Spacewatch	EUN	750 m	MPC · JPL
878516	2012 SR_{103}	—	August 20, 2012	Črni Vrh	Mikuž, B.	·	2.1 km	MPC · JPL
878517	2012 SR_{106}	—	September 21, 2012	Mount Lemmon	Mount Lemmon Survey	critical	1.4 km	MPC · JPL
878518	2012 ST_{109}	—	September 19, 2012	Mount Lemmon	Mount Lemmon Survey	·	1.1 km	MPC · JPL
878519	2012 TJ_{1}	—	November 5, 2007	Kitt Peak	Spacewatch	·	1.2 km	MPC · JPL
878520	2012 TT_{4}	—	October 5, 2012	Haleakala	Pan-STARRS 1	L5	8.8 km	MPC · JPL
878521	2012 TC_{6}	—	September 17, 2012	Mount Lemmon	Mount Lemmon Survey	·	860 m	MPC · JPL
878522	2012 TJ_{8}	—	September 15, 2012	Kitt Peak	Spacewatch	·	1.0 km	MPC · JPL
878523	2012 TM_{8}	—	November 16, 2003	Sacramento Peak	SDSS	·	3.6 km	MPC · JPL
878524	2012 TE_{14}	—	October 5, 2012	Haleakala	Pan-STARRS 1	L5	9.0 km	MPC · JPL
878525	2012 TP_{14}	—	October 7, 2012	Kitt Peak	Spacewatch	·	1.1 km	MPC · JPL
878526	2012 TZ_{14}	—	October 7, 2012	Haleakala	Pan-STARRS 1	·	950 m	MPC · JPL
878527	2012 TB_{18}	—	October 6, 2012	Mount Lemmon	Mount Lemmon Survey	·	750 m	MPC · JPL
878528	2012 TD_{35}	—	August 20, 1995	Kitt Peak	Spacewatch	·	840 m	MPC · JPL
878529	2012 TJ_{35}	—	October 8, 2012	Haleakala	Pan-STARRS 1	L5	5.7 km	MPC · JPL
878530	2012 TG_{36}	—	September 15, 2012	ESA OGS	ESA OGS	·	2.6 km	MPC · JPL
878531	2012 TY_{37}	—	October 7, 2012	Haleakala	Pan-STARRS 1	·	990 m	MPC · JPL
878532	2012 TF_{42}	—	October 30, 2008	Kitt Peak	Spacewatch	·	980 m	MPC · JPL
878533	2012 TD_{56}	—	January 19, 2005	Kitt Peak	Spacewatch	·	900 m	MPC · JPL
878534	2012 TH_{59}	—	January 27, 2007	Mount Lemmon	Mount Lemmon Survey	·	410 m	MPC · JPL
878535	2012 TQ_{59}	—	September 23, 2008	Mount Lemmon	Mount Lemmon Survey	·	850 m	MPC · JPL
878536	2012 TD_{64}	—	September 15, 2012	Mount Lemmon	Mount Lemmon Survey	H	430 m	MPC · JPL
878537	2012 TG_{64}	—	October 8, 2012	Catalina	CSS	·	1.1 km	MPC · JPL
878538	2012 TB_{66}	—	October 8, 2012	Catalina	CSS	·	1.2 km	MPC · JPL
878539	2012 TB_{82}	—	September 22, 2012	Kitt Peak	Spacewatch	·	970 m	MPC · JPL
878540	2012 TP_{89}	—	October 7, 2012	Haleakala	Pan-STARRS 1	·	980 m	MPC · JPL
878541	2012 TA_{93}	—	November 5, 1999	Kitt Peak	Spacewatch	·	1.1 km	MPC · JPL
878542	2012 TZ_{98}	—	October 8, 2012	Kitt Peak	Spacewatch	·	870 m	MPC · JPL
878543	2012 TH_{99}	—	October 8, 2012	Kitt Peak	Spacewatch	·	1.8 km	MPC · JPL
878544	2012 TF_{100}	—	October 8, 2012	Catalina	CSS	(1547)	1.2 km	MPC · JPL
878545	2012 TS_{108}	—	October 10, 2012	Mount Lemmon	Mount Lemmon Survey	·	1.1 km	MPC · JPL
878546	2012 TR_{120}	—	October 19, 2006	Kitt Peak	Spacewatch	·	2.9 km	MPC · JPL
878547	2012 TU_{123}	—	October 6, 2012	Mount Lemmon	Mount Lemmon Survey	H	320 m	MPC · JPL
878548	2012 TJ_{124}	—	January 13, 2002	Sacramento Peak	SDSS	L5	10 km	MPC · JPL
878549	2012 TH_{130}	—	October 10, 2012	Catalina	CSS	·	1.0 km	MPC · JPL
878550	2012 TV_{130}	—	September 26, 2012	Mount Lemmon	International Astronomical Search Collaboration	·	680 m	MPC · JPL
878551	2012 TE_{132}	—	October 9, 2012	Mount Lemmon	Mount Lemmon Survey	JUN	760 m	MPC · JPL
878552	2012 TF_{134}	—	September 16, 2012	Kitt Peak	Spacewatch	·	860 m	MPC · JPL
878553	2012 TN_{136}	—	October 7, 2012	Haleakala	Pan-STARRS 1	·	1.5 km	MPC · JPL
878554	2012 TX_{137}	—	September 15, 2012	Kitt Peak	Spacewatch	(1547)	880 m	MPC · JPL
878555	2012 TT_{139}	—	October 9, 2012	Haleakala	Pan-STARRS 1	L5	5.9 km	MPC · JPL
878556	2012 TY_{148}	—	October 8, 2012	Mount Lemmon	Mount Lemmon Survey	L5	5.7 km	MPC · JPL
878557	2012 TZ_{159}	—	October 8, 2012	Mount Lemmon	Mount Lemmon Survey	·	1.2 km	MPC · JPL
878558	2012 TJ_{166}	—	October 8, 2012	Haleakala	Pan-STARRS 1	·	1.0 km	MPC · JPL
878559	2012 TG_{169}	—	November 3, 2008	Kitt Peak	Spacewatch	·	1.0 km	MPC · JPL
878560	2012 TC_{171}	—	October 9, 2012	Mount Lemmon	Mount Lemmon Survey	·	860 m	MPC · JPL
878561	2012 TO_{173}	—	September 16, 2012	Kitt Peak	Spacewatch	·	900 m	MPC · JPL
878562	2012 TS_{186}	—	October 9, 2012	Mount Lemmon	Mount Lemmon Survey	·	1.0 km	MPC · JPL
878563	2012 TY_{198}	—	October 11, 2012	Kitt Peak	Spacewatch	MAR	620 m	MPC · JPL
878564	2012 TK_{200}	—	October 11, 2012	Kitt Peak	Spacewatch	THB	2.1 km	MPC · JPL
878565	2012 TT_{202}	—	September 17, 2012	Mount Lemmon	Mount Lemmon Survey	·	1.6 km	MPC · JPL
878566	2012 TN_{208}	—	October 4, 2008	Mount Lemmon	Mount Lemmon Survey	·	950 m	MPC · JPL
878567	2012 TS_{223}	—	October 6, 2012	Mount Lemmon	Mount Lemmon Survey	·	1.0 km	MPC · JPL
878568	2012 TH_{225}	—	October 27, 2008	Kitt Peak	Spacewatch	·	950 m	MPC · JPL
878569	2012 TB_{226}	—	October 8, 2012	Mount Lemmon	Mount Lemmon Survey	THM	1.4 km	MPC · JPL
878570	2012 TW_{229}	—	November 6, 2007	Kitt Peak	Spacewatch	·	1.8 km	MPC · JPL
878571	2012 TC_{236}	—	October 7, 2012	Haleakala	Pan-STARRS 1	ADE	1.1 km	MPC · JPL
878572	2012 TD_{239}	—	October 8, 2012	Mount Lemmon	Mount Lemmon Survey	EUN	630 m	MPC · JPL
878573	2012 TW_{245}	—	October 13, 2012	Kitt Peak	Spacewatch	·	1.0 km	MPC · JPL
878574	2012 TN_{251}	—	October 11, 2012	Haleakala	Pan-STARRS 1	·	950 m	MPC · JPL
878575	2012 TZ_{253}	—	October 11, 2012	Piszkés-tető	K. Sárneczky, S. Kürti	KON	1.8 km	MPC · JPL
878576	2012 TN_{254}	—	October 11, 2012	Piszkéstető	K. Sárneczky	·	1.0 km	MPC · JPL
878577	2012 TM_{255}	—	September 21, 2012	Mount Lemmon	Mount Lemmon Survey	critical	2.0 km	MPC · JPL
878578	2012 TT_{255}	—	October 15, 2012	Kitt Peak	Spacewatch	·	1.0 km	MPC · JPL
878579	2012 TB_{257}	—	October 11, 2004	Kitt Peak	Spacewatch	T_{j} (2.98) · 3:2	2.9 km	MPC · JPL
878580	2012 TZ_{267}	—	October 9, 2012	Mount Lemmon	Mount Lemmon Survey	·	910 m	MPC · JPL
878581	2012 TW_{277}	—	September 15, 2012	Mount Lemmon	Mount Lemmon Survey	·	1.2 km	MPC · JPL
878582	2012 TQ_{279}	—	September 16, 2012	Kitt Peak	Spacewatch	·	670 m	MPC · JPL
878583	2012 TV_{282}	—	October 10, 2012	Kitt Peak	Spacewatch	·	1.2 km	MPC · JPL
878584	2012 TB_{288}	—	February 21, 1988	La Silla	E. W. Elst	ADE	3.0 km	MPC · JPL
878585	2012 TD_{289}	—	October 6, 2012	Piszkés-tető	K. Sárneczky, S. Kürti	·	2.1 km	MPC · JPL
878586	2012 TO_{292}	—	October 14, 2012	Kitt Peak	Spacewatch	·	1.0 km	MPC · JPL
878587	2012 TX_{292}	—	October 14, 2012	Kitt Peak	Spacewatch	·	2.3 km	MPC · JPL
878588	2012 TL_{295}	—	October 14, 2012	Mount Lemmon	Mount Lemmon Survey	·	1.1 km	MPC · JPL
878589	2012 TS_{309}	—	November 21, 2005	Kitt Peak	Spacewatch	NYS	750 m	MPC · JPL
878590	2012 TY_{311}	—	October 14, 2012	Kitt Peak	Spacewatch	·	1.3 km	MPC · JPL
878591	2012 TL_{314}	—	October 15, 2012	Haleakala	Pan-STARRS 1	(5)	890 m	MPC · JPL
878592	2012 TO_{314}	—	October 15, 2012	Kitt Peak	Spacewatch	·	770 m	MPC · JPL
878593	2012 TU_{316}	—	October 14, 2012	Nogales	M. Schwartz, P. R. Holvorcem	·	880 m	MPC · JPL
878594	2012 TT_{319}	—	October 9, 2012	Haleakala	Pan-STARRS 1	H	310 m	MPC · JPL
878595	2012 TK_{322}	—	September 17, 2012	Kislovodsk	ISON-Kislovodsk Observatory	·	1.3 km	MPC · JPL
878596	2012 TK_{323}	—	October 10, 2012	Mount Lemmon	Mount Lemmon Survey	·	940 m	MPC · JPL
878597	2012 TD_{328}	—	October 22, 2012	Mount Lemmon	Mount Lemmon Survey	·	1.8 km	MPC · JPL
878598	2012 TR_{336}	—	October 8, 2012	Haleakala	Pan-STARRS 1	·	1.6 km	MPC · JPL
878599	2012 TO_{337}	—	October 10, 2012	Mount Lemmon	Mount Lemmon Survey	·	860 m	MPC · JPL
878600	2012 TY_{342}	—	October 10, 2012	Mount Lemmon	Mount Lemmon Survey	·	880 m	MPC · JPL

== 878601–878700 ==
back to top

Designation			Discovery			Properties		Ref
Permanent	Provisional	Named after	Date	Site	Discoverer(s)	Category	Diam.	Ref
878601	2012 TO_{344}	—	October 11, 2012	Haleakala	Pan-STARRS 1	(116763)	1.2 km	MPC · JPL
878602	2012 TG_{348}	—	October 7, 2012	Haleakala	Pan-STARRS 1	(5)	950 m	MPC · JPL
878603	2012 TM_{348}	—	October 8, 2012	Mount Lemmon	Mount Lemmon Survey	·	1.5 km	MPC · JPL
878604	2012 TB_{349}	—	October 8, 2012	Haleakala	Pan-STARRS 1	·	840 m	MPC · JPL
878605	2012 TB_{350}	—	October 11, 2012	Piszkéstető	K. Sárneczky	·	1.9 km	MPC · JPL
878606	2012 TC_{351}	—	October 4, 2012	Mount Lemmon	Mount Lemmon Survey	·	780 m	MPC · JPL
878607	2012 TV_{351}	—	October 9, 2012	Haleakala	Pan-STARRS 1	L5	7.1 km	MPC · JPL
878608	2012 TO_{359}	—	October 11, 2012	Haleakala	Pan-STARRS 1	·	650 m	MPC · JPL
878609	2012 TC_{360}	—	October 9, 2012	Mount Lemmon	Mount Lemmon Survey	·	1.1 km	MPC · JPL
878610	2012 TA_{362}	—	October 9, 2012	Kitt Peak	Spacewatch	·	810 m	MPC · JPL
878611	2012 TX_{371}	—	October 10, 2012	Mount Lemmon	Mount Lemmon Survey	L5	5.1 km	MPC · JPL
878612	2012 TR_{381}	—	October 8, 2012	Haleakala	Pan-STARRS 1	·	1.1 km	MPC · JPL
878613	2012 TS_{383}	—	October 10, 2012	Haleakala	Pan-STARRS 1	HNS	780 m	MPC · JPL
878614	2012 TK_{384}	—	October 11, 2012	Haleakala	Pan-STARRS 1	·	1.1 km	MPC · JPL
878615	2012 TD_{385}	—	October 8, 2012	Mount Lemmon	Mount Lemmon Survey	·	1.1 km	MPC · JPL
878616	2012 TF_{385}	—	October 7, 2012	Haleakala	Pan-STARRS 1	·	1.0 km	MPC · JPL
878617	2012 TL_{386}	—	October 9, 2012	Haleakala	Pan-STARRS 1	·	780 m	MPC · JPL
878618	2012 UH_{2}	—	September 15, 2012	Kitt Peak	Spacewatch	·	1.3 km	MPC · JPL
878619	2012 UY_{8}	—	October 16, 2012	Mount Lemmon	Mount Lemmon Survey	·	900 m	MPC · JPL
878620	2012 UE_{18}	—	November 20, 2008	Kitt Peak	Spacewatch	·	1.4 km	MPC · JPL
878621	2012 UV_{20}	—	October 16, 2012	Mount Lemmon	Mount Lemmon Survey	·	1.2 km	MPC · JPL
878622	2012 UO_{22}	—	October 10, 2012	Catalina	CSS	·	1.1 km	MPC · JPL
878623	2012 UM_{29}	—	October 6, 2012	Haleakala	Pan-STARRS 1	·	1.1 km	MPC · JPL
878624	2012 UX_{33}	—	September 14, 2012	Mount Lemmon	Mount Lemmon Survey	·	880 m	MPC · JPL
878625	2012 UR_{35}	—	September 18, 2012	Mount Lemmon	Mount Lemmon Survey	·	1.1 km	MPC · JPL
878626	2012 UE_{39}	—	October 8, 2012	Mount Lemmon	Mount Lemmon Survey	·	1.4 km	MPC · JPL
878627	2012 UO_{41}	—	October 17, 2012	Haleakala	Pan-STARRS 1	·	1.9 km	MPC · JPL
878628	2012 UX_{42}	—	September 19, 2012	Mount Lemmon	Mount Lemmon Survey	EUN	730 m	MPC · JPL
878629	2012 UB_{54}	—	October 17, 2012	Kitt Peak	Spacewatch	·	2.1 km	MPC · JPL
878630	2012 UL_{59}	—	October 19, 2012	Haleakala	Pan-STARRS 1	·	1.1 km	MPC · JPL
878631	2012 UH_{65}	—	September 22, 2008	Mount Lemmon	Mount Lemmon Survey	·	730 m	MPC · JPL
878632	2012 US_{67}	—	October 18, 2012	Haleakala	Pan-STARRS 1	·	1.4 km	MPC · JPL
878633	2012 UV_{73}	—	October 17, 2012	Haleakala	Pan-STARRS 1	·	1.1 km	MPC · JPL
878634	2012 UM_{86}	—	October 6, 2012	Kitt Peak	Spacewatch	·	1.7 km	MPC · JPL
878635	2012 UT_{87}	—	October 15, 2012	Mount Lemmon	Mount Lemmon Survey	·	990 m	MPC · JPL
878636	2012 UC_{90}	—	October 21, 2012	Haleakala	Pan-STARRS 1	·	900 m	MPC · JPL
878637	2012 UQ_{100}	—	October 18, 2012	Haleakala	Pan-STARRS 1	(5)	860 m	MPC · JPL
878638	2012 UM_{104}	—	October 14, 2012	Catalina	CSS	·	990 m	MPC · JPL
878639	2012 UH_{109}	—	October 20, 2012	Kitt Peak	Spacewatch	·	1.3 km	MPC · JPL
878640	2012 UC_{113}	—	September 18, 2012	Kitt Peak	Spacewatch	·	910 m	MPC · JPL
878641	2012 UX_{119}	—	October 8, 2012	Kitt Peak	Spacewatch	·	520 m	MPC · JPL
878642	2012 UK_{125}	—	October 22, 2012	Haleakala	Pan-STARRS 1	·	810 m	MPC · JPL
878643	2012 UE_{126}	—	October 22, 2012	Haleakala	Pan-STARRS 1	(5)	940 m	MPC · JPL
878644	2012 UZ_{126}	—	October 22, 2012	Haleakala	Pan-STARRS 1	·	790 m	MPC · JPL
878645	2012 UB_{128}	—	September 21, 2012	Mount Lemmon	Mount Lemmon Survey	EUN	740 m	MPC · JPL
878646	2012 UU_{128}	—	October 18, 2012	Mount Lemmon	Mount Lemmon Survey	·	1.1 km	MPC · JPL
878647	2012 UH_{132}	—	October 11, 2012	Catalina	CSS	·	1.3 km	MPC · JPL
878648	2012 UC_{138}	—	October 8, 2012	Mount Lemmon	Mount Lemmon Survey	·	980 m	MPC · JPL
878649	2012 UJ_{139}	—	October 10, 2012	Mount Lemmon	Mount Lemmon Survey	·	860 m	MPC · JPL
878650	2012 UM_{154}	—	October 16, 2012	Catalina	CSS	·	980 m	MPC · JPL
878651	2012 UM_{162}	—	October 22, 2012	Mount Lemmon	Mount Lemmon Survey	·	1.0 km	MPC · JPL
878652	2012 US_{164}	—	October 10, 2012	Haleakala	Pan-STARRS 1	·	2.2 km	MPC · JPL
878653	2012 UR_{167}	—	October 19, 2012	Mount Lemmon	Mount Lemmon Survey	·	1.1 km	MPC · JPL
878654	2012 UM_{170}	—	October 19, 2012	Haleakala	Pan-STARRS 1	MAR	620 m	MPC · JPL
878655	2012 UW_{172}	—	October 19, 2012	Haleakala	Pan-STARRS 1	(40134)	1.2 km	MPC · JPL
878656	2012 UK_{184}	—	October 16, 2012	Mount Lemmon	Mount Lemmon Survey	·	1.6 km	MPC · JPL
878657	2012 UN_{188}	—	October 21, 2012	Haleakala	Pan-STARRS 1	·	1.4 km	MPC · JPL
878658	2012 UT_{188}	—	October 20, 2012	Kitt Peak	Spacewatch	·	960 m	MPC · JPL
878659	2012 UZ_{189}	—	October 19, 2012	Siding Spring	SSS	·	1.1 km	MPC · JPL
878660	2012 UC_{190}	—	February 26, 2014	Haleakala	Pan-STARRS 1	EUN	840 m	MPC · JPL
878661	2012 UD_{191}	—	October 16, 2012	Kitt Peak	Spacewatch	(5)	780 m	MPC · JPL
878662	2012 UF_{191}	—	October 18, 2012	Mount Lemmon	Mount Lemmon Survey	·	910 m	MPC · JPL
878663	2012 UK_{191}	—	October 22, 2012	Haleakala	Pan-STARRS 1	·	1.4 km	MPC · JPL
878664	2012 UC_{193}	—	October 19, 2012	Mount Lemmon	Mount Lemmon Survey	·	930 m	MPC · JPL
878665	2012 UE_{193}	—	October 17, 2012	Mount Lemmon	Mount Lemmon Survey	EOS	1.3 km	MPC · JPL
878666	2012 UP_{194}	—	October 18, 2012	Haleakala	Pan-STARRS 1	·	990 m	MPC · JPL
878667	2012 UV_{194}	—	October 19, 2012	Mount Lemmon	Mount Lemmon Survey	·	960 m	MPC · JPL
878668	2012 UH_{196}	—	October 17, 2012	Mount Lemmon	Mount Lemmon Survey	·	780 m	MPC · JPL
878669	2012 UA_{199}	—	October 17, 2012	Mount Lemmon	Mount Lemmon Survey	H	320 m	MPC · JPL
878670	2012 UW_{200}	—	October 18, 2012	Haleakala	Pan-STARRS 1	·	870 m	MPC · JPL
878671	2012 UB_{203}	—	October 22, 2012	Haleakala	Pan-STARRS 1	MAS	450 m	MPC · JPL
878672	2012 UW_{211}	—	October 18, 2012	Haleakala	Pan-STARRS 1	·	970 m	MPC · JPL
878673	2012 UB_{212}	—	October 22, 2012	Kitt Peak	Spacewatch	·	880 m	MPC · JPL
878674	2012 UB_{214}	—	October 23, 2012	Kitt Peak	Spacewatch	T_{j} (2.99) · 3:2	2.6 km	MPC · JPL
878675	2012 UK_{217}	—	October 18, 2012	Haleakala	Pan-STARRS 1	·	950 m	MPC · JPL
878676	2012 US_{218}	—	October 18, 2012	Haleakala	Pan-STARRS 1	critical	690 m	MPC · JPL
878677	2012 UO_{219}	—	October 18, 2012	Haleakala	Pan-STARRS 1	·	930 m	MPC · JPL
878678	2012 UE_{224}	—	October 26, 2012	Mount Lemmon	Mount Lemmon Survey	·	920 m	MPC · JPL
878679	2012 UY_{231}	—	October 22, 2012	Haleakala	Pan-STARRS 1	·	1.5 km	MPC · JPL
878680	2012 UB_{232}	—	October 20, 2012	Haleakala	Pan-STARRS 1	·	1.0 km	MPC · JPL
878681	2012 UX_{233}	—	October 18, 2012	Mount Lemmon	Mount Lemmon Survey	·	910 m	MPC · JPL
878682	2012 UZ_{240}	—	October 19, 2012	Mount Lemmon	Mount Lemmon Survey	·	1.2 km	MPC · JPL
878683	2012 UB_{243}	—	October 22, 2012	Haleakala	Pan-STARRS 1	·	880 m	MPC · JPL
878684	2012 US_{243}	—	October 17, 2012	Haleakala	Pan-STARRS 1	·	790 m	MPC · JPL
878685	2012 UZ_{244}	—	October 23, 2012	Mount Lemmon	Mount Lemmon Survey	·	790 m	MPC · JPL
878686	2012 UE_{254}	—	October 22, 2012	Haleakala	Pan-STARRS 1	·	2.3 km	MPC · JPL
878687	2012 UM_{254}	—	May 25, 2019	Haleakala	Pan-STARRS 1	JUN	560 m	MPC · JPL
878688	2012 UN_{254}	—	October 18, 2012	Haleakala	Pan-STARRS 1	critical	390 m	MPC · JPL
878689	2012 UJ_{269}	—	October 27, 2012	Mount Lemmon	Mount Lemmon Survey	·	1.1 km	MPC · JPL
878690	2012 VE_{1}	—	November 2, 2012	Haleakala	Pan-STARRS 1	EUN	580 m	MPC · JPL
878691	2012 VH_{16}	—	November 5, 2012	Kitt Peak	Spacewatch	·	1.2 km	MPC · JPL
878692	2012 VZ_{25}	—	November 5, 2012	Kitt Peak	Spacewatch	AMO	670 m	MPC · JPL
878693	2012 VB_{35}	—	December 4, 2005	Kitt Peak	Spacewatch	NYS	640 m	MPC · JPL
878694	2012 VQ_{36}	—	October 10, 2012	Kitt Peak	Spacewatch	(1547)	920 m	MPC · JPL
878695	2012 VU_{60}	—	October 16, 2012	Kitt Peak	Spacewatch	·	940 m	MPC · JPL
878696	2012 VM_{61}	—	October 21, 2012	Kitt Peak	Spacewatch	·	830 m	MPC · JPL
878697	2012 VR_{62}	—	November 7, 2012	Haleakala	Pan-STARRS 1	·	1.1 km	MPC · JPL
878698	2012 VR_{67}	—	October 18, 2012	Haleakala	Pan-STARRS 1	·	1.0 km	MPC · JPL
878699	2012 VX_{68}	—	November 7, 2012	Haleakala	Pan-STARRS 1	·	940 m	MPC · JPL
878700	2012 VT_{71}	—	October 22, 2012	Kitt Peak	Spacewatch	·	840 m	MPC · JPL

== 878701–878800 ==
back to top

Designation			Discovery			Properties		Ref
Permanent	Provisional	Named after	Date	Site	Discoverer(s)	Category	Diam.	Ref
878701	2012 VA_{72}	—	December 29, 2008	Mount Lemmon	Mount Lemmon Survey	MIS	1.8 km	MPC · JPL
878702	2012 VH_{75}	—	October 13, 2012	Kitt Peak	Spacewatch	·	960 m	MPC · JPL
878703	2012 VM_{75}	—	October 18, 2012	Haleakala	Pan-STARRS 1	·	1.0 km	MPC · JPL
878704	2012 VB_{77}	—	November 1, 2006	Catalina	CSS	T_{j} (2.96)	3.3 km	MPC · JPL
878705	2012 VE_{79}	—	October 11, 2012	Catalina	CSS	·	1.3 km	MPC · JPL
878706	2012 VF_{82}	—	November 13, 2012	Catalina	CSS	AMO	250 m	MPC · JPL
878707	2012 VM_{84}	—	October 23, 2012	Mount Lemmon	Mount Lemmon Survey	·	1.0 km	MPC · JPL
878708	2012 VY_{86}	—	October 22, 2012	Haleakala	Pan-STARRS 1	·	630 m	MPC · JPL
878709	2012 VX_{93}	—	November 12, 2012	Mount Lemmon	Mount Lemmon Survey	·	1.1 km	MPC · JPL
878710	2012 VF_{99}	—	March 24, 2001	Haleakala	NEAT	EUN	3.0 km	MPC · JPL
878711	2012 VW_{108}	—	November 13, 2012	Kitt Peak	Spacewatch	·	1.2 km	MPC · JPL
878712	2012 VW_{115}	—	November 7, 2012	Mount Lemmon	Mount Lemmon Survey	H	430 m	MPC · JPL
878713	2012 VM_{118}	—	November 12, 2012	Mount Lemmon	Mount Lemmon Survey	·	910 m	MPC · JPL
878714	2012 VQ_{118}	—	November 7, 2012	Mount Lemmon	Mount Lemmon Survey	·	680 m	MPC · JPL
878715	2012 VN_{121}	—	November 4, 2012	Haleakala	Pan-STARRS 1	H	370 m	MPC · JPL
878716	2012 VM_{125}	—	November 7, 2012	Mount Lemmon	Mount Lemmon Survey	·	1.2 km	MPC · JPL
878717	2012 VN_{125}	—	November 4, 2012	Catalina	CSS	·	1.1 km	MPC · JPL
878718	2012 VO_{128}	—	November 12, 2012	Bergisch Gladbach	W. Bickel	·	1.2 km	MPC · JPL
878719	2012 VM_{130}	—	November 7, 2012	Mount Lemmon	Mount Lemmon Survey	·	1.7 km	MPC · JPL
878720	2012 VE_{136}	—	November 12, 2012	Haleakala	Pan-STARRS 1	HNS	830 m	MPC · JPL
878721	2012 VE_{140}	—	November 12, 2012	Mount Lemmon	Mount Lemmon Survey	JUN	740 m	MPC · JPL
878722	2012 WG_{7}	—	November 9, 2012	Westfield	International Astronomical Search Collaboration	·	910 m	MPC · JPL
878723	2012 WJ_{8}	—	October 22, 2012	Haleakala	Pan-STARRS 1	(5)	920 m	MPC · JPL
878724	2012 WW_{8}	—	September 20, 2003	Kitt Peak	Spacewatch	·	920 m	MPC · JPL
878725	2012 WG_{10}	—	November 20, 2012	Mount Lemmon	Mount Lemmon Survey	·	3.5 km	MPC · JPL
878726	2012 WQ_{30}	—	November 17, 2012	Mount Lemmon	Mount Lemmon Survey	·	1.0 km	MPC · JPL
878727	2012 WL_{33}	—	November 7, 2012	Kitt Peak	Spacewatch	NEM	1.6 km	MPC · JPL
878728	2012 WG_{35}	—	September 25, 2012	Mount Lemmon	Mount Lemmon Survey	·	1.0 km	MPC · JPL
878729	2012 WO_{40}	—	November 26, 2012	Mount Lemmon	Mount Lemmon Survey	·	750 m	MPC · JPL
878730	2012 WT_{40}	—	November 25, 2012	Haleakala	Pan-STARRS 1	·	850 m	MPC · JPL
878731	2012 WF_{43}	—	November 23, 2012	Kitt Peak	Spacewatch	EUN	820 m	MPC · JPL
878732	2012 XT_{7}	—	November 6, 2012	Kitt Peak	Spacewatch	(1547)	1.3 km	MPC · JPL
878733	2012 XV_{14}	—	December 5, 2012	Mount Lemmon	Mount Lemmon Survey	·	830 m	MPC · JPL
878734	2012 XZ_{14}	—	November 7, 2012	Mount Lemmon	Mount Lemmon Survey	·	1.1 km	MPC · JPL
878735	2012 XS_{15}	—	December 5, 2012	Mount Lemmon	Mount Lemmon Survey	·	1.7 km	MPC · JPL
878736	2012 XT_{17}	—	December 2, 2012	Mount Lemmon	Mount Lemmon Survey	·	1.1 km	MPC · JPL
878737	2012 XC_{19}	—	December 2, 2012	Mount Lemmon	Mount Lemmon Survey	·	720 m	MPC · JPL
878738	2012 XW_{29}	—	November 7, 2012	Kitt Peak	Spacewatch	·	1.0 km	MPC · JPL
878739	2012 XX_{43}	—	November 26, 2012	Mount Lemmon	Mount Lemmon Survey	·	1.2 km	MPC · JPL
878740	2012 XJ_{46}	—	December 4, 2012	Mount Lemmon	Mount Lemmon Survey	H	390 m	MPC · JPL
878741	2012 XP_{47}	—	December 4, 2012	Kitt Peak	Spacewatch	·	1.2 km	MPC · JPL
878742	2012 XV_{47}	—	December 4, 2012	Kitt Peak	Spacewatch	·	740 m	MPC · JPL
878743	2012 XT_{48}	—	December 5, 2012	Mount Lemmon	Mount Lemmon Survey	·	460 m	MPC · JPL
878744	2012 XY_{49}	—	November 23, 2012	Kitt Peak	Spacewatch	·	940 m	MPC · JPL
878745	2012 XC_{50}	—	November 24, 2012	Kitt Peak	Spacewatch	(5)	960 m	MPC · JPL
878746	2012 XX_{51}	—	December 6, 2012	Mount Lemmon	Mount Lemmon Survey	·	1.0 km	MPC · JPL
878747	2012 XV_{53}	—	December 7, 2012	Mount Lemmon	Mount Lemmon Survey	·	1.1 km	MPC · JPL
878748	2012 XH_{54}	—	November 13, 2012	Kitt Peak	Spacewatch	·	940 m	MPC · JPL
878749	2012 XS_{61}	—	December 4, 2012	Mount Lemmon	Mount Lemmon Survey	EUN	830 m	MPC · JPL
878750	2012 XR_{64}	—	October 9, 2012	Mount Lemmon	Mount Lemmon Survey	·	1.1 km	MPC · JPL
878751	2012 XT_{65}	—	December 4, 2012	Mount Lemmon	Mount Lemmon Survey	·	920 m	MPC · JPL
878752	2012 XJ_{76}	—	December 6, 2012	Mount Lemmon	Mount Lemmon Survey	·	890 m	MPC · JPL
878753	2012 XN_{77}	—	November 23, 2012	Kitt Peak	Spacewatch	·	1.2 km	MPC · JPL
878754	2012 XX_{78}	—	December 6, 2012	Mount Lemmon	Mount Lemmon Survey	·	780 m	MPC · JPL
878755	2012 XM_{84}	—	November 20, 2012	Mount Lemmon	Mount Lemmon Survey	·	1.5 km	MPC · JPL
878756	2012 XS_{92}	—	December 8, 2012	Mount Lemmon	Mount Lemmon Survey	·	840 m	MPC · JPL
878757	2012 XO_{93}	—	December 8, 2012	Mount Lemmon	Mount Lemmon Survey	·	520 m	MPC · JPL
878758	2012 XS_{93}	—	December 8, 2012	Kitt Peak	Spacewatch	APO	370 m	MPC · JPL
878759	2012 XY_{94}	—	November 23, 2012	Nogales	M. Schwartz, P. R. Holvorcem	·	1.3 km	MPC · JPL
878760	2012 XL_{99}	—	December 5, 2012	Mount Lemmon	Mount Lemmon Survey	·	2.0 km	MPC · JPL
878761	2012 XO_{99}	—	December 5, 2012	Mount Lemmon	Mount Lemmon Survey	·	3.1 km	MPC · JPL
878762	2012 XJ_{105}	—	December 7, 2012	Mount Lemmon	Mount Lemmon Survey	(5)	790 m	MPC · JPL
878763	2012 XY_{105}	—	September 23, 2012	Mount Lemmon	Mount Lemmon Survey	T_{j} (2.98) · critical	2.1 km	MPC · JPL
878764	2012 XL_{109}	—	December 8, 2012	Mount Lemmon	Mount Lemmon Survey	EUN	780 m	MPC · JPL
878765	2012 XV_{120}	—	November 12, 2012	Mount Lemmon	Mount Lemmon Survey	·	1.3 km	MPC · JPL
878766	2012 XT_{132}	—	November 22, 2012	Kitt Peak	Spacewatch	ADE	1.1 km	MPC · JPL
878767	2012 XK_{163}	—	December 11, 2012	Mount Lemmon	Mount Lemmon Survey	·	1.1 km	MPC · JPL
878768	2012 XN_{163}	—	December 12, 2012	Mount Lemmon	Mount Lemmon Survey	JUN	760 m	MPC · JPL
878769	2012 XD_{165}	—	December 2, 2012	Mount Lemmon	Mount Lemmon Survey	MAR	710 m	MPC · JPL
878770	2012 XN_{166}	—	December 12, 2012	Mount Lemmon	Mount Lemmon Survey	·	1.3 km	MPC · JPL
878771	2012 XA_{168}	—	December 2, 2012	Mount Lemmon	Mount Lemmon Survey	·	960 m	MPC · JPL
878772	2012 XY_{168}	—	December 9, 2012	Haleakala	Pan-STARRS 1	·	1.5 km	MPC · JPL
878773	2012 XS_{169}	—	December 13, 2012	Mount Lemmon	Mount Lemmon Survey	·	1.3 km	MPC · JPL
878774	2012 XJ_{171}	—	December 10, 2012	Nogales	M. Schwartz, P. R. Holvorcem	·	2.5 km	MPC · JPL
878775	2012 XW_{171}	—	December 3, 2012	Mount Lemmon	Mount Lemmon Survey	·	1.0 km	MPC · JPL
878776	2012 XD_{178}	—	December 3, 2012	Mount Lemmon	Mount Lemmon Survey	·	750 m	MPC · JPL
878777	2012 XD_{180}	—	December 12, 2012	Mount Lemmon	Mount Lemmon Survey	·	670 m	MPC · JPL
878778	2012 YA_{4}	—	December 21, 2012	Haleakala	Pan-STARRS 1	H	330 m	MPC · JPL
878779	2012 YO_{4}	—	November 12, 2012	Mount Lemmon	Mount Lemmon Survey	·	850 m	MPC · JPL
878780	2012 YN_{5}	—	June 9, 2011	Mount Lemmon	Mount Lemmon Survey	H	370 m	MPC · JPL
878781	2012 YK_{8}	—	December 24, 2012	Haleakala	Pan-STARRS 1	·	1.3 km	MPC · JPL
878782	2012 YZ_{13}	—	December 22, 2012	Haleakala	Pan-STARRS 1	·	1.1 km	MPC · JPL
878783	2012 YL_{14}	—	December 23, 2012	Haleakala	Pan-STARRS 1	·	1.2 km	MPC · JPL
878784	2012 YM_{14}	—	December 22, 2012	Haleakala	Pan-STARRS 1	·	1.1 km	MPC · JPL
878785	2012 YN_{15}	—	December 23, 2012	Haleakala	Pan-STARRS 1	·	1.0 km	MPC · JPL
878786	2012 YP_{18}	—	December 23, 2012	Haleakala	Pan-STARRS 1	·	1.4 km	MPC · JPL
878787	2012 YO_{20}	—	December 22, 2012	Haleakala	Pan-STARRS 1	MAR	700 m	MPC · JPL
878788	2012 YJ_{28}	—	December 23, 2012	Haleakala	Pan-STARRS 1	L4	5.3 km	MPC · JPL
878789	2013 AO_{1}	—	December 8, 2012	Mount Lemmon	Mount Lemmon Survey	·	930 m	MPC · JPL
878790	2013 AD_{2}	—	January 3, 2013	Mount Lemmon	Mount Lemmon Survey	·	1.4 km	MPC · JPL
878791	2013 AQ_{2}	—	December 8, 2012	Kitt Peak	Spacewatch	H	460 m	MPC · JPL
878792	2013 AL_{14}	—	November 27, 2012	Mount Lemmon	Mount Lemmon Survey	BAR	1.1 km	MPC · JPL
878793	2013 AN_{17}	—	January 12, 2000	Kitt Peak	Spacewatch	·	1.3 km	MPC · JPL
878794	2013 AJ_{18}	—	January 5, 2013	Mount Lemmon	Mount Lemmon Survey	·	970 m	MPC · JPL
878795	2013 AJ_{22}	—	February 12, 2004	Kitt Peak	Spacewatch	·	1.3 km	MPC · JPL
878796	2013 AJ_{27}	—	October 20, 2012	Mount Lemmon	Mount Lemmon Survey	·	1.6 km	MPC · JPL
878797	2013 AL_{31}	—	October 20, 2012	Mount Lemmon	Mount Lemmon Survey	·	1.0 km	MPC · JPL
878798	2013 AJ_{33}	—	January 4, 2013	Kitt Peak	Spacewatch	·	970 m	MPC · JPL
878799	2013 AV_{34}	—	December 8, 2012	Kitt Peak	Spacewatch	·	1.2 km	MPC · JPL
878800	2013 AE_{40}	—	January 5, 2013	Kitt Peak	Spacewatch	·	800 m	MPC · JPL

== 878801–878900 ==
back to top

Designation			Discovery			Properties		Ref
Permanent	Provisional	Named after	Date	Site	Discoverer(s)	Category	Diam.	Ref
878801	2013 AB_{45}	—	January 5, 2013	Kitt Peak	Spacewatch	·	1.0 km	MPC · JPL
878802	2013 AG_{46}	—	November 5, 2005	Kitt Peak	Spacewatch	·	460 m	MPC · JPL
878803	2013 AQ_{51}	—	January 5, 2013	Mount Lemmon SkyCe	Kostin, A., T. Vorobjov	ADE	1.1 km	MPC · JPL
878804	2013 AG_{55}	—	January 6, 2013	Kitt Peak	Spacewatch	·	1.0 km	MPC · JPL
878805	2013 AJ_{59}	—	January 6, 2013	Kitt Peak	Spacewatch	·	960 m	MPC · JPL
878806	2013 AD_{60}	—	January 8, 2013	Haleakala	Pan-STARRS 1	·	820 m	MPC · JPL
878807	2013 AW_{61}	—	December 13, 2012	Kitt Peak	Spacewatch	·	1.8 km	MPC · JPL
878808	2013 AN_{63}	—	January 1, 2013	Haleakala	Pan-STARRS 1	·	990 m	MPC · JPL
878809	2013 AD_{64}	—	November 21, 2008	Mount Lemmon	Mount Lemmon Survey	PHO	740 m	MPC · JPL
878810	2013 AC_{69}	—	January 2, 2013	Mount Lemmon	Mount Lemmon Survey	·	1.1 km	MPC · JPL
878811	2013 AE_{76}	—	December 22, 2012	Haleakala	Pan-STARRS 1	·	980 m	MPC · JPL
878812	2013 AM_{78}	—	January 10, 2013	Haleakala	Pan-STARRS 1	VER	2.1 km	MPC · JPL
878813	2013 AB_{81}	—	January 12, 2013	Mount Lemmon	Mount Lemmon Survey	EUN	850 m	MPC · JPL
878814	2013 AJ_{85}	—	January 13, 2013	Mount Lemmon	Mount Lemmon Survey	EOS	1.3 km	MPC · JPL
878815	2013 AZ_{88}	—	January 3, 2013	Haleakala	Pan-STARRS 1	PHO	830 m	MPC · JPL
878816	2013 AJ_{105}	—	January 10, 2013	Haleakala	Pan-STARRS 1	·	1.3 km	MPC · JPL
878817	2013 AP_{110}	—	September 16, 2004	Socorro	LINEAR	·	1.1 km	MPC · JPL
878818	2013 AQ_{116}	—	January 4, 2013	Kitt Peak	Spacewatch	·	1.0 km	MPC · JPL
878819	2013 AB_{117}	—	January 14, 2013	Mount Lemmon	Mount Lemmon Survey	·	1.3 km	MPC · JPL
878820	2013 AG_{124}	—	November 7, 2007	Kitt Peak	Spacewatch	·	1.4 km	MPC · JPL
878821	2013 AN_{126}	—	December 8, 2012	Mount Lemmon	Mount Lemmon Survey	·	930 m	MPC · JPL
878822	2013 AD_{140}	—	January 4, 2013	Cerro Tololo	D. E. Trilling, R. L. Allen	H	470 m	MPC · JPL
878823	2013 AJ_{142}	—	October 16, 2003	Kitt Peak	Spacewatch	(1547)	770 m	MPC · JPL
878824	2013 AK_{142}	—	January 4, 2013	Cerro Tololo	D. E. Trilling, R. L. Allen	(1547)	780 m	MPC · JPL
878825	2013 AZ_{145}	—	January 4, 2013	Cerro Tololo	D. E. Trilling, R. L. Allen	·	1.2 km	MPC · JPL
878826	2013 AJ_{147}	—	January 9, 2013	Nogales	M. Schwartz, P. R. Holvorcem	·	1.4 km	MPC · JPL
878827	2013 AM_{154}	—	January 4, 2013	Cerro Tololo	D. E. Trilling, R. L. Allen	·	1.5 km	MPC · JPL
878828	2013 AY_{155}	—	January 4, 2013	Cerro Tololo	D. E. Trilling, R. L. Allen	·	1.0 km	MPC · JPL
878829	2013 AF_{159}	—	January 4, 2013	Cerro Tololo	D. E. Trilling, R. L. Allen	EUN	760 m	MPC · JPL
878830	2013 AP_{159}	—	January 20, 2013	Mount Lemmon	Mount Lemmon Survey	·	1.4 km	MPC · JPL
878831	2013 AL_{162}	—	January 4, 2013	Cerro Tololo	D. E. Trilling, R. L. Allen	VER	1.4 km	MPC · JPL
878832	2013 AQ_{164}	—	January 4, 2013	Cerro Tololo	D. E. Trilling, R. L. Allen	·	850 m	MPC · JPL
878833	2013 AB_{165}	—	February 19, 2009	Kitt Peak	Spacewatch	ADE	970 m	MPC · JPL
878834	2013 AM_{169}	—	September 2, 2011	Haleakala	Pan-STARRS 1	·	1.2 km	MPC · JPL
878835	2013 AM_{170}	—	January 4, 2013	Cerro Tololo	D. E. Trilling, R. L. Allen	MAR	650 m	MPC · JPL
878836	2013 AM_{182}	—	November 2, 2007	Kitt Peak	Spacewatch	·	1.2 km	MPC · JPL
878837	2013 AU_{184}	—	February 27, 2009	Kitt Peak	Spacewatch	MIS	1.7 km	MPC · JPL
878838	2013 AW_{190}	—	January 10, 2013	Haleakala	Pan-STARRS 1	·	2.0 km	MPC · JPL
878839	2013 AE_{192}	—	January 10, 2013	Haleakala	Pan-STARRS 1	·	1 km	MPC · JPL
878840	2013 AT_{194}	—	January 9, 2013	Kitt Peak	Spacewatch	·	2.3 km	MPC · JPL
878841	2013 AJ_{200}	—	January 5, 2013	Kitt Peak	Spacewatch	·	890 m	MPC · JPL
878842	2013 AK_{200}	—	January 10, 2013	Mount Lemmon	Mount Lemmon Survey	KON	2.1 km	MPC · JPL
878843	2013 AW_{206}	—	January 5, 2013	Kitt Peak	Spacewatch	·	1.5 km	MPC · JPL
878844	2013 AE_{209}	—	January 10, 2013	Haleakala	Pan-STARRS 1	·	2.0 km	MPC · JPL
878845	2013 AJ_{214}	—	January 4, 2013	Cerro Tololo	DECam	·	1.4 km	MPC · JPL
878846	2013 AO_{223}	—	January 5, 2013	Mount Lemmon	Mount Lemmon Survey	·	1.3 km	MPC · JPL
878847	2013 BB_{6}	—	January 16, 2013	Mount Lemmon	Mount Lemmon Survey	·	930 m	MPC · JPL
878848	2013 BZ_{11}	—	December 23, 2012	Haleakala	Pan-STARRS 1	·	1.1 km	MPC · JPL
878849	2013 BK_{15}	—	July 4, 2010	WISE	WISE	·	3.0 km	MPC · JPL
878850	2013 BM_{23}	—	January 17, 2013	Mount Lemmon	Mount Lemmon Survey	·	1.2 km	MPC · JPL
878851	2013 BK_{28}	—	November 7, 2007	Mount Lemmon	Mount Lemmon Survey	·	980 m	MPC · JPL
878852	2013 BD_{37}	—	September 20, 2011	Catalina	CSS	·	2.0 km	MPC · JPL
878853	2013 BM_{46}	—	December 23, 2012	Haleakala	Pan-STARRS 1	·	1.0 km	MPC · JPL
878854	2013 BP_{46}	—	December 22, 2012	Haleakala	Pan-STARRS 1	·	1.5 km	MPC · JPL
878855	2013 BC_{47}	—	January 7, 2013	Kitt Peak	Spacewatch	(5)	910 m	MPC · JPL
878856	2013 BX_{54}	—	January 17, 2013	Mount Lemmon	Mount Lemmon Survey	·	1.3 km	MPC · JPL
878857	2013 BC_{68}	—	January 9, 2013	Nogales	M. Schwartz, P. R. Holvorcem	·	1.1 km	MPC · JPL
878858	2013 BW_{71}	—	January 17, 2013	Haleakala	Pan-STARRS 1	·	1.2 km	MPC · JPL
878859	2013 BT_{74}	—	March 27, 2009	Mount Lemmon	Mount Lemmon Survey	·	940 m	MPC · JPL
878860	2013 BZ_{74}	—	January 17, 2013	Haleakala	Pan-STARRS 1	ADE	1.3 km	MPC · JPL
878861	2013 BF_{75}	—	January 17, 2013	Kitt Peak	Spacewatch	·	1.3 km	MPC · JPL
878862	2013 BS_{76}	—	January 31, 2013	Haleakala	Pan-STARRS 1	·	1.2 km	MPC · JPL
878863	2013 BW_{82}	—	January 18, 2013	Kitt Peak	Spacewatch	H	300 m	MPC · JPL
878864	2013 BN_{87}	—	January 19, 2013	Mount Lemmon	Mount Lemmon Survey	·	1.3 km	MPC · JPL
878865	2013 BJ_{94}	—	January 18, 2013	Mount Lemmon	Mount Lemmon Survey	·	1.3 km	MPC · JPL
878866	2013 BF_{95}	—	January 16, 2013	Haleakala	Pan-STARRS 1	·	1.1 km	MPC · JPL
878867	2013 BV_{96}	—	September 25, 2011	Mayhill-ISON	L. Elenin	·	1.6 km	MPC · JPL
878868	2013 BU_{97}	—	January 20, 2013	Mount Lemmon	Mount Lemmon Survey	H	330 m	MPC · JPL
878869	2013 BS_{103}	—	January 16, 2013	Haleakala	Pan-STARRS 1	·	1.2 km	MPC · JPL
878870	2013 BW_{106}	—	January 22, 2002	Kitt Peak	Spacewatch	·	1.8 km	MPC · JPL
878871	2013 CR_{2}	—	December 9, 2012	Mount Lemmon	Mount Lemmon Survey	THB	2.0 km	MPC · JPL
878872	2013 CU_{5}	—	February 2, 2013	Mount Lemmon	Mount Lemmon Survey	·	1.3 km	MPC · JPL
878873	2013 CY_{13}	—	February 1, 2013	Kitt Peak	Spacewatch	·	1.1 km	MPC · JPL
878874	2013 CN_{15}	—	January 10, 2013	Kitt Peak	Spacewatch	·	1.2 km	MPC · JPL
878875	2013 CT_{20}	—	September 19, 2011	Mount Lemmon	Mount Lemmon Survey	·	1.1 km	MPC · JPL
878876	2013 CH_{21}	—	March 3, 2009	Kitt Peak	Spacewatch	·	1.1 km	MPC · JPL
878877	2013 CR_{25}	—	March 31, 2009	Catalina	CSS	·	1.1 km	MPC · JPL
878878	2013 CP_{29}	—	January 18, 2013	Mount Lemmon	Mount Lemmon Survey	MIS	1.8 km	MPC · JPL
878879	2013 CB_{31}	—	February 5, 2013	Mount Lemmon	Mount Lemmon Survey	PHO	540 m	MPC · JPL
878880	2013 CC_{32}	—	January 7, 2013	Kitt Peak	Spacewatch	·	1.2 km	MPC · JPL
878881	2013 CM_{41}	—	February 3, 2013	Haleakala	Pan-STARRS 1	EUN	720 m	MPC · JPL
878882	2013 CM_{46}	—	February 5, 2013	Mount Lemmon	Mount Lemmon Survey	·	2.0 km	MPC · JPL
878883	2013 CK_{52}	—	February 8, 2013	Haleakala	Pan-STARRS 1	H	370 m	MPC · JPL
878884	2013 CO_{60}	—	February 5, 2013	Oukaïmeden	C. Rinner	·	1.1 km	MPC · JPL
878885	2013 CP_{60}	—	October 27, 2005	Kitt Peak	Spacewatch	·	430 m	MPC · JPL
878886	2013 CA_{68}	—	February 5, 2013	Catalina	CSS	ADE	1.4 km	MPC · JPL
878887	2013 CJ_{68}	—	February 8, 2013	Haleakala	Pan-STARRS 1	·	1.2 km	MPC · JPL
878888	2013 CJ_{70}	—	January 9, 2013	Kitt Peak	Spacewatch	·	460 m	MPC · JPL
878889	2013 CN_{71}	—	February 2, 2013	Mount Lemmon	Mount Lemmon Survey	·	1.2 km	MPC · JPL
878890	2013 CX_{79}	—	January 5, 2013	Mount Lemmon	Mount Lemmon Survey	·	1.4 km	MPC · JPL
878891	2013 CC_{88}	—	September 27, 2012	Haleakala	Pan-STARRS 1	H	510 m	MPC · JPL
878892	2013 CP_{98}	—	February 8, 2013	Haleakala	Pan-STARRS 1	·	1.5 km	MPC · JPL
878893	2013 CJ_{102}	—	January 20, 2013	Kitt Peak	Spacewatch	·	1.1 km	MPC · JPL
878894	2013 CA_{104}	—	January 20, 2013	Mount Lemmon	Mount Lemmon Survey	·	1.3 km	MPC · JPL
878895	2013 CR_{110}	—	February 2, 2013	Kitt Peak	Spacewatch	H	490 m	MPC · JPL
878896	2013 CN_{114}	—	October 20, 2012	Mount Lemmon	Mount Lemmon Survey	·	1.1 km	MPC · JPL
878897	2013 CZ_{119}	—	January 16, 2013	ESA OGS	ESA OGS	·	760 m	MPC · JPL
878898	2013 CL_{128}	—	January 13, 2013	Catalina	CSS	PHO	580 m	MPC · JPL
878899	2013 CX_{129}	—	February 14, 2013	Haleakala	Pan-STARRS 1	AMO	350 m	MPC · JPL
878900	2013 CP_{140}	—	February 14, 2013	Kitt Peak	Spacewatch	H	380 m	MPC · JPL

== 878901–879000 ==
back to top

Designation			Discovery			Properties		Ref
Permanent	Provisional	Named after	Date	Site	Discoverer(s)	Category	Diam.	Ref
878901	2013 CB_{141}	—	February 14, 2013	Kitt Peak	Spacewatch	KOR	1.0 km	MPC · JPL
878902	2013 CA_{159}	—	January 16, 2008	Kitt Peak	Spacewatch	·	1.1 km	MPC · JPL
878903	2013 CT_{163}	—	February 5, 2013	Kitt Peak	Spacewatch	·	1.4 km	MPC · JPL
878904	2013 CV_{166}	—	February 14, 2013	Kitt Peak	Spacewatch	·	580 m	MPC · JPL
878905	2013 CZ_{183}	—	December 8, 2012	Mount Lemmon	Mount Lemmon Survey	·	1.9 km	MPC · JPL
878906	2013 CG_{191}	—	January 9, 2013	Catalina	CSS	·	1.2 km	MPC · JPL
878907	2013 CX_{198}	—	February 15, 2013	Haleakala	Pan-STARRS 1	·	1.3 km	MPC · JPL
878908	2013 CW_{208}	—	February 14, 2013	Haleakala	Pan-STARRS 1	·	1.4 km	MPC · JPL
878909	2013 CA_{213}	—	February 7, 2013	Kitt Peak	Spacewatch	·	1.3 km	MPC · JPL
878910	2013 CK_{214}	—	February 8, 2013	Haleakala	Pan-STARRS 1	·	1.1 km	MPC · JPL
878911	2013 CU_{215}	—	February 8, 2013	Haleakala	Pan-STARRS 1	L4	5.9 km	MPC · JPL
878912	2013 CR_{218}	—	February 8, 2013	Haleakala	Pan-STARRS 1	·	1.5 km	MPC · JPL
878913	2013 CC_{231}	—	February 14, 2013	Haleakala	Pan-STARRS 1	·	1.4 km	MPC · JPL
878914	2013 CA_{232}	—	February 3, 2013	Haleakala	Pan-STARRS 1	H	410 m	MPC · JPL
878915	2013 CH_{233}	—	February 8, 2013	Haleakala	Pan-STARRS 1	·	1.2 km	MPC · JPL
878916	2013 CE_{236}	—	December 28, 2016	Mount Lemmon	Mount Lemmon Survey	HNS	890 m	MPC · JPL
878917	2013 CM_{237}	—	February 15, 2013	Haleakala	Pan-STARRS 1	HNS	790 m	MPC · JPL
878918	2013 CP_{237}	—	February 3, 2013	Haleakala	Pan-STARRS 1	·	1.3 km	MPC · JPL
878919	2013 CO_{241}	—	February 8, 2013	Haleakala	Pan-STARRS 1	·	930 m	MPC · JPL
878920	2013 CP_{250}	—	February 15, 2013	Haleakala	Pan-STARRS 1	·	940 m	MPC · JPL
878921	2013 CT_{252}	—	February 3, 2013	Haleakala	Pan-STARRS 1	·	1.4 km	MPC · JPL
878922	2013 CU_{255}	—	February 11, 2004	Palomar	NEAT	·	1.3 km	MPC · JPL
878923	2013 CY_{269}	—	February 15, 2013	Haleakala	Pan-STARRS 1	·	1.3 km	MPC · JPL
878924	2013 DN_{5}	—	February 8, 2013	Haleakala	Pan-STARRS 1	·	670 m	MPC · JPL
878925	2013 DF_{8}	—	February 5, 2013	Mount Lemmon	Mount Lemmon Survey	·	2.1 km	MPC · JPL
878926	2013 DE_{9}	—	February 11, 2013	Catalina	CSS	·	980 m	MPC · JPL
878927	2013 DS_{21}	—	February 18, 2013	Kitt Peak	Spacewatch	·	1.0 km	MPC · JPL
878928	2013 DB_{22}	—	February 16, 2013	Kitt Peak	Spacewatch	·	1.0 km	MPC · JPL
878929	2013 DD_{22}	—	February 17, 2013	Kitt Peak	Spacewatch	·	1.0 km	MPC · JPL
878930	2013 EV_{1}	—	January 9, 2013	Mount Lemmon	Mount Lemmon Survey	·	1.4 km	MPC · JPL
878931	2013 ER_{6}	—	February 10, 2008	Kitt Peak	Spacewatch	·	1.4 km	MPC · JPL
878932	2013 EL_{14}	—	February 7, 2013	Kitt Peak	Spacewatch	JUN	700 m	MPC · JPL
878933	2013 ES_{15}	—	February 7, 2013	Kitt Peak	Spacewatch	·	1.2 km	MPC · JPL
878934	2013 EW_{21}	—	March 5, 2013	Mount Lemmon	Mount Lemmon Survey	·	1.1 km	MPC · JPL
878935	2013 EO_{25}	—	March 7, 2013	Kitt Peak	Spacewatch	GEF	830 m	MPC · JPL
878936	2013 EC_{30}	—	December 20, 2000	Kitt Peak	Deep Lens Survey	·	1.0 km	MPC · JPL
878937	2013 ED_{43}	—	February 14, 2013	Kitt Peak	Spacewatch	NEM	1.5 km	MPC · JPL
878938	2013 EG_{60}	—	March 8, 2013	Haleakala	Pan-STARRS 1	HOF	1.9 km	MPC · JPL
878939	2013 EM_{64}	—	February 17, 2013	Kitt Peak	Spacewatch	H	320 m	MPC · JPL
878940	2013 EZ_{66}	—	March 11, 2013	Mount Lemmon	Mount Lemmon Survey	PHO	760 m	MPC · JPL
878941	2013 EH_{74}	—	February 5, 2013	Kitt Peak	Spacewatch	·	1.3 km	MPC · JPL
878942	2013 EL_{77}	—	September 16, 2010	Kitt Peak	Spacewatch	KOR	1.2 km	MPC · JPL
878943	2013 EE_{80}	—	February 19, 2013	Kitt Peak	Spacewatch	·	820 m	MPC · JPL
878944	2013 EU_{82}	—	March 8, 2013	Haleakala	Pan-STARRS 1	EUN	840 m	MPC · JPL
878945	2013 EA_{89}	—	April 10, 2002	Socorro	LINEAR	·	970 m	MPC · JPL
878946	2013 EA_{92}	—	April 17, 1996	La Silla	E. W. Elst	MIS	3.1 km	MPC · JPL
878947	2013 EK_{104}	—	September 16, 2003	Kitt Peak	Spacewatch	H	390 m	MPC · JPL
878948	2013 EB_{107}	—	April 3, 2008	Mount Lemmon	Mount Lemmon Survey	·	1.7 km	MPC · JPL
878949	2013 EE_{112}	—	March 6, 2013	Haleakala	Pan-STARRS 1	·	800 m	MPC · JPL
878950	2013 EL_{113}	—	March 4, 2013	Haleakala	Pan-STARRS 1	·	1.6 km	MPC · JPL
878951	2013 EA_{124}	—	March 15, 2013	Mount Lemmon	Mount Lemmon Survey	·	1.5 km	MPC · JPL
878952	2013 ED_{127}	—	February 19, 2013	XuYi	PMO NEO Survey Program	PHO	880 m	MPC · JPL
878953	2013 EH_{157}	—	March 12, 2013	Kitt Peak	Spacewatch	·	620 m	MPC · JPL
878954	2013 EM_{160}	—	March 3, 2013	Mount Lemmon	Mount Lemmon Survey	·	900 m	MPC · JPL
878955	2013 EN_{162}	—	March 5, 2013	Haleakala	Pan-STARRS 1	·	990 m	MPC · JPL
878956	2013 EG_{163}	—	March 3, 2013	Mount Lemmon	Mount Lemmon Survey	·	580 m	MPC · JPL
878957	2013 EX_{164}	—	March 4, 2013	Haleakala	Pan-STARRS 1	·	1.5 km	MPC · JPL
878958	2013 ED_{166}	—	March 12, 2013	Kitt Peak	Spacewatch	·	2.3 km	MPC · JPL
878959	2013 EU_{167}	—	March 4, 2013	Haleakala	Pan-STARRS 1	·	1.7 km	MPC · JPL
878960	2013 EC_{172}	—	March 13, 2013	Mount Lemmon	Mount Lemmon Survey	KOR	860 m	MPC · JPL
878961	2013 EU_{172}	—	March 13, 2013	Palomar	Palomar Transient Factory	·	1.4 km	MPC · JPL
878962	2013 ED_{175}	—	March 7, 2013	Haleakala	Pan-STARRS 1	·	1.3 km	MPC · JPL
878963	2013 EE_{175}	—	March 5, 2013	Haleakala	Pan-STARRS 1	·	1.2 km	MPC · JPL
878964	2013 EG_{175}	—	March 13, 2013	Palomar	Palomar Transient Factory	H	320 m	MPC · JPL
878965	2013 EN_{181}	—	February 15, 2013	Haleakala	Pan-STARRS 1	·	1.3 km	MPC · JPL
878966	2013 ED_{184}	—	March 5, 2013	Mount Lemmon	Mount Lemmon Survey	LUT	2.7 km	MPC · JPL
878967	2013 FF	—	March 17, 2013	Mount Lemmon	Mount Lemmon Survey	H	440 m	MPC · JPL
878968	2013 FX_{1}	—	March 21, 2004	Kitt Peak	Spacewatch	·	1.2 km	MPC · JPL
878969	2013 FE_{2}	—	March 5, 2013	Haleakala	Pan-STARRS 1	·	1.8 km	MPC · JPL
878970	2013 FZ_{2}	—	February 7, 2013	Kitt Peak	Spacewatch	·	1.4 km	MPC · JPL
878971	2013 FV_{6}	—	March 18, 2013	Kitt Peak	Spacewatch	ADE	1.4 km	MPC · JPL
878972	2013 FV_{19}	—	March 7, 2013	Kitt Peak	Spacewatch	·	1.5 km	MPC · JPL
878973	2013 FO_{28}	—	March 16, 2013	Cerro Tololo	S. S. Sheppard, C. A. Trujillo	res · 1:2	192 km	MPC · JPL
878974	2013 FC_{34}	—	March 18, 2013	Mount Lemmon	Mount Lemmon Survey	·	1.3 km	MPC · JPL
878975	2013 FP_{35}	—	March 18, 2013	Mount Lemmon	Mount Lemmon Survey	·	1.8 km	MPC · JPL
878976	2013 FA_{41}	—	March 24, 2013	Mount Lemmon	Mount Lemmon Survey	·	1.1 km	MPC · JPL
878977	2013 GH_{3}	—	March 12, 2013	Mount Lemmon	Mount Lemmon Survey	H	440 m	MPC · JPL
878978	2013 GS_{5}	—	April 26, 2006	Kitt Peak	Spacewatch	NYS	780 m	MPC · JPL
878979	2013 GK_{17}	—	March 13, 2013	Palomar	Palomar Transient Factory	·	1.4 km	MPC · JPL
878980	2013 GD_{27}	—	April 5, 2013	Palomar	Palomar Transient Factory	H	360 m	MPC · JPL
878981	2013 GJ_{29}	—	March 31, 2013	Mount Lemmon	Mount Lemmon Survey	·	1.5 km	MPC · JPL
878982	2013 GE_{39}	—	January 19, 2008	Mount Lemmon	Mount Lemmon Survey	·	1.4 km	MPC · JPL
878983	2013 GX_{56}	—	March 7, 2013	Kitt Peak	Spacewatch	·	1.5 km	MPC · JPL
878984	2013 GD_{69}	—	August 24, 2011	Haleakala	Pan-STARRS 1	H	390 m	MPC · JPL
878985	2013 GE_{75}	—	April 2, 2013	Mount Lemmon	Mount Lemmon Survey	JUN	640 m	MPC · JPL
878986	2013 GF_{82}	—	March 16, 2013	Kitt Peak	Spacewatch	·	720 m	MPC · JPL
878987	2013 GM_{109}	—	March 23, 2013	Palomar	Palomar Transient Factory	PHO	700 m	MPC · JPL
878988	2013 GH_{116}	—	April 5, 2013	Palomar	Palomar Transient Factory	526	1.7 km	MPC · JPL
878989	2013 GJ_{116}	—	March 4, 2013	Haleakala	Pan-STARRS 1	H	350 m	MPC · JPL
878990	2013 GE_{145}	—	April 15, 2013	Haleakala	Pan-STARRS 1	·	1.3 km	MPC · JPL
878991	2013 GN_{145}	—	April 6, 2013	Haleakala	Pan-STARRS 1	·	1.7 km	MPC · JPL
878992	2013 GQ_{146}	—	April 7, 2013	Kitt Peak	Spacewatch	·	1.3 km	MPC · JPL
878993	2013 GT_{146}	—	April 15, 2013	Haleakala	Pan-STARRS 1	TIR	1.9 km	MPC · JPL
878994	2013 GB_{149}	—	April 10, 2013	Haleakala	Pan-STARRS 1	·	1.4 km	MPC · JPL
878995	2013 GY_{154}	—	April 11, 2013	Mount Lemmon	Mount Lemmon Survey	·	1.5 km	MPC · JPL
878996	2013 GN_{156}	—	April 12, 2013	Haleakala	Pan-STARRS 1	·	1.6 km	MPC · JPL
878997	2013 GY_{156}	—	April 8, 2013	Mount Lemmon	Mount Lemmon Survey	·	1.2 km	MPC · JPL
878998	2013 GD_{157}	—	April 12, 2013	Haleakala	Pan-STARRS 1	·	1.4 km	MPC · JPL
878999	2013 GF_{157}	—	April 10, 2013	Mount Lemmon	Mount Lemmon Survey	·	1.7 km	MPC · JPL
879000	2013 GQ_{157}	—	April 5, 2013	Haleakala	Pan-STARRS 1	JUN	780 m	MPC · JPL

back to top
