= List of minor planets: 755001–756000 =

The following is a partial list of minor planets, running from minor-planet number 755001 through 756000, inclusive. The primary data for this and other partial lists is based on JPL's "Small-Body Orbital Elements" and data available from the Minor Planet Center. Critical list information is also provided by the MPC, unless otherwise specified from Lowell Observatory. A detailed description of the table's columns and additional sources are given on the main page including a complete list of every page in this series, and a statistical break-up on the dynamical classification of minor planets.

Also see the summary list of all named bodies in numerical and alphabetical order, and the corresponding naming citations for the number range of this particular list. New namings may only be added to this list after official publication, as the preannouncement of names is condemned by the Working Group for Small Bodies Nomenclature of the International Astronomical Union.

| Near-Earth obj. | MBA (inner) | MBA (outer) | Centaur |
| Mars-crosser | MBA (middle) | Jupiter trojan | Trans-Neptunian obj. |
| Unclassified |

== 755001–755100 ==
| Designation | | | Discovery | | | Properties | | Ref |
| Permanent | Provisional | Named after | Date | Site | Discoverer(s) | Category | Diam. | Ref |
|---|---|---|---|---|---|---|---|---|
| 755001 | 2016 WU_{12} | — | December 6, 2012 | Catalina | CSS | · | 1.4 km | MPC · JPL |
| 755002 Richer | 2016 WS_{14} | Richer | June 4, 2011 | Cerro Tololo | EURONEAR | · | 1.4 km | MPC · JPL |
| 755003 | 2016 WB_{16} | — | October 26, 2016 | Mount Lemmon | Mount Lemmon Survey | MIS | 1.9 km | MPC · JPL |
| 755004 | 2016 WV_{19} | — | August 28, 2005 | Kitt Peak | Spacewatch | · | 2.0 km | MPC · JPL |
| 755005 | 2016 WP_{20} | — | October 12, 2016 | Haleakala | Pan-STARRS 1 | · | 1.7 km | MPC · JPL |
| 755006 | 2016 WU_{20} | — | November 5, 2016 | Mount Lemmon | Mount Lemmon Survey | MAR | 870 m | MPC · JPL |
| 755007 | 2016 WH_{22} | — | December 10, 2009 | Mount Lemmon | Mount Lemmon Survey | · | 740 m | MPC · JPL |
| 755008 | 2016 WQ_{22} | — | October 29, 2008 | Kitt Peak | Spacewatch | (5) | 780 m | MPC · JPL |
| 755009 | 2016 WP_{23} | — | November 26, 2012 | Mount Lemmon | Mount Lemmon Survey | (5) | 1.1 km | MPC · JPL |
| 755010 | 2016 WT_{23} | — | November 19, 2012 | Kitt Peak | Spacewatch | · | 980 m | MPC · JPL |
| 755011 | 2016 WQ_{24} | — | December 19, 2014 | Haleakala | Pan-STARRS 1 | H | 510 m | MPC · JPL |
| 755012 | 2016 WZ_{24} | — | November 19, 2008 | Kitt Peak | Spacewatch | (5) | 730 m | MPC · JPL |
| 755013 | 2016 WP_{25} | — | April 23, 2014 | Cerro Tololo | DECam | EUN | 740 m | MPC · JPL |
| 755014 | 2016 WZ_{25} | — | February 13, 2010 | Mount Lemmon | Mount Lemmon Survey | · | 1.1 km | MPC · JPL |
| 755015 | 2016 WH_{26} | — | May 30, 2014 | Haleakala | Pan-STARRS 1 | · | 1.5 km | MPC · JPL |
| 755016 | 2016 WM_{27} | — | October 3, 2003 | Kitt Peak | Spacewatch | · | 1.0 km | MPC · JPL |
| 755017 | 2016 WW_{29} | — | March 28, 2014 | Mount Lemmon | Mount Lemmon Survey | · | 1.1 km | MPC · JPL |
| 755018 | 2016 WY_{29} | — | October 1, 2003 | Kitt Peak | Spacewatch | ADE | 1.5 km | MPC · JPL |
| 755019 | 2016 WZ_{31} | — | March 16, 2005 | Catalina | CSS | · | 1.2 km | MPC · JPL |
| 755020 | 2016 WA_{32} | — | October 13, 2016 | Mount Lemmon | Mount Lemmon Survey | · | 1.0 km | MPC · JPL |
| 755021 | 2016 WH_{32} | — | June 19, 2015 | Haleakala | Pan-STARRS 1 | EMA | 2.6 km | MPC · JPL |
| 755022 | 2016 WJ_{32} | — | December 10, 2012 | Mount Lemmon | Mount Lemmon Survey | KON | 1.9 km | MPC · JPL |
| 755023 | 2016 WY_{33} | — | December 3, 2012 | Mount Lemmon | Mount Lemmon Survey | · | 1.3 km | MPC · JPL |
| 755024 | 2016 WN_{34} | — | October 22, 2008 | Kitt Peak | Spacewatch | · | 880 m | MPC · JPL |
| 755025 | 2016 WX_{36} | — | November 25, 2016 | Mount Lemmon | Mount Lemmon Survey | MAR | 780 m | MPC · JPL |
| 755026 | 2016 WA_{37} | — | March 30, 2014 | Cerro Tololo | DECam | · | 850 m | MPC · JPL |
| 755027 | 2016 WD_{37} | — | June 22, 2015 | Haleakala | Pan-STARRS 1 | · | 1.0 km | MPC · JPL |
| 755028 | 2016 WF_{37} | — | October 26, 2016 | Haleakala | Pan-STARRS 1 | · | 1.1 km | MPC · JPL |
| 755029 | 2016 WN_{37} | — | October 26, 2016 | Haleakala | Pan-STARRS 1 | · | 1.1 km | MPC · JPL |
| 755030 | 2016 WW_{37} | — | February 3, 2013 | Haleakala | Pan-STARRS 1 | · | 1.5 km | MPC · JPL |
| 755031 | 2016 WN_{40} | — | September 28, 2003 | Kitt Peak | Spacewatch | · | 970 m | MPC · JPL |
| 755032 | 2016 WU_{43} | — | May 7, 2010 | Mount Lemmon | Mount Lemmon Survey | H | 460 m | MPC · JPL |
| 755033 | 2016 WA_{44} | — | January 1, 2009 | Kitt Peak | Spacewatch | · | 610 m | MPC · JPL |
| 755034 | 2016 WB_{44} | — | November 14, 1995 | Kitt Peak | Spacewatch | · | 1.5 km | MPC · JPL |
| 755035 | 2016 WZ_{44} | — | January 14, 2013 | Mount Lemmon | Mount Lemmon Survey | · | 1.2 km | MPC · JPL |
| 755036 | 2016 WH_{45} | — | October 14, 2007 | Mount Lemmon | Mount Lemmon Survey | · | 1.2 km | MPC · JPL |
| 755037 | 2016 WV_{45} | — | June 26, 2015 | Haleakala | Pan-STARRS 1 | · | 1.2 km | MPC · JPL |
| 755038 | 2016 WX_{45} | — | October 10, 1999 | Kitt Peak | Spacewatch | · | 780 m | MPC · JPL |
| 755039 | 2016 WO_{47} | — | September 10, 2016 | Mount Lemmon | Mount Lemmon Survey | · | 960 m | MPC · JPL |
| 755040 | 2016 WD_{48} | — | October 13, 2016 | Haleakala | Pan-STARRS 1 | · | 1.2 km | MPC · JPL |
| 755041 | 2016 WK_{48} | — | June 28, 2013 | Haleakala | Pan-STARRS 1 | H | 570 m | MPC · JPL |
| 755042 | 2016 WY_{49} | — | October 20, 2003 | Kitt Peak | Spacewatch | JUN | 820 m | MPC · JPL |
| 755043 | 2016 WF_{50} | — | October 4, 2007 | Kitt Peak | Spacewatch | · | 1.5 km | MPC · JPL |
| 755044 | 2016 WG_{50} | — | October 20, 2007 | Mount Lemmon | Mount Lemmon Survey | · | 1.6 km | MPC · JPL |
| 755045 | 2016 WS_{50} | — | October 20, 2003 | Kitt Peak | Spacewatch | · | 1.2 km | MPC · JPL |
| 755046 | 2016 WW_{50} | — | October 23, 2016 | Mount Lemmon | Mount Lemmon Survey | (5) | 780 m | MPC · JPL |
| 755047 | 2016 WZ_{51} | — | August 4, 2005 | Palomar | NEAT | · | 880 m | MPC · JPL |
| 755048 | 2016 WA_{53} | — | October 4, 2007 | Catalina | CSS | · | 1.4 km | MPC · JPL |
| 755049 | 2016 WB_{53} | — | February 4, 2005 | Mount Lemmon | Mount Lemmon Survey | (5) | 830 m | MPC · JPL |
| 755050 | 2016 WC_{54} | — | September 30, 2009 | Mount Lemmon | Mount Lemmon Survey | · | 700 m | MPC · JPL |
| 755051 | 2016 WF_{54} | — | October 9, 2005 | Kitt Peak | Spacewatch | · | 730 m | MPC · JPL |
| 755052 | 2016 WK_{54} | — | October 27, 2005 | Kitt Peak | Spacewatch | NYS | 730 m | MPC · JPL |
| 755053 | 2016 WS_{54} | — | November 11, 2016 | Mount Lemmon | Mount Lemmon Survey | H | 430 m | MPC · JPL |
| 755054 | 2016 WL_{55} | — | October 21, 2001 | Socorro | LINEAR | NYS | 1.1 km | MPC · JPL |
| 755055 | 2016 WF_{56} | — | October 22, 2012 | Haleakala | Pan-STARRS 1 | · | 730 m | MPC · JPL |
| 755056 | 2016 WJ_{58} | — | November 18, 2016 | Mount Lemmon | Mount Lemmon Survey | · | 1.3 km | MPC · JPL |
| 755057 | 2016 WX_{59} | — | November 19, 2016 | Mount Lemmon | Mount Lemmon Survey | · | 1.2 km | MPC · JPL |
| 755058 | 2016 WV_{60} | — | November 25, 2016 | Mount Lemmon | Mount Lemmon Survey | · | 1.3 km | MPC · JPL |
| 755059 | 2016 WL_{61} | — | November 19, 2016 | Mount Lemmon | Mount Lemmon Survey | · | 1.0 km | MPC · JPL |
| 755060 | 2016 WP_{61} | — | November 24, 2016 | Mount Lemmon | Mount Lemmon Survey | H | 520 m | MPC · JPL |
| 755061 | 2016 WC_{62} | — | November 20, 2016 | Mount Lemmon | Mount Lemmon Survey | · | 1.2 km | MPC · JPL |
| 755062 | 2016 WU_{62} | — | November 24, 2016 | Mount Lemmon | Mount Lemmon Survey | · | 1.1 km | MPC · JPL |
| 755063 | 2016 WW_{62} | — | November 23, 2016 | Mount Lemmon | Mount Lemmon Survey | · | 1.5 km | MPC · JPL |
| 755064 | 2016 WL_{63} | — | October 13, 2016 | Haleakala | Pan-STARRS 1 | · | 1 km | MPC · JPL |
| 755065 | 2016 WS_{65} | — | November 23, 2016 | Mount Lemmon | Mount Lemmon Survey | · | 930 m | MPC · JPL |
| 755066 | 2016 WT_{65} | — | January 18, 2009 | Mount Lemmon | Mount Lemmon Survey | · | 1.2 km | MPC · JPL |
| 755067 | 2016 WH_{66} | — | November 25, 2016 | Mount Lemmon | Mount Lemmon Survey | MAR | 710 m | MPC · JPL |
| 755068 | 2016 WP_{66} | — | November 18, 2016 | Mount Lemmon | Mount Lemmon Survey | EUN | 890 m | MPC · JPL |
| 755069 | 2016 WS_{66} | — | November 23, 2016 | Mount Lemmon | Mount Lemmon Survey | · | 1.2 km | MPC · JPL |
| 755070 | 2016 WT_{67} | — | November 20, 2016 | Mount Lemmon | Mount Lemmon Survey | · | 930 m | MPC · JPL |
| 755071 | 2016 WA_{76} | — | October 23, 2011 | Haleakala | Pan-STARRS 1 | · | 1.5 km | MPC · JPL |
| 755072 | 2016 XP | — | November 11, 2016 | Mount Lemmon | Mount Lemmon Survey | · | 790 m | MPC · JPL |
| 755073 | 2016 XE_{1} | — | September 8, 1999 | Socorro | LINEAR | · | 1.2 km | MPC · JPL |
| 755074 | 2016 XW_{1} | — | June 8, 2005 | Kitt Peak | Spacewatch | H | 420 m | MPC · JPL |
| 755075 | 2016 XR_{2} | — | December 1, 2016 | Atom Site | Space Surveillance Telescope | H | 470 m | MPC · JPL |
| 755076 | 2016 XQ_{3} | — | November 13, 2012 | Mount Lemmon | Mount Lemmon Survey | ADE | 1.4 km | MPC · JPL |
| 755077 | 2016 XK_{6} | — | October 26, 2016 | Mount Lemmon | Mount Lemmon Survey | · | 1.2 km | MPC · JPL |
| 755078 | 2016 XR_{6} | — | December 19, 2004 | Mount Lemmon | Mount Lemmon Survey | · | 530 m | MPC · JPL |
| 755079 | 2016 XP_{7} | — | October 6, 2016 | Mount Lemmon | Mount Lemmon Survey | · | 1.2 km | MPC · JPL |
| 755080 | 2016 XC_{8} | — | March 31, 2015 | Haleakala | Pan-STARRS 1 | · | 820 m | MPC · JPL |
| 755081 | 2016 XU_{10} | — | November 4, 2016 | Haleakala | Pan-STARRS 1 | · | 990 m | MPC · JPL |
| 755082 | 2016 XZ_{13} | — | June 29, 2015 | Haleakala | Pan-STARRS 1 | · | 1.4 km | MPC · JPL |
| 755083 | 2016 XU_{14} | — | June 23, 2009 | Mount Lemmon | Mount Lemmon Survey | · | 690 m | MPC · JPL |
| 755084 | 2016 XS_{15} | — | June 18, 2015 | Haleakala | Pan-STARRS 1 | · | 1.2 km | MPC · JPL |
| 755085 | 2016 XX_{15} | — | June 4, 2011 | Mount Lemmon | Mount Lemmon Survey | · | 1.1 km | MPC · JPL |
| 755086 | 2016 XA_{16} | — | August 26, 2012 | Haleakala | Pan-STARRS 1 | · | 1.1 km | MPC · JPL |
| 755087 | 2016 XL_{16} | — | October 26, 2016 | Haleakala | Pan-STARRS 1 | · | 800 m | MPC · JPL |
| 755088 | 2016 XZ_{16} | — | October 29, 2016 | Mount Lemmon | Mount Lemmon Survey | · | 1.2 km | MPC · JPL |
| 755089 | 2016 XA_{17} | — | November 13, 2012 | Kitt Peak | Spacewatch | · | 1.2 km | MPC · JPL |
| 755090 | 2016 XB_{17} | — | November 22, 2012 | Kitt Peak | Spacewatch | · | 990 m | MPC · JPL |
| 755091 | 2016 XC_{17} | — | May 23, 2014 | Haleakala | Pan-STARRS 1 | KON | 1.7 km | MPC · JPL |
| 755092 | 2016 XD_{17} | — | January 18, 2013 | Haleakala | Pan-STARRS 1 | · | 1.8 km | MPC · JPL |
| 755093 | 2016 XA_{19} | — | November 10, 2016 | Mount Lemmon | Mount Lemmon Survey | · | 1.1 km | MPC · JPL |
| 755094 | 2016 XG_{19} | — | December 4, 2008 | Mount Lemmon | Mount Lemmon Survey | EUN | 1.2 km | MPC · JPL |
| 755095 | 2016 XO_{19} | — | December 6, 2008 | Kitt Peak | Spacewatch | (5) | 1.0 km | MPC · JPL |
| 755096 | 2016 XP_{19} | — | October 9, 2016 | Mount Lemmon | Mount Lemmon Survey | · | 1.4 km | MPC · JPL |
| 755097 | 2016 XJ_{22} | — | December 6, 2016 | Oukaïmeden | M. Ory | · | 1.4 km | MPC · JPL |
| 755098 | 2016 XW_{22} | — | December 22, 2012 | Haleakala | Pan-STARRS 1 | EUN | 1.1 km | MPC · JPL |
| 755099 | 2016 XN_{24} | — | October 21, 2012 | Mount Lemmon | Mount Lemmon Survey | JUN | 770 m | MPC · JPL |
| 755100 | 2016 XT_{24} | — | March 12, 2014 | Kitt Peak | Spacewatch | · | 910 m | MPC · JPL |

== 755101–755200 ==
back to top

| Designation | | | Discovery | | | Properties | | Ref |
| Permanent | Provisional | Named after | Date | Site | Discoverer(s) | Category | Diam. | Ref |
|---|---|---|---|---|---|---|---|---|
| 755101 | 2016 XL_{26} | — | December 4, 2016 | Mount Lemmon | Mount Lemmon Survey | · | 520 m | MPC · JPL |
| 755102 | 2016 XT_{26} | — | December 4, 2016 | Mount Lemmon | Mount Lemmon Survey | · | 1.9 km | MPC · JPL |
| 755103 | 2016 XY_{27} | — | December 8, 2016 | Mount Lemmon | Mount Lemmon Survey | · | 1.2 km | MPC · JPL |
| 755104 | 2016 XF_{28} | — | December 4, 2016 | Mount Lemmon | Mount Lemmon Survey | EUN | 930 m | MPC · JPL |
| 755105 | 2016 XL_{29} | — | December 9, 2016 | Mount Lemmon | Mount Lemmon Survey | · | 980 m | MPC · JPL |
| 755106 | 2016 XX_{29} | — | November 9, 2007 | Catalina | CSS | EUN | 900 m | MPC · JPL |
| 755107 | 2016 XF_{30} | — | December 5, 2016 | Mount Lemmon | Mount Lemmon Survey | · | 1.2 km | MPC · JPL |
| 755108 | 2016 XK_{30} | — | December 6, 2016 | Mount Lemmon | Mount Lemmon Survey | · | 1.0 km | MPC · JPL |
| 755109 | 2016 XD_{31} | — | December 10, 2016 | Mount Lemmon | Mount Lemmon Survey | · | 1.4 km | MPC · JPL |
| 755110 | 2016 XH_{31} | — | December 1, 2016 | Mount Lemmon | Mount Lemmon Survey | · | 880 m | MPC · JPL |
| 755111 | 2016 XN_{39} | — | December 4, 2016 | Mount Lemmon | Mount Lemmon Survey | L5 | 9.6 km | MPC · JPL |
| 755112 | 2016 YE_{2} | — | December 20, 2004 | Mount Lemmon | Mount Lemmon Survey | · | 1.2 km | MPC · JPL |
| 755113 | 2016 YU_{2} | — | April 17, 2009 | Kitt Peak | Spacewatch | JUN | 920 m | MPC · JPL |
| 755114 | 2016 YV_{5} | — | September 26, 2011 | Haleakala | Pan-STARRS 1 | · | 1.1 km | MPC · JPL |
| 755115 | 2016 YJ_{6} | — | July 1, 2011 | Mount Lemmon | Mount Lemmon Survey | · | 1.4 km | MPC · JPL |
| 755116 | 2016 YM_{6} | — | November 13, 2012 | Mount Lemmon | Mount Lemmon Survey | · | 1.1 km | MPC · JPL |
| 755117 | 2016 YJ_{11} | — | December 13, 2012 | Mount Lemmon | Mount Lemmon Survey | · | 1.1 km | MPC · JPL |
| 755118 | 2016 YU_{11} | — | December 21, 2008 | Catalina | CSS | H | 490 m | MPC · JPL |
| 755119 | 2016 YG_{12} | — | November 21, 2003 | Socorro | LINEAR | · | 1.2 km | MPC · JPL |
| 755120 | 2016 YR_{12} | — | October 25, 2011 | Haleakala | Pan-STARRS 1 | · | 1.5 km | MPC · JPL |
| 755121 | 2016 YQ_{15} | — | December 27, 2016 | Mount Lemmon | Mount Lemmon Survey | · | 1.5 km | MPC · JPL |
| 755122 | 2016 YS_{15} | — | December 23, 2016 | Haleakala | Pan-STARRS 1 | · | 1.3 km | MPC · JPL |
| 755123 | 2016 YB_{16} | — | December 24, 2016 | Haleakala | Pan-STARRS 1 | · | 1.7 km | MPC · JPL |
| 755124 | 2016 YQ_{16} | — | December 22, 2016 | Haleakala | Pan-STARRS 1 | · | 1.2 km | MPC · JPL |
| 755125 | 2016 YE_{18} | — | December 23, 2016 | Haleakala | Pan-STARRS 1 | · | 1.9 km | MPC · JPL |
| 755126 | 2016 YH_{18} | — | December 23, 2016 | Haleakala | Pan-STARRS 1 | · | 1.1 km | MPC · JPL |
| 755127 | 2016 YQ_{18} | — | December 23, 2016 | Haleakala | Pan-STARRS 1 | L5 | 7.7 km | MPC · JPL |
| 755128 | 2016 YT_{18} | — | December 22, 2016 | Haleakala | Pan-STARRS 1 | L5 | 9.8 km | MPC · JPL |
| 755129 | 2016 YH_{19} | — | December 23, 2016 | Haleakala | Pan-STARRS 1 | L5 | 8.1 km | MPC · JPL |
| 755130 | 2016 YK_{20} | — | December 27, 2016 | Mount Lemmon | Mount Lemmon Survey | · | 1.9 km | MPC · JPL |
| 755131 | 2016 YR_{20} | — | December 22, 2016 | Haleakala | Pan-STARRS 1 | · | 850 m | MPC · JPL |
| 755132 | 2016 YY_{21} | — | December 24, 2016 | Haleakala | Pan-STARRS 1 | · | 1.4 km | MPC · JPL |
| 755133 | 2016 YO_{23} | — | December 24, 2016 | Mount Lemmon | Mount Lemmon Survey | · | 1.3 km | MPC · JPL |
| 755134 | 2016 YZ_{23} | — | January 10, 2013 | Mount Lemmon | Mount Lemmon Survey | · | 1.1 km | MPC · JPL |
| 755135 | 2016 YL_{24} | — | December 30, 2016 | Mount Lemmon | Mount Lemmon Survey | · | 1.2 km | MPC · JPL |
| 755136 | 2016 YC_{33} | — | December 25, 2016 | Haleakala | Pan-STARRS 1 | TRE | 1.9 km | MPC · JPL |
| 755137 | 2016 YA_{38} | — | December 23, 2016 | Haleakala | Pan-STARRS 1 | L5 | 9.0 km | MPC · JPL |
| 755138 | 2017 AC_{4} | — | January 2, 2017 | Haleakala | Pan-STARRS 1 | · | 770 m | MPC · JPL |
| 755139 | 2017 AE_{4} | — | December 9, 2016 | Mount Lemmon | Mount Lemmon Survey | H | 450 m | MPC · JPL |
| 755140 | 2017 AE_{5} | — | January 4, 2017 | Mount Lemmon | Mount Lemmon Survey | APO | 130 m | MPC · JPL |
| 755141 | 2017 AJ_{6} | — | December 7, 1999 | Kitt Peak | Spacewatch | · | 1.1 km | MPC · JPL |
| 755142 | 2017 AX_{6} | — | September 26, 2003 | Apache Point | SDSS | · | 1.3 km | MPC · JPL |
| 755143 | 2017 AV_{7} | — | October 2, 2006 | Mount Lemmon | Mount Lemmon Survey | · | 1.5 km | MPC · JPL |
| 755144 | 2017 AY_{7} | — | December 23, 2016 | Haleakala | Pan-STARRS 1 | · | 1.7 km | MPC · JPL |
| 755145 | 2017 AF_{10} | — | October 23, 2011 | Kitt Peak | Spacewatch | · | 1.5 km | MPC · JPL |
| 755146 | 2017 AB_{11} | — | July 4, 2014 | Haleakala | Pan-STARRS 1 | · | 1.4 km | MPC · JPL |
| 755147 | 2017 AK_{11} | — | December 12, 2012 | Mount Lemmon | Mount Lemmon Survey | · | 1.5 km | MPC · JPL |
| 755148 | 2017 AD_{12} | — | October 25, 2011 | Haleakala | Pan-STARRS 1 | · | 1.8 km | MPC · JPL |
| 755149 | 2017 AW_{13} | — | September 17, 2013 | Mount Lemmon | Mount Lemmon Survey | H | 540 m | MPC · JPL |
| 755150 | 2017 AD_{16} | — | October 25, 2011 | Haleakala | Pan-STARRS 1 | · | 1.5 km | MPC · JPL |
| 755151 | 2017 AQ_{16} | — | November 10, 2016 | Haleakala | Pan-STARRS 1 | · | 1.4 km | MPC · JPL |
| 755152 | 2017 AQ_{18} | — | October 14, 2001 | Apache Point | SDSS | · | 870 m | MPC · JPL |
| 755153 | 2017 AD_{19} | — | July 14, 2016 | Mount Lemmon | Mount Lemmon Survey | · | 1.8 km | MPC · JPL |
| 755154 | 2017 AA_{20} | — | February 5, 2013 | Kitt Peak | Spacewatch | · | 850 m | MPC · JPL |
| 755155 | 2017 AB_{20} | — | March 5, 2013 | Nogales | M. Schwartz, P. R. Holvorcem | · | 1.6 km | MPC · JPL |
| 755156 | 2017 AY_{21} | — | August 29, 2009 | Kitt Peak | Spacewatch | (32418) | 2.1 km | MPC · JPL |
| 755157 | 2017 AP_{22} | — | November 25, 2011 | Haleakala | Pan-STARRS 1 | · | 1.8 km | MPC · JPL |
| 755158 | 2017 AK_{24} | — | January 8, 2011 | Mount Lemmon | Mount Lemmon Survey | · | 2.4 km | MPC · JPL |
| 755159 | 2017 AQ_{24} | — | November 13, 2015 | Kitt Peak | Spacewatch | · | 2.3 km | MPC · JPL |
| 755160 | 2017 AY_{24} | — | October 26, 2011 | Haleakala | Pan-STARRS 1 | JUN | 830 m | MPC · JPL |
| 755161 | 2017 AV_{25} | — | January 28, 2004 | Catalina | CSS | · | 1.5 km | MPC · JPL |
| 755162 | 2017 AD_{27} | — | January 2, 2017 | Haleakala | Pan-STARRS 1 | GAL | 1.2 km | MPC · JPL |
| 755163 | 2017 AJ_{31} | — | January 4, 2017 | Haleakala | Pan-STARRS 1 | · | 1.6 km | MPC · JPL |
| 755164 | 2017 AC_{32} | — | January 3, 2017 | Haleakala | Pan-STARRS 1 | · | 1.2 km | MPC · JPL |
| 755165 | 2017 AX_{32} | — | January 2, 2017 | Haleakala | Pan-STARRS 1 | · | 1.0 km | MPC · JPL |
| 755166 | 2017 AH_{33} | — | January 4, 2017 | Haleakala | Pan-STARRS 1 | L5 | 6.7 km | MPC · JPL |
| 755167 | 2017 AB_{34} | — | January 4, 2017 | Haleakala | Pan-STARRS 1 | · | 1.5 km | MPC · JPL |
| 755168 | 2017 AC_{34} | — | January 5, 2017 | Mount Lemmon | Mount Lemmon Survey | · | 1.9 km | MPC · JPL |
| 755169 | 2017 AG_{35} | — | January 4, 2017 | Haleakala | Pan-STARRS 1 | L5 | 7.1 km | MPC · JPL |
| 755170 | 2017 AY_{35} | — | January 5, 2017 | Mount Lemmon | Mount Lemmon Survey | · | 750 m | MPC · JPL |
| 755171 | 2017 AN_{38} | — | January 5, 2017 | Mount Lemmon | Mount Lemmon Survey | · | 1.3 km | MPC · JPL |
| 755172 | 2017 AA_{40} | — | January 3, 2017 | Haleakala | Pan-STARRS 1 | BRA | 1.1 km | MPC · JPL |
| 755173 | 2017 AO_{40} | — | January 9, 2017 | Mount Lemmon | Mount Lemmon Survey | · | 980 m | MPC · JPL |
| 755174 | 2017 AP_{42} | — | December 9, 2012 | Haleakala | Pan-STARRS 1 | PHO | 780 m | MPC · JPL |
| 755175 | 2017 AL_{46} | — | March 2, 2008 | Catalina | CSS | · | 1.3 km | MPC · JPL |
| 755176 | 2017 BZ | — | January 3, 2013 | Haleakala | Pan-STARRS 1 | · | 1.3 km | MPC · JPL |
| 755177 | 2017 BK_{1} | — | February 7, 2013 | Catalina | CSS | · | 1.4 km | MPC · JPL |
| 755178 | 2017 BF_{2} | — | September 10, 2007 | Mount Lemmon | Mount Lemmon Survey | · | 1.0 km | MPC · JPL |
| 755179 | 2017 BR_{2} | — | September 20, 2003 | Kitt Peak | Spacewatch | · | 1.1 km | MPC · JPL |
| 755180 | 2017 BY_{2} | — | January 2, 2017 | Haleakala | Pan-STARRS 1 | H | 440 m | MPC · JPL |
| 755181 | 2017 BU_{3} | — | May 23, 2014 | Haleakala | Pan-STARRS 1 | · | 1.6 km | MPC · JPL |
| 755182 | 2017 BE_{7} | — | April 25, 2012 | Haleakala | Pan-STARRS 1 | H | 480 m | MPC · JPL |
| 755183 | 2017 BU_{7} | — | January 28, 2004 | Haleakala | NEAT | H | 500 m | MPC · JPL |
| 755184 | 2017 BZ_{8} | — | November 5, 2016 | Mount Lemmon | Mount Lemmon Survey | · | 1.1 km | MPC · JPL |
| 755185 | 2017 BJ_{9} | — | December 3, 2007 | Kitt Peak | Spacewatch | · | 1.6 km | MPC · JPL |
| 755186 | 2017 BS_{9} | — | February 11, 2013 | Haleakala | Pan-STARRS 1 | · | 1.6 km | MPC · JPL |
| 755187 | 2017 BD_{10} | — | June 27, 2015 | Haleakala | Pan-STARRS 1 | EUN | 930 m | MPC · JPL |
| 755188 | 2017 BS_{10} | — | September 21, 2003 | Kitt Peak | Spacewatch | (5) | 810 m | MPC · JPL |
| 755189 | 2017 BW_{10} | — | February 15, 2013 | Haleakala | Pan-STARRS 1 | · | 1.6 km | MPC · JPL |
| 755190 | 2017 BC_{11} | — | September 8, 2011 | Haleakala | Pan-STARRS 1 | · | 1.3 km | MPC · JPL |
| 755191 | 2017 BD_{11} | — | January 16, 2004 | Kitt Peak | Spacewatch | EUN | 890 m | MPC · JPL |
| 755192 | 2017 BS_{11} | — | February 28, 2008 | Kitt Peak | Spacewatch | · | 1.8 km | MPC · JPL |
| 755193 | 2017 BF_{12} | — | January 31, 2009 | Mount Lemmon | Mount Lemmon Survey | · | 870 m | MPC · JPL |
| 755194 | 2017 BJ_{12} | — | December 16, 2007 | Mount Lemmon | Mount Lemmon Survey | · | 1.7 km | MPC · JPL |
| 755195 | 2017 BQ_{12} | — | February 14, 2013 | Haleakala | Pan-STARRS 1 | · | 1.2 km | MPC · JPL |
| 755196 | 2017 BR_{13} | — | January 11, 2008 | Mount Lemmon | Mount Lemmon Survey | · | 1.6 km | MPC · JPL |
| 755197 | 2017 BT_{13} | — | January 26, 2017 | Mount Lemmon | Mount Lemmon Survey | · | 970 m | MPC · JPL |
| 755198 | 2017 BB_{14} | — | January 11, 2008 | Kitt Peak | Spacewatch | AGN | 960 m | MPC · JPL |
| 755199 | 2017 BL_{14} | — | December 31, 2007 | Mount Lemmon | Mount Lemmon Survey | GAL | 1.4 km | MPC · JPL |
| 755200 | 2017 BM_{15} | — | August 30, 2014 | Mount Lemmon | Mount Lemmon Survey | · | 2.8 km | MPC · JPL |

== 755201–755300 ==
back to top

| Designation | | | Discovery | | | Properties | | Ref |
| Permanent | Provisional | Named after | Date | Site | Discoverer(s) | Category | Diam. | Ref |
|---|---|---|---|---|---|---|---|---|
| 755201 | 2017 BO_{15} | — | November 8, 2008 | Kitt Peak | Spacewatch | · | 930 m | MPC · JPL |
| 755202 | 2017 BE_{16} | — | August 28, 2009 | Kitt Peak | Spacewatch | · | 2.0 km | MPC · JPL |
| 755203 | 2017 BY_{16} | — | July 25, 2015 | Haleakala | Pan-STARRS 1 | EOS | 1.6 km | MPC · JPL |
| 755204 | 2017 BG_{19} | — | September 5, 2010 | Mount Lemmon | Mount Lemmon Survey | · | 1.5 km | MPC · JPL |
| 755205 | 2017 BH_{19} | — | July 28, 2015 | Haleakala | Pan-STARRS 1 | EUN | 910 m | MPC · JPL |
| 755206 | 2017 BS_{20} | — | January 26, 2017 | Mount Lemmon | Mount Lemmon Survey | · | 1.9 km | MPC · JPL |
| 755207 | 2017 BO_{24} | — | November 6, 2007 | XuYi | PMO NEO Survey Program | · | 1.3 km | MPC · JPL |
| 755208 | 2017 BF_{25} | — | November 1, 2006 | Kitt Peak | Spacewatch | AGN | 870 m | MPC · JPL |
| 755209 | 2017 BK_{26} | — | October 18, 2003 | Kitt Peak | Spacewatch | · | 790 m | MPC · JPL |
| 755210 | 2017 BV_{28} | — | December 29, 2011 | Mount Lemmon | Mount Lemmon Survey | · | 1.9 km | MPC · JPL |
| 755211 | 2017 BM_{33} | — | January 20, 2013 | Kitt Peak | Spacewatch | · | 1.1 km | MPC · JPL |
| 755212 | 2017 BR_{34} | — | March 17, 2013 | Palomar | Palomar Transient Factory | (1547) | 1.2 km | MPC · JPL |
| 755213 | 2017 BG_{35} | — | January 31, 2003 | Socorro | LINEAR | · | 2.0 km | MPC · JPL |
| 755214 | 2017 BU_{36} | — | January 20, 2013 | Kitt Peak | Spacewatch | · | 1.1 km | MPC · JPL |
| 755215 | 2017 BA_{38} | — | September 17, 2010 | Mount Lemmon | Mount Lemmon Survey | H | 460 m | MPC · JPL |
| 755216 | 2017 BV_{40} | — | June 27, 2011 | Mount Lemmon | Mount Lemmon Survey | · | 1.6 km | MPC · JPL |
| 755217 | 2017 BK_{42} | — | December 25, 2011 | Mount Lemmon | Mount Lemmon Survey | · | 1.5 km | MPC · JPL |
| 755218 | 2017 BN_{43} | — | December 31, 2007 | Mount Lemmon | Mount Lemmon Survey | · | 1.7 km | MPC · JPL |
| 755219 | 2017 BF_{45} | — | December 28, 2005 | Mount Lemmon | Mount Lemmon Survey | H | 500 m | MPC · JPL |
| 755220 | 2017 BR_{46} | — | July 25, 2014 | Haleakala | Pan-STARRS 1 | · | 2.5 km | MPC · JPL |
| 755221 | 2017 BY_{46} | — | April 9, 2013 | Haleakala | Pan-STARRS 1 | · | 1.5 km | MPC · JPL |
| 755222 | 2017 BL_{47} | — | February 3, 2012 | Mount Lemmon | Mount Lemmon Survey | · | 1.7 km | MPC · JPL |
| 755223 | 2017 BV_{48} | — | January 27, 2007 | Kitt Peak | Spacewatch | · | 1.4 km | MPC · JPL |
| 755224 | 2017 BV_{49} | — | October 31, 2008 | Mount Lemmon | Mount Lemmon Survey | · | 1.1 km | MPC · JPL |
| 755225 | 2017 BT_{50} | — | November 10, 2016 | Haleakala | Pan-STARRS 1 | · | 1.1 km | MPC · JPL |
| 755226 | 2017 BA_{51} | — | January 9, 2017 | Mount Lemmon | Mount Lemmon Survey | L5 | 8.1 km | MPC · JPL |
| 755227 | 2017 BL_{52} | — | June 26, 2015 | Haleakala | Pan-STARRS 1 | · | 1.6 km | MPC · JPL |
| 755228 | 2017 BM_{54} | — | September 11, 2015 | Haleakala | Pan-STARRS 1 | · | 880 m | MPC · JPL |
| 755229 | 2017 BY_{55} | — | October 26, 2011 | Haleakala | Pan-STARRS 1 | · | 1.4 km | MPC · JPL |
| 755230 | 2017 BP_{56} | — | December 31, 2007 | Kitt Peak | Spacewatch | · | 1.2 km | MPC · JPL |
| 755231 | 2017 BL_{58} | — | February 19, 2013 | Kitt Peak | Spacewatch | · | 1.3 km | MPC · JPL |
| 755232 | 2017 BW_{58} | — | October 27, 2011 | Mount Lemmon | Mount Lemmon Survey | · | 1.3 km | MPC · JPL |
| 755233 | 2017 BD_{61} | — | September 24, 2011 | Haleakala | Pan-STARRS 1 | · | 1.4 km | MPC · JPL |
| 755234 | 2017 BQ_{62} | — | February 5, 2013 | Catalina | CSS | · | 1.4 km | MPC · JPL |
| 755235 | 2017 BK_{64} | — | October 13, 2007 | Mount Lemmon | Mount Lemmon Survey | · | 1.0 km | MPC · JPL |
| 755236 | 2017 BX_{64} | — | May 28, 2014 | Haleakala | Pan-STARRS 1 | · | 1.3 km | MPC · JPL |
| 755237 | 2017 BE_{66} | — | November 28, 2011 | Kitt Peak | Spacewatch | · | 2.1 km | MPC · JPL |
| 755238 | 2017 BN_{66} | — | December 23, 2016 | Haleakala | Pan-STARRS 1 | · | 1.9 km | MPC · JPL |
| 755239 | 2017 BR_{68} | — | December 5, 2007 | Kitt Peak | Spacewatch | · | 1.5 km | MPC · JPL |
| 755240 | 2017 BP_{70} | — | December 23, 2012 | Haleakala | Pan-STARRS 1 | · | 1.2 km | MPC · JPL |
| 755241 | 2017 BG_{71} | — | January 26, 2017 | Mount Lemmon | Mount Lemmon Survey | · | 1.9 km | MPC · JPL |
| 755242 | 2017 BN_{71} | — | February 11, 2014 | Mount Lemmon | Mount Lemmon Survey | · | 790 m | MPC · JPL |
| 755243 | 2017 BE_{74} | — | January 27, 2017 | Haleakala | Pan-STARRS 1 | · | 910 m | MPC · JPL |
| 755244 | 2017 BS_{78} | — | August 28, 2014 | Haleakala | Pan-STARRS 1 | · | 3.5 km | MPC · JPL |
| 755245 | 2017 BC_{79} | — | November 22, 2005 | Kitt Peak | Spacewatch | · | 1.2 km | MPC · JPL |
| 755246 | 2017 BT_{79} | — | December 4, 2007 | Kitt Peak | Spacewatch | · | 1.2 km | MPC · JPL |
| 755247 | 2017 BW_{80} | — | November 19, 2007 | Mount Lemmon | Mount Lemmon Survey | · | 1.3 km | MPC · JPL |
| 755248 | 2017 BO_{81} | — | September 4, 2011 | Haleakala | Pan-STARRS 1 | · | 660 m | MPC · JPL |
| 755249 | 2017 BV_{83} | — | August 12, 2015 | Haleakala | Pan-STARRS 1 | · | 1.7 km | MPC · JPL |
| 755250 | 2017 BU_{85} | — | July 24, 2015 | Haleakala | Pan-STARRS 1 | · | 1.2 km | MPC · JPL |
| 755251 | 2017 BB_{86} | — | February 25, 2012 | Mount Lemmon | Mount Lemmon Survey | EOS | 1.7 km | MPC · JPL |
| 755252 | 2017 BV_{86} | — | January 2, 2017 | Haleakala | Pan-STARRS 1 | · | 1.5 km | MPC · JPL |
| 755253 | 2017 BH_{91} | — | September 27, 2003 | Kitt Peak | Spacewatch | · | 1.5 km | MPC · JPL |
| 755254 | 2017 BK_{91} | — | April 15, 2004 | Apache Point | SDSS | H | 490 m | MPC · JPL |
| 755255 | 2017 BX_{93} | — | December 6, 2005 | Kitt Peak | Spacewatch | H | 590 m | MPC · JPL |
| 755256 | 2017 BW_{94} | — | January 28, 2011 | Mount Lemmon | Mount Lemmon Survey | ELF | 2.7 km | MPC · JPL |
| 755257 | 2017 BH_{95} | — | October 8, 2007 | Mount Lemmon | Mount Lemmon Survey | · | 980 m | MPC · JPL |
| 755258 | 2017 BN_{95} | — | October 10, 2007 | Mount Lemmon | Mount Lemmon Survey | ADE | 1.3 km | MPC · JPL |
| 755259 | 2017 BS_{95} | — | October 18, 2015 | Haleakala | Pan-STARRS 1 | (12739) | 1.1 km | MPC · JPL |
| 755260 | 2017 BY_{95} | — | October 24, 2011 | Haleakala | Pan-STARRS 1 | · | 990 m | MPC · JPL |
| 755261 | 2017 BB_{96} | — | December 3, 2008 | Mount Lemmon | Mount Lemmon Survey | · | 1.1 km | MPC · JPL |
| 755262 | 2017 BG_{97} | — | January 15, 2013 | Tenerife | ESA OGS | · | 1.1 km | MPC · JPL |
| 755263 | 2017 BV_{97} | — | August 30, 2011 | Haleakala | Pan-STARRS 1 | KON | 2.2 km | MPC · JPL |
| 755264 | 2017 BC_{100} | — | March 12, 2013 | Mount Lemmon | Mount Lemmon Survey | · | 1.3 km | MPC · JPL |
| 755265 | 2017 BT_{101} | — | March 3, 2009 | Mount Lemmon | Mount Lemmon Survey | · | 880 m | MPC · JPL |
| 755266 | 2017 BA_{103} | — | January 29, 2017 | Mount Lemmon | Mount Lemmon Survey | · | 1.8 km | MPC · JPL |
| 755267 | 2017 BO_{103} | — | June 2, 2014 | Mount Lemmon | Mount Lemmon Survey | · | 1.5 km | MPC · JPL |
| 755268 | 2017 BQ_{103} | — | June 28, 2014 | Haleakala | Pan-STARRS 1 | GAL | 1.7 km | MPC · JPL |
| 755269 | 2017 BF_{104} | — | January 3, 2017 | Haleakala | Pan-STARRS 1 | · | 970 m | MPC · JPL |
| 755270 | 2017 BG_{104} | — | January 29, 2017 | Mount Lemmon | Mount Lemmon Survey | · | 1.8 km | MPC · JPL |
| 755271 | 2017 BS_{104} | — | February 12, 2008 | Mount Lemmon | Mount Lemmon Survey | DOR | 1.8 km | MPC · JPL |
| 755272 | 2017 BS_{106} | — | October 12, 2015 | Haleakala | Pan-STARRS 1 | · | 1.1 km | MPC · JPL |
| 755273 | 2017 BL_{107} | — | October 10, 2015 | Haleakala | Pan-STARRS 1 | · | 2.8 km | MPC · JPL |
| 755274 | 2017 BN_{107} | — | October 2, 2015 | Mount Lemmon | Mount Lemmon Survey | MAR | 820 m | MPC · JPL |
| 755275 | 2017 BQ_{107} | — | January 21, 2013 | Mount Lemmon | Mount Lemmon Survey | HNS | 970 m | MPC · JPL |
| 755276 | 2017 BT_{107} | — | November 18, 2007 | Mount Lemmon | Mount Lemmon Survey | · | 1.2 km | MPC · JPL |
| 755277 | 2017 BK_{109} | — | June 15, 2015 | Haleakala | Pan-STARRS 1 | H | 410 m | MPC · JPL |
| 755278 | 2017 BW_{109} | — | June 29, 2011 | Kitt Peak | Spacewatch | L5 | 7.7 km | MPC · JPL |
| 755279 | 2017 BH_{110} | — | October 15, 2015 | Haleakala | Pan-STARRS 1 | · | 1.5 km | MPC · JPL |
| 755280 | 2017 BW_{111} | — | August 28, 2011 | Siding Spring | SSS | · | 1.6 km | MPC · JPL |
| 755281 | 2017 BY_{111} | — | June 13, 2015 | Haleakala | Pan-STARRS 1 | · | 1.5 km | MPC · JPL |
| 755282 | 2017 BF_{112} | — | September 22, 2003 | Kitt Peak | Spacewatch | · | 990 m | MPC · JPL |
| 755283 | 2017 BB_{113} | — | February 22, 2004 | Kitt Peak | Spacewatch | · | 1.4 km | MPC · JPL |
| 755284 | 2017 BA_{114} | — | July 27, 2015 | Haleakala | Pan-STARRS 1 | JUN | 970 m | MPC · JPL |
| 755285 | 2017 BJ_{114} | — | December 22, 2016 | Haleakala | Pan-STARRS 1 | · | 1.0 km | MPC · JPL |
| 755286 | 2017 BZ_{114} | — | October 31, 2005 | Mount Lemmon | Mount Lemmon Survey | · | 1.3 km | MPC · JPL |
| 755287 | 2017 BZ_{117} | — | October 24, 2011 | Kitt Peak | Spacewatch | ADE | 1.7 km | MPC · JPL |
| 755288 | 2017 BC_{119} | — | November 1, 2015 | Mount Lemmon | Mount Lemmon Survey | HNS | 920 m | MPC · JPL |
| 755289 | 2017 BD_{122} | — | November 28, 2011 | Mount Lemmon | Mount Lemmon Survey | · | 1.7 km | MPC · JPL |
| 755290 | 2017 BM_{124} | — | April 19, 2007 | Anderson Mesa | LONEOS | · | 1.8 km | MPC · JPL |
| 755291 | 2017 BR_{124} | — | March 25, 2010 | Kitt Peak | Spacewatch | · | 1.2 km | MPC · JPL |
| 755292 | 2017 BW_{126} | — | March 4, 2013 | Haleakala | Pan-STARRS 1 | · | 1.2 km | MPC · JPL |
| 755293 | 2017 BW_{128} | — | February 14, 2013 | Haleakala | Pan-STARRS 1 | HNS | 1.0 km | MPC · JPL |
| 755294 | 2017 BE_{129} | — | July 8, 2005 | Kitt Peak | Spacewatch | · | 1.7 km | MPC · JPL |
| 755295 | 2017 BK_{130} | — | August 27, 2013 | Haleakala | Pan-STARRS 1 | · | 2.4 km | MPC · JPL |
| 755296 | 2017 BG_{133} | — | August 21, 2015 | Haleakala | Pan-STARRS 1 | · | 1.6 km | MPC · JPL |
| 755297 | 2017 BF_{134} | — | August 27, 2011 | Haleakala | Pan-STARRS 1 | · | 1 km | MPC · JPL |
| 755298 | 2017 BR_{134} | — | January 4, 2017 | Mount Lemmon | Mount Lemmon Survey | · | 1.6 km | MPC · JPL |
| 755299 | 2017 BJ_{135} | — | May 15, 2013 | Haleakala | Pan-STARRS 1 | EOS | 1.3 km | MPC · JPL |
| 755300 | 2017 BP_{135} | — | August 20, 2014 | Haleakala | Pan-STARRS 1 | · | 1.7 km | MPC · JPL |

== 755301–755400 ==
back to top

| Designation | | | Discovery | | | Properties | | Ref |
| Permanent | Provisional | Named after | Date | Site | Discoverer(s) | Category | Diam. | Ref |
|---|---|---|---|---|---|---|---|---|
| 755301 | 2017 BD_{136} | — | January 19, 2012 | Catalina | CSS | T_{j} (2.92) | 3.1 km | MPC · JPL |
| 755302 | 2017 BV_{136} | — | September 15, 2006 | Kitt Peak | Spacewatch | EUN | 940 m | MPC · JPL |
| 755303 | 2017 BN_{137} | — | January 29, 2009 | Mount Lemmon | Mount Lemmon Survey | · | 980 m | MPC · JPL |
| 755304 | 2017 BK_{139} | — | August 4, 2014 | Haleakala | Pan-STARRS 1 | · | 1.3 km | MPC · JPL |
| 755305 | 2017 BW_{139} | — | February 14, 2013 | Mount Lemmon | Mount Lemmon Survey | · | 1.1 km | MPC · JPL |
| 755306 | 2017 BD_{140} | — | January 19, 2012 | Kitt Peak | Spacewatch | · | 1.5 km | MPC · JPL |
| 755307 | 2017 BZ_{140} | — | November 24, 2006 | Kitt Peak | Spacewatch | · | 1.8 km | MPC · JPL |
| 755308 | 2017 BN_{141} | — | November 10, 2010 | Mount Lemmon | Mount Lemmon Survey | · | 1.7 km | MPC · JPL |
| 755309 | 2017 BQ_{142} | — | January 12, 2011 | Mount Lemmon | Mount Lemmon Survey | · | 2.4 km | MPC · JPL |
| 755310 | 2017 BN_{157} | — | January 29, 2017 | Haleakala | Pan-STARRS 1 | · | 1.1 km | MPC · JPL |
| 755311 | 2017 BV_{157} | — | January 31, 2017 | Haleakala | Pan-STARRS 1 | H | 400 m | MPC · JPL |
| 755312 | 2017 BA_{158} | — | January 30, 2017 | Haleakala | Pan-STARRS 1 | · | 1.3 km | MPC · JPL |
| 755313 | 2017 BP_{159} | — | January 31, 2017 | Haleakala | Pan-STARRS 1 | L5 | 8.6 km | MPC · JPL |
| 755314 | 2017 BF_{161} | — | January 28, 2017 | Haleakala | Pan-STARRS 1 | · | 890 m | MPC · JPL |
| 755315 | 2017 BC_{162} | — | January 28, 2017 | Haleakala | Pan-STARRS 1 | L5 | 7.9 km | MPC · JPL |
| 755316 | 2017 BR_{163} | — | January 26, 2017 | Haleakala | Pan-STARRS 1 | (1547) | 960 m | MPC · JPL |
| 755317 | 2017 BQ_{166} | — | January 20, 2017 | Haleakala | Pan-STARRS 1 | · | 1.6 km | MPC · JPL |
| 755318 | 2017 BM_{168} | — | January 28, 2017 | Haleakala | Pan-STARRS 1 | MRX | 900 m | MPC · JPL |
| 755319 | 2017 BR_{170} | — | January 31, 2017 | Haleakala | Pan-STARRS 1 | · | 1.3 km | MPC · JPL |
| 755320 | 2017 BQ_{173} | — | October 7, 2008 | Mount Lemmon | Mount Lemmon Survey | · | 870 m | MPC · JPL |
| 755321 | 2017 BH_{175} | — | January 28, 2017 | Haleakala | Pan-STARRS 1 | L5 | 7.0 km | MPC · JPL |
| 755322 | 2017 BT_{175} | — | January 20, 2017 | Haleakala | Pan-STARRS 1 | L5 | 6.8 km | MPC · JPL |
| 755323 | 2017 BS_{182} | — | January 28, 2017 | Haleakala | Pan-STARRS 1 | · | 1.1 km | MPC · JPL |
| 755324 | 2017 BB_{184} | — | July 27, 2011 | Haleakala | Pan-STARRS 1 | L5 | 7.5 km | MPC · JPL |
| 755325 | 2017 BB_{185} | — | January 20, 2017 | Haleakala | Pan-STARRS 1 | L5 | 6.5 km | MPC · JPL |
| 755326 | 2017 BK_{190} | — | January 28, 2017 | Haleakala | Pan-STARRS 1 | THM | 1.7 km | MPC · JPL |
| 755327 | 2017 BJ_{220} | — | October 24, 2005 | Mauna Kea | A. Boattini | L5 | 8.6 km | MPC · JPL |
| 755328 | 2017 BE_{231} | — | October 14, 2009 | Mount Lemmon | Mount Lemmon Survey | · | 1.7 km | MPC · JPL |
| 755329 | 2017 CD_{3} | — | September 18, 2003 | Kitt Peak | Spacewatch | · | 980 m | MPC · JPL |
| 755330 | 2017 CX_{4} | — | May 7, 2014 | Haleakala | Pan-STARRS 1 | · | 1.0 km | MPC · JPL |
| 755331 | 2017 CY_{4} | — | December 30, 2007 | Mount Lemmon | Mount Lemmon Survey | · | 1.4 km | MPC · JPL |
| 755332 | 2017 CF_{5} | — | January 28, 2017 | Mount Lemmon | Mount Lemmon Survey | H | 440 m | MPC · JPL |
| 755333 | 2017 CQ_{7} | — | September 24, 2011 | Haleakala | Pan-STARRS 1 | · | 980 m | MPC · JPL |
| 755334 | 2017 CS_{8} | — | September 25, 2007 | Mount Lemmon | Mount Lemmon Survey | · | 910 m | MPC · JPL |
| 755335 | 2017 CB_{9} | — | April 13, 2013 | Kitt Peak | Spacewatch | · | 1.6 km | MPC · JPL |
| 755336 | 2017 CM_{9} | — | February 3, 2012 | Haleakala | Pan-STARRS 1 | · | 2.0 km | MPC · JPL |
| 755337 | 2017 CA_{10} | — | February 10, 2008 | Mount Lemmon | Mount Lemmon Survey | · | 2.3 km | MPC · JPL |
| 755338 | 2017 CN_{10} | — | September 20, 2006 | Kitt Peak | Spacewatch | · | 1.3 km | MPC · JPL |
| 755339 | 2017 CP_{11} | — | January 2, 2008 | Zelenchukskaya | T. V. Krjačko | · | 1.2 km | MPC · JPL |
| 755340 | 2017 CB_{12} | — | June 23, 2014 | Mount Lemmon | Mount Lemmon Survey | · | 3.1 km | MPC · JPL |
| 755341 | 2017 CH_{12} | — | December 15, 2010 | Mount Lemmon | Mount Lemmon Survey | · | 2.5 km | MPC · JPL |
| 755342 | 2017 CJ_{12} | — | September 3, 2010 | Mount Lemmon | Mount Lemmon Survey | HNS | 940 m | MPC · JPL |
| 755343 | 2017 CX_{12} | — | August 21, 2014 | Haleakala | Pan-STARRS 1 | · | 2.0 km | MPC · JPL |
| 755344 | 2017 CY_{12} | — | October 13, 2010 | Mount Lemmon | Mount Lemmon Survey | · | 1.5 km | MPC · JPL |
| 755345 | 2017 CE_{29} | — | August 3, 2014 | Haleakala | Pan-STARRS 1 | · | 1.5 km | MPC · JPL |
| 755346 | 2017 CG_{29} | — | March 10, 2008 | Mount Lemmon | Mount Lemmon Survey | MRX | 850 m | MPC · JPL |
| 755347 | 2017 CQ_{29} | — | July 28, 2011 | Haleakala | Pan-STARRS 1 | · | 890 m | MPC · JPL |
| 755348 | 2017 CR_{29} | — | December 30, 2011 | Mount Lemmon | Mount Lemmon Survey | · | 2.3 km | MPC · JPL |
| 755349 | 2017 CL_{31} | — | February 7, 2006 | Mount Lemmon | Mount Lemmon Survey | H | 510 m | MPC · JPL |
| 755350 | 2017 CP_{33} | — | February 23, 2004 | Socorro | LINEAR | HNS | 1.1 km | MPC · JPL |
| 755351 | 2017 CC_{35} | — | October 1, 2014 | Haleakala | Pan-STARRS 1 | · | 2.4 km | MPC · JPL |
| 755352 | 2017 CH_{35} | — | October 14, 2014 | Mount Lemmon | Mount Lemmon Survey | · | 2.0 km | MPC · JPL |
| 755353 | 2017 CK_{35} | — | April 21, 2012 | Haleakala | Pan-STARRS 1 | TIR | 2.5 km | MPC · JPL |
| 755354 | 2017 CS_{35} | — | October 1, 2013 | Kitt Peak | Spacewatch | · | 2.2 km | MPC · JPL |
| 755355 | 2017 CE_{37} | — | February 4, 2017 | Haleakala | Pan-STARRS 1 | · | 2.4 km | MPC · JPL |
| 755356 | 2017 CN_{38} | — | February 2, 2017 | Haleakala | Pan-STARRS 1 | H | 410 m | MPC · JPL |
| 755357 | 2017 CY_{39} | — | February 2, 2017 | Haleakala | Pan-STARRS 1 | TIR | 2.2 km | MPC · JPL |
| 755358 | 2017 CZ_{39} | — | February 2, 2017 | Haleakala | Pan-STARRS 1 | · | 1.5 km | MPC · JPL |
| 755359 | 2017 CD_{40} | — | February 1, 2017 | Mount Lemmon | Mount Lemmon Survey | · | 1.6 km | MPC · JPL |
| 755360 | 2017 CP_{40} | — | February 1, 2017 | Mount Lemmon | Mount Lemmon Survey | L5 | 8.5 km | MPC · JPL |
| 755361 | 2017 CY_{40} | — | February 2, 2017 | Haleakala | Pan-STARRS 1 | L5 | 7.6 km | MPC · JPL |
| 755362 | 2017 CJ_{41} | — | February 4, 2017 | Mount Lemmon | Mount Lemmon Survey | · | 1.1 km | MPC · JPL |
| 755363 | 2017 CJ_{47} | — | February 2, 2017 | Haleakala | Pan-STARRS 1 | · | 2.1 km | MPC · JPL |
| 755364 | 2017 DK | — | January 30, 2009 | Kitt Peak | Spacewatch | H | 480 m | MPC · JPL |
| 755365 | 2017 DE_{2} | — | October 11, 2015 | Mount Lemmon | Mount Lemmon Survey | EOS | 1.4 km | MPC · JPL |
| 755366 | 2017 DQ_{8} | — | January 16, 2008 | Kitt Peak | Spacewatch | HNS | 920 m | MPC · JPL |
| 755367 | 2017 DQ_{10} | — | March 6, 2013 | Haleakala | Pan-STARRS 1 | · | 1.1 km | MPC · JPL |
| 755368 | 2017 DS_{10} | — | August 12, 2007 | Bergisch Gladbach | W. Bickel | · | 940 m | MPC · JPL |
| 755369 | 2017 DW_{10} | — | September 4, 2011 | Haleakala | Pan-STARRS 1 | · | 1.0 km | MPC · JPL |
| 755370 | 2017 DU_{12} | — | January 4, 2017 | Mount Lemmon | Mount Lemmon Survey | BRG | 1.1 km | MPC · JPL |
| 755371 | 2017 DY_{12} | — | July 19, 2015 | Haleakala | Pan-STARRS 1 | EUN | 1.0 km | MPC · JPL |
| 755372 | 2017 DV_{13} | — | September 10, 2007 | Mount Lemmon | Mount Lemmon Survey | · | 990 m | MPC · JPL |
| 755373 | 2017 DP_{14} | — | April 22, 2009 | Mount Lemmon | Mount Lemmon Survey | · | 1.0 km | MPC · JPL |
| 755374 | 2017 DA_{15} | — | December 3, 2005 | Mauna Kea | A. Boattini | · | 2.9 km | MPC · JPL |
| 755375 | 2017 DL_{16} | — | December 22, 2016 | Haleakala | Pan-STARRS 1 | H | 470 m | MPC · JPL |
| 755376 | 2017 DG_{22} | — | January 25, 2006 | Kitt Peak | Spacewatch | · | 2.1 km | MPC · JPL |
| 755377 | 2017 DC_{24} | — | August 14, 2010 | Kitt Peak | Spacewatch | · | 1.7 km | MPC · JPL |
| 755378 | 2017 DF_{27} | — | November 26, 2005 | Mount Lemmon | Mount Lemmon Survey | · | 1.3 km | MPC · JPL |
| 755379 | 2017 DS_{27} | — | February 7, 2008 | Mount Lemmon | Mount Lemmon Survey | · | 1.4 km | MPC · JPL |
| 755380 | 2017 DV_{29} | — | December 23, 2012 | Haleakala | Pan-STARRS 1 | · | 1.2 km | MPC · JPL |
| 755381 | 2017 DT_{30} | — | March 5, 2013 | Haleakala | Pan-STARRS 1 | · | 1.2 km | MPC · JPL |
| 755382 | 2017 DH_{32} | — | July 28, 2014 | Haleakala | Pan-STARRS 1 | WAT | 1.4 km | MPC · JPL |
| 755383 | 2017 DQ_{33} | — | July 25, 2014 | Haleakala | Pan-STARRS 1 | · | 1.7 km | MPC · JPL |
| 755384 | 2017 DB_{34} | — | January 1, 2009 | Kitt Peak | Spacewatch | H | 520 m | MPC · JPL |
| 755385 | 2017 DD_{34} | — | March 15, 2012 | Catalina | CSS | H | 510 m | MPC · JPL |
| 755386 | 2017 DA_{35} | — | February 21, 2017 | Mount Lemmon | Mount Lemmon Survey | H | 400 m | MPC · JPL |
| 755387 | 2017 DN_{36} | — | February 1, 2009 | Kitt Peak | Spacewatch | H | 450 m | MPC · JPL |
| 755388 | 2017 DJ_{37} | — | December 24, 2005 | Kitt Peak | Spacewatch | H | 530 m | MPC · JPL |
| 755389 | 2017 DX_{39} | — | October 12, 2006 | Kitt Peak | Spacewatch | · | 1.1 km | MPC · JPL |
| 755390 | 2017 DZ_{39} | — | October 15, 2004 | Mount Lemmon | Mount Lemmon Survey | MAS | 540 m | MPC · JPL |
| 755391 | 2017 DA_{42} | — | June 7, 2013 | Haleakala | Pan-STARRS 1 | · | 1.5 km | MPC · JPL |
| 755392 | 2017 DK_{44} | — | October 26, 2011 | Haleakala | Pan-STARRS 1 | · | 1.1 km | MPC · JPL |
| 755393 | 2017 DH_{45} | — | January 20, 2006 | Kitt Peak | Spacewatch | · | 2.3 km | MPC · JPL |
| 755394 | 2017 DW_{46} | — | September 9, 2015 | Haleakala | Pan-STARRS 1 | · | 1.5 km | MPC · JPL |
| 755395 | 2017 DH_{47} | — | February 14, 2013 | Haleakala | Pan-STARRS 1 | · | 940 m | MPC · JPL |
| 755396 | 2017 DA_{48} | — | September 12, 2015 | Haleakala | Pan-STARRS 1 | HNS | 1.0 km | MPC · JPL |
| 755397 | 2017 DM_{48} | — | February 25, 2007 | Mount Lemmon | Mount Lemmon Survey | · | 1.5 km | MPC · JPL |
| 755398 | 2017 DW_{51} | — | March 4, 2006 | Mount Lemmon | Mount Lemmon Survey | · | 2.9 km | MPC · JPL |
| 755399 | 2017 DO_{52} | — | June 11, 2011 | Mount Lemmon | Mount Lemmon Survey | L5 | 8.4 km | MPC · JPL |
| 755400 | 2017 DS_{55} | — | September 23, 2008 | Mount Lemmon | Mount Lemmon Survey | EUP | 3.7 km | MPC · JPL |

== 755401–755500 ==
back to top

| Designation | | | Discovery | | | Properties | | Ref |
| Permanent | Provisional | Named after | Date | Site | Discoverer(s) | Category | Diam. | Ref |
|---|---|---|---|---|---|---|---|---|
| 755401 | 2017 DO_{56} | — | February 21, 2017 | Mount Lemmon | Mount Lemmon Survey | · | 1.0 km | MPC · JPL |
| 755402 | 2017 DS_{58} | — | March 31, 2008 | Mount Lemmon | Mount Lemmon Survey | BRA | 1.4 km | MPC · JPL |
| 755403 | 2017 DE_{60} | — | December 6, 2011 | Haleakala | Pan-STARRS 1 | · | 1.4 km | MPC · JPL |
| 755404 | 2017 DU_{60} | — | May 14, 2008 | Mount Lemmon | Mount Lemmon Survey | · | 1.8 km | MPC · JPL |
| 755405 | 2017 DE_{65} | — | January 31, 2017 | Mount Lemmon | Mount Lemmon Survey | · | 1.4 km | MPC · JPL |
| 755406 | 2017 DJ_{66} | — | September 6, 2015 | Haleakala | Pan-STARRS 1 | EUN | 970 m | MPC · JPL |
| 755407 | 2017 DX_{66} | — | November 30, 2011 | Mayhill-ISON | L. Elenin | · | 1.3 km | MPC · JPL |
| 755408 | 2017 DC_{68} | — | February 2, 2008 | Mount Lemmon | Mount Lemmon Survey | · | 1.6 km | MPC · JPL |
| 755409 | 2017 DC_{72} | — | February 21, 2017 | Haleakala | Pan-STARRS 1 | · | 560 m | MPC · JPL |
| 755410 | 2017 DA_{73} | — | March 11, 2002 | Cima Ekar | ADAS | · | 900 m | MPC · JPL |
| 755411 | 2017 DM_{75} | — | January 21, 2006 | Kitt Peak | Spacewatch | · | 1.7 km | MPC · JPL |
| 755412 | 2017 DZ_{75} | — | January 16, 2011 | Mount Lemmon | Mount Lemmon Survey | · | 2.3 km | MPC · JPL |
| 755413 | 2017 DM_{77} | — | April 10, 2005 | Mount Lemmon | Mount Lemmon Survey | · | 920 m | MPC · JPL |
| 755414 | 2017 DQ_{77} | — | December 2, 2016 | Mount Lemmon | Mount Lemmon Survey | · | 1.3 km | MPC · JPL |
| 755415 | 2017 DD_{78} | — | February 14, 2013 | Haleakala | Pan-STARRS 1 | KON | 2.1 km | MPC · JPL |
| 755416 | 2017 DS_{78} | — | February 1, 2017 | Mount Lemmon | Mount Lemmon Survey | T_{j} (2.94) | 3.6 km | MPC · JPL |
| 755417 | 2017 DW_{78} | — | March 16, 2013 | Catalina | CSS | · | 1.5 km | MPC · JPL |
| 755418 | 2017 DD_{79} | — | October 8, 2012 | Mount Lemmon | Mount Lemmon Survey | · | 500 m | MPC · JPL |
| 755419 | 2017 DR_{80} | — | January 2, 2012 | Kitt Peak | Spacewatch | · | 1.7 km | MPC · JPL |
| 755420 | 2017 DE_{81} | — | January 21, 2013 | Haleakala | Pan-STARRS 1 | · | 1.2 km | MPC · JPL |
| 755421 | 2017 DL_{81} | — | February 8, 2008 | Kitt Peak | Spacewatch | · | 1.7 km | MPC · JPL |
| 755422 | 2017 DO_{81} | — | January 3, 2017 | Haleakala | Pan-STARRS 1 | · | 1.4 km | MPC · JPL |
| 755423 | 2017 DG_{82} | — | November 22, 2011 | Mount Lemmon | Mount Lemmon Survey | · | 1.4 km | MPC · JPL |
| 755424 | 2017 DJ_{82} | — | April 15, 2012 | Haleakala | Pan-STARRS 1 | · | 2.6 km | MPC · JPL |
| 755425 | 2017 DL_{82} | — | February 16, 2004 | Socorro | LINEAR | · | 1.5 km | MPC · JPL |
| 755426 | 2017 DF_{83} | — | September 14, 2010 | Kitt Peak | Spacewatch | · | 2.1 km | MPC · JPL |
| 755427 | 2017 DA_{84} | — | January 2, 2017 | Haleakala | Pan-STARRS 1 | · | 1.3 km | MPC · JPL |
| 755428 | 2017 DD_{84} | — | March 14, 2012 | Haleakala | Pan-STARRS 1 | H | 440 m | MPC · JPL |
| 755429 | 2017 DT_{84} | — | October 2, 2015 | Mount Lemmon | Mount Lemmon Survey | · | 1.4 km | MPC · JPL |
| 755430 | 2017 DT_{86} | — | February 14, 2013 | Kitt Peak | Spacewatch | MAR | 1.0 km | MPC · JPL |
| 755431 | 2017 DS_{88} | — | March 1, 2011 | Needville | J. Dellinger | · | 3.1 km | MPC · JPL |
| 755432 | 2017 DM_{89} | — | September 28, 2006 | Catalina | CSS | · | 2.0 km | MPC · JPL |
| 755433 | 2017 DT_{90} | — | December 29, 2005 | Kitt Peak | Spacewatch | · | 1.6 km | MPC · JPL |
| 755434 | 2017 DM_{91} | — | October 25, 2011 | Haleakala | Pan-STARRS 1 | · | 1.2 km | MPC · JPL |
| 755435 | 2017 DE_{92} | — | November 24, 2011 | Mount Lemmon | Mount Lemmon Survey | · | 1.1 km | MPC · JPL |
| 755436 | 2017 DG_{92} | — | September 13, 2014 | Haleakala | Pan-STARRS 1 | · | 1.7 km | MPC · JPL |
| 755437 | 2017 DJ_{97} | — | February 4, 2006 | Kitt Peak | Spacewatch | EOS | 1.4 km | MPC · JPL |
| 755438 | 2017 DZ_{99} | — | January 13, 2008 | Kitt Peak | Spacewatch | · | 1.1 km | MPC · JPL |
| 755439 | 2017 DO_{100} | — | January 23, 2011 | Mount Lemmon | Mount Lemmon Survey | · | 2.5 km | MPC · JPL |
| 755440 | 2017 DZ_{100} | — | December 14, 2010 | Westfield | R. Holmes | LIX | 3.3 km | MPC · JPL |
| 755441 | 2017 DY_{101} | — | April 2, 2006 | Kitt Peak | Spacewatch | · | 2.3 km | MPC · JPL |
| 755442 | 2017 DB_{102} | — | December 8, 2015 | Haleakala | Pan-STARRS 1 | · | 2.6 km | MPC · JPL |
| 755443 | 2017 DK_{103} | — | December 31, 2011 | Kitt Peak | Spacewatch | · | 1.7 km | MPC · JPL |
| 755444 | 2017 DM_{103} | — | September 10, 2015 | Haleakala | Pan-STARRS 1 | · | 1.2 km | MPC · JPL |
| 755445 | 2017 DT_{103} | — | March 16, 2007 | Mount Lemmon | Mount Lemmon Survey | · | 680 m | MPC · JPL |
| 755446 | 2017 DW_{103} | — | February 22, 2017 | Haleakala | Pan-STARRS 1 | T_{j} (2.98) | 2.5 km | MPC · JPL |
| 755447 | 2017 DN_{104} | — | April 10, 2013 | Mount Lemmon | Mount Lemmon Survey | HNS | 960 m | MPC · JPL |
| 755448 | 2017 DS_{104} | — | January 26, 2017 | Mount Lemmon | Mount Lemmon Survey | · | 1.5 km | MPC · JPL |
| 755449 | 2017 DH_{105} | — | September 9, 2015 | Haleakala | Pan-STARRS 1 | · | 1.3 km | MPC · JPL |
| 755450 | 2017 DW_{105} | — | February 24, 2012 | Kitt Peak | Spacewatch | EOS | 2.0 km | MPC · JPL |
| 755451 | 2017 DE_{106} | — | January 25, 2011 | Mount Lemmon | Mount Lemmon Survey | · | 2.7 km | MPC · JPL |
| 755452 | 2017 DH_{106} | — | January 13, 2011 | Mount Lemmon | Mount Lemmon Survey | · | 2.4 km | MPC · JPL |
| 755453 | 2017 DL_{107} | — | September 19, 2015 | Haleakala | Pan-STARRS 1 | EOS | 1.8 km | MPC · JPL |
| 755454 | 2017 DN_{107} | — | July 25, 2015 | Haleakala | Pan-STARRS 1 | · | 1.2 km | MPC · JPL |
| 755455 | 2017 DJ_{110} | — | January 18, 2008 | Catalina | CSS | GAL | 2.0 km | MPC · JPL |
| 755456 | 2017 DL_{110} | — | February 24, 2006 | Catalina | CSS | · | 2.8 km | MPC · JPL |
| 755457 | 2017 DF_{113} | — | March 4, 2013 | Haleakala | Pan-STARRS 1 | · | 1.3 km | MPC · JPL |
| 755458 | 2017 DM_{114} | — | July 26, 2014 | Haleakala | Pan-STARRS 1 | · | 1.0 km | MPC · JPL |
| 755459 | 2017 DU_{114} | — | November 5, 2016 | Mount Lemmon | Mount Lemmon Survey | · | 1.2 km | MPC · JPL |
| 755460 | 2017 DE_{115} | — | April 4, 2008 | Mount Lemmon | Mount Lemmon Survey | · | 1.6 km | MPC · JPL |
| 755461 | 2017 DJ_{115} | — | March 8, 2013 | Haleakala | Pan-STARRS 1 | · | 810 m | MPC · JPL |
| 755462 | 2017 DZ_{115} | — | February 29, 2008 | Catalina | CSS | · | 1.4 km | MPC · JPL |
| 755463 | 2017 DO_{116} | — | January 21, 2013 | Haleakala | Pan-STARRS 1 | · | 1.4 km | MPC · JPL |
| 755464 | 2017 DQ_{116} | — | July 4, 2014 | Haleakala | Pan-STARRS 1 | JUN | 930 m | MPC · JPL |
| 755465 | 2017 DB_{117} | — | January 1, 2012 | Mayhill-ISON | L. Elenin | · | 2.1 km | MPC · JPL |
| 755466 | 2017 DH_{119} | — | November 11, 2007 | Catalina | CSS | · | 1.1 km | MPC · JPL |
| 755467 | 2017 DS_{119} | — | December 27, 2005 | Kitt Peak | Spacewatch | · | 2.5 km | MPC · JPL |
| 755468 | 2017 DL_{120} | — | January 30, 2011 | Mount Lemmon | Mount Lemmon Survey | · | 1.3 km | MPC · JPL |
| 755469 | 2017 DY_{120} | — | July 28, 2014 | Haleakala | Pan-STARRS 1 | · | 1.6 km | MPC · JPL |
| 755470 | 2017 DS_{121} | — | September 17, 2006 | Kitt Peak | Spacewatch | · | 1.3 km | MPC · JPL |
| 755471 | 2017 DT_{122} | — | April 27, 2009 | Kitt Peak | Spacewatch | · | 1.5 km | MPC · JPL |
| 755472 | 2017 DR_{125} | — | March 11, 2003 | Kitt Peak | Spacewatch | DOR | 1.8 km | MPC · JPL |
| 755473 | 2017 DL_{126} | — | February 22, 2017 | Mount Lemmon | Mount Lemmon Survey | · | 1.2 km | MPC · JPL |
| 755474 | 2017 DV_{130} | — | February 22, 2017 | Haleakala | Pan-STARRS 1 | · | 2.1 km | MPC · JPL |
| 755475 | 2017 DQ_{135} | — | September 16, 2006 | Sacramento Peak | SDSS Collaboration | · | 1.5 km | MPC · JPL |
| 755476 | 2017 DZ_{145} | — | January 5, 2006 | Kitt Peak | Spacewatch | · | 1.9 km | MPC · JPL |
| 755477 | 2017 EF_{1} | — | January 26, 2009 | Kitt Peak | Spacewatch | H | 400 m | MPC · JPL |
| 755478 | 2017 EU_{4} | — | January 26, 2011 | Mount Lemmon | Mount Lemmon Survey | TIR | 2.7 km | MPC · JPL |
| 755479 | 2017 EJ_{6} | — | February 4, 2017 | Mount Lemmon | Mount Lemmon Survey | T_{j} (2.98) | 2.6 km | MPC · JPL |
| 755480 | 2017 EX_{6} | — | February 9, 2008 | Mount Lemmon | Mount Lemmon Survey | · | 1.6 km | MPC · JPL |
| 755481 | 2017 EB_{7} | — | February 24, 2006 | Kitt Peak | Spacewatch | · | 2.7 km | MPC · JPL |
| 755482 | 2017 EO_{7} | — | March 2, 2017 | Mount Lemmon | Mount Lemmon Survey | JUN | 1.0 km | MPC · JPL |
| 755483 | 2017 ER_{7} | — | February 10, 2008 | Kitt Peak | Spacewatch | · | 1.5 km | MPC · JPL |
| 755484 | 2017 EV_{9} | — | January 10, 2008 | Mount Lemmon | Mount Lemmon Survey | · | 1.6 km | MPC · JPL |
| 755485 | 2017 EA_{10} | — | November 1, 2015 | Mount Lemmon | Mount Lemmon Survey | EUP | 2.5 km | MPC · JPL |
| 755486 | 2017 EG_{11} | — | July 3, 2014 | Haleakala | Pan-STARRS 1 | · | 2.8 km | MPC · JPL |
| 755487 | 2017 EG_{12} | — | January 5, 2006 | Mount Lemmon | Mount Lemmon Survey | · | 1.7 km | MPC · JPL |
| 755488 | 2017 EN_{12} | — | February 13, 2008 | Mount Lemmon | Mount Lemmon Survey | · | 1.9 km | MPC · JPL |
| 755489 | 2017 EF_{14} | — | November 11, 2007 | Mount Lemmon | Mount Lemmon Survey | · | 1.1 km | MPC · JPL |
| 755490 | 2017 EB_{16} | — | March 25, 2006 | Kitt Peak | Spacewatch | EUP | 2.7 km | MPC · JPL |
| 755491 | 2017 ES_{16} | — | October 29, 2011 | Kitt Peak | Spacewatch | · | 960 m | MPC · JPL |
| 755492 | 2017 EB_{17} | — | January 19, 2012 | Mount Lemmon | Mount Lemmon Survey | BRA | 1.2 km | MPC · JPL |
| 755493 | 2017 EA_{18} | — | March 4, 2017 | Haleakala | Pan-STARRS 1 | · | 1.5 km | MPC · JPL |
| 755494 | 2017 EQ_{18} | — | January 3, 2017 | Haleakala | Pan-STARRS 1 | · | 2.1 km | MPC · JPL |
| 755495 | 2017 EV_{19} | — | April 11, 2013 | Kitt Peak | Spacewatch | EUN | 890 m | MPC · JPL |
| 755496 | 2017 EE_{22} | — | September 9, 2015 | Haleakala | Pan-STARRS 1 | GAL | 1.4 km | MPC · JPL |
| 755497 | 2017 EC_{24} | — | September 7, 2008 | Mount Lemmon | Mount Lemmon Survey | · | 2.8 km | MPC · JPL |
| 755498 | 2017 ET_{25} | — | March 5, 2017 | Haleakala | Pan-STARRS 1 | · | 2.0 km | MPC · JPL |
| 755499 | 2017 EJ_{26} | — | March 7, 2017 | Haleakala | Pan-STARRS 1 | T_{j} (2.99) · EUP | 2.5 km | MPC · JPL |
| 755500 | 2017 FB | — | November 17, 2010 | Mount Lemmon | Mount Lemmon Survey | H | 490 m | MPC · JPL |

== 755501–755600 ==
back to top

| Designation | | | Discovery | | | Properties | | Ref |
| Permanent | Provisional | Named after | Date | Site | Discoverer(s) | Category | Diam. | Ref |
|---|---|---|---|---|---|---|---|---|
| 755501 | 2017 FF | — | April 3, 2012 | Kitt Peak | Spacewatch | H | 500 m | MPC · JPL |
| 755502 | 2017 FQ_{1} | — | May 29, 2009 | Siding Spring | SSS | · | 1.8 km | MPC · JPL |
| 755503 | 2017 FH_{4} | — | February 18, 2013 | Mount Lemmon | Mount Lemmon Survey | · | 1.1 km | MPC · JPL |
| 755504 | 2017 FM_{4} | — | May 29, 2011 | Haleakala | Pan-STARRS 1 | T_{j} (2.84) | 2.6 km | MPC · JPL |
| 755505 | 2017 FN_{5} | — | December 30, 2005 | Kitt Peak | Spacewatch | · | 1.6 km | MPC · JPL |
| 755506 | 2017 FO_{5} | — | April 5, 1995 | Kitt Peak | Spacewatch | · | 850 m | MPC · JPL |
| 755507 | 2017 FT_{6} | — | July 12, 2013 | Haleakala | Pan-STARRS 1 | · | 2.0 km | MPC · JPL |
| 755508 | 2017 FD_{7} | — | August 27, 2005 | Palomar | NEAT | · | 1.4 km | MPC · JPL |
| 755509 Juming | 2017 FK_{8} | Juming | October 21, 2006 | Lulin | LUSS | · | 1.5 km | MPC · JPL |
| 755510 | 2017 FT_{8} | — | October 24, 2011 | Haleakala | Pan-STARRS 1 | · | 950 m | MPC · JPL |
| 755511 | 2017 FH_{9} | — | March 29, 2012 | Haleakala | Pan-STARRS 1 | EOS | 1.6 km | MPC · JPL |
| 755512 | 2017 FL_{9} | — | December 4, 2015 | Haleakala | Pan-STARRS 1 | · | 1.5 km | MPC · JPL |
| 755513 | 2017 FS_{9} | — | September 11, 2015 | Haleakala | Pan-STARRS 1 | EUN | 980 m | MPC · JPL |
| 755514 | 2017 FX_{10} | — | September 23, 2014 | Mount Lemmon | Mount Lemmon Survey | EOS | 1.4 km | MPC · JPL |
| 755515 | 2017 FM_{11} | — | October 21, 2006 | Kitt Peak | Spacewatch | · | 1.5 km | MPC · JPL |
| 755516 | 2017 FU_{11} | — | April 17, 2012 | Kitt Peak | Spacewatch | · | 2.4 km | MPC · JPL |
| 755517 | 2017 FT_{12} | — | April 14, 2013 | Mount Lemmon | Mount Lemmon Survey | · | 1.5 km | MPC · JPL |
| 755518 | 2017 FU_{12} | — | February 12, 2011 | Mount Lemmon | Mount Lemmon Survey | · | 3.0 km | MPC · JPL |
| 755519 | 2017 FR_{13} | — | October 27, 2005 | Kitt Peak | Spacewatch | · | 1.6 km | MPC · JPL |
| 755520 | 2017 FE_{15} | — | October 9, 2015 | Haleakala | Pan-STARRS 1 | DOR | 1.8 km | MPC · JPL |
| 755521 | 2017 FV_{15} | — | August 30, 2005 | Kitt Peak | Spacewatch | H | 420 m | MPC · JPL |
| 755522 | 2017 FQ_{17} | — | March 11, 2000 | Anderson Mesa | LONEOS | · | 2.9 km | MPC · JPL |
| 755523 | 2017 FF_{18} | — | March 21, 2012 | Mount Lemmon | Mount Lemmon Survey | · | 1.6 km | MPC · JPL |
| 755524 | 2017 FQ_{21} | — | August 25, 2005 | Campo Imperatore | CINEOS | · | 1.4 km | MPC · JPL |
| 755525 | 2017 FK_{22} | — | January 26, 2006 | Mount Lemmon | Mount Lemmon Survey | · | 2.1 km | MPC · JPL |
| 755526 | 2017 FZ_{24} | — | February 22, 2017 | Haleakala | Pan-STARRS 1 | · | 920 m | MPC · JPL |
| 755527 | 2017 FW_{25} | — | July 31, 2014 | Haleakala | Pan-STARRS 1 | · | 2.5 km | MPC · JPL |
| 755528 | 2017 FM_{27} | — | August 22, 2014 | Haleakala | Pan-STARRS 1 | · | 1.8 km | MPC · JPL |
| 755529 | 2017 FX_{27} | — | March 24, 2006 | Kitt Peak | Spacewatch | LIX | 2.7 km | MPC · JPL |
| 755530 | 2017 FT_{28} | — | March 18, 2017 | Mount Lemmon | Mount Lemmon Survey | · | 2.4 km | MPC · JPL |
| 755531 | 2017 FX_{29} | — | March 2, 2006 | Kitt Peak | Spacewatch | · | 2.0 km | MPC · JPL |
| 755532 | 2017 FB_{31} | — | September 1, 2013 | Mount Lemmon | Mount Lemmon Survey | TIR | 2.4 km | MPC · JPL |
| 755533 | 2017 FG_{31} | — | October 18, 2003 | Kitt Peak | Spacewatch | · | 2.6 km | MPC · JPL |
| 755534 | 2017 FU_{31} | — | March 30, 2012 | Mount Lemmon | Mount Lemmon Survey | · | 1.6 km | MPC · JPL |
| 755535 | 2017 FS_{32} | — | December 4, 2015 | Haleakala | Pan-STARRS 1 | · | 1.7 km | MPC · JPL |
| 755536 | 2017 FU_{34} | — | January 4, 2012 | Mount Lemmon | Mount Lemmon Survey | · | 1.8 km | MPC · JPL |
| 755537 | 2017 FF_{36} | — | April 28, 2012 | Mount Lemmon | Mount Lemmon Survey | · | 2.1 km | MPC · JPL |
| 755538 | 2017 FW_{36} | — | March 28, 2012 | Mount Lemmon | Mount Lemmon Survey | EOS | 1.5 km | MPC · JPL |
| 755539 | 2017 FS_{38} | — | November 20, 2015 | Mount Lemmon | Mount Lemmon Survey | · | 2.2 km | MPC · JPL |
| 755540 | 2017 FH_{39} | — | October 10, 2015 | Haleakala | Pan-STARRS 1 | (194) | 1.5 km | MPC · JPL |
| 755541 | 2017 FF_{40} | — | August 25, 2014 | Haleakala | Pan-STARRS 1 | EOS | 1.6 km | MPC · JPL |
| 755542 | 2017 FE_{43} | — | April 11, 2013 | Mount Lemmon | Mount Lemmon Survey | RAF | 720 m | MPC · JPL |
| 755543 | 2017 FF_{46} | — | February 17, 2017 | Haleakala | Pan-STARRS 1 | · | 1.6 km | MPC · JPL |
| 755544 | 2017 FX_{47} | — | January 28, 2017 | Haleakala | Pan-STARRS 1 | · | 3.4 km | MPC · JPL |
| 755545 | 2017 FD_{48} | — | September 25, 2014 | Kitt Peak | Spacewatch | · | 1.6 km | MPC · JPL |
| 755546 | 2017 FH_{48} | — | January 21, 1996 | Kitt Peak | Spacewatch | · | 1.4 km | MPC · JPL |
| 755547 | 2017 FJ_{48} | — | January 31, 2016 | Mount Lemmon | Mount Lemmon Survey | · | 1.5 km | MPC · JPL |
| 755548 | 2017 FA_{49} | — | April 18, 2006 | Kitt Peak | Spacewatch | LIX | 3.0 km | MPC · JPL |
| 755549 | 2017 FH_{49} | — | August 8, 2013 | Kitt Peak | Spacewatch | EUP | 2.1 km | MPC · JPL |
| 755550 | 2017 FY_{50} | — | September 15, 2013 | Mount Lemmon | Mount Lemmon Survey | T_{j} (2.99) · EUP | 2.7 km | MPC · JPL |
| 755551 | 2017 FE_{52} | — | April 15, 2013 | Haleakala | Pan-STARRS 1 | · | 1.6 km | MPC · JPL |
| 755552 | 2017 FR_{53} | — | March 17, 2013 | Mount Lemmon | Mount Lemmon Survey | · | 1.1 km | MPC · JPL |
| 755553 | 2017 FQ_{54} | — | February 20, 2012 | Haleakala | Pan-STARRS 1 | · | 2.2 km | MPC · JPL |
| 755554 | 2017 FB_{56} | — | July 26, 2015 | Haleakala | Pan-STARRS 1 | · | 1.2 km | MPC · JPL |
| 755555 | 2017 FE_{56} | — | July 7, 2014 | Haleakala | Pan-STARRS 1 | EUN | 930 m | MPC · JPL |
| 755556 | 2017 FB_{57} | — | April 21, 2012 | Haleakala | Pan-STARRS 1 | · | 2.3 km | MPC · JPL |
| 755557 | 2017 FE_{57} | — | February 24, 2017 | Haleakala | Pan-STARRS 1 | · | 1.6 km | MPC · JPL |
| 755558 | 2017 FL_{58} | — | January 2, 2012 | Mount Lemmon | Mount Lemmon Survey | · | 1.6 km | MPC · JPL |
| 755559 | 2017 FN_{60} | — | September 19, 2015 | Haleakala | Pan-STARRS 1 | · | 1.4 km | MPC · JPL |
| 755560 | 2017 FU_{60} | — | December 1, 2015 | Haleakala | Pan-STARRS 1 | · | 1.5 km | MPC · JPL |
| 755561 | 2017 FC_{61} | — | October 16, 2009 | Mount Lemmon | Mount Lemmon Survey | · | 2.3 km | MPC · JPL |
| 755562 | 2017 FW_{63} | — | March 29, 2012 | Kitt Peak | Spacewatch | · | 2.8 km | MPC · JPL |
| 755563 | 2017 FX_{63} | — | November 4, 2010 | La Sagra | OAM | H | 410 m | MPC · JPL |
| 755564 | 2017 FH_{65} | — | April 25, 2007 | Mount Lemmon | Mount Lemmon Survey | · | 2.7 km | MPC · JPL |
| 755565 | 2017 FK_{65} | — | April 20, 2007 | Kitt Peak | Spacewatch | · | 2.0 km | MPC · JPL |
| 755566 | 2017 FA_{67} | — | October 3, 2010 | Catalina | CSS | · | 1.9 km | MPC · JPL |
| 755567 | 2017 FF_{67} | — | February 11, 2004 | Kitt Peak | Spacewatch | EUN | 860 m | MPC · JPL |
| 755568 | 2017 FV_{68} | — | January 14, 2011 | Kitt Peak | Spacewatch | · | 2.3 km | MPC · JPL |
| 755569 | 2017 FT_{69} | — | August 14, 2013 | Haleakala | Pan-STARRS 1 | · | 2.3 km | MPC · JPL |
| 755570 | 2017 FJ_{72} | — | January 29, 2017 | Haleakala | Pan-STARRS 1 | · | 3.1 km | MPC · JPL |
| 755571 | 2017 FZ_{72} | — | April 15, 2013 | Haleakala | Pan-STARRS 1 | · | 1.4 km | MPC · JPL |
| 755572 | 2017 FQ_{75} | — | July 3, 2014 | Haleakala | Pan-STARRS 1 | · | 1.1 km | MPC · JPL |
| 755573 | 2017 FP_{76} | — | March 22, 2001 | Kitt Peak | Spacewatch | · | 2.1 km | MPC · JPL |
| 755574 | 2017 FX_{76} | — | March 16, 2012 | Haleakala | Pan-STARRS 1 | · | 1.9 km | MPC · JPL |
| 755575 | 2017 FM_{79} | — | March 7, 2013 | Mount Lemmon | Mount Lemmon Survey | · | 1.5 km | MPC · JPL |
| 755576 | 2017 FS_{79} | — | October 24, 2011 | Haleakala | Pan-STARRS 1 | · | 880 m | MPC · JPL |
| 755577 | 2017 FP_{81} | — | March 4, 2017 | Haleakala | Pan-STARRS 1 | · | 2.6 km | MPC · JPL |
| 755578 | 2017 FN_{82} | — | March 19, 2017 | Mount Lemmon | Mount Lemmon Survey | · | 1.8 km | MPC · JPL |
| 755579 | 2017 FK_{85} | — | July 31, 2014 | Haleakala | Pan-STARRS 1 | · | 1.4 km | MPC · JPL |
| 755580 | 2017 FS_{85} | — | February 22, 2017 | Mount Lemmon | Mount Lemmon Survey | · | 1.4 km | MPC · JPL |
| 755581 | 2017 FH_{86} | — | July 1, 2013 | Haleakala | Pan-STARRS 1 | EOS | 1.4 km | MPC · JPL |
| 755582 | 2017 FO_{93} | — | July 2, 2014 | Haleakala | Pan-STARRS 1 | · | 2.2 km | MPC · JPL |
| 755583 | 2017 FV_{96} | — | March 22, 2017 | Haleakala | Pan-STARRS 1 | · | 2.4 km | MPC · JPL |
| 755584 | 2017 FV_{98} | — | August 22, 2014 | Haleakala | Pan-STARRS 1 | ADE | 1.6 km | MPC · JPL |
| 755585 | 2017 FF_{100} | — | September 18, 2010 | Mount Lemmon | Mount Lemmon Survey | GEF | 1.0 km | MPC · JPL |
| 755586 | 2017 FZ_{102} | — | August 19, 2014 | Haleakala | Pan-STARRS 1 | · | 2.3 km | MPC · JPL |
| 755587 | 2017 FP_{104} | — | September 24, 2008 | Mount Lemmon | Mount Lemmon Survey | · | 2.4 km | MPC · JPL |
| 755588 | 2017 FU_{105} | — | October 8, 2015 | Haleakala | Pan-STARRS 1 | HNS | 1.0 km | MPC · JPL |
| 755589 | 2017 FY_{105} | — | April 16, 2004 | Kitt Peak | Spacewatch | · | 480 m | MPC · JPL |
| 755590 | 2017 FH_{106} | — | March 25, 2017 | Mount Lemmon | Mount Lemmon Survey | · | 2.5 km | MPC · JPL |
| 755591 | 2017 FZ_{113} | — | April 20, 2012 | Haleakala | R. Holmes | · | 2.2 km | MPC · JPL |
| 755592 | 2017 FV_{114} | — | September 28, 2013 | Mount Lemmon | Mount Lemmon Survey | (895) | 3.0 km | MPC · JPL |
| 755593 | 2017 FC_{117} | — | January 26, 2012 | Haleakala | Pan-STARRS 1 | · | 1.4 km | MPC · JPL |
| 755594 | 2017 FN_{118} | — | February 21, 2017 | Haleakala | Pan-STARRS 1 | · | 2.5 km | MPC · JPL |
| 755595 | 2017 FR_{118} | — | March 1, 2008 | Kitt Peak | Spacewatch | · | 1.4 km | MPC · JPL |
| 755596 | 2017 FU_{118} | — | March 28, 2008 | Mount Lemmon | Mount Lemmon Survey | · | 1.4 km | MPC · JPL |
| 755597 | 2017 FU_{119} | — | April 13, 2013 | Haleakala | Pan-STARRS 1 | · | 1.4 km | MPC · JPL |
| 755598 | 2017 FV_{120} | — | August 10, 2007 | Kitt Peak | Spacewatch | · | 2.3 km | MPC · JPL |
| 755599 | 2017 FH_{122} | — | January 26, 2011 | Kitt Peak | Spacewatch | · | 2.3 km | MPC · JPL |
| 755600 | 2017 FS_{123} | — | October 8, 2015 | Haleakala | Pan-STARRS 1 | EUN | 840 m | MPC · JPL |

== 755601–755700 ==
back to top

| Designation | | | Discovery | | | Properties | | Ref |
| Permanent | Provisional | Named after | Date | Site | Discoverer(s) | Category | Diam. | Ref |
|---|---|---|---|---|---|---|---|---|
| 755601 | 2017 FQ_{124} | — | September 4, 2007 | Mount Lemmon | Mount Lemmon Survey | · | 2.8 km | MPC · JPL |
| 755602 | 2017 FG_{126} | — | January 16, 2016 | Haleakala | Pan-STARRS 1 | · | 2.7 km | MPC · JPL |
| 755603 | 2017 FM_{126} | — | November 8, 2009 | Mount Lemmon | Mount Lemmon Survey | · | 2.1 km | MPC · JPL |
| 755604 | 2017 FY_{126} | — | December 21, 2003 | Kitt Peak | Spacewatch | · | 940 m | MPC · JPL |
| 755605 | 2017 FH_{127} | — | August 23, 2007 | Kitt Peak | Spacewatch | H | 450 m | MPC · JPL |
| 755606 | 2017 FS_{130} | — | February 25, 2007 | Mount Lemmon | Mount Lemmon Survey | · | 460 m | MPC · JPL |
| 755607 | 2017 FV_{132} | — | March 16, 2017 | Mount Lemmon | Mount Lemmon Survey | · | 2.6 km | MPC · JPL |
| 755608 | 2017 FM_{134} | — | September 30, 2010 | Mount Lemmon | Mount Lemmon Survey | · | 1.1 km | MPC · JPL |
| 755609 | 2017 FZ_{139} | — | November 17, 2009 | Mount Lemmon | Mount Lemmon Survey | · | 1.6 km | MPC · JPL |
| 755610 | 2017 FP_{141} | — | April 7, 2013 | Nogales | M. Schwartz, P. R. Holvorcem | · | 1.2 km | MPC · JPL |
| 755611 | 2017 FH_{143} | — | February 25, 2011 | Mount Lemmon | Mount Lemmon Survey | T_{j} (2.99) · EUP | 2.4 km | MPC · JPL |
| 755612 | 2017 FS_{143} | — | April 19, 2012 | Mount Lemmon | Mount Lemmon Survey | · | 1.9 km | MPC · JPL |
| 755613 | 2017 FQ_{148} | — | August 14, 2013 | Haleakala | Pan-STARRS 1 | LIX | 2.6 km | MPC · JPL |
| 755614 | 2017 FN_{154} | — | April 18, 2007 | Kitt Peak | Spacewatch | · | 1.8 km | MPC · JPL |
| 755615 | 2017 FB_{156} | — | September 29, 2009 | Mount Lemmon | Mount Lemmon Survey | · | 2.3 km | MPC · JPL |
| 755616 | 2017 FN_{157} | — | September 17, 2009 | Kitt Peak | Spacewatch | · | 1.7 km | MPC · JPL |
| 755617 | 2017 FP_{157} | — | March 19, 2017 | Mount Lemmon | Mount Lemmon Survey | EOS | 1.4 km | MPC · JPL |
| 755618 | 2017 FE_{162} | — | April 20, 2012 | Mount Lemmon | Mount Lemmon Survey | · | 2.1 km | MPC · JPL |
| 755619 | 2017 FS_{163} | — | March 29, 2017 | Haleakala | Pan-STARRS 1 | · | 1.5 km | MPC · JPL |
| 755620 | 2017 FN_{166} | — | March 4, 2012 | Mount Lemmon | Mount Lemmon Survey | EOS | 1.5 km | MPC · JPL |
| 755621 | 2017 FG_{174} | — | March 19, 2017 | Mount Lemmon | Mount Lemmon Survey | · | 1.5 km | MPC · JPL |
| 755622 | 2017 FS_{174} | — | March 21, 2017 | Mount Lemmon | Mount Lemmon Survey | PHO | 820 m | MPC · JPL |
| 755623 | 2017 FY_{175} | — | March 18, 2017 | Haleakala | Pan-STARRS 1 | · | 1.3 km | MPC · JPL |
| 755624 | 2017 FU_{181} | — | March 21, 2017 | Haleakala | Pan-STARRS 1 | · | 2.2 km | MPC · JPL |
| 755625 | 2017 FY_{188} | — | March 27, 2017 | Haleakala | Pan-STARRS 1 | · | 860 m | MPC · JPL |
| 755626 | 2017 FD_{195} | — | October 13, 2014 | Mount Lemmon | Mount Lemmon Survey | BRA | 1.2 km | MPC · JPL |
| 755627 | 2017 FU_{196} | — | March 27, 2017 | Mount Lemmon | Mount Lemmon Survey | · | 1.4 km | MPC · JPL |
| 755628 | 2017 GA_{1} | — | January 28, 2017 | Haleakala | Pan-STARRS 1 | · | 2.1 km | MPC · JPL |
| 755629 | 2017 GP_{1} | — | October 1, 2014 | Haleakala | Pan-STARRS 1 | · | 1.7 km | MPC · JPL |
| 755630 | 2017 GF_{2} | — | March 6, 2017 | Mount Lemmon | Mount Lemmon Survey | · | 2.9 km | MPC · JPL |
| 755631 | 2017 GZ_{5} | — | January 31, 2009 | Kitt Peak | Spacewatch | H | 420 m | MPC · JPL |
| 755632 | 2017 GZ_{9} | — | October 1, 2013 | Kitt Peak | Spacewatch | · | 2.1 km | MPC · JPL |
| 755633 | 2017 GL_{12} | — | July 23, 2009 | Siding Spring | SSS | · | 1.2 km | MPC · JPL |
| 755634 | 2017 GD_{16} | — | April 1, 2017 | Haleakala | Pan-STARRS 1 | · | 800 m | MPC · JPL |
| 755635 | 2017 GL_{16} | — | April 1, 2017 | Haleakala | Pan-STARRS 1 | · | 660 m | MPC · JPL |
| 755636 | 2017 GW_{17} | — | April 28, 2004 | Kitt Peak | Spacewatch | · | 580 m | MPC · JPL |
| 755637 | 2017 GY_{17} | — | April 6, 2017 | Haleakala | Pan-STARRS 1 | · | 2.8 km | MPC · JPL |
| 755638 | 2017 GV_{20} | — | April 6, 2017 | Mount Lemmon | Mount Lemmon Survey | · | 1.2 km | MPC · JPL |
| 755639 | 2017 GP_{28} | — | April 4, 2017 | Haleakala | Pan-STARRS 1 | · | 1.6 km | MPC · JPL |
| 755640 | 2017 HH_{6} | — | January 14, 2011 | Kitt Peak | Spacewatch | · | 1.6 km | MPC · JPL |
| 755641 | 2017 HW_{9} | — | July 20, 2009 | Siding Spring | SSS | · | 1.6 km | MPC · JPL |
| 755642 | 2017 HO_{10} | — | May 15, 2012 | Haleakala | Pan-STARRS 1 | · | 2.4 km | MPC · JPL |
| 755643 | 2017 HV_{10} | — | September 9, 2015 | Haleakala | Pan-STARRS 1 | H | 440 m | MPC · JPL |
| 755644 | 2017 HM_{11} | — | September 9, 2015 | Haleakala | Pan-STARRS 1 | HNS | 910 m | MPC · JPL |
| 755645 | 2017 HY_{11} | — | March 24, 2017 | Haleakala | Pan-STARRS 1 | · | 3.1 km | MPC · JPL |
| 755646 | 2017 HK_{12} | — | December 14, 2015 | Mount Lemmon | Mount Lemmon Survey | · | 1.2 km | MPC · JPL |
| 755647 | 2017 HT_{12} | — | April 19, 2006 | Kitt Peak | Spacewatch | · | 3.0 km | MPC · JPL |
| 755648 | 2017 HU_{12} | — | August 24, 2007 | Kitt Peak | Spacewatch | · | 2.3 km | MPC · JPL |
| 755649 | 2017 HV_{17} | — | March 5, 2017 | Haleakala | Pan-STARRS 1 | · | 2.5 km | MPC · JPL |
| 755650 | 2017 HK_{18} | — | February 3, 2016 | Haleakala | Pan-STARRS 1 | · | 2.1 km | MPC · JPL |
| 755651 | 2017 HW_{22} | — | March 5, 2017 | Haleakala | Pan-STARRS 1 | · | 3.1 km | MPC · JPL |
| 755652 | 2017 HD_{23} | — | February 9, 2005 | Mount Lemmon | Mount Lemmon Survey | · | 2.4 km | MPC · JPL |
| 755653 | 2017 HT_{23} | — | September 19, 2014 | Haleakala | Pan-STARRS 1 | · | 1.8 km | MPC · JPL |
| 755654 | 2017 HK_{25} | — | September 23, 2005 | Kitt Peak | Spacewatch | DOR | 1.8 km | MPC · JPL |
| 755655 | 2017 HT_{30} | — | October 3, 2014 | Mount Lemmon | Mount Lemmon Survey | EUN | 1.1 km | MPC · JPL |
| 755656 | 2017 HX_{31} | — | November 26, 2009 | Kitt Peak | Spacewatch | · | 2.2 km | MPC · JPL |
| 755657 | 2017 HY_{32} | — | July 25, 2014 | Haleakala | Pan-STARRS 1 | · | 2.0 km | MPC · JPL |
| 755658 | 2017 HB_{35} | — | May 16, 2013 | Haleakala | Pan-STARRS 1 | · | 1.1 km | MPC · JPL |
| 755659 | 2017 HT_{40} | — | March 22, 2012 | Mount Lemmon | Mount Lemmon Survey | MRX | 800 m | MPC · JPL |
| 755660 | 2017 HZ_{41} | — | September 24, 2014 | Mount Lemmon | Mount Lemmon Survey | EOS | 1.4 km | MPC · JPL |
| 755661 | 2017 HT_{45} | — | November 17, 2014 | Mount Lemmon | Mount Lemmon Survey | · | 2.2 km | MPC · JPL |
| 755662 | 2017 HN_{47} | — | September 14, 2005 | Kitt Peak | Spacewatch | RAF | 670 m | MPC · JPL |
| 755663 | 2017 HB_{50} | — | April 20, 2006 | Kitt Peak | Spacewatch | LIX | 3.3 km | MPC · JPL |
| 755664 | 2017 HB_{58} | — | April 13, 2012 | Haleakala | Pan-STARRS 1 | · | 1.5 km | MPC · JPL |
| 755665 | 2017 HN_{61} | — | October 17, 2010 | Mount Lemmon | Mount Lemmon Survey | · | 1 km | MPC · JPL |
| 755666 | 2017 HQ_{61} | — | March 23, 2006 | Mount Lemmon | Mount Lemmon Survey | · | 2.2 km | MPC · JPL |
| 755667 | 2017 HS_{61} | — | January 4, 2016 | Haleakala | Pan-STARRS 1 | · | 2.8 km | MPC · JPL |
| 755668 | 2017 HX_{62} | — | March 7, 2016 | Haleakala | Pan-STARRS 1 | EOS | 1.6 km | MPC · JPL |
| 755669 | 2017 HA_{63} | — | April 27, 2017 | Haleakala | Pan-STARRS 1 | TIR | 2.0 km | MPC · JPL |
| 755670 | 2017 HT_{63} | — | April 27, 2017 | Haleakala | Pan-STARRS 1 | T_{j} (2.94) | 3.9 km | MPC · JPL |
| 755671 | 2017 HB_{70} | — | April 25, 2017 | Haleakala | Pan-STARRS 1 | · | 560 m | MPC · JPL |
| 755672 | 2017 HZ_{82} | — | October 18, 2007 | Mount Lemmon | Mount Lemmon Survey | · | 2.2 km | MPC · JPL |
| 755673 | 2017 HB_{88} | — | September 29, 2011 | Mount Lemmon | Mount Lemmon Survey | · | 510 m | MPC · JPL |
| 755674 | 2017 JD | — | April 3, 2012 | Kitt Peak | Spacewatch | · | 1.8 km | MPC · JPL |
| 755675 | 2017 JC_{1} | — | July 2, 2015 | Haleakala | Pan-STARRS 1 | H | 540 m | MPC · JPL |
| 755676 | 2017 JS_{3} | — | April 15, 2013 | Haleakala | Pan-STARRS 1 | · | 1.4 km | MPC · JPL |
| 755677 | 2017 JY_{4} | — | May 25, 2009 | Mount Lemmon | Mount Lemmon Survey | (194) | 1.0 km | MPC · JPL |
| 755678 | 2017 JT_{5} | — | July 13, 2013 | Haleakala | Pan-STARRS 1 | · | 1.6 km | MPC · JPL |
| 755679 | 2017 JX_{8} | — | May 15, 2017 | Mount Lemmon | Mount Lemmon Survey | MAR | 740 m | MPC · JPL |
| 755680 | 2017 KV_{6} | — | March 7, 2017 | Haleakala | Pan-STARRS 1 | · | 2.5 km | MPC · JPL |
| 755681 | 2017 KF_{8} | — | November 3, 2010 | Mount Lemmon | Mount Lemmon Survey | · | 2.0 km | MPC · JPL |
| 755682 | 2017 KS_{8} | — | September 24, 2014 | Mount Lemmon | Mount Lemmon Survey | · | 2.4 km | MPC · JPL |
| 755683 | 2017 KA_{10} | — | January 15, 2015 | Mount Lemmon | Mount Lemmon Survey | · | 2.6 km | MPC · JPL |
| 755684 | 2017 KD_{11} | — | January 4, 2016 | Haleakala | Pan-STARRS 1 | · | 1.6 km | MPC · JPL |
| 755685 | 2017 KJ_{11} | — | January 7, 2016 | Haleakala | Pan-STARRS 1 | · | 2.9 km | MPC · JPL |
| 755686 | 2017 KT_{13} | — | April 4, 2011 | Mount Lemmon | Mount Lemmon Survey | · | 2.3 km | MPC · JPL |
| 755687 | 2017 KK_{17} | — | September 12, 2009 | Kitt Peak | Spacewatch | HOF | 2.1 km | MPC · JPL |
| 755688 | 2017 KF_{22} | — | February 11, 2011 | Mount Lemmon | Mount Lemmon Survey | · | 1.3 km | MPC · JPL |
| 755689 | 2017 KP_{24} | — | March 7, 2016 | Haleakala | Pan-STARRS 1 | · | 2.3 km | MPC · JPL |
| 755690 | 2017 KB_{29} | — | August 15, 2009 | Catalina | CSS | · | 1.1 km | MPC · JPL |
| 755691 | 2017 KL_{29} | — | September 13, 2007 | Mount Lemmon | Mount Lemmon Survey | · | 2.5 km | MPC · JPL |
| 755692 | 2017 KH_{36} | — | February 3, 2016 | Haleakala | Pan-STARRS 1 | · | 2.8 km | MPC · JPL |
| 755693 | 2017 KA_{39} | — | April 2, 2016 | Haleakala | Pan-STARRS 1 | · | 2.2 km | MPC · JPL |
| 755694 | 2017 KH_{45} | — | June 6, 2011 | Haleakala | Pan-STARRS 1 | · | 2.6 km | MPC · JPL |
| 755695 | 2017 MW_{3} | — | May 19, 2017 | Mount Lemmon | Mount Lemmon Survey | · | 1.4 km | MPC · JPL |
| 755696 | 2017 MY_{7} | — | September 8, 2015 | XuYi | PMO NEO Survey Program | H | 510 m | MPC · JPL |
| 755697 | 2017 MX_{10} | — | June 30, 2017 | Mount Lemmon | Mount Lemmon Survey | · | 610 m | MPC · JPL |
| 755698 | 2017 MR_{13} | — | October 7, 2013 | Mount Lemmon | Mount Lemmon Survey | · | 1.9 km | MPC · JPL |
| 755699 | 2017 MK_{14} | — | June 21, 2017 | Haleakala | Pan-STARRS 1 | · | 2.7 km | MPC · JPL |
| 755700 | 2017 MX_{15} | — | June 30, 2017 | Mount Lemmon | Mount Lemmon Survey | · | 730 m | MPC · JPL |

== 755701–755800 ==
back to top

| Designation | | | Discovery | | | Properties | | Ref |
| Permanent | Provisional | Named after | Date | Site | Discoverer(s) | Category | Diam. | Ref |
|---|---|---|---|---|---|---|---|---|
| 755701 | 2017 MA_{16} | — | June 22, 2017 | Haleakala | Pan-STARRS 1 | · | 510 m | MPC · JPL |
| 755702 | 2017 MZ_{23} | — | June 25, 2017 | Haleakala | Pan-STARRS 1 | · | 2.1 km | MPC · JPL |
| 755703 | 2017 MP_{24} | — | June 26, 2017 | Haleakala | Pan-STARRS 1 | GEF | 950 m | MPC · JPL |
| 755704 | 2017 MK_{26} | — | June 21, 2017 | Haleakala | Pan-STARRS 1 | TIR | 2.6 km | MPC · JPL |
| 755705 | 2017 MD_{27} | — | June 21, 2017 | Haleakala | Pan-STARRS 1 | · | 1.5 km | MPC · JPL |
| 755706 | 2017 MB_{28} | — | June 25, 2017 | Haleakala | Pan-STARRS 1 | · | 2.7 km | MPC · JPL |
| 755707 | 2017 MV_{32} | — | January 20, 2015 | Haleakala | Pan-STARRS 1 | EOS | 1.5 km | MPC · JPL |
| 755708 | 2017 MJ_{38} | — | January 28, 2015 | Haleakala | Pan-STARRS 1 | · | 1.6 km | MPC · JPL |
| 755709 | 2017 NP | — | April 14, 2010 | Kitt Peak | Spacewatch | · | 580 m | MPC · JPL |
| 755710 | 2017 NK_{3} | — | June 29, 2017 | Mount Lemmon | Mount Lemmon Survey | · | 560 m | MPC · JPL |
| 755711 | 2017 NR_{4} | — | June 17, 2007 | Kitt Peak | Spacewatch | · | 620 m | MPC · JPL |
| 755712 | 2017 NQ_{9} | — | July 5, 2017 | Haleakala | Pan-STARRS 1 | NYS | 730 m | MPC · JPL |
| 755713 | 2017 NY_{12} | — | July 15, 2017 | Haleakala | Pan-STARRS 1 | MRX | 890 m | MPC · JPL |
| 755714 | 2017 NV_{13} | — | July 15, 2017 | Haleakala | Pan-STARRS 1 | · | 520 m | MPC · JPL |
| 755715 | 2017 NR_{18} | — | July 15, 2017 | Haleakala | Pan-STARRS 1 | · | 490 m | MPC · JPL |
| 755716 | 2017 OS | — | April 1, 2016 | Haleakala | Pan-STARRS 1 | · | 680 m | MPC · JPL |
| 755717 | 2017 OY | — | September 3, 2007 | Catalina | CSS | · | 510 m | MPC · JPL |
| 755718 | 2017 OQ_{3} | — | September 12, 2007 | Kitt Peak | Spacewatch | · | 490 m | MPC · JPL |
| 755719 | 2017 OL_{4} | — | June 21, 2017 | Haleakala | Pan-STARRS 1 | · | 580 m | MPC · JPL |
| 755720 | 2017 OC_{8} | — | January 29, 2012 | Kitt Peak | Spacewatch | · | 1.0 km | MPC · JPL |
| 755721 | 2017 OO_{10} | — | October 29, 2014 | Haleakala | Pan-STARRS 1 | · | 670 m | MPC · JPL |
| 755722 | 2017 OK_{12} | — | October 8, 2010 | Kitt Peak | Spacewatch | NYS | 980 m | MPC · JPL |
| 755723 | 2017 OM_{13} | — | January 9, 2016 | Haleakala | Pan-STARRS 1 | · | 2.0 km | MPC · JPL |
| 755724 | 2017 OH_{19} | — | December 29, 2003 | Socorro | LINEAR | · | 490 m | MPC · JPL |
| 755725 | 2017 OP_{26} | — | July 26, 2017 | Haleakala | Pan-STARRS 1 | · | 1.9 km | MPC · JPL |
| 755726 | 2017 OV_{38} | — | September 17, 2010 | Mount Lemmon | Mount Lemmon Survey | · | 540 m | MPC · JPL |
| 755727 | 2017 OE_{41} | — | October 25, 2011 | Haleakala | Pan-STARRS 1 | · | 700 m | MPC · JPL |
| 755728 | 2017 OM_{48} | — | September 15, 2010 | Kitt Peak | Spacewatch | · | 730 m | MPC · JPL |
| 755729 | 2017 OK_{50} | — | September 23, 2008 | Mount Lemmon | Mount Lemmon Survey | · | 1.3 km | MPC · JPL |
| 755730 | 2017 OV_{50} | — | November 27, 2014 | Haleakala | Pan-STARRS 1 | · | 530 m | MPC · JPL |
| 755731 | 2017 OE_{51} | — | April 18, 2015 | Cerro Tololo | DECam | EOS | 1.4 km | MPC · JPL |
| 755732 | 2017 OY_{53} | — | September 16, 2006 | Catalina | CSS | TIR | 2.4 km | MPC · JPL |
| 755733 | 2017 OA_{61} | — | June 5, 2016 | Haleakala | Pan-STARRS 1 | · | 2.0 km | MPC · JPL |
| 755734 | 2017 OG_{62} | — | September 19, 2003 | Kitt Peak | Spacewatch | · | 650 m | MPC · JPL |
| 755735 | 2017 OC_{63} | — | June 1, 2013 | Nogales | M. Schwartz, P. R. Holvorcem | · | 640 m | MPC · JPL |
| 755736 | 2017 OH_{65} | — | July 30, 2017 | Haleakala | Pan-STARRS 1 | · | 1.7 km | MPC · JPL |
| 755737 | 2017 OW_{65} | — | July 30, 2017 | Haleakala | Pan-STARRS 1 | · | 590 m | MPC · JPL |
| 755738 | 2017 OC_{66} | — | July 30, 2017 | Haleakala | Pan-STARRS 1 | V | 460 m | MPC · JPL |
| 755739 | 2017 OK_{67} | — | March 14, 2016 | Mount Lemmon | Mount Lemmon Survey | · | 610 m | MPC · JPL |
| 755740 | 2017 OM_{84} | — | July 30, 2017 | Haleakala | Pan-STARRS 1 | · | 740 m | MPC · JPL |
| 755741 | 2017 OL_{85} | — | October 23, 2012 | Mount Lemmon | Mount Lemmon Survey | VER | 2.2 km | MPC · JPL |
| 755742 | 2017 ON_{89} | — | April 29, 2016 | Mount Lemmon | Mount Lemmon Survey | · | 1.3 km | MPC · JPL |
| 755743 | 2017 OL_{91} | — | July 30, 2017 | Haleakala | Pan-STARRS 1 | · | 520 m | MPC · JPL |
| 755744 | 2017 OW_{91} | — | July 30, 2017 | Haleakala | Pan-STARRS 1 | · | 790 m | MPC · JPL |
| 755745 | 2017 OZ_{91} | — | July 25, 2017 | Haleakala | Pan-STARRS 1 | · | 530 m | MPC · JPL |
| 755746 | 2017 OH_{92} | — | April 1, 2016 | Haleakala | Pan-STARRS 1 | · | 660 m | MPC · JPL |
| 755747 | 2017 OZ_{92} | — | July 30, 2017 | Haleakala | Pan-STARRS 1 | · | 840 m | MPC · JPL |
| 755748 | 2017 OT_{111} | — | July 30, 2017 | Haleakala | Pan-STARRS 1 | · | 1.9 km | MPC · JPL |
| 755749 | 2017 OO_{119} | — | July 25, 2017 | Haleakala | Pan-STARRS 1 | · | 2.1 km | MPC · JPL |
| 755750 | 2017 PV_{20} | — | September 18, 2003 | Kitt Peak | Spacewatch | · | 640 m | MPC · JPL |
| 755751 | 2017 PT_{24} | — | June 10, 2013 | Mount Lemmon | Mount Lemmon Survey | · | 850 m | MPC · JPL |
| 755752 | 2017 PH_{25} | — | August 15, 2006 | Siding Spring | SSS | · | 2.4 km | MPC · JPL |
| 755753 | 2017 PK_{27} | — | August 13, 2017 | Haleakala | Pan-STARRS 1 | EOS | 1.5 km | MPC · JPL |
| 755754 | 2017 PH_{38} | — | September 15, 2007 | Kitt Peak | Spacewatch | · | 490 m | MPC · JPL |
| 755755 | 2017 PU_{38} | — | December 4, 2007 | Mount Lemmon | Mount Lemmon Survey | THM | 1.6 km | MPC · JPL |
| 755756 | 2017 PN_{40} | — | August 15, 2017 | Haleakala | Pan-STARRS 1 | · | 2.8 km | MPC · JPL |
| 755757 | 2017 PU_{40} | — | April 30, 2011 | Mount Lemmon | Mount Lemmon Survey | · | 1.3 km | MPC · JPL |
| 755758 | 2017 PG_{52} | — | August 15, 2017 | Haleakala | Pan-STARRS 1 | · | 3.5 km | MPC · JPL |
| 755759 | 2017 PR_{53} | — | August 1, 2017 | Haleakala | Pan-STARRS 1 | · | 2.5 km | MPC · JPL |
| 755760 | 2017 PN_{54} | — | August 3, 2017 | Haleakala | Pan-STARRS 1 | · | 770 m | MPC · JPL |
| 755761 | 2017 PX_{54} | — | August 3, 2017 | Haleakala | Pan-STARRS 1 | NYS | 670 m | MPC · JPL |
| 755762 | 2017 PP_{55} | — | August 6, 2017 | Haleakala | Pan-STARRS 1 | · | 900 m | MPC · JPL |
| 755763 | 2017 PZ_{55} | — | August 1, 2017 | Haleakala | Pan-STARRS 1 | · | 530 m | MPC · JPL |
| 755764 | 2017 PU_{63} | — | August 15, 2017 | Haleakala | Pan-STARRS 1 | · | 2.3 km | MPC · JPL |
| 755765 | 2017 QX_{4} | — | October 28, 2014 | Kitt Peak | Spacewatch | · | 560 m | MPC · JPL |
| 755766 | 2017 QA_{5} | — | September 12, 2007 | Mount Lemmon | Mount Lemmon Survey | · | 520 m | MPC · JPL |
| 755767 | 2017 QU_{5} | — | September 30, 2011 | Kitt Peak | Spacewatch | · | 480 m | MPC · JPL |
| 755768 | 2017 QJ_{12} | — | October 27, 2011 | Mount Lemmon | Mount Lemmon Survey | · | 510 m | MPC · JPL |
| 755769 | 2017 QU_{13} | — | September 6, 2008 | Mount Lemmon | Mount Lemmon Survey | MRX | 990 m | MPC · JPL |
| 755770 | 2017 QG_{20} | — | September 16, 2012 | Mount Lemmon | Mount Lemmon Survey | · | 1.7 km | MPC · JPL |
| 755771 | 2017 QY_{33} | — | August 31, 2014 | Haleakala | Pan-STARRS 1 | · | 660 m | MPC · JPL |
| 755772 | 2017 QV_{36} | — | October 17, 2012 | Mount Lemmon | Mount Lemmon Survey | · | 2.3 km | MPC · JPL |
| 755773 | 2017 QD_{37} | — | August 26, 2012 | Catalina | CSS | · | 1.9 km | MPC · JPL |
| 755774 | 2017 QP_{37} | — | September 19, 2014 | Haleakala | Pan-STARRS 1 | · | 620 m | MPC · JPL |
| 755775 | 2017 QB_{40} | — | August 21, 2006 | Kitt Peak | Spacewatch | · | 840 m | MPC · JPL |
| 755776 | 2017 QG_{52} | — | January 23, 2015 | Haleakala | Pan-STARRS 1 | · | 3.2 km | MPC · JPL |
| 755777 | 2017 QP_{52} | — | March 3, 2016 | Haleakala | Pan-STARRS 1 | · | 2.2 km | MPC · JPL |
| 755778 | 2017 QD_{55} | — | June 14, 2010 | Mount Lemmon | Mount Lemmon Survey | · | 620 m | MPC · JPL |
| 755779 | 2017 QU_{57} | — | August 20, 2017 | Haleakala | Pan-STARRS 1 | · | 2.9 km | MPC · JPL |
| 755780 | 2017 QQ_{58} | — | August 20, 2017 | Haleakala | Pan-STARRS 1 | · | 1.6 km | MPC · JPL |
| 755781 | 2017 QH_{59} | — | August 20, 2017 | Haleakala | Pan-STARRS 1 | V | 450 m | MPC · JPL |
| 755782 | 2017 QM_{59} | — | December 29, 2013 | Haleakala | Pan-STARRS 1 | · | 1.7 km | MPC · JPL |
| 755783 | 2017 QQ_{59} | — | October 26, 2013 | Catalina | CSS | · | 1.0 km | MPC · JPL |
| 755784 | 2017 QE_{61} | — | July 7, 2010 | Kitt Peak | Spacewatch | · | 550 m | MPC · JPL |
| 755785 | 2017 QL_{67} | — | September 17, 2013 | Mount Lemmon | Mount Lemmon Survey | · | 1.7 km | MPC · JPL |
| 755786 | 2017 QG_{69} | — | May 1, 2016 | Cerro Tololo | DECam | · | 710 m | MPC · JPL |
| 755787 | 2017 QR_{75} | — | August 31, 2017 | Haleakala | Pan-STARRS 1 | · | 700 m | MPC · JPL |
| 755788 | 2017 QK_{84} | — | August 18, 2017 | Haleakala | Pan-STARRS 1 | · | 2.4 km | MPC · JPL |
| 755789 | 2017 QT_{92} | — | August 16, 2017 | Haleakala | Pan-STARRS 1 | · | 1.6 km | MPC · JPL |
| 755790 | 2017 QW_{92} | — | August 24, 2017 | Haleakala | Pan-STARRS 1 | · | 2.9 km | MPC · JPL |
| 755791 | 2017 QZ_{92} | — | August 18, 2017 | Haleakala | Pan-STARRS 1 | · | 2.1 km | MPC · JPL |
| 755792 | 2017 QP_{98} | — | February 14, 2015 | Mount Lemmon | Mount Lemmon Survey | · | 1.7 km | MPC · JPL |
| 755793 | 2017 QK_{99} | — | February 10, 2016 | Haleakala | Pan-STARRS 1 | V | 440 m | MPC · JPL |
| 755794 | 2017 QM_{107} | — | May 7, 2016 | Haleakala | Pan-STARRS 1 | · | 910 m | MPC · JPL |
| 755795 | 2017 QK_{118} | — | August 30, 2017 | Mount Lemmon | Mount Lemmon Survey | EOS | 1.5 km | MPC · JPL |
| 755796 | 2017 QU_{132} | — | August 23, 2017 | Haleakala | Pan-STARRS 1 | · | 2.2 km | MPC · JPL |
| 755797 | 2017 QF_{135} | — | August 24, 2017 | Haleakala | Pan-STARRS 1 | · | 2.7 km | MPC · JPL |
| 755798 | 2017 RZ | — | December 11, 2012 | Mount Lemmon | Mount Lemmon Survey | H | 460 m | MPC · JPL |
| 755799 | 2017 RN_{4} | — | March 24, 2012 | Mount Lemmon | Mount Lemmon Survey | · | 960 m | MPC · JPL |
| 755800 | 2017 RT_{7} | — | July 1, 2013 | Haleakala | Pan-STARRS 1 | · | 890 m | MPC · JPL |

== 755801–755900 ==
back to top

| Designation | | | Discovery | | | Properties | | Ref |
| Permanent | Provisional | Named after | Date | Site | Discoverer(s) | Category | Diam. | Ref |
|---|---|---|---|---|---|---|---|---|
| 755801 | 2017 RW_{8} | — | October 19, 2012 | Mount Lemmon | Mount Lemmon Survey | · | 1.8 km | MPC · JPL |
| 755802 | 2017 RE_{14} | — | December 8, 2015 | Haleakala | Pan-STARRS 1 | H | 380 m | MPC · JPL |
| 755803 | 2017 RF_{19} | — | July 28, 2011 | Haleakala | Pan-STARRS 1 | · | 3.0 km | MPC · JPL |
| 755804 | 2017 RC_{20} | — | April 27, 2011 | Mount Lemmon | Mount Lemmon Survey | · | 1.9 km | MPC · JPL |
| 755805 | 2017 RC_{23} | — | October 10, 2012 | Haleakala | Pan-STARRS 1 | · | 2.2 km | MPC · JPL |
| 755806 | 2017 RH_{29} | — | September 2, 2007 | Siding Spring | K. Sárneczky, L. Kiss | · | 560 m | MPC · JPL |
| 755807 | 2017 RL_{29} | — | August 1, 2017 | Haleakala | Pan-STARRS 1 | · | 1.8 km | MPC · JPL |
| 755808 | 2017 RS_{31} | — | June 12, 2013 | Haleakala | Pan-STARRS 1 | · | 860 m | MPC · JPL |
| 755809 | 2017 RG_{34} | — | November 19, 2006 | Kitt Peak | Spacewatch | · | 990 m | MPC · JPL |
| 755810 | 2017 RT_{35} | — | August 30, 2003 | Kitt Peak | Spacewatch | · | 540 m | MPC · JPL |
| 755811 | 2017 RT_{36} | — | August 1, 2017 | Haleakala | Pan-STARRS 1 | · | 2.3 km | MPC · JPL |
| 755812 | 2017 RK_{40} | — | May 3, 2016 | Mount Lemmon | Mount Lemmon Survey | · | 1.8 km | MPC · JPL |
| 755813 | 2017 RA_{44} | — | December 3, 2007 | Kitt Peak | Spacewatch | · | 480 m | MPC · JPL |
| 755814 | 2017 RH_{44} | — | September 29, 2009 | Mount Lemmon | Mount Lemmon Survey | · | 1.0 km | MPC · JPL |
| 755815 | 2017 RT_{50} | — | September 1, 2013 | Mount Lemmon | Mount Lemmon Survey | · | 700 m | MPC · JPL |
| 755816 | 2017 RC_{54} | — | April 19, 2015 | Cerro Tololo | DECam | · | 2.2 km | MPC · JPL |
| 755817 | 2017 RO_{54} | — | March 21, 2009 | Mount Lemmon | Mount Lemmon Survey | MAS | 520 m | MPC · JPL |
| 755818 | 2017 RC_{58} | — | August 26, 2003 | Cerro Tololo | Deep Ecliptic Survey | · | 500 m | MPC · JPL |
| 755819 | 2017 RG_{59} | — | September 25, 2012 | Kitt Peak | Spacewatch | EOS | 1.7 km | MPC · JPL |
| 755820 | 2017 RW_{62} | — | August 19, 2006 | Kitt Peak | Spacewatch | · | 2.3 km | MPC · JPL |
| 755821 | 2017 RE_{79} | — | September 6, 2013 | Mount Lemmon | Mount Lemmon Survey | (5) | 1.0 km | MPC · JPL |
| 755822 | 2017 RH_{80} | — | September 18, 2003 | Kitt Peak | Spacewatch | · | 580 m | MPC · JPL |
| 755823 | 2017 RR_{80} | — | September 27, 2002 | Palomar | NEAT | MAS | 510 m | MPC · JPL |
| 755824 | 2017 RD_{84} | — | March 19, 2009 | Mount Lemmon | Mount Lemmon Survey | · | 3.5 km | MPC · JPL |
| 755825 | 2017 RM_{84} | — | July 30, 2017 | Haleakala | Pan-STARRS 1 | · | 1.3 km | MPC · JPL |
| 755826 | 2017 RO_{84} | — | October 10, 2010 | Mount Lemmon | Mount Lemmon Survey | · | 780 m | MPC · JPL |
| 755827 | 2017 RC_{87} | — | October 25, 2000 | Socorro | LINEAR | · | 1.2 km | MPC · JPL |
| 755828 | 2017 RE_{88} | — | October 21, 2003 | Kitt Peak | Spacewatch | · | 620 m | MPC · JPL |
| 755829 | 2017 RF_{88} | — | October 17, 2010 | Mount Lemmon | Mount Lemmon Survey | · | 710 m | MPC · JPL |
| 755830 | 2017 RO_{91} | — | July 30, 2017 | Haleakala | Pan-STARRS 1 | · | 1.4 km | MPC · JPL |
| 755831 | 2017 RM_{92} | — | October 26, 2005 | Kitt Peak | Spacewatch | · | 2.5 km | MPC · JPL |
| 755832 | 2017 RE_{96} | — | January 27, 2012 | Kitt Peak | Spacewatch | MAS | 590 m | MPC · JPL |
| 755833 | 2017 RD_{102} | — | September 2, 2010 | Mount Lemmon | Mount Lemmon Survey | · | 580 m | MPC · JPL |
| 755834 | 2017 RK_{108} | — | October 10, 2012 | Haleakala | Pan-STARRS 1 | · | 2.6 km | MPC · JPL |
| 755835 | 2017 RU_{120} | — | April 18, 2015 | Cerro Tololo | DECam | VER | 2.2 km | MPC · JPL |
| 755836 | 2017 RO_{142} | — | April 18, 2015 | Cerro Tololo | DECam | · | 2.8 km | MPC · JPL |
| 755837 | 2017 SW | — | November 17, 2014 | Haleakala | Pan-STARRS 1 | V | 450 m | MPC · JPL |
| 755838 | 2017 SK_{3} | — | August 31, 2017 | Haleakala | Pan-STARRS 1 | V | 450 m | MPC · JPL |
| 755839 | 2017 SS_{9} | — | January 17, 2015 | Mount Lemmon | Mount Lemmon Survey | · | 560 m | MPC · JPL |
| 755840 | 2017 SW_{9} | — | September 4, 2003 | Kitt Peak | Spacewatch | · | 630 m | MPC · JPL |
| 755841 | 2017 SY_{9} | — | October 15, 2007 | Kitt Peak | Spacewatch | · | 570 m | MPC · JPL |
| 755842 | 2017 SE_{10} | — | October 8, 2012 | Haleakala | Pan-STARRS 1 | · | 2.5 km | MPC · JPL |
| 755843 | 2017 SV_{18} | — | August 24, 2006 | Socorro | LINEAR | · | 700 m | MPC · JPL |
| 755844 | 2017 SX_{22} | — | September 25, 2000 | Socorro | LINEAR | · | 510 m | MPC · JPL |
| 755845 | 2017 SD_{25} | — | January 17, 2016 | Haleakala | Pan-STARRS 1 | · | 900 m | MPC · JPL |
| 755846 | 2017 SY_{31} | — | April 25, 2006 | Kitt Peak | Spacewatch | · | 620 m | MPC · JPL |
| 755847 | 2017 SH_{32} | — | September 13, 2007 | Mount Lemmon | Mount Lemmon Survey | · | 1.6 km | MPC · JPL |
| 755848 | 2017 SB_{34} | — | August 15, 2010 | La Sagra | OAM | (2076) | 730 m | MPC · JPL |
| 755849 | 2017 SH_{35} | — | August 21, 2006 | Kitt Peak | Spacewatch | · | 850 m | MPC · JPL |
| 755850 | 2017 SG_{36} | — | July 30, 2017 | Haleakala | Pan-STARRS 1 | · | 730 m | MPC · JPL |
| 755851 | 2017 SP_{40} | — | January 14, 2011 | Mount Lemmon | Mount Lemmon Survey | V | 530 m | MPC · JPL |
| 755852 | 2017 SQ_{40} | — | August 29, 2000 | La Silla | Barbieri, C. | · | 570 m | MPC · JPL |
| 755853 | 2017 SN_{45} | — | March 13, 2013 | Haleakala | Pan-STARRS 1 | · | 500 m | MPC · JPL |
| 755854 | 2017 SD_{46} | — | January 18, 2016 | Haleakala | Pan-STARRS 1 | · | 860 m | MPC · JPL |
| 755855 | 2017 SJ_{46} | — | September 23, 2008 | Mount Lemmon | Mount Lemmon Survey | · | 1.9 km | MPC · JPL |
| 755856 | 2017 SR_{50} | — | August 13, 2012 | Kitt Peak | Spacewatch | · | 1.7 km | MPC · JPL |
| 755857 | 2017 SN_{51} | — | August 24, 2017 | Haleakala | Pan-STARRS 1 | · | 750 m | MPC · JPL |
| 755858 | 2017 SS_{54} | — | February 8, 2008 | Kitt Peak | Spacewatch | · | 2.6 km | MPC · JPL |
| 755859 | 2017 SK_{60} | — | August 31, 2017 | Haleakala | Pan-STARRS 1 | · | 2.3 km | MPC · JPL |
| 755860 | 2017 SK_{68} | — | October 9, 2010 | Mount Lemmon | Mount Lemmon Survey | · | 770 m | MPC · JPL |
| 755861 | 2017 SN_{71} | — | April 19, 2006 | Kitt Peak | Spacewatch | · | 500 m | MPC · JPL |
| 755862 | 2017 SR_{73} | — | February 8, 2008 | Kitt Peak | Spacewatch | · | 3.0 km | MPC · JPL |
| 755863 | 2017 SC_{75} | — | August 16, 2017 | Haleakala | Pan-STARRS 1 | · | 2.6 km | MPC · JPL |
| 755864 | 2017 SV_{75} | — | November 20, 2014 | Mount Lemmon | Mount Lemmon Survey | · | 480 m | MPC · JPL |
| 755865 | 2017 SA_{76} | — | October 8, 2008 | Mount Lemmon | Mount Lemmon Survey | · | 1.5 km | MPC · JPL |
| 755866 | 2017 SJ_{76} | — | October 8, 2012 | Mount Lemmon | Mount Lemmon Survey | · | 1.8 km | MPC · JPL |
| 755867 | 2017 SL_{79} | — | January 28, 2011 | Mount Lemmon | Mount Lemmon Survey | · | 840 m | MPC · JPL |
| 755868 | 2017 SP_{82} | — | September 17, 2017 | Haleakala | Pan-STARRS 1 | · | 2.6 km | MPC · JPL |
| 755869 | 2017 SF_{85} | — | December 29, 2014 | Haleakala | Pan-STARRS 1 | (2076) | 580 m | MPC · JPL |
| 755870 | 2017 ST_{86} | — | September 15, 2007 | Kitt Peak | Spacewatch | · | 490 m | MPC · JPL |
| 755871 | 2017 SN_{89} | — | October 2, 2003 | Kitt Peak | Spacewatch | · | 570 m | MPC · JPL |
| 755872 | 2017 SZ_{89} | — | August 20, 2017 | Haleakala | Pan-STARRS 1 | T_{j} (2.98) | 2.6 km | MPC · JPL |
| 755873 | 2017 SE_{90} | — | August 24, 2017 | Haleakala | Pan-STARRS 1 | NYS | 660 m | MPC · JPL |
| 755874 | 2017 ST_{91} | — | February 27, 2015 | Haleakala | Pan-STARRS 1 | · | 770 m | MPC · JPL |
| 755875 | 2017 SH_{92} | — | August 12, 2013 | Kitt Peak | Spacewatch | NYS | 870 m | MPC · JPL |
| 755876 | 2017 SD_{100} | — | October 9, 2010 | Mount Lemmon | Mount Lemmon Survey | · | 690 m | MPC · JPL |
| 755877 | 2017 SQ_{103} | — | August 26, 2012 | Haleakala | Pan-STARRS 1 | · | 1.4 km | MPC · JPL |
| 755878 | 2017 SD_{104} | — | January 7, 2006 | Kitt Peak | Spacewatch | · | 1.1 km | MPC · JPL |
| 755879 | 2017 SB_{107} | — | July 30, 2017 | Haleakala | Pan-STARRS 1 | · | 3.1 km | MPC · JPL |
| 755880 | 2017 SP_{111} | — | October 6, 2012 | Haleakala | Pan-STARRS 1 | · | 2.1 km | MPC · JPL |
| 755881 | 2017 SV_{113} | — | August 8, 2016 | Haleakala | Pan-STARRS 1 | · | 2.2 km | MPC · JPL |
| 755882 | 2017 SF_{115} | — | September 19, 2006 | Anderson Mesa | LONEOS | · | 2.0 km | MPC · JPL |
| 755883 | 2017 SC_{125} | — | July 1, 2013 | Haleakala | Pan-STARRS 1 | · | 860 m | MPC · JPL |
| 755884 | 2017 SE_{126} | — | September 26, 2017 | Haleakala | Pan-STARRS 1 | · | 730 m | MPC · JPL |
| 755885 | 2017 SZ_{128} | — | September 26, 2006 | Kitt Peak | Spacewatch | · | 2.5 km | MPC · JPL |
| 755886 | 2017 SK_{131} | — | April 18, 2015 | Cerro Tololo | DECam | EOS | 1.5 km | MPC · JPL |
| 755887 | 2017 SL_{139} | — | September 19, 2017 | Haleakala | Pan-STARRS 1 | · | 1.4 km | MPC · JPL |
| 755888 | 2017 SP_{150} | — | September 18, 2017 | Haleakala | Pan-STARRS 1 | · | 500 m | MPC · JPL |
| 755889 | 2017 SR_{150} | — | September 23, 2017 | Haleakala | Pan-STARRS 1 | NYS | 700 m | MPC · JPL |
| 755890 | 2017 SO_{190} | — | October 23, 2012 | Mount Lemmon | Mount Lemmon Survey | · | 1.9 km | MPC · JPL |
| 755891 | 2017 SA_{195} | — | September 22, 2017 | Haleakala | Pan-STARRS 1 | · | 2.5 km | MPC · JPL |
| 755892 | 2017 SS_{198} | — | September 24, 2017 | Mount Lemmon | Mount Lemmon Survey | · | 910 m | MPC · JPL |
| 755893 | 2017 SQ_{200} | — | September 19, 2017 | Haleakala | Pan-STARRS 1 | EOS | 1.3 km | MPC · JPL |
| 755894 | 2017 SU_{203} | — | September 23, 2017 | Haleakala | Pan-STARRS 1 | · | 650 m | MPC · JPL |
| 755895 | 2017 SO_{204} | — | September 30, 2017 | Haleakala | Pan-STARRS 1 | · | 510 m | MPC · JPL |
| 755896 | 2017 SX_{205} | — | May 18, 2015 | Haleakala | Pan-STARRS 1 | · | 2.5 km | MPC · JPL |
| 755897 | 2017 SE_{218} | — | September 24, 2017 | Mount Lemmon | Mount Lemmon Survey | · | 2.8 km | MPC · JPL |
| 755898 | 2017 SN_{224} | — | September 22, 2017 | Haleakala | Pan-STARRS 1 | · | 2.6 km | MPC · JPL |
| 755899 | 2017 SE_{226} | — | April 18, 2015 | Cerro Tololo | DECam | EOS | 1.7 km | MPC · JPL |
| 755900 | 2017 SM_{258} | — | September 26, 2017 | Haleakala | Pan-STARRS 1 | 3:2 | 4.5 km | MPC · JPL |

== 755901–756000 ==
back to top

| Designation | | | Discovery | | | Properties | | Ref |
| Permanent | Provisional | Named after | Date | Site | Discoverer(s) | Category | Diam. | Ref |
|---|---|---|---|---|---|---|---|---|
| 755901 | 2017 TM_{3} | — | November 12, 2010 | Mount Lemmon | Mount Lemmon Survey | · | 850 m | MPC · JPL |
| 755902 | 2017 TV_{4} | — | October 12, 2017 | Haleakala | ATLAS | T_{j} (2.99) · APO · PHA | 550 m | MPC · JPL |
| 755903 | 2017 TZ_{6} | — | August 19, 2006 | Kitt Peak | Spacewatch | PHO | 650 m | MPC · JPL |
| 755904 | 2017 TG_{7} | — | June 14, 2010 | Mount Lemmon | Mount Lemmon Survey | · | 580 m | MPC · JPL |
| 755905 | 2017 TV_{7} | — | September 16, 2010 | Socorro | LINEAR | PHO | 680 m | MPC · JPL |
| 755906 | 2017 TX_{8} | — | December 4, 2007 | Catalina | CSS | · | 540 m | MPC · JPL |
| 755907 | 2017 TS_{11} | — | September 9, 2013 | Haleakala | Pan-STARRS 1 | PHO | 850 m | MPC · JPL |
| 755908 | 2017 TX_{11} | — | January 17, 2015 | Haleakala | Pan-STARRS 1 | · | 750 m | MPC · JPL |
| 755909 | 2017 TA_{13} | — | March 29, 2012 | Haleakala | Pan-STARRS 1 | · | 600 m | MPC · JPL |
| 755910 | 2017 TL_{19} | — | September 19, 2017 | Haleakala | Pan-STARRS 1 | · | 650 m | MPC · JPL |
| 755911 | 2017 TN_{20} | — | October 1, 2017 | Haleakala | Pan-STARRS 1 | · | 620 m | MPC · JPL |
| 755912 | 2017 TB_{25} | — | October 13, 2017 | Mount Lemmon | Mount Lemmon Survey | EOS | 1.4 km | MPC · JPL |
| 755913 | 2017 TW_{26} | — | October 15, 2017 | Mount Lemmon | Mount Lemmon Survey | · | 2.6 km | MPC · JPL |
| 755914 | 2017 TM_{27} | — | October 15, 2017 | Mount Lemmon | Mount Lemmon Survey | · | 570 m | MPC · JPL |
| 755915 | 2017 TO_{27} | — | October 13, 2017 | Mount Lemmon | Mount Lemmon Survey | (5651) | 2.9 km | MPC · JPL |
| 755916 | 2017 TK_{29} | — | September 16, 2017 | Haleakala | Pan-STARRS 1 | · | 790 m | MPC · JPL |
| 755917 | 2017 TR_{29} | — | August 31, 2017 | Haleakala | Pan-STARRS 1 | · | 790 m | MPC · JPL |
| 755918 | 2017 TJ_{31} | — | October 12, 2017 | Mount Lemmon | Mount Lemmon Survey | · | 890 m | MPC · JPL |
| 755919 | 2017 UY_{5} | — | October 23, 2017 | Mount Lemmon | Mount Lemmon Survey | APO · PHA | 620 m | MPC · JPL |
| 755920 | 2017 UJ_{14} | — | October 30, 2007 | Kitt Peak | Spacewatch | · | 620 m | MPC · JPL |
| 755921 | 2017 US_{14} | — | November 6, 2010 | Mount Lemmon | Mount Lemmon Survey | NYS | 780 m | MPC · JPL |
| 755922 Kinmen | 2017 UU_{14} | Kinmen | August 15, 2006 | Lulin | LUSS | · | 800 m | MPC · JPL |
| 755923 | 2017 UM_{17} | — | September 5, 2010 | Mount Lemmon | Mount Lemmon Survey | · | 530 m | MPC · JPL |
| 755924 | 2017 UT_{18} | — | September 6, 2008 | Mount Lemmon | Mount Lemmon Survey | · | 1.3 km | MPC · JPL |
| 755925 | 2017 UW_{18} | — | September 11, 2010 | Kitt Peak | Spacewatch | · | 630 m | MPC · JPL |
| 755926 | 2017 UF_{21} | — | October 20, 2003 | Kitt Peak | Spacewatch | V | 520 m | MPC · JPL |
| 755927 | 2017 UK_{21} | — | January 18, 2008 | Mount Lemmon | Mount Lemmon Survey | · | 670 m | MPC · JPL |
| 755928 | 2017 UF_{24} | — | September 29, 2010 | Mount Lemmon | Mount Lemmon Survey | · | 620 m | MPC · JPL |
| 755929 | 2017 UR_{24} | — | October 29, 2003 | Kitt Peak | Spacewatch | · | 700 m | MPC · JPL |
| 755930 | 2017 US_{29} | — | March 26, 2006 | Mount Lemmon | Mount Lemmon Survey | · | 1.7 km | MPC · JPL |
| 755931 | 2017 UT_{31} | — | April 7, 2013 | Mount Lemmon | Mount Lemmon Survey | · | 620 m | MPC · JPL |
| 755932 | 2017 UL_{33} | — | April 12, 2016 | Haleakala | Pan-STARRS 1 | · | 600 m | MPC · JPL |
| 755933 | 2017 UR_{34} | — | October 16, 2017 | Mount Lemmon | Mount Lemmon Survey | · | 1.4 km | MPC · JPL |
| 755934 | 2017 US_{36} | — | September 5, 2010 | Mount Lemmon | Mount Lemmon Survey | · | 510 m | MPC · JPL |
| 755935 | 2017 UA_{38} | — | September 9, 2007 | Kitt Peak | Spacewatch | · | 710 m | MPC · JPL |
| 755936 | 2017 UH_{42} | — | January 17, 2015 | Haleakala | Pan-STARRS 1 | · | 700 m | MPC · JPL |
| 755937 | 2017 UO_{83} | — | October 30, 2017 | Haleakala | Pan-STARRS 1 | · | 880 m | MPC · JPL |
| 755938 | 2017 UJ_{94} | — | October 27, 2017 | Mount Lemmon | Mount Lemmon Survey | · | 3.2 km | MPC · JPL |
| 755939 | 2017 UR_{96} | — | May 15, 2015 | Cerro Paranal | Gaia-GBOT | · | 1.9 km | MPC · JPL |
| 755940 | 2017 UU_{96} | — | October 30, 2017 | Haleakala | Pan-STARRS 1 | · | 2.2 km | MPC · JPL |
| 755941 | 2017 UM_{102} | — | October 28, 2017 | Haleakala | Pan-STARRS 1 | · | 840 m | MPC · JPL |
| 755942 | 2017 UX_{102} | — | April 18, 2015 | Cerro Tololo | DECam | · | 1.6 km | MPC · JPL |
| 755943 | 2017 UY_{120} | — | March 6, 2016 | Haleakala | Pan-STARRS 1 | · | 640 m | MPC · JPL |
| 755944 | 2017 UK_{122} | — | October 28, 2017 | Haleakala | Pan-STARRS 1 | · | 1.8 km | MPC · JPL |
| 755945 | 2017 UH_{123} | — | January 17, 2015 | Haleakala | Pan-STARRS 1 | · | 540 m | MPC · JPL |
| 755946 | 2017 VG | — | October 3, 2013 | Catalina | CSS | · | 1.1 km | MPC · JPL |
| 755947 | 2017 VE_{4} | — | October 30, 2010 | Mount Lemmon | Mount Lemmon Survey | · | 880 m | MPC · JPL |
| 755948 | 2017 VS_{5} | — | July 16, 2010 | WISE | WISE | · | 1.8 km | MPC · JPL |
| 755949 | 2017 VL_{6} | — | January 23, 2015 | Haleakala | Pan-STARRS 1 | · | 810 m | MPC · JPL |
| 755950 | 2017 VO_{10} | — | February 23, 2011 | Kitt Peak | Spacewatch | · | 990 m | MPC · JPL |
| 755951 | 2017 VW_{12} | — | January 30, 2015 | Haleakala | Pan-STARRS 1 | · | 880 m | MPC · JPL |
| 755952 | 2017 VS_{17} | — | July 9, 2016 | Haleakala | Pan-STARRS 1 | · | 2.3 km | MPC · JPL |
| 755953 | 2017 VU_{17} | — | November 10, 2010 | Mount Lemmon | Mount Lemmon Survey | · | 800 m | MPC · JPL |
| 755954 | 2017 VB_{26} | — | June 11, 2015 | Haleakala | Pan-STARRS 1 | · | 1.3 km | MPC · JPL |
| 755955 | 2017 VF_{33} | — | November 21, 2003 | Kitt Peak | Deep Ecliptic Survey | · | 600 m | MPC · JPL |
| 755956 | 2017 VK_{42} | — | November 13, 2017 | Haleakala | Pan-STARRS 1 | · | 460 m | MPC · JPL |
| 755957 | 2017 WV_{3} | — | October 20, 2007 | Mount Lemmon | Mount Lemmon Survey | · | 590 m | MPC · JPL |
| 755958 | 2017 WZ_{3} | — | September 1, 2013 | Mount Lemmon | Mount Lemmon Survey | · | 1.0 km | MPC · JPL |
| 755959 | 2017 WR_{5} | — | December 29, 2013 | Haleakala | Pan-STARRS 1 | · | 790 m | MPC · JPL |
| 755960 | 2017 WS_{6} | — | December 5, 2007 | Kitt Peak | Spacewatch | · | 530 m | MPC · JPL |
| 755961 | 2017 WG_{9} | — | January 13, 2005 | Catalina | CSS | JUN | 1.0 km | MPC · JPL |
| 755962 | 2017 WN_{10} | — | November 17, 2014 | Haleakala | Pan-STARRS 1 | · | 570 m | MPC · JPL |
| 755963 | 2017 WH_{14} | — | November 22, 2017 | Haleakala | Pan-STARRS 1 | APO +1km | 870 m | MPC · JPL |
| 755964 | 2017 WO_{17} | — | January 12, 2014 | Mount Lemmon | Mount Lemmon Survey | · | 1.8 km | MPC · JPL |
| 755965 | 2017 WP_{20} | — | November 14, 2007 | Kitt Peak | Spacewatch | · | 620 m | MPC · JPL |
| 755966 | 2017 WJ_{22} | — | January 21, 2015 | Haleakala | Pan-STARRS 1 | · | 790 m | MPC · JPL |
| 755967 | 2017 WP_{22} | — | November 17, 2006 | Mount Lemmon | Mount Lemmon Survey | · | 780 m | MPC · JPL |
| 755968 | 2017 WT_{22} | — | November 16, 2017 | Mount Lemmon | Mount Lemmon Survey | · | 720 m | MPC · JPL |
| 755969 | 2017 WH_{25} | — | August 17, 2012 | Tenerife | ESA OGS | · | 1.5 km | MPC · JPL |
| 755970 | 2017 WZ_{25} | — | January 28, 2014 | Mayhill-ISON | L. Elenin | · | 1.4 km | MPC · JPL |
| 755971 | 2017 WO_{27} | — | October 20, 2017 | Mount Lemmon | Mount Lemmon Survey | · | 740 m | MPC · JPL |
| 755972 | 2017 WL_{30} | — | November 20, 2017 | Haleakala | Pan-STARRS 1 | · | 1.5 km | MPC · JPL |
| 755973 | 2017 WN_{43} | — | November 26, 2017 | Mount Lemmon | Mount Lemmon Survey | · | 1.4 km | MPC · JPL |
| 755974 | 2017 WK_{44} | — | November 16, 2017 | Mount Lemmon | Mount Lemmon Survey | · | 1.1 km | MPC · JPL |
| 755975 | 2017 WM_{45} | — | May 20, 2015 | Cerro Tololo | DECam | · | 920 m | MPC · JPL |
| 755976 | 2017 WM_{48} | — | November 23, 2017 | Mount Lemmon | Mount Lemmon Survey | PHO | 660 m | MPC · JPL |
| 755977 | 2017 WP_{49} | — | November 21, 2017 | Mount Lemmon | Mount Lemmon Survey | T_{j} (2.92) | 4.8 km | MPC · JPL |
| 755978 | 2017 XK | — | March 25, 2011 | Kitt Peak | Spacewatch | · | 1.2 km | MPC · JPL |
| 755979 | 2017 XQ | — | January 3, 2013 | Haleakala | Pan-STARRS 1 | H | 530 m | MPC · JPL |
| 755980 | 2017 XL_{13} | — | January 21, 2015 | Haleakala | Pan-STARRS 1 | MAS | 480 m | MPC · JPL |
| 755981 | 2017 XM_{17} | — | September 25, 2012 | Mount Lemmon | Mount Lemmon Survey | · | 1.6 km | MPC · JPL |
| 755982 | 2017 XH_{18} | — | August 9, 2013 | Haleakala | Pan-STARRS 1 | · | 640 m | MPC · JPL |
| 755983 | 2017 XK_{18} | — | October 17, 2010 | Mount Lemmon | Mount Lemmon Survey | · | 590 m | MPC · JPL |
| 755984 | 2017 XJ_{23} | — | December 22, 2003 | Kitt Peak | Spacewatch | · | 780 m | MPC · JPL |
| 755985 | 2017 XR_{23} | — | March 19, 2009 | Kitt Peak | Spacewatch | · | 800 m | MPC · JPL |
| 755986 | 2017 XE_{24} | — | September 23, 2011 | Kitt Peak | Spacewatch | · | 2.6 km | MPC · JPL |
| 755987 | 2017 XQ_{25} | — | October 16, 2017 | Piszkéstető | K. Sárneczky | · | 770 m | MPC · JPL |
| 755988 | 2017 XP_{29} | — | July 6, 2016 | Haleakala | Pan-STARRS 1 | · | 1.0 km | MPC · JPL |
| 755989 | 2017 XP_{30} | — | September 30, 2003 | Kitt Peak | Spacewatch | · | 570 m | MPC · JPL |
| 755990 | 2017 XX_{39} | — | July 4, 2016 | Haleakala | Pan-STARRS 1 | · | 1.0 km | MPC · JPL |
| 755991 | 2017 XV_{41} | — | December 18, 2009 | Kitt Peak | Spacewatch | · | 970 m | MPC · JPL |
| 755992 | 2017 XY_{54} | — | April 25, 2015 | Haleakala | Pan-STARRS 1 | · | 900 m | MPC · JPL |
| 755993 | 2017 XS_{57} | — | August 15, 2013 | Haleakala | Pan-STARRS 1 | · | 730 m | MPC · JPL |
| 755994 | 2017 XC_{58} | — | August 3, 2017 | Haleakala | Pan-STARRS 1 | PHO | 760 m | MPC · JPL |
| 755995 | 2017 XY_{59} | — | April 1, 2011 | Mount Lemmon | Mount Lemmon Survey | · | 990 m | MPC · JPL |
| 755996 | 2017 XD_{63} | — | October 20, 2003 | Kitt Peak | Spacewatch | · | 1.5 km | MPC · JPL |
| 755997 | 2017 XT_{63} | — | December 13, 2017 | Mount Lemmon | Mount Lemmon Survey | · | 1.2 km | MPC · JPL |
| 755998 | 2017 XO_{66} | — | February 20, 2015 | Haleakala | Pan-STARRS 1 | PHO | 840 m | MPC · JPL |
| 755999 | 2017 XW_{72} | — | December 14, 2017 | Mount Lemmon | Mount Lemmon Survey | · | 1.1 km | MPC · JPL |
| 756000 | 2017 XF_{73} | — | December 14, 2017 | Mount Lemmon | Mount Lemmon Survey | · | 1.0 km | MPC · JPL |

back to top

== Meaning of names ==
As minor planet discoveries are confirmed, they are given a permanent number by the IAU's Minor Planet Center (MPC), and the discoverers can then submit names for them, following the IAU's naming conventions. The list below concerns those minor planets in the specified number-range that have received names, and explains the meanings of those names.

Official naming citations of newly named small Solar System bodies are approved and published in a bulletin by IAU's Working Group for Small Bodies Nomenclature (WGSBN). Before May 2021, citations were published in MPC's Minor Planet Circulars for many decades. Recent citations can also be found on the JPL Small-Body Database (SBDB). Until his death in 2016, German astronomer Lutz D. Schmadel compiled these citations into the Dictionary of Minor Planet Names (DMP) and regularly updated the collection.

Based on Paul Herget's The Names of the Minor Planets, Schmadel also researched the unclear origin of numerous asteroids, most of which had been named prior to World War II. This article incorporates text from this source, which is in the public domain: SBDB New namings may only be added to this list below after official publication as the preannouncement of names is condemned. The WGSBN publishes a comprehensive guideline for the naming rules of non-cometary small Solar System bodies.

| Named minor planet | Provisional | This minor planet was named for... | Ref · Catalog |
|---|---|---|---|
| 755002 Richer | 2016 WS_{14} | Michael G. Richer, Canadian astronomer. | IAU · 755002 |
| 755509 Juming | 2017 FK_{8} | Ju Ming, born in Tongxiao, Taiwan, was a master sculptor known for his Taichi and Living World series. | IAU · 755509 |
| 755922 Kinmen | 2017 UU_{14} | Kinmen National Park, Taiwan's first national park. | IAU · 755922 |
