= List of minor planets: 668001–669000 =

The following is a partial list of minor planets, running from minor-planet number 668001 through 669000, inclusive. The primary data for this and other partial lists is based on JPL's "Small-Body Orbital Elements" and data available from the Minor Planet Center. Critical list information is also provided by the MPC, unless otherwise specified from Lowell Observatory. A detailed description of the table's columns and additional sources are given on the main page including a complete list of every page in this series, and a statistical break-up on the dynamical classification of minor planets.

Also see the summary list of all named bodies in numerical and alphabetical order, and the corresponding naming citations for the number range of this particular list. New namings may only be added to this list after official publication, as the preannouncement of names is condemned by the Working Group for Small Bodies Nomenclature of the International Astronomical Union.

Near-Earth obj.	MBA (inner)	MBA (outer)	Centaur
Mars-crosser	MBA (middle)	Jupiter trojan	Trans-Neptunian obj.
Unclassified

== 668001–668100 ==
Designation			Discovery			Properties		Ref
Permanent	Provisional	Named after	Date	Site	Discoverer(s)	Category	Diam.	Ref
668001	2011 UV_{112}	—	October 18, 2011	Mount Lemmon	Mount Lemmon Survey	EOS	1.7 km	MPC · JPL
668002	2011 UV_{113}	—	October 21, 2011	Kitt Peak	Spacewatch	·	1.7 km	MPC · JPL
668003	2011 UJ_{115}	—	March 22, 2009	Mount Lemmon	Mount Lemmon Survey	·	1.5 km	MPC · JPL
668004	2011 UW_{115}	—	September 23, 2011	Kitt Peak	Spacewatch	·	1.9 km	MPC · JPL
668005	2011 UW_{117}	—	November 16, 2006	Mount Lemmon	Mount Lemmon Survey	EOS	1.4 km	MPC · JPL
668006	2011 UC_{119}	—	September 21, 2011	Kitt Peak	Spacewatch	·	800 m	MPC · JPL
668007	2011 UB_{120}	—	October 18, 2011	Mount Lemmon	Mount Lemmon Survey	·	2.6 km	MPC · JPL
668008	2011 UL_{122}	—	September 7, 2011	Kitt Peak	Spacewatch	·	540 m	MPC · JPL
668009	2011 UM_{123}	—	October 19, 2011	Mount Lemmon	Mount Lemmon Survey	·	1.7 km	MPC · JPL
668010	2011 UZ_{123}	—	November 18, 2006	Mount Lemmon	Mount Lemmon Survey	·	1.9 km	MPC · JPL
668011	2011 UK_{124}	—	September 12, 2007	Charleston	R. Holmes	·	1.3 km	MPC · JPL
668012	2011 US_{127}	—	October 20, 2011	Kitt Peak	Spacewatch	·	1.6 km	MPC · JPL
668013	2011 UZ_{127}	—	May 7, 2006	Mount Lemmon	Mount Lemmon Survey	PHO	960 m	MPC · JPL
668014	2011 UG_{128}	—	October 20, 2011	Haleakala	Pan-STARRS 1	EOS	1.6 km	MPC · JPL
668015	2011 UX_{128}	—	August 25, 2006	Siding Spring	SSS	EUN	1.4 km	MPC · JPL
668016	2011 US_{131}	—	September 24, 2011	Haleakala	Pan-STARRS 1	EOS	1.3 km	MPC · JPL
668017	2011 UJ_{132}	—	September 8, 2000	Kitt Peak	Spacewatch	·	2.0 km	MPC · JPL
668018	2011 UX_{132}	—	October 18, 2011	Mount Lemmon	Mount Lemmon Survey	·	2.5 km	MPC · JPL
668019	2011 UU_{135}	—	September 10, 2007	Mount Lemmon	Mount Lemmon Survey	·	870 m	MPC · JPL
668020	2011 UX_{135}	—	August 28, 2006	Catalina	CSS	AEO	1.1 km	MPC · JPL
668021	2011 UY_{135}	—	November 25, 2000	Kitt Peak	Spacewatch	·	880 m	MPC · JPL
668022	2011 UC_{138}	—	September 1, 2005	Kitt Peak	Spacewatch	·	2.3 km	MPC · JPL
668023	2011 UD_{138}	—	October 21, 2011	Mount Lemmon	Mount Lemmon Survey	·	920 m	MPC · JPL
668024	2011 UX_{142}	—	October 23, 2011	Kitt Peak	Spacewatch	·	1.2 km	MPC · JPL
668025	2011 UD_{143}	—	October 23, 2011	Haleakala	Pan-STARRS 1	·	1.7 km	MPC · JPL
668026	2011 UM_{143}	—	October 23, 2011	Haleakala	Pan-STARRS 1	EOS	1.6 km	MPC · JPL
668027	2011 UD_{144}	—	October 24, 2011	Kitt Peak	Spacewatch	·	1.8 km	MPC · JPL
668028	2011 UT_{146}	—	July 30, 2001	Palomar	NEAT	·	2.4 km	MPC · JPL
668029	2011 UK_{151}	—	October 25, 2011	Haleakala	Pan-STARRS 1	V	640 m	MPC · JPL
668030	2011 UL_{151}	—	October 25, 2011	Haleakala	Pan-STARRS 1	·	2.1 km	MPC · JPL
668031	2011 UN_{151}	—	October 22, 2011	Sandlot	G. Hug	·	1.2 km	MPC · JPL
668032	2011 UU_{153}	—	October 23, 2011	Haleakala	Pan-STARRS 1	·	2.5 km	MPC · JPL
668033	2011 UB_{154}	—	November 15, 2006	Mount Lemmon	Mount Lemmon Survey	TIR	2.2 km	MPC · JPL
668034	2011 UK_{154}	—	October 23, 2011	Haleakala	Pan-STARRS 1	·	2.2 km	MPC · JPL
668035	2011 UG_{157}	—	September 27, 2011	Mount Lemmon	Mount Lemmon Survey	·	950 m	MPC · JPL
668036	2011 UL_{157}	—	October 19, 2011	Mount Lemmon	Mount Lemmon Survey	·	2.0 km	MPC · JPL
668037	2011 UG_{160}	—	October 26, 2011	Haleakala	Pan-STARRS 1	H	530 m	MPC · JPL
668038	2011 UE_{162}	—	January 18, 2008	Mount Lemmon	Mount Lemmon Survey	·	1.8 km	MPC · JPL
668039	2011 UN_{162}	—	November 11, 2007	Mount Lemmon	Mount Lemmon Survey	·	2.0 km	MPC · JPL
668040	2011 UW_{164}	—	November 23, 2008	Mount Lemmon	Mount Lemmon Survey	·	1.3 km	MPC · JPL
668041	2011 UY_{164}	—	October 26, 2011	Mayhill-ISON	L. Elenin	GEF	1.3 km	MPC · JPL
668042	2011 UW_{165}	—	March 19, 2009	Kitt Peak	Spacewatch	NEM	2.4 km	MPC · JPL
668043	2011 UJ_{171}	—	September 21, 2011	Catalina	CSS	·	2.4 km	MPC · JPL
668044	2011 UO_{171}	—	November 2, 2006	Mount Lemmon	Mount Lemmon Survey	·	1.9 km	MPC · JPL
668045	2011 UN_{172}	—	October 21, 2011	Zelenchukskaya Stn	T. V. Krjačko, Satovski, B.	·	1.8 km	MPC · JPL
668046	2011 UH_{174}	—	December 10, 2002	Palomar	NEAT	·	2.3 km	MPC · JPL
668047	2011 UG_{175}	—	August 24, 2007	Kitt Peak	Spacewatch	·	970 m	MPC · JPL
668048	2011 UL_{178}	—	September 27, 2011	Mount Lemmon	Mount Lemmon Survey	H	400 m	MPC · JPL
668049	2011 UG_{180}	—	October 20, 2011	Kitt Peak	Spacewatch	·	530 m	MPC · JPL
668050	2011 UH_{184}	—	October 25, 2011	Haleakala	Pan-STARRS 1	·	2.6 km	MPC · JPL
668051	2011 UV_{184}	—	September 10, 2007	Mount Lemmon	Mount Lemmon Survey	·	910 m	MPC · JPL
668052	2011 UC_{186}	—	November 11, 2002	Socorro	LINEAR	·	2.2 km	MPC · JPL
668053	2011 UY_{187}	—	August 16, 2006	Siding Spring	SSS	NEM	2.6 km	MPC · JPL
668054	2011 UQ_{188}	—	August 31, 2005	Kitt Peak	Spacewatch	·	2.2 km	MPC · JPL
668055	2011 UD_{189}	—	March 4, 2005	Mount Lemmon	Mount Lemmon Survey	·	1.4 km	MPC · JPL
668056	2011 UM_{190}	—	October 23, 2011	Mount Lemmon	Mount Lemmon Survey	·	2.1 km	MPC · JPL
668057	2011 UG_{194}	—	October 20, 2011	Mount Lemmon	Mount Lemmon Survey	·	930 m	MPC · JPL
668058	2011 UV_{194}	—	October 5, 2011	Haleakala	Pan-STARRS 1	·	960 m	MPC · JPL
668059	2011 UD_{196}	—	September 26, 2002	Palomar	NEAT	·	1.8 km	MPC · JPL
668060	2011 UJ_{198}	—	October 21, 2011	Kitt Peak	Spacewatch	·	2.2 km	MPC · JPL
668061	2011 UA_{201}	—	October 25, 2011	XuYi	PMO NEO Survey Program	·	2.3 km	MPC · JPL
668062	2011 UM_{204}	—	October 26, 2011	Haleakala	Pan-STARRS 1	·	960 m	MPC · JPL
668063	2011 UH_{208}	—	September 12, 2016	Mount Lemmon	Mount Lemmon Survey	·	1.8 km	MPC · JPL
668064	2011 UL_{208}	—	October 24, 2011	Mount Lemmon	Mount Lemmon Survey	EOS	1.4 km	MPC · JPL
668065	2011 UK_{209}	—	April 7, 2005	Mount Lemmon	Mount Lemmon Survey	EUN	1.1 km	MPC · JPL
668066	2011 UR_{210}	—	October 24, 2011	Mount Lemmon	Mount Lemmon Survey	DOR	2.2 km	MPC · JPL
668067	2011 UK_{211}	—	October 16, 2007	Mount Lemmon	Mount Lemmon Survey	·	1.3 km	MPC · JPL
668068	2011 UV_{213}	—	September 23, 2011	Kitt Peak	Spacewatch	HYG	1.9 km	MPC · JPL
668069	2011 UA_{214}	—	October 24, 2011	Mount Lemmon	Mount Lemmon Survey	·	550 m	MPC · JPL
668070	2011 UK_{214}	—	September 23, 2011	Kitt Peak	Spacewatch	EUP	2.6 km	MPC · JPL
668071	2011 UQ_{219}	—	October 24, 2011	Mount Lemmon	Mount Lemmon Survey	·	790 m	MPC · JPL
668072	2011 UO_{221}	—	October 23, 2006	Kitt Peak	Spacewatch	EOS	1.4 km	MPC · JPL
668073	2011 UC_{222}	—	March 2, 2009	Mount Lemmon	Mount Lemmon Survey	ADE	2.1 km	MPC · JPL
668074	2011 UM_{223}	—	September 21, 2011	Kitt Peak	Spacewatch	MAS	590 m	MPC · JPL
668075	2011 UO_{223}	—	August 17, 2006	Palomar	NEAT	·	2.1 km	MPC · JPL
668076	2011 UY_{228}	—	October 24, 2011	Mount Lemmon	Mount Lemmon Survey	·	830 m	MPC · JPL
668077	2011 UM_{235}	—	October 24, 2011	Haleakala	Pan-STARRS 1	LIX	2.1 km	MPC · JPL
668078	2011 UT_{236}	—	October 24, 2011	Haleakala	Pan-STARRS 1	EOS	1.5 km	MPC · JPL
668079	2011 UZ_{242}	—	September 28, 2006	Kitt Peak	Spacewatch	HOF	2.3 km	MPC · JPL
668080	2011 UK_{244}	—	March 13, 2005	Kitt Peak	Spacewatch	·	830 m	MPC · JPL
668081	2011 UX_{244}	—	October 18, 2011	Kitt Peak	Spacewatch	·	1.0 km	MPC · JPL
668082	2011 UG_{245}	—	September 23, 2011	Kitt Peak	Spacewatch	·	790 m	MPC · JPL
668083	2011 UL_{248}	—	September 26, 2006	Catalina	CSS	·	2.2 km	MPC · JPL
668084	2011 UF_{250}	—	January 1, 2008	Kitt Peak	Spacewatch	·	1.9 km	MPC · JPL
668085	2011 UH_{251}	—	October 4, 2006	Mount Lemmon	Mount Lemmon Survey	·	2.0 km	MPC · JPL
668086	2011 US_{252}	—	May 5, 2008	Mount Lemmon	Mount Lemmon Survey	·	2.4 km	MPC · JPL
668087	2011 UX_{253}	—	October 26, 2011	Bergisch Gladbach	W. Bickel	V	460 m	MPC · JPL
668088	2011 UG_{255}	—	September 21, 2011	Kitt Peak	Spacewatch	THM	1.9 km	MPC · JPL
668089	2011 UP_{255}	—	October 29, 2011	Kitt Peak	Spacewatch	EUP	2.6 km	MPC · JPL
668090	2011 UX_{257}	—	October 24, 2011	Haleakala	Pan-STARRS 1	·	2.0 km	MPC · JPL
668091	2011 UR_{258}	—	October 23, 2011	Sandlot	G. Hug	·	2.1 km	MPC · JPL
668092	2011 UM_{262}	—	September 24, 2011	Mount Lemmon	Mount Lemmon Survey	·	2.0 km	MPC · JPL
668093	2011 UZ_{265}	—	October 21, 2011	Mount Lemmon	Mount Lemmon Survey	·	2.1 km	MPC · JPL
668094	2011 UQ_{266}	—	September 24, 2011	Haleakala	Pan-STARRS 1	·	1.7 km	MPC · JPL
668095	2011 UU_{266}	—	October 26, 2011	Haleakala	Pan-STARRS 1	·	2.4 km	MPC · JPL
668096	2011 UJ_{267}	—	September 28, 2011	Kitt Peak	Spacewatch	·	1.6 km	MPC · JPL
668097	2011 UN_{267}	—	October 19, 2011	Kitt Peak	Spacewatch	·	2.5 km	MPC · JPL
668098	2011 UQ_{268}	—	July 21, 2006	Mount Lemmon	Mount Lemmon Survey	·	1.5 km	MPC · JPL
668099	2011 UE_{270}	—	October 29, 2011	Haleakala	Pan-STARRS 1	EOS	1.6 km	MPC · JPL
668100	2011 UV_{270}	—	October 5, 2002	Palomar	NEAT	·	1.9 km	MPC · JPL

== 668101–668200 ==
back to top

Designation			Discovery			Properties		Ref
Permanent	Provisional	Named after	Date	Site	Discoverer(s)	Category	Diam.	Ref
668101	2011 UX_{272}	—	October 30, 2011	Mount Lemmon	Mount Lemmon Survey	EOS	1.9 km	MPC · JPL
668102	2011 UY_{272}	—	October 18, 2011	Kitt Peak	Spacewatch	·	2.2 km	MPC · JPL
668103	2011 UB_{275}	—	October 19, 2011	Kitt Peak	Spacewatch	·	880 m	MPC · JPL
668104	2011 UA_{277}	—	October 11, 2007	Mount Lemmon	Mount Lemmon Survey	·	850 m	MPC · JPL
668105	2011 UG_{279}	—	October 25, 2011	Haleakala	Pan-STARRS 1	·	2.2 km	MPC · JPL
668106	2011 UY_{279}	—	September 12, 2007	Mount Lemmon	Mount Lemmon Survey	·	980 m	MPC · JPL
668107	2011 UQ_{281}	—	October 28, 2011	Kitt Peak	Spacewatch	V	530 m	MPC · JPL
668108	2011 UE_{285}	—	September 30, 2011	Les Engarouines	L. Bernasconi	NEM	2.2 km	MPC · JPL
668109	2011 UE_{286}	—	October 11, 2002	Palomar	NEAT	·	1.9 km	MPC · JPL
668110	2011 UQ_{286}	—	October 31, 2011	Mount Lemmon	Mount Lemmon Survey	·	2.5 km	MPC · JPL
668111	2011 UJ_{287}	—	November 4, 2007	Kitt Peak	Spacewatch	·	590 m	MPC · JPL
668112	2011 UZ_{287}	—	October 5, 2011	La Sagra	OAM	·	2.6 km	MPC · JPL
668113	2011 UR_{288}	—	October 28, 2011	Mount Lemmon	Mount Lemmon Survey	·	2.3 km	MPC · JPL
668114	2011 UU_{289}	—	October 29, 2011	Haleakala	Pan-STARRS 1	·	2.3 km	MPC · JPL
668115	2011 UR_{293}	—	May 14, 2005	Mount Lemmon	Mount Lemmon Survey	·	1.9 km	MPC · JPL
668116	2011 UN_{296}	—	October 17, 2011	Kitt Peak	Spacewatch	TIR	2.2 km	MPC · JPL
668117	2011 UN_{297}	—	August 10, 2007	Kitt Peak	Spacewatch	MAS	620 m	MPC · JPL
668118	2011 UB_{300}	—	October 21, 2011	Mount Lemmon	Mount Lemmon Survey	NYS	890 m	MPC · JPL
668119	2011 UE_{300}	—	October 29, 2011	Kitt Peak	Spacewatch	·	860 m	MPC · JPL
668120	2011 UU_{302}	—	September 29, 2011	Kitt Peak	Spacewatch	V	470 m	MPC · JPL
668121	2011 UL_{307}	—	October 27, 2011	Catalina	CSS	(5)	930 m	MPC · JPL
668122	2011 UC_{310}	—	September 25, 2011	Haleakala	Pan-STARRS 1	·	2.4 km	MPC · JPL
668123	2011 UG_{310}	—	October 23, 1997	Kitt Peak	Spacewatch	·	1.6 km	MPC · JPL
668124	2011 UL_{311}	—	September 23, 2011	Kitt Peak	Spacewatch	·	2.4 km	MPC · JPL
668125	2011 UO_{312}	—	October 30, 2011	Kitt Peak	Spacewatch	·	1.8 km	MPC · JPL
668126	2011 UY_{312}	—	October 22, 2011	Kitt Peak	Spacewatch	THM	1.9 km	MPC · JPL
668127	2011 UR_{313}	—	October 29, 2011	Haleakala	Pan-STARRS 1	·	1.7 km	MPC · JPL
668128	2011 UK_{321}	—	October 31, 2011	Mayhill-ISON	L. Elenin	·	1.7 km	MPC · JPL
668129	2011 UL_{321}	—	October 5, 2011	Piszkéstető	K. Sárneczky	·	2.0 km	MPC · JPL
668130	2011 UZ_{324}	—	September 28, 2006	Catalina	CSS	GEF	1.4 km	MPC · JPL
668131	2011 UR_{325}	—	September 28, 2011	Mount Lemmon	Mount Lemmon Survey	·	1.8 km	MPC · JPL
668132	2011 UK_{327}	—	September 20, 2011	Kitt Peak	Spacewatch	·	1.1 km	MPC · JPL
668133	2011 UR_{328}	—	October 2, 2006	Mount Lemmon	Mount Lemmon Survey	·	1.7 km	MPC · JPL
668134	2011 UH_{329}	—	October 23, 2011	Haleakala	Pan-STARRS 1	·	2.2 km	MPC · JPL
668135	2011 UW_{330}	—	October 20, 2011	Kitt Peak	Spacewatch	EOS	1.7 km	MPC · JPL
668136	2011 UF_{331}	—	October 24, 2011	Kitt Peak	Spacewatch	·	840 m	MPC · JPL
668137	2011 UJ_{331}	—	October 24, 2011	Haleakala	Pan-STARRS 1	·	2.0 km	MPC · JPL
668138	2011 UM_{331}	—	July 12, 2005	Mount Lemmon	Mount Lemmon Survey	·	2.8 km	MPC · JPL
668139	2011 UM_{332}	—	November 3, 2007	Mount Lemmon	Mount Lemmon Survey	·	1.5 km	MPC · JPL
668140	2011 UX_{337}	—	September 21, 2011	Kitt Peak	Spacewatch	·	850 m	MPC · JPL
668141	2011 UD_{338}	—	September 21, 2011	Kitt Peak	Spacewatch	NYS	820 m	MPC · JPL
668142	2011 UT_{340}	—	March 21, 2009	Kitt Peak	Spacewatch	EOS	1.5 km	MPC · JPL
668143	2011 UX_{341}	—	October 23, 2006	Kitt Peak	Spacewatch	EOS	1.6 km	MPC · JPL
668144	2011 UA_{342}	—	August 18, 2006	Kitt Peak	Spacewatch	·	1.9 km	MPC · JPL
668145	2011 UZ_{342}	—	October 18, 2011	Mount Lemmon	Mount Lemmon Survey	LIX	2.7 km	MPC · JPL
668146	2011 UD_{348}	—	November 19, 2006	Kitt Peak	Spacewatch	·	1.6 km	MPC · JPL
668147	2011 UD_{349}	—	September 23, 2011	Haleakala	Pan-STARRS 1	·	2.1 km	MPC · JPL
668148	2011 UO_{352}	—	October 3, 2011	XuYi	PMO NEO Survey Program	·	560 m	MPC · JPL
668149	2011 UL_{353}	—	November 3, 2007	Kitt Peak	Spacewatch	·	700 m	MPC · JPL
668150	2011 UK_{356}	—	October 20, 2011	Mount Lemmon	Mount Lemmon Survey	·	2.5 km	MPC · JPL
668151	2011 UG_{357}	—	September 20, 2011	Kitt Peak	Spacewatch	NYS	1.0 km	MPC · JPL
668152	2011 UT_{359}	—	October 20, 2011	Mount Lemmon	Mount Lemmon Survey	EUP	2.7 km	MPC · JPL
668153	2011 UH_{366}	—	September 29, 2011	Kitt Peak	Spacewatch	·	1.8 km	MPC · JPL
668154	2011 UP_{366}	—	September 29, 2011	Kitt Peak	Spacewatch	·	970 m	MPC · JPL
668155	2011 UR_{366}	—	November 7, 2007	Kitt Peak	Spacewatch	·	1.5 km	MPC · JPL
668156	2011 UF_{373}	—	September 20, 2011	Kitt Peak	Spacewatch	·	2.2 km	MPC · JPL
668157	2011 UL_{375}	—	October 23, 2011	Mount Lemmon	Mount Lemmon Survey	·	2.3 km	MPC · JPL
668158	2011 UG_{376}	—	October 2, 2006	Mount Lemmon	Mount Lemmon Survey	·	1.8 km	MPC · JPL
668159	2011 UE_{380}	—	September 18, 2006	Anderson Mesa	LONEOS	·	2.7 km	MPC · JPL
668160	2011 UE_{383}	—	September 29, 2011	Mount Lemmon	Mount Lemmon Survey	·	1.8 km	MPC · JPL
668161	2011 UM_{383}	—	November 3, 2007	Mount Lemmon	Mount Lemmon Survey	·	1.7 km	MPC · JPL
668162	2011 UO_{383}	—	October 24, 2011	Haleakala	Pan-STARRS 1	·	1.6 km	MPC · JPL
668163	2011 UF_{384}	—	October 24, 2011	Haleakala	Pan-STARRS 1	·	2.1 km	MPC · JPL
668164	2011 UE_{385}	—	October 24, 2011	Catalina	CSS	LIX	2.3 km	MPC · JPL
668165	2011 UF_{387}	—	October 25, 2011	Haleakala	Pan-STARRS 1	EOS	1.5 km	MPC · JPL
668166	2011 UV_{388}	—	October 25, 2011	Haleakala	Pan-STARRS 1	·	2.4 km	MPC · JPL
668167	2011 UE_{389}	—	October 25, 2011	XuYi	PMO NEO Survey Program	·	2.4 km	MPC · JPL
668168	2011 US_{393}	—	February 26, 2009	Kitt Peak	Spacewatch	·	2.2 km	MPC · JPL
668169	2011 US_{395}	—	October 26, 2000	Kitt Peak	Spacewatch	TIR	2.2 km	MPC · JPL
668170	2011 UH_{396}	—	November 19, 2006	Catalina	CSS	·	1.6 km	MPC · JPL
668171	2011 UJ_{401}	—	October 19, 2011	Kitt Peak	Spacewatch	·	2.7 km	MPC · JPL
668172	2011 UQ_{401}	—	February 9, 2002	Palomar	NEAT	TIR	4.1 km	MPC · JPL
668173	2011 UZ_{401}	—	October 26, 2011	Moletai	K. Černis, Zdanavicius, J.	·	2.2 km	MPC · JPL
668174	2011 UV_{403}	—	October 29, 2011	Kitt Peak	Spacewatch	·	2.1 km	MPC · JPL
668175	2011 UK_{404}	—	October 21, 2011	Mount Lemmon	Mount Lemmon Survey	·	2.3 km	MPC · JPL
668176	2011 UN_{404}	—	October 30, 2011	Kitt Peak	Spacewatch	·	1.5 km	MPC · JPL
668177	2011 UX_{405}	—	October 20, 2011	Palomar	Palomar Transient Factory	·	770 m	MPC · JPL
668178	2011 UA_{414}	—	October 26, 2011	Haleakala	Pan-STARRS 1	MAS	540 m	MPC · JPL
668179	2011 UX_{415}	—	October 20, 2011	Mount Lemmon	Mount Lemmon Survey	·	760 m	MPC · JPL
668180	2011 UH_{417}	—	October 25, 2011	Haleakala	Pan-STARRS 1	·	1.9 km	MPC · JPL
668181	2011 UD_{418}	—	October 26, 2011	Haleakala	Pan-STARRS 1	·	1.6 km	MPC · JPL
668182	2011 UE_{420}	—	October 1, 2011	Kitt Peak	Spacewatch	EOS	1.4 km	MPC · JPL
668183	2011 UH_{420}	—	October 19, 2011	Catalina	CSS	T_{j} (2.99) · EUP	3.0 km	MPC · JPL
668184	2011 UF_{421}	—	October 18, 2011	Haleakala	Pan-STARRS 1	T_{j} (2.94)	3.3 km	MPC · JPL
668185	2011 UK_{421}	—	October 23, 2011	Haleakala	Pan-STARRS 1	·	2.1 km	MPC · JPL
668186	2011 UP_{421}	—	October 23, 2011	Mount Lemmon	Mount Lemmon Survey	·	2.2 km	MPC · JPL
668187	2011 UU_{421}	—	October 26, 2011	Haleakala	Pan-STARRS 1	·	1.0 km	MPC · JPL
668188	2011 UZ_{421}	—	May 21, 2015	Haleakala	Pan-STARRS 1	·	2.4 km	MPC · JPL
668189	2011 UC_{422}	—	January 20, 2013	Kitt Peak	Spacewatch	·	1.8 km	MPC · JPL
668190	2011 UQ_{422}	—	October 26, 2011	Haleakala	Pan-STARRS 1	·	990 m	MPC · JPL
668191	2011 US_{422}	—	August 8, 2016	Haleakala	Pan-STARRS 1	·	2.6 km	MPC · JPL
668192	2011 UV_{422}	—	May 6, 2014	Haleakala	Pan-STARRS 1	·	2.4 km	MPC · JPL
668193	2011 UB_{423}	—	October 24, 2011	Haleakala	Pan-STARRS 1	·	2.2 km	MPC · JPL
668194	2011 UB_{425}	—	April 4, 2014	Haleakala	Pan-STARRS 1	·	1.7 km	MPC · JPL
668195	2011 UN_{425}	—	October 21, 2011	Kitt Peak	Spacewatch	HYG	2.2 km	MPC · JPL
668196	2011 US_{425}	—	October 22, 2011	Kitt Peak	Spacewatch	THM	1.5 km	MPC · JPL
668197	2011 UX_{426}	—	October 17, 2011	Piszkés-tető	K. Sárneczky, A. Szing	·	2.6 km	MPC · JPL
668198	2011 UO_{427}	—	October 19, 2011	Catalina	CSS	T_{j} (2.96)	3.4 km	MPC · JPL
668199	2011 UU_{427}	—	October 18, 2011	Mount Lemmon	Mount Lemmon Survey	·	2.1 km	MPC · JPL
668200	2011 UD_{428}	—	October 25, 2011	Haleakala	Pan-STARRS 1	·	2.3 km	MPC · JPL

== 668201–668300 ==
back to top

Designation			Discovery			Properties		Ref
Permanent	Provisional	Named after	Date	Site	Discoverer(s)	Category	Diam.	Ref
668201	2011 UE_{428}	—	October 25, 2011	Haleakala	Pan-STARRS 1	·	970 m	MPC · JPL
668202	2011 UG_{428}	—	March 16, 2005	Mount Lemmon	Mount Lemmon Survey	·	890 m	MPC · JPL
668203	2011 UW_{428}	—	October 23, 2011	Haleakala	Pan-STARRS 1	·	1.3 km	MPC · JPL
668204	2011 UY_{430}	—	October 27, 2011	Mount Lemmon	Mount Lemmon Survey	HYG	2.0 km	MPC · JPL
668205	2011 UV_{433}	—	August 21, 2015	Haleakala	Pan-STARRS 1	·	770 m	MPC · JPL
668206	2011 UH_{435}	—	February 5, 2013	Kitt Peak	Spacewatch	·	1.7 km	MPC · JPL
668207	2011 UK_{436}	—	October 11, 2016	Mount Lemmon	Mount Lemmon Survey	EOS	1.5 km	MPC · JPL
668208	2011 UB_{437}	—	October 25, 2011	Haleakala	Pan-STARRS 1	·	820 m	MPC · JPL
668209	2011 UY_{438}	—	April 30, 2014	Haleakala	Pan-STARRS 1	·	2.1 km	MPC · JPL
668210	2011 UB_{439}	—	October 25, 2011	Haleakala	Pan-STARRS 1	·	720 m	MPC · JPL
668211	2011 UH_{439}	—	October 23, 2011	Haleakala	Pan-STARRS 1	V	490 m	MPC · JPL
668212	2011 UL_{441}	—	October 26, 2011	Haleakala	Pan-STARRS 1	·	1.9 km	MPC · JPL
668213	2011 UN_{441}	—	December 9, 2015	Mount Lemmon	Mount Lemmon Survey	·	930 m	MPC · JPL
668214	2011 UR_{441}	—	October 28, 2011	Mount Lemmon	Mount Lemmon Survey	·	590 m	MPC · JPL
668215	2011 UZ_{442}	—	October 24, 2011	Haleakala	Pan-STARRS 1	EOS	1.1 km	MPC · JPL
668216	2011 UH_{443}	—	October 20, 2011	Mount Lemmon	Mount Lemmon Survey	·	1.4 km	MPC · JPL
668217	2011 UC_{444}	—	January 17, 2013	Mount Lemmon	Mount Lemmon Survey	EOS	1.6 km	MPC · JPL
668218	2011 UX_{444}	—	October 20, 2011	Mount Lemmon	Mount Lemmon Survey	·	1.1 km	MPC · JPL
668219	2011 UJ_{445}	—	August 2, 2016	Haleakala	Pan-STARRS 1	·	2.1 km	MPC · JPL
668220	2011 UB_{447}	—	October 18, 2011	Kitt Peak	Spacewatch	·	1.7 km	MPC · JPL
668221	2011 UM_{447}	—	October 20, 2011	Kitt Peak	Spacewatch	EOS	1.4 km	MPC · JPL
668222	2011 UA_{449}	—	October 24, 2011	Haleakala	Pan-STARRS 1	EOS	1.5 km	MPC · JPL
668223	2011 UK_{449}	—	October 30, 2011	Kitt Peak	Spacewatch	EOS	1.5 km	MPC · JPL
668224	2011 UQ_{449}	—	October 18, 2011	Mount Lemmon	Mount Lemmon Survey	V	550 m	MPC · JPL
668225	2011 UC_{450}	—	October 30, 2011	Catalina	CSS	PHO	790 m	MPC · JPL
668226	2011 UC_{451}	—	October 25, 2011	Haleakala	Pan-STARRS 1	·	2.1 km	MPC · JPL
668227	2011 UJ_{451}	—	October 20, 2011	Mount Lemmon	Mount Lemmon Survey	·	1.6 km	MPC · JPL
668228	2011 UB_{453}	—	October 26, 2011	Haleakala	Pan-STARRS 1	·	1.9 km	MPC · JPL
668229	2011 UN_{453}	—	October 25, 2011	Haleakala	Pan-STARRS 1	·	2.6 km	MPC · JPL
668230	2011 UO_{453}	—	October 23, 2011	Haleakala	Pan-STARRS 1	·	2.2 km	MPC · JPL
668231	2011 UA_{454}	—	October 25, 2011	Haleakala	Pan-STARRS 1	·	2.4 km	MPC · JPL
668232	2011 UM_{454}	—	October 24, 2011	Haleakala	Pan-STARRS 1	·	2.0 km	MPC · JPL
668233	2011 UA_{455}	—	October 31, 2011	Catalina	CSS	·	2.2 km	MPC · JPL
668234	2011 UZ_{455}	—	October 26, 2011	Haleakala	Pan-STARRS 1	·	940 m	MPC · JPL
668235	2011 UD_{456}	—	October 28, 2011	Mount Lemmon	Mount Lemmon Survey	·	1.7 km	MPC · JPL
668236	2011 UK_{456}	—	October 27, 2011	Mount Lemmon	Mount Lemmon Survey	·	2.4 km	MPC · JPL
668237	2011 UZ_{456}	—	October 26, 2011	Haleakala	Pan-STARRS 1	·	1.7 km	MPC · JPL
668238	2011 US_{462}	—	October 26, 2011	Haleakala	Pan-STARRS 1	EOS	1.5 km	MPC · JPL
668239	2011 UN_{463}	—	October 23, 2011	Haleakala	Pan-STARRS 1	·	2.1 km	MPC · JPL
668240	2011 UF_{471}	—	October 19, 2011	Mount Lemmon	Mount Lemmon Survey	·	950 m	MPC · JPL
668241	2011 UF_{474}	—	October 23, 2011	Haleakala	Pan-STARRS 1	·	2.4 km	MPC · JPL
668242	2011 UT_{474}	—	October 19, 2011	Kitt Peak	Spacewatch	·	2.2 km	MPC · JPL
668243	2011 UK_{475}	—	October 23, 2011	Haleakala	Pan-STARRS 1	·	2.3 km	MPC · JPL
668244	2011 UT_{475}	—	October 22, 2011	Kitt Peak	Spacewatch	·	2.6 km	MPC · JPL
668245	2011 UY_{475}	—	October 25, 2011	Haleakala	Pan-STARRS 1	·	570 m	MPC · JPL
668246	2011 UP_{476}	—	October 26, 2011	Haleakala	Pan-STARRS 1	VER	2.0 km	MPC · JPL
668247	2011 UW_{476}	—	October 25, 2011	Haleakala	Pan-STARRS 1	·	2.4 km	MPC · JPL
668248	2011 UU_{483}	—	October 26, 2011	Haleakala	Pan-STARRS 1	·	1.7 km	MPC · JPL
668249	2011 UD_{487}	—	October 24, 2011	Haleakala	Pan-STARRS 1	·	2.4 km	MPC · JPL
668250	2011 UT_{489}	—	October 26, 2011	Haleakala	Pan-STARRS 1	·	2.3 km	MPC · JPL
668251	2011 UJ_{496}	—	October 26, 2011	Haleakala	Pan-STARRS 1	VER	2.1 km	MPC · JPL
668252	2011 UX_{496}	—	October 21, 2011	Kitt Peak	Spacewatch	·	2.0 km	MPC · JPL
668253	2011 VO	—	October 24, 2011	Kitt Peak	Spacewatch	·	1.6 km	MPC · JPL
668254	2011 VJ_{3}	—	November 1, 2011	Kitt Peak	Spacewatch	·	2.3 km	MPC · JPL
668255	2011 VP_{3}	—	October 6, 2011	Mount Lemmon	Mount Lemmon Survey	·	2.3 km	MPC · JPL
668256	2011 VL_{6}	—	November 2, 2011	Mount Lemmon	Mount Lemmon Survey	THB	1.9 km	MPC · JPL
668257	2011 VO_{8}	—	September 21, 2011	Kitt Peak	Spacewatch	·	1.9 km	MPC · JPL
668258	2011 VY_{8}	—	September 21, 2011	Kitt Peak	Spacewatch	·	1.9 km	MPC · JPL
668259	2011 VQ_{9}	—	February 10, 2008	Mount Lemmon	Mount Lemmon Survey	EOS	1.2 km	MPC · JPL
668260	2011 VV_{12}	—	October 20, 2011	Mount Lemmon	Mount Lemmon Survey	·	2.2 km	MPC · JPL
668261	2011 VE_{13}	—	August 26, 2003	Cerro Tololo	Deep Ecliptic Survey	MAS	550 m	MPC · JPL
668262	2011 VB_{15}	—	October 21, 2011	Kitt Peak	Spacewatch	EUN	1.5 km	MPC · JPL
668263	2011 VM_{15}	—	December 5, 2007	Kitt Peak	Spacewatch	·	2.1 km	MPC · JPL
668264	2011 VK_{17}	—	September 18, 2006	Kitt Peak	Spacewatch	·	1.8 km	MPC · JPL
668265	2011 VZ_{17}	—	October 21, 2011	Kitt Peak	Spacewatch	URS	2.7 km	MPC · JPL
668266	2011 VV_{18}	—	November 1, 2002	Palomar	NEAT	·	2.2 km	MPC · JPL
668267	2011 VZ_{22}	—	October 20, 2011	Haleakala	Pan-STARRS 1	·	1.2 km	MPC · JPL
668268	2011 VF_{23}	—	September 24, 2011	Haleakala	Pan-STARRS 1	·	1.9 km	MPC · JPL
668269	2011 VG_{23}	—	October 21, 2011	Piszkéstető	K. Sárneczky	·	1.8 km	MPC · JPL
668270	2011 VH_{25}	—	March 13, 2013	Haleakala	Pan-STARRS 1	·	2.4 km	MPC · JPL
668271	2011 VS_{25}	—	November 3, 2011	Mount Lemmon	Mount Lemmon Survey	·	2.2 km	MPC · JPL
668272	2011 VY_{25}	—	October 8, 2016	Haleakala	Pan-STARRS 1	·	2.0 km	MPC · JPL
668273	2011 VR_{26}	—	November 3, 2011	Mount Lemmon	Mount Lemmon Survey	ARM	3.0 km	MPC · JPL
668274	2011 VL_{27}	—	November 3, 2011	Mount Lemmon	Mount Lemmon Survey	TIR	1.7 km	MPC · JPL
668275	2011 VR_{27}	—	January 4, 2016	Haleakala	Pan-STARRS 1	·	600 m	MPC · JPL
668276	2011 VZ_{27}	—	August 26, 2016	Haleakala	Pan-STARRS 1	LIX	2.5 km	MPC · JPL
668277	2011 VM_{28}	—	November 3, 2011	Mount Lemmon	Mount Lemmon Survey	(5651)	2.4 km	MPC · JPL
668278	2011 VN_{29}	—	November 3, 2011	Kitt Peak	Spacewatch	·	1.0 km	MPC · JPL
668279	2011 VR_{29}	—	August 26, 2016	Haleakala	Pan-STARRS 1	·	2.7 km	MPC · JPL
668280	2011 VQ_{30}	—	November 1, 2011	Kitt Peak	Spacewatch	EOS	1.4 km	MPC · JPL
668281	2011 VU_{30}	—	November 3, 2011	Mount Lemmon	Mount Lemmon Survey	EOS	1.5 km	MPC · JPL
668282	2011 VY_{30}	—	June 18, 2010	Mount Lemmon	Mount Lemmon Survey	EOS	1.5 km	MPC · JPL
668283	2011 VC_{32}	—	November 5, 2011	Haleakala	Pan-STARRS 1	·	2.1 km	MPC · JPL
668284	2011 VE_{34}	—	November 2, 2011	Mount Lemmon	Mount Lemmon Survey	·	2.2 km	MPC · JPL
668285	2011 VR_{34}	—	November 2, 2011	Mount Lemmon	Mount Lemmon Survey	EOS	1.7 km	MPC · JPL
668286	2011 VA_{35}	—	November 5, 2011	Haleakala	Pan-STARRS 1	·	2.4 km	MPC · JPL
668287	2011 VS_{36}	—	November 15, 2011	Kitt Peak	Spacewatch	·	2.0 km	MPC · JPL
668288	2011 WF	—	August 31, 2011	Siding Spring	SSS	·	1.1 km	MPC · JPL
668289	2011 WT_{1}	—	September 25, 2006	Catalina	CSS	GEF	1.2 km	MPC · JPL
668290	2011 WN_{9}	—	October 8, 2007	Mount Lemmon	Mount Lemmon Survey	·	950 m	MPC · JPL
668291	2011 WE_{10}	—	October 29, 2011	Kitt Peak	Spacewatch	·	2.3 km	MPC · JPL
668292	2011 WG_{10}	—	October 11, 2007	Mount Lemmon	Mount Lemmon Survey	·	860 m	MPC · JPL
668293	2011 WA_{13}	—	April 21, 2009	Mount Lemmon	Mount Lemmon Survey	PAD	1.8 km	MPC · JPL
668294	2011 WG_{16}	—	October 26, 2011	Haleakala	Pan-STARRS 1	·	990 m	MPC · JPL
668295	2011 WV_{17}	—	October 19, 2011	Mount Lemmon	Mount Lemmon Survey	·	990 m	MPC · JPL
668296	2011 WZ_{17}	—	February 26, 2009	Kitt Peak	Spacewatch	·	1.7 km	MPC · JPL
668297	2011 WQ_{23}	—	October 26, 2011	Haleakala	Pan-STARRS 1	EOS	1.4 km	MPC · JPL
668298	2011 WM_{24}	—	October 21, 2006	Palomar	NEAT	·	2.2 km	MPC · JPL
668299	2011 WA_{27}	—	October 9, 2002	Palomar	NEAT	·	1.9 km	MPC · JPL
668300	2011 WE_{28}	—	November 16, 2006	Kitt Peak	Spacewatch	·	1.6 km	MPC · JPL

== 668301–668400 ==
back to top

Designation			Discovery			Properties		Ref
Permanent	Provisional	Named after	Date	Site	Discoverer(s)	Category	Diam.	Ref
668301	2011 WW_{29}	—	May 20, 2005	Mount Lemmon	Mount Lemmon Survey	BRA	1.7 km	MPC · JPL
668302	2011 WM_{31}	—	November 22, 2011	Piszkés-tető	K. Sárneczky, A. Pál	VER	2.1 km	MPC · JPL
668303	2011 WT_{32}	—	November 15, 2011	Catalina	CSS	·	2.7 km	MPC · JPL
668304	2011 WU_{33}	—	November 16, 2001	Kitt Peak	Deep Lens Survey	·	3.1 km	MPC · JPL
668305	2011 WM_{37}	—	October 7, 2011	Charleston	R. Holmes	EOS	1.6 km	MPC · JPL
668306	2011 WY_{39}	—	November 3, 2011	Catalina	CSS	T_{j} (2.99)	2.8 km	MPC · JPL
668307	2011 WB_{40}	—	November 22, 2011	Haleakala	Pan-STARRS 1	LIX	2.9 km	MPC · JPL
668308	2011 WX_{42}	—	November 23, 2011	Mount Lemmon	Mount Lemmon Survey	·	2.5 km	MPC · JPL
668309	2011 WD_{43}	—	November 3, 2004	Palomar	NEAT	BAP	900 m	MPC · JPL
668310	2011 WP_{47}	—	October 26, 2011	Haleakala	Pan-STARRS 1	·	1.4 km	MPC · JPL
668311	2011 WW_{47}	—	October 21, 2011	Mount Lemmon	Mount Lemmon Survey	·	2.6 km	MPC · JPL
668312	2011 WD_{49}	—	August 5, 2005	Palomar	NEAT	·	2.4 km	MPC · JPL
668313	2011 WB_{50}	—	October 26, 2011	Haleakala	Pan-STARRS 1	THB	1.8 km	MPC · JPL
668314	2011 WY_{50}	—	October 25, 2011	Haleakala	Pan-STARRS 1	·	2.3 km	MPC · JPL
668315	2011 WC_{54}	—	November 19, 2006	Kitt Peak	Spacewatch	·	1.6 km	MPC · JPL
668316	2011 WE_{55}	—	December 9, 2001	Palomar	NEAT	·	820 m	MPC · JPL
668317	2011 WZ_{55}	—	October 19, 2011	Mount Lemmon	Mount Lemmon Survey	·	1.9 km	MPC · JPL
668318	2011 WA_{60}	—	November 24, 2011	Haleakala	Pan-STARRS 1	·	1.5 km	MPC · JPL
668319	2011 WH_{61}	—	October 24, 2001	Palomar	NEAT	·	2.4 km	MPC · JPL
668320	2011 WO_{61}	—	August 22, 2007	Charleston	R. Holmes	·	980 m	MPC · JPL
668321	2011 WX_{66}	—	October 26, 2011	Haleakala	Pan-STARRS 1	·	810 m	MPC · JPL
668322	2011 WK_{68}	—	April 14, 2008	Mount Lemmon	Mount Lemmon Survey	·	3.0 km	MPC · JPL
668323	2011 WW_{71}	—	November 25, 2011	Haleakala	Pan-STARRS 1	TIR	2.2 km	MPC · JPL
668324	2011 WG_{73}	—	November 16, 2011	Mount Lemmon	Mount Lemmon Survey	·	1.3 km	MPC · JPL
668325	2011 WY_{77}	—	November 23, 2011	Mount Lemmon	Mount Lemmon Survey	·	1.6 km	MPC · JPL
668326	2011 WL_{78}	—	October 18, 1995	Kitt Peak	Spacewatch	·	1.5 km	MPC · JPL
668327	2011 WX_{79}	—	October 24, 2011	Mount Lemmon	Mount Lemmon Survey	TIR	2.2 km	MPC · JPL
668328	2011 WF_{81}	—	February 27, 2009	Kitt Peak	Spacewatch	MAS	600 m	MPC · JPL
668329	2011 WW_{82}	—	November 17, 2011	Mayhill-ISON	L. Elenin	T_{j} (2.99) · EUP	3.0 km	MPC · JPL
668330	2011 WK_{84}	—	October 26, 2011	Haleakala	Pan-STARRS 1	·	2.1 km	MPC · JPL
668331	2011 WX_{84}	—	October 26, 2011	Haleakala	Pan-STARRS 1	·	820 m	MPC · JPL
668332	2011 WM_{87}	—	October 26, 2011	Haleakala	Pan-STARRS 1	·	2.4 km	MPC · JPL
668333	2011 WE_{88}	—	October 23, 2011	Haleakala	Pan-STARRS 1	·	1.9 km	MPC · JPL
668334	2011 WJ_{88}	—	November 20, 2006	Kitt Peak	Spacewatch	·	1.1 km	MPC · JPL
668335	2011 WB_{89}	—	November 16, 2011	Kitt Peak	Spacewatch	GEF	1.1 km	MPC · JPL
668336	2011 WA_{91}	—	April 18, 2009	Mount Lemmon	Mount Lemmon Survey	·	1.8 km	MPC · JPL
668337	2011 WG_{93}	—	November 1, 2011	Catalina	CSS	·	1.8 km	MPC · JPL
668338	2011 WD_{96}	—	December 5, 2008	Mount Lemmon	Mount Lemmon Survey	PHO	1.1 km	MPC · JPL
668339	2011 WB_{102}	—	August 18, 2006	Kitt Peak	Spacewatch	·	1.8 km	MPC · JPL
668340	2011 WS_{102}	—	October 4, 2011	Piszkéstető	K. Sárneczky	T_{j} (2.98) · EUP	2.7 km	MPC · JPL
668341	2011 WD_{107}	—	November 22, 2011	Zelenchukskaya Stn	T. V. Krjačko, Satovski, B.	·	1.1 km	MPC · JPL
668342	2011 WF_{109}	—	October 21, 2011	Mount Lemmon	Mount Lemmon Survey	·	1.8 km	MPC · JPL
668343	2011 WR_{109}	—	September 29, 2005	Mount Lemmon	Mount Lemmon Survey	THM	1.5 km	MPC · JPL
668344	2011 WJ_{110}	—	October 26, 2011	Haleakala	Pan-STARRS 1	·	1.7 km	MPC · JPL
668345	2011 WR_{110}	—	February 18, 2008	Mount Lemmon	Mount Lemmon Survey	·	2.1 km	MPC · JPL
668346	2011 WY_{110}	—	September 30, 2006	Mount Lemmon	Mount Lemmon Survey	·	1.8 km	MPC · JPL
668347	2011 WQ_{116}	—	September 10, 2007	Mount Lemmon	Mount Lemmon Survey	MAS	560 m	MPC · JPL
668348	2011 WJ_{117}	—	November 8, 2011	Haleakala	Pan-STARRS 1	·	1.5 km	MPC · JPL
668349	2011 WL_{118}	—	November 18, 2011	Mount Lemmon	Mount Lemmon Survey	·	2.3 km	MPC · JPL
668350	2011 WD_{119}	—	October 5, 2005	Catalina	CSS	T_{j} (2.99) · EUP	2.7 km	MPC · JPL
668351	2011 WY_{119}	—	October 26, 2011	Haleakala	Pan-STARRS 1	·	1.5 km	MPC · JPL
668352	2011 WO_{121}	—	October 24, 2011	Haleakala	Pan-STARRS 1	·	2.5 km	MPC · JPL
668353	2011 WA_{122}	—	November 17, 2011	Kitt Peak	Spacewatch	·	2.4 km	MPC · JPL
668354	2011 WM_{122}	—	August 19, 2006	Kitt Peak	Spacewatch	·	1.6 km	MPC · JPL
668355	2011 WP_{122}	—	October 24, 2011	Haleakala	Pan-STARRS 1	·	2.2 km	MPC · JPL
668356	2011 WB_{127}	—	October 21, 2011	Kitt Peak	Spacewatch	·	900 m	MPC · JPL
668357	2011 WW_{129}	—	October 23, 2011	Haleakala	Pan-STARRS 1	EOS	1.9 km	MPC · JPL
668358	2011 WZ_{129}	—	October 26, 2011	Haleakala	Pan-STARRS 1	·	2.2 km	MPC · JPL
668359	2011 WD_{130}	—	November 26, 2011	Mount Lemmon	Mount Lemmon Survey	·	2.3 km	MPC · JPL
668360	2011 WV_{132}	—	April 6, 2003	Cerro Tololo	Deep Lens Survey	·	2.8 km	MPC · JPL
668361	2011 WJ_{133}	—	November 23, 2011	Catalina	CSS	T_{j} (2.98)	2.9 km	MPC · JPL
668362	2011 WS_{135}	—	October 3, 2006	Mount Lemmon	Mount Lemmon Survey	·	2.3 km	MPC · JPL
668363	2011 WB_{136}	—	November 25, 2011	Haleakala	Pan-STARRS 1	·	2.2 km	MPC · JPL
668364	2011 WU_{137}	—	November 17, 2011	Kitt Peak	Spacewatch	·	2.6 km	MPC · JPL
668365	2011 WO_{138}	—	May 29, 2009	Mount Lemmon	Mount Lemmon Survey	EOS	1.8 km	MPC · JPL
668366	2011 WF_{139}	—	November 17, 2011	Mount Lemmon	Mount Lemmon Survey	·	2.7 km	MPC · JPL
668367	2011 WE_{142}	—	April 15, 2008	Mount Lemmon	Mount Lemmon Survey	·	2.2 km	MPC · JPL
668368	2011 WG_{143}	—	December 4, 2008	Kitt Peak	Spacewatch	·	560 m	MPC · JPL
668369	2011 WM_{143}	—	January 25, 2007	Kitt Peak	Spacewatch	·	2.1 km	MPC · JPL
668370	2011 WF_{145}	—	November 25, 2011	Haleakala	Pan-STARRS 1	·	2.4 km	MPC · JPL
668371	2011 WG_{145}	—	November 1, 2011	Mount Lemmon	Mount Lemmon Survey	·	900 m	MPC · JPL
668372	2011 WF_{147}	—	October 26, 2011	Haleakala	Pan-STARRS 1	·	1.6 km	MPC · JPL
668373	2011 WG_{148}	—	November 12, 2007	Mount Lemmon	Mount Lemmon Survey	·	1.1 km	MPC · JPL
668374	2011 WJ_{149}	—	November 30, 2011	Mount Lemmon	Mount Lemmon Survey	·	1.2 km	MPC · JPL
668375	2011 WM_{149}	—	November 30, 2011	Haleakala	Pan-STARRS 1	·	1.0 km	MPC · JPL
668376	2011 WB_{150}	—	April 21, 2007	Cerro Tololo	Deep Ecliptic Survey	·	1.3 km	MPC · JPL
668377	2011 WC_{150}	—	October 6, 2011	Piszkés-tető	K. Sárneczky, S. Kürti	EOS	1.8 km	MPC · JPL
668378	2011 WK_{151}	—	August 6, 2005	Palomar	NEAT	·	2.3 km	MPC · JPL
668379	2011 WP_{152}	—	October 23, 2011	Haleakala	Pan-STARRS 1	LIX	3.0 km	MPC · JPL
668380	2011 WY_{153}	—	February 9, 2005	Mount Lemmon	Mount Lemmon Survey	PHO	800 m	MPC · JPL
668381	2011 WJ_{157}	—	November 25, 2011	Haleakala	Pan-STARRS 1	res · 1:6	407 km	MPC · JPL
668382	2011 WD_{159}	—	October 21, 2011	Mount Lemmon	Mount Lemmon Survey	GEF	1.1 km	MPC · JPL
668383	2011 WE_{159}	—	November 18, 2011	Catalina	CSS	·	2.4 km	MPC · JPL
668384	2011 WV_{159}	—	December 25, 2005	Kitt Peak	Spacewatch	T_{j} (2.98)	2.7 km	MPC · JPL
668385	2011 WX_{159}	—	November 27, 2011	Mount Lemmon	Mount Lemmon Survey	·	3.1 km	MPC · JPL
668386	2011 WA_{160}	—	November 18, 2011	Mount Lemmon	Mount Lemmon Survey	TIR	2.5 km	MPC · JPL
668387	2011 WC_{160}	—	November 24, 2011	Haleakala	Pan-STARRS 1	·	2.9 km	MPC · JPL
668388	2011 WG_{160}	—	November 30, 2011	Kitt Peak	Spacewatch	·	1.7 km	MPC · JPL
668389	2011 WH_{160}	—	November 28, 2011	Mount Lemmon	Mount Lemmon Survey	·	2.3 km	MPC · JPL
668390	2011 WJ_{160}	—	November 25, 2011	Haleakala	Pan-STARRS 1	·	2.9 km	MPC · JPL
668391	2011 WP_{160}	—	March 8, 2013	Haleakala	Pan-STARRS 1	·	2.1 km	MPC · JPL
668392	2011 WQ_{160}	—	November 18, 2011	Mount Lemmon	Mount Lemmon Survey	·	530 m	MPC · JPL
668393	2011 WR_{161}	—	November 30, 2011	Mount Lemmon	Mount Lemmon Survey	·	2.3 km	MPC · JPL
668394	2011 WT_{161}	—	November 30, 2011	Mount Lemmon	Mount Lemmon Survey	TIR	1.9 km	MPC · JPL
668395	2011 WV_{161}	—	January 17, 2007	Kitt Peak	Spacewatch	·	2.4 km	MPC · JPL
668396	2011 WC_{162}	—	November 17, 2011	Kitt Peak	Spacewatch	·	890 m	MPC · JPL
668397	2011 WD_{162}	—	June 20, 2015	Haleakala	Pan-STARRS 1	EOS	1.6 km	MPC · JPL
668398	2011 WO_{162}	—	December 13, 2017	Mount Lemmon	Mount Lemmon Survey	·	2.0 km	MPC · JPL
668399	2011 WW_{162}	—	November 26, 2011	Kitt Peak	Spacewatch	·	2.5 km	MPC · JPL
668400	2011 WW_{163}	—	November 18, 2011	Catalina	CSS	·	1.9 km	MPC · JPL

== 668401–668500 ==
back to top

Designation			Discovery			Properties		Ref
Permanent	Provisional	Named after	Date	Site	Discoverer(s)	Category	Diam.	Ref
668401	2011 WE_{165}	—	November 26, 2011	Haleakala	Pan-STARRS 1	T_{j} (2.98)	2.6 km	MPC · JPL
668402	2011 WN_{165}	—	February 9, 2013	Haleakala	Pan-STARRS 1	·	2.1 km	MPC · JPL
668403	2011 WU_{165}	—	November 30, 2011	Kitt Peak	Spacewatch	·	840 m	MPC · JPL
668404	2011 WM_{166}	—	November 25, 2011	Haleakala	Pan-STARRS 1	·	860 m	MPC · JPL
668405	2011 WR_{166}	—	March 29, 2017	Haleakala	Pan-STARRS 1	·	1.0 km	MPC · JPL
668406	2011 WN_{168}	—	January 10, 2013	Haleakala	Pan-STARRS 1	·	2.5 km	MPC · JPL
668407	2011 WQ_{168}	—	November 18, 2011	Mount Lemmon	Mount Lemmon Survey	·	870 m	MPC · JPL
668408	2011 WA_{170}	—	November 29, 2011	Mount Lemmon	Mount Lemmon Survey	·	1.2 km	MPC · JPL
668409	2011 WN_{170}	—	November 26, 2011	Kitt Peak	Spacewatch	THB	2.2 km	MPC · JPL
668410	2011 WV_{170}	—	November 24, 2011	Haleakala	Pan-STARRS 1	·	2.0 km	MPC · JPL
668411	2011 WS_{171}	—	November 23, 2011	Kitt Peak	Spacewatch	·	2.7 km	MPC · JPL
668412	2011 WT_{174}	—	November 18, 2011	Catalina	CSS	·	2.1 km	MPC · JPL
668413	2011 WV_{175}	—	November 24, 2011	Haleakala	Pan-STARRS 1	EOS	1.4 km	MPC · JPL
668414	2011 WN_{176}	—	November 26, 2011	Mount Lemmon	Mount Lemmon Survey	·	840 m	MPC · JPL
668415	2011 WN_{179}	—	November 24, 2011	Haleakala	Pan-STARRS 1	VER	2.0 km	MPC · JPL
668416	2011 WP_{185}	—	November 24, 2011	Mount Lemmon	Mount Lemmon Survey	·	2.8 km	MPC · JPL
668417	2011 XU	—	October 20, 2011	Mount Lemmon	Mount Lemmon Survey	·	1.8 km	MPC · JPL
668418	2011 XF_{2}	—	October 3, 2005	Kitt Peak	Spacewatch	·	2.2 km	MPC · JPL
668419	2011 XY_{3}	—	August 26, 2005	Palomar	NEAT	·	1.8 km	MPC · JPL
668420	2011 XM_{4}	—	September 18, 2010	Mount Lemmon	Mount Lemmon Survey	LIX	3.4 km	MPC · JPL
668421	2011 XV_{4}	—	June 27, 2015	Haleakala	Pan-STARRS 1	EOS	1.6 km	MPC · JPL
668422	2011 XY_{4}	—	October 10, 2016	Oukaïmeden	C. Rinner	·	2.4 km	MPC · JPL
668423	2011 XT_{5}	—	November 20, 2017	Haleakala	Pan-STARRS 1	·	2.7 km	MPC · JPL
668424	2011 XO_{6}	—	December 2, 2011	ESA OGS	ESA OGS	·	920 m	MPC · JPL
668425	2011 YL_{3}	—	December 17, 2011	Ka-Dar	Gerke, V.	·	1.2 km	MPC · JPL
668426	2011 YR_{3}	—	September 14, 2006	Catalina	CSS	·	1.9 km	MPC · JPL
668427	2011 YX_{7}	—	October 17, 2010	Mount Lemmon	Mount Lemmon Survey	·	2.3 km	MPC · JPL
668428	2011 YR_{10}	—	November 30, 2011	Catalina	CSS	·	2.1 km	MPC · JPL
668429	2011 YS_{11}	—	December 18, 2011	Mayhill-ISON	L. Elenin	AEO	1.2 km	MPC · JPL
668430	2011 YK_{12}	—	December 24, 2011	Mount Lemmon	Mount Lemmon Survey	·	2.7 km	MPC · JPL
668431	2011 YT_{13}	—	January 4, 2003	Kitt Peak	Deep Lens Survey	·	2.4 km	MPC · JPL
668432	2011 YJ_{18}	—	November 3, 2007	Kitt Peak	Spacewatch	·	1.3 km	MPC · JPL
668433	2011 YE_{19}	—	December 18, 2011	ESA OGS	ESA OGS	·	2.2 km	MPC · JPL
668434	2011 YJ_{19}	—	December 27, 2011	Mount Lemmon	Mount Lemmon Survey	·	2.5 km	MPC · JPL
668435	2011 YD_{20}	—	December 27, 2011	Mount Lemmon	Mount Lemmon Survey	·	2.1 km	MPC · JPL
668436	2011 YE_{24}	—	March 8, 2008	Mount Lemmon	Mount Lemmon Survey	·	1.9 km	MPC · JPL
668437	2011 YH_{29}	—	November 23, 2011	Les Engarouines	L. Bernasconi	·	2.5 km	MPC · JPL
668438	2011 YT_{32}	—	September 28, 2003	Kitt Peak	Spacewatch	·	1.1 km	MPC · JPL
668439	2011 YD_{42}	—	December 26, 2011	Kitt Peak	Spacewatch	·	2.3 km	MPC · JPL
668440	2011 YU_{42}	—	December 27, 2011	Kitt Peak	Spacewatch	·	2.4 km	MPC · JPL
668441	2011 YH_{47}	—	December 28, 2011	Oukaïmeden	M. Ory	·	2.3 km	MPC · JPL
668442	2011 YT_{47}	—	October 25, 2011	Kitt Peak	Spacewatch	·	2.3 km	MPC · JPL
668443	2011 YT_{48}	—	November 13, 2007	Mount Lemmon	Mount Lemmon Survey	·	1.8 km	MPC · JPL
668444	2011 YJ_{50}	—	December 26, 2011	Mount Lemmon	Mount Lemmon Survey	L4	6.5 km	MPC · JPL
668445	2011 YU_{52}	—	December 27, 2011	Mount Lemmon	Mount Lemmon Survey	EOS	1.4 km	MPC · JPL
668446	2011 YB_{54}	—	December 28, 2011	Kitt Peak	Spacewatch	·	2.4 km	MPC · JPL
668447	2011 YK_{54}	—	December 29, 2011	Kitt Peak	Spacewatch	·	2.5 km	MPC · JPL
668448	2011 YL_{54}	—	February 13, 2002	Apache Point	SDSS Collaboration	·	1.9 km	MPC · JPL
668449	2011 YV_{56}	—	December 29, 2011	Kitt Peak	Spacewatch	·	2.7 km	MPC · JPL
668450	2011 YN_{57}	—	December 24, 2011	Charleston	R. Holmes	·	3.7 km	MPC · JPL
668451	2011 YX_{57}	—	December 29, 2011	Kitt Peak	Spacewatch	NYS	1.1 km	MPC · JPL
668452	2011 YB_{59}	—	December 29, 2011	Kitt Peak	Spacewatch	·	3.0 km	MPC · JPL
668453	2011 YT_{60}	—	December 29, 2011	Kitt Peak	Spacewatch	·	1.1 km	MPC · JPL
668454	2011 YT_{61}	—	December 30, 2011	Mount Lemmon	Mount Lemmon Survey	·	2.2 km	MPC · JPL
668455	2011 YJ_{62}	—	December 31, 2011	Mount Lemmon	Mount Lemmon Survey	EOS	1.2 km	MPC · JPL
668456	2011 YW_{64}	—	November 3, 2011	Ka-Dar	Gerke, V.	·	3.4 km	MPC · JPL
668457	2011 YA_{66}	—	December 31, 2011	Kitt Peak	Spacewatch	·	1.0 km	MPC · JPL
668458	2011 YY_{69}	—	January 1, 2012	Mount Lemmon	Mount Lemmon Survey	·	2.1 km	MPC · JPL
668459	2011 YW_{71}	—	December 26, 2011	Kitt Peak	Spacewatch	·	2.6 km	MPC · JPL
668460	2011 YA_{72}	—	December 26, 2006	Kitt Peak	Spacewatch	EOS	1.8 km	MPC · JPL
668461	2011 YP_{72}	—	December 29, 2011	Kitt Peak	Spacewatch	NYS	920 m	MPC · JPL
668462	2011 YE_{81}	—	December 29, 2011	Mount Lemmon	Mount Lemmon Survey	·	2.4 km	MPC · JPL
668463	2011 YF_{81}	—	April 3, 2013	Palomar	Palomar Transient Factory	LUT	3.8 km	MPC · JPL
668464	2011 YG_{81}	—	March 19, 2013	Haleakala	Pan-STARRS 1	EOS	1.6 km	MPC · JPL
668465	2011 YL_{81}	—	October 13, 2016	Haleakala	Pan-STARRS 1	·	2.5 km	MPC · JPL
668466	2011 YQ_{81}	—	July 25, 2014	Haleakala	Pan-STARRS 1	TIR	2.2 km	MPC · JPL
668467	2011 YT_{81}	—	May 28, 2014	Haleakala	Pan-STARRS 1	EOS	1.6 km	MPC · JPL
668468	2011 YX_{81}	—	July 30, 2016	Haleakala	Pan-STARRS 1	·	2.5 km	MPC · JPL
668469	2011 YY_{81}	—	July 23, 2015	Haleakala	Pan-STARRS 1	·	2.6 km	MPC · JPL
668470	2011 YT_{82}	—	May 10, 2014	Haleakala	Pan-STARRS 1	·	2.4 km	MPC · JPL
668471	2011 YV_{82}	—	December 31, 2011	Kitt Peak	Spacewatch	·	2.7 km	MPC · JPL
668472	2011 YZ_{82}	—	October 29, 2005	Kitt Peak	Spacewatch	·	3.4 km	MPC · JPL
668473	2011 YN_{83}	—	March 20, 2007	Catalina	CSS	·	2.4 km	MPC · JPL
668474	2011 YO_{83}	—	September 30, 2016	Haleakala	Pan-STARRS 1	·	2.6 km	MPC · JPL
668475	2011 YR_{83}	—	October 8, 2016	Mount Lemmon	Mount Lemmon Survey	·	2.3 km	MPC · JPL
668476	2011 YD_{84}	—	July 19, 2015	Haleakala	Pan-STARRS 1	THB	2.3 km	MPC · JPL
668477	2011 YK_{84}	—	December 27, 2011	Kitt Peak	Spacewatch	EUP	2.3 km	MPC · JPL
668478	2011 YA_{85}	—	September 10, 2016	Mount Lemmon	Mount Lemmon Survey	TIR	2.1 km	MPC · JPL
668479	2011 YV_{85}	—	December 29, 2011	Mount Lemmon	Mount Lemmon Survey	BRG	1.2 km	MPC · JPL
668480	2011 YW_{86}	—	December 28, 2011	Mount Lemmon	Mount Lemmon Survey	·	800 m	MPC · JPL
668481	2011 YA_{87}	—	December 28, 2011	Mount Lemmon	Mount Lemmon Survey	·	3.0 km	MPC · JPL
668482	2011 YX_{87}	—	July 2, 2014	Haleakala	Pan-STARRS 1	TIR	2.5 km	MPC · JPL
668483	2011 YZ_{88}	—	December 29, 2011	Kitt Peak	Spacewatch	EOS	1.7 km	MPC · JPL
668484	2011 YA_{89}	—	June 30, 2014	Haleakala	Pan-STARRS 1	PHO	800 m	MPC · JPL
668485	2011 YT_{89}	—	December 27, 2011	Mount Lemmon	Mount Lemmon Survey	·	2.0 km	MPC · JPL
668486	2011 YY_{90}	—	December 29, 2011	Mount Lemmon	Mount Lemmon Survey	L4	8.4 km	MPC · JPL
668487	2011 YB_{91}	—	December 26, 2011	Kitt Peak	Spacewatch	L4	7.3 km	MPC · JPL
668488	2011 YF_{92}	—	December 28, 2011	Kitt Peak	Spacewatch	EOS	1.7 km	MPC · JPL
668489	2011 YW_{92}	—	December 29, 2011	Mount Lemmon	Mount Lemmon Survey	·	2.3 km	MPC · JPL
668490	2011 YM_{95}	—	December 25, 2011	Mount Lemmon	Mount Lemmon Survey	·	2.8 km	MPC · JPL
668491	2011 YR_{95}	—	January 21, 2002	Kitt Peak	Spacewatch	·	1.9 km	MPC · JPL
668492	2011 YW_{95}	—	December 29, 2011	Mount Lemmon	Mount Lemmon Survey	·	2.7 km	MPC · JPL
668493	2011 YQ_{96}	—	December 29, 2011	Mount Lemmon	Mount Lemmon Survey	EOS	1.5 km	MPC · JPL
668494	2011 YG_{99}	—	December 29, 2011	Mount Lemmon	Mount Lemmon Survey	·	900 m	MPC · JPL
668495	2012 AY_{2}	—	November 21, 2003	Palomar	NEAT	·	1.6 km	MPC · JPL
668496	2012 AS_{4}	—	January 2, 2012	Kitt Peak	Spacewatch	·	1.0 km	MPC · JPL
668497	2012 AC_{6}	—	March 13, 2002	Palomar	NEAT	·	740 m	MPC · JPL
668498	2012 AQ_{7}	—	January 4, 2012	Mount Lemmon	Mount Lemmon Survey	·	1.2 km	MPC · JPL
668499	2012 AB_{11}	—	January 14, 2012	Socorro	LINEAR	AMO	120 m	MPC · JPL
668500	2012 AK_{12}	—	November 26, 2003	Kitt Peak	Spacewatch	·	1.3 km	MPC · JPL

== 668501–668600 ==
back to top

Designation			Discovery			Properties		Ref
Permanent	Provisional	Named after	Date	Site	Discoverer(s)	Category	Diam.	Ref
668501	2012 AQ_{14}	—	January 2, 2012	Mount Lemmon	Mount Lemmon Survey	TIR	2.4 km	MPC · JPL
668502	2012 AP_{16}	—	November 1, 2005	Mount Lemmon	Mount Lemmon Survey	·	2.7 km	MPC · JPL
668503	2012 AO_{19}	—	January 15, 2012	Črni Vrh	Vales, J.	·	2.6 km	MPC · JPL
668504	2012 AY_{21}	—	September 12, 2004	Kitt Peak	Spacewatch	·	2.7 km	MPC · JPL
668505	2012 AS_{25}	—	October 1, 2005	Kitt Peak	Spacewatch	·	1.5 km	MPC · JPL
668506	2012 AZ_{25}	—	January 5, 2012	Haleakala	Pan-STARRS 1	SDO	305 km	MPC · JPL
668507	2012 AD_{26}	—	May 2, 2014	Mount Lemmon	Mount Lemmon Survey	EOS	1.8 km	MPC · JPL
668508	2012 AK_{26}	—	January 3, 2012	Kitt Peak	Spacewatch	·	2.2 km	MPC · JPL
668509	2012 AZ_{26}	—	March 5, 2013	Haleakala	Pan-STARRS 1	·	3.1 km	MPC · JPL
668510	2012 AF_{27}	—	January 4, 2012	Mount Lemmon	Mount Lemmon Survey	·	1.5 km	MPC · JPL
668511	2012 AN_{27}	—	October 20, 2016	Mount Lemmon	Mount Lemmon Survey	·	2.6 km	MPC · JPL
668512	2012 AU_{27}	—	January 2, 2012	Kitt Peak	Spacewatch	·	970 m	MPC · JPL
668513	2012 AU_{28}	—	January 2, 2012	Kitt Peak	Spacewatch	·	1.1 km	MPC · JPL
668514	2012 AV_{28}	—	October 10, 2015	Haleakala	Pan-STARRS 1	·	1.1 km	MPC · JPL
668515	2012 AB_{29}	—	January 2, 2012	Kitt Peak	Spacewatch	·	2.6 km	MPC · JPL
668516	2012 AC_{29}	—	October 11, 2015	Mount Lemmon	Mount Lemmon Survey	·	990 m	MPC · JPL
668517	2012 AF_{29}	—	January 3, 2012	Mount Lemmon	Mount Lemmon Survey	EUN	1.3 km	MPC · JPL
668518	2012 AM_{30}	—	September 24, 2015	Mount Lemmon	Mount Lemmon Survey	·	1.2 km	MPC · JPL
668519	2012 AN_{30}	—	May 7, 2014	Haleakala	Pan-STARRS 1	·	2.4 km	MPC · JPL
668520	2012 AR_{30}	—	September 20, 2014	Mount Lemmon	Mount Lemmon Survey	PHO	760 m	MPC · JPL
668521	2012 AN_{31}	—	January 2, 2012	Mount Lemmon	Mount Lemmon Survey	·	1.2 km	MPC · JPL
668522	2012 AX_{31}	—	January 2, 2012	Mount Lemmon	Mount Lemmon Survey	EOS	1.9 km	MPC · JPL
668523	2012 AR_{33}	—	January 2, 2012	Mount Lemmon	Mount Lemmon Survey	L4	6.7 km	MPC · JPL
668524	2012 AJ_{35}	—	January 4, 2012	Mount Lemmon	Mount Lemmon Survey	·	2.7 km	MPC · JPL
668525	2012 AG_{36}	—	January 2, 2012	Mount Lemmon SkyCe	M. Ory	·	2.0 km	MPC · JPL
668526	2012 AS_{36}	—	January 2, 2012	Mount Lemmon	Mount Lemmon Survey	L4	6.2 km	MPC · JPL
668527 Christophgerhard	2012 BD	Christophgerhard	January 17, 2012	Maidbronn	Haeusler, B.	·	2.3 km	MPC · JPL
668528	2012 BH_{4}	—	December 24, 2011	Mount Lemmon	Mount Lemmon Survey	·	2.7 km	MPC · JPL
668529	2012 BX_{6}	—	January 18, 2012	Mount Lemmon	Mount Lemmon Survey	·	2.3 km	MPC · JPL
668530	2012 BW_{8}	—	January 2, 2012	Mayhill-ISON	L. Elenin	CLA	1.8 km	MPC · JPL
668531	2012 BM_{12}	—	January 18, 2012	Kitt Peak	Spacewatch	·	3.5 km	MPC · JPL
668532	2012 BP_{17}	—	March 20, 2002	Kitt Peak	Spacewatch	EOS	2.2 km	MPC · JPL
668533	2012 BJ_{22}	—	April 1, 2003	Apache Point	SDSS Collaboration	·	2.4 km	MPC · JPL
668534	2012 BR_{25}	—	January 18, 2012	Mount Lemmon	Mount Lemmon Survey	·	2.8 km	MPC · JPL
668535	2012 BX_{26}	—	December 25, 2011	Mount Lemmon	Mount Lemmon Survey	·	590 m	MPC · JPL
668536	2012 BC_{31}	—	April 4, 2002	Haleakala	NEAT	·	2.3 km	MPC · JPL
668537	2012 BX_{31}	—	January 10, 2007	Kitt Peak	Spacewatch	·	1.9 km	MPC · JPL
668538	2012 BB_{32}	—	September 15, 2010	Mount Lemmon	Mount Lemmon Survey	·	1.6 km	MPC · JPL
668539	2012 BX_{36}	—	January 4, 2012	Mount Lemmon	Mount Lemmon Survey	·	2.8 km	MPC · JPL
668540	2012 BT_{38}	—	December 14, 2010	Mount Lemmon	Mount Lemmon Survey	L4	6.2 km	MPC · JPL
668541	2012 BC_{40}	—	January 19, 2012	Mount Lemmon	Mount Lemmon Survey	·	2.6 km	MPC · JPL
668542	2012 BR_{43}	—	April 7, 2007	Mount Lemmon	Mount Lemmon Survey	·	2.0 km	MPC · JPL
668543	2012 BB_{50}	—	January 20, 2012	Mount Lemmon	Mount Lemmon Survey	·	1.1 km	MPC · JPL
668544	2012 BZ_{50}	—	December 27, 2011	Mount Lemmon	Mount Lemmon Survey	·	2.6 km	MPC · JPL
668545	2012 BV_{56}	—	January 23, 2012	Oukaïmeden	M. Ory	·	2.4 km	MPC · JPL
668546	2012 BK_{58}	—	March 11, 2005	Mount Lemmon	Mount Lemmon Survey	·	1.0 km	MPC · JPL
668547	2012 BE_{59}	—	July 24, 2003	Palomar	NEAT	·	4.2 km	MPC · JPL
668548	2012 BN_{67}	—	January 20, 2012	Mount Lemmon	Mount Lemmon Survey	·	3.0 km	MPC · JPL
668549	2012 BN_{75}	—	April 1, 2003	Apache Point	SDSS Collaboration	·	2.3 km	MPC · JPL
668550	2012 BR_{76}	—	September 23, 2008	Mount Lemmon	Mount Lemmon Survey	L4	6.7 km	MPC · JPL
668551	2012 BS_{76}	—	January 26, 2012	Haleakala	Pan-STARRS 1	L4	6.2 km	MPC · JPL
668552	2012 BN_{79}	—	September 15, 2010	Charleston	R. Holmes	·	2.1 km	MPC · JPL
668553	2012 BO_{80}	—	November 1, 2010	Mount Lemmon	Mount Lemmon Survey	·	2.4 km	MPC · JPL
668554	2012 BR_{82}	—	January 27, 2012	Mount Lemmon	Mount Lemmon Survey	·	2.7 km	MPC · JPL
668555	2012 BB_{83}	—	January 27, 2012	Mount Lemmon	Mount Lemmon Survey	·	1.1 km	MPC · JPL
668556	2012 BN_{83}	—	January 18, 2012	Kitt Peak	Spacewatch	·	2.4 km	MPC · JPL
668557	2012 BT_{86}	—	November 27, 2011	Catalina	CSS	·	1.2 km	MPC · JPL
668558	2012 BE_{92}	—	January 26, 2012	Mount Lemmon	Mount Lemmon Survey	·	2.4 km	MPC · JPL
668559	2012 BM_{92}	—	January 26, 2012	Haleakala	Pan-STARRS 1	·	900 m	MPC · JPL
668560	2012 BQ_{92}	—	January 26, 2012	Haleakala	Pan-STARRS 1	L4	7.6 km	MPC · JPL
668561	2012 BP_{96}	—	December 29, 2011	Mount Lemmon	Mount Lemmon Survey	L4	6.0 km	MPC · JPL
668562	2012 BV_{98}	—	January 26, 2012	Haleakala	Pan-STARRS 1	V	690 m	MPC · JPL
668563	2012 BZ_{98}	—	January 21, 2012	Kitt Peak	Spacewatch	·	2.3 km	MPC · JPL
668564	2012 BY_{110}	—	January 27, 2012	Kitt Peak	Spacewatch	·	1.9 km	MPC · JPL
668565	2012 BU_{117}	—	December 30, 2011	Kitt Peak	Spacewatch	VER	2.2 km	MPC · JPL
668566	2012 BL_{118}	—	November 13, 2007	Mount Lemmon	Mount Lemmon Survey	·	850 m	MPC · JPL
668567	2012 BH_{121}	—	January 29, 2012	Mayhill-ISON	L. Elenin	·	3.1 km	MPC · JPL
668568	2012 BQ_{124}	—	January 18, 2012	Les Engarouines	L. Bernasconi	·	3.1 km	MPC · JPL
668569	2012 BO_{133}	—	December 8, 1999	Kitt Peak	Spacewatch	EUP	4.4 km	MPC · JPL
668570	2012 BQ_{135}	—	December 28, 2011	Mount Lemmon	Mount Lemmon Survey	·	2.7 km	MPC · JPL
668571	2012 BJ_{137}	—	January 14, 2012	Kitt Peak	Spacewatch	NYS	940 m	MPC · JPL
668572	2012 BA_{139}	—	January 29, 2012	Mount Lemmon	Mount Lemmon Survey	VER	2.5 km	MPC · JPL
668573	2012 BW_{139}	—	January 30, 2012	Kitt Peak	Spacewatch	·	800 m	MPC · JPL
668574	2012 BD_{141}	—	November 16, 2009	Mount Lemmon	Mount Lemmon Survey	L4	6.2 km	MPC · JPL
668575	2012 BQ_{141}	—	January 26, 2012	Sandlot	G. Hug	·	1.8 km	MPC · JPL
668576	2012 BR_{145}	—	January 27, 2012	Mount Lemmon	Mount Lemmon Survey	·	2.8 km	MPC · JPL
668577	2012 BF_{151}	—	January 26, 2012	Haleakala	Pan-STARRS 1	L4	6.5 km	MPC · JPL
668578	2012 BU_{153}	—	January 26, 2012	Haleakala	Pan-STARRS 1	·	860 m	MPC · JPL
668579	2012 BH_{157}	—	March 20, 2007	Lulin	LUSS	·	3.0 km	MPC · JPL
668580	2012 BU_{159}	—	January 31, 2012	Haleakala	Pan-STARRS 1	·	2.1 km	MPC · JPL
668581	2012 BR_{160}	—	January 27, 2012	Mount Lemmon	Mount Lemmon Survey	·	2.5 km	MPC · JPL
668582	2012 BT_{160}	—	January 26, 2012	Haleakala	Pan-STARRS 1	·	900 m	MPC · JPL
668583	2012 BU_{160}	—	January 21, 2012	Kitt Peak	Spacewatch	·	2.6 km	MPC · JPL
668584	2012 BJ_{162}	—	January 3, 2017	Haleakala	Pan-STARRS 1	·	2.9 km	MPC · JPL
668585	2012 BK_{162}	—	January 19, 2012	Mount Lemmon	Mount Lemmon Survey	·	1.2 km	MPC · JPL
668586	2012 BY_{162}	—	January 21, 2012	Haleakala	Pan-STARRS 1	·	1.3 km	MPC · JPL
668587	2012 BB_{163}	—	July 25, 2015	Haleakala	Pan-STARRS 1	·	2.7 km	MPC · JPL
668588	2012 BL_{167}	—	January 27, 2012	Mount Lemmon	Mount Lemmon Survey	URS	2.9 km	MPC · JPL
668589	2012 BV_{168}	—	June 24, 2014	Haleakala	Pan-STARRS 1	·	1.3 km	MPC · JPL
668590	2012 BC_{170}	—	March 21, 2017	Haleakala	Pan-STARRS 1	·	1.6 km	MPC · JPL
668591	2012 BK_{171}	—	January 15, 2016	Haleakala	Pan-STARRS 1	·	1.1 km	MPC · JPL
668592	2012 BQ_{171}	—	June 2, 2014	Haleakala	Pan-STARRS 1	·	2.4 km	MPC · JPL
668593	2012 BU_{171}	—	March 19, 2013	Haleakala	Pan-STARRS 1	·	2.7 km	MPC · JPL
668594	2012 BU_{172}	—	January 26, 2012	Mount Lemmon	Mount Lemmon Survey	L4	6.4 km	MPC · JPL
668595	2012 BZ_{172}	—	January 19, 2012	Kitt Peak	Spacewatch	L4	7.2 km	MPC · JPL
668596	2012 BF_{173}	—	February 5, 2016	Haleakala	Pan-STARRS 1	NYS	960 m	MPC · JPL
668597	2012 BJ_{175}	—	January 27, 2012	Mount Lemmon	Mount Lemmon Survey	·	1.1 km	MPC · JPL
668598	2012 BB_{176}	—	January 27, 2012	Mount Lemmon	Mount Lemmon Survey	·	2.3 km	MPC · JPL
668599	2012 BG_{178}	—	January 26, 2012	Haleakala	Pan-STARRS 1	·	2.8 km	MPC · JPL
668600	2012 BM_{178}	—	January 26, 2012	Haleakala	Pan-STARRS 1	L4	6.5 km	MPC · JPL

== 668601–668700 ==
back to top

Designation			Discovery			Properties		Ref
Permanent	Provisional	Named after	Date	Site	Discoverer(s)	Category	Diam.	Ref
668601	2012 BJ_{179}	—	January 20, 2012	Mount Lemmon	Mount Lemmon Survey	L4	6.8 km	MPC · JPL
668602	2012 BA_{184}	—	January 26, 2012	Mount Lemmon	Mount Lemmon Survey	L4	5.4 km	MPC · JPL
668603	2012 BX_{184}	—	January 29, 2012	Kitt Peak	Spacewatch	·	3.1 km	MPC · JPL
668604	2012 BJ_{192}	—	January 18, 2012	Mount Lemmon	Mount Lemmon Survey	THM	1.8 km	MPC · JPL
668605	2012 CJ_{1}	—	January 11, 2008	Kitt Peak	Spacewatch	·	1.0 km	MPC · JPL
668606	2012 CL_{1}	—	October 2, 2010	Nogales	M. Schwartz, P. R. Holvorcem	V	750 m	MPC · JPL
668607	2012 CH_{9}	—	September 28, 2003	Sierra Nevada	Sota, A.	MAS	650 m	MPC · JPL
668608	2012 CK_{9}	—	February 10, 2008	Kitt Peak	Spacewatch	·	610 m	MPC · JPL
668609	2012 CN_{10}	—	February 23, 2003	Kitt Peak	Spacewatch	·	1.9 km	MPC · JPL
668610	2012 CM_{18}	—	January 27, 2012	Kitt Peak	Spacewatch	·	1.0 km	MPC · JPL
668611	2012 CT_{20}	—	November 1, 2010	Mount Lemmon	Mount Lemmon Survey	·	2.6 km	MPC · JPL
668612	2012 CM_{22}	—	February 13, 2012	Haleakala	Pan-STARRS 1	·	1.3 km	MPC · JPL
668613	2012 CU_{23}	—	January 1, 2012	Mount Lemmon	Mount Lemmon Survey	·	2.0 km	MPC · JPL
668614	2012 CU_{27}	—	February 12, 2012	Mount Lemmon	Mount Lemmon Survey	·	1.1 km	MPC · JPL
668615	2012 CJ_{31}	—	January 18, 2012	Bergisch Gladbach	W. Bickel	·	2.7 km	MPC · JPL
668616	2012 CA_{32}	—	December 27, 2011	Mount Lemmon	Mount Lemmon Survey	EUN	1.1 km	MPC · JPL
668617	2012 CH_{39}	—	December 30, 2005	Kitt Peak	Spacewatch	·	2.7 km	MPC · JPL
668618	2012 CC_{40}	—	April 4, 2008	Kitt Peak	Spacewatch	·	1.8 km	MPC · JPL
668619	2012 CP_{43}	—	August 7, 2004	Palomar	NEAT	·	2.1 km	MPC · JPL
668620	2012 CV_{43}	—	December 27, 2005	Kitt Peak	Spacewatch	·	2.4 km	MPC · JPL
668621	2012 CN_{44}	—	February 27, 2001	Kitt Peak	Spacewatch	·	2.8 km	MPC · JPL
668622	2012 CC_{49}	—	April 15, 2008	Mount Lemmon	Mount Lemmon Survey	·	3.0 km	MPC · JPL
668623	2012 CJ_{50}	—	February 13, 2012	Haleakala	Pan-STARRS 1	URS	2.9 km	MPC · JPL
668624	2012 CS_{59}	—	February 11, 2012	Mount Lemmon	Mount Lemmon Survey	NYS	1.1 km	MPC · JPL
668625	2012 CD_{60}	—	February 2, 2012	Mount Lemmon	Mount Lemmon Survey	T_{j} (2.98)	2.4 km	MPC · JPL
668626	2012 CG_{60}	—	November 25, 2005	Catalina	CSS	·	2.8 km	MPC · JPL
668627	2012 CJ_{60}	—	February 12, 2012	Haleakala	Pan-STARRS 1	T_{j} (2.99)	2.6 km	MPC · JPL
668628	2012 CM_{61}	—	July 6, 2014	Haleakala	Pan-STARRS 1	·	2.6 km	MPC · JPL
668629	2012 CW_{62}	—	September 16, 2014	Haleakala	Pan-STARRS 1	TIR	2.5 km	MPC · JPL
668630	2012 CR_{63}	—	October 28, 2010	Mount Lemmon	Mount Lemmon Survey	·	2.9 km	MPC · JPL
668631	2012 CF_{64}	—	December 6, 2015	Haleakala	Pan-STARRS 1	·	950 m	MPC · JPL
668632	2012 CQ_{64}	—	February 1, 2012	Kitt Peak	Spacewatch	·	2.9 km	MPC · JPL
668633	2012 CR_{65}	—	January 30, 2016	Mount Lemmon	Mount Lemmon Survey	·	1.2 km	MPC · JPL
668634	2012 DE	—	February 16, 2001	Nogales	Tenagra II	·	3.2 km	MPC · JPL
668635	2012 DR_{5}	—	January 21, 2012	Haleakala	Pan-STARRS 1	JUN	820 m	MPC · JPL
668636	2012 DE_{11}	—	December 30, 2011	Kitt Peak	Spacewatch	·	3.1 km	MPC · JPL
668637	2012 DQ_{14}	—	December 27, 2011	Mount Lemmon	Mount Lemmon Survey	·	1.4 km	MPC · JPL
668638	2012 DB_{24}	—	February 21, 2012	Kitt Peak	Spacewatch	·	1.8 km	MPC · JPL
668639	2012 DH_{25}	—	October 10, 2004	Kitt Peak	Deep Ecliptic Survey	·	2.9 km	MPC · JPL
668640	2012 DZ_{27}	—	January 19, 2012	Haleakala	Pan-STARRS 1	·	2.4 km	MPC · JPL
668641	2012 DQ_{28}	—	February 2, 2006	Mauna Kea	P. A. Wiegert	·	1.8 km	MPC · JPL
668642	2012 DT_{28}	—	September 26, 2003	Apache Point	SDSS Collaboration	·	3.3 km	MPC · JPL
668643	2012 DR_{30}	—	February 6, 2008	XuYi	PMO NEO Survey Program	T_{j} (0.98) · centaur	188 km	MPC · JPL
668644	2012 DQ_{37}	—	April 17, 2001	Anderson Mesa	LONEOS	·	1.5 km	MPC · JPL
668645	2012 DY_{37}	—	February 25, 2012	Catalina	CSS	·	800 m	MPC · JPL
668646	2012 DC_{38}	—	February 26, 2012	Oukaïmeden	C. Rinner	·	3.3 km	MPC · JPL
668647	2012 DY_{41}	—	February 8, 2008	Kitt Peak	Spacewatch	·	550 m	MPC · JPL
668648	2012 DH_{43}	—	January 25, 2006	Kitt Peak	Spacewatch	·	3.5 km	MPC · JPL
668649	2012 DP_{47}	—	February 28, 2008	Mount Lemmon	Mount Lemmon Survey	·	1.4 km	MPC · JPL
668650	2012 DN_{49}	—	February 21, 2012	Kitt Peak	Spacewatch	PHO	870 m	MPC · JPL
668651	2012 DN_{55}	—	February 24, 2012	Mount Lemmon	Mount Lemmon Survey	HNS	840 m	MPC · JPL
668652	2012 DO_{67}	—	December 5, 2011	Haleakala	Pan-STARRS 1	·	3.7 km	MPC · JPL
668653	2012 DK_{70}	—	June 3, 2008	Mount Lemmon	Mount Lemmon Survey	·	2.3 km	MPC · JPL
668654	2012 DL_{70}	—	April 5, 2008	Kitt Peak	Spacewatch	·	2.9 km	MPC · JPL
668655	2012 DL_{74}	—	February 27, 2012	Haleakala	Pan-STARRS 1	·	910 m	MPC · JPL
668656	2012 DD_{76}	—	December 4, 2005	Kitt Peak	Spacewatch	·	3.3 km	MPC · JPL
668657	2012 DR_{76}	—	April 5, 2005	Palomar	NEAT	·	1.2 km	MPC · JPL
668658	2012 DF_{77}	—	February 28, 2012	Haleakala	Pan-STARRS 1	·	1.8 km	MPC · JPL
668659	2012 DR_{77}	—	February 18, 2001	Haleakala	NEAT	·	3.3 km	MPC · JPL
668660	2012 DU_{77}	—	October 7, 2009	La Silla	A. Galád	·	3.5 km	MPC · JPL
668661	2012 DH_{84}	—	March 15, 2007	Kitt Peak	Spacewatch	·	2.0 km	MPC · JPL
668662	2012 DZ_{84}	—	February 22, 2012	Kitt Peak	Spacewatch	·	520 m	MPC · JPL
668663	2012 DW_{87}	—	February 24, 2012	Haleakala	Pan-STARRS 1	T_{j} (2.91)	3.2 km	MPC · JPL
668664	2012 DW_{89}	—	November 22, 2011	Mount Lemmon	Mount Lemmon Survey	·	1.7 km	MPC · JPL
668665	2012 DU_{92}	—	March 21, 2001	Kitt Peak	SKADS	·	2.2 km	MPC · JPL
668666	2012 DR_{95}	—	August 28, 2009	Kitt Peak	Spacewatch	·	2.5 km	MPC · JPL
668667	2012 DJ_{97}	—	November 15, 2010	Kitt Peak	Spacewatch	·	2.8 km	MPC · JPL
668668	2012 DL_{98}	—	February 27, 2012	Haleakala	Pan-STARRS 1	·	2.6 km	MPC · JPL
668669	2012 DQ_{98}	—	February 4, 2012	Haleakala	Pan-STARRS 1	·	1.0 km	MPC · JPL
668670	2012 DJ_{100}	—	September 26, 2003	Apache Point	SDSS Collaboration	VER	2.4 km	MPC · JPL
668671	2012 DL_{101}	—	September 27, 2009	Mount Lemmon	Mount Lemmon Survey	·	3.0 km	MPC · JPL
668672	2012 DH_{102}	—	February 21, 2012	Kitt Peak	Spacewatch	·	2.3 km	MPC · JPL
668673	2012 DG_{106}	—	April 14, 2007	Mount Lemmon	Mount Lemmon Survey	·	3.4 km	MPC · JPL
668674	2012 DW_{106}	—	June 4, 2013	Mount Lemmon	Mount Lemmon Survey	·	1.0 km	MPC · JPL
668675	2012 DX_{106}	—	April 30, 2014	Haleakala	Pan-STARRS 1	·	3.1 km	MPC · JPL
668676	2012 DE_{107}	—	February 20, 2012	Haleakala	Pan-STARRS 1	·	2.9 km	MPC · JPL
668677	2012 DR_{107}	—	February 16, 2012	Haleakala	Pan-STARRS 1	·	840 m	MPC · JPL
668678	2012 DF_{108}	—	February 19, 2012	Kitt Peak	Spacewatch	·	2.7 km	MPC · JPL
668679	2012 DH_{108}	—	February 20, 2012	Haleakala	Pan-STARRS 1	(69559)	2.9 km	MPC · JPL
668680	2012 DE_{114}	—	February 27, 2012	Haleakala	Pan-STARRS 1	·	3.6 km	MPC · JPL
668681	2012 DL_{117}	—	February 26, 2012	Mount Lemmon	Mount Lemmon Survey	H	500 m	MPC · JPL
668682	2012 DQ_{119}	—	February 27, 2012	Haleakala	Pan-STARRS 1	·	980 m	MPC · JPL
668683	2012 DF_{126}	—	February 27, 2012	Haleakala	Pan-STARRS 1	·	1.5 km	MPC · JPL
668684	2012 EG	—	January 19, 2012	Haleakala	Pan-STARRS 1	·	690 m	MPC · JPL
668685	2012 ET_{2}	—	January 3, 2012	Charleston	R. Holmes	·	2.2 km	MPC · JPL
668686	2012 EC_{3}	—	February 25, 2012	Pinto Valley	Paquette, A., Rowe, D.	·	1.2 km	MPC · JPL
668687	2012 EG_{3}	—	March 1, 2012	Kitt Peak	Spacewatch	·	420 m	MPC · JPL
668688	2012 EY_{12}	—	April 5, 2008	Mount Lemmon	Mount Lemmon Survey	BRG	930 m	MPC · JPL
668689	2012 EM_{13}	—	March 15, 2012	Mount Lemmon	Mount Lemmon Survey	·	770 m	MPC · JPL
668690	2012 EX_{18}	—	March 13, 2012	Mount Lemmon	Mount Lemmon Survey	RAF	680 m	MPC · JPL
668691	2012 EG_{22}	—	February 25, 2012	Catalina	CSS	·	870 m	MPC · JPL
668692	2012 EV_{29}	—	March 13, 2012	Mount Lemmon	Mount Lemmon Survey	MAR	770 m	MPC · JPL
668693	2012 FG_{6}	—	September 11, 2004	Kitt Peak	Spacewatch	EOS	1.7 km	MPC · JPL
668694	2012 FK_{6}	—	February 8, 2008	Kitt Peak	Spacewatch	·	1.4 km	MPC · JPL
668695	2012 FK_{8}	—	February 21, 2012	Kitt Peak	Spacewatch	·	3.0 km	MPC · JPL
668696	2012 FP_{12}	—	September 26, 2003	Apache Point	SDSS Collaboration	VER	3.4 km	MPC · JPL
668697	2012 FT_{13}	—	February 27, 2012	Haleakala	Pan-STARRS 1	H	390 m	MPC · JPL
668698	2012 FF_{14}	—	March 20, 2001	Anderson Mesa	LONEOS	·	3.3 km	MPC · JPL
668699	2012 FG_{15}	—	October 19, 2003	Apache Point	SDSS Collaboration	·	880 m	MPC · JPL
668700	2012 FF_{17}	—	February 28, 2008	Mount Lemmon	Mount Lemmon Survey	·	670 m	MPC · JPL

== 668701–668800 ==
back to top

Designation			Discovery			Properties		Ref
Permanent	Provisional	Named after	Date	Site	Discoverer(s)	Category	Diam.	Ref
668701	2012 FR_{19}	—	September 16, 2009	Kitt Peak	Spacewatch	(260)	2.8 km	MPC · JPL
668702	2012 FJ_{21}	—	February 25, 2012	Kitt Peak	Spacewatch	EUP	2.3 km	MPC · JPL
668703	2012 FA_{25}	—	March 17, 2012	Mount Lemmon	Mount Lemmon Survey	·	920 m	MPC · JPL
668704	2012 FA_{30}	—	September 28, 2003	Apache Point	SDSS Collaboration	HYG	2.8 km	MPC · JPL
668705	2012 FL_{30}	—	December 8, 2010	Mayhill-ISON	L. Elenin	EMA	3.3 km	MPC · JPL
668706	2012 FR_{30}	—	August 23, 2006	Palomar	NEAT	V	720 m	MPC · JPL
668707	2012 FA_{31}	—	February 23, 2012	Mount Lemmon	Mount Lemmon Survey	·	580 m	MPC · JPL
668708	2012 FW_{32}	—	October 7, 2005	Mauna Kea	A. Boattini	VER	2.6 km	MPC · JPL
668709	2012 FO_{33}	—	March 24, 2012	Mount Lemmon	Mount Lemmon Survey	·	830 m	MPC · JPL
668710	2012 FJ_{34}	—	August 18, 2009	Kitt Peak	Spacewatch	EOS	1.9 km	MPC · JPL
668711	2012 FN_{34}	—	November 2, 2010	Kitt Peak	Spacewatch	V	710 m	MPC · JPL
668712	2012 FN_{36}	—	October 23, 2003	Apache Point	SDSS Collaboration	·	3.0 km	MPC · JPL
668713	2012 FH_{37}	—	March 25, 2012	Mount Lemmon	Mount Lemmon Survey	·	2.0 km	MPC · JPL
668714	2012 FY_{41}	—	March 21, 2012	Haleakala	Pan-STARRS 1	·	1.3 km	MPC · JPL
668715	2012 FP_{42}	—	March 23, 2012	Mayhill-ISON	L. Elenin	·	2.8 km	MPC · JPL
668716	2012 FF_{43}	—	April 6, 2008	Mount Lemmon	Mount Lemmon Survey	(5)	720 m	MPC · JPL
668717	2012 FA_{45}	—	May 8, 1999	Catalina	CSS	H	640 m	MPC · JPL
668718	2012 FH_{47}	—	October 2, 2006	Mount Lemmon	Mount Lemmon Survey	·	910 m	MPC · JPL
668719	2012 FM_{54}	—	March 23, 2012	Mount Lemmon	Mount Lemmon Survey	·	870 m	MPC · JPL
668720	2012 FY_{54}	—	March 16, 2012	Kitt Peak	Spacewatch	·	970 m	MPC · JPL
668721	2012 FA_{55}	—	September 28, 2003	Kitt Peak	Spacewatch	·	3.0 km	MPC · JPL
668722	2012 FR_{55}	—	March 25, 2012	Mount Lemmon	Mount Lemmon Survey	·	720 m	MPC · JPL
668723	2012 FT_{55}	—	September 16, 2003	Palomar	NEAT	·	3.3 km	MPC · JPL
668724	2012 FZ_{55}	—	February 10, 2008	Kitt Peak	Spacewatch	·	1.3 km	MPC · JPL
668725	2012 FL_{56}	—	November 14, 2010	Mount Lemmon	Mount Lemmon Survey	·	800 m	MPC · JPL
668726	2012 FG_{60}	—	March 27, 2012	Mount Lemmon	Mount Lemmon Survey	·	2.4 km	MPC · JPL
668727	2012 FS_{62}	—	March 29, 2012	Haleakala	Pan-STARRS 1	APO	330 m	MPC · JPL
668728	2012 FW_{63}	—	October 16, 2009	Mount Lemmon	Mount Lemmon Survey	·	2.4 km	MPC · JPL
668729	2012 FH_{65}	—	September 21, 2009	Mount Lemmon	Mount Lemmon Survey	KOR	1.3 km	MPC · JPL
668730	2012 FM_{69}	—	April 22, 2004	Kitt Peak	Spacewatch	·	920 m	MPC · JPL
668731	2012 FX_{69}	—	January 29, 2011	Mount Lemmon	Mount Lemmon Survey	·	2.5 km	MPC · JPL
668732	2012 FC_{70}	—	July 21, 2006	Mount Lemmon	Mount Lemmon Survey	·	710 m	MPC · JPL
668733	2012 FS_{71}	—	March 28, 2012	Haleakala	Pan-STARRS 1	·	1.1 km	MPC · JPL
668734	2012 FP_{76}	—	December 6, 2011	Haleakala	Pan-STARRS 1	THB	2.9 km	MPC · JPL
668735	2012 FD_{79}	—	September 25, 2003	Palomar	NEAT	·	1.4 km	MPC · JPL
668736	2012 FW_{79}	—	September 6, 1999	Piszkéstető	Kelemen, J.	KOR	1.6 km	MPC · JPL
668737	2012 FZ_{79}	—	February 13, 2002	Apache Point	SDSS	·	2.0 km	MPC · JPL
668738	2012 FX_{80}	—	May 20, 2001	Haleakala	NEAT	T_{j} (2.98) · EUP	4.4 km	MPC · JPL
668739	2012 FT_{81}	—	November 8, 2010	Kitt Peak	Spacewatch	EOS	1.9 km	MPC · JPL
668740	2012 FG_{82}	—	March 26, 2012	Mount Lemmon	Mount Lemmon Survey	·	2.9 km	MPC · JPL
668741	2012 FG_{87}	—	March 31, 2012	Kitt Peak	Spacewatch	·	1.5 km	MPC · JPL
668742	2012 FP_{87}	—	March 17, 2012	Mount Lemmon	Mount Lemmon Survey	·	1.1 km	MPC · JPL
668743	2012 FC_{89}	—	March 27, 2012	Mayhill-ISON	L. Elenin	·	1.1 km	MPC · JPL
668744	2012 FJ_{90}	—	March 23, 2012	Mount Lemmon	Mount Lemmon Survey	·	760 m	MPC · JPL
668745	2012 FT_{90}	—	April 12, 2004	Kitt Peak	Spacewatch	·	650 m	MPC · JPL
668746	2012 FY_{90}	—	August 27, 2013	Haleakala	Pan-STARRS 1	H	420 m	MPC · JPL
668747	2012 FB_{91}	—	January 8, 2016	Haleakala	Pan-STARRS 1	·	970 m	MPC · JPL
668748	2012 FK_{94}	—	January 3, 2017	Haleakala	Pan-STARRS 1	·	2.3 km	MPC · JPL
668749	2012 FF_{96}	—	March 16, 2012	Mount Lemmon	Mount Lemmon Survey	·	1.8 km	MPC · JPL
668750	2012 FR_{97}	—	March 16, 2012	Mount Lemmon	Mount Lemmon Survey	·	880 m	MPC · JPL
668751	2012 FE_{98}	—	January 17, 2016	Haleakala	Pan-STARRS 1	·	860 m	MPC · JPL
668752	2012 FO_{100}	—	March 25, 2012	Mount Lemmon	Mount Lemmon Survey	·	2.5 km	MPC · JPL
668753	2012 FB_{107}	—	March 27, 2012	Haleakala	Pan-STARRS 1	·	1.7 km	MPC · JPL
668754	2012 FY_{108}	—	March 17, 2012	Mount Lemmon	Mount Lemmon Survey	·	2.8 km	MPC · JPL
668755	2012 GH_{1}	—	March 14, 2012	Haleakala	Pan-STARRS 1	H	550 m	MPC · JPL
668756	2012 GD_{11}	—	March 16, 2012	Haleakala	Pan-STARRS 1	·	1.9 km	MPC · JPL
668757	2012 GU_{13}	—	April 13, 2012	Kitt Peak	Spacewatch	·	1.2 km	MPC · JPL
668758	2012 GT_{14}	—	March 27, 2008	Kitt Peak	Spacewatch	·	1.1 km	MPC · JPL
668759	2012 GY_{14}	—	September 18, 1998	Kitt Peak	Spacewatch	·	1.8 km	MPC · JPL
668760	2012 GU_{16}	—	March 30, 2012	Kitt Peak	Spacewatch	·	2.5 km	MPC · JPL
668761	2012 GE_{22}	—	April 15, 2012	Haleakala	Pan-STARRS 1	·	950 m	MPC · JPL
668762	2012 GN_{23}	—	March 28, 2008	Kitt Peak	Spacewatch	·	780 m	MPC · JPL
668763	2012 GY_{25}	—	October 21, 2009	Zelenchukskaya Stn	T. V. Krjačko, Satovski, B.	·	3.2 km	MPC · JPL
668764	2012 GY_{26}	—	April 15, 2012	Haleakala	Pan-STARRS 1	·	930 m	MPC · JPL
668765	2012 GC_{28}	—	October 23, 2003	Apache Point	SDSS Collaboration	·	3.0 km	MPC · JPL
668766	2012 GD_{31}	—	October 19, 2003	Apache Point	SDSS Collaboration	·	2.5 km	MPC · JPL
668767	2012 GG_{33}	—	March 16, 2012	Kitt Peak	Spacewatch	·	1.3 km	MPC · JPL
668768	2012 GE_{35}	—	September 23, 2009	Mount Lemmon	Mount Lemmon Survey	·	2.9 km	MPC · JPL
668769	2012 GF_{36}	—	February 28, 2006	Mount Lemmon	Mount Lemmon Survey	·	3.0 km	MPC · JPL
668770	2012 GY_{36}	—	April 24, 2001	Kitt Peak	Spacewatch	·	3.1 km	MPC · JPL
668771	2012 GW_{37}	—	August 13, 2002	Palomar	NEAT	·	3.2 km	MPC · JPL
668772	2012 GZ_{41}	—	April 15, 2012	Haleakala	Pan-STARRS 1	·	1.1 km	MPC · JPL
668773	2012 GA_{42}	—	October 25, 2014	Haleakala	Pan-STARRS 1	(5)	1.1 km	MPC · JPL
668774	2012 GV_{47}	—	July 4, 2013	Haleakala	Pan-STARRS 1	·	1.3 km	MPC · JPL
668775	2012 GA_{49}	—	April 13, 2012	Haleakala	Pan-STARRS 1	MAR	770 m	MPC · JPL
668776	2012 GX_{50}	—	April 1, 2012	Haleakala	Pan-STARRS 1	·	1.5 km	MPC · JPL
668777	2012 HC	—	October 5, 2002	Palomar	NEAT	H	540 m	MPC · JPL
668778	2012 HT	—	April 16, 2012	Haleakala	Pan-STARRS 1	H	430 m	MPC · JPL
668779	2012 HO_{1}	—	April 18, 2012	Mount Lemmon	Mount Lemmon Survey	AMO	60 m	MPC · JPL
668780	2012 HW_{3}	—	April 16, 2012	Kitt Peak	Spacewatch	·	1.2 km	MPC · JPL
668781	2012 HX_{4}	—	April 17, 2012	Kitt Peak	Spacewatch	·	1.6 km	MPC · JPL
668782	2012 HO_{10}	—	April 20, 2012	Mount Lemmon	Mount Lemmon Survey	·	1.9 km	MPC · JPL
668783	2012 HC_{11}	—	September 22, 2009	Mount Lemmon	Mount Lemmon Survey	·	3.8 km	MPC · JPL
668784	2012 HT_{14}	—	May 16, 2002	Haleakala	NEAT	·	2.1 km	MPC · JPL
668785	2012 HF_{15}	—	March 28, 2012	Kitt Peak	Spacewatch	·	1.0 km	MPC · JPL
668786	2012 HG_{15}	—	April 18, 2012	Mount Lemmon	Mount Lemmon Survey	·	1.1 km	MPC · JPL
668787	2012 HF_{17}	—	October 16, 2003	Palomar	NEAT	·	3.6 km	MPC · JPL
668788	2012 HK_{18}	—	January 23, 2006	Kitt Peak	Spacewatch	·	2.2 km	MPC · JPL
668789	2012 HV_{21}	—	April 20, 2012	Catalina	CSS	EUN	1.4 km	MPC · JPL
668790	2012 HW_{23}	—	April 24, 2012	Haleakala	Pan-STARRS 1	BRG	1.3 km	MPC · JPL
668791	2012 HZ_{23}	—	April 25, 2012	Mount Lemmon	Mount Lemmon Survey	·	910 m	MPC · JPL
668792	2012 HR_{24}	—	February 14, 2005	Catalina	CSS	·	810 m	MPC · JPL
668793	2012 HL_{28}	—	October 21, 2008	Mount Lemmon	Mount Lemmon Survey	·	2.5 km	MPC · JPL
668794	2012 HB_{31}	—	April 27, 2012	Haleakala	Pan-STARRS 1	H	420 m	MPC · JPL
668795	2012 HF_{32}	—	May 28, 2008	Mount Lemmon	Mount Lemmon Survey	(5)	820 m	MPC · JPL
668796	2012 HO_{37}	—	August 7, 2004	Palomar	NEAT	·	1.1 km	MPC · JPL
668797	2012 HB_{41}	—	June 9, 2004	Siding Spring	SSS	·	1.3 km	MPC · JPL
668798	2012 HF_{41}	—	February 13, 2008	Kitt Peak	Spacewatch	MAS	750 m	MPC · JPL
668799	2012 HQ_{42}	—	October 26, 2009	Mount Lemmon	Mount Lemmon Survey	VER	3.0 km	MPC · JPL
668800	2012 HZ_{44}	—	April 20, 2012	Mount Lemmon	Mount Lemmon Survey	·	2.1 km	MPC · JPL

== 668801–668900 ==
back to top

Designation			Discovery			Properties		Ref
Permanent	Provisional	Named after	Date	Site	Discoverer(s)	Category	Diam.	Ref
668801	2012 HQ_{46}	—	March 24, 2012	Kitt Peak	Spacewatch	THB	2.6 km	MPC · JPL
668802	2012 HR_{48}	—	April 21, 2012	Haleakala	Pan-STARRS 1	·	610 m	MPC · JPL
668803	2012 HX_{48}	—	April 21, 2012	Haleakala	Pan-STARRS 1	·	830 m	MPC · JPL
668804	2012 HN_{52}	—	September 12, 2005	Kitt Peak	Spacewatch	·	1.1 km	MPC · JPL
668805	2012 HC_{54}	—	January 30, 2011	Mayhill-ISON	L. Elenin	EOS	2.3 km	MPC · JPL
668806	2012 HZ_{61}	—	September 30, 2003	Kitt Peak	Spacewatch	·	2.4 km	MPC · JPL
668807	2012 HA_{62}	—	April 20, 2012	Kitt Peak	Spacewatch	·	1.7 km	MPC · JPL
668808	2012 HK_{62}	—	March 25, 2003	Palomar	NEAT	·	1.3 km	MPC · JPL
668809	2012 HR_{62}	—	October 18, 2004	Kitt Peak	Deep Ecliptic Survey	·	2.4 km	MPC · JPL
668810	2012 HH_{65}	—	September 29, 2005	Kitt Peak	Spacewatch	·	1.2 km	MPC · JPL
668811	2012 HS_{66}	—	January 11, 2008	Catalina	CSS	·	1.0 km	MPC · JPL
668812	2012 HM_{72}	—	May 4, 2008	Kitt Peak	Spacewatch	·	1.2 km	MPC · JPL
668813	2012 HD_{74}	—	April 15, 2012	Haleakala	Pan-STARRS 1	·	750 m	MPC · JPL
668814	2012 HW_{78}	—	April 30, 2012	Mount Lemmon	Mount Lemmon Survey	·	1.3 km	MPC · JPL
668815	2012 HX_{80}	—	April 18, 2012	Kitt Peak	Spacewatch	·	820 m	MPC · JPL
668816	2012 HY_{81}	—	April 21, 2012	Mount Graham	K. Černis, R. P. Boyle	·	1.6 km	MPC · JPL
668817	2012 HD_{85}	—	March 25, 2012	Mount Lemmon	Mount Lemmon Survey	·	3.0 km	MPC · JPL
668818	2012 HZ_{85}	—	April 27, 2012	Haleakala	Pan-STARRS 1	·	1.3 km	MPC · JPL
668819	2012 HF_{87}	—	April 30, 2012	Kitt Peak	Spacewatch	·	650 m	MPC · JPL
668820	2012 HA_{88}	—	April 20, 2012	Mount Lemmon	Mount Lemmon Survey	·	1.2 km	MPC · JPL
668821	2012 HG_{88}	—	April 28, 2012	Mount Lemmon	Mount Lemmon Survey	·	860 m	MPC · JPL
668822	2012 HH_{88}	—	April 16, 2012	Kitt Peak	Spacewatch	·	1.6 km	MPC · JPL
668823	2012 HV_{94}	—	March 4, 2016	Haleakala	Pan-STARRS 1	·	1.2 km	MPC · JPL
668824	2012 HY_{99}	—	April 30, 2012	Mount Lemmon	Mount Lemmon Survey	KON	1.7 km	MPC · JPL
668825	2012 HA_{100}	—	April 25, 2012	Haleakala	Pan-STARRS 1	H	430 m	MPC · JPL
668826	2012 HA_{101}	—	April 28, 2012	Mount Lemmon	Mount Lemmon Survey	·	1.2 km	MPC · JPL
668827	2012 HK_{101}	—	April 27, 2012	Haleakala	Pan-STARRS 1	·	780 m	MPC · JPL
668828	2012 HO_{101}	—	April 19, 2012	Mount Lemmon	Mount Lemmon Survey	·	1.2 km	MPC · JPL
668829	2012 HE_{109}	—	April 30, 2012	Mount Lemmon	Mount Lemmon Survey	·	690 m	MPC · JPL
668830	2012 HQ_{111}	—	April 16, 2012	Haleakala	Pan-STARRS 1	VER	2.1 km	MPC · JPL
668831	2012 JN_{6}	—	April 30, 2012	Mount Lemmon	Mount Lemmon Survey	·	1.0 km	MPC · JPL
668832	2012 JY_{8}	—	December 4, 2010	Mount Lemmon	Mount Lemmon Survey	·	2.9 km	MPC · JPL
668833	2012 JM_{10}	—	September 26, 2006	Catalina	CSS	·	570 m	MPC · JPL
668834	2012 JA_{13}	—	February 24, 2006	Palomar	NEAT	·	3.0 km	MPC · JPL
668835	2012 JA_{17}	—	March 30, 2012	Mount Lemmon	Mount Lemmon Survey	EUN	710 m	MPC · JPL
668836	2012 JB_{18}	—	May 13, 2012	Kitt Peak	Spacewatch	·	1.3 km	MPC · JPL
668837	2012 JL_{20}	—	March 28, 2012	Mount Lemmon	Mount Lemmon Survey	TIN	850 m	MPC · JPL
668838	2012 JA_{26}	—	April 27, 2012	Haleakala	Pan-STARRS 1	·	1.7 km	MPC · JPL
668839	2012 JB_{26}	—	November 18, 2009	Kitt Peak	Spacewatch	·	1.2 km	MPC · JPL
668840	2012 JJ_{28}	—	May 14, 2012	Mount Lemmon	Mount Lemmon Survey	·	830 m	MPC · JPL
668841	2012 JL_{30}	—	February 9, 2008	Mount Lemmon	Mount Lemmon Survey	·	760 m	MPC · JPL
668842	2012 JF_{31}	—	May 15, 2012	Haleakala	Pan-STARRS 1	HNS	1.1 km	MPC · JPL
668843	2012 JN_{32}	—	May 12, 2012	Mount Lemmon	Mount Lemmon Survey	THB	2.5 km	MPC · JPL
668844	2012 JG_{37}	—	August 4, 2005	Palomar	NEAT	NYS	1.1 km	MPC · JPL
668845	2012 JY_{37}	—	March 11, 2005	Mount Lemmon	Mount Lemmon Survey	·	710 m	MPC · JPL
668846	2012 JE_{39}	—	May 19, 2002	Palomar	NEAT	·	960 m	MPC · JPL
668847	2012 JJ_{40}	—	May 12, 2012	Mount Lemmon	Mount Lemmon Survey	·	1.1 km	MPC · JPL
668848	2012 JK_{42}	—	January 31, 2011	Piszkés-tető	K. Sárneczky, Z. Kuli	·	2.5 km	MPC · JPL
668849	2012 JK_{45}	—	April 17, 2012	Kitt Peak	Spacewatch	·	3.0 km	MPC · JPL
668850	2012 JC_{47}	—	May 13, 2012	Kitt Peak	Spacewatch	HNS	990 m	MPC · JPL
668851	2012 JE_{47}	—	May 14, 2012	Haleakala	Pan-STARRS 1	T_{j} (2.97) · EUP	4.1 km	MPC · JPL
668852	2012 JC_{49}	—	May 12, 2012	Mount Lemmon	Mount Lemmon Survey	EUN	1.1 km	MPC · JPL
668853	2012 JX_{49}	—	May 12, 2012	Mount Lemmon	Mount Lemmon Survey	·	870 m	MPC · JPL
668854	2012 JK_{56}	—	May 12, 2012	Mount Lemmon	Mount Lemmon Survey	·	2.2 km	MPC · JPL
668855	2012 JJ_{59}	—	October 15, 1998	Kitt Peak	Spacewatch	EOS	1.9 km	MPC · JPL
668856	2012 JP_{60}	—	November 24, 2009	Kitt Peak	Spacewatch	·	3.4 km	MPC · JPL
668857	2012 JZ_{67}	—	April 19, 2012	Kitt Peak	Spacewatch	·	3.0 km	MPC · JPL
668858	2012 JR_{68}	—	April 11, 2016	Haleakala	Pan-STARRS 1	(116763)	1.5 km	MPC · JPL
668859	2012 JS_{68}	—	May 12, 2012	Mount Lemmon	Mount Lemmon Survey	·	760 m	MPC · JPL
668860	2012 JU_{71}	—	May 12, 2012	Mount Lemmon	Mount Lemmon Survey	·	1.8 km	MPC · JPL
668861	2012 KA_{3}	—	December 10, 2009	Mount Lemmon	Mount Lemmon Survey	·	3.7 km	MPC · JPL
668862	2012 KU_{6}	—	May 19, 2012	Haleakala	Pan-STARRS 1	H	450 m	MPC · JPL
668863	2012 KF_{8}	—	May 19, 2012	Haleakala	Pan-STARRS 1	·	1.5 km	MPC · JPL
668864	2012 KS_{8}	—	March 24, 2012	Kitt Peak	Spacewatch	·	1.5 km	MPC · JPL
668865	2012 KV_{9}	—	February 3, 2011	Piszkés-tető	K. Sárneczky, Z. Kuli	EOS	1.8 km	MPC · JPL
668866	2012 KS_{11}	—	May 19, 2012	Mayhill-ISON	L. Elenin	·	1.3 km	MPC · JPL
668867	2012 KY_{14}	—	April 28, 2012	Mount Lemmon	Mount Lemmon Survey	·	2.6 km	MPC · JPL
668868	2012 KH_{16}	—	May 20, 2012	Mount Lemmon	Mount Lemmon Survey	(5)	980 m	MPC · JPL
668869	2012 KU_{16}	—	September 27, 2003	Apache Point	SDSS Collaboration	EOS	2.0 km	MPC · JPL
668870	2012 KS_{18}	—	April 19, 2012	Kitt Peak	Spacewatch	·	1.1 km	MPC · JPL
668871	2012 KN_{24}	—	March 27, 2012	Mount Lemmon	Mount Lemmon Survey	(1547)	1.5 km	MPC · JPL
668872	2012 KJ_{25}	—	February 24, 2006	Junk Bond	D. Healy	H	510 m	MPC · JPL
668873	2012 KN_{25}	—	November 16, 2006	Kitt Peak	Spacewatch	(5)	970 m	MPC · JPL
668874	2012 KX_{25}	—	November 11, 2004	Piszkéstető	K. Sárneczky	·	2.8 km	MPC · JPL
668875	2012 KB_{26}	—	October 3, 2006	Mount Lemmon	Mount Lemmon Survey	V	510 m	MPC · JPL
668876	2012 KQ_{27}	—	April 27, 2012	Mount Lemmon	Mount Lemmon Survey	·	1.3 km	MPC · JPL
668877	2012 KO_{28}	—	October 22, 2003	Apache Point	SDSS	·	3.1 km	MPC · JPL
668878	2012 KC_{34}	—	May 16, 2012	Mount Lemmon	Mount Lemmon Survey	·	3.2 km	MPC · JPL
668879	2012 KS_{36}	—	May 17, 2012	Mount Lemmon	Mount Lemmon Survey	·	1.3 km	MPC · JPL
668880	2012 KY_{37}	—	May 17, 2012	Haleakala	Pan-STARRS 1	·	2.7 km	MPC · JPL
668881	2012 KE_{39}	—	September 26, 2003	Apache Point	SDSS	·	3.1 km	MPC · JPL
668882	2012 KM_{44}	—	October 27, 2009	Kitt Peak	Spacewatch	·	1.6 km	MPC · JPL
668883	2012 KR_{44}	—	March 30, 2008	Kitt Peak	Spacewatch	·	1.1 km	MPC · JPL
668884	2012 KO_{45}	—	March 27, 2012	Mount Lemmon	Mount Lemmon Survey	·	1.1 km	MPC · JPL
668885	2012 KY_{50}	—	May 31, 2012	Mount Lemmon	Mount Lemmon Survey	·	1.1 km	MPC · JPL
668886	2012 KK_{52}	—	October 26, 2005	Kitt Peak	Spacewatch	·	950 m	MPC · JPL
668887	2012 KW_{52}	—	May 21, 2012	Mount Lemmon	Mount Lemmon Survey	·	1.6 km	MPC · JPL
668888	2012 KF_{54}	—	December 11, 2014	Haleakala	Pan-STARRS 1	HNS	830 m	MPC · JPL
668889	2012 KA_{55}	—	May 27, 2012	Mount Lemmon	Mount Lemmon Survey	·	820 m	MPC · JPL
668890	2012 KL_{57}	—	May 20, 2012	Mount Lemmon	Mount Lemmon Survey	·	1.1 km	MPC · JPL
668891	2012 KR_{57}	—	March 13, 2016	Haleakala	Pan-STARRS 1	·	930 m	MPC · JPL
668892	2012 KU_{58}	—	August 31, 2014	Mount Lemmon	Mount Lemmon Survey	·	1.5 km	MPC · JPL
668893	2012 KT_{59}	—	April 11, 2015	Mount Lemmon	Mount Lemmon Survey	·	510 m	MPC · JPL
668894	2012 KA_{60}	—	September 2, 2002	Kitt Peak	Spacewatch	·	2.0 km	MPC · JPL
668895	2012 KD_{60}	—	May 16, 2012	Haleakala	Pan-STARRS 1	·	960 m	MPC · JPL
668896	2012 LJ_{4}	—	May 16, 2012	Haleakala	Pan-STARRS 1	·	740 m	MPC · JPL
668897	2012 LM_{5}	—	December 21, 2008	Kitt Peak	Spacewatch	H	410 m	MPC · JPL
668898	2012 LS_{9}	—	May 13, 2012	Mount Lemmon	Mount Lemmon Survey	·	880 m	MPC · JPL
668899	2012 LE_{10}	—	October 22, 2009	Mount Lemmon	Mount Lemmon Survey	·	2.0 km	MPC · JPL
668900	2012 LN_{11}	—	September 13, 2002	Palomar	NEAT	VER	2.7 km	MPC · JPL

== 668901–669000 ==
back to top

Designation			Discovery			Properties		Ref
Permanent	Provisional	Named after	Date	Site	Discoverer(s)	Category	Diam.	Ref
668901	2012 LM_{12}	—	May 25, 2012	ESA OGS	ESA OGS	·	3.6 km	MPC · JPL
668902	2012 LH_{13}	—	March 25, 2006	Palomar	NEAT	TIR	2.8 km	MPC · JPL
668903	2012 LB_{15}	—	April 28, 2012	Mount Lemmon	Mount Lemmon Survey	·	1.3 km	MPC · JPL
668904	2012 LD_{15}	—	June 10, 2012	Kitt Peak	Spacewatch	EUN	770 m	MPC · JPL
668905	2012 LJ_{16}	—	June 9, 2012	Mount Lemmon	Mount Lemmon Survey	·	2.6 km	MPC · JPL
668906	2012 LA_{17}	—	May 23, 2012	Mount Lemmon	Mount Lemmon Survey	·	890 m	MPC · JPL
668907	2012 LF_{17}	—	June 12, 2012	Haleakala	Pan-STARRS 1	·	1.1 km	MPC · JPL
668908	2012 LS_{20}	—	June 10, 2012	Mount Lemmon	Mount Lemmon Survey	·	1.8 km	MPC · JPL
668909	2012 LL_{22}	—	June 12, 2012	Mount Lemmon	Mount Lemmon Survey	·	980 m	MPC · JPL
668910	2012 LF_{24}	—	June 14, 2012	Mount Lemmon	Mount Lemmon Survey	·	1.6 km	MPC · JPL
668911	2012 LJ_{24}	—	September 17, 2004	Anderson Mesa	LONEOS	·	1.3 km	MPC · JPL
668912	2012 LY_{24}	—	June 15, 2012	Haleakala	Pan-STARRS 1	·	1.3 km	MPC · JPL
668913	2012 LN_{25}	—	June 12, 2012	Kitt Peak	Spacewatch	·	1.5 km	MPC · JPL
668914	2012 LD_{27}	—	November 10, 2013	Mount Lemmon	Mount Lemmon Survey	·	1.3 km	MPC · JPL
668915	2012 LE_{27}	—	July 14, 2013	Haleakala	Pan-STARRS 1	(194)	1.5 km	MPC · JPL
668916	2012 LP_{27}	—	June 10, 2012	Nogales	M. Schwartz, P. R. Holvorcem	·	1.1 km	MPC · JPL
668917	2012 LW_{27}	—	January 20, 2015	Haleakala	Pan-STARRS 1	·	1.5 km	MPC · JPL
668918	2012 LK_{28}	—	December 29, 2014	Mount Lemmon	Mount Lemmon Survey	·	1.3 km	MPC · JPL
668919	2012 LS_{29}	—	March 29, 2017	Haleakala	Pan-STARRS 1	·	2.1 km	MPC · JPL
668920	2012 LU_{29}	—	October 13, 2017	Mount Lemmon	Mount Lemmon Survey	·	1.3 km	MPC · JPL
668921	2012 LR_{31}	—	June 9, 2012	Mount Lemmon	Mount Lemmon Survey	·	3.0 km	MPC · JPL
668922	2012 MB	—	June 11, 2012	Haleakala	Pan-STARRS 1	·	1.2 km	MPC · JPL
668923	2012 MZ	—	June 9, 2012	Kitt Peak	Spacewatch	·	3.3 km	MPC · JPL
668924	2012 MA_{6}	—	June 22, 2012	SM Montmagastrell	SM Montmagastrell	·	1.2 km	MPC · JPL
668925	2012 MD_{8}	—	June 16, 2012	Haleakala	Pan-STARRS 1	·	1.2 km	MPC · JPL
668926	2012 MZ_{11}	—	June 16, 2012	Haleakala	Pan-STARRS 1	H	410 m	MPC · JPL
668927	2012 MB_{16}	—	June 8, 2012	Haleakala	Pan-STARRS 1	·	2.3 km	MPC · JPL
668928	2012 MZ_{16}	—	April 16, 2016	Haleakala	Pan-STARRS 1	·	2.0 km	MPC · JPL
668929	2012 MH_{17}	—	January 26, 2015	Haleakala	Pan-STARRS 1	·	1.8 km	MPC · JPL
668930	2012 MO_{18}	—	June 16, 2012	Haleakala	Pan-STARRS 1	·	1.7 km	MPC · JPL
668931	2012 MZ_{18}	—	August 9, 2004	Anderson Mesa	LONEOS	·	1.3 km	MPC · JPL
668932	2012 MA_{19}	—	June 16, 2012	Haleakala	Pan-STARRS 1	·	1.5 km	MPC · JPL
668933	2012 NO_{1}	—	July 15, 2012	Siding Spring	SSS	EUN	1.0 km	MPC · JPL
668934	2012 NS_{1}	—	July 15, 2012	Siding Spring	SSS	·	1.5 km	MPC · JPL
668935	2012 OC_{1}	—	July 18, 2012	Siding Spring	SSS	AMO +1km	1.1 km	MPC · JPL
668936	2012 OZ_{5}	—	October 24, 2008	Catalina	CSS	·	1.8 km	MPC · JPL
668937	2012 OP_{6}	—	July 18, 2012	Siding Spring	SSS	JUN	1.1 km	MPC · JPL
668938	2012 PX_{2}	—	May 23, 2006	Kitt Peak	Spacewatch	·	1.7 km	MPC · JPL
668939	2012 PR_{5}	—	September 29, 2008	Catalina	CSS	·	1.5 km	MPC · JPL
668940	2012 PC_{6}	—	October 10, 2002	Socorro	LINEAR	H	560 m	MPC · JPL
668941	2012 PN_{10}	—	August 9, 2012	Haleakala	Pan-STARRS 1	·	1.4 km	MPC · JPL
668942	2012 PF_{17}	—	February 28, 2008	Kitt Peak	Spacewatch	·	570 m	MPC · JPL
668943	2012 PN_{20}	—	September 22, 2008	Kitt Peak	Spacewatch	JUN	800 m	MPC · JPL
668944	2012 PX_{20}	—	November 10, 2004	Kitt Peak	Spacewatch	·	1.5 km	MPC · JPL
668945	2012 PB_{21}	—	October 1, 2008	Kitt Peak	Spacewatch	·	1.3 km	MPC · JPL
668946	2012 PE_{22}	—	August 10, 2012	Kitt Peak	Spacewatch	EUN	750 m	MPC · JPL
668947	2012 PL_{23}	—	September 23, 2008	Mount Lemmon	Mount Lemmon Survey	·	1.4 km	MPC · JPL
668948	2012 PC_{28}	—	July 10, 2005	Reedy Creek	J. Broughton	·	760 m	MPC · JPL
668949	2012 PP_{28}	—	August 14, 2012	La Sagra	OAM	APO · PHA	500 m	MPC · JPL
668950	2012 PY_{28}	—	October 19, 2008	Kitt Peak	Spacewatch	·	1.3 km	MPC · JPL
668951	2012 PT_{30}	—	October 8, 2008	Mount Lemmon	Mount Lemmon Survey	·	1.5 km	MPC · JPL
668952	2012 PZ_{30}	—	August 11, 2012	Mayhill-ISON	L. Elenin	·	630 m	MPC · JPL
668953	2012 PP_{31}	—	August 24, 2003	Socorro	LINEAR	·	1.7 km	MPC · JPL
668954	2012 PS_{34}	—	August 11, 2012	Mayhill-ISON	L. Elenin	·	2.1 km	MPC · JPL
668955	2012 PK_{35}	—	August 11, 2012	Tivoli	G. Lehmann, ~Knöfel, A.	·	620 m	MPC · JPL
668956	2012 PM_{35}	—	January 2, 2011	Mount Lemmon	Mount Lemmon Survey	V	850 m	MPC · JPL
668957	2012 PS_{35}	—	August 13, 2012	Haleakala	Pan-STARRS 1	MAR	1.1 km	MPC · JPL
668958	2012 PE_{36}	—	January 25, 2007	Kitt Peak	Spacewatch	·	1.3 km	MPC · JPL
668959	2012 PL_{36}	—	August 28, 2003	Palomar	NEAT	·	1.7 km	MPC · JPL
668960	2012 PH_{40}	—	August 8, 2012	Haleakala	Pan-STARRS 1	·	1.1 km	MPC · JPL
668961	2012 PQ_{40}	—	August 13, 2012	Haleakala	Pan-STARRS 1	·	1.1 km	MPC · JPL
668962	2012 PA_{42}	—	September 16, 2003	Kitt Peak	Spacewatch	AEO	930 m	MPC · JPL
668963	2012 PB_{42}	—	September 19, 2003	Kitt Peak	Spacewatch	·	1.8 km	MPC · JPL
668964	2012 PB_{44}	—	August 14, 2012	Haleakala	Pan-STARRS 1	NYS	1.1 km	MPC · JPL
668965	2012 PC_{44}	—	January 15, 2010	Kitt Peak	Spacewatch	·	2.3 km	MPC · JPL
668966	2012 PP_{44}	—	April 25, 2007	Mount Lemmon	Mount Lemmon Survey	·	1.5 km	MPC · JPL
668967	2012 PA_{46}	—	March 18, 2015	Haleakala	Pan-STARRS 1	·	2.2 km	MPC · JPL
668968	2012 PO_{46}	—	August 6, 2012	Haleakala	Pan-STARRS 1	·	1.3 km	MPC · JPL
668969	2012 PS_{46}	—	August 11, 2012	Siding Spring	SSS	·	1.7 km	MPC · JPL
668970	2012 PY_{47}	—	August 10, 2012	Kitt Peak	Spacewatch	·	1.7 km	MPC · JPL
668971	2012 PR_{49}	—	August 10, 2012	Kitt Peak	Spacewatch	·	580 m	MPC · JPL
668972	2012 PV_{49}	—	August 14, 2012	Haleakala	Pan-STARRS 1	·	580 m	MPC · JPL
668973	2012 PW_{53}	—	August 10, 2012	Kitt Peak	Spacewatch	L5	8.2 km	MPC · JPL
668974	2012 PB_{54}	—	August 8, 2012	Haleakala	Pan-STARRS 1	·	1.4 km	MPC · JPL
668975	2012 PY_{61}	—	August 14, 2012	Haleakala	Pan-STARRS 1	·	550 m	MPC · JPL
668976	2012 QT	—	October 20, 2008	Kitt Peak	Spacewatch	AGN	910 m	MPC · JPL
668977	2012 QY_{1}	—	August 16, 2012	ESA OGS	ESA OGS	·	1.6 km	MPC · JPL
668978	2012 QQ_{2}	—	August 17, 2012	Haleakala	Pan-STARRS 1	H	440 m	MPC · JPL
668979	2012 QX_{9}	—	August 17, 2012	Sandlot	G. Hug	·	1.2 km	MPC · JPL
668980	2012 QH_{13}	—	August 17, 2012	Haleakala	Pan-STARRS 1	JUN	770 m	MPC · JPL
668981	2012 QV_{15}	—	August 21, 2012	Haleakala	Pan-STARRS 1	·	1.5 km	MPC · JPL
668982 Grechuta	2012 QX_{18}	Grechuta	August 20, 2012	Tincana	M. Kusiak, M. Żołnowski	·	1.3 km	MPC · JPL
668983	2012 QZ_{20}	—	February 16, 2010	Mount Lemmon	Mount Lemmon Survey	·	1.7 km	MPC · JPL
668984	2012 QX_{21}	—	August 14, 2012	Kitt Peak	Spacewatch	·	500 m	MPC · JPL
668985	2012 QA_{24}	—	August 24, 2012	Kitt Peak	Spacewatch	·	1.6 km	MPC · JPL
668986	2012 QF_{26}	—	September 18, 2003	Palomar	NEAT	·	1.6 km	MPC · JPL
668987	2012 QF_{29}	—	October 22, 2003	Kitt Peak	Spacewatch	·	1.2 km	MPC · JPL
668988	2012 QA_{37}	—	September 16, 2004	Kitt Peak	Spacewatch	·	630 m	MPC · JPL
668989	2012 QV_{37}	—	August 25, 2012	Haleakala	Pan-STARRS 1	BRA	1.3 km	MPC · JPL
668990	2012 QO_{39}	—	November 22, 2005	Kitt Peak	Spacewatch	·	1.6 km	MPC · JPL
668991	2012 QP_{42}	—	August 16, 2012	ESA OGS	ESA OGS	·	1.8 km	MPC · JPL
668992	2012 QD_{45}	—	August 25, 2012	Haleakala	Pan-STARRS 1	·	1.5 km	MPC · JPL
668993	2012 QM_{45}	—	August 16, 2012	ESA OGS	ESA OGS	·	1.9 km	MPC · JPL
668994	2012 QD_{47}	—	October 7, 2005	Mauna Kea	A. Boattini	(7744)	1.6 km	MPC · JPL
668995	2012 QJ_{49}	—	October 21, 2003	Kitt Peak	Spacewatch	DOR	1.8 km	MPC · JPL
668996	2012 QE_{53}	—	September 18, 2003	Kitt Peak	Spacewatch	·	1.4 km	MPC · JPL
668997	2012 QP_{54}	—	January 23, 2015	Haleakala	Pan-STARRS 1	·	1.9 km	MPC · JPL
668998	2012 QU_{54}	—	August 8, 2017	Haleakala	Pan-STARRS 1	TIN	970 m	MPC · JPL
668999	2012 QG_{55}	—	August 24, 2012	Kitt Peak	Spacewatch	·	2.0 km	MPC · JPL
669000	2012 QJ_{55}	—	August 17, 2012	Haleakala	Pan-STARRS 1	·	1.6 km	MPC · JPL

back to top

== Meaning of names ==
As minor planet discoveries are confirmed, they are given a permanent number by the IAU's Minor Planet Center (MPC), and the discoverers can then submit names for them, following the IAU's naming conventions. The list below concerns those minor planets in the specified number-range that have received names, and explains the meanings of those names.

Official naming citations of newly named small Solar System bodies are approved and published in a bulletin by IAU's Working Group for Small Bodies Nomenclature (WGSBN). Before May 2021, citations were published in MPC's Minor Planet Circulars for many decades. Recent citations can also be found on the JPL Small-Body Database (SBDB). Until his death in 2016, German astronomer Lutz D. Schmadel compiled these citations into the Dictionary of Minor Planet Names (DMP) and regularly updated the collection.

Based on Paul Herget's The Names of the Minor Planets, Schmadel also researched the unclear origin of numerous asteroids, most of which had been named prior to World War II. This article incorporates text from this source, which is in the public domain: SBDB New namings may only be added to this list below after official publication as the preannouncement of names is condemned. The WGSBN publishes a comprehensive guideline for the naming rules of non-cometary small Solar System bodies.

Named minor planet	Provisional	This minor planet was named for...	Ref · Catalog
668527 Christophgerhard	2012 BD	Christoph Gerhard (b. 1964), a German electrical engineer, theologian, publisher and author.	IAU · 668527
668982 Grechuta	2012 QX_{18}	Marek Michał Grechuta (1945–2006), Polish singer, poet, composer and painter.	IAU · 668982
