= List of minor planets: 676001–677000 =

The following is a partial list of minor planets, running from minor-planet number 676001 through 677000, inclusive. The primary data for this and other partial lists is based on JPL's "Small-Body Orbital Elements" and data available from the Minor Planet Center. Critical list information is also provided by the MPC, unless otherwise specified from Lowell Observatory. A detailed description of the table's columns and additional sources are given on the main page including a complete list of every page in this series, and a statistical break-up on the dynamical classification of minor planets.

Also see the summary list of all named bodies in numerical and alphabetical order, and the corresponding naming citations for the number range of this particular list. New namings may only be added to this list after official publication, as the preannouncement of names is condemned by the Working Group for Small Bodies Nomenclature of the International Astronomical Union.

Near-Earth obj.	MBA (inner)	MBA (outer)	Centaur
Mars-crosser	MBA (middle)	Jupiter trojan	Trans-Neptunian obj.
Unclassified

== 676001–676100 ==
Designation			Discovery			Properties		Ref
Permanent	Provisional	Named after	Date	Site	Discoverer(s)	Category	Diam.	Ref
676001	2016 CQ_{93}	—	April 21, 2013	Haleakala	Pan-STARRS 1	·	1.3 km	MPC · JPL
676002	2016 CO_{97}	—	February 5, 2016	Haleakala	Pan-STARRS 1	·	2.2 km	MPC · JPL
676003	2016 CM_{104}	—	June 29, 2014	Mount Lemmon	Mount Lemmon Survey	·	770 m	MPC · JPL
676004	2016 CJ_{106}	—	January 15, 2016	Haleakala	Pan-STARRS 1	·	1.1 km	MPC · JPL
676005	2016 CT_{106}	—	February 8, 2008	Kitt Peak	Spacewatch	EUN	780 m	MPC · JPL
676006	2016 CO_{109}	—	August 30, 2014	Mayhill-ISON	L. Elenin	·	880 m	MPC · JPL
676007	2016 CD_{115}	—	September 19, 2014	Haleakala	Pan-STARRS 1	·	1.1 km	MPC · JPL
676008	2016 CX_{115}	—	October 3, 1999	Kitt Peak	Spacewatch	V	470 m	MPC · JPL
676009	2016 CW_{116}	—	February 5, 2016	Haleakala	Pan-STARRS 1	·	1.1 km	MPC · JPL
676010	2016 CR_{118}	—	December 9, 2015	Haleakala	Pan-STARRS 1	·	1.0 km	MPC · JPL
676011	2016 CB_{130}	—	March 19, 2013	Haleakala	Pan-STARRS 1	·	610 m	MPC · JPL
676012	2016 CV_{136}	—	February 11, 2011	Mount Lemmon	Mount Lemmon Survey	H	430 m	MPC · JPL
676013	2016 CX_{136}	—	February 3, 2016	Haleakala	Pan-STARRS 1	·	1.7 km	MPC · JPL
676014	2016 CE_{143}	—	February 27, 2012	Haleakala	Pan-STARRS 1	·	910 m	MPC · JPL
676015	2016 CY_{144}	—	February 4, 2006	Kitt Peak	Spacewatch	·	2.1 km	MPC · JPL
676016	2016 CW_{148}	—	February 23, 2012	Mount Lemmon	Mount Lemmon Survey	·	840 m	MPC · JPL
676017	2016 CX_{150}	—	August 9, 2013	Catalina	CSS	·	3.8 km	MPC · JPL
676018	2016 CB_{152}	—	January 16, 2011	Mount Lemmon	Mount Lemmon Survey	EOS	1.6 km	MPC · JPL
676019	2016 CR_{152}	—	January 10, 2008	Kitt Peak	Spacewatch	·	840 m	MPC · JPL
676020	2016 CB_{153}	—	January 13, 2005	Catalina	CSS	·	1.2 km	MPC · JPL
676021	2016 CC_{153}	—	March 20, 2001	Kitt Peak	Spacewatch	MAS	530 m	MPC · JPL
676022	2016 CF_{153}	—	March 23, 2006	Kitt Peak	Spacewatch	·	940 m	MPC · JPL
676023	2016 CO_{157}	—	February 7, 2008	Kitt Peak	Spacewatch	EUN	740 m	MPC · JPL
676024	2016 CB_{159}	—	January 18, 2008	Mount Lemmon	Mount Lemmon Survey	H	360 m	MPC · JPL
676025	2016 CD_{159}	—	April 11, 2013	Mount Lemmon	Mount Lemmon Survey	·	1.1 km	MPC · JPL
676026	2016 CJ_{159}	—	March 2, 1998	Kitt Peak	Spacewatch	H	500 m	MPC · JPL
676027	2016 CU_{161}	—	July 25, 2014	Haleakala	Pan-STARRS 1	·	690 m	MPC · JPL
676028	2016 CA_{166}	—	September 30, 2008	Catalina	CSS	·	3.5 km	MPC · JPL
676029	2016 CL_{166}	—	February 29, 2008	Kitt Peak	Spacewatch	·	1.1 km	MPC · JPL
676030	2016 CS_{166}	—	January 16, 2005	Kitt Peak	Spacewatch	·	3.2 km	MPC · JPL
676031	2016 CB_{170}	—	October 31, 2011	Mount Lemmon	Mount Lemmon Survey	·	700 m	MPC · JPL
676032	2016 CW_{171}	—	June 7, 2013	Mount Lemmon	Mount Lemmon Survey	PHO	730 m	MPC · JPL
676033	2016 CD_{173}	—	October 5, 2007	Kitt Peak	Spacewatch	NYS	780 m	MPC · JPL
676034	2016 CV_{173}	—	January 15, 2005	Kitt Peak	Spacewatch	EOS	2.1 km	MPC · JPL
676035	2016 CC_{175}	—	January 4, 2012	Kitt Peak	Spacewatch	·	1.1 km	MPC · JPL
676036	2016 CK_{175}	—	September 29, 2003	Kitt Peak	Spacewatch	·	2.5 km	MPC · JPL
676037	2016 CC_{181}	—	July 16, 2013	Haleakala	Pan-STARRS 1	·	1.1 km	MPC · JPL
676038	2016 CG_{182}	—	December 12, 2015	Haleakala	Pan-STARRS 1	·	970 m	MPC · JPL
676039	2016 CD_{185}	—	June 19, 2013	Mount Lemmon	Mount Lemmon Survey	·	3.2 km	MPC · JPL
676040	2016 CV_{189}	—	January 18, 2016	Haleakala	Pan-STARRS 1	·	1.1 km	MPC · JPL
676041	2016 CE_{190}	—	October 12, 2007	Kitt Peak	Spacewatch	·	1.1 km	MPC · JPL
676042	2016 CS_{191}	—	December 7, 2015	Haleakala	Pan-STARRS 1	H	450 m	MPC · JPL
676043	2016 CP_{192}	—	January 29, 2009	Mount Lemmon	Mount Lemmon Survey	·	1.0 km	MPC · JPL
676044	2016 CX_{192}	—	October 29, 2014	Haleakala	Pan-STARRS 1	VER	3.1 km	MPC · JPL
676045	2016 CD_{193}	—	January 1, 2016	Haleakala	Pan-STARRS 1	H	370 m	MPC · JPL
676046	2016 CQ_{194}	—	February 11, 2016	Haleakala	Pan-STARRS 1	H	380 m	MPC · JPL
676047	2016 CV_{195}	—	March 11, 2005	Kitt Peak	Spacewatch	NYS	830 m	MPC · JPL
676048	2016 CJ_{197}	—	January 21, 2016	Haleakala	Pan-STARRS 1	·	960 m	MPC · JPL
676049	2016 CG_{201}	—	April 25, 2006	Kitt Peak	Spacewatch	·	2.8 km	MPC · JPL
676050	2016 CV_{201}	—	January 8, 2016	Haleakala	Pan-STARRS 1	HNS	880 m	MPC · JPL
676051	2016 CS_{204}	—	February 9, 2016	Haleakala	Pan-STARRS 1	·	1.2 km	MPC · JPL
676052	2016 CW_{208}	—	March 26, 2011	Mount Lemmon	Mount Lemmon Survey	·	2.9 km	MPC · JPL
676053	2016 CK_{209}	—	February 7, 2008	Kitt Peak	Spacewatch	·	810 m	MPC · JPL
676054	2016 CT_{211}	—	December 9, 2015	Haleakala	Pan-STARRS 1	·	3.3 km	MPC · JPL
676055	2016 CQ_{216}	—	June 24, 2009	Mount Lemmon	Mount Lemmon Survey	·	1.2 km	MPC · JPL
676056	2016 CJ_{219}	—	March 27, 2012	Kitt Peak	Spacewatch	·	1.2 km	MPC · JPL
676057	2016 CD_{221}	—	February 9, 2016	Haleakala	Pan-STARRS 1	·	950 m	MPC · JPL
676058	2016 CD_{222}	—	February 4, 2016	Haleakala	Pan-STARRS 1	·	1.0 km	MPC · JPL
676059	2016 CV_{224}	—	September 23, 2008	Mount Lemmon	Mount Lemmon Survey	·	3.1 km	MPC · JPL
676060	2016 CO_{227}	—	October 20, 1998	Kitt Peak	Spacewatch	·	2.3 km	MPC · JPL
676061	2016 CU_{232}	—	January 31, 2016	Haleakala	Pan-STARRS 1	·	830 m	MPC · JPL
676062	2016 CV_{239}	—	October 26, 1995	Kitt Peak	Spacewatch	PHO	850 m	MPC · JPL
676063	2016 CK_{241}	—	November 27, 2014	Haleakala	Pan-STARRS 1	MAR	890 m	MPC · JPL
676064	2016 CA_{242}	—	August 31, 2014	Haleakala	Pan-STARRS 1	·	1.4 km	MPC · JPL
676065	2016 CK_{247}	—	January 13, 2016	Mount Lemmon	Mount Lemmon Survey	H	470 m	MPC · JPL
676066	2016 CF_{248}	—	September 27, 1998	Socorro	LINEAR	·	640 m	MPC · JPL
676067	2016 CL_{252}	—	January 16, 2005	Kitt Peak	Spacewatch	·	3.1 km	MPC · JPL
676068	2016 CJ_{253}	—	November 8, 2007	Kitt Peak	Spacewatch	·	1.1 km	MPC · JPL
676069	2016 CZ_{254}	—	January 12, 2016	Haleakala	Pan-STARRS 1	H	470 m	MPC · JPL
676070	2016 CP_{256}	—	August 27, 2009	Kitt Peak	Spacewatch	·	1.9 km	MPC · JPL
676071	2016 CJ_{260}	—	February 11, 2016	Haleakala	Pan-STARRS 1	·	1.0 km	MPC · JPL
676072	2016 CT_{260}	—	November 1, 2005	Kitt Peak	Spacewatch	·	1.1 km	MPC · JPL
676073	2016 CD_{262}	—	December 29, 2011	Kitt Peak	Spacewatch	·	1.2 km	MPC · JPL
676074	2016 CG_{263}	—	January 19, 2016	Haleakala	Pan-STARRS 1	H	480 m	MPC · JPL
676075	2016 CH_{264}	—	October 14, 2010	Mount Lemmon	Mount Lemmon Survey	·	1.1 km	MPC · JPL
676076	2016 CE_{265}	—	July 8, 2014	Haleakala	Pan-STARRS 1	H	400 m	MPC · JPL
676077	2016 CY_{265}	—	September 18, 2009	Kitt Peak	Spacewatch	H	390 m	MPC · JPL
676078	2016 CL_{266}	—	September 24, 2014	Mount Lemmon	Mount Lemmon Survey	H	320 m	MPC · JPL
676079	2016 CQ_{266}	—	February 1, 2016	Haleakala	Pan-STARRS 1	H	570 m	MPC · JPL
676080	2016 CH_{267}	—	February 10, 2016	Haleakala	Pan-STARRS 1	H	400 m	MPC · JPL
676081	2016 CD_{270}	—	February 4, 2016	Haleakala	Pan-STARRS 1	BRG	1.1 km	MPC · JPL
676082	2016 CT_{271}	—	February 5, 2016	Haleakala	Pan-STARRS 1	·	740 m	MPC · JPL
676083	2016 CU_{271}	—	February 5, 2016	Haleakala	Pan-STARRS 1	PHO	760 m	MPC · JPL
676084	2016 CC_{272}	—	February 5, 2016	Haleakala	Pan-STARRS 1	·	2.3 km	MPC · JPL
676085	2016 CM_{274}	—	February 10, 2016	Haleakala	Pan-STARRS 1	HNS	880 m	MPC · JPL
676086	2016 CC_{275}	—	August 29, 2009	Kitt Peak	Spacewatch	·	1.4 km	MPC · JPL
676087	2016 CD_{275}	—	February 10, 2016	Haleakala	Pan-STARRS 1	·	870 m	MPC · JPL
676088	2016 CJ_{275}	—	February 10, 2016	Haleakala	Pan-STARRS 1	·	980 m	MPC · JPL
676089	2016 CQ_{277}	—	February 14, 2016	Haleakala	Pan-STARRS 1	·	1.3 km	MPC · JPL
676090	2016 CE_{280}	—	November 5, 2005	Mount Lemmon	Mount Lemmon Survey	·	1.7 km	MPC · JPL
676091	2016 CA_{282}	—	February 11, 2016	Haleakala	Pan-STARRS 1	·	1.3 km	MPC · JPL
676092	2016 CF_{282}	—	February 14, 2016	Haleakala	Pan-STARRS 1	·	1.0 km	MPC · JPL
676093	2016 CA_{286}	—	February 11, 2016	Haleakala	Pan-STARRS 1	·	1.1 km	MPC · JPL
676094	2016 CG_{286}	—	July 30, 2008	Catalina	CSS	JUN	1.1 km	MPC · JPL
676095	2016 CV_{286}	—	January 17, 2015	Haleakala	Pan-STARRS 1	VER	2.8 km	MPC · JPL
676096	2016 CS_{289}	—	January 27, 2012	Mount Lemmon	Mount Lemmon Survey	NYS	1.0 km	MPC · JPL
676097	2016 CJ_{290}	—	January 14, 2011	Mount Lemmon	Mount Lemmon Survey	·	1.1 km	MPC · JPL
676098	2016 CY_{290}	—	February 14, 2016	Haleakala	Pan-STARRS 1	·	1.4 km	MPC · JPL
676099	2016 CF_{291}	—	November 18, 2009	Mount Lemmon	Mount Lemmon Survey	·	2.2 km	MPC · JPL
676100	2016 CQ_{292}	—	April 26, 2001	Kitt Peak	Spacewatch	NYS	1.0 km	MPC · JPL

== 676101–676200 ==
back to top

Designation			Discovery			Properties		Ref
Permanent	Provisional	Named after	Date	Site	Discoverer(s)	Category	Diam.	Ref
676101	2016 CA_{297}	—	November 25, 2002	Palomar	NEAT	·	1.2 km	MPC · JPL
676102	2016 CU_{297}	—	May 28, 2012	Mount Lemmon	Mount Lemmon Survey	·	1.1 km	MPC · JPL
676103	2016 CV_{298}	—	September 3, 2010	Mount Lemmon	Mount Lemmon Survey	MAR	720 m	MPC · JPL
676104	2016 CX_{299}	—	September 22, 2014	Haleakala	Pan-STARRS 1	·	870 m	MPC · JPL
676105	2016 CF_{300}	—	February 16, 2004	Kitt Peak	Spacewatch	·	760 m	MPC · JPL
676106	2016 CM_{303}	—	February 5, 2016	Haleakala	Pan-STARRS 1	·	920 m	MPC · JPL
676107	2016 CL_{307}	—	February 27, 2012	Haleakala	Pan-STARRS 1	KON	1.4 km	MPC · JPL
676108	2016 CD_{308}	—	February 27, 2012	Kitt Peak	Spacewatch	·	1.1 km	MPC · JPL
676109	2016 CL_{308}	—	February 23, 2012	Mount Lemmon	Mount Lemmon Survey	·	860 m	MPC · JPL
676110	2016 CP_{308}	—	November 26, 2014	Haleakala	Pan-STARRS 1	·	2.4 km	MPC · JPL
676111	2016 CB_{309}	—	September 22, 2014	Kitt Peak	Spacewatch	EUN	870 m	MPC · JPL
676112	2016 CR_{310}	—	January 26, 2012	Mount Lemmon	Mount Lemmon Survey	·	1.1 km	MPC · JPL
676113	2016 CM_{313}	—	August 31, 2005	Kitt Peak	Spacewatch	·	1.4 km	MPC · JPL
676114	2016 CY_{313}	—	February 10, 2016	Haleakala	Pan-STARRS 1	EUN	800 m	MPC · JPL
676115	2016 CZ_{313}	—	September 1, 2013	Mount Lemmon	Mount Lemmon Survey	·	870 m	MPC · JPL
676116	2016 CY_{314}	—	November 26, 2014	Haleakala	Pan-STARRS 1	HNS	880 m	MPC · JPL
676117	2016 CO_{320}	—	February 10, 2011	Mount Lemmon	Mount Lemmon Survey	·	1.6 km	MPC · JPL
676118	2016 CP_{320}	—	February 11, 2016	Haleakala	Pan-STARRS 1	·	1.1 km	MPC · JPL
676119	2016 CB_{322}	—	January 27, 2015	Haleakala	Pan-STARRS 1	·	2.4 km	MPC · JPL
676120	2016 CP_{324}	—	February 9, 2016	Haleakala	Pan-STARRS 1	3:2	4.2 km	MPC · JPL
676121	2016 CX_{324}	—	February 14, 2016	Haleakala	Pan-STARRS 1	·	1.4 km	MPC · JPL
676122	2016 CS_{325}	—	February 14, 2016	Haleakala	Pan-STARRS 1	PHO	960 m	MPC · JPL
676123	2016 CU_{325}	—	February 12, 2016	Haleakala	Pan-STARRS 1	·	1.1 km	MPC · JPL
676124	2016 CD_{326}	—	February 11, 2016	Haleakala	Pan-STARRS 1	H	340 m	MPC · JPL
676125	2016 CU_{326}	—	February 12, 2016	Mount Lemmon	Mount Lemmon Survey	EUN	790 m	MPC · JPL
676126	2016 CY_{329}	—	February 10, 2016	Haleakala	Pan-STARRS 1	·	720 m	MPC · JPL
676127	2016 CL_{330}	—	February 11, 2016	Haleakala	Pan-STARRS 1	·	1.2 km	MPC · JPL
676128	2016 CQ_{332}	—	February 5, 2016	Haleakala	Pan-STARRS 1	MAR	760 m	MPC · JPL
676129	2016 CY_{335}	—	February 9, 2016	Haleakala	Pan-STARRS 1	EUN	850 m	MPC · JPL
676130	2016 CB_{342}	—	February 12, 2016	Haleakala	Pan-STARRS 1	·	1.1 km	MPC · JPL
676131	2016 CP_{342}	—	February 10, 2016	Haleakala	Pan-STARRS 1	·	660 m	MPC · JPL
676132	2016 CB_{344}	—	February 5, 2016	Haleakala	Pan-STARRS 1	V	540 m	MPC · JPL
676133	2016 CX_{346}	—	February 11, 2016	Haleakala	Pan-STARRS 1	·	860 m	MPC · JPL
676134	2016 CU_{347}	—	September 1, 2013	Mount Lemmon	Mount Lemmon Survey	MAR	880 m	MPC · JPL
676135	2016 CB_{349}	—	February 10, 2016	Haleakala	Pan-STARRS 1	·	920 m	MPC · JPL
676136	2016 CR_{358}	—	February 5, 2016	Haleakala	Pan-STARRS 1	VER	2.0 km	MPC · JPL
676137	2016 CH_{369}	—	January 20, 2015	Haleakala	Pan-STARRS 1	3:2	4.1 km	MPC · JPL
676138	2016 CT_{387}	—	February 12, 2016	Kitt Peak	Spacewatch	MAR	790 m	MPC · JPL
676139	2016 CO_{388}	—	February 28, 2008	Kitt Peak	Spacewatch	·	700 m	MPC · JPL
676140	2016 DT	—	January 17, 2013	Mount Lemmon	Mount Lemmon Survey	H	450 m	MPC · JPL
676141	2016 DA_{1}	—	August 10, 2004	Socorro	LINEAR	H	480 m	MPC · JPL
676142	2016 DN_{1}	—	January 14, 2008	Kitt Peak	Spacewatch	H	430 m	MPC · JPL
676143	2016 DE_{2}	—	February 29, 2016	Haleakala	Pan-STARRS 1	H	570 m	MPC · JPL
676144	2016 DH_{4}	—	December 25, 2011	Mount Lemmon	Mount Lemmon Survey	·	1.4 km	MPC · JPL
676145	2016 DT_{5}	—	January 8, 2016	Haleakala	Pan-STARRS 1	·	1.2 km	MPC · JPL
676146	2016 DX_{5}	—	February 5, 2016	Haleakala	Pan-STARRS 1	·	2.9 km	MPC · JPL
676147	2016 DH_{6}	—	September 26, 2003	Apache Point	SDSS Collaboration	·	2.8 km	MPC · JPL
676148	2016 DM_{7}	—	February 13, 2008	Kitt Peak	Spacewatch	·	770 m	MPC · JPL
676149	2016 DY_{7}	—	October 13, 2010	Mount Lemmon	Mount Lemmon Survey	·	1.2 km	MPC · JPL
676150	2016 DT_{8}	—	January 3, 2016	Haleakala	Pan-STARRS 1	BAR	1.1 km	MPC · JPL
676151	2016 DV_{17}	—	March 16, 2012	Haleakala	Pan-STARRS 1	·	1.1 km	MPC · JPL
676152	2016 DE_{18}	—	April 13, 2012	Haleakala	Pan-STARRS 1	·	860 m	MPC · JPL
676153	2016 DM_{18}	—	January 19, 2012	Haleakala	Pan-STARRS 1	·	960 m	MPC · JPL
676154	2016 DK_{20}	—	February 27, 2012	Haleakala	Pan-STARRS 1	·	660 m	MPC · JPL
676155	2016 DU_{20}	—	April 30, 2011	Haleakala	Pan-STARRS 1	·	3.2 km	MPC · JPL
676156	2016 DG_{21}	—	February 28, 2016	Mount Lemmon	Mount Lemmon Survey	VER	2.3 km	MPC · JPL
676157	2016 DQ_{21}	—	February 10, 2016	Haleakala	Pan-STARRS 1	·	920 m	MPC · JPL
676158	2016 DF_{23}	—	April 16, 2009	Catalina	CSS	·	1.0 km	MPC · JPL
676159	2016 DY_{24}	—	November 5, 2010	Mount Lemmon	Mount Lemmon Survey	·	1.2 km	MPC · JPL
676160	2016 DD_{25}	—	April 10, 2000	Kitt Peak	M. W. Buie	·	3.6 km	MPC · JPL
676161	2016 DL_{25}	—	February 27, 2016	Mount Lemmon	Mount Lemmon Survey	MAR	740 m	MPC · JPL
676162	2016 DL_{28}	—	November 21, 2014	Haleakala	Pan-STARRS 1	·	2.3 km	MPC · JPL
676163	2016 DE_{32}	—	February 28, 2016	Haleakala	Pan-STARRS 1	·	1.1 km	MPC · JPL
676164	2016 DN_{33}	—	March 15, 2012	Mount Lemmon	Mount Lemmon Survey	MAR	920 m	MPC · JPL
676165	2016 DF_{42}	—	July 12, 2013	Haleakala	Pan-STARRS 1	MAR	780 m	MPC · JPL
676166	2016 ED_{2}	—	December 30, 2011	Kitt Peak	Spacewatch	·	1.0 km	MPC · JPL
676167	2016 EF_{2}	—	September 6, 2004	Goodricke-Pigott	R. A. Tucker	H	520 m	MPC · JPL
676168	2016 EJ_{11}	—	March 3, 2016	Haleakala	Pan-STARRS 1	·	1.3 km	MPC · JPL
676169	2016 EP_{13}	—	April 24, 2006	Kitt Peak	Spacewatch	·	3.0 km	MPC · JPL
676170	2016 EM_{14}	—	October 31, 2010	Mount Lemmon	Mount Lemmon Survey	·	1.4 km	MPC · JPL
676171	2016 EN_{14}	—	November 16, 2014	Haleakala	Pan-STARRS 1	MAR	860 m	MPC · JPL
676172	2016 EO_{14}	—	December 11, 2014	Mount Lemmon	Mount Lemmon Survey	·	1.3 km	MPC · JPL
676173	2016 EJ_{18}	—	February 11, 2016	Haleakala	Pan-STARRS 1	EUN	950 m	MPC · JPL
676174	2016 EC_{19}	—	October 21, 2006	Kitt Peak	Spacewatch	·	1.1 km	MPC · JPL
676175	2016 ET_{19}	—	July 13, 2013	Mount Lemmon	Mount Lemmon Survey	·	1.2 km	MPC · JPL
676176	2016 EO_{20}	—	February 12, 2016	Haleakala	Pan-STARRS 1	HNS	840 m	MPC · JPL
676177	2016 ER_{20}	—	March 3, 2016	Haleakala	Pan-STARRS 1	EUN	800 m	MPC · JPL
676178	2016 EX_{20}	—	November 16, 2014	Mount Lemmon	Mount Lemmon Survey	·	1.1 km	MPC · JPL
676179	2016 ER_{21}	—	March 3, 2016	Haleakala	Pan-STARRS 1	·	1.1 km	MPC · JPL
676180	2016 ET_{22}	—	February 12, 2016	Haleakala	Pan-STARRS 1	·	1.1 km	MPC · JPL
676181	2016 EE_{23}	—	October 4, 2013	Mount Lemmon	Mount Lemmon Survey	·	1.7 km	MPC · JPL
676182	2016 EM_{23}	—	March 3, 2016	Haleakala	Pan-STARRS 1	H	320 m	MPC · JPL
676183	2016 EQ_{23}	—	June 10, 2013	Mount Lemmon	Mount Lemmon Survey	·	1.7 km	MPC · JPL
676184	2016 EB_{24}	—	March 3, 2016	Haleakala	Pan-STARRS 1	EUN	710 m	MPC · JPL
676185	2016 EO_{24}	—	November 26, 2014	Haleakala	Pan-STARRS 1	·	1.4 km	MPC · JPL
676186	2016 EV_{26}	—	March 3, 2016	Haleakala	Pan-STARRS 1	·	3.2 km	MPC · JPL
676187	2016 EC_{29}	—	March 6, 2011	Kitt Peak	Spacewatch	H	350 m	MPC · JPL
676188	2016 EZ_{29}	—	February 19, 2002	Cima Ekar	ADAS	H	440 m	MPC · JPL
676189	2016 EN_{30}	—	June 10, 2013	Mount Lemmon	Mount Lemmon Survey	·	1.4 km	MPC · JPL
676190	2016 EX_{30}	—	February 20, 2012	Haleakala	Pan-STARRS 1	·	690 m	MPC · JPL
676191	2016 EL_{32}	—	September 22, 2014	Haleakala	Pan-STARRS 1	HNS	840 m	MPC · JPL
676192	2016 EP_{32}	—	November 21, 2014	Haleakala	Pan-STARRS 1	URS	3.9 km	MPC · JPL
676193	2016 EO_{35}	—	October 30, 2008	Catalina	CSS	·	3.4 km	MPC · JPL
676194	2016 EW_{36}	—	March 3, 2016	Haleakala	Pan-STARRS 1	·	850 m	MPC · JPL
676195	2016 EU_{39}	—	October 8, 2008	Kitt Peak	Spacewatch	·	2.6 km	MPC · JPL
676196	2016 EH_{40}	—	June 30, 2014	Haleakala	Pan-STARRS 1	H	370 m	MPC · JPL
676197	2016 EL_{40}	—	September 1, 2014	Mount Lemmon	Mount Lemmon Survey	·	770 m	MPC · JPL
676198	2016 ES_{40}	—	December 17, 2015	Mount Lemmon	Mount Lemmon Survey	H	410 m	MPC · JPL
676199	2016 EY_{40}	—	December 12, 2015	Haleakala	Pan-STARRS 1	·	1.2 km	MPC · JPL
676200	2016 EG_{41}	—	September 6, 2014	Catalina	CSS	·	930 m	MPC · JPL

== 676201–676300 ==
back to top

Designation			Discovery			Properties		Ref
Permanent	Provisional	Named after	Date	Site	Discoverer(s)	Category	Diam.	Ref
676201	2016 EK_{43}	—	October 10, 2010	Mount Lemmon	Mount Lemmon Survey	·	1.2 km	MPC · JPL
676202	2016 EY_{44}	—	November 25, 2014	Mount Lemmon	Mount Lemmon Survey	·	3.2 km	MPC · JPL
676203	2016 EM_{47}	—	July 7, 2014	Haleakala	Pan-STARRS 1	·	1.2 km	MPC · JPL
676204	2016 EE_{48}	—	October 12, 2014	Haleakala	Pan-STARRS 1	EUN	860 m	MPC · JPL
676205	2016 EO_{49}	—	April 29, 2012	Mount Lemmon	Mount Lemmon Survey	·	1.7 km	MPC · JPL
676206	2016 EA_{51}	—	March 4, 2016	Haleakala	Pan-STARRS 1	·	1.2 km	MPC · JPL
676207	2016 EM_{55}	—	March 29, 2008	Catalina	CSS	H	640 m	MPC · JPL
676208	2016 ED_{56}	—	March 7, 2016	Haleakala	Pan-STARRS 1	H	470 m	MPC · JPL
676209	2016 EA_{58}	—	August 30, 2014	Mount Lemmon	Mount Lemmon Survey	MAR	840 m	MPC · JPL
676210	2016 EX_{58}	—	February 23, 2012	Mount Graham	Boyle, R. P., V. Laugalys	·	880 m	MPC · JPL
676211	2016 EO_{59}	—	March 4, 2012	Mount Lemmon	Mount Lemmon Survey	·	940 m	MPC · JPL
676212	2016 ET_{59}	—	November 30, 2005	Kitt Peak	Spacewatch	·	1.7 km	MPC · JPL
676213	2016 EB_{61}	—	February 4, 2016	Haleakala	Pan-STARRS 1	MAR	730 m	MPC · JPL
676214	2016 ES_{61}	—	January 9, 2016	Haleakala	Pan-STARRS 1	EUN	900 m	MPC · JPL
676215	2016 EY_{62}	—	January 9, 2016	Haleakala	Pan-STARRS 1	·	1.3 km	MPC · JPL
676216	2016 EM_{64}	—	November 17, 2014	Haleakala	Pan-STARRS 1	·	1.7 km	MPC · JPL
676217	2016 ES_{70}	—	February 3, 2016	Haleakala	Pan-STARRS 1	·	1.2 km	MPC · JPL
676218	2016 EL_{72}	—	April 4, 2008	Catalina	CSS	H	460 m	MPC · JPL
676219	2016 EV_{72}	—	January 28, 2003	Palomar	NEAT	JUN	1.1 km	MPC · JPL
676220	2016 EQ_{73}	—	March 25, 2003	Anderson Mesa	LONEOS	·	1.8 km	MPC · JPL
676221	2016 EE_{74}	—	March 16, 2012	Haleakala	Pan-STARRS 1	·	1.4 km	MPC · JPL
676222	2016 EO_{74}	—	October 1, 2014	Haleakala	Pan-STARRS 1	·	900 m	MPC · JPL
676223	2016 EC_{76}	—	March 11, 2005	Mount Lemmon	Mount Lemmon Survey	·	900 m	MPC · JPL
676224	2016 EA_{79}	—	October 4, 2006	Mount Lemmon	Mount Lemmon Survey	H	510 m	MPC · JPL
676225	2016 EA_{80}	—	November 22, 2006	Mount Lemmon	Mount Lemmon Survey	·	1.3 km	MPC · JPL
676226	2016 EO_{80}	—	December 15, 2007	Catalina	CSS	·	1.2 km	MPC · JPL
676227	2016 EH_{81}	—	December 31, 2007	Mount Lemmon	Mount Lemmon Survey	·	1.1 km	MPC · JPL
676228	2016 EN_{81}	—	October 21, 2003	Kitt Peak	Spacewatch	·	2.5 km	MPC · JPL
676229	2016 ET_{82}	—	January 11, 2010	Kitt Peak	Spacewatch	·	2.8 km	MPC · JPL
676230	2016 EW_{82}	—	April 6, 2011	Mount Lemmon	Mount Lemmon Survey	·	2.9 km	MPC · JPL
676231	2016 EY_{85}	—	September 19, 2006	Anderson Mesa	LONEOS	H	480 m	MPC · JPL
676232	2016 ED_{88}	—	July 12, 2013	Haleakala	Pan-STARRS 1	·	1.5 km	MPC · JPL
676233	2016 EK_{100}	—	March 7, 2016	Haleakala	Pan-STARRS 1	·	2.2 km	MPC · JPL
676234	2016 EE_{103}	—	January 27, 2011	Mount Lemmon	Mount Lemmon Survey	·	1.5 km	MPC · JPL
676235	2016 EH_{108}	—	March 26, 2003	Kitt Peak	Spacewatch	·	1.1 km	MPC · JPL
676236	2016 EP_{109}	—	January 8, 2010	Kitt Peak	Spacewatch	·	2.1 km	MPC · JPL
676237	2016 EX_{115}	—	August 17, 2013	Haleakala	Pan-STARRS 1	T_{j} (2.98)	3.3 km	MPC · JPL
676238	2016 EJ_{118}	—	March 1, 2016	Haleakala	Pan-STARRS 1	H	330 m	MPC · JPL
676239	2016 EO_{118}	—	February 26, 2012	Haleakala	Pan-STARRS 1	·	710 m	MPC · JPL
676240	2016 ET_{120}	—	January 2, 2012	Mount Lemmon	Mount Lemmon Survey	·	1.1 km	MPC · JPL
676241	2016 ED_{123}	—	February 27, 2012	Haleakala	Pan-STARRS 1	·	740 m	MPC · JPL
676242	2016 EY_{123}	—	March 24, 2012	Kitt Peak	Spacewatch	·	1.3 km	MPC · JPL
676243	2016 EH_{124}	—	January 18, 2016	Haleakala	Pan-STARRS 1	·	1.0 km	MPC · JPL
676244	2016 EG_{128}	—	November 27, 2014	Haleakala	Pan-STARRS 1	·	1.0 km	MPC · JPL
676245	2016 EY_{129}	—	October 4, 2002	Palomar	NEAT	·	1.4 km	MPC · JPL
676246	2016 EH_{131}	—	March 10, 2016	Haleakala	Pan-STARRS 1	·	1.3 km	MPC · JPL
676247	2016 EX_{132}	—	November 1, 2002	Palomar	NEAT	·	980 m	MPC · JPL
676248	2016 EO_{133}	—	November 29, 2014	Mount Lemmon	Mount Lemmon Survey	MAR	800 m	MPC · JPL
676249	2016 ET_{133}	—	November 18, 2006	Mount Lemmon	Mount Lemmon Survey	3:2	5.3 km	MPC · JPL
676250	2016 EW_{133}	—	March 28, 2012	Mount Lemmon	Mount Lemmon Survey	·	1.1 km	MPC · JPL
676251	2016 ES_{137}	—	April 15, 2012	Haleakala	Pan-STARRS 1	·	890 m	MPC · JPL
676252	2016 ER_{139}	—	January 18, 2016	Haleakala	Pan-STARRS 1	EUN	730 m	MPC · JPL
676253	2016 ED_{142}	—	January 18, 2016	Haleakala	Pan-STARRS 1	·	840 m	MPC · JPL
676254	2016 EQ_{147}	—	March 5, 2008	Mount Lemmon	Mount Lemmon Survey	H	380 m	MPC · JPL
676255	2016 EK_{149}	—	October 29, 2014	Haleakala	Pan-STARRS 1	EUN	780 m	MPC · JPL
676256	2016 EM_{150}	—	October 17, 2009	Mount Lemmon	Mount Lemmon Survey	HNS	950 m	MPC · JPL
676257	2016 EV_{150}	—	March 10, 2016	Haleakala	Pan-STARRS 1	·	860 m	MPC · JPL
676258	2016 ET_{151}	—	April 14, 2008	Kitt Peak	Spacewatch	·	950 m	MPC · JPL
676259	2016 EL_{152}	—	October 20, 2006	Kitt Peak	Deep Ecliptic Survey	·	1.0 km	MPC · JPL
676260	2016 EA_{156}	—	January 8, 2016	Haleakala	Pan-STARRS 1	H	410 m	MPC · JPL
676261	2016 EE_{156}	—	March 12, 2016	Catalina	CSS	T_{j} (2.74) · APO +1km	2.0 km	MPC · JPL
676262	2016 EC_{162}	—	March 6, 2008	Kitt Peak	Spacewatch	·	670 m	MPC · JPL
676263	2016 EH_{163}	—	August 27, 2001	Palomar	NEAT	·	2.4 km	MPC · JPL
676264	2016 EJ_{166}	—	March 11, 2016	Haleakala	Pan-STARRS 1	EOS	1.3 km	MPC · JPL
676265	2016 EW_{172}	—	January 17, 2016	Haleakala	Pan-STARRS 1	EUN	1.0 km	MPC · JPL
676266	2016 ED_{173}	—	March 17, 2012	Mount Lemmon	Mount Lemmon Survey	·	580 m	MPC · JPL
676267	2016 EJ_{174}	—	November 26, 2014	Haleakala	Pan-STARRS 1	MAR	810 m	MPC · JPL
676268	2016 EQ_{174}	—	February 28, 2016	Haleakala	Pan-STARRS 1	·	1.9 km	MPC · JPL
676269	2016 EA_{175}	—	February 7, 2011	Mount Lemmon	Mount Lemmon Survey	·	3.2 km	MPC · JPL
676270	2016 EW_{176}	—	October 5, 2013	Haleakala	Pan-STARRS 1	EOS	1.2 km	MPC · JPL
676271	2016 EM_{177}	—	November 30, 2003	Kitt Peak	Spacewatch	·	1.0 km	MPC · JPL
676272	2016 ER_{177}	—	February 12, 2016	Haleakala	Pan-STARRS 1	BAR	880 m	MPC · JPL
676273	2016 EW_{177}	—	March 12, 2016	Haleakala	Pan-STARRS 1	·	880 m	MPC · JPL
676274	2016 EX_{178}	—	October 1, 2014	Haleakala	Pan-STARRS 1	·	1.0 km	MPC · JPL
676275	2016 EF_{180}	—	October 1, 2013	Mount Lemmon	Mount Lemmon Survey	EUN	810 m	MPC · JPL
676276	2016 ER_{184}	—	November 23, 2006	Mount Lemmon	Mount Lemmon Survey	·	1.2 km	MPC · JPL
676277	2016 EJ_{187}	—	February 28, 2016	Haleakala	Pan-STARRS 1	H	480 m	MPC · JPL
676278	2016 ER_{191}	—	October 10, 2002	Palomar	NEAT	VER	2.6 km	MPC · JPL
676279	2016 EC_{193}	—	February 10, 2016	Haleakala	Pan-STARRS 1	HNS	1.0 km	MPC · JPL
676280	2016 EV_{193}	—	March 22, 2012	Catalina	CSS	·	1.3 km	MPC · JPL
676281	2016 EH_{195}	—	February 4, 2016	Haleakala	Pan-STARRS 1	EUN	1.1 km	MPC · JPL
676282	2016 EL_{195}	—	October 24, 2004	Kitt Peak	Spacewatch	H	380 m	MPC · JPL
676283	2016 EF_{204}	—	September 16, 2014	Haleakala	Pan-STARRS 1	H	390 m	MPC · JPL
676284	2016 EK_{204}	—	August 4, 2014	Cala d'Hort	I. de la Cueva, J. L. Ferrer	H	370 m	MPC · JPL
676285	2016 EN_{204}	—	March 3, 2016	Mount Lemmon	Mount Lemmon Survey	3:2	3.2 km	MPC · JPL
676286	2016 ET_{204}	—	September 12, 2014	Haleakala	Pan-STARRS 1	H	390 m	MPC · JPL
676287	2016 EC_{205}	—	April 21, 2011	Haleakala	Pan-STARRS 1	H	400 m	MPC · JPL
676288	2016 EJ_{206}	—	March 4, 2016	Haleakala	Pan-STARRS 1	H	370 m	MPC · JPL
676289	2016 EC_{209}	—	March 4, 2016	Haleakala	Pan-STARRS 1	·	1.1 km	MPC · JPL
676290	2016 EK_{209}	—	June 14, 2012	Mount Lemmon	Mount Lemmon Survey	EUN	810 m	MPC · JPL
676291	2016 EV_{211}	—	April 20, 2012	Kitt Peak	Spacewatch	·	1.1 km	MPC · JPL
676292	2016 ES_{212}	—	March 10, 2016	Haleakala	Pan-STARRS 1	·	1.2 km	MPC · JPL
676293	2016 ED_{217}	—	August 28, 2005	Anderson Mesa	LONEOS	·	1.4 km	MPC · JPL
676294	2016 EH_{217}	—	December 24, 2014	Mount Lemmon	Mount Lemmon Survey	·	1.1 km	MPC · JPL
676295	2016 EO_{222}	—	December 14, 2010	Mount Lemmon	Mount Lemmon Survey	·	1.4 km	MPC · JPL
676296	2016 ER_{222}	—	March 11, 2008	Mount Lemmon	Mount Lemmon Survey	·	770 m	MPC · JPL
676297	2016 ER_{223}	—	April 30, 2012	Kitt Peak	Spacewatch	·	850 m	MPC · JPL
676298	2016 EY_{226}	—	March 7, 2016	Haleakala	Pan-STARRS 1	·	1.2 km	MPC · JPL
676299	2016 EH_{228}	—	March 10, 2007	Mount Lemmon	Mount Lemmon Survey	·	1.4 km	MPC · JPL
676300	2016 EP_{228}	—	March 7, 2016	Haleakala	Pan-STARRS 1	·	1.4 km	MPC · JPL

== 676301–676400 ==
back to top

Designation			Discovery			Properties		Ref
Permanent	Provisional	Named after	Date	Site	Discoverer(s)	Category	Diam.	Ref
676301	2016 EG_{229}	—	April 7, 2003	Kitt Peak	Spacewatch	·	1.1 km	MPC · JPL
676302	2016 EC_{231}	—	March 2, 2016	Haleakala	Pan-STARRS 1	·	1.0 km	MPC · JPL
676303	2016 ES_{231}	—	March 3, 2016	Haleakala	Pan-STARRS 1	BRG	980 m	MPC · JPL
676304	2016 EJ_{232}	—	March 4, 2016	Haleakala	Pan-STARRS 1	·	750 m	MPC · JPL
676305	2016 EJ_{235}	—	May 12, 2012	Mount Lemmon	Mount Lemmon Survey	·	990 m	MPC · JPL
676306	2016 EW_{235}	—	April 28, 2012	Mount Lemmon	Mount Lemmon Survey	·	770 m	MPC · JPL
676307	2016 EF_{236}	—	January 13, 2015	Haleakala	Pan-STARRS 1	·	1.2 km	MPC · JPL
676308	2016 EH_{236}	—	December 16, 2014	Haleakala	Pan-STARRS 1	HNS	970 m	MPC · JPL
676309	2016 EO_{237}	—	March 6, 2016	Haleakala	Pan-STARRS 1	HNS	920 m	MPC · JPL
676310	2016 EK_{238}	—	March 27, 2012	Mount Lemmon	Mount Lemmon Survey	·	1.2 km	MPC · JPL
676311	2016 EO_{238}	—	June 9, 2013	Oukaïmeden	M. Ory	·	1.1 km	MPC · JPL
676312	2016 EG_{239}	—	March 7, 2016	Haleakala	Pan-STARRS 1	·	1.5 km	MPC · JPL
676313	2016 EB_{240}	—	June 18, 2012	Mount Lemmon	Mount Lemmon Survey	·	2.0 km	MPC · JPL
676314	2016 EX_{245}	—	November 26, 2014	Haleakala	Pan-STARRS 1	·	990 m	MPC · JPL
676315	2016 EN_{248}	—	November 25, 2014	Haleakala	Pan-STARRS 1	·	1.1 km	MPC · JPL
676316	2016 ED_{249}	—	March 15, 2016	Haleakala	Pan-STARRS 1	·	1.1 km	MPC · JPL
676317	2016 EE_{250}	—	March 4, 2016	Haleakala	Pan-STARRS 1	H	440 m	MPC · JPL
676318	2016 EH_{250}	—	March 4, 2016	Haleakala	Pan-STARRS 1	·	1.4 km	MPC · JPL
676319	2016 EP_{250}	—	October 17, 2006	Catalina	CSS	T_{j} (2.99)	2.5 km	MPC · JPL
676320	2016 EW_{250}	—	March 7, 2016	Haleakala	Pan-STARRS 1	JUN	970 m	MPC · JPL
676321	2016 EZ_{250}	—	June 27, 2011	Mount Lemmon	Mount Lemmon Survey	·	2.6 km	MPC · JPL
676322	2016 EN_{251}	—	March 10, 2016	Haleakala	Pan-STARRS 1	·	860 m	MPC · JPL
676323	2016 EA_{252}	—	March 4, 2016	Haleakala	Pan-STARRS 1	JUN	890 m	MPC · JPL
676324	2016 ER_{252}	—	March 7, 2016	Haleakala	Pan-STARRS 1	EUN	920 m	MPC · JPL
676325	2016 EQ_{253}	—	March 4, 2016	Haleakala	Pan-STARRS 1	·	1.7 km	MPC · JPL
676326	2016 ED_{254}	—	March 5, 2016	Haleakala	Pan-STARRS 1	·	1.4 km	MPC · JPL
676327	2016 EJ_{254}	—	March 5, 2016	Haleakala	Pan-STARRS 1	·	940 m	MPC · JPL
676328	2016 EO_{254}	—	March 7, 2016	Haleakala	Pan-STARRS 1	·	1.0 km	MPC · JPL
676329	2016 EG_{255}	—	February 3, 2016	Haleakala	Pan-STARRS 1	·	1.5 km	MPC · JPL
676330	2016 EZ_{257}	—	March 1, 2016	Mount Lemmon	Mount Lemmon Survey	H	340 m	MPC · JPL
676331	2016 ES_{258}	—	November 17, 2014	Catalina	CSS	·	1 km	MPC · JPL
676332	2016 EU_{265}	—	March 14, 2016	Mount Lemmon	Mount Lemmon Survey	·	850 m	MPC · JPL
676333	2016 EN_{266}	—	February 8, 2011	Mount Lemmon	Mount Lemmon Survey	EUN	770 m	MPC · JPL
676334	2016 EU_{266}	—	March 10, 2016	Haleakala	Pan-STARRS 1	·	810 m	MPC · JPL
676335	2016 EY_{266}	—	March 3, 2016	Haleakala	Pan-STARRS 1	EUN	1.1 km	MPC · JPL
676336	2016 EJ_{267}	—	March 10, 2016	Haleakala	Pan-STARRS 1	·	940 m	MPC · JPL
676337	2016 EY_{267}	—	March 10, 2016	Haleakala	Pan-STARRS 1	·	900 m	MPC · JPL
676338	2016 EJ_{269}	—	March 4, 2016	Haleakala	Pan-STARRS 1	·	1 km	MPC · JPL
676339	2016 EZ_{269}	—	March 4, 2016	Haleakala	Pan-STARRS 1	HNS	650 m	MPC · JPL
676340	2016 EL_{276}	—	March 15, 2016	Mount Lemmon	Mount Lemmon Survey	·	1.1 km	MPC · JPL
676341	2016 EY_{277}	—	March 10, 2016	Haleakala	Pan-STARRS 1	·	820 m	MPC · JPL
676342	2016 EX_{282}	—	March 15, 2016	Haleakala	Pan-STARRS 1	·	1.6 km	MPC · JPL
676343	2016 EA_{283}	—	March 8, 2016	Haleakala	Pan-STARRS 1	·	1.5 km	MPC · JPL
676344	2016 EQ_{283}	—	March 10, 2016	Haleakala	Pan-STARRS 1	·	700 m	MPC · JPL
676345	2016 EF_{284}	—	November 8, 2013	Mount Lemmon	Mount Lemmon Survey	·	1.2 km	MPC · JPL
676346	2016 EX_{288}	—	March 14, 2016	Mount Lemmon	Mount Lemmon Survey	DOR	2.1 km	MPC · JPL
676347	2016 EE_{296}	—	July 29, 2009	Kitt Peak	Spacewatch	·	1.1 km	MPC · JPL
676348	2016 EN_{299}	—	March 15, 2016	Haleakala	Pan-STARRS 1	L4	8.0 km	MPC · JPL
676349	2016 EK_{300}	—	March 4, 2016	Haleakala	Pan-STARRS 1	·	1.3 km	MPC · JPL
676350	2016 EU_{303}	—	March 3, 2016	Haleakala	Pan-STARRS 1	JUN	720 m	MPC · JPL
676351	2016 EN_{319}	—	March 4, 2016	Haleakala	Pan-STARRS 1	·	1.3 km	MPC · JPL
676352	2016 FF	—	November 20, 2009	Mount Lemmon	Mount Lemmon Survey	H	530 m	MPC · JPL
676353	2016 FV	—	September 30, 2009	Mount Lemmon	Mount Lemmon Survey	HNS	1.0 km	MPC · JPL
676354	2016 FN_{1}	—	September 26, 2005	Kitt Peak	Spacewatch	·	1.1 km	MPC · JPL
676355	2016 FV_{2}	—	March 29, 2008	Kitt Peak	Spacewatch	·	1.2 km	MPC · JPL
676356	2016 FZ_{3}	—	March 20, 2016	Haleakala	Pan-STARRS 1	H	460 m	MPC · JPL
676357	2016 FJ_{7}	—	March 26, 2003	Palomar	NEAT	·	700 m	MPC · JPL
676358	2016 FP_{8}	—	October 23, 2006	Mount Lemmon	Mount Lemmon Survey	·	890 m	MPC · JPL
676359	2016 FD_{9}	—	July 20, 2004	Siding Spring	SSS	·	1.4 km	MPC · JPL
676360	2016 FR_{9}	—	March 27, 2012	Kitt Peak	Spacewatch	EUN	840 m	MPC · JPL
676361	2016 FO_{11}	—	May 14, 2012	Haleakala	Pan-STARRS 1	·	1.1 km	MPC · JPL
676362	2016 FG_{15}	—	February 6, 2016	Mount Lemmon	Mount Lemmon Survey	APO	690 m	MPC · JPL
676363	2016 FC_{20}	—	April 3, 2005	Palomar	NEAT	·	1.2 km	MPC · JPL
676364	2016 FX_{20}	—	May 8, 2008	Kitt Peak	Spacewatch	·	900 m	MPC · JPL
676365	2016 FH_{22}	—	October 25, 2014	Haleakala	Pan-STARRS 1	ADE	1.5 km	MPC · JPL
676366	2016 FU_{22}	—	February 9, 2016	Haleakala	Pan-STARRS 1	EUN	750 m	MPC · JPL
676367	2016 FX_{24}	—	August 20, 2014	Haleakala	Pan-STARRS 1	H	390 m	MPC · JPL
676368	2016 FN_{25}	—	April 25, 2012	Kitt Peak	Spacewatch	·	970 m	MPC · JPL
676369	2016 FA_{26}	—	March 10, 2016	Haleakala	Pan-STARRS 1	KON	1.7 km	MPC · JPL
676370	2016 FJ_{26}	—	February 18, 2008	Mount Lemmon	Mount Lemmon Survey	T_{j} (2.99) · 3:2	5.1 km	MPC · JPL
676371	2016 FE_{27}	—	March 31, 2016	Mount Lemmon	Mount Lemmon Survey	·	700 m	MPC · JPL
676372	2016 FV_{27}	—	March 31, 2012	Kitt Peak	Spacewatch	·	1.5 km	MPC · JPL
676373	2016 FD_{34}	—	November 3, 2010	Kitt Peak	Spacewatch	·	1.2 km	MPC · JPL
676374	2016 FW_{34}	—	November 30, 2014	Haleakala	Pan-STARRS 1	MAR	800 m	MPC · JPL
676375	2016 FZ_{37}	—	March 17, 2016	Haleakala	Pan-STARRS 1	·	1.6 km	MPC · JPL
676376	2016 FK_{38}	—	March 29, 2012	Kitt Peak	Spacewatch	·	950 m	MPC · JPL
676377	2016 FU_{41}	—	May 13, 2011	Mount Lemmon	Mount Lemmon Survey	·	3.2 km	MPC · JPL
676378	2016 FO_{42}	—	February 11, 2008	Mount Lemmon	Mount Lemmon Survey	·	1.6 km	MPC · JPL
676379	2016 FL_{43}	—	October 30, 2014	Mount Lemmon	Mount Lemmon Survey	·	1.4 km	MPC · JPL
676380	2016 FJ_{47}	—	March 31, 2016	Kitt Peak	Spacewatch	·	830 m	MPC · JPL
676381	2016 FN_{47}	—	March 10, 2016	Haleakala	Pan-STARRS 1	·	980 m	MPC · JPL
676382	2016 FD_{51}	—	August 2, 2008	Siding Spring	SSS	JUN	900 m	MPC · JPL
676383	2016 FM_{51}	—	April 15, 2012	Haleakala	Pan-STARRS 1	·	990 m	MPC · JPL
676384	2016 FW_{52}	—	June 18, 2013	Haleakala	Pan-STARRS 1	·	1.1 km	MPC · JPL
676385	2016 FY_{52}	—	October 14, 2014	Mount Lemmon	Mount Lemmon Survey	·	1.2 km	MPC · JPL
676386	2016 FC_{54}	—	August 9, 2005	Cerro Tololo	Deep Ecliptic Survey	·	890 m	MPC · JPL
676387	2016 FF_{60}	—	November 22, 2014	Mount Lemmon	Mount Lemmon Survey	·	2.2 km	MPC · JPL
676388	2016 FD_{61}	—	November 24, 2006	Kitt Peak	Spacewatch	H	390 m	MPC · JPL
676389	2016 FF_{61}	—	September 18, 2006	Catalina	CSS	H	460 m	MPC · JPL
676390	2016 FS_{69}	—	March 17, 2016	Haleakala	Pan-STARRS 1	·	610 m	MPC · JPL
676391	2016 FE_{70}	—	March 30, 2016	Haleakala	Pan-STARRS 1	·	1.6 km	MPC · JPL
676392	2016 FP_{70}	—	March 31, 2016	Haleakala	Pan-STARRS 1	·	1.2 km	MPC · JPL
676393	2016 FY_{71}	—	March 17, 2016	Haleakala	Pan-STARRS 1	·	930 m	MPC · JPL
676394	2016 FC_{73}	—	March 18, 2016	Haleakala	Pan-STARRS 1	·	1.5 km	MPC · JPL
676395	2016 FX_{74}	—	March 28, 2016	Mount Lemmon	Mount Lemmon Survey	MAR	680 m	MPC · JPL
676396	2016 FW_{79}	—	March 16, 2016	Haleakala	Pan-STARRS 1	MAR	890 m	MPC · JPL
676397	2016 GQ	—	March 7, 2016	Haleakala	Pan-STARRS 1	·	1.1 km	MPC · JPL
676398	2016 GD_{3}	—	April 9, 2003	Kitt Peak	Spacewatch	H	390 m	MPC · JPL
676399	2016 GG_{3}	—	September 17, 2006	Catalina	CSS	H	390 m	MPC · JPL
676400	2016 GO_{3}	—	February 4, 2000	Kitt Peak	Spacewatch	·	1.2 km	MPC · JPL

== 676401–676500 ==
back to top

Designation			Discovery			Properties		Ref
Permanent	Provisional	Named after	Date	Site	Discoverer(s)	Category	Diam.	Ref
676401	2016 GC_{6}	—	September 1, 2013	Mount Lemmon	Mount Lemmon Survey	·	1.2 km	MPC · JPL
676402	2016 GY_{6}	—	October 20, 2014	Mount Lemmon	Mount Lemmon Survey	·	900 m	MPC · JPL
676403	2016 GZ_{13}	—	September 10, 2007	Kitt Peak	Spacewatch	EOS	1.8 km	MPC · JPL
676404	2016 GF_{15}	—	May 3, 2011	Bergisch Gladbach	W. Bickel	TIR	2.8 km	MPC · JPL
676405	2016 GC_{16}	—	March 10, 2016	Haleakala	Pan-STARRS 1	·	900 m	MPC · JPL
676406	2016 GX_{16}	—	December 7, 2014	Haleakala	Pan-STARRS 1	HNS	890 m	MPC · JPL
676407	2016 GU_{18}	—	March 10, 2016	Haleakala	Pan-STARRS 1	·	1.1 km	MPC · JPL
676408	2016 GL_{21}	—	March 13, 2016	Haleakala	Pan-STARRS 1	·	1.2 km	MPC · JPL
676409	2016 GL_{22}	—	November 17, 2006	Kitt Peak	Spacewatch	(5)	720 m	MPC · JPL
676410	2016 GD_{31}	—	March 11, 2016	Haleakala	Pan-STARRS 1	·	990 m	MPC · JPL
676411	2016 GR_{32}	—	March 29, 2008	Mount Lemmon	Mount Lemmon Survey	3:2 · SHU	3.4 km	MPC · JPL
676412	2016 GZ_{32}	—	October 26, 2014	Mount Lemmon	Mount Lemmon Survey	·	780 m	MPC · JPL
676413	2016 GJ_{34}	—	March 30, 2012	Mount Lemmon	Mount Lemmon Survey	·	870 m	MPC · JPL
676414	2016 GE_{37}	—	August 15, 2013	Haleakala	Pan-STARRS 1	·	1.3 km	MPC · JPL
676415	2016 GZ_{37}	—	September 20, 2006	Kitt Peak	Spacewatch	·	1.0 km	MPC · JPL
676416	2016 GN_{40}	—	December 2, 2010	Kitt Peak	Spacewatch	·	960 m	MPC · JPL
676417	2016 GD_{44}	—	March 28, 2012	Kitt Peak	Spacewatch	·	1.2 km	MPC · JPL
676418	2016 GK_{54}	—	March 4, 2016	Haleakala	Pan-STARRS 1	·	810 m	MPC · JPL
676419	2016 GH_{55}	—	April 1, 2016	Haleakala	Pan-STARRS 1	·	1.1 km	MPC · JPL
676420	2016 GA_{56}	—	March 28, 2016	Mount Lemmon	Mount Lemmon Survey	·	1.3 km	MPC · JPL
676421	2016 GJ_{58}	—	November 5, 2010	Mount Lemmon	Mount Lemmon Survey	·	1.0 km	MPC · JPL
676422	2016 GM_{58}	—	November 16, 2014	Mount Lemmon	Mount Lemmon Survey	(5)	1.0 km	MPC · JPL
676423	2016 GF_{61}	—	March 13, 2016	Haleakala	Pan-STARRS 1	·	1.2 km	MPC · JPL
676424	2016 GL_{64}	—	April 18, 2012	Mount Lemmon	Mount Lemmon Survey	·	800 m	MPC · JPL
676425	2016 GM_{64}	—	May 15, 2012	Haleakala	Pan-STARRS 1	·	950 m	MPC · JPL
676426	2016 GD_{67}	—	March 10, 2008	Kitt Peak	Spacewatch	·	780 m	MPC · JPL
676427	2016 GJ_{68}	—	March 25, 2012	Mount Lemmon	Mount Lemmon Survey	·	1.2 km	MPC · JPL
676428	2016 GU_{68}	—	September 26, 2009	Mount Lemmon	Mount Lemmon Survey	·	1.3 km	MPC · JPL
676429	2016 GJ_{70}	—	December 10, 2014	Mount Lemmon	Mount Lemmon Survey	·	830 m	MPC · JPL
676430	2016 GP_{70}	—	November 29, 2014	Mount Lemmon	Mount Lemmon Survey	·	1.1 km	MPC · JPL
676431	2016 GP_{71}	—	September 21, 2009	Mount Lemmon	Mount Lemmon Survey	·	1.4 km	MPC · JPL
676432	2016 GR_{81}	—	September 30, 2005	Mount Lemmon	Mount Lemmon Survey	·	1.1 km	MPC · JPL
676433	2016 GF_{83}	—	April 1, 2016	Haleakala	Pan-STARRS 1	NYS	1 km	MPC · JPL
676434	2016 GH_{87}	—	July 14, 2013	Haleakala	Pan-STARRS 1	·	1.1 km	MPC · JPL
676435	2016 GY_{91}	—	September 3, 2013	Mount Lemmon	Mount Lemmon Survey	·	680 m	MPC · JPL
676436	2016 GW_{93}	—	February 11, 2016	Haleakala	Pan-STARRS 1	·	910 m	MPC · JPL
676437	2016 GL_{95}	—	November 6, 2005	Mount Lemmon	Mount Lemmon Survey	·	1.3 km	MPC · JPL
676438	2016 GA_{97}	—	October 20, 2003	Kitt Peak	Spacewatch	·	820 m	MPC · JPL
676439	2016 GJ_{97}	—	January 27, 2011	Mount Lemmon	Mount Lemmon Survey	·	1.2 km	MPC · JPL
676440	2016 GB_{102}	—	April 1, 2016	Haleakala	Pan-STARRS 1	·	600 m	MPC · JPL
676441	2016 GP_{115}	—	September 6, 2008	Catalina	CSS	·	930 m	MPC · JPL
676442	2016 GM_{118}	—	April 1, 2016	Haleakala	Pan-STARRS 1	(5)	1.0 km	MPC · JPL
676443	2016 GE_{124}	—	March 27, 2003	Palomar	NEAT	EUN	1.2 km	MPC · JPL
676444	2016 GJ_{125}	—	March 4, 2016	Haleakala	Pan-STARRS 1	EUN	1.1 km	MPC · JPL
676445	2016 GD_{126}	—	April 13, 2012	Mount Lemmon	Mount Lemmon Survey	MAR	940 m	MPC · JPL
676446	2016 GX_{129}	—	March 20, 2012	Haleakala	Pan-STARRS 1	·	830 m	MPC · JPL
676447	2016 GJ_{130}	—	February 23, 1998	Kitt Peak	Spacewatch	·	860 m	MPC · JPL
676448	2016 GB_{137}	—	November 14, 2010	Mount Lemmon	Mount Lemmon Survey	·	1.1 km	MPC · JPL
676449	2016 GG_{137}	—	April 13, 2008	Kitt Peak	Spacewatch	·	850 m	MPC · JPL
676450	2016 GE_{141}	—	October 1, 2008	Catalina	CSS	·	1.5 km	MPC · JPL
676451	2016 GW_{141}	—	January 19, 2016	Haleakala	Pan-STARRS 1	·	1.3 km	MPC · JPL
676452	2016 GW_{145}	—	August 17, 2013	Haleakala	Pan-STARRS 1	·	970 m	MPC · JPL
676453	2016 GA_{148}	—	November 14, 2007	Kitt Peak	Spacewatch	·	810 m	MPC · JPL
676454	2016 GL_{155}	—	December 19, 2009	Mount Lemmon	Mount Lemmon Survey	·	3.1 km	MPC · JPL
676455	2016 GU_{155}	—	September 17, 2006	Kitt Peak	Spacewatch	·	1.2 km	MPC · JPL
676456	2016 GA_{164}	—	September 25, 2005	Kitt Peak	Spacewatch	·	1.6 km	MPC · JPL
676457	2016 GN_{164}	—	November 13, 2010	Mount Lemmon	Mount Lemmon Survey	L4	6.2 km	MPC · JPL
676458	2016 GS_{168}	—	February 11, 2011	Mount Lemmon	Mount Lemmon Survey	·	1.4 km	MPC · JPL
676459	2016 GN_{175}	—	February 26, 2011	Catalina	CSS	·	1.9 km	MPC · JPL
676460	2016 GG_{176}	—	February 11, 2016	Haleakala	Pan-STARRS 1	·	1.1 km	MPC · JPL
676461	2016 GA_{178}	—	February 11, 2016	Haleakala	Pan-STARRS 1	·	770 m	MPC · JPL
676462	2016 GO_{179}	—	March 6, 2016	Haleakala	Pan-STARRS 1	H	430 m	MPC · JPL
676463	2016 GY_{180}	—	April 3, 2016	Haleakala	Pan-STARRS 1	·	1.2 km	MPC · JPL
676464	2016 GV_{183}	—	October 12, 2013	Mount Lemmon	Mount Lemmon Survey	WIT	830 m	MPC · JPL
676465	2016 GY_{183}	—	October 27, 2009	Mount Lemmon	Mount Lemmon Survey	·	1.3 km	MPC · JPL
676466	2016 GN_{184}	—	April 3, 2016	Haleakala	Pan-STARRS 1	·	1.4 km	MPC · JPL
676467	2016 GJ_{187}	—	November 22, 2014	Haleakala	Pan-STARRS 1	·	890 m	MPC · JPL
676468	2016 GZ_{189}	—	November 26, 2014	Haleakala	Pan-STARRS 1	MAR	900 m	MPC · JPL
676469	2016 GT_{190}	—	June 16, 2012	Mount Lemmon	Mount Lemmon Survey	·	1.0 km	MPC · JPL
676470	2016 GB_{200}	—	May 3, 2008	Kitt Peak	Spacewatch	·	1.1 km	MPC · JPL
676471	2016 GS_{200}	—	April 4, 2016	Mount Lemmon	Mount Lemmon Survey	·	1.8 km	MPC · JPL
676472	2016 GK_{201}	—	October 11, 2007	Catalina	CSS	·	790 m	MPC · JPL
676473	2016 GL_{207}	—	March 19, 2009	Calar Alto	F. Hormuth	·	1 km	MPC · JPL
676474	2016 GG_{209}	—	April 14, 2008	Mount Lemmon	Mount Lemmon Survey	·	700 m	MPC · JPL
676475	2016 GU_{210}	—	March 27, 2008	Mount Lemmon	Mount Lemmon Survey	3:2	3.7 km	MPC · JPL
676476	2016 GG_{214}	—	November 30, 2014	Haleakala	Pan-STARRS 1	EUN	800 m	MPC · JPL
676477	2016 GW_{214}	—	March 2, 2011	Mount Lemmon	Mount Lemmon Survey	HNS	730 m	MPC · JPL
676478	2016 GL_{215}	—	April 21, 2012	Mount Lemmon	Mount Lemmon Survey	·	1.5 km	MPC · JPL
676479	2016 GW_{215}	—	October 2, 2013	Haleakala	Pan-STARRS 1	HNS	830 m	MPC · JPL
676480	2016 GZ_{215}	—	February 11, 2016	Haleakala	Pan-STARRS 1	AMO	220 m	MPC · JPL
676481	2016 GT_{216}	—	February 8, 2013	Mayhill-ISON	L. Elenin	H	570 m	MPC · JPL
676482	2016 GL_{217}	—	January 17, 2016	Haleakala	Pan-STARRS 1	·	1.7 km	MPC · JPL
676483	2016 GF_{219}	—	July 15, 2012	Mayhill-ISON	L. Elenin	·	1.6 km	MPC · JPL
676484	2016 GR_{221}	—	February 15, 2013	Haleakala	Pan-STARRS 1	H	460 m	MPC · JPL
676485	2016 GY_{222}	—	March 23, 2003	Apache Point	SDSS Collaboration	KON	2.3 km	MPC · JPL
676486	2016 GK_{223}	—	March 10, 2016	Haleakala	Pan-STARRS 1	JUN	720 m	MPC · JPL
676487	2016 GV_{223}	—	October 9, 2013	Mount Lemmon	Mount Lemmon Survey	·	1.5 km	MPC · JPL
676488	2016 GR_{225}	—	April 15, 2012	Haleakala	Pan-STARRS 1	EUN	1.0 km	MPC · JPL
676489	2016 GP_{226}	—	May 1, 2012	Mount Lemmon	Mount Lemmon Survey	·	870 m	MPC · JPL
676490	2016 GZ_{226}	—	March 19, 2009	Kitt Peak	Spacewatch	·	690 m	MPC · JPL
676491	2016 GE_{227}	—	May 1, 2012	Mount Lemmon	Mount Lemmon Survey	·	1.2 km	MPC · JPL
676492	2016 GP_{227}	—	April 30, 2008	Mount Lemmon	Mount Lemmon Survey	HNS	850 m	MPC · JPL
676493	2016 GE_{228}	—	November 21, 2006	Mount Lemmon	Mount Lemmon Survey	·	970 m	MPC · JPL
676494	2016 GR_{228}	—	April 3, 2016	Haleakala	Pan-STARRS 1	·	960 m	MPC · JPL
676495	2016 GG_{232}	—	February 1, 2011	Piszkés-tető	K. Sárneczky, Z. Kuli	ADE	1.9 km	MPC · JPL
676496	2016 GB_{233}	—	June 8, 2012	Mount Lemmon	Mount Lemmon Survey	RAF	700 m	MPC · JPL
676497	2016 GR_{235}	—	January 20, 2015	Mount Lemmon	Mount Lemmon Survey	·	1.5 km	MPC · JPL
676498	2016 GC_{238}	—	April 14, 2016	Haleakala	Pan-STARRS 1	·	890 m	MPC · JPL
676499	2016 GE_{238}	—	January 21, 2015	Haleakala	Pan-STARRS 1	·	1.0 km	MPC · JPL
676500	2016 GT_{239}	—	December 14, 2010	Mount Lemmon	Mount Lemmon Survey	·	1.1 km	MPC · JPL

== 676501–676600 ==
back to top

Designation			Discovery			Properties		Ref
Permanent	Provisional	Named after	Date	Site	Discoverer(s)	Category	Diam.	Ref
676501	2016 GY_{239}	—	February 27, 2011	La Sagra	OAM	GAL	1.4 km	MPC · JPL
676502	2016 GY_{241}	—	November 1, 2013	Mount Lemmon	Mount Lemmon Survey	BRG	1.3 km	MPC · JPL
676503	2016 GD_{245}	—	April 3, 2016	Haleakala	Pan-STARRS 1	·	1.1 km	MPC · JPL
676504	2016 GT_{246}	—	January 19, 2007	Mauna Kea	P. A. Wiegert	·	920 m	MPC · JPL
676505	2016 GP_{247}	—	April 5, 2016	Haleakala	Pan-STARRS 1	·	520 m	MPC · JPL
676506	2016 GZ_{247}	—	April 15, 2012	Haleakala	Pan-STARRS 1	·	810 m	MPC · JPL
676507	2016 GC_{248}	—	April 3, 2016	Haleakala	Pan-STARRS 1	·	940 m	MPC · JPL
676508	2016 GT_{251}	—	March 4, 2016	Haleakala	Pan-STARRS 1	·	1.1 km	MPC · JPL
676509	2016 GP_{255}	—	March 10, 2007	Kitt Peak	Spacewatch	EUN	890 m	MPC · JPL
676510	2016 GK_{257}	—	May 16, 2012	Mount Lemmon	Mount Lemmon Survey	(5)	850 m	MPC · JPL
676511	2016 GZ_{257}	—	April 10, 2016	Haleakala	Pan-STARRS 1	EUN	800 m	MPC · JPL
676512	2016 GW_{259}	—	October 11, 1999	Kitt Peak	Spacewatch	·	2.0 km	MPC · JPL
676513	2016 GF_{260}	—	December 10, 2009	Mount Lemmon	Mount Lemmon Survey	·	1.9 km	MPC · JPL
676514	2016 GQ_{261}	—	February 10, 2011	Mount Lemmon	Mount Lemmon Survey	·	1.4 km	MPC · JPL
676515	2016 GV_{261}	—	May 21, 2012	Mount Lemmon	Mount Lemmon Survey	·	820 m	MPC · JPL
676516	2016 GU_{263}	—	April 4, 2016	Haleakala	Pan-STARRS 1	·	1.3 km	MPC · JPL
676517	2016 GZ_{263}	—	December 12, 2014	Haleakala	Pan-STARRS 1	KON	2.1 km	MPC · JPL
676518	2016 GS_{264}	—	May 13, 2012	Mount Lemmon	Mount Lemmon Survey	·	810 m	MPC · JPL
676519	2016 GX_{264}	—	October 3, 2013	Mount Lemmon	Mount Lemmon Survey	·	820 m	MPC · JPL
676520	2016 GN_{265}	—	April 10, 2016	Haleakala	Pan-STARRS 1	·	1.1 km	MPC · JPL
676521	2016 GD_{266}	—	November 4, 2013	Haleakala	Pan-STARRS 1	·	1.7 km	MPC · JPL
676522	2016 GV_{266}	—	August 12, 2013	Haleakala	Pan-STARRS 1	·	850 m	MPC · JPL
676523	2016 GC_{267}	—	April 12, 2016	Haleakala	Pan-STARRS 1	·	1.1 km	MPC · JPL
676524	2016 GP_{267}	—	May 29, 2012	Mount Lemmon	Mount Lemmon Survey	·	1.0 km	MPC · JPL
676525	2016 GR_{267}	—	April 15, 2016	Mount Lemmon	Mount Lemmon Survey	HNS	760 m	MPC · JPL
676526	2016 GJ_{268}	—	November 10, 2013	Mount Lemmon	Mount Lemmon Survey	·	2.2 km	MPC · JPL
676527	2016 GN_{268}	—	April 15, 2016	Haleakala	Pan-STARRS 1	·	1.7 km	MPC · JPL
676528	2016 GB_{269}	—	April 15, 2016	Haleakala	Pan-STARRS 1	(5)	1.1 km	MPC · JPL
676529	2016 GC_{269}	—	April 10, 2016	Haleakala	Pan-STARRS 1	H	380 m	MPC · JPL
676530	2016 GK_{269}	—	April 11, 2016	Haleakala	Pan-STARRS 1	·	1.9 km	MPC · JPL
676531	2016 GR_{269}	—	June 3, 2008	Mount Lemmon	Mount Lemmon Survey	·	1.0 km	MPC · JPL
676532	2016 GT_{271}	—	April 14, 2016	Haleakala	Pan-STARRS 1	·	1.1 km	MPC · JPL
676533	2016 GS_{272}	—	April 4, 2016	Haleakala	Pan-STARRS 1	·	1.2 km	MPC · JPL
676534	2016 GZ_{273}	—	March 15, 2007	Mount Lemmon	Mount Lemmon Survey	·	1.3 km	MPC · JPL
676535	2016 GV_{274}	—	August 19, 2001	Cerro Tololo	Deep Ecliptic Survey	·	860 m	MPC · JPL
676536	2016 GZ_{274}	—	April 1, 2016	Haleakala	Pan-STARRS 1	KON	1.9 km	MPC · JPL
676537	2016 GT_{275}	—	April 1, 2016	Haleakala	Pan-STARRS 1	·	1.3 km	MPC · JPL
676538	2016 GJ_{276}	—	April 3, 2016	Haleakala	Pan-STARRS 1	(194)	1.2 km	MPC · JPL
676539	2016 GQ_{277}	—	April 10, 2016	Haleakala	Pan-STARRS 1	L4	8.1 km	MPC · JPL
676540	2016 GB_{280}	—	April 1, 2016	Haleakala	Pan-STARRS 1	·	870 m	MPC · JPL
676541	2016 GQ_{280}	—	April 1, 2016	Haleakala	Pan-STARRS 1	·	1.2 km	MPC · JPL
676542	2016 GR_{280}	—	April 4, 2016	Haleakala	Pan-STARRS 1	·	1.2 km	MPC · JPL
676543	2016 GF_{281}	—	April 15, 2016	Haleakala	Pan-STARRS 1	EUN	860 m	MPC · JPL
676544	2016 GA_{283}	—	April 3, 2016	Haleakala	Pan-STARRS 1	V	520 m	MPC · JPL
676545	2016 GB_{286}	—	November 9, 2013	Mount Lemmon	Mount Lemmon Survey	·	1.7 km	MPC · JPL
676546	2016 GN_{288}	—	September 2, 2013	Palomar	Palomar Transient Factory	·	570 m	MPC · JPL
676547	2016 GR_{288}	—	April 10, 2016	Haleakala	Pan-STARRS 1	·	1.8 km	MPC · JPL
676548	2016 GA_{291}	—	April 10, 2016	Haleakala	Pan-STARRS 1	·	1.4 km	MPC · JPL
676549	2016 GZ_{291}	—	April 12, 2016	Haleakala	Pan-STARRS 1	·	1.0 km	MPC · JPL
676550	2016 GE_{304}	—	February 8, 2013	Haleakala	Pan-STARRS 1	L4	6.4 km	MPC · JPL
676551	2016 GU_{310}	—	November 8, 2010	Mount Lemmon	Mount Lemmon Survey	V	620 m	MPC · JPL
676552	2016 GD_{311}	—	April 1, 2016	Haleakala	Pan-STARRS 1	NYS	820 m	MPC · JPL
676553	2016 GT_{311}	—	April 10, 2016	Haleakala	Pan-STARRS 1	L4	7.3 km	MPC · JPL
676554	2016 HZ	—	October 5, 2013	Haleakala	Pan-STARRS 1	·	1.1 km	MPC · JPL
676555	2016 HL_{1}	—	September 14, 2007	Mount Lemmon	Mount Lemmon Survey	·	590 m	MPC · JPL
676556	2016 HL_{2}	—	November 19, 2006	Lulin	LUSS	H	570 m	MPC · JPL
676557	2016 HQ_{3}	—	August 12, 2012	Siding Spring	SSS	·	1.2 km	MPC · JPL
676558	2016 HV_{5}	—	May 1, 2003	Kitt Peak	Spacewatch	·	1.4 km	MPC · JPL
676559	2016 HZ_{10}	—	March 5, 2016	Haleakala	Pan-STARRS 1	·	1.0 km	MPC · JPL
676560	2016 HQ_{11}	—	October 17, 2010	Mount Lemmon	Mount Lemmon Survey	L4	8.4 km	MPC · JPL
676561	2016 HT_{11}	—	December 28, 2005	Kitt Peak	Spacewatch	·	1.7 km	MPC · JPL
676562	2016 HL_{13}	—	September 11, 2010	Mount Lemmon	Mount Lemmon Survey	·	880 m	MPC · JPL
676563	2016 HC_{19}	—	February 10, 2016	Haleakala	Pan-STARRS 1	·	1.4 km	MPC · JPL
676564	2016 HB_{23}	—	September 18, 2003	Palomar	NEAT	·	910 m	MPC · JPL
676565	2016 HD_{23}	—	October 3, 2013	Kitt Peak	Spacewatch	·	1.6 km	MPC · JPL
676566	2016 HR_{25}	—	January 20, 2015	Haleakala	Pan-STARRS 1	(5)	960 m	MPC · JPL
676567	2016 HU_{25}	—	January 14, 2011	Kitt Peak	Spacewatch	HNS	840 m	MPC · JPL
676568	2016 HA_{26}	—	April 3, 2008	Kitt Peak	Spacewatch	·	890 m	MPC · JPL
676569	2016 HP_{26}	—	April 16, 2016	Haleakala	Pan-STARRS 1	·	1.1 km	MPC · JPL
676570	2016 HQ_{26}	—	April 30, 2016	Kitt Peak	Spacewatch	·	1.2 km	MPC · JPL
676571	2016 HX_{26}	—	April 17, 2016	Haleakala	Pan-STARRS 1	EUN	910 m	MPC · JPL
676572	2016 HJ_{28}	—	April 30, 2016	Mount Lemmon	Mount Lemmon Survey	·	930 m	MPC · JPL
676573	2016 HN_{28}	—	April 27, 2016	Haleakala	Pan-STARRS 1	·	940 m	MPC · JPL
676574	2016 HU_{28}	—	April 27, 2016	Mount Lemmon	Mount Lemmon Survey	·	1.0 km	MPC · JPL
676575	2016 HG_{30}	—	April 27, 2016	Mount Lemmon	Mount Lemmon Survey	·	1.0 km	MPC · JPL
676576	2016 HC_{31}	—	April 30, 2016	Haleakala	Pan-STARRS 1	L4	7.3 km	MPC · JPL
676577	2016 HY_{33}	—	April 30, 2016	Haleakala	Pan-STARRS 1	HNS	760 m	MPC · JPL
676578	2016 HV_{34}	—	April 26, 2016	Haleakala	Pan-STARRS 1	(194)	1.6 km	MPC · JPL
676579	2016 JK	—	November 2, 2007	Kitt Peak	Spacewatch	·	660 m	MPC · JPL
676580	2016 JW_{1}	—	November 27, 2014	Haleakala	Pan-STARRS 1	·	990 m	MPC · JPL
676581	2016 JQ_{4}	—	October 6, 2005	Mount Lemmon	Mount Lemmon Survey	BRG	1.5 km	MPC · JPL
676582	2016 JG_{6}	—	March 15, 2016	Mount Lemmon	Mount Lemmon Survey	H	520 m	MPC · JPL
676583	2016 JW_{7}	—	August 3, 2004	Siding Spring	SSS	(5)	1.3 km	MPC · JPL
676584	2016 JO_{9}	—	March 6, 2003	Apache Point	SDSS Collaboration	BAR	810 m	MPC · JPL
676585	2016 JN_{11}	—	December 29, 2014	Mount Lemmon	Mount Lemmon Survey	·	1.5 km	MPC · JPL
676586	2016 JJ_{14}	—	April 10, 2016	Haleakala	Pan-STARRS 1	·	1.5 km	MPC · JPL
676587	2016 JQ_{15}	—	November 30, 2014	Haleakala	Pan-STARRS 1	·	1.3 km	MPC · JPL
676588	2016 JO_{16}	—	April 20, 2012	Mount Lemmon	Mount Lemmon Survey	·	850 m	MPC · JPL
676589	2016 JQ_{16}	—	April 27, 2016	Cerro Paranal	Altmann, M., Prusti, T.	(5)	890 m	MPC · JPL
676590	2016 JW_{17}	—	May 6, 2016	Mount Lemmon	Mount Lemmon Survey	H	470 m	MPC · JPL
676591	2016 JA_{19}	—	March 5, 2016	Haleakala	Pan-STARRS 1	·	1.3 km	MPC · JPL
676592	2016 JJ_{19}	—	January 17, 2015	Mount Lemmon	Mount Lemmon Survey	MAR	780 m	MPC · JPL
676593	2016 JG_{20}	—	March 10, 2016	Haleakala	Pan-STARRS 1	·	1.3 km	MPC · JPL
676594	2016 JV_{20}	—	May 22, 2012	Sandlot	G. Hug	·	920 m	MPC · JPL
676595	2016 JT_{21}	—	October 20, 2006	Kitt Peak	Spacewatch	V	760 m	MPC · JPL
676596	2016 JC_{23}	—	March 28, 2012	Mount Lemmon	Mount Lemmon Survey	·	1.2 km	MPC · JPL
676597	2016 JP_{24}	—	September 13, 2002	Anderson Mesa	LONEOS	·	1.7 km	MPC · JPL
676598	2016 JU_{32}	—	May 18, 2012	Mount Lemmon	Mount Lemmon Survey	HNS	910 m	MPC · JPL
676599	2016 JZ_{33}	—	August 30, 2014	Haleakala	Pan-STARRS 1	H	510 m	MPC · JPL
676600	2016 JM_{34}	—	May 3, 2003	Kitt Peak	Spacewatch	·	2.2 km	MPC · JPL

== 676601–676700 ==
back to top

Designation			Discovery			Properties		Ref
Permanent	Provisional	Named after	Date	Site	Discoverer(s)	Category	Diam.	Ref
676601	2016 JA_{36}	—	February 13, 2016	Haleakala	Pan-STARRS 1	·	1.5 km	MPC · JPL
676602	2016 JZ_{38}	—	August 30, 2014	Haleakala	Pan-STARRS 1	H	480 m	MPC · JPL
676603	2016 JK_{42}	—	May 4, 2016	Haleakala	Pan-STARRS 1	ADE	1.6 km	MPC · JPL
676604	2016 JL_{42}	—	May 4, 2016	Haleakala	Pan-STARRS 1	·	1.7 km	MPC · JPL
676605	2016 JZ_{42}	—	May 6, 2016	Haleakala	Pan-STARRS 1	JUN	790 m	MPC · JPL
676606	2016 JP_{45}	—	May 15, 2016	Haleakala	Pan-STARRS 1	·	1.2 km	MPC · JPL
676607	2016 JR_{45}	—	May 2, 2016	Mount Lemmon	Mount Lemmon Survey	·	970 m	MPC · JPL
676608	2016 JU_{45}	—	May 12, 2016	Cerro Paranal	Altmann, M., Prusti, T.	·	1.1 km	MPC · JPL
676609	2016 JK_{51}	—	May 2, 2016	Mount Lemmon	Mount Lemmon Survey	·	1.4 km	MPC · JPL
676610	2016 JD_{70}	—	November 1, 2013	Mount Lemmon	Mount Lemmon Survey	·	1.6 km	MPC · JPL
676611	2016 KP_{1}	—	March 19, 2016	Haleakala	Pan-STARRS 1	·	890 m	MPC · JPL
676612	2016 KQ_{1}	—	March 15, 2016	Haleakala	Pan-STARRS 1	·	1.4 km	MPC · JPL
676613	2016 KD_{3}	—	April 19, 1999	Kitt Peak	Spacewatch	·	1.7 km	MPC · JPL
676614	2016 KF_{3}	—	September 21, 2012	Mount Lemmon	Mount Lemmon Survey	·	2.1 km	MPC · JPL
676615	2016 KN_{6}	—	September 15, 2004	Anderson Mesa	LONEOS	·	1.2 km	MPC · JPL
676616	2016 KQ_{7}	—	April 14, 2016	Haleakala	Pan-STARRS 1	L4	6.7 km	MPC · JPL
676617	2016 KM_{8}	—	May 30, 2016	Haleakala	Pan-STARRS 1	·	1.1 km	MPC · JPL
676618	2016 KR_{8}	—	May 30, 2016	Haleakala	Pan-STARRS 1	·	1.2 km	MPC · JPL
676619	2016 KQ_{9}	—	January 29, 2015	Haleakala	Pan-STARRS 1	·	1.3 km	MPC · JPL
676620	2016 KK_{14}	—	May 30, 2016	Haleakala	Pan-STARRS 1	HNS	970 m	MPC · JPL
676621	2016 KX_{14}	—	December 3, 2013	Mount Lemmon	Mount Lemmon Survey	·	1.6 km	MPC · JPL
676622	2016 LH	—	October 20, 2006	Kitt Peak	Spacewatch	H	480 m	MPC · JPL
676623	2016 LK	—	November 25, 2009	Mount Lemmon	Mount Lemmon Survey	·	2.4 km	MPC · JPL
676624	2016 LC_{4}	—	May 19, 2012	Mount Lemmon	Mount Lemmon Survey	·	1.5 km	MPC · JPL
676625	2016 LG_{5}	—	October 13, 2013	Mount Lemmon	Mount Lemmon Survey	EUN	830 m	MPC · JPL
676626	2016 LW_{7}	—	June 4, 2016	Mount Lemmon	Mount Lemmon Survey	·	2.2 km	MPC · JPL
676627	2016 LY_{7}	—	August 20, 2008	Kitt Peak	Spacewatch	·	900 m	MPC · JPL
676628	2016 LZ_{7}	—	January 16, 2015	Haleakala	Pan-STARRS 1	MAR	780 m	MPC · JPL
676629	2016 LU_{8}	—	January 16, 2015	Haleakala	Pan-STARRS 1	·	1.6 km	MPC · JPL
676630	2016 LM_{12}	—	October 25, 2008	Mount Lemmon	Mount Lemmon Survey	·	1.5 km	MPC · JPL
676631	2016 LV_{12}	—	May 30, 2016	Haleakala	Pan-STARRS 1	·	1.3 km	MPC · JPL
676632	2016 LT_{14}	—	January 14, 2011	Kitt Peak	Spacewatch	ADE	1.5 km	MPC · JPL
676633	2016 LF_{17}	—	October 27, 2008	Mount Lemmon	Mount Lemmon Survey	·	1.8 km	MPC · JPL
676634	2016 LY_{17}	—	April 4, 2016	Haleakala	Pan-STARRS 1	·	1.2 km	MPC · JPL
676635	2016 LW_{18}	—	January 23, 2015	Haleakala	Pan-STARRS 1	·	970 m	MPC · JPL
676636	2016 LB_{19}	—	June 4, 2016	Mount Lemmon	Mount Lemmon Survey	·	1.8 km	MPC · JPL
676637	2016 LM_{21}	—	September 15, 2002	Palomar	NEAT	·	970 m	MPC · JPL
676638	2016 LV_{22}	—	April 13, 2011	Mount Lemmon	Mount Lemmon Survey	·	1.5 km	MPC · JPL
676639	2016 LX_{23}	—	June 5, 2016	Haleakala	Pan-STARRS 1	EUN	740 m	MPC · JPL
676640	2016 LK_{24}	—	May 21, 2012	Haleakala	Pan-STARRS 1	·	850 m	MPC · JPL
676641	2016 LQ_{27}	—	June 17, 2012	Mount Lemmon	Mount Lemmon Survey	·	1.5 km	MPC · JPL
676642	2016 LZ_{30}	—	January 20, 2015	Haleakala	Pan-STARRS 1	·	1.2 km	MPC · JPL
676643	2016 LB_{31}	—	June 5, 2016	Haleakala	Pan-STARRS 1	·	1.2 km	MPC · JPL
676644	2016 LT_{32}	—	January 23, 2015	Haleakala	Pan-STARRS 1	·	1.5 km	MPC · JPL
676645	2016 LP_{38}	—	May 30, 2016	Haleakala	Pan-STARRS 1	(5)	1.0 km	MPC · JPL
676646	2016 LP_{47}	—	January 24, 2007	Mount Lemmon	Mount Lemmon Survey	·	920 m	MPC · JPL
676647	2016 LU_{49}	—	April 24, 2012	Mount Lemmon	Mount Lemmon Survey	·	1.3 km	MPC · JPL
676648	2016 LV_{50}	—	June 9, 2016	Haleakala	Pan-STARRS 1	H	550 m	MPC · JPL
676649	2016 LX_{50}	—	September 18, 2010	Mount Lemmon	Mount Lemmon Survey	·	300 m	MPC · JPL
676650	2016 LD_{54}	—	June 5, 2016	Haleakala	Pan-STARRS 1	·	1.9 km	MPC · JPL
676651	2016 LZ_{54}	—	October 25, 2011	Haleakala	Pan-STARRS 1	·	2.0 km	MPC · JPL
676652	2016 LR_{55}	—	June 10, 2016	Haleakala	Pan-STARRS 1	·	3.2 km	MPC · JPL
676653	2016 LT_{55}	—	June 14, 2016	Mount Lemmon	Mount Lemmon Survey	(18466)	1.7 km	MPC · JPL
676654	2016 LZ_{57}	—	June 7, 2016	Haleakala	Pan-STARRS 1	·	1.8 km	MPC · JPL
676655	2016 LA_{59}	—	June 7, 2011	Mount Lemmon	Mount Lemmon Survey	·	1.4 km	MPC · JPL
676656	2016 LP_{62}	—	January 28, 2015	Haleakala	Pan-STARRS 1	TIN	850 m	MPC · JPL
676657	2016 LK_{63}	—	April 24, 2015	Haleakala	Pan-STARRS 1	·	1.8 km	MPC · JPL
676658	2016 LL_{63}	—	September 3, 2008	Kitt Peak	Spacewatch	·	790 m	MPC · JPL
676659	2016 LR_{64}	—	June 11, 2016	Mount Lemmon	Mount Lemmon Survey	EUN	1.0 km	MPC · JPL
676660	2016 LX_{69}	—	June 8, 2016	Haleakala	Pan-STARRS 1	·	1.5 km	MPC · JPL
676661	2016 LZ_{69}	—	June 8, 2016	Haleakala	Pan-STARRS 1	·	1.1 km	MPC · JPL
676662	2016 LQ_{73}	—	June 5, 2016	Haleakala	Pan-STARRS 1	·	1.5 km	MPC · JPL
676663	2016 LF_{75}	—	June 4, 2016	Mount Lemmon	Mount Lemmon Survey	HNS	1.0 km	MPC · JPL
676664	2016 LP_{76}	—	June 3, 2016	Haleakala	Pan-STARRS 1	·	1.6 km	MPC · JPL
676665	2016 LN_{77}	—	June 5, 2016	Mount Lemmon	Mount Lemmon Survey	·	1.1 km	MPC · JPL
676666	2016 LO_{80}	—	June 7, 2016	Haleakala	Pan-STARRS 1	·	1.3 km	MPC · JPL
676667	2016 LK_{81}	—	June 3, 2016	Haleakala	Pan-STARRS 1	L4	7.9 km	MPC · JPL
676668	2016 LZ_{91}	—	June 5, 2016	Haleakala	Pan-STARRS 1	·	1.6 km	MPC · JPL
676669	2016 LZ_{92}	—	June 7, 2016	Haleakala	Pan-STARRS 1	·	1.4 km	MPC · JPL
676670	2016 LZ_{94}	—	September 2, 1998	Kitt Peak	Spacewatch	·	1.2 km	MPC · JPL
676671	2016 MS_{1}	—	November 27, 2014	Haleakala	Pan-STARRS 1	·	1.1 km	MPC · JPL
676672	2016 MP_{3}	—	September 5, 2002	Socorro	LINEAR	WAT	1.5 km	MPC · JPL
676673	2016 MX_{3}	—	October 31, 2011	Mayhill-ISON	L. Elenin	·	2.6 km	MPC · JPL
676674	2016 MA_{5}	—	June 29, 2016	Haleakala	Pan-STARRS 1	H	430 m	MPC · JPL
676675	2016 MW_{6}	—	June 29, 2016	Haleakala	Pan-STARRS 1	·	1.7 km	MPC · JPL
676676	2016 MZ_{6}	—	June 23, 2016	Haleakala	Pan-STARRS 1	TIN	950 m	MPC · JPL
676677	2016 MC_{7}	—	February 16, 2015	Haleakala	Pan-STARRS 1	·	2.2 km	MPC · JPL
676678	2016 ND	—	August 16, 2012	Haleakala	Pan-STARRS 1	·	2.1 km	MPC · JPL
676679	2016 NY_{1}	—	June 9, 2007	Catalina	CSS	·	2.1 km	MPC · JPL
676680	2016 NN_{2}	—	August 23, 2008	Siding Spring	SSS	·	1.5 km	MPC · JPL
676681	2016 NN_{3}	—	September 17, 2006	Kitt Peak	Spacewatch	·	1.5 km	MPC · JPL
676682	2016 NY_{3}	—	September 22, 2008	Kitt Peak	Spacewatch	·	1.4 km	MPC · JPL
676683	2016 NW_{5}	—	February 19, 2009	Kitt Peak	Spacewatch	·	2.2 km	MPC · JPL
676684	2016 NZ_{7}	—	January 20, 2015	Haleakala	Pan-STARRS 1	·	2.1 km	MPC · JPL
676685	2016 NC_{8}	—	March 18, 2016	Haleakala	Pan-STARRS 1	JUN	740 m	MPC · JPL
676686	2016 NQ_{9}	—	February 9, 2010	Kitt Peak	Spacewatch	·	1.7 km	MPC · JPL
676687	2016 NJ_{10}	—	November 23, 2012	Kitt Peak	Spacewatch	·	1.5 km	MPC · JPL
676688	2016 NT_{11}	—	December 6, 2012	Mount Lemmon	Mount Lemmon Survey	·	1.7 km	MPC · JPL
676689	2016 NJ_{13}	—	May 10, 2003	Kitt Peak	Spacewatch	·	1.4 km	MPC · JPL
676690	2016 NF_{14}	—	January 26, 2015	Haleakala	Pan-STARRS 1	·	1.6 km	MPC · JPL
676691	2016 NH_{14}	—	August 18, 2009	Kitt Peak	Spacewatch	·	990 m	MPC · JPL
676692	2016 NP_{14}	—	January 13, 2011	Kitt Peak	Spacewatch	·	710 m	MPC · JPL
676693	2016 NT_{17}	—	March 24, 2015	Haleakala	Pan-STARRS 1	KRM	2.1 km	MPC · JPL
676694	2016 NJ_{18}	—	September 30, 2005	Anderson Mesa	LONEOS	·	1.3 km	MPC · JPL
676695	2016 ND_{20}	—	June 16, 2012	Haleakala	Pan-STARRS 1	JUN	980 m	MPC · JPL
676696	2016 NF_{20}	—	November 17, 2014	Mount Lemmon	Mount Lemmon Survey	·	1.2 km	MPC · JPL
676697	2016 NK_{20}	—	February 13, 2016	Haleakala	Pan-STARRS 1	·	1.4 km	MPC · JPL
676698	2016 NO_{20}	—	August 14, 2013	Haleakala	Pan-STARRS 1	(2076)	540 m	MPC · JPL
676699	2016 NL_{23}	—	August 8, 2007	Reedy Creek	J. Broughton	·	1.7 km	MPC · JPL
676700	2016 NE_{24}	—	July 7, 2016	Haleakala	Pan-STARRS 1	BRA	1.2 km	MPC · JPL

== 676701–676800 ==
back to top

Designation			Discovery			Properties		Ref
Permanent	Provisional	Named after	Date	Site	Discoverer(s)	Category	Diam.	Ref
676701	2016 NQ_{24}	—	July 7, 2016	Haleakala	Pan-STARRS 1	·	930 m	MPC · JPL
676702	2016 NE_{25}	—	July 8, 2016	Haleakala	Pan-STARRS 1	·	1.8 km	MPC · JPL
676703	2016 NP_{26}	—	July 8, 2016	Haleakala	Pan-STARRS 1	·	3.3 km	MPC · JPL
676704	2016 NO_{29}	—	July 9, 2016	Mount Lemmon	Mount Lemmon Survey	·	2.1 km	MPC · JPL
676705	2016 NU_{30}	—	October 22, 2008	Kitt Peak	Spacewatch	NEM	2.0 km	MPC · JPL
676706	2016 NX_{30}	—	September 24, 2003	Haleakala	NEAT	H	550 m	MPC · JPL
676707	2016 NR_{31}	—	July 26, 2011	Haleakala	Pan-STARRS 1	·	1.7 km	MPC · JPL
676708	2016 NY_{31}	—	July 11, 2016	Mount Lemmon	Mount Lemmon Survey	·	1.0 km	MPC · JPL
676709	2016 NA_{32}	—	March 18, 2015	Haleakala	Pan-STARRS 1	·	1.3 km	MPC · JPL
676710	2016 NB_{32}	—	January 14, 2002	Kitt Peak	Spacewatch	·	1.2 km	MPC · JPL
676711	2016 NK_{32}	—	September 30, 2008	Catalina	CSS	·	1.9 km	MPC · JPL
676712	2016 NX_{33}	—	July 12, 2016	Mount Lemmon	Mount Lemmon Survey	TIN	970 m	MPC · JPL
676713	2016 NJ_{34}	—	October 26, 2008	Kitt Peak	Spacewatch	·	1.4 km	MPC · JPL
676714	2016 NB_{37}	—	December 13, 2012	Mount Lemmon	Mount Lemmon Survey	EOS	1.8 km	MPC · JPL
676715	2016 NK_{37}	—	February 21, 2009	Mount Lemmon	Mount Lemmon Survey	EOS	1.5 km	MPC · JPL
676716	2016 NA_{38}	—	June 8, 2016	Haleakala	Pan-STARRS 1	·	1.7 km	MPC · JPL
676717	2016 NK_{40}	—	December 10, 2010	Majdanak	Sergeyev, A.	·	1.6 km	MPC · JPL
676718	2016 NB_{41}	—	November 28, 2013	Mount Lemmon	Mount Lemmon Survey	·	1.4 km	MPC · JPL
676719	2016 NB_{44}	—	January 27, 2015	Haleakala	Pan-STARRS 1	ADE	1.6 km	MPC · JPL
676720	2016 NT_{44}	—	October 18, 2004	Socorro	LINEAR	·	1.5 km	MPC · JPL
676721	2016 NN_{46}	—	July 12, 2016	Mount Lemmon	Mount Lemmon Survey	·	1.4 km	MPC · JPL
676722	2016 NB_{48}	—	October 22, 2009	Catalina	CSS	V	630 m	MPC · JPL
676723	2016 NW_{48}	—	July 13, 2016	Mount Lemmon	Mount Lemmon Survey	·	2.7 km	MPC · JPL
676724	2016 NP_{53}	—	February 27, 2014	Mount Lemmon	Mount Lemmon Survey	·	1.6 km	MPC · JPL
676725	2016 NR_{54}	—	February 17, 2015	Haleakala	Pan-STARRS 1	EUN	1.1 km	MPC · JPL
676726	2016 NS_{55}	—	September 12, 2007	Catalina	CSS	·	3.0 km	MPC · JPL
676727	2016 NG_{57}	—	July 13, 2016	Mount Lemmon	Mount Lemmon Survey	H	470 m	MPC · JPL
676728	2016 NZ_{59}	—	July 5, 2016	Haleakala	Pan-STARRS 1	T_{j} (2.98) · EUP	2.8 km	MPC · JPL
676729	2016 NM_{60}	—	November 8, 2007	Kitt Peak	Spacewatch	·	1.7 km	MPC · JPL
676730	2016 ND_{61}	—	July 8, 2002	Palomar	NEAT	·	1.6 km	MPC · JPL
676731	2016 NE_{61}	—	July 7, 2016	Haleakala	Pan-STARRS 1	T_{j} (2.96)	2.9 km	MPC · JPL
676732	2016 NM_{63}	—	July 12, 2016	Mount Lemmon	Mount Lemmon Survey	·	1.7 km	MPC · JPL
676733	2016 NN_{63}	—	October 25, 2011	XuYi	PMO NEO Survey Program	·	2.2 km	MPC · JPL
676734 Wójcicki	2016 NJ_{65}	Wójcicki	September 15, 2012	Tincana	Zolnowski, M., Kusiak, M.	·	1.2 km	MPC · JPL
676735	2016 NX_{65}	—	July 7, 2016	Haleakala	Pan-STARRS 1	·	1.4 km	MPC · JPL
676736	2016 NO_{68}	—	July 8, 2016	Haleakala	Pan-STARRS 1	·	1.5 km	MPC · JPL
676737	2016 NJ_{69}	—	July 4, 2016	Haleakala	Pan-STARRS 1	·	2.0 km	MPC · JPL
676738	2016 NT_{70}	—	September 15, 2006	Kitt Peak	Spacewatch	·	1.6 km	MPC · JPL
676739	2016 NO_{71}	—	October 10, 2012	Haleakala	Pan-STARRS 1	EUN	1.2 km	MPC · JPL
676740	2016 NL_{73}	—	September 13, 2007	Catalina	CSS	·	2.0 km	MPC · JPL
676741	2016 NN_{77}	—	December 29, 2014	Haleakala	Pan-STARRS 1	·	1.8 km	MPC · JPL
676742	2016 NR_{77}	—	September 8, 2011	Haleakala	Pan-STARRS 1	·	1.5 km	MPC · JPL
676743	2016 NA_{80}	—	November 20, 2003	Kitt Peak	Spacewatch	AGN	990 m	MPC · JPL
676744	2016 NB_{82}	—	May 31, 2011	Nogales	M. Schwartz, P. R. Holvorcem	·	1.5 km	MPC · JPL
676745	2016 NF_{82}	—	July 9, 2016	Mount Lemmon	Mount Lemmon Survey	·	2.8 km	MPC · JPL
676746	2016 NP_{82}	—	January 10, 2013	Haleakala	Pan-STARRS 1	·	2.1 km	MPC · JPL
676747	2016 NT_{82}	—	July 10, 2016	Mount Lemmon	Mount Lemmon Survey	·	1.8 km	MPC · JPL
676748	2016 NB_{85}	—	September 29, 2011	Mount Lemmon	Mount Lemmon Survey	·	2.2 km	MPC · JPL
676749	2016 NL_{85}	—	March 25, 2014	Mount Lemmon	Mount Lemmon Survey	·	1.7 km	MPC · JPL
676750	2016 NY_{85}	—	November 23, 2012	Kitt Peak	Spacewatch	·	1.6 km	MPC · JPL
676751	2016 NZ_{85}	—	July 11, 2016	Haleakala	Pan-STARRS 1	·	1.9 km	MPC · JPL
676752	2016 NE_{86}	—	February 28, 2014	Haleakala	Pan-STARRS 1	·	1.9 km	MPC · JPL
676753	2016 NS_{86}	—	August 15, 2001	Haleakala	NEAT	·	2.1 km	MPC · JPL
676754	2016 NW_{86}	—	May 21, 2011	Haleakala	Pan-STARRS 1	·	1.5 km	MPC · JPL
676755	2016 NA_{87}	—	October 24, 2003	Apache Point	SDSS	·	1.9 km	MPC · JPL
676756	2016 NA_{88}	—	July 30, 2005	Campo Imperatore	CINEOS	TIR	2.6 km	MPC · JPL
676757	2016 NF_{90}	—	October 12, 2007	Kitt Peak	Spacewatch	·	1.5 km	MPC · JPL
676758	2016 NO_{91}	—	September 28, 2006	Kitt Peak	Spacewatch	·	1.7 km	MPC · JPL
676759	2016 NZ_{91}	—	July 13, 2016	Haleakala	Pan-STARRS 1	·	1.4 km	MPC · JPL
676760	2016 NF_{92}	—	July 11, 2016	Haleakala	Pan-STARRS 1	·	2.1 km	MPC · JPL
676761	2016 NR_{92}	—	October 18, 2011	Siding Spring	G. Sostero, E. Guido	·	2.1 km	MPC · JPL
676762	2016 NX_{92}	—	July 7, 2016	Haleakala	Pan-STARRS 1	EOS	1.6 km	MPC · JPL
676763	2016 NJ_{93}	—	July 8, 2016	Haleakala	Pan-STARRS 1	·	1.6 km	MPC · JPL
676764	2016 NR_{95}	—	July 7, 2016	Haleakala	Pan-STARRS 1	·	1.5 km	MPC · JPL
676765	2016 NG_{100}	—	July 11, 2016	Haleakala	Pan-STARRS 1	·	1.7 km	MPC · JPL
676766	2016 NH_{105}	—	July 13, 2016	Haleakala	Pan-STARRS 1	·	1.5 km	MPC · JPL
676767	2016 NL_{108}	—	July 7, 2016	Haleakala	Pan-STARRS 1	·	1.3 km	MPC · JPL
676768	2016 NH_{110}	—	July 9, 2016	Haleakala	Pan-STARRS 1	BAR	590 m	MPC · JPL
676769	2016 NN_{110}	—	July 11, 2016	Haleakala	Pan-STARRS 1	·	2.9 km	MPC · JPL
676770	2016 NC_{112}	—	July 11, 2016	Haleakala	Pan-STARRS 1	·	1.9 km	MPC · JPL
676771	2016 ND_{113}	—	July 11, 2016	Haleakala	Pan-STARRS 1	KOR	1.4 km	MPC · JPL
676772	2016 NK_{113}	—	July 3, 2016	Mount Lemmon	Mount Lemmon Survey	·	1.5 km	MPC · JPL
676773	2016 NV_{119}	—	July 14, 2016	Haleakala	Pan-STARRS 1	·	1.6 km	MPC · JPL
676774	2016 NO_{122}	—	July 7, 2016	Haleakala	Pan-STARRS 1	·	1.4 km	MPC · JPL
676775	2016 NR_{123}	—	February 16, 2015	Haleakala	Pan-STARRS 1	·	1.7 km	MPC · JPL
676776	2016 NF_{135}	—	July 11, 2016	Haleakala	Pan-STARRS 1	·	690 m	MPC · JPL
676777	2016 NS_{137}	—	July 7, 2016	Haleakala	Pan-STARRS 1	·	2.1 km	MPC · JPL
676778	2016 NM_{140}	—	July 9, 2016	Haleakala	Pan-STARRS 1	·	1.4 km	MPC · JPL
676779	2016 NF_{145}	—	July 4, 2016	Haleakala	Pan-STARRS 1	615	1.3 km	MPC · JPL
676780	2016 NT_{145}	—	July 11, 2016	Haleakala	Pan-STARRS 1	·	1.7 km	MPC · JPL
676781	2016 NE_{147}	—	July 4, 2016	Haleakala	Pan-STARRS 1	·	1.4 km	MPC · JPL
676782	2016 NK_{152}	—	October 9, 2007	Mount Lemmon	Mount Lemmon Survey	·	1.8 km	MPC · JPL
676783	2016 NT_{152}	—	July 11, 2016	Haleakala	Pan-STARRS 1	·	1.6 km	MPC · JPL
676784	2016 NC_{153}	—	July 13, 2016	Haleakala	Pan-STARRS 1	·	1.3 km	MPC · JPL
676785	2016 OF_{2}	—	June 29, 2016	Haleakala	Pan-STARRS 1	EUP	3.1 km	MPC · JPL
676786	2016 ON_{2}	—	August 17, 2006	Palomar	NEAT	·	1.7 km	MPC · JPL
676787	2016 OX_{5}	—	July 9, 2005	Kitt Peak	Spacewatch	·	2.3 km	MPC · JPL
676788	2016 OB_{6}	—	July 30, 2016	Haleakala	Pan-STARRS 1	·	2.1 km	MPC · JPL
676789	2016 OE_{6}	—	July 30, 2016	Haleakala	Pan-STARRS 1	·	2.4 km	MPC · JPL
676790	2016 OU_{6}	—	November 7, 2007	Mount Lemmon	Mount Lemmon Survey	·	1.8 km	MPC · JPL
676791	2016 OZ_{7}	—	March 25, 2015	Haleakala	Pan-STARRS 1	·	1.8 km	MPC · JPL
676792	2016 OA_{8}	—	July 16, 2016	Mount Lemmon	Mount Lemmon Survey	TIR	2.2 km	MPC · JPL
676793	2016 OA_{9}	—	July 30, 2016	Haleakala	Pan-STARRS 1	·	2.8 km	MPC · JPL
676794	2016 OE_{9}	—	August 10, 2010	Kitt Peak	Spacewatch	URS	3.0 km	MPC · JPL
676795	2016 OY_{11}	—	July 30, 2016	Haleakala	Pan-STARRS 1	·	2.3 km	MPC · JPL
676796	2016 PU_{2}	—	October 20, 2012	Mount Lemmon	Mount Lemmon Survey	MRX	770 m	MPC · JPL
676797	2016 PT_{3}	—	January 3, 2013	Mount Lemmon	Mount Lemmon Survey	EMA	2.5 km	MPC · JPL
676798	2016 PJ_{6}	—	October 23, 2011	Haleakala	Pan-STARRS 1	·	2.5 km	MPC · JPL
676799	2016 PY_{9}	—	June 13, 2015	Haleakala	Pan-STARRS 1	·	1.4 km	MPC · JPL
676800	2016 PB_{12}	—	February 20, 2015	Haleakala	Pan-STARRS 1	·	2.0 km	MPC · JPL

== 676801–676900 ==
back to top

Designation			Discovery			Properties		Ref
Permanent	Provisional	Named after	Date	Site	Discoverer(s)	Category	Diam.	Ref
676801	2016 PF_{13}	—	March 12, 2002	Palomar	NEAT	JUN	910 m	MPC · JPL
676802	2016 PF_{14}	—	August 1, 2016	Haleakala	Pan-STARRS 1	·	2.1 km	MPC · JPL
676803	2016 PK_{15}	—	October 27, 2006	Catalina	CSS	·	2.2 km	MPC · JPL
676804	2016 PS_{15}	—	January 22, 2015	Haleakala	Pan-STARRS 1	AGN	960 m	MPC · JPL
676805	2016 PE_{16}	—	September 21, 2011	Mayhill-ISON	L. Elenin	·	1.9 km	MPC · JPL
676806	2016 PT_{18}	—	November 1, 2008	Mount Lemmon	Mount Lemmon Survey	·	1.5 km	MPC · JPL
676807	2016 PG_{24}	—	October 22, 2012	Kitt Peak	Spacewatch	·	1.4 km	MPC · JPL
676808	2016 PV_{24}	—	January 28, 2015	Haleakala	Pan-STARRS 1	EUN	1.1 km	MPC · JPL
676809	2016 PH_{28}	—	November 8, 2013	Nogales	M. Schwartz, P. R. Holvorcem	PHO	940 m	MPC · JPL
676810	2016 PO_{30}	—	October 29, 2011	Haleakala	Pan-STARRS 1	·	2.7 km	MPC · JPL
676811	2016 PX_{31}	—	August 6, 2016	Haleakala	Pan-STARRS 1	·	2.1 km	MPC · JPL
676812	2016 PH_{35}	—	June 2, 2016	Haleakala	Pan-STARRS 1	·	1.4 km	MPC · JPL
676813	2016 PY_{35}	—	February 23, 2015	Haleakala	Pan-STARRS 1	·	1.7 km	MPC · JPL
676814	2016 PP_{43}	—	March 21, 2015	Haleakala	Pan-STARRS 1	·	2.4 km	MPC · JPL
676815	2016 PS_{43}	—	September 12, 2013	Mount Lemmon	Mount Lemmon Survey	V	530 m	MPC · JPL
676816	2016 PS_{46}	—	October 16, 2012	Mount Lemmon	Mount Lemmon Survey	·	1.5 km	MPC · JPL
676817	2016 PU_{47}	—	January 23, 2015	Haleakala	Pan-STARRS 1	·	1.9 km	MPC · JPL
676818	2016 PG_{50}	—	June 17, 2007	Kitt Peak	Spacewatch	·	1.4 km	MPC · JPL
676819	2016 PR_{50}	—	March 23, 2014	Mount Lemmon	Mount Lemmon Survey	·	1.8 km	MPC · JPL
676820	2016 PA_{51}	—	May 21, 2006	Kitt Peak	Spacewatch	·	1.7 km	MPC · JPL
676821	2016 PZ_{51}	—	October 23, 2012	Mount Lemmon	Mount Lemmon Survey	·	1.8 km	MPC · JPL
676822	2016 PJ_{53}	—	January 9, 2013	Kitt Peak	Spacewatch	LIX	3.1 km	MPC · JPL
676823	2016 PM_{58}	—	December 22, 2012	Haleakala	Pan-STARRS 1	EOS	1.5 km	MPC · JPL
676824	2016 PN_{61}	—	October 19, 2007	Mount Lemmon	Mount Lemmon Survey	KOR	1.0 km	MPC · JPL
676825	2016 PW_{64}	—	August 9, 2016	Haleakala	Pan-STARRS 1	EOS	1.3 km	MPC · JPL
676826	2016 PW_{66}	—	January 3, 2011	Mount Lemmon	Mount Lemmon Survey	·	540 m	MPC · JPL
676827	2016 PP_{67}	—	May 12, 2015	Mount Lemmon	Mount Lemmon Survey	EOS	1.8 km	MPC · JPL
676828	2016 PV_{67}	—	October 12, 2007	Anderson Mesa	LONEOS	·	1.5 km	MPC · JPL
676829	2016 PH_{68}	—	August 9, 2016	Elena Remote	Oreshko, A.	·	1.1 km	MPC · JPL
676830	2016 PR_{70}	—	September 24, 2011	Haleakala	Pan-STARRS 1	·	2.3 km	MPC · JPL
676831	2016 PV_{71}	—	March 12, 2007	Catalina	CSS	·	1.5 km	MPC · JPL
676832	2016 PD_{73}	—	August 10, 2016	Haleakala	Pan-STARRS 1	·	730 m	MPC · JPL
676833	2016 PV_{73}	—	January 3, 2011	Mount Lemmon	Mount Lemmon Survey	·	550 m	MPC · JPL
676834	2016 PL_{74}	—	August 10, 2016	Haleakala	Pan-STARRS 1	TIR	2.1 km	MPC · JPL
676835	2016 PN_{75}	—	October 23, 2012	Kitt Peak	Spacewatch	·	1.1 km	MPC · JPL
676836	2016 PS_{75}	—	October 23, 2011	Haleakala	Pan-STARRS 1	·	2.1 km	MPC · JPL
676837	2016 PP_{76}	—	June 5, 2016	Haleakala	Pan-STARRS 1	·	1.9 km	MPC · JPL
676838	2016 PS_{76}	—	June 5, 2016	Haleakala	Pan-STARRS 1	·	2.2 km	MPC · JPL
676839	2016 PJ_{77}	—	August 28, 2003	Palomar	NEAT	·	1.7 km	MPC · JPL
676840	2016 PN_{79}	—	September 18, 2006	Kitt Peak	Spacewatch	H	430 m	MPC · JPL
676841	2016 PZ_{79}	—	August 2, 2016	Haleakala	Pan-STARRS 1	·	950 m	MPC · JPL
676842	2016 PW_{81}	—	November 25, 2011	Haleakala	Pan-STARRS 1	TIR	2.6 km	MPC · JPL
676843	2016 PA_{82}	—	August 2, 2016	Haleakala	Pan-STARRS 1	·	2.2 km	MPC · JPL
676844	2016 PP_{82}	—	August 2, 2016	Haleakala	Pan-STARRS 1	·	1.7 km	MPC · JPL
676845	2016 PX_{83}	—	August 2, 2016	Haleakala	Pan-STARRS 1	·	1.9 km	MPC · JPL
676846	2016 PF_{84}	—	August 2, 2016	Haleakala	Pan-STARRS 1	·	2.1 km	MPC · JPL
676847	2016 PP_{84}	—	January 4, 2013	Cerro Tololo-DECam	DECam	·	1.7 km	MPC · JPL
676848	2016 PV_{84}	—	August 21, 2006	Kitt Peak	Spacewatch	·	1.3 km	MPC · JPL
676849	2016 PR_{85}	—	November 30, 2000	Kitt Peak	Spacewatch	·	2.4 km	MPC · JPL
676850	2016 PL_{87}	—	August 10, 2016	Haleakala	Pan-STARRS 1	·	3.0 km	MPC · JPL
676851	2016 PQ_{87}	—	August 10, 2016	Haleakala	Pan-STARRS 1	·	2.7 km	MPC · JPL
676852	2016 PD_{89}	—	April 11, 2005	Mount Lemmon	Mount Lemmon Survey	·	1.7 km	MPC · JPL
676853	2016 PJ_{89}	—	August 31, 2003	Haleakala	NEAT	·	1.8 km	MPC · JPL
676854	2016 PB_{91}	—	May 22, 2011	Mount Lemmon	Mount Lemmon Survey	·	1.3 km	MPC · JPL
676855	2016 PH_{91}	—	March 20, 2015	Haleakala	Pan-STARRS 1	DOR	1.8 km	MPC · JPL
676856	2016 PC_{93}	—	September 14, 2007	Mount Lemmon	Mount Lemmon Survey	·	1.4 km	MPC · JPL
676857	2016 PW_{93}	—	October 22, 2012	Haleakala	Pan-STARRS 1	·	1.6 km	MPC · JPL
676858	2016 PC_{94}	—	October 15, 2007	Mount Lemmon	Mount Lemmon Survey	·	1.7 km	MPC · JPL
676859	2016 PZ_{95}	—	February 11, 2008	Mount Lemmon	Mount Lemmon Survey	·	1.8 km	MPC · JPL
676860	2016 PY_{98}	—	April 12, 2011	Mount Lemmon	Mount Lemmon Survey	V	800 m	MPC · JPL
676861	2016 PE_{99}	—	February 27, 2014	Haleakala	Pan-STARRS 1	·	2.1 km	MPC · JPL
676862	2016 PE_{100}	—	August 2, 2016	Haleakala	Pan-STARRS 1	·	1.1 km	MPC · JPL
676863	2016 PF_{100}	—	February 8, 2013	Haleakala	Pan-STARRS 1	·	2.6 km	MPC · JPL
676864	2016 PC_{105}	—	March 28, 2015	Haleakala	Pan-STARRS 1	·	1.5 km	MPC · JPL
676865	2016 PP_{105}	—	December 3, 2012	Mount Lemmon	Mount Lemmon Survey	·	2.0 km	MPC · JPL
676866	2016 PW_{108}	—	January 22, 2013	Mount Lemmon	Mount Lemmon Survey	·	2.0 km	MPC · JPL
676867	2016 PS_{109}	—	February 26, 2014	Haleakala	Pan-STARRS 1	NAE	2.3 km	MPC · JPL
676868	2016 PV_{109}	—	October 3, 2011	Piszkéstető	K. Sárneczky	·	2.3 km	MPC · JPL
676869	2016 PG_{111}	—	August 2, 2016	Haleakala	Pan-STARRS 1	·	1.2 km	MPC · JPL
676870	2016 PJ_{112}	—	August 2, 2016	Haleakala	Pan-STARRS 1	KOR	1.2 km	MPC · JPL
676871	2016 PV_{114}	—	September 11, 2005	Kitt Peak	Spacewatch	·	2.0 km	MPC · JPL
676872	2016 PC_{115}	—	August 30, 2011	Haleakala	Pan-STARRS 1	EOS	1.4 km	MPC · JPL
676873	2016 PY_{115}	—	October 20, 2012	Kitt Peak	Spacewatch	KOR	1.1 km	MPC · JPL
676874	2016 PN_{116}	—	October 11, 2012	Haleakala	Pan-STARRS 1	HOF	1.9 km	MPC · JPL
676875	2016 PT_{116}	—	August 27, 2011	Haleakala	Pan-STARRS 1	·	1.4 km	MPC · JPL
676876	2016 PN_{117}	—	August 3, 2016	Haleakala	Pan-STARRS 1	·	2.0 km	MPC · JPL
676877	2016 PB_{118}	—	March 4, 2014	Oukaïmeden	M. Ory	·	2.3 km	MPC · JPL
676878	2016 PM_{118}	—	March 7, 2014	Oukaïmeden	C. Rinner	·	2.1 km	MPC · JPL
676879	2016 PF_{119}	—	August 7, 2016	Haleakala	Pan-STARRS 1	·	1.9 km	MPC · JPL
676880	2016 PX_{122}	—	October 18, 2003	Kitt Peak	Spacewatch	EUN	1.1 km	MPC · JPL
676881	2016 PC_{123}	—	August 10, 2016	Haleakala	Pan-STARRS 1	EOS	1.5 km	MPC · JPL
676882	2016 PL_{123}	—	September 30, 2011	Kitt Peak	Spacewatch	EOS	1.2 km	MPC · JPL
676883	2016 PV_{123}	—	December 3, 2005	Mauna Kea	A. Boattini	·	1.3 km	MPC · JPL
676884	2016 PD_{124}	—	August 25, 2000	Cerro Tololo	Deep Ecliptic Survey	·	1.6 km	MPC · JPL
676885	2016 PR_{124}	—	October 26, 2011	Haleakala	Pan-STARRS 1	EOS	1.2 km	MPC · JPL
676886	2016 PJ_{125}	—	February 6, 2014	Mount Lemmon	Mount Lemmon Survey	·	1.9 km	MPC · JPL
676887	2016 PX_{125}	—	August 13, 2016	Haleakala	Pan-STARRS 1	·	1.8 km	MPC · JPL
676888	2016 PY_{125}	—	December 21, 2006	Kitt Peak	Spacewatch	·	2.3 km	MPC · JPL
676889	2016 PR_{126}	—	August 14, 2016	Haleakala	Pan-STARRS 1	·	1.6 km	MPC · JPL
676890	2016 PE_{127}	—	August 14, 2016	Haleakala	Pan-STARRS 1	MAR	800 m	MPC · JPL
676891	2016 PJ_{128}	—	July 16, 2016	Mount Lemmon	Mount Lemmon Survey	·	1.7 km	MPC · JPL
676892	2016 PO_{128}	—	August 1, 2016	Haleakala	Pan-STARRS 1	·	2.3 km	MPC · JPL
676893	2016 PP_{128}	—	August 9, 2016	Haleakala	Pan-STARRS 1	·	2.7 km	MPC · JPL
676894	2016 PX_{128}	—	October 11, 1999	Kitt Peak	Spacewatch	T_{j} (2.99) · EUP	2.5 km	MPC · JPL
676895	2016 PB_{129}	—	August 1, 2016	Haleakala	Pan-STARRS 1	EOS	1.3 km	MPC · JPL
676896	2016 PF_{129}	—	August 2, 2016	Haleakala	Pan-STARRS 1	THB	2.4 km	MPC · JPL
676897	2016 PK_{130}	—	August 1, 2016	Haleakala	Pan-STARRS 1	·	1.5 km	MPC · JPL
676898	2016 PV_{130}	—	August 3, 2016	Haleakala	Pan-STARRS 1	·	1.5 km	MPC · JPL
676899	2016 PQ_{131}	—	August 7, 2016	Haleakala	Pan-STARRS 1	·	1.1 km	MPC · JPL
676900	2016 PX_{131}	—	August 2, 2016	Haleakala	Pan-STARRS 1	·	2.0 km	MPC · JPL

== 676901–677000 ==
back to top

Designation			Discovery			Properties		Ref
Permanent	Provisional	Named after	Date	Site	Discoverer(s)	Category	Diam.	Ref
676901	2016 PB_{132}	—	August 10, 2016	Haleakala	Pan-STARRS 1	·	2.6 km	MPC · JPL
676902	2016 PW_{136}	—	August 10, 2016	Haleakala	Pan-STARRS 1	EUP	2.4 km	MPC · JPL
676903	2016 PT_{138}	—	May 28, 2011	Mount Lemmon	Mount Lemmon Survey	·	1.4 km	MPC · JPL
676904	2016 PQ_{139}	—	August 12, 2016	Haleakala	Pan-STARRS 1	·	1.1 km	MPC · JPL
676905	2016 PH_{146}	—	February 15, 2010	Catalina	CSS	·	1.6 km	MPC · JPL
676906	2016 PH_{147}	—	August 6, 2016	Haleakala	Pan-STARRS 1	·	2.5 km	MPC · JPL
676907	2016 PB_{148}	—	August 2, 2016	Haleakala	Pan-STARRS 1	·	590 m	MPC · JPL
676908	2016 PO_{152}	—	August 3, 2016	Haleakala	Pan-STARRS 1	·	1.6 km	MPC · JPL
676909	2016 PZ_{153}	—	August 1, 2016	Haleakala	Pan-STARRS 1	·	1.4 km	MPC · JPL
676910	2016 PV_{154}	—	August 6, 2016	Haleakala	Pan-STARRS 1	EOS	1.3 km	MPC · JPL
676911	2016 PM_{156}	—	August 8, 2016	Haleakala	Pan-STARRS 1	·	1.8 km	MPC · JPL
676912	2016 PW_{156}	—	August 1, 2016	Haleakala	Pan-STARRS 1	·	1.6 km	MPC · JPL
676913	2016 PD_{157}	—	August 3, 2016	Haleakala	Pan-STARRS 1	MRX	990 m	MPC · JPL
676914	2016 PM_{157}	—	August 7, 2016	Haleakala	Pan-STARRS 1	·	1.9 km	MPC · JPL
676915	2016 PN_{157}	—	August 8, 2016	Haleakala	Pan-STARRS 1	·	1.4 km	MPC · JPL
676916	2016 PA_{158}	—	August 12, 2016	Haleakala	Pan-STARRS 1	EUN	860 m	MPC · JPL
676917	2016 PN_{158}	—	August 2, 2016	Haleakala	Pan-STARRS 1	·	1.6 km	MPC · JPL
676918	2016 PB_{159}	—	August 6, 2016	Haleakala	Pan-STARRS 1	·	1.9 km	MPC · JPL
676919	2016 PA_{161}	—	August 10, 2016	Haleakala	Pan-STARRS 1	·	2.4 km	MPC · JPL
676920	2016 PV_{164}	—	August 2, 2016	Haleakala	Pan-STARRS 1	·	1.2 km	MPC · JPL
676921	2016 PO_{166}	—	September 15, 2007	Lulin	LUSS	·	1.5 km	MPC · JPL
676922	2016 PM_{167}	—	August 2, 2016	Haleakala	Pan-STARRS 1	·	1.5 km	MPC · JPL
676923	2016 PN_{167}	—	August 10, 2016	Haleakala	Pan-STARRS 1	·	2.0 km	MPC · JPL
676924	2016 PD_{168}	—	August 6, 2016	Haleakala	Pan-STARRS 1	NAE	1.8 km	MPC · JPL
676925	2016 PS_{184}	—	August 1, 2016	Haleakala	Pan-STARRS 1	·	2.3 km	MPC · JPL
676926	2016 PY_{184}	—	August 8, 2016	Haleakala	Pan-STARRS 1	·	1.7 km	MPC · JPL
676927	2016 PA_{193}	—	August 7, 2016	Haleakala	Pan-STARRS 1	·	2.3 km	MPC · JPL
676928	2016 PC_{193}	—	August 8, 2016	Haleakala	Pan-STARRS 1	KOR	1.0 km	MPC · JPL
676929	2016 PL_{194}	—	August 14, 2016	Haleakala	Pan-STARRS 1	·	2.5 km	MPC · JPL
676930	2016 PA_{197}	—	August 3, 2016	Haleakala	Pan-STARRS 1	·	490 m	MPC · JPL
676931	2016 PV_{202}	—	August 3, 2016	Haleakala	Pan-STARRS 1	·	1.6 km	MPC · JPL
676932	2016 PL_{205}	—	August 9, 2016	Haleakala	Pan-STARRS 1	EOS	1.3 km	MPC · JPL
676933	2016 PS_{207}	—	August 6, 2016	Haleakala	Pan-STARRS 1	·	1.5 km	MPC · JPL
676934	2016 PS_{210}	—	August 2, 2016	Haleakala	Pan-STARRS 1	·	1.3 km	MPC · JPL
676935	2016 PR_{212}	—	August 13, 2016	Haleakala	Pan-STARRS 1	·	2.4 km	MPC · JPL
676936	2016 PG_{213}	—	August 8, 2016	Haleakala	Pan-STARRS 1	·	1.5 km	MPC · JPL
676937	2016 PH_{213}	—	August 1, 2016	Haleakala	Pan-STARRS 1	GEF	890 m	MPC · JPL
676938	2016 PP_{216}	—	August 2, 2016	Haleakala	Pan-STARRS 1	·	1.8 km	MPC · JPL
676939	2016 PV_{217}	—	August 2, 2016	Haleakala	Pan-STARRS 1	·	1.8 km	MPC · JPL
676940	2016 PM_{218}	—	August 10, 2016	Haleakala	Pan-STARRS 1	·	2.1 km	MPC · JPL
676941	2016 PJ_{220}	—	August 11, 2016	Haleakala	Pan-STARRS 1	·	1.4 km	MPC · JPL
676942	2016 PS_{224}	—	August 1, 2016	Haleakala	Pan-STARRS 1	·	1.7 km	MPC · JPL
676943	2016 PX_{225}	—	August 3, 2016	Haleakala	Pan-STARRS 1	·	1.0 km	MPC · JPL
676944	2016 PA_{226}	—	August 7, 2016	Haleakala	Pan-STARRS 1	·	1.5 km	MPC · JPL
676945	2016 PM_{228}	—	August 1, 2016	Haleakala	Pan-STARRS 1	·	1.7 km	MPC · JPL
676946	2016 PC_{237}	—	August 9, 2016	Haleakala	Pan-STARRS 1	EOS	1.3 km	MPC · JPL
676947	2016 PD_{238}	—	August 1, 2016	Haleakala	Pan-STARRS 1	·	2.4 km	MPC · JPL
676948	2016 PN_{239}	—	February 28, 2014	Haleakala	Pan-STARRS 1	·	1.5 km	MPC · JPL
676949	2016 PG_{243}	—	August 2, 2016	Haleakala	Pan-STARRS 1	·	2.2 km	MPC · JPL
676950	2016 PV_{248}	—	August 11, 2016	Haleakala	Pan-STARRS 1	·	2.7 km	MPC · JPL
676951	2016 QJ_{1}	—	August 17, 2016	Haleakala	Pan-STARRS 1	·	1.1 km	MPC · JPL
676952	2016 QL_{3}	—	December 15, 2006	Mount Lemmon	Mount Lemmon Survey	·	900 m	MPC · JPL
676953	2016 QU_{5}	—	September 10, 2005	Anderson Mesa	LONEOS	·	2.5 km	MPC · JPL
676954	2016 QO_{6}	—	September 4, 2002	Anderson Mesa	LONEOS	·	2.0 km	MPC · JPL
676955	2016 QP_{8}	—	March 28, 2015	Haleakala	Pan-STARRS 1	EOS	1.4 km	MPC · JPL
676956	2016 QJ_{9}	—	November 30, 2004	Palomar	NEAT	·	1.4 km	MPC · JPL
676957	2016 QZ_{14}	—	August 29, 2011	Siding Spring	SSS	H	420 m	MPC · JPL
676958	2016 QC_{15}	—	August 26, 2016	Haleakala	Pan-STARRS 1	·	1.4 km	MPC · JPL
676959	2016 QH_{16}	—	October 31, 2008	Catalina	CSS	MAR	1.3 km	MPC · JPL
676960	2016 QU_{19}	—	October 10, 2008	Mount Lemmon	Mount Lemmon Survey	RAF	1.0 km	MPC · JPL
676961	2016 QH_{20}	—	April 29, 2012	Mount Lemmon	Mount Lemmon Survey	·	710 m	MPC · JPL
676962	2016 QL_{20}	—	October 27, 2011	Mount Lemmon	Mount Lemmon Survey	·	2.1 km	MPC · JPL
676963	2016 QT_{20}	—	August 26, 2016	Haleakala	Pan-STARRS 1	·	930 m	MPC · JPL
676964	2016 QB_{21}	—	March 5, 2006	Kitt Peak	Spacewatch	·	1.9 km	MPC · JPL
676965	2016 QH_{21}	—	September 28, 2011	Mount Lemmon	Mount Lemmon Survey	·	2.2 km	MPC · JPL
676966	2016 QK_{21}	—	July 11, 2016	Haleakala	Pan-STARRS 1	·	650 m	MPC · JPL
676967	2016 QG_{22}	—	April 20, 2015	Haleakala	Pan-STARRS 1	·	2.7 km	MPC · JPL
676968	2016 QG_{24}	—	August 24, 2012	Kitt Peak	Spacewatch	·	1.2 km	MPC · JPL
676969	2016 QT_{25}	—	October 31, 2007	Kitt Peak	Spacewatch	·	1.4 km	MPC · JPL
676970	2016 QB_{26}	—	November 8, 2013	Mount Lemmon	Mount Lemmon Survey	·	1.0 km	MPC · JPL
676971	2016 QD_{26}	—	October 22, 2003	Apache Point	SDSS Collaboration	·	1.4 km	MPC · JPL
676972	2016 QS_{28}	—	November 1, 2006	Kitt Peak	Spacewatch	·	470 m	MPC · JPL
676973	2016 QS_{33}	—	June 1, 2012	Mount Lemmon	Mount Lemmon Survey	·	1.3 km	MPC · JPL
676974	2016 QU_{34}	—	August 24, 2005	Palomar	NEAT	·	2.3 km	MPC · JPL
676975	2016 QL_{35}	—	August 3, 2016	Haleakala	Pan-STARRS 1	·	1.3 km	MPC · JPL
676976	2016 QB_{36}	—	July 7, 2016	Haleakala	Pan-STARRS 1	PHO	830 m	MPC · JPL
676977	2016 QZ_{36}	—	February 15, 2010	Kitt Peak	Spacewatch	WIT	1.2 km	MPC · JPL
676978	2016 QA_{38}	—	October 21, 2012	Haleakala	Pan-STARRS 1	AGN	960 m	MPC · JPL
676979	2016 QL_{48}	—	September 24, 2006	Kitt Peak	Spacewatch	·	1.3 km	MPC · JPL
676980	2016 QP_{55}	—	November 23, 2006	Mount Lemmon	Mount Lemmon Survey	·	2.4 km	MPC · JPL
676981	2016 QL_{60}	—	September 19, 2011	Haleakala	Pan-STARRS 1	·	2.0 km	MPC · JPL
676982	2016 QJ_{62}	—	August 3, 2016	Haleakala	Pan-STARRS 1	·	1.4 km	MPC · JPL
676983	2016 QS_{62}	—	August 28, 2016	Mount Lemmon	Mount Lemmon Survey	HNS	920 m	MPC · JPL
676984	2016 QL_{66}	—	September 21, 2012	Kitt Peak	Spacewatch	·	1.6 km	MPC · JPL
676985	2016 QV_{66}	—	January 3, 2009	Mount Lemmon	Mount Lemmon Survey	·	1.7 km	MPC · JPL
676986	2016 QU_{70}	—	October 2, 2006	Mount Lemmon	Mount Lemmon Survey	·	2.0 km	MPC · JPL
676987	2016 QN_{71}	—	July 7, 2016	Mount Lemmon	Mount Lemmon Survey	·	1.0 km	MPC · JPL
676988	2016 QT_{73}	—	July 31, 2000	Cerro Tololo	Deep Ecliptic Survey	·	1.8 km	MPC · JPL
676989	2016 QM_{74}	—	August 12, 2016	Haleakala	Pan-STARRS 1	·	1.7 km	MPC · JPL
676990	2016 QZ_{74}	—	August 29, 2016	Mount Lemmon	Mount Lemmon Survey	·	1.3 km	MPC · JPL
676991	2016 QG_{75}	—	July 24, 2008	Marly	P. Kocher	·	1.3 km	MPC · JPL
676992	2016 QN_{75}	—	July 7, 2016	Mount Lemmon	Mount Lemmon Survey	·	2.2 km	MPC · JPL
676993	2016 QK_{78}	—	August 31, 2011	Haleakala	Pan-STARRS 1	·	2.5 km	MPC · JPL
676994	2016 QS_{78}	—	September 23, 2000	Kitt Peak	Spacewatch	·	1.9 km	MPC · JPL
676995	2016 QW_{81}	—	October 14, 2012	Kitt Peak	Spacewatch	·	1.4 km	MPC · JPL
676996	2016 QX_{81}	—	August 30, 2016	Mount Lemmon	Mount Lemmon Survey	·	2.5 km	MPC · JPL
676997	2016 QP_{82}	—	June 4, 2003	Kitt Peak	Spacewatch	·	1.1 km	MPC · JPL
676998	2016 QG_{83}	—	August 27, 2005	Palomar	NEAT	·	1.3 km	MPC · JPL
676999	2016 QV_{85}	—	August 18, 2006	Kitt Peak	Spacewatch	H	390 m	MPC · JPL
677000	2016 QG_{86}	—	September 4, 2010	Mount Lemmon	Mount Lemmon Survey	·	2.3 km	MPC · JPL

back to top

== Meaning of names ==
As minor planet discoveries are confirmed, they are given a permanent number by the IAU's Minor Planet Center (MPC), and the discoverers can then submit names for them, following the IAU's naming conventions. The list below concerns those minor planets in the specified number-range that have received names, and explains the meanings of those names.

Official naming citations of newly named small Solar System bodies are approved and published in a bulletin by IAU's Working Group for Small Bodies Nomenclature (WGSBN). Before May 2021, citations were published in MPC's Minor Planet Circulars for many decades. Recent citations can also be found on the JPL Small-Body Database (SBDB). Until his death in 2016, German astronomer Lutz D. Schmadel compiled these citations into the Dictionary of Minor Planet Names (DMP) and regularly updated the collection.

Based on Paul Herget's The Names of the Minor Planets, Schmadel also researched the unclear origin of numerous asteroids, most of which had been named prior to World War II. This article incorporates text from this source, which is in the public domain: SBDB New namings may only be added to this list below after official publication as the preannouncement of names is condemned. The WGSBN publishes a comprehensive guideline for the naming rules of non-cometary small Solar System bodies.

Named minor planet	Provisional	This minor planet was named for...	Ref · Catalog
676734 Wójcicki	2016 NJ_{65}	Karol Wójcicki (b. 1988), a well-known Polish popularizer of astronomy.	IAU · 676734
