= List of minor planets: 816001–817000 =

The following is a partial list of minor planets, running from minor-planet number 816001 through 817000, inclusive. The primary data for this and other partial lists is based on JPL's "Small-Body Orbital Elements" and data available from the Minor Planet Center. Critical list information is also provided by the MPC, unless otherwise specified from Lowell Observatory. A detailed description of the table's columns and additional sources are given on the main page including a complete list of every page in this series, and a statistical break-up on the dynamical classification of minor planets.

Also see the summary list of all named bodies in numerical and alphabetical order, and the corresponding naming citations for the number range of this particular list. New namings may only be added to this list after official publication, as the preannouncement of names is condemned by the Working Group for Small Bodies Nomenclature of the International Astronomical Union.

Near-Earth obj.	MBA (inner)	MBA (outer)	Centaur
Mars-crosser	MBA (middle)	Jupiter trojan	Trans-Neptunian obj.
Unclassified

== 816001–816100 ==
Designation			Discovery			Properties		Ref
Permanent	Provisional	Named after	Date	Site	Discoverer(s)	Category	Diam.	Ref
816001	2010 XG_{92}	—	December 14, 2010	Mount Lemmon	Mount Lemmon Survey	·	480 m	MPC · JPL
816002	2010 XP_{96}	—	December 9, 2010	Mount Lemmon	Mount Lemmon Survey	PHO	830 m	MPC · JPL
816003	2010 XG_{97}	—	December 1, 2010	Mount Lemmon	Mount Lemmon Survey	·	450 m	MPC · JPL
816004	2010 XU_{97}	—	December 13, 2010	Mauna Kea	M. Micheli, L. Wells	·	1.9 km	MPC · JPL
816005	2010 XW_{97}	—	October 9, 2013	Mount Lemmon	Mount Lemmon Survey	·	510 m	MPC · JPL
816006	2010 XN_{98}	—	March 28, 2015	Haleakala	Pan-STARRS 1	·	540 m	MPC · JPL
816007	2010 XX_{99}	—	December 2, 2010	Kitt Peak	Spacewatch	·	530 m	MPC · JPL
816008	2010 XL_{103}	—	December 2, 2010	Mount Lemmon	Mount Lemmon Survey	GAL	1.0 km	MPC · JPL
816009	2010 XS_{103}	—	December 8, 2010	Mount Lemmon	Mount Lemmon Survey	H	390 m	MPC · JPL
816010	2010 XQ_{105}	—	December 8, 2010	Kitt Peak	Spacewatch	·	990 m	MPC · JPL
816011	2010 XW_{109}	—	December 2, 2010	Mount Lemmon	Mount Lemmon Survey	TIR	2.3 km	MPC · JPL
816012	2010 XF_{110}	—	December 3, 2010	Mount Lemmon	Mount Lemmon Survey	·	2.4 km	MPC · JPL
816013	2010 XB_{111}	—	December 10, 2010	Mount Lemmon	Mount Lemmon Survey	H	360 m	MPC · JPL
816014	2010 XO_{111}	—	December 6, 2010	Mount Lemmon	Mount Lemmon Survey	HYG	2.0 km	MPC · JPL
816015	2010 XP_{111}	—	December 14, 2010	Mount Lemmon	Mount Lemmon Survey	·	2.2 km	MPC · JPL
816016	2010 XD_{112}	—	December 2, 2010	Mount Lemmon	Mount Lemmon Survey	·	530 m	MPC · JPL
816017	2010 XN_{112}	—	December 8, 2010	Mount Lemmon	Mount Lemmon Survey	T_{j} (2.95)	3.4 km	MPC · JPL
816018	2010 XR_{112}	—	December 8, 2010	Kitt Peak	Spacewatch	H	490 m	MPC · JPL
816019	2010 XC_{113}	—	December 14, 2010	Mount Lemmon	Mount Lemmon Survey	·	520 m	MPC · JPL
816020	2010 XL_{113}	—	December 4, 2010	Mount Lemmon	Mount Lemmon Survey	·	2.9 km	MPC · JPL
816021	2010 XU_{113}	—	December 13, 2010	Mount Lemmon	Mount Lemmon Survey	·	490 m	MPC · JPL
816022	2010 XQ_{116}	—	December 1, 2010	Mount Lemmon	Mount Lemmon Survey	·	710 m	MPC · JPL
816023	2010 XA_{119}	—	December 4, 2010	Mount Lemmon	Mount Lemmon Survey	·	430 m	MPC · JPL
816024	2010 XV_{123}	—	December 2, 2010	Mount Lemmon	Mount Lemmon Survey	·	430 m	MPC · JPL
816025	2010 YA_{2}	—	November 24, 2003	Palomar	NEAT	PHO	870 m	MPC · JPL
816026	2010 YN_{6}	—	September 12, 2015	Haleakala	Pan-STARRS 1	H	400 m	MPC · JPL
816027	2011 AU_{1}	—	December 8, 2010	Kitt Peak	Spacewatch	·	2.5 km	MPC · JPL
816028	2011 AU_{8}	—	January 2, 2011	Mount Lemmon	Mount Lemmon Survey	·	1.2 km	MPC · JPL
816029	2011 AT_{11}	—	December 18, 1999	Kitt Peak	Spacewatch	H	420 m	MPC · JPL
816030	2011 AX_{21}	—	January 9, 2011	Mount Lemmon	Mount Lemmon Survey	·	2.1 km	MPC · JPL
816031	2011 AO_{33}	—	January 10, 2011	Mount Lemmon	Mount Lemmon Survey	·	550 m	MPC · JPL
816032	2011 AM_{36}	—	January 12, 2011	Mount Lemmon	Mount Lemmon Survey	·	900 m	MPC · JPL
816033	2011 AY_{36}	—	December 9, 2010	Mount Lemmon	Mount Lemmon Survey	H	430 m	MPC · JPL
816034	2011 AJ_{43}	—	October 31, 2005	Mauna Kea	A. Boattini	THM	1.8 km	MPC · JPL
816035	2011 AW_{44}	—	February 27, 2006	Mount Lemmon	Mount Lemmon Survey	·	1.3 km	MPC · JPL
816036	2011 AT_{47}	—	December 14, 2010	Mount Lemmon	Mount Lemmon Survey	·	3.3 km	MPC · JPL
816037	2011 AG_{56}	—	January 10, 2011	Kitt Peak	Spacewatch	·	620 m	MPC · JPL
816038	2011 AN_{57}	—	December 13, 2010	Mount Lemmon	Mount Lemmon Survey	·	1.9 km	MPC · JPL
816039	2011 AR_{61}	—	December 13, 2010	Mount Lemmon	Mount Lemmon Survey	·	2.3 km	MPC · JPL
816040	2011 AB_{62}	—	January 13, 2011	Mount Lemmon	Mount Lemmon Survey	·	850 m	MPC · JPL
816041	2011 AZ_{64}	—	December 14, 2010	Mount Lemmon	Mount Lemmon Survey	·	510 m	MPC · JPL
816042	2011 AH_{70}	—	January 13, 2011	Kitt Peak	Spacewatch	·	490 m	MPC · JPL
816043	2011 AM_{73}	—	January 3, 2011	Mount Lemmon	Mount Lemmon Survey	H	450 m	MPC · JPL
816044	2011 AV_{85}	—	October 1, 2013	Mount Lemmon	Mount Lemmon Survey	·	540 m	MPC · JPL
816045	2011 AB_{86}	—	January 2, 2011	Mount Lemmon	Mount Lemmon Survey	NYS	700 m	MPC · JPL
816046	2011 AS_{86}	—	January 14, 2011	Kitt Peak	Spacewatch	·	520 m	MPC · JPL
816047	2011 AV_{86}	—	July 12, 2016	Haleakala	Pan-STARRS 1	PHO	690 m	MPC · JPL
816048	2011 AT_{87}	—	January 8, 2011	Mount Lemmon	Mount Lemmon Survey	H	460 m	MPC · JPL
816049	2011 AF_{88}	—	January 3, 2011	Mount Lemmon	Mount Lemmon Survey	EUP	2.5 km	MPC · JPL
816050	2011 AJ_{89}	—	January 26, 2017	Mount Lemmon	Mount Lemmon Survey	T_{j} (2.98) · EUP	3.1 km	MPC · JPL
816051	2011 AH_{91}	—	August 15, 2013	Haleakala	Pan-STARRS 1	·	1.3 km	MPC · JPL
816052	2011 AG_{92}	—	January 14, 2011	Kitt Peak	Spacewatch	·	1.1 km	MPC · JPL
816053	2011 AE_{93}	—	January 14, 2011	Mount Lemmon	Mount Lemmon Survey	HNS	880 m	MPC · JPL
816054	2011 AQ_{94}	—	January 11, 2011	Mount Lemmon	Mount Lemmon Survey	V	500 m	MPC · JPL
816055	2011 AT_{94}	—	December 5, 2010	Kitt Peak	Spacewatch	·	450 m	MPC · JPL
816056	2011 AA_{96}	—	January 14, 2011	Mount Lemmon	Mount Lemmon Survey	·	500 m	MPC · JPL
816057	2011 AA_{97}	—	January 4, 2011	Mount Lemmon	Mount Lemmon Survey	·	1.1 km	MPC · JPL
816058	2011 AS_{97}	—	January 13, 2011	Mount Lemmon	Mount Lemmon Survey	·	2.1 km	MPC · JPL
816059	2011 AP_{99}	—	January 2, 2011	Mount Lemmon	Mount Lemmon Survey	·	2.1 km	MPC · JPL
816060	2011 AQ_{99}	—	January 12, 2011	Mount Lemmon	Mount Lemmon Survey	·	2.7 km	MPC · JPL
816061	2011 AH_{102}	—	January 13, 2011	Catalina	CSS	PHO	820 m	MPC · JPL
816062	2011 AW_{103}	—	January 9, 2011	Mount Lemmon	Mount Lemmon Survey	H	450 m	MPC · JPL
816063	2011 AN_{104}	—	January 12, 2011	Mount Lemmon	Mount Lemmon Survey	·	1.1 km	MPC · JPL
816064	2011 AF_{105}	—	January 2, 2011	Mount Lemmon	Mount Lemmon Survey	·	370 m	MPC · JPL
816065	2011 AK_{105}	—	January 13, 2011	Mount Lemmon	Mount Lemmon Survey	H	400 m	MPC · JPL
816066	2011 AW_{105}	—	January 14, 2011	Mount Lemmon	Mount Lemmon Survey	EUN	900 m	MPC · JPL
816067	2011 AM_{107}	—	January 13, 2011	Mount Lemmon	Mount Lemmon Survey	·	520 m	MPC · JPL
816068	2011 AQ_{112}	—	January 8, 2011	Mount Lemmon	Mount Lemmon Survey	·	1.4 km	MPC · JPL
816069	2011 BH_{9}	—	January 16, 2011	Mount Lemmon	Mount Lemmon Survey	·	510 m	MPC · JPL
816070	2011 BD_{11}	—	January 23, 2011	Mount Lemmon	Mount Lemmon Survey	·	430 m	MPC · JPL
816071	2011 BK_{13}	—	January 8, 2011	Mount Lemmon	Mount Lemmon Survey	·	1.0 km	MPC · JPL
816072	2011 BW_{17}	—	January 25, 2011	Kitt Peak	Spacewatch	·	780 m	MPC · JPL
816073	2011 BV_{23}	—	January 27, 2011	Kitt Peak	Spacewatch	H	400 m	MPC · JPL
816074	2011 BP_{37}	—	January 12, 2011	ESA OGS	ESA OGS	·	2.5 km	MPC · JPL
816075	2011 BS_{38}	—	January 28, 2011	Mount Lemmon	Mount Lemmon Survey	·	400 m	MPC · JPL
816076	2011 BU_{52}	—	January 12, 2011	Kitt Peak	Spacewatch	H	420 m	MPC · JPL
816077	2011 BB_{59}	—	January 30, 2011	Mount Lemmon	Mount Lemmon Survey	·	1.4 km	MPC · JPL
816078	2011 BS_{64}	—	January 29, 2011	Kitt Peak	Spacewatch	·	580 m	MPC · JPL
816079	2011 BC_{65}	—	January 29, 2011	Kitt Peak	Spacewatch	·	1.2 km	MPC · JPL
816080	2011 BJ_{73}	—	February 5, 2011	Haleakala	Pan-STARRS 1	·	1.1 km	MPC · JPL
816081	2011 BT_{73}	—	February 25, 2011	Mount Lemmon	Mount Lemmon Survey	·	930 m	MPC · JPL
816082	2011 BP_{86}	—	January 27, 2011	Mount Lemmon	Mount Lemmon Survey	·	470 m	MPC · JPL
816083	2011 BS_{86}	—	January 14, 2011	Kitt Peak	Spacewatch	·	580 m	MPC · JPL
816084	2011 BX_{96}	—	December 8, 2010	Mount Lemmon	Mount Lemmon Survey	·	2.1 km	MPC · JPL
816085	2011 BF_{102}	—	January 27, 2011	Kitt Peak	Spacewatch	·	680 m	MPC · JPL
816086	2011 BK_{103}	—	January 27, 2011	Kitt Peak	Spacewatch	·	810 m	MPC · JPL
816087	2011 BC_{106}	—	January 28, 2011	Mount Lemmon	Mount Lemmon Survey	·	450 m	MPC · JPL
816088	2011 BW_{106}	—	January 29, 2011	Mount Lemmon	Mount Lemmon Survey	·	2.0 km	MPC · JPL
816089	2011 BN_{109}	—	February 5, 2011	Haleakala	Pan-STARRS 1	·	610 m	MPC · JPL
816090	2011 BG_{111}	—	February 10, 2011	Mount Lemmon	Mount Lemmon Survey	·	2.1 km	MPC · JPL
816091	2011 BD_{113}	—	March 2, 2011	Mount Lemmon	Mount Lemmon Survey	·	680 m	MPC · JPL
816092	2011 BR_{114}	—	January 12, 2011	Mount Lemmon	Mount Lemmon Survey	·	840 m	MPC · JPL
816093	2011 BC_{115}	—	May 11, 2008	Kitt Peak	Spacewatch	·	540 m	MPC · JPL
816094	2011 BU_{115}	—	January 23, 2011	Mount Lemmon	Mount Lemmon Survey	·	1.1 km	MPC · JPL
816095	2011 BR_{122}	—	December 9, 2010	Mount Lemmon	Mount Lemmon Survey	·	2.5 km	MPC · JPL
816096	2011 BF_{123}	—	April 1, 2008	Kitt Peak	Spacewatch	·	610 m	MPC · JPL
816097	2011 BG_{127}	—	January 16, 2011	Mount Lemmon	Mount Lemmon Survey	·	640 m	MPC · JPL
816098	2011 BV_{128}	—	January 28, 2011	Mount Lemmon	Mount Lemmon Survey	·	2.0 km	MPC · JPL
816099	2011 BP_{131}	—	January 28, 2011	Mount Lemmon	Mount Lemmon Survey	H	290 m	MPC · JPL
816100	2011 BR_{132}	—	January 28, 2011	Mount Lemmon	Mount Lemmon Survey	·	870 m	MPC · JPL

== 816101–816200 ==
back to top

Designation			Discovery			Properties		Ref
Permanent	Provisional	Named after	Date	Site	Discoverer(s)	Category	Diam.	Ref
816101	2011 BO_{138}	—	January 29, 2011	Mount Lemmon	Mount Lemmon Survey	·	870 m	MPC · JPL
816102	2011 BS_{141}	—	January 10, 2011	Mount Lemmon	Mount Lemmon Survey	·	520 m	MPC · JPL
816103	2011 BX_{142}	—	January 29, 2011	Mount Lemmon	Mount Lemmon Survey	H	350 m	MPC · JPL
816104	2011 BB_{148}	—	February 29, 2008	Kitt Peak	Spacewatch	·	610 m	MPC · JPL
816105	2011 BS_{148}	—	January 29, 2011	Mount Lemmon	Mount Lemmon Survey	·	1.3 km	MPC · JPL
816106	2011 BF_{150}	—	January 10, 2011	Mount Lemmon	Mount Lemmon Survey	·	1.8 km	MPC · JPL
816107	2011 BL_{150}	—	January 29, 2011	Mount Lemmon	Mount Lemmon Survey	(2076)	590 m	MPC · JPL
816108	2011 BR_{151}	—	February 23, 2007	Mount Lemmon	Mount Lemmon Survey	ADE	1.2 km	MPC · JPL
816109	2011 BG_{153}	—	December 12, 2010	Kitt Peak	Spacewatch	·	2.2 km	MPC · JPL
816110	2011 BO_{153}	—	October 17, 2010	Mount Lemmon	Mount Lemmon Survey	·	1.8 km	MPC · JPL
816111	2011 BV_{155}	—	September 25, 2006	Kitt Peak	Spacewatch	·	410 m	MPC · JPL
816112	2011 BE_{156}	—	January 28, 2011	Mount Lemmon	Mount Lemmon Survey	·	500 m	MPC · JPL
816113	2011 BF_{157}	—	November 25, 2002	Kitt Peak	Spacewatch	·	890 m	MPC · JPL
816114	2011 BW_{158}	—	January 29, 2011	Mount Lemmon	Mount Lemmon Survey	·	1.2 km	MPC · JPL
816115	2011 BY_{158}	—	January 29, 2011	Mount Lemmon	Mount Lemmon Survey	·	1.5 km	MPC · JPL
816116	2011 BX_{161}	—	January 10, 2011	Kitt Peak	Spacewatch	MAS	510 m	MPC · JPL
816117	2011 BF_{165}	—	January 26, 2011	Mount Lemmon	Mount Lemmon Survey	·	970 m	MPC · JPL
816118	2011 BP_{168}	—	February 25, 2011	Mount Lemmon	Mount Lemmon Survey	·	2.2 km	MPC · JPL
816119	2011 BL_{172}	—	January 27, 2011	Kitt Peak	Spacewatch	·	510 m	MPC · JPL
816120	2011 BY_{173}	—	November 11, 2013	Mount Lemmon	Mount Lemmon Survey	·	620 m	MPC · JPL
816121	2011 BE_{174}	—	January 30, 2011	Mount Lemmon	Mount Lemmon Survey	·	2.6 km	MPC · JPL
816122	2011 BM_{175}	—	January 25, 2011	Mount Lemmon	Mount Lemmon Survey	·	1.7 km	MPC · JPL
816123	2011 BY_{175}	—	January 14, 2015	Haleakala	Pan-STARRS 1	·	1.1 km	MPC · JPL
816124	2011 BK_{176}	—	January 29, 2011	Mount Lemmon	Mount Lemmon Survey	(5)	840 m	MPC · JPL
816125	2011 BT_{176}	—	January 24, 2011	Mount Lemmon	Mount Lemmon Survey	·	1.4 km	MPC · JPL
816126	2011 BF_{178}	—	April 3, 2016	Haleakala	Pan-STARRS 1	·	1.1 km	MPC · JPL
816127	2011 BL_{178}	—	February 12, 2011	Mount Lemmon	Mount Lemmon Survey	·	2.5 km	MPC · JPL
816128	2011 BD_{180}	—	February 11, 2011	Mount Lemmon	Mount Lemmon Survey	VER	2.2 km	MPC · JPL
816129	2011 BH_{180}	—	February 7, 2011	Mount Lemmon	Mount Lemmon Survey	·	460 m	MPC · JPL
816130	2011 BZ_{181}	—	June 18, 2013	Haleakala	Pan-STARRS 1	·	2.2 km	MPC · JPL
816131	2011 BL_{182}	—	January 30, 2011	Mount Lemmon	Mount Lemmon Survey	H	350 m	MPC · JPL
816132	2011 BY_{182}	—	November 4, 2016	Haleakala	Pan-STARRS 1	·	550 m	MPC · JPL
816133	2011 BQ_{183}	—	October 28, 2014	Haleakala	Pan-STARRS 1	·	1.3 km	MPC · JPL
816134	2011 BX_{183}	—	January 30, 2011	Kitt Peak	Spacewatch	H	440 m	MPC · JPL
816135	2011 BY_{183}	—	February 7, 2011	Mount Lemmon	Mount Lemmon Survey	·	1.3 km	MPC · JPL
816136	2011 BC_{184}	—	February 10, 2011	Mount Lemmon	Mount Lemmon Survey	·	1.1 km	MPC · JPL
816137	2011 BP_{184}	—	January 23, 2011	Mount Lemmon	Mount Lemmon Survey	·	2.2 km	MPC · JPL
816138	2011 BA_{185}	—	January 30, 2011	Mount Lemmon	Mount Lemmon Survey	·	850 m	MPC · JPL
816139	2011 BK_{185}	—	February 7, 2011	Mount Lemmon	Mount Lemmon Survey	·	2.5 km	MPC · JPL
816140	2011 BD_{186}	—	June 29, 2015	Haleakala	Pan-STARRS 1	·	910 m	MPC · JPL
816141	2011 BR_{187}	—	January 29, 2011	Mount Lemmon	Mount Lemmon Survey	TIR	2.6 km	MPC · JPL
816142	2011 BU_{187}	—	February 9, 2011	Mount Lemmon	Mount Lemmon Survey	PHO	770 m	MPC · JPL
816143	2011 BS_{188}	—	July 11, 2016	Haleakala	Pan-STARRS 1	·	540 m	MPC · JPL
816144	2011 BQ_{192}	—	August 23, 2014	Haleakala	Pan-STARRS 1	EOS	1.5 km	MPC · JPL
816145	2011 BU_{192}	—	January 28, 2011	Mount Lemmon	Mount Lemmon Survey	·	950 m	MPC · JPL
816146	2011 BM_{196}	—	January 23, 2011	Mount Lemmon	Mount Lemmon Survey	·	690 m	MPC · JPL
816147	2011 BW_{197}	—	January 24, 2011	Mount Lemmon	Mount Lemmon Survey	·	1.3 km	MPC · JPL
816148	2011 BM_{199}	—	January 30, 2011	Mount Lemmon	Mount Lemmon Survey	·	1.9 km	MPC · JPL
816149	2011 BP_{199}	—	January 29, 2011	Mount Lemmon	Mount Lemmon Survey	·	440 m	MPC · JPL
816150	2011 BR_{199}	—	January 23, 2011	Mount Lemmon	Mount Lemmon Survey	·	1.2 km	MPC · JPL
816151	2011 BK_{200}	—	January 26, 2011	Kitt Peak	Spacewatch	·	560 m	MPC · JPL
816152	2011 BO_{200}	—	January 28, 2011	Mount Lemmon	Mount Lemmon Survey	·	490 m	MPC · JPL
816153	2011 BC_{202}	—	January 29, 2011	Mount Lemmon	Mount Lemmon Survey	EUN	670 m	MPC · JPL
816154	2011 BC_{203}	—	January 29, 2011	Mount Lemmon	Mount Lemmon Survey	·	2.7 km	MPC · JPL
816155	2011 BO_{206}	—	January 30, 2011	Mount Lemmon	Mount Lemmon Survey	·	780 m	MPC · JPL
816156	2011 CU_{11}	—	September 21, 2009	Mount Lemmon	Mount Lemmon Survey	·	590 m	MPC · JPL
816157	2011 CB_{14}	—	January 11, 2011	Kitt Peak	Spacewatch	·	910 m	MPC · JPL
816158	2011 CX_{16}	—	January 26, 2011	Catalina	CSS	T_{j} (2.97)	3.0 km	MPC · JPL
816159	2011 CC_{20}	—	January 27, 2011	Kitt Peak	Spacewatch	NYS	710 m	MPC · JPL
816160	2011 CV_{26}	—	February 7, 2011	Mount Lemmon	Mount Lemmon Survey	·	720 m	MPC · JPL
816161	2011 CE_{35}	—	January 29, 2011	Kitt Peak	Spacewatch	·	640 m	MPC · JPL
816162	2011 CZ_{37}	—	February 5, 2011	Mount Lemmon	Mount Lemmon Survey	·	910 m	MPC · JPL
816163	2011 CQ_{38}	—	February 5, 2011	Mount Lemmon	Mount Lemmon Survey	NYS	770 m	MPC · JPL
816164	2011 CC_{39}	—	February 5, 2011	Catalina	CSS	·	2.0 km	MPC · JPL
816165	2011 CN_{43}	—	January 28, 2011	Mount Lemmon	Mount Lemmon Survey	LIX	2.5 km	MPC · JPL
816166	2011 CR_{46}	—	February 1, 2006	Mount Lemmon	Mount Lemmon Survey	H	440 m	MPC · JPL
816167	2011 CU_{51}	—	February 7, 2011	Mount Lemmon	Mount Lemmon Survey	·	2.3 km	MPC · JPL
816168	2011 CF_{55}	—	February 8, 2011	Mount Lemmon	Mount Lemmon Survey	·	460 m	MPC · JPL
816169	2011 CZ_{55}	—	February 8, 2011	Mount Lemmon	Mount Lemmon Survey	·	500 m	MPC · JPL
816170	2011 CV_{56}	—	February 8, 2011	Mount Lemmon	Mount Lemmon Survey	·	420 m	MPC · JPL
816171	2011 CA_{57}	—	February 8, 2011	Mount Lemmon	Mount Lemmon Survey	·	2.3 km	MPC · JPL
816172	2011 CH_{57}	—	February 8, 2011	Mount Lemmon	Mount Lemmon Survey	·	1.0 km	MPC · JPL
816173	2011 CT_{59}	—	February 8, 2011	Mount Lemmon	Mount Lemmon Survey	·	690 m	MPC · JPL
816174	2011 CM_{60}	—	January 15, 2011	Mount Lemmon	Mount Lemmon Survey	·	1.2 km	MPC · JPL
816175	2011 CJ_{63}	—	February 10, 2011	Mount Lemmon	Mount Lemmon Survey	·	1.2 km	MPC · JPL
816176	2011 CF_{67}	—	February 3, 2011	Dauban	C. Rinner, Kugel, F.	NYS	800 m	MPC · JPL
816177	2011 CG_{67}	—	January 10, 2007	Kitt Peak	Spacewatch	·	1.0 km	MPC · JPL
816178	2011 CE_{76}	—	October 24, 2005	Mauna Kea	A. Boattini	·	1.5 km	MPC · JPL
816179	2011 CT_{77}	—	February 7, 2011	Catalina	CSS	H	530 m	MPC · JPL
816180	2011 CC_{80}	—	April 2, 2006	Mount Lemmon	Mount Lemmon Survey	·	1.8 km	MPC · JPL
816181	2011 CV_{84}	—	February 5, 2011	Haleakala	Pan-STARRS 1	·	2.1 km	MPC · JPL
816182	2011 CN_{87}	—	February 5, 2011	Haleakala	Pan-STARRS 1	H	410 m	MPC · JPL
816183	2011 CS_{87}	—	March 6, 2011	Mount Lemmon	Mount Lemmon Survey	·	2.3 km	MPC · JPL
816184	2011 CB_{88}	—	March 5, 2011	Mount Lemmon	Mount Lemmon Survey	·	1.0 km	MPC · JPL
816185	2011 CU_{92}	—	February 12, 2011	Mount Lemmon	Mount Lemmon Survey	·	1.3 km	MPC · JPL
816186	2011 CE_{97}	—	March 2, 2011	Mount Lemmon	Mount Lemmon Survey	·	470 m	MPC · JPL
816187	2011 CT_{97}	—	February 12, 2011	Mount Lemmon	Mount Lemmon Survey	·	600 m	MPC · JPL
816188	2011 CP_{100}	—	February 5, 2011	Haleakala	Pan-STARRS 1	·	490 m	MPC · JPL
816189	2011 CW_{105}	—	February 12, 2011	Mount Lemmon	Mount Lemmon Survey	·	540 m	MPC · JPL
816190	2011 CR_{108}	—	January 28, 2011	Kitt Peak	Spacewatch	·	810 m	MPC · JPL
816191	2011 CE_{110}	—	March 6, 2011	Mount Lemmon	Mount Lemmon Survey	·	460 m	MPC · JPL
816192	2011 CK_{110}	—	November 18, 2006	Kitt Peak	Spacewatch	·	510 m	MPC · JPL
816193	2011 CW_{111}	—	February 5, 2011	Haleakala	Pan-STARRS 1	·	750 m	MPC · JPL
816194	2011 CS_{113}	—	February 5, 2011	Haleakala	Pan-STARRS 1	·	700 m	MPC · JPL
816195	2011 CD_{117}	—	February 9, 2011	Mount Lemmon	Mount Lemmon Survey	·	940 m	MPC · JPL
816196	2011 CW_{120}	—	February 5, 2011	Catalina	CSS	·	1.7 km	MPC · JPL
816197	2011 CF_{121}	—	February 10, 2011	Mount Lemmon	Mount Lemmon Survey	·	2.1 km	MPC · JPL
816198	2011 CR_{121}	—	February 7, 2011	Mount Lemmon	Mount Lemmon Survey	NYS	690 m	MPC · JPL
816199	2011 CS_{122}	—	November 20, 2015	Mount Lemmon	Mount Lemmon Survey	H	390 m	MPC · JPL
816200	2011 CA_{123}	—	March 9, 2011	Mount Lemmon	Mount Lemmon Survey	·	720 m	MPC · JPL

== 816201–816300 ==
back to top

Designation			Discovery			Properties		Ref
Permanent	Provisional	Named after	Date	Site	Discoverer(s)	Category	Diam.	Ref
816201	2011 CC_{123}	—	October 5, 2013	Haleakala	Pan-STARRS 1	·	1.3 km	MPC · JPL
816202	2011 CT_{123}	—	February 8, 2011	Mount Lemmon	Mount Lemmon Survey	·	2.2 km	MPC · JPL
816203	2011 CW_{123}	—	February 11, 2011	Mount Lemmon	Mount Lemmon Survey	H	440 m	MPC · JPL
816204	2011 CM_{126}	—	February 10, 2011	Mount Lemmon	Mount Lemmon Survey	V	500 m	MPC · JPL
816205	2011 CP_{126}	—	February 13, 2011	Mount Lemmon	Mount Lemmon Survey	·	670 m	MPC · JPL
816206	2011 CY_{126}	—	May 30, 2016	Haleakala	Pan-STARRS 1	·	1.1 km	MPC · JPL
816207	2011 CW_{127}	—	March 17, 2018	Haleakala	Pan-STARRS 1	·	470 m	MPC · JPL
816208	2011 CZ_{130}	—	February 8, 2011	Kitt Peak	Spacewatch	·	550 m	MPC · JPL
816209	2011 CT_{133}	—	February 10, 2011	Mount Lemmon	Mount Lemmon Survey	·	480 m	MPC · JPL
816210	2011 CJ_{134}	—	February 3, 2011	Piszkés-tető	K. Sárneczky, Z. Kuli	V	470 m	MPC · JPL
816211	2011 CB_{135}	—	February 5, 2011	Mount Lemmon	Mount Lemmon Survey	·	700 m	MPC · JPL
816212	2011 CD_{136}	—	February 12, 2011	Mount Lemmon	Mount Lemmon Survey	·	1.2 km	MPC · JPL
816213	2011 CT_{136}	—	February 8, 2011	Mount Lemmon	Mount Lemmon Survey	·	580 m	MPC · JPL
816214	2011 CX_{136}	—	February 10, 2011	Mount Lemmon	Mount Lemmon Survey	H	340 m	MPC · JPL
816215	2011 CX_{138}	—	February 13, 2011	Mount Lemmon	Mount Lemmon Survey	·	480 m	MPC · JPL
816216	2011 CT_{140}	—	February 8, 2011	Mount Lemmon	Mount Lemmon Survey	·	1.1 km	MPC · JPL
816217	2011 CB_{143}	—	February 10, 2011	Mount Lemmon	Mount Lemmon Survey	V	470 m	MPC · JPL
816218	2011 CB_{144}	—	February 8, 2011	Mount Lemmon	Mount Lemmon Survey	CLA	920 m	MPC · JPL
816219	2011 CU_{145}	—	February 10, 2011	Mount Lemmon	Mount Lemmon Survey	·	660 m	MPC · JPL
816220	2011 CG_{147}	—	February 11, 2011	Mount Lemmon	Mount Lemmon Survey	·	470 m	MPC · JPL
816221	2011 CV_{147}	—	February 8, 2011	Mount Lemmon	Mount Lemmon Survey	·	650 m	MPC · JPL
816222	2011 CP_{149}	—	February 8, 2011	Mount Lemmon	Mount Lemmon Survey	·	960 m	MPC · JPL
816223	2011 DM_{1}	—	February 22, 2011	Kitt Peak	Spacewatch	·	560 m	MPC · JPL
816224	2011 DH_{2}	—	February 23, 2011	Kitt Peak	Spacewatch	·	620 m	MPC · JPL
816225	2011 DC_{7}	—	October 2, 2006	Kitt Peak	Spacewatch	·	420 m	MPC · JPL
816226	2011 DR_{7}	—	February 22, 2007	Kitt Peak	Spacewatch	·	910 m	MPC · JPL
816227	2011 DD_{8}	—	February 22, 2011	Kitt Peak	Spacewatch	·	2.1 km	MPC · JPL
816228	2011 DR_{19}	—	February 28, 2011	Kachina	Hobart, J.	·	3.1 km	MPC · JPL
816229	2011 DW_{28}	—	April 12, 2004	Kitt Peak	Spacewatch	MAS	530 m	MPC · JPL
816230	2011 DC_{29}	—	February 8, 2011	Mount Lemmon	Mount Lemmon Survey	·	2.1 km	MPC · JPL
816231	2011 DN_{29}	—	February 10, 2011	Mount Lemmon	Mount Lemmon Survey	·	1.2 km	MPC · JPL
816232	2011 DF_{30}	—	February 25, 2011	Mount Lemmon	Mount Lemmon Survey	·	2.3 km	MPC · JPL
816233	2011 DX_{31}	—	February 17, 2004	Kitt Peak	Spacewatch	·	500 m	MPC · JPL
816234	2011 DL_{36}	—	February 25, 2011	Mount Lemmon	Mount Lemmon Survey	·	1.7 km	MPC · JPL
816235	2011 DQ_{38}	—	February 25, 2011	Mount Lemmon	Mount Lemmon Survey	BAR	870 m	MPC · JPL
816236	2011 DC_{39}	—	January 28, 2011	Kitt Peak	Spacewatch	·	520 m	MPC · JPL
816237	2011 DM_{41}	—	February 12, 2004	Kitt Peak	Spacewatch	·	510 m	MPC · JPL
816238	2011 DB_{44}	—	October 16, 2009	Mount Lemmon	Mount Lemmon Survey	CLA	1.2 km	MPC · JPL
816239	2011 DF_{48}	—	February 22, 2003	Palomar	NEAT	H	340 m	MPC · JPL
816240	2011 DL_{50}	—	January 26, 2011	Mount Lemmon	Mount Lemmon Survey	·	1.6 km	MPC · JPL
816241	2011 DP_{51}	—	February 25, 2011	Catalina	CSS	·	1.1 km	MPC · JPL
816242	2011 DD_{52}	—	February 26, 2011	Mount Lemmon	Mount Lemmon Survey	·	670 m	MPC · JPL
816243	2011 DU_{52}	—	February 25, 2011	Mount Lemmon	Mount Lemmon Survey	·	640 m	MPC · JPL
816244	2011 DC_{53}	—	February 26, 2011	Kitt Peak	Spacewatch	V	420 m	MPC · JPL
816245	2011 DJ_{53}	—	November 17, 2006	Kitt Peak	Spacewatch	·	540 m	MPC · JPL
816246	2011 DU_{54}	—	February 25, 2011	Mount Lemmon	Mount Lemmon Survey	·	1 km	MPC · JPL
816247	2011 DJ_{55}	—	March 18, 2018	Haleakala	Pan-STARRS 1	·	510 m	MPC · JPL
816248	2011 DN_{55}	—	August 13, 2012	Kitt Peak	Spacewatch	·	780 m	MPC · JPL
816249	2011 DZ_{55}	—	February 25, 2011	Mount Lemmon	Mount Lemmon Survey	·	630 m	MPC · JPL
816250	2011 DS_{56}	—	February 26, 2011	Mount Lemmon	Mount Lemmon Survey	·	470 m	MPC · JPL
816251	2011 DO_{58}	—	February 25, 2011	Mount Lemmon	Mount Lemmon Survey	·	560 m	MPC · JPL
816252	2011 EE_{3}	—	March 1, 2011	Kitt Peak	Spacewatch	·	1.9 km	MPC · JPL
816253	2011 EV_{11}	—	December 14, 2010	Mount Lemmon	Mount Lemmon Survey	·	590 m	MPC · JPL
816254	2011 EK_{13}	—	February 13, 2011	Mount Lemmon	Mount Lemmon Survey	·	640 m	MPC · JPL
816255	2011 EH_{14}	—	March 2, 2011	Bergisch Gladbach	W. Bickel	H	420 m	MPC · JPL
816256	2011 EO_{15}	—	March 4, 2011	Kitt Peak	Spacewatch	·	2.3 km	MPC · JPL
816257	2011 EG_{20}	—	February 10, 2011	Catalina	CSS	·	590 m	MPC · JPL
816258	2011 EC_{22}	—	March 3, 2000	Socorro	LINEAR	MAS	610 m	MPC · JPL
816259	2011 EV_{28}	—	March 7, 2011	Piszkés-tető	K. Sárneczky, J. Kelemen	·	570 m	MPC · JPL
816260	2011 EU_{30}	—	March 5, 2011	Catalina	CSS	·	2.7 km	MPC · JPL
816261	2011 EK_{35}	—	February 26, 2004	Kitt Peak	Deep Ecliptic Survey	·	690 m	MPC · JPL
816262	2011 EB_{38}	—	March 6, 2011	Kitt Peak	Spacewatch	(2076)	580 m	MPC · JPL
816263	2011 ET_{42}	—	March 5, 2011	Catalina	CSS	·	360 m	MPC · JPL
816264	2011 EZ_{44}	—	March 9, 2011	Kitt Peak	Spacewatch	·	1.1 km	MPC · JPL
816265	2011 EU_{46}	—	October 29, 2006	Mount Lemmon	Mount Lemmon Survey	(2076)	660 m	MPC · JPL
816266	2011 EN_{47}	—	September 26, 2003	Sacramento Peak	SDSS	·	2.2 km	MPC · JPL
816267	2011 EE_{48}	—	March 9, 2011	Mount Lemmon	Mount Lemmon Survey	·	650 m	MPC · JPL
816268	2011 ET_{49}	—	March 10, 2011	Mount Lemmon	Mount Lemmon Survey	H	400 m	MPC · JPL
816269	2011 EK_{53}	—	March 9, 2011	Kitt Peak	Spacewatch	·	2.4 km	MPC · JPL
816270	2011 ET_{66}	—	February 23, 2011	Kitt Peak	Spacewatch	H	380 m	MPC · JPL
816271	2011 EN_{68}	—	April 11, 2004	Palomar	NEAT	·	730 m	MPC · JPL
816272	2011 EQ_{68}	—	March 2, 2011	Kitt Peak	Spacewatch	·	650 m	MPC · JPL
816273	2011 EU_{68}	—	March 10, 2011	Kitt Peak	Spacewatch	·	1.0 km	MPC · JPL
816274	2011 EU_{69}	—	March 2, 2011	Kitt Peak	Spacewatch	·	830 m	MPC · JPL
816275	2011 EU_{71}	—	March 2, 2011	Kitt Peak	Spacewatch	·	1.6 km	MPC · JPL
816276	2011 EH_{72}	—	February 26, 2011	Kitt Peak	Spacewatch	·	480 m	MPC · JPL
816277	2011 EO_{90}	—	March 2, 2011	Mount Lemmon	Mount Lemmon Survey	PHO	750 m	MPC · JPL
816278	2011 EV_{92}	—	March 14, 2011	Mount Lemmon	Mount Lemmon Survey	·	820 m	MPC · JPL
816279	2011 EZ_{92}	—	March 4, 2011	Kitt Peak	Spacewatch	·	520 m	MPC · JPL
816280	2011 EK_{93}	—	October 1, 2014	Haleakala	Pan-STARRS 1	·	2.7 km	MPC · JPL
816281	2011 EY_{95}	—	March 21, 2018	Mount Lemmon	Mount Lemmon Survey	·	570 m	MPC · JPL
816282	2011 EC_{96}	—	August 9, 2013	Kitt Peak	Spacewatch	·	1.8 km	MPC · JPL
816283	2011 EG_{96}	—	August 18, 2017	Haleakala	Pan-STARRS 1	H	390 m	MPC · JPL
816284	2011 EP_{96}	—	August 14, 2013	Haleakala	Pan-STARRS 1	·	2.5 km	MPC · JPL
816285	2011 EL_{97}	—	August 17, 2012	Haleakala	Pan-STARRS 1	H	350 m	MPC · JPL
816286	2011 EW_{97}	—	March 13, 2011	Mount Lemmon	Mount Lemmon Survey	·	820 m	MPC · JPL
816287	2011 EG_{98}	—	March 4, 2011	Kitt Peak	Spacewatch	·	820 m	MPC · JPL
816288	2011 EO_{98}	—	March 4, 2011	Mount Lemmon	Mount Lemmon Survey	·	660 m	MPC · JPL
816289	2011 EF_{101}	—	March 6, 2011	Mount Lemmon	Mount Lemmon Survey	·	820 m	MPC · JPL
816290	2011 EO_{101}	—	March 6, 2011	Mount Lemmon	Mount Lemmon Survey	·	1.4 km	MPC · JPL
816291	2011 EC_{102}	—	March 6, 2011	Kitt Peak	Spacewatch	·	1.7 km	MPC · JPL
816292	2011 EV_{102}	—	March 5, 2011	Mount Lemmon	Mount Lemmon Survey	H	430 m	MPC · JPL
816293	2011 EU_{104}	—	March 9, 2011	Mount Lemmon	Mount Lemmon Survey	MRX	790 m	MPC · JPL
816294	2011 EB_{107}	—	March 4, 2011	Kitt Peak	Spacewatch	·	740 m	MPC · JPL
816295	2011 ET_{108}	—	March 13, 2011	Kitt Peak	Spacewatch	·	1.2 km	MPC · JPL
816296	2011 EG_{112}	—	March 6, 2011	Mount Lemmon	Mount Lemmon Survey	·	610 m	MPC · JPL
816297	2011 ER_{114}	—	March 4, 2011	Mount Lemmon	Mount Lemmon Survey	·	1.2 km	MPC · JPL
816298	2011 FT	—	March 23, 2011	Bergisch Gladbach	W. Bickel	·	470 m	MPC · JPL
816299	2011 FF_{21}	—	March 2, 2011	Kitt Peak	Spacewatch	·	520 m	MPC · JPL
816300	2011 FM_{22}	—	October 1, 2005	Kitt Peak	Spacewatch	·	620 m	MPC · JPL

== 816301–816400 ==
back to top

Designation			Discovery			Properties		Ref
Permanent	Provisional	Named after	Date	Site	Discoverer(s)	Category	Diam.	Ref
816301	2011 FN_{25}	—	March 29, 2011	Piszkés-tető	K. Sárneczky, Z. Kuli	·	1.9 km	MPC · JPL
816302	2011 FV_{25}	—	March 29, 2011	Piszkés-tető	K. Sárneczky, Z. Kuli	·	2.5 km	MPC · JPL
816303	2011 FS_{26}	—	March 30, 2011	Piszkés-tető	K. Sárneczky, Z. Kuli	·	850 m	MPC · JPL
816304	2011 FA_{27}	—	March 30, 2011	Piszkés-tető	K. Sárneczky, Z. Kuli	·	1.3 km	MPC · JPL
816305	2011 FF_{29}	—	March 9, 2011	Catalina	CSS	·	420 m	MPC · JPL
816306	2011 FF_{30}	—	March 26, 2011	Kitt Peak	Spacewatch	NYS	810 m	MPC · JPL
816307	2011 FC_{31}	—	February 23, 2011	Kitt Peak	Spacewatch	critical	570 m	MPC · JPL
816308	2011 FC_{33}	—	March 28, 2011	Kitt Peak	Spacewatch	·	650 m	MPC · JPL
816309	2011 FB_{37}	—	March 13, 2011	Kitt Peak	Spacewatch	·	500 m	MPC · JPL
816310	2011 FC_{39}	—	March 13, 2011	Kitt Peak	Spacewatch	·	940 m	MPC · JPL
816311	2011 FQ_{40}	—	March 1, 2011	Mount Lemmon	Mount Lemmon Survey	(194)	1.3 km	MPC · JPL
816312	2011 FH_{46}	—	March 6, 2011	Kitt Peak	Spacewatch	T_{j} (2.98)	2.0 km	MPC · JPL
816313	2011 FM_{46}	—	March 29, 2011	Kitt Peak	Spacewatch	·	600 m	MPC · JPL
816314	2011 FD_{47}	—	December 27, 2006	Mount Lemmon	Mount Lemmon Survey	·	810 m	MPC · JPL
816315	2011 FC_{49}	—	March 25, 2011	Haleakala	Pan-STARRS 1	·	1.3 km	MPC · JPL
816316	2011 FE_{49}	—	March 30, 2011	Mount Lemmon	Mount Lemmon Survey	·	560 m	MPC · JPL
816317	2011 FQ_{62}	—	March 30, 2011	Mount Lemmon	Mount Lemmon Survey	·	530 m	MPC · JPL
816318	2011 FD_{64}	—	March 29, 2011	Mount Lemmon	Mount Lemmon Survey	WIT	760 m	MPC · JPL
816319	2011 FE_{65}	—	March 30, 2011	Mount Lemmon	Mount Lemmon Survey	·	720 m	MPC · JPL
816320	2011 FP_{65}	—	March 30, 2011	Mount Lemmon	Mount Lemmon Survey	·	610 m	MPC · JPL
816321	2011 FT_{69}	—	March 1, 2011	Mount Lemmon	Mount Lemmon Survey	·	780 m	MPC · JPL
816322	2011 FK_{76}	—	March 6, 2011	Kitt Peak	Spacewatch	·	1.2 km	MPC · JPL
816323	2011 FM_{77}	—	November 21, 2009	Kitt Peak	Spacewatch	THM	1.8 km	MPC · JPL
816324	2011 FT_{77}	—	March 18, 2001	Kitt Peak	Spacewatch	·	450 m	MPC · JPL
816325	2011 FY_{79}	—	March 2, 2011	Kitt Peak	Spacewatch	·	1.1 km	MPC · JPL
816326	2011 FO_{81}	—	March 28, 2011	Mount Lemmon	Mount Lemmon Survey	·	460 m	MPC · JPL
816327	2011 FK_{83}	—	March 2, 2011	Kitt Peak	Spacewatch	·	680 m	MPC · JPL
816328	2011 FM_{84}	—	September 7, 2008	Mount Lemmon	Mount Lemmon Survey	·	550 m	MPC · JPL
816329	2011 FD_{88}	—	March 25, 2011	Kitt Peak	Spacewatch	·	2.2 km	MPC · JPL
816330	2011 FM_{93}	—	March 28, 2011	Mount Lemmon	Mount Lemmon Survey	MAS	520 m	MPC · JPL
816331	2011 FV_{94}	—	November 25, 2006	Kitt Peak	Spacewatch	·	500 m	MPC · JPL
816332	2011 FY_{96}	—	March 29, 2011	Mount Lemmon	Mount Lemmon Survey	·	2.2 km	MPC · JPL
816333	2011 FQ_{97}	—	October 27, 2005	Mount Lemmon	Mount Lemmon Survey	·	890 m	MPC · JPL
816334	2011 FD_{100}	—	March 30, 2011	Mount Lemmon	Mount Lemmon Survey	·	910 m	MPC · JPL
816335	2011 FN_{101}	—	March 30, 2011	Mount Lemmon	Mount Lemmon Survey	V	480 m	MPC · JPL
816336	2011 FN_{106}	—	April 1, 2011	Mount Lemmon	Mount Lemmon Survey	·	560 m	MPC · JPL
816337	2011 FN_{108}	—	April 5, 2011	Mount Lemmon	Mount Lemmon Survey	·	1.3 km	MPC · JPL
816338	2011 FO_{110}	—	April 1, 2011	Mount Lemmon	Mount Lemmon Survey	·	640 m	MPC · JPL
816339	2011 FW_{112}	—	April 1, 2011	Mount Lemmon	Mount Lemmon Survey	·	850 m	MPC · JPL
816340	2011 FB_{117}	—	April 2, 2011	Mount Lemmon	Mount Lemmon Survey	·	530 m	MPC · JPL
816341	2011 FQ_{122}	—	April 5, 2011	Mount Lemmon	Mount Lemmon Survey	·	670 m	MPC · JPL
816342	2011 FH_{124}	—	October 1, 2008	Mount Lemmon	Mount Lemmon Survey	·	1.3 km	MPC · JPL
816343	2011 FS_{126}	—	March 1, 2011	La Sagra	OAM	·	1.5 km	MPC · JPL
816344	2011 FL_{127}	—	March 25, 2011	Mount Lemmon	Mount Lemmon Survey	·	1.1 km	MPC · JPL
816345	2011 FH_{128}	—	April 8, 2003	Palomar	NEAT	·	1.3 km	MPC · JPL
816346	2011 FU_{134}	—	March 28, 2011	Mount Lemmon	Mount Lemmon Survey	·	590 m	MPC · JPL
816347	2011 FX_{142}	—	March 28, 2011	Mount Lemmon	Mount Lemmon Survey	·	540 m	MPC · JPL
816348	2011 FO_{155}	—	March 28, 2011	Mount Lemmon	Mount Lemmon Survey	·	2.3 km	MPC · JPL
816349	2011 FW_{155}	—	March 26, 2011	Mount Lemmon	Mount Lemmon Survey	·	650 m	MPC · JPL
816350	2011 FL_{157}	—	March 23, 2011	Palomar	Palomar Transient Factory	·	2.3 km	MPC · JPL
816351	2011 FO_{159}	—	March 29, 2011	Kitt Peak	Spacewatch	·	890 m	MPC · JPL
816352	2011 FQ_{159}	—	March 30, 2011	Mount Lemmon	Mount Lemmon Survey	·	1.4 km	MPC · JPL
816353	2011 FW_{160}	—	March 24, 2011	Kitt Peak	Spacewatch	·	1.2 km	MPC · JPL
816354	2011 FH_{161}	—	March 26, 2011	Mount Lemmon	Mount Lemmon Survey	·	800 m	MPC · JPL
816355	2011 FQ_{161}	—	March 28, 2011	Mount Lemmon	Mount Lemmon Survey	·	440 m	MPC · JPL
816356	2011 FU_{162}	—	March 26, 2011	Mount Lemmon	Mount Lemmon Survey	·	1.0 km	MPC · JPL
816357	2011 FX_{163}	—	April 18, 2015	Haleakala	Pan-STARRS 1	·	790 m	MPC · JPL
816358	2011 FV_{167}	—	March 28, 2011	Kitt Peak	Spacewatch	·	890 m	MPC · JPL
816359	2011 FD_{168}	—	February 10, 2007	Mount Lemmon	Mount Lemmon Survey	·	780 m	MPC · JPL
816360	2011 FM_{168}	—	March 31, 2011	Mount Lemmon	Mount Lemmon Survey	·	1.3 km	MPC · JPL
816361	2011 FQ_{168}	—	March 31, 2011	Mount Lemmon	Mount Lemmon Survey	·	540 m	MPC · JPL
816362	2011 FT_{168}	—	March 2, 2011	Kitt Peak	Spacewatch	·	480 m	MPC · JPL
816363	2011 FM_{169}	—	March 30, 2011	Haleakala	Pan-STARRS 1	·	1.4 km	MPC · JPL
816364	2011 FT_{169}	—	March 27, 2011	Mount Lemmon	Mount Lemmon Survey	·	1.8 km	MPC · JPL
816365	2011 FE_{170}	—	March 28, 2011	Mount Lemmon	Mount Lemmon Survey	·	1.1 km	MPC · JPL
816366	2011 GJ	—	April 1, 2011	Kitt Peak	Spacewatch	·	970 m	MPC · JPL
816367	2011 GX	—	March 17, 2004	Kitt Peak	Spacewatch	·	530 m	MPC · JPL
816368	2011 GY	—	March 11, 2011	Mount Lemmon	Mount Lemmon Survey	·	550 m	MPC · JPL
816369	2011 GO_{2}	—	April 1, 2011	Dauban	C. Rinner, Kugel, F.	·	1.4 km	MPC · JPL
816370	2011 GC_{4}	—	April 1, 2011	Kitt Peak	Spacewatch	·	690 m	MPC · JPL
816371	2011 GQ_{5}	—	April 2, 2011	Mount Lemmon	Mount Lemmon Survey	V	490 m	MPC · JPL
816372	2011 GS_{7}	—	March 11, 2011	Mount Lemmon	Mount Lemmon Survey	·	1.1 km	MPC · JPL
816373	2011 GN_{12}	—	April 1, 2011	Mount Lemmon	Mount Lemmon Survey	·	700 m	MPC · JPL
816374	2011 GC_{13}	—	April 1, 2011	Mount Lemmon	Mount Lemmon Survey	AEO	820 m	MPC · JPL
816375	2011 GR_{21}	—	January 25, 2007	Kitt Peak	Spacewatch	·	810 m	MPC · JPL
816376	2011 GG_{30}	—	April 1, 2011	Kitt Peak	Spacewatch	·	2.4 km	MPC · JPL
816377	2011 GH_{30}	—	April 1, 2011	Kitt Peak	Spacewatch	·	840 m	MPC · JPL
816378	2011 GA_{31}	—	March 2, 2011	Mount Lemmon	Mount Lemmon Survey	·	670 m	MPC · JPL
816379	2011 GS_{32}	—	March 27, 2011	Kitt Peak	Spacewatch	PHO	830 m	MPC · JPL
816380	2011 GW_{32}	—	April 1, 2011	Kitt Peak	Spacewatch	·	570 m	MPC · JPL
816381	2011 GO_{33}	—	April 3, 2011	Haleakala	Pan-STARRS 1	·	2.2 km	MPC · JPL
816382	2011 GA_{39}	—	March 24, 2011	Catalina	CSS	·	930 m	MPC · JPL
816383	2011 GL_{42}	—	April 5, 2011	Catalina	CSS	H	470 m	MPC · JPL
816384	2011 GF_{43}	—	April 4, 2011	Mount Lemmon	Mount Lemmon Survey	AGN	790 m	MPC · JPL
816385	2011 GQ_{43}	—	April 4, 2011	Mount Lemmon	Mount Lemmon Survey	·	2.1 km	MPC · JPL
816386	2011 GY_{44}	—	February 25, 2011	Kitt Peak	Spacewatch	·	760 m	MPC · JPL
816387	2011 GF_{49}	—	April 3, 2011	Haleakala	Pan-STARRS 1	·	710 m	MPC · JPL
816388	2011 GP_{49}	—	December 27, 2006	Mount Lemmon	Mount Lemmon Survey	·	870 m	MPC · JPL
816389	2011 GD_{64}	—	April 11, 2011	Mount Lemmon	Mount Lemmon Survey	·	810 m	MPC · JPL
816390	2011 GY_{68}	—	April 13, 2011	Haleakala	Pan-STARRS 1	H	450 m	MPC · JPL
816391	2011 GJ_{69}	—	April 1, 2011	Kitt Peak	Spacewatch	H	410 m	MPC · JPL
816392	2011 GU_{70}	—	April 6, 2011	Mount Lemmon	Mount Lemmon Survey	PHO	690 m	MPC · JPL
816393	2011 GD_{90}	—	April 3, 2011	Haleakala	Pan-STARRS 1	·	730 m	MPC · JPL
816394	2011 GZ_{90}	—	April 13, 2011	Mount Lemmon	Mount Lemmon Survey	·	850 m	MPC · JPL
816395	2011 GX_{91}	—	March 17, 2015	Mount Lemmon	Mount Lemmon Survey	·	1.0 km	MPC · JPL
816396	2011 GF_{93}	—	October 9, 2012	Mount Lemmon	Mount Lemmon Survey	·	840 m	MPC · JPL
816397	2011 GN_{94}	—	April 9, 2011	Mayhill-ISON	L. Elenin	·	920 m	MPC · JPL
816398	2011 GR_{94}	—	April 11, 2011	Mount Lemmon	Mount Lemmon Survey	PHO	750 m	MPC · JPL
816399	2011 GU_{95}	—	April 2, 2011	Mount Lemmon	Mount Lemmon Survey	·	770 m	MPC · JPL
816400	2011 GZ_{95}	—	October 7, 2016	Haleakala	Pan-STARRS 1	PHO	780 m	MPC · JPL

== 816401–816500 ==
back to top

Designation			Discovery			Properties		Ref
Permanent	Provisional	Named after	Date	Site	Discoverer(s)	Category	Diam.	Ref
816401	2011 GZ_{96}	—	August 25, 2012	Kitt Peak	Spacewatch	·	860 m	MPC · JPL
816402	2011 GK_{97}	—	April 6, 2011	Mount Lemmon	Mount Lemmon Survey	·	1.5 km	MPC · JPL
816403	2011 GG_{100}	—	April 2, 2011	Kitt Peak	Spacewatch	·	560 m	MPC · JPL
816404	2011 GH_{100}	—	April 13, 2011	Mount Lemmon	Mount Lemmon Survey	·	490 m	MPC · JPL
816405	2011 GJ_{101}	—	April 2, 2011	Kitt Peak	Spacewatch	·	1.2 km	MPC · JPL
816406	2011 GA_{102}	—	April 1, 2011	Kitt Peak	Spacewatch	NYS	700 m	MPC · JPL
816407	2011 GM_{102}	—	April 11, 2011	Mount Lemmon	Mount Lemmon Survey	·	610 m	MPC · JPL
816408	2011 GC_{103}	—	April 3, 2011	Haleakala	Pan-STARRS 1	MRX	720 m	MPC · JPL
816409	2011 GD_{103}	—	April 2, 2011	Haleakala	Pan-STARRS 1	·	1.7 km	MPC · JPL
816410	2011 GB_{105}	—	April 6, 2011	Mount Lemmon	Mount Lemmon Survey	·	1.2 km	MPC · JPL
816411	2011 GP_{105}	—	April 2, 2011	Mount Lemmon	Mount Lemmon Survey	·	520 m	MPC · JPL
816412	2011 GA_{107}	—	April 1, 2011	Kitt Peak	Spacewatch	NYS	800 m	MPC · JPL
816413	2011 GF_{107}	—	April 5, 2011	Mount Lemmon	Mount Lemmon Survey	·	840 m	MPC · JPL
816414	2011 GM_{107}	—	April 5, 2011	Kitt Peak	Spacewatch	·	1.5 km	MPC · JPL
816415	2011 GZ_{108}	—	April 6, 2011	Kitt Peak	Spacewatch	·	890 m	MPC · JPL
816416	2011 GN_{111}	—	April 1, 2011	Mount Lemmon	Mount Lemmon Survey	·	1.3 km	MPC · JPL
816417	2011 HB	—	April 21, 2011	Haleakala	Pan-STARRS 1	H	430 m	MPC · JPL
816418	2011 HQ_{8}	—	April 13, 2011	Mount Lemmon	Mount Lemmon Survey	·	1.2 km	MPC · JPL
816419	2011 HR_{8}	—	April 21, 2011	Haleakala	Pan-STARRS 1	·	530 m	MPC · JPL
816420	2011 HE_{9}	—	March 27, 2011	Mount Lemmon	Mount Lemmon Survey	·	2.3 km	MPC · JPL
816421	2011 HH_{9}	—	March 29, 2011	Kitt Peak	Spacewatch	·	1.3 km	MPC · JPL
816422	2011 HM_{12}	—	April 23, 2011	Kitt Peak	Spacewatch	·	910 m	MPC · JPL
816423	2011 HU_{19}	—	April 6, 2011	Kitt Peak	Spacewatch	·	550 m	MPC · JPL
816424	2011 HD_{20}	—	April 26, 2011	Mount Lemmon	Mount Lemmon Survey	·	2.1 km	MPC · JPL
816425	2011 HF_{24}	—	January 30, 2006	Siding Spring	SSS	T_{j} (2.92)	3.1 km	MPC · JPL
816426	2011 HN_{25}	—	April 27, 2011	Haleakala	Pan-STARRS 1	·	710 m	MPC · JPL
816427	2011 HR_{38}	—	April 6, 2011	Mount Lemmon	Mount Lemmon Survey	·	550 m	MPC · JPL
816428	2011 HG_{40}	—	April 26, 2011	Mount Lemmon	Mount Lemmon Survey	·	750 m	MPC · JPL
816429	2011 HM_{42}	—	April 12, 2011	Mount Lemmon	Mount Lemmon Survey	·	1.1 km	MPC · JPL
816430	2011 HY_{48}	—	April 28, 2011	Haleakala	Pan-STARRS 1	·	1.3 km	MPC · JPL
816431	2011 HX_{49}	—	April 11, 2011	Mount Lemmon	Mount Lemmon Survey	·	910 m	MPC · JPL
816432	2011 HJ_{57}	—	April 28, 2011	Kitt Peak	Spacewatch	·	1.1 km	MPC · JPL
816433	2011 HA_{69}	—	March 27, 2011	Kitt Peak	Spacewatch	·	2.6 km	MPC · JPL
816434	2011 HP_{75}	—	April 28, 2011	Kitt Peak	Spacewatch	·	2.6 km	MPC · JPL
816435	2011 HH_{88}	—	September 28, 2008	Mount Lemmon	Mount Lemmon Survey	·	1.1 km	MPC · JPL
816436	2011 HT_{89}	—	March 23, 2003	Sacramento Peak	SDSS	·	910 m	MPC · JPL
816437	2011 HF_{93}	—	December 27, 2006	Mount Lemmon	Mount Lemmon Survey	·	630 m	MPC · JPL
816438	2011 HV_{95}	—	April 24, 2011	Kitt Peak	Spacewatch	·	670 m	MPC · JPL
816439	2011 HH_{99}	—	October 8, 2008	Mount Lemmon	Mount Lemmon Survey	·	1.0 km	MPC · JPL
816440	2011 HU_{99}	—	September 6, 2008	Kitt Peak	Spacewatch	·	700 m	MPC · JPL
816441	2011 HN_{101}	—	April 21, 2011	Haleakala	Pan-STARRS 1	·	640 m	MPC · JPL
816442	2011 HX_{106}	—	April 29, 2011	Mount Lemmon	Mount Lemmon Survey	·	1.2 km	MPC · JPL
816443	2011 HN_{107}	—	October 8, 2012	Kitt Peak	Spacewatch	NYS	760 m	MPC · JPL
816444	2011 HV_{107}	—	October 17, 2012	Haleakala	Pan-STARRS 1	·	780 m	MPC · JPL
816445	2011 HZ_{107}	—	March 18, 2018	Haleakala	Pan-STARRS 1	·	830 m	MPC · JPL
816446	2011 HL_{108}	—	July 9, 2015	Haleakala	Pan-STARRS 1	PHO	600 m	MPC · JPL
816447	2011 HN_{109}	—	August 7, 2016	Haleakala	Pan-STARRS 1	·	790 m	MPC · JPL
816448	2011 HD_{111}	—	April 24, 2011	Kitt Peak	Spacewatch	·	2.5 km	MPC · JPL
816449	2011 HH_{111}	—	April 28, 2011	Haleakala	Pan-STARRS 1	·	510 m	MPC · JPL
816450	2011 HK_{112}	—	April 29, 2011	Mount Lemmon	Mount Lemmon Survey	·	1.1 km	MPC · JPL
816451	2011 JP	—	May 1, 2011	Kitt Peak	Spacewatch	·	1.4 km	MPC · JPL
816452	2011 JL_{2}	—	May 4, 2011	Dauban	C. Rinner, Kugel, F.	PHO	700 m	MPC · JPL
816453	2011 JD_{3}	—	February 25, 2011	Kitt Peak	Spacewatch	·	2.7 km	MPC · JPL
816454	2011 JM_{4}	—	May 1, 2011	Haleakala	Pan-STARRS 1	·	570 m	MPC · JPL
816455	2011 JO_{9}	—	May 7, 2011	Mount Lemmon	Mount Lemmon Survey	(2076)	470 m	MPC · JPL
816456	2011 JN_{22}	—	May 1, 2011	Haleakala	Pan-STARRS 1	·	1.6 km	MPC · JPL
816457	2011 JN_{23}	—	May 1, 2011	Haleakala	Pan-STARRS 1	V	410 m	MPC · JPL
816458	2011 JO_{23}	—	May 1, 2011	Haleakala	Pan-STARRS 1	·	1.2 km	MPC · JPL
816459	2011 JT_{32}	—	May 8, 2011	Kitt Peak	Spacewatch	·	850 m	MPC · JPL
816460	2011 JZ_{32}	—	May 9, 2011	Mount Lemmon	Mount Lemmon Survey	V	560 m	MPC · JPL
816461	2011 JW_{33}	—	March 1, 2016	Haleakala	Pan-STARRS 1	·	2.0 km	MPC · JPL
816462	2011 JF_{35}	—	May 5, 2011	Siding Spring	SSS	·	590 m	MPC · JPL
816463	2011 JU_{35}	—	July 4, 2017	Haleakala	Pan-STARRS 1	H	480 m	MPC · JPL
816464	2011 JZ_{35}	—	May 9, 2011	Mount Lemmon	Mount Lemmon Survey	3:2 · SHU	4.8 km	MPC · JPL
816465	2011 JE_{36}	—	October 8, 2012	Haleakala	Pan-STARRS 1	·	940 m	MPC · JPL
816466	2011 JV_{36}	—	May 14, 2011	Mount Lemmon	Mount Lemmon Survey	·	780 m	MPC · JPL
816467	2011 JJ_{39}	—	May 9, 2011	Mount Lemmon	Mount Lemmon Survey	·	1.1 km	MPC · JPL
816468	2011 KP_{13}	—	May 21, 2011	Haleakala	Pan-STARRS 1	PHO	770 m	MPC · JPL
816469	2011 KH_{14}	—	May 22, 2011	Mount Lemmon	Mount Lemmon Survey	·	600 m	MPC · JPL
816470	2011 KL_{14}	—	February 6, 2007	Mount Lemmon	Mount Lemmon Survey	·	520 m	MPC · JPL
816471	2011 KN_{14}	—	May 23, 2011	Mount Lemmon	Mount Lemmon Survey	·	1.4 km	MPC · JPL
816472	2011 KX_{17}	—	November 26, 2005	Mount Lemmon	Mount Lemmon Survey	·	650 m	MPC · JPL
816473	2011 KC_{20}	—	May 26, 2011	Kitt Peak	Spacewatch	H	400 m	MPC · JPL
816474	2011 KU_{21}	—	August 25, 2001	Socorro	LINEAR	·	620 m	MPC · JPL
816475	2011 KT_{22}	—	May 30, 2011	Haleakala	Pan-STARRS 1	H	430 m	MPC · JPL
816476	2011 KD_{27}	—	May 12, 2011	Mount Lemmon	Mount Lemmon Survey	·	610 m	MPC · JPL
816477	2011 KS_{31}	—	October 2, 2008	Kitt Peak	Spacewatch	·	560 m	MPC · JPL
816478	2011 KH_{36}	—	July 7, 2016	Haleakala	Pan-STARRS 1	·	1.4 km	MPC · JPL
816479	2011 KK_{37}	—	May 21, 2011	Haleakala	Pan-STARRS 1	·	770 m	MPC · JPL
816480	2011 KJ_{38}	—	May 22, 2011	Mount Lemmon	Mount Lemmon Survey	MRX	830 m	MPC · JPL
816481	2011 KW_{38}	—	May 24, 2011	Mount Lemmon	Mount Lemmon Survey	·	1.5 km	MPC · JPL
816482	2011 KS_{43}	—	May 26, 2011	Mount Lemmon	Mount Lemmon Survey	·	1.3 km	MPC · JPL
816483	2011 KD_{49}	—	May 26, 2011	Kitt Peak	Spacewatch	·	1.4 km	MPC · JPL
816484	2011 KN_{49}	—	May 24, 2011	Haleakala	Pan-STARRS 1	V	530 m	MPC · JPL
816485	2011 KJ_{50}	—	October 13, 2017	Mount Lemmon	Mount Lemmon Survey	·	1.4 km	MPC · JPL
816486	2011 KB_{51}	—	October 8, 2012	Mount Lemmon	Mount Lemmon Survey	·	1.6 km	MPC · JPL
816487	2011 KJ_{51}	—	October 22, 2012	Haleakala	Pan-STARRS 1	H	360 m	MPC · JPL
816488	2011 KP_{51}	—	May 26, 2011	Kitt Peak	Spacewatch	TIN	720 m	MPC · JPL
816489	2011 KY_{51}	—	May 29, 2011	Mount Lemmon	Mount Lemmon Survey	·	1.2 km	MPC · JPL
816490	2011 KL_{53}	—	May 26, 2011	Mount Lemmon	Mount Lemmon Survey	·	1.9 km	MPC · JPL
816491	2011 KU_{53}	—	May 24, 2011	Haleakala	Pan-STARRS 1	·	650 m	MPC · JPL
816492	2011 KW_{53}	—	May 29, 2011	Mount Lemmon	Mount Lemmon Survey	·	850 m	MPC · JPL
816493	2011 KV_{54}	—	October 18, 2012	Haleakala	Pan-STARRS 1	·	890 m	MPC · JPL
816494	2011 KV_{58}	—	May 22, 2011	Mount Lemmon	Mount Lemmon Survey	·	1.5 km	MPC · JPL
816495	2011 KW_{58}	—	May 27, 2011	Kitt Peak	Spacewatch	·	1.6 km	MPC · JPL
816496	2011 KL_{59}	—	May 23, 2011	Nogales	M. Schwartz, P. R. Holvorcem	·	800 m	MPC · JPL
816497	2011 LY_{1}	—	June 3, 2011	Mount Lemmon	Mount Lemmon Survey	·	2.2 km	MPC · JPL
816498	2011 LD_{6}	—	June 4, 2011	Mount Lemmon	Mount Lemmon Survey	·	620 m	MPC · JPL
816499	2011 LW_{11}	—	April 22, 2007	Mount Lemmon	Mount Lemmon Survey	·	930 m	MPC · JPL
816500	2011 LO_{13}	—	June 3, 2011	Mount Lemmon	Mount Lemmon Survey	·	2.3 km	MPC · JPL

== 816501–816600 ==
back to top

Designation			Discovery			Properties		Ref
Permanent	Provisional	Named after	Date	Site	Discoverer(s)	Category	Diam.	Ref
816501	2011 LD_{15}	—	June 6, 2011	Haleakala	Pan-STARRS 1	·	1.3 km	MPC · JPL
816502	2011 LD_{19}	—	June 7, 2011	Catalina	CSS	AMO +1km	890 m	MPC · JPL
816503	2011 LX_{21}	—	September 4, 2008	Kitt Peak	Spacewatch	·	830 m	MPC · JPL
816504	2011 LT_{24}	—	June 6, 2011	Haleakala	Pan-STARRS 1	·	680 m	MPC · JPL
816505	2011 LD_{27}	—	June 6, 2011	Mount Lemmon	Mount Lemmon Survey	·	940 m	MPC · JPL
816506	2011 LP_{27}	—	May 24, 2011	Haleakala	Pan-STARRS 1	·	740 m	MPC · JPL
816507	2011 LW_{29}	—	August 26, 2003	Črni Vrh	Mikuž, H.	·	1.2 km	MPC · JPL
816508	2011 LZ_{30}	—	April 23, 2015	Haleakala	Pan-STARRS 1	·	990 m	MPC · JPL
816509	2011 LH_{31}	—	June 11, 2011	Mount Lemmon	Mount Lemmon Survey	·	1.4 km	MPC · JPL
816510	2011 LY_{31}	—	June 5, 2011	Mount Lemmon	Mount Lemmon Survey	·	730 m	MPC · JPL
816511	2011 LT_{32}	—	October 21, 2012	Mount Lemmon	Mount Lemmon Survey	·	1.0 km	MPC · JPL
816512	2011 LU_{32}	—	June 8, 2011	Mount Lemmon	Mount Lemmon Survey	PHO	830 m	MPC · JPL
816513	2011 LQ_{33}	—	April 12, 2015	Haleakala	Pan-STARRS 1	·	1.6 km	MPC · JPL
816514	2011 LC_{34}	—	June 5, 2011	Mount Lemmon	Mount Lemmon Survey	·	1.0 km	MPC · JPL
816515	2011 LL_{35}	—	June 8, 2011	Mount Lemmon	Mount Lemmon Survey	·	1.2 km	MPC · JPL
816516	2011 LM_{35}	—	June 11, 2011	Mount Lemmon	Mount Lemmon Survey	·	610 m	MPC · JPL
816517	2011 LQ_{36}	—	June 3, 2011	Mount Lemmon	Mount Lemmon Survey	·	670 m	MPC · JPL
816518	2011 MP_{2}	—	June 26, 2011	Mount Lemmon	Mount Lemmon Survey	·	1.3 km	MPC · JPL
816519	2011 MR_{11}	—	June 25, 2011	Mount Lemmon	Mount Lemmon Survey	NYS	830 m	MPC · JPL
816520	2011 MK_{12}	—	January 28, 2014	Mount Lemmon	Mount Lemmon Survey	·	740 m	MPC · JPL
816521	2011 MM_{12}	—	June 25, 2011	Mount Lemmon	Mount Lemmon Survey	H	370 m	MPC · JPL
816522	2011 MD_{13}	—	June 25, 2011	Mount Lemmon	Mount Lemmon Survey	NYS	930 m	MPC · JPL
816523	2011 MJ_{13}	—	July 23, 2015	Haleakala	Pan-STARRS 1	·	900 m	MPC · JPL
816524	2011 MQ_{13}	—	September 11, 2015	Haleakala	Pan-STARRS 1	·	660 m	MPC · JPL
816525	2011 MB_{15}	—	June 23, 2011	Mount Lemmon	Mount Lemmon Survey	MAS	650 m	MPC · JPL
816526	2011 NA_{6}	—	July 1, 2011	Kitt Peak	Spacewatch	EOS	1.3 km	MPC · JPL
816527	2011 OT_{3}	—	June 26, 2011	Mount Lemmon	Mount Lemmon Survey	·	920 m	MPC · JPL
816528	2011 OC_{4}	—	August 8, 2007	Socorro	LINEAR	·	830 m	MPC · JPL
816529	2011 ON_{16}	—	July 26, 2011	Haleakala	Pan-STARRS 1	·	1.0 km	MPC · JPL
816530	2011 OC_{17}	—	July 27, 2011	Haleakala	Pan-STARRS 1	·	760 m	MPC · JPL
816531	2011 OZ_{23}	—	July 28, 2011	Haleakala	Pan-STARRS 1	·	1.4 km	MPC · JPL
816532	2011 OH_{24}	—	July 28, 2011	Siding Spring	SSS	·	870 m	MPC · JPL
816533	2011 OS_{25}	—	July 27, 2011	Siding Spring	SSS	·	740 m	MPC · JPL
816534	2011 OE_{32}	—	July 26, 2011	Haleakala	Pan-STARRS 1	·	1.7 km	MPC · JPL
816535	2011 ON_{43}	—	July 31, 2011	Haleakala	Pan-STARRS 1	·	990 m	MPC · JPL
816536	2011 OR_{43}	—	July 31, 2011	Haleakala	Pan-STARRS 1	·	1.1 km	MPC · JPL
816537	2011 OS_{43}	—	February 16, 2010	Mount Lemmon	Mount Lemmon Survey	·	1.1 km	MPC · JPL
816538	2011 OT_{47}	—	September 5, 2007	Mount Lemmon	Mount Lemmon Survey	·	1.1 km	MPC · JPL
816539	2011 OU_{49}	—	June 27, 2011	Mount Lemmon	Mount Lemmon Survey	·	710 m	MPC · JPL
816540	2011 OW_{52}	—	July 26, 2011	Haleakala	Pan-STARRS 1	TIN	860 m	MPC · JPL
816541	2011 OA_{56}	—	July 27, 2011	Haleakala	Pan-STARRS 1	·	920 m	MPC · JPL
816542	2011 OQ_{56}	—	July 27, 2011	Haleakala	Pan-STARRS 1	·	710 m	MPC · JPL
816543	2011 OE_{57}	—	July 27, 2011	Haleakala	Pan-STARRS 1	·	490 m	MPC · JPL
816544	2011 OR_{59}	—	June 27, 2011	Mount Lemmon	Mount Lemmon Survey	·	710 m	MPC · JPL
816545	2011 OT_{61}	—	July 28, 2011	Haleakala	Pan-STARRS 1	TIR	2.3 km	MPC · JPL
816546	2011 OG_{63}	—	August 3, 2016	Haleakala	Pan-STARRS 1	·	1.5 km	MPC · JPL
816547	2011 OH_{63}	—	July 27, 2011	Haleakala	Pan-STARRS 1	·	2.3 km	MPC · JPL
816548	2011 OY_{64}	—	July 27, 2011	Haleakala	Pan-STARRS 1	·	1.5 km	MPC · JPL
816549	2011 OZ_{64}	—	July 28, 2011	Haleakala	Pan-STARRS 1	NYS	750 m	MPC · JPL
816550	2011 OY_{65}	—	August 21, 2015	Haleakala	Pan-STARRS 1	·	1.0 km	MPC · JPL
816551	2011 OB_{66}	—	July 25, 2015	Haleakala	Pan-STARRS 1	·	860 m	MPC · JPL
816552	2011 OF_{67}	—	April 21, 2014	Mount Lemmon	Mount Lemmon Survey	·	630 m	MPC · JPL
816553	2011 OJ_{67}	—	February 18, 2017	Haleakala	Pan-STARRS 1	·	1.2 km	MPC · JPL
816554	2011 OL_{67}	—	July 27, 2011	Haleakala	Pan-STARRS 1	·	760 m	MPC · JPL
816555	2011 OY_{67}	—	January 10, 2013	Haleakala	Pan-STARRS 1	·	900 m	MPC · JPL
816556	2011 OP_{68}	—	December 24, 2016	Haleakala	Pan-STARRS 1	·	790 m	MPC · JPL
816557	2011 OM_{69}	—	January 27, 2017	Haleakala	Pan-STARRS 1	·	930 m	MPC · JPL
816558	2011 OH_{70}	—	July 29, 2011	Siding Spring	SSS	·	1.1 km	MPC · JPL
816559	2011 OJ_{70}	—	July 28, 2011	Haleakala	Pan-STARRS 1	·	1.2 km	MPC · JPL
816560	2011 OM_{70}	—	July 28, 2011	Haleakala	Pan-STARRS 1	·	1.6 km	MPC · JPL
816561	2011 OH_{71}	—	July 27, 2011	Haleakala	Pan-STARRS 1	MAS	630 m	MPC · JPL
816562	2011 OT_{74}	—	July 26, 2011	Haleakala	Pan-STARRS 1	·	420 m	MPC · JPL
816563	2011 OX_{74}	—	July 25, 2011	Haleakala	Pan-STARRS 1	H	410 m	MPC · JPL
816564	2011 OT_{75}	—	July 28, 2011	Haleakala	Pan-STARRS 1	·	480 m	MPC · JPL
816565	2011 OG_{79}	—	July 27, 2011	Haleakala	Pan-STARRS 1	·	1.3 km	MPC · JPL
816566	2011 PZ_{6}	—	July 27, 2011	Haleakala	Pan-STARRS 1	·	520 m	MPC · JPL
816567	2011 PD_{18}	—	January 2, 2013	Mount Lemmon	Mount Lemmon Survey	·	1.7 km	MPC · JPL
816568	2011 PL_{19}	—	December 23, 2012	Haleakala	Pan-STARRS 1	·	1.1 km	MPC · JPL
816569	2011 PP_{19}	—	April 30, 2014	Haleakala	Pan-STARRS 1	·	830 m	MPC · JPL
816570	2011 PW_{19}	—	May 20, 2014	Haleakala	Pan-STARRS 1	PHO	760 m	MPC · JPL
816571	2011 PN_{20}	—	July 9, 2016	Haleakala	Pan-STARRS 1	·	1.6 km	MPC · JPL
816572	2011 PT_{20}	—	August 5, 2011	ESA OGS	ESA OGS	·	780 m	MPC · JPL
816573	2011 PV_{20}	—	September 9, 2015	Haleakala	Pan-STARRS 1	·	800 m	MPC · JPL
816574	2011 PN_{21}	—	August 4, 2011	Haleakala	Pan-STARRS 1	MAS	600 m	MPC · JPL
816575	2011 PV_{22}	—	August 2, 2011	Haleakala	Pan-STARRS 1	·	430 m	MPC · JPL
816576	2011 QS	—	September 3, 2002	Palomar	NEAT	·	2.0 km	MPC · JPL
816577	2011 QS_{10}	—	June 8, 2011	Mount Lemmon	Mount Lemmon Survey	·	570 m	MPC · JPL
816578	2011 QO_{13}	—	August 23, 2011	Socorro	LINEAR	·	930 m	MPC · JPL
816579	2011 QW_{14}	—	August 4, 2011	Siding Spring	SSS	·	1.4 km	MPC · JPL
816580	2011 QW_{16}	—	August 20, 2011	Haleakala	Pan-STARRS 1	·	1.2 km	MPC · JPL
816581	2011 QJ_{19}	—	August 23, 2011	Haleakala	Pan-STARRS 1	NYS	620 m	MPC · JPL
816582	2011 QY_{29}	—	August 24, 2011	Haleakala	Pan-STARRS 1	PHO	790 m	MPC · JPL
816583	2011 QX_{45}	—	August 29, 2011	Haleakala	Pan-STARRS 1	H	430 m	MPC · JPL
816584	2011 QT_{46}	—	August 28, 2011	Haleakala	Pan-STARRS 1	·	600 m	MPC · JPL
816585	2011 QF_{52}	—	August 22, 2011	La Sagra	OAM	NYS	970 m	MPC · JPL
816586	2011 QC_{56}	—	August 28, 2011	Haleakala	Pan-STARRS 1	·	1.2 km	MPC · JPL
816587	2011 QE_{57}	—	May 30, 2003	Cerro Tololo	Deep Ecliptic Survey	·	580 m	MPC · JPL
816588	2011 QF_{57}	—	August 29, 2011	Mayhill-ISON	L. Elenin	·	530 m	MPC · JPL
816589	2011 QS_{58}	—	December 30, 2008	Mount Lemmon	Mount Lemmon Survey	·	750 m	MPC · JPL
816590	2011 QV_{58}	—	August 28, 2011	Haleakala	Pan-STARRS 1	·	700 m	MPC · JPL
816591	2011 QO_{59}	—	October 8, 2004	Kitt Peak	Spacewatch	NYS	700 m	MPC · JPL
816592	2011 QX_{73}	—	August 20, 2011	Haleakala	Pan-STARRS 1	H	410 m	MPC · JPL
816593	2011 QG_{76}	—	January 15, 2009	Kitt Peak	Spacewatch	·	750 m	MPC · JPL
816594	2011 QR_{76}	—	August 23, 2011	Haleakala	Pan-STARRS 1	·	730 m	MPC · JPL
816595	2011 QZ_{79}	—	August 23, 2011	Haleakala	Pan-STARRS 1	MAS	600 m	MPC · JPL
816596	2011 QD_{88}	—	August 27, 2011	Haleakala	Pan-STARRS 1	·	830 m	MPC · JPL
816597	2011 QX_{91}	—	September 11, 2002	Palomar	NEAT	·	1.3 km	MPC · JPL
816598	2011 QM_{94}	—	July 24, 2000	Kitt Peak	Spacewatch	·	680 m	MPC · JPL
816599	2011 QG_{101}	—	August 3, 2017	Haleakala	Pan-STARRS 1	·	2.4 km	MPC · JPL
816600	2011 QA_{102}	—	August 31, 2011	Haleakala	Pan-STARRS 1	·	640 m	MPC · JPL

== 816601–816700 ==
back to top

Designation			Discovery			Properties		Ref
Permanent	Provisional	Named after	Date	Site	Discoverer(s)	Category	Diam.	Ref
816601	2011 QK_{102}	—	August 24, 2011	Haleakala	Pan-STARRS 1	NYS	970 m	MPC · JPL
816602	2011 QV_{103}	—	August 30, 2011	Haleakala	Pan-STARRS 1	·	2.6 km	MPC · JPL
816603	2011 QD_{104}	—	August 27, 2011	Haleakala	Pan-STARRS 1	·	990 m	MPC · JPL
816604	2011 QW_{104}	—	August 31, 2011	Haleakala	Pan-STARRS 1	·	760 m	MPC · JPL
816605	2011 QD_{105}	—	August 30, 2011	Haleakala	Pan-STARRS 1	·	760 m	MPC · JPL
816606	2011 QF_{105}	—	August 28, 2003	Palomar	NEAT	T_{j} (2.93)	3.9 km	MPC · JPL
816607	2011 QQ_{105}	—	September 11, 2015	Haleakala	Pan-STARRS 1	·	870 m	MPC · JPL
816608	2011 QF_{106}	—	August 27, 2011	Haleakala	Pan-STARRS 1	·	980 m	MPC · JPL
816609	2011 QQ_{106}	—	December 26, 2017	Haleakala	Pan-STARRS 1	H	390 m	MPC · JPL
816610	2011 QX_{108}	—	August 30, 2011	Haleakala	Pan-STARRS 1	615	1.1 km	MPC · JPL
816611	2011 QM_{109}	—	August 31, 2011	Haleakala	Pan-STARRS 1	·	930 m	MPC · JPL
816612	2011 QW_{111}	—	August 30, 2011	Haleakala	Pan-STARRS 1	·	1.6 km	MPC · JPL
816613	2011 QM_{113}	—	August 20, 2011	Haleakala	Pan-STARRS 1	·	1.1 km	MPC · JPL
816614	2011 QK_{115}	—	August 27, 2011	Haleakala	Pan-STARRS 1	·	1.5 km	MPC · JPL
816615	2011 QK_{117}	—	August 27, 2011	Mayhill-ISON	L. Elenin	·	850 m	MPC · JPL
816616	2011 QW_{118}	—	August 24, 2011	Haleakala	Pan-STARRS 1	·	770 m	MPC · JPL
816617	2011 RX_{4}	—	September 5, 2011	Haleakala	Pan-STARRS 1	KON	1.7 km	MPC · JPL
816618	2011 RA_{5}	—	September 14, 2007	Mount Lemmon	Mount Lemmon Survey	·	1.6 km	MPC · JPL
816619	2011 RH_{6}	—	September 5, 2011	Haleakala	Pan-STARRS 1	ERI	930 m	MPC · JPL
816620	2011 RT_{7}	—	September 26, 2003	Sacramento Peak	SDSS	3:2	4.1 km	MPC · JPL
816621	2011 RF_{10}	—	August 20, 2011	Haleakala	Pan-STARRS 1	·	920 m	MPC · JPL
816622	2011 RX_{20}	—	September 2, 2011	Haleakala	Pan-STARRS 1	AEO	840 m	MPC · JPL
816623	2011 RN_{23}	—	September 4, 2011	Haleakala	Pan-STARRS 1	NYS	770 m	MPC · JPL
816624	2011 RN_{25}	—	January 16, 2013	Haleakala	Pan-STARRS 1	·	760 m	MPC · JPL
816625	2011 RD_{26}	—	September 4, 2011	Haleakala	Pan-STARRS 1	·	670 m	MPC · JPL
816626	2011 RL_{32}	—	April 10, 2010	Mount Lemmon	Mount Lemmon Survey	·	1.9 km	MPC · JPL
816627	2011 RW_{33}	—	September 8, 2011	Kitt Peak	Spacewatch	·	680 m	MPC · JPL
816628	2011 RA_{34}	—	September 4, 2011	Haleakala	Pan-STARRS 1	·	2.1 km	MPC · JPL
816629	2011 RT_{34}	—	September 4, 2011	Haleakala	Pan-STARRS 1	·	1.6 km	MPC · JPL
816630	2011 RY_{34}	—	September 7, 2011	Westfield	International Astronomical Search Collaboration	·	1.2 km	MPC · JPL
816631	2011 SR	—	September 2, 2011	Haleakala	Pan-STARRS 1	NYS	740 m	MPC · JPL
816632	2011 SG_{17}	—	September 19, 2011	Mount Lemmon	Mount Lemmon Survey	·	820 m	MPC · JPL
816633	2011 SS_{20}	—	October 7, 2004	Palomar	NEAT	·	870 m	MPC · JPL
816634	2011 ST_{22}	—	September 18, 2011	Mount Lemmon	Mount Lemmon Survey	·	990 m	MPC · JPL
816635	2011 SV_{25}	—	November 11, 2004	Kitt Peak	Spacewatch	·	780 m	MPC · JPL
816636	2011 SP_{29}	—	September 20, 2011	Haleakala	Pan-STARRS 1	·	810 m	MPC · JPL
816637	2011 SS_{30}	—	August 23, 2011	Haleakala	Pan-STARRS 1	·	690 m	MPC · JPL
816638	2011 SR_{34}	—	September 20, 2011	Kitt Peak	Spacewatch	NYS	910 m	MPC · JPL
816639	2011 SH_{36}	—	September 20, 2011	Kitt Peak	Spacewatch	·	580 m	MPC · JPL
816640	2011 ST_{36}	—	September 20, 2011	Kitt Peak	Spacewatch	·	450 m	MPC · JPL
816641	2011 SN_{39}	—	August 30, 2011	Haleakala	Pan-STARRS 1	·	1.7 km	MPC · JPL
816642	2011 SJ_{43}	—	September 18, 2011	Mount Lemmon	Mount Lemmon Survey	·	1.3 km	MPC · JPL
816643	2011 SK_{46}	—	September 2, 2011	Haleakala	Pan-STARRS 1	·	930 m	MPC · JPL
816644	2011 SL_{47}	—	March 14, 2010	Mount Lemmon	Mount Lemmon Survey	·	1.4 km	MPC · JPL
816645	2011 SU_{48}	—	October 4, 2004	Kitt Peak	Spacewatch	·	540 m	MPC · JPL
816646	2011 SG_{51}	—	September 22, 2011	Kitt Peak	Spacewatch	NYS	810 m	MPC · JPL
816647	2011 SC_{53}	—	September 4, 2011	Haleakala	Pan-STARRS 1	·	530 m	MPC · JPL
816648	2011 SB_{59}	—	September 18, 2011	Mount Lemmon	Mount Lemmon Survey	AEO	780 m	MPC · JPL
816649	2011 ST_{71}	—	September 24, 2011	Catalina	CSS	·	1.7 km	MPC · JPL
816650	2011 SX_{81}	—	September 20, 2011	Mount Lemmon	Mount Lemmon Survey	·	1.1 km	MPC · JPL
816651	2011 SL_{82}	—	September 20, 2011	Mount Lemmon	Mount Lemmon Survey	·	710 m	MPC · JPL
816652	2011 SZ_{87}	—	September 22, 2011	Kitt Peak	Spacewatch	·	480 m	MPC · JPL
816653	2011 SF_{90}	—	September 22, 2011	Kitt Peak	Spacewatch	AEO	1.1 km	MPC · JPL
816654	2011 SC_{95}	—	September 24, 2011	Mount Lemmon	Mount Lemmon Survey	·	770 m	MPC · JPL
816655	2011 SR_{96}	—	October 9, 2004	Kitt Peak	Spacewatch	·	620 m	MPC · JPL
816656	2011 SC_{99}	—	September 23, 2011	Mount Lemmon	Mount Lemmon Survey	·	1.8 km	MPC · JPL
816657	2011 SL_{101}	—	September 24, 2011	Mount Lemmon	Mount Lemmon Survey	·	1.6 km	MPC · JPL
816658	2011 SB_{104}	—	September 23, 2011	Kitt Peak	Spacewatch	·	1.3 km	MPC · JPL
816659	2011 SQ_{105}	—	September 23, 2011	Kitt Peak	Spacewatch	·	730 m	MPC · JPL
816660	2011 SL_{107}	—	September 9, 2011	Kitt Peak	Spacewatch	H	410 m	MPC · JPL
816661	2011 SP_{110}	—	August 29, 2011	La Sagra	OAM	·	1.7 km	MPC · JPL
816662	2011 SZ_{118}	—	September 21, 2011	Sandlot	G. Hug	·	1.2 km	MPC · JPL
816663	2011 SL_{125}	—	September 20, 2011	Kitt Peak	Spacewatch	·	910 m	MPC · JPL
816664	2011 SU_{127}	—	September 23, 2011	Haleakala	Pan-STARRS 1	MIS	1.7 km	MPC · JPL
816665	2011 SE_{130}	—	September 23, 2011	Haleakala	Pan-STARRS 1	·	1.5 km	MPC · JPL
816666	2011 SB_{131}	—	September 23, 2011	Haleakala	Pan-STARRS 1	MRX	770 m	MPC · JPL
816667	2011 SW_{135}	—	September 21, 2011	Kitt Peak	Spacewatch	·	1.3 km	MPC · JPL
816668	2011 SD_{136}	—	September 22, 2011	Kitt Peak	Spacewatch	·	860 m	MPC · JPL
816669	2011 SF_{136}	—	September 4, 2011	Haleakala	Pan-STARRS 1	·	1.5 km	MPC · JPL
816670	2011 SM_{136}	—	September 23, 2011	Kitt Peak	Spacewatch	NYS	680 m	MPC · JPL
816671	2011 SV_{136}	—	September 23, 2011	Kitt Peak	Spacewatch	·	2.2 km	MPC · JPL
816672	2011 ST_{139}	—	September 21, 2011	Kitt Peak	Spacewatch	3:2	3.8 km	MPC · JPL
816673	2011 SX_{143}	—	August 31, 2005	Kitt Peak	Spacewatch	HYG	2.0 km	MPC · JPL
816674	2011 SZ_{143}	—	September 18, 2011	Mount Lemmon	Mount Lemmon Survey	T_{j} (2.98) · 3:2	3.5 km	MPC · JPL
816675	2011 SE_{152}	—	September 26, 2011	Haleakala	Pan-STARRS 1	·	1.8 km	MPC · JPL
816676	2011 SZ_{155}	—	September 27, 2003	Kitt Peak	Spacewatch	·	620 m	MPC · JPL
816677	2011 SM_{160}	—	September 23, 2011	Kitt Peak	Spacewatch	·	1.6 km	MPC · JPL
816678	2011 SE_{167}	—	June 9, 2011	Mount Lemmon	Mount Lemmon Survey	·	1.5 km	MPC · JPL
816679	2011 SN_{169}	—	February 22, 2009	Kitt Peak	Spacewatch	NYS	780 m	MPC · JPL
816680	2011 SA_{170}	—	October 1, 2000	Kitt Peak	Spacewatch	·	700 m	MPC · JPL
816681	2011 SM_{170}	—	August 10, 2007	Kitt Peak	Spacewatch	·	920 m	MPC · JPL
816682	2011 SC_{173}	—	September 24, 2011	Haleakala	Pan-STARRS 1	H	370 m	MPC · JPL
816683	2011 SZ_{176}	—	September 23, 2011	Kitt Peak	Spacewatch	·	900 m	MPC · JPL
816684	2011 SM_{183}	—	September 26, 2011	Kitt Peak	Spacewatch	NYS	740 m	MPC · JPL
816685	2011 SF_{185}	—	September 26, 2011	Kitt Peak	Spacewatch	T_{j} (2.98) · 3:2	4.6 km	MPC · JPL
816686	2011 SF_{189}	—	September 29, 2011	Kitt Peak	Spacewatch	·	820 m	MPC · JPL
816687	2011 SN_{190}	—	September 29, 2011	Mount Lemmon	Mount Lemmon Survey	·	900 m	MPC · JPL
816688	2011 SC_{191}	—	April 5, 2003	Kitt Peak	Spacewatch	·	370 m	MPC · JPL
816689	2011 SF_{193}	—	July 3, 2011	Mount Lemmon	Mount Lemmon Survey	3:2 · SHU	4.4 km	MPC · JPL
816690	2011 SN_{193}	—	September 26, 2011	Haleakala	Pan-STARRS 1	·	780 m	MPC · JPL
816691	2011 SZ_{195}	—	February 16, 2010	Kitt Peak	Spacewatch	·	1.1 km	MPC · JPL
816692	2011 SC_{198}	—	October 6, 2004	Kitt Peak	Spacewatch	·	690 m	MPC · JPL
816693	2011 SO_{200}	—	October 9, 2004	Kitt Peak	Spacewatch	·	760 m	MPC · JPL
816694	2011 SM_{210}	—	August 23, 2011	Haleakala	Pan-STARRS 1	MAS	570 m	MPC · JPL
816695	2011 SU_{210}	—	September 21, 2011	Mount Lemmon	Mount Lemmon Survey	MAS	580 m	MPC · JPL
816696	2011 SV_{221}	—	November 10, 2004	Kitt Peak	Spacewatch	NYS	750 m	MPC · JPL
816697	2011 SN_{229}	—	September 29, 2011	Westfield	R. Holmes, T. Vorobjov	H	360 m	MPC · JPL
816698	2011 SG_{234}	—	September 29, 2011	Mount Lemmon	Mount Lemmon Survey	AEO	910 m	MPC · JPL
816699	2011 SD_{236}	—	September 30, 2011	Kitt Peak	Spacewatch	·	820 m	MPC · JPL
816700	2011 SY_{241}	—	September 26, 2011	Mount Lemmon	Mount Lemmon Survey	·	700 m	MPC · JPL

== 816701–816800 ==
back to top

Designation			Discovery			Properties		Ref
Permanent	Provisional	Named after	Date	Site	Discoverer(s)	Category	Diam.	Ref
816701	2011 SD_{246}	—	August 16, 2006	Palomar	NEAT	·	1.4 km	MPC · JPL
816702	2011 SZ_{246}	—	September 29, 2011	Mount Lemmon	Mount Lemmon Survey	V	380 m	MPC · JPL
816703	2011 SJ_{251}	—	September 26, 2011	ESA OGS	ESA OGS	·	1.3 km	MPC · JPL
816704	2011 SL_{254}	—	September 20, 2011	Kitt Peak	Spacewatch	MAS	530 m	MPC · JPL
816705	2011 SU_{255}	—	September 20, 2011	Kitt Peak	Spacewatch	KON	1.5 km	MPC · JPL
816706	2011 SV_{257}	—	September 20, 2011	Kitt Peak	Spacewatch	·	760 m	MPC · JPL
816707	2011 SD_{262}	—	August 27, 2011	Haleakala	Pan-STARRS 1	NYS	930 m	MPC · JPL
816708	2011 SG_{266}	—	August 24, 2011	Westfield	International Astronomical Search Collaboration	PHO	680 m	MPC · JPL
816709	2011 SV_{274}	—	September 4, 2011	Haleakala	Pan-STARRS 1	615	1.1 km	MPC · JPL
816710	2011 SP_{275}	—	September 4, 2011	Haleakala	Pan-STARRS 1	·	850 m	MPC · JPL
816711	2011 SN_{277}	—	April 30, 2014	Haleakala	Pan-STARRS 1	·	1.0 km	MPC · JPL
816712	2011 SA_{279}	—	September 18, 2011	Mount Lemmon	Mount Lemmon Survey	ADE	1.2 km	MPC · JPL
816713	2011 SW_{279}	—	September 24, 2011	Haleakala	Pan-STARRS 1	EOS	1.4 km	MPC · JPL
816714	2011 SU_{283}	—	August 3, 2016	Haleakala	Pan-STARRS 1	·	1.7 km	MPC · JPL
816715	2011 SB_{287}	—	November 10, 2015	Mount Lemmon	Mount Lemmon Survey	·	1.1 km	MPC · JPL
816716	2011 SO_{287}	—	September 18, 2011	Mount Lemmon	Mount Lemmon Survey	PHO	640 m	MPC · JPL
816717	2011 SR_{287}	—	September 26, 2011	Haleakala	Pan-STARRS 1	NYS	880 m	MPC · JPL
816718	2011 ST_{289}	—	September 20, 2011	Haleakala	Pan-STARRS 1	·	830 m	MPC · JPL
816719	2011 SB_{290}	—	September 27, 2011	Bergisch Gladbach	W. Bickel	·	1.1 km	MPC · JPL
816720	2011 SM_{291}	—	September 29, 2011	Kitt Peak	Spacewatch	·	1.1 km	MPC · JPL
816721	2011 SS_{291}	—	April 18, 2015	Haleakala	Pan-STARRS 1	·	1.2 km	MPC · JPL
816722	2011 SB_{292}	—	September 23, 2011	Kitt Peak	Spacewatch	·	2.2 km	MPC · JPL
816723	2011 SF_{292}	—	September 23, 2011	Haleakala	Pan-STARRS 1	MAS	530 m	MPC · JPL
816724	2011 SC_{294}	—	September 19, 2011	Mount Lemmon	Mount Lemmon Survey	·	1.1 km	MPC · JPL
816725	2011 SK_{296}	—	April 5, 2014	Haleakala	Pan-STARRS 1	·	960 m	MPC · JPL
816726	2011 SH_{297}	—	April 1, 2016	Haleakala	Pan-STARRS 1	·	880 m	MPC · JPL
816727	2011 SQ_{297}	—	September 18, 2015	Mount Lemmon	Mount Lemmon Survey	·	860 m	MPC · JPL
816728	2011 SJ_{298}	—	September 18, 2011	Mount Lemmon	Mount Lemmon Survey	·	760 m	MPC · JPL
816729	2011 SZ_{298}	—	September 24, 2011	Haleakala	Pan-STARRS 1	V	490 m	MPC · JPL
816730	2011 SH_{299}	—	September 26, 2011	Haleakala	Pan-STARRS 1	·	1.7 km	MPC · JPL
816731	2011 SF_{300}	—	September 24, 2011	Haleakala	Pan-STARRS 1	·	870 m	MPC · JPL
816732	2011 SR_{300}	—	September 26, 2011	Haleakala	Pan-STARRS 1	·	2.1 km	MPC · JPL
816733	2011 SM_{301}	—	September 28, 2011	Mount Lemmon	Mount Lemmon Survey	·	760 m	MPC · JPL
816734	2011 SR_{309}	—	September 18, 2011	Mount Lemmon	Mount Lemmon Survey	·	550 m	MPC · JPL
816735	2011 SD_{311}	—	September 18, 2011	Mount Lemmon	Mount Lemmon Survey	·	1.5 km	MPC · JPL
816736	2011 SL_{312}	—	September 29, 2011	Mount Lemmon	Mount Lemmon Survey	·	1.8 km	MPC · JPL
816737	2011 SW_{313}	—	September 24, 2011	Haleakala	Pan-STARRS 1	·	1.4 km	MPC · JPL
816738	2011 SQ_{314}	—	September 23, 2011	Mount Lemmon	Mount Lemmon Survey	·	800 m	MPC · JPL
816739	2011 SX_{314}	—	September 24, 2011	Haleakala	Pan-STARRS 1	GEF	960 m	MPC · JPL
816740	2011 SF_{315}	—	September 24, 2011	Mount Lemmon	Mount Lemmon Survey	·	810 m	MPC · JPL
816741	2011 SN_{316}	—	September 29, 2011	Mount Lemmon	Mount Lemmon Survey	·	2.3 km	MPC · JPL
816742	2011 ST_{320}	—	September 18, 2011	Mount Lemmon	Mount Lemmon Survey	·	760 m	MPC · JPL
816743	2011 SD_{324}	—	September 19, 2011	Mount Lemmon	Mount Lemmon Survey	·	1.1 km	MPC · JPL
816744	2011 SV_{324}	—	September 29, 2011	Mount Lemmon	Mount Lemmon Survey	·	1.2 km	MPC · JPL
816745	2011 SQ_{326}	—	September 25, 2011	Haleakala	Pan-STARRS 1	·	1.5 km	MPC · JPL
816746	2011 SC_{328}	—	September 22, 2011	Catalina	CSS	·	1.4 km	MPC · JPL
816747	2011 SA_{329}	—	September 23, 2011	Mount Lemmon	Mount Lemmon Survey	PHO	590 m	MPC · JPL
816748	2011 SG_{330}	—	September 24, 2011	Haleakala	Pan-STARRS 1	·	770 m	MPC · JPL
816749	2011 SS_{330}	—	September 19, 2011	Mount Lemmon	Mount Lemmon Survey	·	2.0 km	MPC · JPL
816750	2011 SN_{335}	—	September 21, 2011	Mount Lemmon	Mount Lemmon Survey	·	610 m	MPC · JPL
816751	2011 SR_{335}	—	September 20, 2011	Mount Lemmon	Mount Lemmon Survey	·	580 m	MPC · JPL
816752	2011 SV_{338}	—	September 19, 2011	Haleakala	Pan-STARRS 1	·	760 m	MPC · JPL
816753	2011 SA_{343}	—	September 19, 2011	Haleakala	Pan-STARRS 1	·	570 m	MPC · JPL
816754	2011 SE_{346}	—	September 20, 2011	Haleakala	Pan-STARRS 1	·	2.4 km	MPC · JPL
816755	2011 SR_{346}	—	September 29, 2011	Mount Lemmon	Mount Lemmon Survey	EOS	1.4 km	MPC · JPL
816756	2011 SW_{346}	—	September 21, 2011	Catalina	CSS	·	750 m	MPC · JPL
816757	2011 SN_{350}	—	September 23, 2011	Haleakala	Pan-STARRS 1	·	960 m	MPC · JPL
816758	2011 SY_{355}	—	September 26, 2011	Mount Lemmon	Mount Lemmon Survey	·	650 m	MPC · JPL
816759	2011 SG_{365}	—	September 22, 2011	Kitt Peak	Spacewatch	·	650 m	MPC · JPL
816760	2011 TN	—	May 30, 2002	Anderson Mesa	LONEOS	·	1.2 km	MPC · JPL
816761	2011 TL_{3}	—	October 3, 2011	Piszkéstető	K. Sárneczky	·	940 m	MPC · JPL
816762	2011 TF_{8}	—	November 20, 2004	Kitt Peak	Spacewatch	·	790 m	MPC · JPL
816763	2011 TQ_{9}	—	October 13, 2004	Vail	Observatory, Jarnac	·	830 m	MPC · JPL
816764	2011 TN_{10}	—	September 8, 2011	Kitt Peak	Spacewatch	THM	1.5 km	MPC · JPL
816765	2011 TQ_{15}	—	September 23, 2011	Haleakala	Pan-STARRS 1	·	900 m	MPC · JPL
816766	2011 TP_{18}	—	October 1, 2011	Mount Lemmon	Mount Lemmon Survey	EOS	1.5 km	MPC · JPL
816767	2011 TV_{18}	—	September 9, 2011	Kitt Peak	Spacewatch	·	1.3 km	MPC · JPL
816768	2011 TZ_{19}	—	January 4, 2017	Haleakala	Pan-STARRS 1	·	930 m	MPC · JPL
816769	2011 TX_{20}	—	October 1, 2011	Mount Lemmon	Mount Lemmon Survey	MAS	510 m	MPC · JPL
816770	2011 UJ_{5}	—	September 22, 2011	Kitt Peak	Spacewatch	·	550 m	MPC · JPL
816771	2011 UW_{9}	—	October 18, 2011	Mount Lemmon	Mount Lemmon Survey	·	940 m	MPC · JPL
816772	2011 UT_{36}	—	October 19, 2011	Mount Lemmon	Mount Lemmon Survey	MAS	590 m	MPC · JPL
816773	2011 UH_{39}	—	September 23, 2011	Kitt Peak	Spacewatch	·	1.0 km	MPC · JPL
816774	2011 US_{39}	—	September 28, 2011	Mount Lemmon	Mount Lemmon Survey	NYS	760 m	MPC · JPL
816775	2011 UW_{40}	—	September 28, 2011	Mount Lemmon	Mount Lemmon Survey	NYS	800 m	MPC · JPL
816776	2011 UG_{46}	—	October 18, 2011	Kitt Peak	Spacewatch	TIR	2.3 km	MPC · JPL
816777	2011 UK_{46}	—	September 29, 2011	Les Engarouines	L. Bernasconi	GEF	1.0 km	MPC · JPL
816778	2011 UG_{49}	—	October 31, 2006	Mount Lemmon	Mount Lemmon Survey	·	1.5 km	MPC · JPL
816779	2011 UB_{51}	—	October 18, 2011	Kitt Peak	Spacewatch	·	1.8 km	MPC · JPL
816780	2011 UK_{51}	—	October 18, 2011	Kitt Peak	Spacewatch	·	1.1 km	MPC · JPL
816781	2011 UW_{57}	—	August 23, 2007	Kitt Peak	Spacewatch	·	810 m	MPC · JPL
816782	2011 UJ_{58}	—	November 3, 2007	Mount Lemmon	Mount Lemmon Survey	·	1.1 km	MPC · JPL
816783	2011 UL_{58}	—	January 25, 2009	Kitt Peak	Spacewatch	MAS	510 m	MPC · JPL
816784	2011 UF_{59}	—	September 5, 2011	Sandlot	G. Hug	·	1.0 km	MPC · JPL
816785	2011 US_{62}	—	October 20, 2011	Haleakala	Pan-STARRS 1	H	370 m	MPC · JPL
816786	2011 UF_{66}	—	January 12, 2008	Kitt Peak	Spacewatch	·	1.3 km	MPC · JPL
816787	2011 UF_{67}	—	October 20, 2011	Mount Lemmon	Mount Lemmon Survey	·	750 m	MPC · JPL
816788	2011 UO_{69}	—	September 27, 2011	Mount Lemmon	Mount Lemmon Survey	·	1.4 km	MPC · JPL
816789	2011 UY_{73}	—	November 2, 2000	Socorro	LINEAR	H	560 m	MPC · JPL
816790	2011 UJ_{75}	—	October 19, 2011	Kitt Peak	Spacewatch	·	650 m	MPC · JPL
816791	2011 UA_{79}	—	October 1, 2000	Socorro	LINEAR	PHO	810 m	MPC · JPL
816792	2011 UC_{81}	—	March 2, 2009	Mount Lemmon	Mount Lemmon Survey	·	1.6 km	MPC · JPL
816793	2011 UG_{85}	—	August 13, 2006	Palomar	NEAT	·	1.7 km	MPC · JPL
816794	2011 UV_{99}	—	November 2, 2007	Kitt Peak	Spacewatch	RAF	630 m	MPC · JPL
816795	2011 UW_{103}	—	October 20, 2011	Mount Lemmon	Mount Lemmon Survey	·	570 m	MPC · JPL
816796	2011 UD_{105}	—	February 9, 2008	Mount Lemmon	Mount Lemmon Survey	·	1.4 km	MPC · JPL
816797	2011 UY_{106}	—	October 23, 2011	Haleakala	Pan-STARRS 1	H	480 m	MPC · JPL
816798	2011 UA_{107}	—	September 20, 1998	Kitt Peak	Spacewatch	·	980 m	MPC · JPL
816799	2011 UL_{110}	—	October 21, 2011	Mount Lemmon	Mount Lemmon Survey	EOS	1.5 km	MPC · JPL
816800	2011 UP_{116}	—	September 11, 2002	Palomar	NEAT	·	1.1 km	MPC · JPL

== 816801–816900 ==
back to top

Designation			Discovery			Properties		Ref
Permanent	Provisional	Named after	Date	Site	Discoverer(s)	Category	Diam.	Ref
816801	2011 UV_{118}	—	October 18, 2011	Mount Lemmon	Mount Lemmon Survey	·	1.5 km	MPC · JPL
816802	2011 UY_{126}	—	October 20, 2011	Kitt Peak	Spacewatch	NYS	860 m	MPC · JPL
816803	2011 UP_{130}	—	September 24, 2011	Catalina	CSS	H	420 m	MPC · JPL
816804	2011 UA_{138}	—	October 21, 2011	Mount Lemmon	Mount Lemmon Survey	·	600 m	MPC · JPL
816805	2011 UC_{139}	—	September 11, 2007	Kitt Peak	Spacewatch	NYS	790 m	MPC · JPL
816806	2011 UK_{145}	—	October 24, 2011	Kitt Peak	Spacewatch	·	1.1 km	MPC · JPL
816807	2011 UP_{145}	—	October 4, 2007	Mount Lemmon	Mount Lemmon Survey	NYS	820 m	MPC · JPL
816808	2011 UA_{149}	—	October 22, 2011	Kitt Peak	Spacewatch	·	2.0 km	MPC · JPL
816809	2011 UP_{149}	—	September 23, 2011	Mount Lemmon	Mount Lemmon Survey	TIR	2.2 km	MPC · JPL
816810	2011 UY_{150}	—	September 26, 2011	Haleakala	Pan-STARRS 1	·	1.4 km	MPC · JPL
816811	2011 UN_{152}	—	October 20, 2011	Mount Lemmon	Mount Lemmon Survey	·	2.8 km	MPC · JPL
816812	2011 UZ_{152}	—	October 21, 2011	Mount Lemmon	Mount Lemmon Survey	·	2.5 km	MPC · JPL
816813	2011 UO_{158}	—	October 25, 2011	Haleakala	Pan-STARRS 1	·	2.1 km	MPC · JPL
816814	2011 UK_{165}	—	October 26, 2011	Haleakala	Pan-STARRS 1	·	630 m	MPC · JPL
816815	2011 UQ_{167}	—	September 26, 2011	Kitt Peak	Spacewatch	NYS	850 m	MPC · JPL
816816	2011 UZ_{171}	—	October 21, 2011	Haleakala	Pan-STARRS 1	·	1.2 km	MPC · JPL
816817	2011 UF_{176}	—	February 18, 2002	Cerro Tololo	Deep Lens Survey	·	1.7 km	MPC · JPL
816818	2011 UZ_{176}	—	October 24, 2011	Kitt Peak	Spacewatch	·	1.8 km	MPC · JPL
816819	2011 UL_{177}	—	September 29, 2011	Mount Lemmon	Mount Lemmon Survey	·	850 m	MPC · JPL
816820	2011 UW_{181}	—	October 24, 2011	Haleakala	Pan-STARRS 1	H	330 m	MPC · JPL
816821	2011 UJ_{183}	—	October 21, 2011	Mount Lemmon	Mount Lemmon Survey	·	2.5 km	MPC · JPL
816822	2011 UZ_{188}	—	December 25, 2005	Kitt Peak	Spacewatch	·	520 m	MPC · JPL
816823	2011 UT_{189}	—	October 27, 2011	Mount Lemmon	Mount Lemmon Survey	·	870 m	MPC · JPL
816824	2011 UL_{192}	—	September 30, 2011	Kitt Peak	Spacewatch	HYG	1.9 km	MPC · JPL
816825	2011 UE_{202}	—	November 9, 2007	Kitt Peak	Spacewatch	·	750 m	MPC · JPL
816826	2011 UH_{209}	—	September 30, 2011	Kitt Peak	Spacewatch	·	820 m	MPC · JPL
816827	2011 UF_{212}	—	October 24, 2011	Mount Lemmon	Mount Lemmon Survey	·	2.2 km	MPC · JPL
816828	2011 UO_{213}	—	October 24, 2011	Mount Lemmon	Mount Lemmon Survey	·	1.2 km	MPC · JPL
816829	2011 UB_{215}	—	October 24, 2011	Mount Lemmon	Mount Lemmon Survey	·	1.1 km	MPC · JPL
816830	2011 UZ_{215}	—	November 11, 2006	Mount Lemmon	Mount Lemmon Survey	EOS	1.0 km	MPC · JPL
816831	2011 UU_{217}	—	August 29, 2006	Kitt Peak	Spacewatch	·	1.6 km	MPC · JPL
816832	2011 UW_{220}	—	September 29, 2011	Kitt Peak	Spacewatch	THM	1.8 km	MPC · JPL
816833	2011 UQ_{232}	—	October 30, 2007	Mount Lemmon	Mount Lemmon Survey	·	940 m	MPC · JPL
816834	2011 UN_{242}	—	October 25, 2011	Haleakala	Pan-STARRS 1	·	420 m	MPC · JPL
816835	2011 UF_{243}	—	September 24, 2011	Mount Lemmon	Mount Lemmon Survey	·	1.6 km	MPC · JPL
816836	2011 UA_{245}	—	October 22, 2011	Kitt Peak	Spacewatch	·	770 m	MPC · JPL
816837	2011 UQ_{245}	—	October 26, 2011	Kitt Peak	Spacewatch	NYS	880 m	MPC · JPL
816838	2011 UJ_{247}	—	October 21, 2011	Mount Lemmon	Mount Lemmon Survey	·	1.7 km	MPC · JPL
816839	2011 UA_{250}	—	August 20, 2004	Kitt Peak	Spacewatch	·	480 m	MPC · JPL
816840	2011 UM_{254}	—	September 24, 2011	Mount Lemmon	Mount Lemmon Survey	MAS	580 m	MPC · JPL
816841	2011 UP_{256}	—	October 29, 2006	Kitt Peak	Spacewatch	·	1.7 km	MPC · JPL
816842	2011 UV_{256}	—	October 5, 2003	Kitt Peak	Spacewatch	T_{j} (2.94)	3.7 km	MPC · JPL
816843	2011 UX_{261}	—	December 13, 2006	Kitt Peak	Spacewatch	·	1.9 km	MPC · JPL
816844	2011 UX_{262}	—	October 21, 2011	Mount Lemmon	Mount Lemmon Survey	TIN	740 m	MPC · JPL
816845	2011 UT_{267}	—	October 27, 2011	Mount Lemmon	Mount Lemmon Survey	NYS	850 m	MPC · JPL
816846	2011 UL_{268}	—	October 27, 2011	Kitt Peak	Spacewatch	·	1.3 km	MPC · JPL
816847	2011 UO_{273}	—	February 11, 1999	Socorro	LINEAR	·	2.0 km	MPC · JPL
816848	2011 UF_{306}	—	October 23, 2011	Mount Lemmon	Mount Lemmon Survey	NYS	890 m	MPC · JPL
816849	2011 UD_{312}	—	October 22, 2011	Kitt Peak	Spacewatch	·	740 m	MPC · JPL
816850	2011 UW_{314}	—	October 22, 2011	Kitt Peak	Spacewatch	·	860 m	MPC · JPL
816851	2011 UW_{316}	—	October 30, 2011	Kitt Peak	Spacewatch	·	2.3 km	MPC · JPL
816852	2011 UQ_{323}	—	October 18, 2011	Kitt Peak	Spacewatch	·	2.6 km	MPC · JPL
816853	2011 UZ_{331}	—	October 25, 2011	Haleakala	Pan-STARRS 1	·	810 m	MPC · JPL
816854	2011 UJ_{338}	—	September 5, 2002	Sacramento Peak	SDSS	·	1.4 km	MPC · JPL
816855	2011 UQ_{346}	—	September 29, 2011	Kitt Peak	Spacewatch	PHO	620 m	MPC · JPL
816856	2011 UC_{348}	—	October 19, 2011	Mount Lemmon	Mount Lemmon Survey	·	620 m	MPC · JPL
816857	2011 UY_{356}	—	October 20, 2011	Mount Lemmon	Mount Lemmon Survey	·	1.3 km	MPC · JPL
816858	2011 UB_{357}	—	October 20, 2011	Mount Lemmon	Mount Lemmon Survey	·	980 m	MPC · JPL
816859	2011 UO_{363}	—	February 27, 2009	Mount Lemmon	Mount Lemmon Survey	NYS	770 m	MPC · JPL
816860	2011 UU_{365}	—	September 29, 2011	Kitt Peak	Spacewatch	·	1.5 km	MPC · JPL
816861	2011 UY_{368}	—	October 22, 2011	Kitt Peak	Spacewatch	GEF	910 m	MPC · JPL
816862	2011 UA_{373}	—	October 23, 2011	Mount Lemmon	Mount Lemmon Survey	·	1.2 km	MPC · JPL
816863	2011 UY_{374}	—	October 23, 2011	Mount Lemmon	Mount Lemmon Survey	·	1.5 km	MPC · JPL
816864	2011 UD_{375}	—	September 2, 1995	Kitt Peak	Spacewatch	·	1.5 km	MPC · JPL
816865	2011 UP_{378}	—	September 21, 2011	Kitt Peak	Spacewatch	EOS	1.3 km	MPC · JPL
816866	2011 UE_{381}	—	September 30, 2011	Kitt Peak	Spacewatch	·	1.1 km	MPC · JPL
816867	2011 UY_{383}	—	October 24, 2011	Haleakala	Pan-STARRS 1	·	1.7 km	MPC · JPL
816868	2011 UR_{385}	—	October 25, 2011	Haleakala	Pan-STARRS 1	·	770 m	MPC · JPL
816869	2011 UH_{390}	—	October 26, 2011	Haleakala	Pan-STARRS 1	(2076)	740 m	MPC · JPL
816870	2011 UF_{392}	—	October 27, 2011	Mount Lemmon	Mount Lemmon Survey	·	840 m	MPC · JPL
816871	2011 UR_{397}	—	October 30, 2011	Mayhill-ISON	L. Elenin	·	1.7 km	MPC · JPL
816872	2011 UL_{402}	—	October 25, 2011	Haleakala	Pan-STARRS 1	H	360 m	MPC · JPL
816873	2011 UO_{405}	—	September 20, 2011	Kitt Peak	Spacewatch	·	720 m	MPC · JPL
816874	2011 UT_{407}	—	October 15, 2004	Kitt Peak	Spacewatch	·	670 m	MPC · JPL
816875	2011 UQ_{408}	—	October 16, 2011	Haleakala	Pan-STARRS 1	·	820 m	MPC · JPL
816876	2011 UR_{413}	—	November 15, 2003	Kitt Peak	Spacewatch	3:2	3.8 km	MPC · JPL
816877	2011 UC_{417}	—	October 25, 2011	Haleakala	Pan-STARRS 1	·	2.4 km	MPC · JPL
816878	2011 UR_{417}	—	October 26, 2011	Haleakala	Pan-STARRS 1	EOS	1.3 km	MPC · JPL
816879	2011 UO_{421}	—	October 18, 2011	Mount Lemmon	Mount Lemmon Survey	NYS	780 m	MPC · JPL
816880	2011 UY_{421}	—	October 26, 2011	Haleakala	Pan-STARRS 1	·	1.9 km	MPC · JPL
816881	2011 UE_{422}	—	October 21, 2011	Mount Lemmon	Mount Lemmon Survey	·	2.3 km	MPC · JPL
816882	2011 UT_{423}	—	February 8, 2013	Haleakala	Pan-STARRS 1	·	1.1 km	MPC · JPL
816883	2011 UH_{424}	—	March 29, 2014	Mount Lemmon	Mount Lemmon Survey	·	1.1 km	MPC · JPL
816884	2011 UK_{426}	—	May 28, 2015	Mount Lemmon	Mount Lemmon Survey	·	2.1 km	MPC · JPL
816885	2011 UK_{428}	—	April 9, 2014	Haleakala	Pan-STARRS 1	·	1.6 km	MPC · JPL
816886	2011 UA_{429}	—	October 26, 2011	Haleakala	Pan-STARRS 1	·	1.3 km	MPC · JPL
816887	2011 UC_{429}	—	October 24, 2011	Haleakala	Pan-STARRS 1	·	1.3 km	MPC · JPL
816888	2011 UZ_{429}	—	October 26, 2011	Haleakala	Pan-STARRS 1	·	1.6 km	MPC · JPL
816889	2011 UL_{430}	—	September 29, 2011	ESA OGS	ESA OGS	·	760 m	MPC · JPL
816890	2011 UE_{434}	—	October 21, 2011	Haleakala	Pan-STARRS 1	EUN	650 m	MPC · JPL
816891	2011 UK_{435}	—	October 25, 2011	Haleakala	Pan-STARRS 1	·	860 m	MPC · JPL
816892	2011 UO_{435}	—	October 25, 2011	Haleakala	Pan-STARRS 1	EUN	830 m	MPC · JPL
816893	2011 UN_{436}	—	November 7, 2015	Haleakala	Pan-STARRS 1	·	640 m	MPC · JPL
816894	2011 UW_{437}	—	October 9, 2007	Mount Lemmon	Mount Lemmon Survey	MAS	580 m	MPC · JPL
816895	2011 UE_{441}	—	June 6, 2016	Mount Lemmon	Mount Lemmon Survey	H	370 m	MPC · JPL
816896	2011 UA_{442}	—	October 20, 2011	Mount Lemmon	Mount Lemmon Survey	·	1.1 km	MPC · JPL
816897	2011 UR_{443}	—	October 25, 2011	Haleakala	Pan-STARRS 1	·	2.4 km	MPC · JPL
816898	2011 UT_{443}	—	October 20, 2011	Kitt Peak	Spacewatch	·	2.1 km	MPC · JPL
816899	2011 UR_{444}	—	October 25, 2011	Haleakala	Pan-STARRS 1	·	1.8 km	MPC · JPL
816900	2011 UB_{445}	—	May 25, 2014	Haleakala	Pan-STARRS 1	·	1.2 km	MPC · JPL

== 816901–817000 ==
back to top

Designation			Discovery			Properties		Ref
Permanent	Provisional	Named after	Date	Site	Discoverer(s)	Category	Diam.	Ref
816901	2011 UX_{446}	—	October 25, 2011	Haleakala	Pan-STARRS 1	H	330 m	MPC · JPL
816902	2011 UJ_{447}	—	October 23, 2011	Mount Lemmon	Mount Lemmon Survey	·	470 m	MPC · JPL
816903	2011 UX_{449}	—	October 26, 2011	Haleakala	Pan-STARRS 1	·	1.3 km	MPC · JPL
816904	2011 UL_{450}	—	October 22, 2011	Mount Lemmon	Mount Lemmon Survey	NYS	720 m	MPC · JPL
816905	2011 UG_{451}	—	October 23, 2011	Mount Lemmon	Mount Lemmon Survey	·	660 m	MPC · JPL
816906	2011 UR_{452}	—	October 26, 2011	Haleakala	Pan-STARRS 1	·	1.4 km	MPC · JPL
816907	2011 UC_{453}	—	October 18, 2011	Mount Lemmon	Mount Lemmon Survey	·	1.1 km	MPC · JPL
816908	2011 UW_{453}	—	October 19, 2011	Mount Lemmon	Mount Lemmon Survey	·	480 m	MPC · JPL
816909	2011 UC_{454}	—	October 20, 2011	Mount Lemmon	Mount Lemmon Survey	·	1.2 km	MPC · JPL
816910	2011 UG_{454}	—	October 21, 2011	Kitt Peak	Spacewatch	·	1.7 km	MPC · JPL
816911	2011 UF_{455}	—	October 20, 2011	Mount Lemmon	Mount Lemmon Survey	·	1.8 km	MPC · JPL
816912	2011 UQ_{455}	—	October 19, 2011	Mount Lemmon	Mount Lemmon Survey	HOF	1.9 km	MPC · JPL
816913	2011 UQ_{456}	—	October 25, 2011	Haleakala	Pan-STARRS 1	·	2.0 km	MPC · JPL
816914	2011 UD_{457}	—	October 31, 2011	Mount Lemmon	Mount Lemmon Survey	·	1.8 km	MPC · JPL
816915	2011 UK_{463}	—	October 24, 2011	Mount Lemmon	Mount Lemmon Survey	·	630 m	MPC · JPL
816916	2011 US_{465}	—	October 20, 2011	Mount Lemmon	Mount Lemmon Survey	·	1.2 km	MPC · JPL
816917	2011 UU_{470}	—	October 20, 2011	Mount Lemmon	Mount Lemmon Survey	·	840 m	MPC · JPL
816918	2011 UR_{472}	—	October 23, 2011	Mount Lemmon	Mount Lemmon Survey	PHO	760 m	MPC · JPL
816919	2011 UQ_{473}	—	October 26, 2011	Haleakala	Pan-STARRS 1	EOS	1.5 km	MPC · JPL
816920	2011 UW_{474}	—	October 21, 2011	Kitt Peak	Spacewatch	EOS	1.5 km	MPC · JPL
816921	2011 UC_{475}	—	October 22, 2011	Mount Lemmon	Mount Lemmon Survey	·	2.0 km	MPC · JPL
816922	2011 UB_{476}	—	October 24, 2011	Haleakala	Pan-STARRS 1	·	1.3 km	MPC · JPL
816923	2011 UK_{480}	—	October 28, 2011	Mount Lemmon	Mount Lemmon Survey	·	1.8 km	MPC · JPL
816924	2011 US_{481}	—	October 27, 2011	Mount Lemmon	Mount Lemmon Survey	·	1.4 km	MPC · JPL
816925	2011 UW_{485}	—	October 25, 2011	Haleakala	Pan-STARRS 1	·	2.5 km	MPC · JPL
816926	2011 UF_{487}	—	October 20, 2011	Mount Lemmon	Mount Lemmon Survey	·	830 m	MPC · JPL
816927	2011 UW_{489}	—	October 24, 2011	Haleakala	Pan-STARRS 1	PHO	700 m	MPC · JPL
816928	2011 UB_{493}	—	October 22, 2011	Mount Lemmon	Mount Lemmon Survey	NYS	840 m	MPC · JPL
816929	2011 UV_{501}	—	October 25, 2011	Haleakala	Pan-STARRS 1	H	390 m	MPC · JPL
816930	2011 UW_{503}	—	October 24, 2011	Haleakala	Pan-STARRS 1	·	800 m	MPC · JPL
816931	2011 VE_{6}	—	September 24, 2011	Haleakala	Pan-STARRS 1	·	1.3 km	MPC · JPL
816932	2011 VZ_{6}	—	October 1, 2011	Cerro Burek	Burek, Cerro	·	2.2 km	MPC · JPL
816933	2011 VB_{7}	—	November 1, 2011	Catalina	CSS	H	390 m	MPC · JPL
816934	2011 VR_{8}	—	November 13, 2011	Haleakala	Pan-STARRS 1	PHO	780 m	MPC · JPL
816935	2011 VZ_{16}	—	October 24, 2011	Haleakala	Pan-STARRS 1	·	1.1 km	MPC · JPL
816936	2011 VT_{17}	—	October 22, 2011	Kitt Peak	Spacewatch	·	850 m	MPC · JPL
816937	2011 VQ_{24}	—	November 2, 2011	Mount Lemmon	Mount Lemmon Survey	·	2.2 km	MPC · JPL
816938	2011 VL_{26}	—	March 2, 2013	Mount Lemmon	Mount Lemmon Survey	V	470 m	MPC · JPL
816939	2011 VE_{27}	—	November 2, 2011	Kitt Peak	Spacewatch	·	1.7 km	MPC · JPL
816940	2011 VQ_{27}	—	November 3, 2011	Catalina	CSS	PHO	670 m	MPC · JPL
816941	2011 VW_{27}	—	May 28, 2014	Haleakala	Pan-STARRS 1	·	760 m	MPC · JPL
816942	2011 VX_{27}	—	May 30, 2014	Haleakala	Pan-STARRS 1	PHO	860 m	MPC · JPL
816943	2011 VY_{27}	—	November 2, 2011	Kitt Peak	Spacewatch	·	830 m	MPC · JPL
816944	2011 VC_{28}	—	November 15, 2011	Mount Lemmon	Mount Lemmon Survey	NYS	670 m	MPC · JPL
816945	2011 VG_{28}	—	November 4, 2011	Zelenchukskaya	T. V. Krjačko, B. Satovski	H	340 m	MPC · JPL
816946	2011 VN_{31}	—	November 2, 2011	Mount Lemmon	Mount Lemmon Survey	·	1.5 km	MPC · JPL
816947	2011 VB_{32}	—	November 2, 2011	Kitt Peak	Spacewatch	·	1.5 km	MPC · JPL
816948	2011 VE_{32}	—	November 3, 2011	Kitt Peak	Spacewatch	·	1.4 km	MPC · JPL
816949	2011 VP_{33}	—	November 3, 2011	Kitt Peak	Spacewatch	·	920 m	MPC · JPL
816950	2011 VJ_{34}	—	November 1, 2011	Kitt Peak	Spacewatch	EOS	1.4 km	MPC · JPL
816951	2011 WN_{6}	—	September 14, 2002	Palomar Mountain	NEAT	·	980 m	MPC · JPL
816952	2011 WJ_{7}	—	October 24, 2011	Haleakala	Pan-STARRS 1	EOS	1.4 km	MPC · JPL
816953	2011 WP_{7}	—	November 16, 2011	Mount Lemmon	Mount Lemmon Survey	·	2.0 km	MPC · JPL
816954	2011 WQ_{7}	—	October 30, 2011	Kitt Peak	Spacewatch	·	1.8 km	MPC · JPL
816955	2011 WY_{14}	—	October 26, 2011	Haleakala	Pan-STARRS 1	·	840 m	MPC · JPL
816956	2011 WA_{19}	—	October 26, 2011	Haleakala	Pan-STARRS 1	KOR	1.2 km	MPC · JPL
816957	2011 WB_{19}	—	November 17, 2011	Kitt Peak	Spacewatch	PHO	780 m	MPC · JPL
816958	2011 WM_{20}	—	November 17, 2011	Mount Lemmon	Mount Lemmon Survey	·	1.5 km	MPC · JPL
816959	2011 WY_{21}	—	November 17, 2011	Mount Lemmon	Mount Lemmon Survey	·	770 m	MPC · JPL
816960	2011 WY_{31}	—	November 23, 2011	Piszkés-tető	K. Sárneczky, A. Pál	EOS	1.2 km	MPC · JPL
816961	2011 WB_{36}	—	October 22, 2011	Kitt Peak	Spacewatch	·	670 m	MPC · JPL
816962	2011 WK_{36}	—	November 2, 2011	Kitt Peak	Spacewatch	GEF	920 m	MPC · JPL
816963	2011 WZ_{46}	—	November 22, 2011	Bergisch Gladbach	W. Bickel	H	330 m	MPC · JPL
816964	2011 WJ_{50}	—	October 25, 2011	Haleakala	Pan-STARRS 1	H	410 m	MPC · JPL
816965	2011 WE_{59}	—	October 26, 2011	Haleakala	Pan-STARRS 1	NYS	770 m	MPC · JPL
816966	2011 WT_{61}	—	October 26, 2011	Haleakala	Pan-STARRS 1	·	670 m	MPC · JPL
816967	2011 WR_{67}	—	October 26, 2011	Haleakala	Pan-STARRS 1	·	2.1 km	MPC · JPL
816968	2011 WO_{74}	—	November 16, 2011	Mount Lemmon	Mount Lemmon Survey	H	410 m	MPC · JPL
816969	2011 WS_{80}	—	October 26, 2011	Haleakala	Pan-STARRS 1	MRX	840 m	MPC · JPL
816970	2011 WZ_{80}	—	October 26, 2011	Haleakala	Pan-STARRS 1	WIT	730 m	MPC · JPL
816971	2011 WC_{93}	—	April 12, 2010	Mount Lemmon	Mount Lemmon Survey	H	390 m	MPC · JPL
816972	2011 WH_{93}	—	November 27, 2011	Mount Lemmon	Mount Lemmon Survey	·	820 m	MPC · JPL
816973	2011 WJ_{96}	—	November 30, 2011	Haleakala	Pan-STARRS 1	H	470 m	MPC · JPL
816974	2011 WR_{100}	—	October 19, 2003	Sacramento Peak	SDSS	3:2	4.4 km	MPC · JPL
816975	2011 WH_{107}	—	October 26, 2011	Haleakala	Pan-STARRS 1	·	770 m	MPC · JPL
816976	2011 WR_{107}	—	January 18, 2009	Kitt Peak	Spacewatch	·	450 m	MPC · JPL
816977	2011 WD_{111}	—	November 30, 2011	Haleakala	Pan-STARRS 1	H	350 m	MPC · JPL
816978	2011 WZ_{116}	—	November 1, 2011	Kitt Peak	Spacewatch	H	390 m	MPC · JPL
816979	2011 WZ_{125}	—	November 22, 2011	Mount Lemmon	Mount Lemmon Survey	·	890 m	MPC · JPL
816980	2011 WP_{129}	—	November 16, 2011	Mount Lemmon	Mount Lemmon Survey	·	860 m	MPC · JPL
816981	2011 WV_{131}	—	October 26, 2011	Haleakala	Pan-STARRS 1	(5)	760 m	MPC · JPL
816982	2011 WY_{131}	—	August 9, 2007	Kitt Peak	Spacewatch	·	810 m	MPC · JPL
816983	2011 WX_{134}	—	August 25, 2003	Cerro Tololo	Deep Ecliptic Survey	H	450 m	MPC · JPL
816984	2011 WT_{140}	—	November 18, 2011	Mount Lemmon	Mount Lemmon Survey	(5)	960 m	MPC · JPL
816985	2011 WY_{147}	—	October 26, 2011	Haleakala	Pan-STARRS 1	·	2.5 km	MPC · JPL
816986	2011 WZ_{148}	—	July 3, 2005	Palomar	NEAT	H	550 m	MPC · JPL
816987	2011 WA_{151}	—	November 28, 2011	Palomar	Palomar Transient Factory	PHO	950 m	MPC · JPL
816988	2011 WF_{160}	—	November 17, 2011	Mount Lemmon	Mount Lemmon Survey	·	1.1 km	MPC · JPL
816989	2011 WG_{163}	—	May 31, 2013	Haleakala	Pan-STARRS 1	H	440 m	MPC · JPL
816990	2011 WX_{163}	—	October 19, 2016	Mount Lemmon	Mount Lemmon Survey	·	2.0 km	MPC · JPL
816991	2011 WH_{166}	—	June 2, 2014	Haleakala	Pan-STARRS 1	MAR	640 m	MPC · JPL
816992	2011 WV_{166}	—	January 26, 2017	Mount Lemmon	Mount Lemmon Survey	·	1.4 km	MPC · JPL
816993	2011 WW_{166}	—	November 26, 2011	Mount Lemmon	Mount Lemmon Survey	·	610 m	MPC · JPL
816994	2011 WS_{168}	—	November 24, 2011	Mount Lemmon	Mount Lemmon Survey	·	1.2 km	MPC · JPL
816995	2011 WM_{170}	—	October 13, 2015	Haleakala	Pan-STARRS 1	·	1.1 km	MPC · JPL
816996	2011 WW_{170}	—	May 8, 2014	Haleakala	Pan-STARRS 1	EOS	1.2 km	MPC · JPL
816997	2011 WN_{173}	—	May 10, 2014	Haleakala	Pan-STARRS 1	·	760 m	MPC · JPL
816998	2011 WQ_{173}	—	September 22, 2014	Haleakala	Pan-STARRS 1	V	460 m	MPC · JPL
816999	2011 WC_{174}	—	November 24, 2011	Haleakala	Pan-STARRS 1	H	430 m	MPC · JPL
817000	2011 WC_{177}	—	November 30, 2011	Mount Lemmon	Mount Lemmon Survey	·	1.4 km	MPC · JPL

back to top
